= Uniforms of the Canadian Armed Forces =

Canadian military's official dress

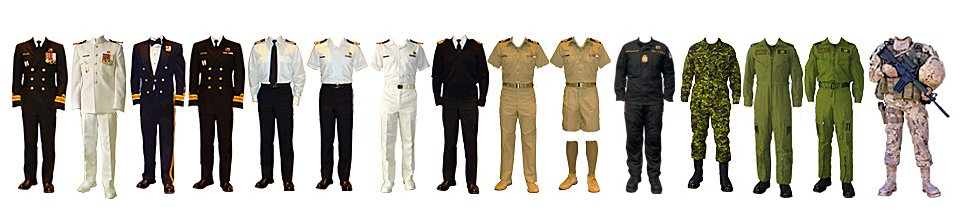
Ceremonial and operational uniforms used by the Royal Canadian Navy (RCN). The operational dress is also used by other services of the Canadian Armed Forces, with its personnel wearing uniforms that are most appropriate for the working environment.

The uniforms of the Canadian Armed Forces are the official dress worn by members of Canada's military while on duty.

Prior to the unification of the Canadian Armed Forces, the uniforms of the Canadian Army, Royal Canadian Air Force (RCAF) and Royal Canadian Navy (RCN) were similar to their counterparts in the forces of the United Kingdom and other Commonwealth countries, save for national identifiers and some regimental accoutrements. With the unification of the Canadian Forces in 1968, all service branches began to wear Canadian Forces rifle green uniforms. Distinctive Environmental Uniforms (DEUs) for the various branches of the Canadian Forces was introduced in the late 1980s, and are generally similar to their pre-unification uniforms.

== Numbered Orders of Dress ==
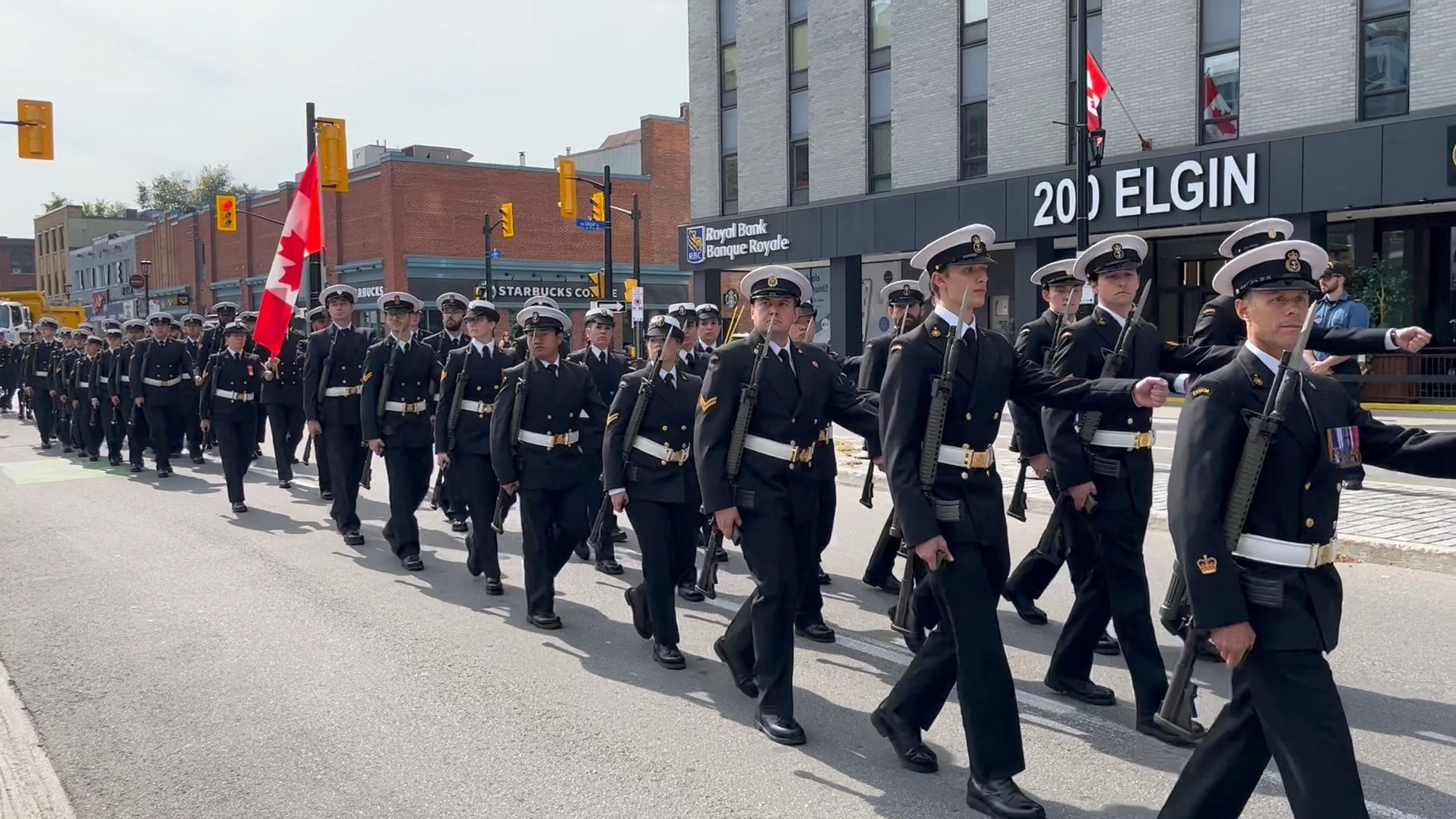
Ship's company of HMCS Carleton parading in No. 1 Dress exercising their Freedom of the City of Ottawa.

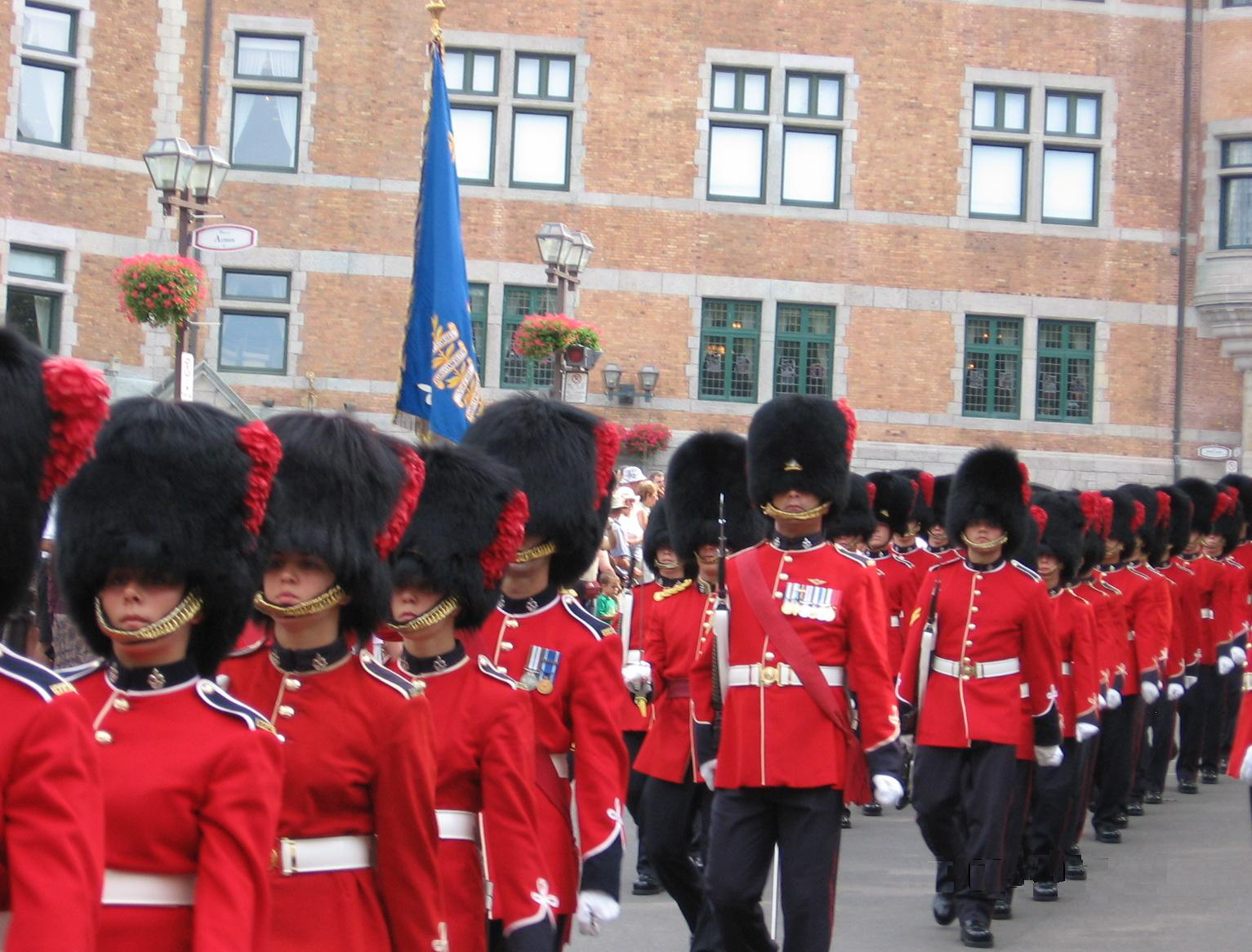
Members of the Royal 22^{e} Régiment in No. 1B (Full Dress) uniform during the 400th anniversary of Quebec City.

=== No. 1 (Ceremonial) Dress ===
Full formal dress uniforms for ceremonial parades and other special occasions.

- No. 1 (Accoutrements): Service Dress (see below) uniform with medals and ceremonial accoutrements (swords, white web belts, gloves, etc.).
- No. 1A (Medals Only): Service Dress uniform with medals, but no ceremonial accoutrements.
- No. 1B (Full Dress): Regimental full dress (such as scarlet tunics and bearskin hats of Guards regiments). Regimental uniforms are normally not provided at public expense; purchase of these uniforms is done either by individuals or by various regiments out of non-public funds.
- No. 1C (Semi-Ceremonial): Patrol dress (a slightly less elaborate regimental uniform) or the Navy high-collared white jacket.
- No. 1D (Undress Ribbons): No. 1C worn with ribbons instead of medals.

=== No. 2 (Mess) Dress ===
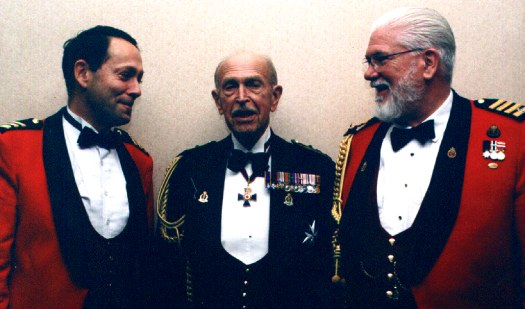
Three officers in shawl collared mess jacket and waistcoated mess dress. Miniature medals and other accoutrements are also worn.

Formal evening attire for mess dinners. Mess dress is not provided at public expense; however, all commissioned officers of the Regular Force are required to own mess dress within six months of being commissioned.

- No. 2 (Mess Standard): Full mess kit with mess jackets, cummerbunds or waistcoats, etc.
- No. 2A (Mess White): No. 2 with summer white jacket.
- No. 2B (Mess Service): No. 3 with white dress shirt and bow tie; worn by CF members who do not own No. 2 mess dress.
- No. 2C (Mess Shipboard): No. 3B with a cummerbund and without ribbons or name tag; worn as evening wear on board ship. Sometimes called Red Sea rig.
- No. 2D (CAF Mess Standard): Air Force members are permitted to continue wearing the unified CAF pattern of mess dress.

=== No. 3 (Service) Dress ===
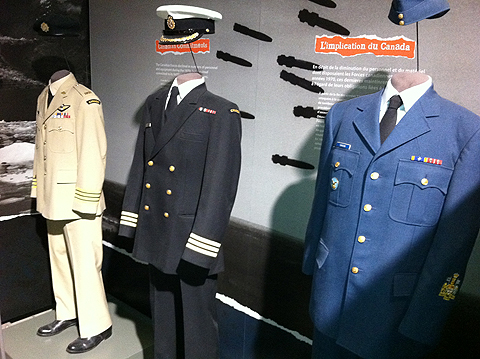
Historical service dress for the Canadian Army (left), Royal Canadian Navy (centre), and the Royal Canadian Air Force (right) on display.

Also called a "walking-out" or "duty uniform", it is the military equivalent of the business suit; it is the standard uniform for appearing in public (hence the moniker "walking-out dress"). No 3 Service Dress becomes No 2B Mess Dress by replacing the shirt and tie with a white shirt and bow tie, or to No 1 Ceremonial Dress by the addition of ceremonial web or sword belts, gloves, and other accoutrements.

- No. 3 (Duty Service): Tunic and necktie, with medal ribbons.
- No. 3A (Long-Sleeved Shirt): No. 3 with jacket removed; worn only indoors, within DND buildings.
- No. 3B (Short-Sleeved Shirt): Short-sleeved shirt, without tunic or tie; worn during the summer on less formal occasions.
- No. 3C (Sweater): Worn over the short-sleeved or long-sleeved shirt. For Army and RCAF, the collar may be open on the shirts, or the tie may be worn with the long-sleeve shirt; however, RCN officers will wear the long-sleeve shirt with tie when wearing the sweater.

=== No. 4 (Base) Dress ===
"Work dress", as it was commonly known, was a more informal uniform, originally for day-to-day wear in garrison or on base, out of the public eye. It usually consisted of work trousers and either a dress shirt or work shirt, with an optional sweater; Army personnel wore a disruptive-pattern jacket.

The Canadian Army later replaced work dress with "No. 4 (Garrison) Dress", which consisted of the old-style work dress pants, a disruptive-pattern jacket, a black web belt, a short-sleeve summer Service Dress shirt with the collar open and over the jacket collar, and high paratrooper-style garrison boots. The rifle-green crew-neck combat sweater doubled as a sweater for wear with Service Dress and Garrison Dress. Due to concerns over the number of uniforms Army personnel had to carry with them on postings and taskings, the tan summer DEU was eventually retired, and the winter uniform was mandated for year-round wear. The garrison dress uniform was not popular with the combat arms, as the boots were easily scuffed, especially when doing manual labour; the jacket was heavily lined and restrictive; the belt was designed to ride very high on the body and served no practical purpose. Army troops generally eschewed garrison dress for the combat uniform when possible, even in garrison. Land Force Western Area actually instructed its units to wear the combat uniform instead, and Land Force Command later adopted the practice across the rest of the country, authorizing combat uniform for all occasions where garrison dress was deemed appropriate.

Work dress and the Army garrison dress have been phased out; No. 5 dress (for the army) and No. 3 (for the air force and navy) were adapted to replace them.

=== No. 5 (Operational) Dress ===
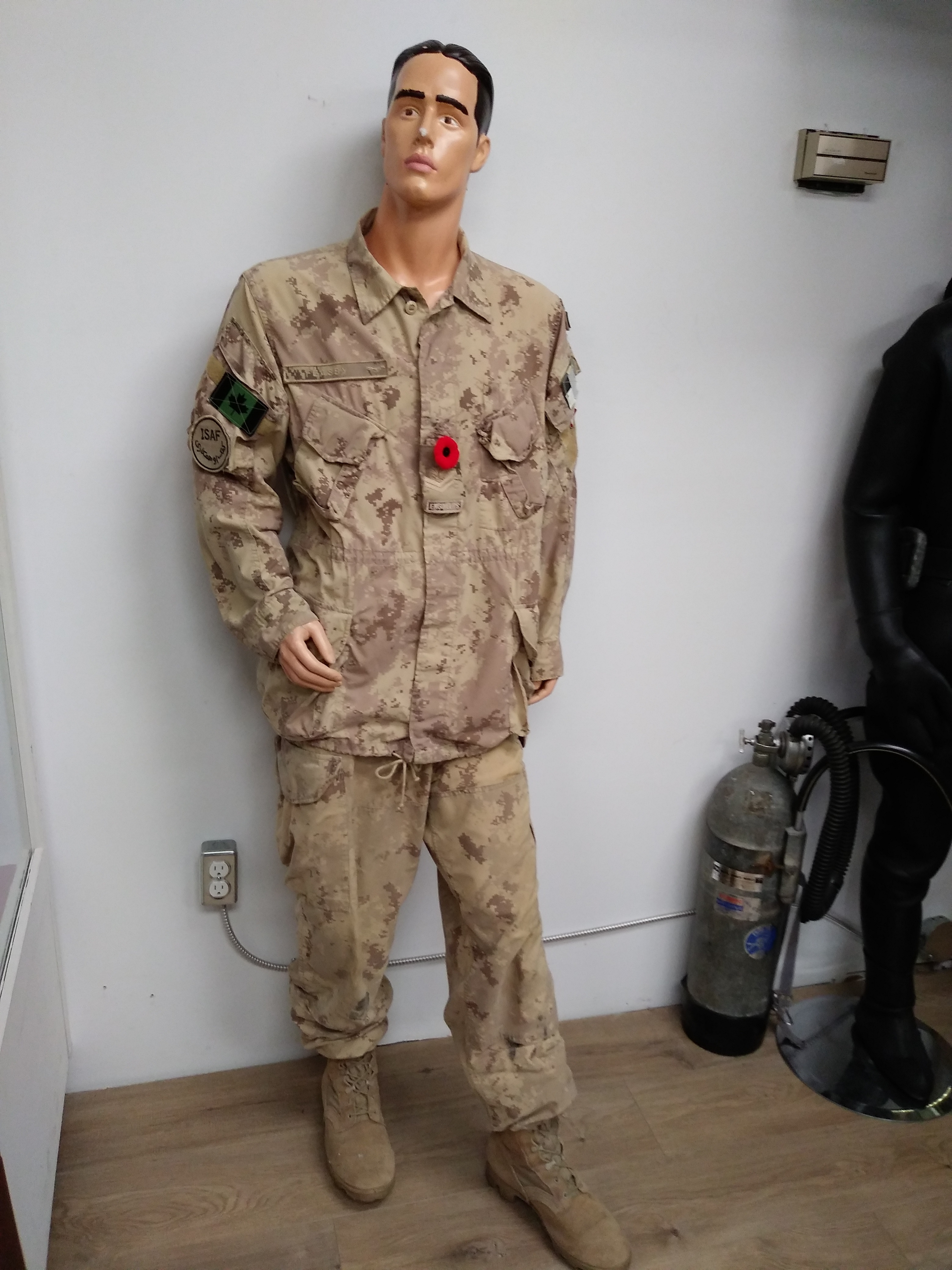
A mannequin dressed in CADPAT AR operational dress.

Operational dress uniforms are designed for wear in combat conditions. They are intended to be adjusted for comfort and practicality; therefore, only naval combat dress had lettered variants. With the elimination of work/garrison dress, operational dress uniforms are now worn whenever service dress is impractical.

- Naval Combat Dress (NCD): Worn by all RCN shipboard personnel until 2021, when the RCN began to roll out the all-black Naval Enhanced Combat Uniform (NECU), a roll out they expected to complete by 2024. The NCD consisted of black trousers and jacket with a blue shirt made of Nomex for fire protection and designed for wear by ships' crews.
  - No. 5: full NCD, including jacket
  - No. 5A: No. 5 without jacket
  - No. 5B: No. 5A with sleeves rolled
  - No. 5D (tropical shipboard): Obsolete, even though it is still in the dress instructions. No. 5B with shorts and knee socks in place of regular trousers. Worn only aboard ship in hot climates.
- Naval Enhanced Combat Uniform (NECU): First issued in winter 2021, this new uniform does not have orders of dress like the NCD. The NECU is more akin to the Army operational clothing. It consists of black pants with zippered cargo pockets and a zippered black shirt worn over a black t-shirt.
- Field combat clothing (Operational Dress): Worn by all army and air force personnel, as well as navy personnel assigned to army or air force units. The CAF combat uniform consists of loose-fitting Canadian Disruptive Pattern (CADPAT) shirt and trousers and is designed to be worn in the field or for working around aircraft. This uniform is usually referred to simply as CADPAT. Navy, army and air force are distinguished by the colour of T-shirt and embroidery of name tapes and rank insignia: black for navy, green or tan for army, and blue for air force.
- Flying clothing: Green flying suits are worn by RCAF aircrew.

== Distinctive Environmental Uniforms ==
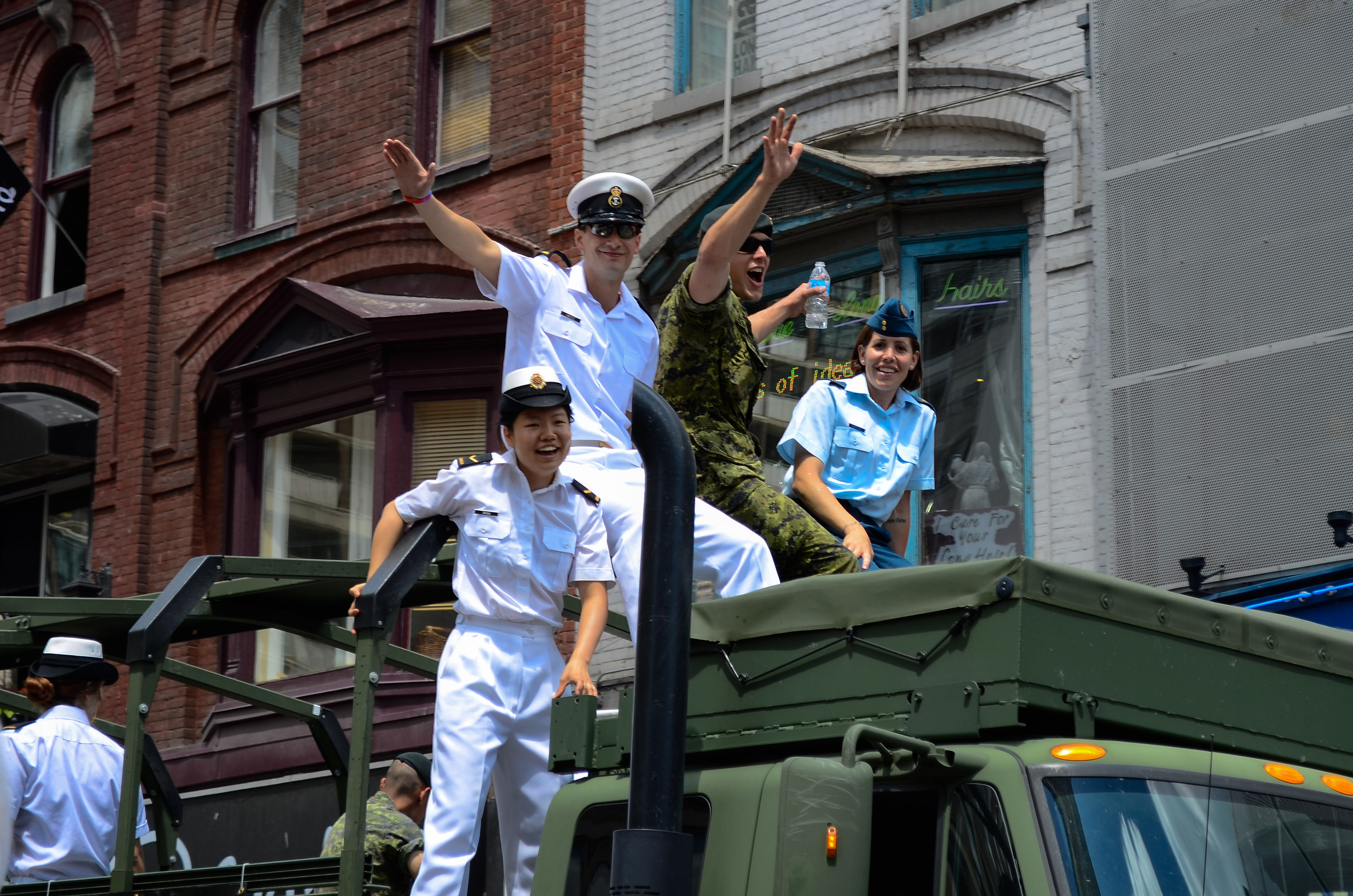
Canadian Armed Forces personnel dressed in their distinctive environmental uniforms.

Although the Canadian Armed Forces are a single service, the respective environmental commands are issued Distinctive Environmental Uniforms (DEU) unique to each command. Commands with their own DEUs include the Canadian Army, Royal Canadian Air Force, Royal Canadian Navy, and Canadian Special Operations Forces Command. While DEU refers to all the different environmental uniforms used by the forces, in colloquial usage it refers to what is formally known as "No. 3 (Service) Dress".

=== History ===
Shortly after the armed services of Canada were unified into the Canadian Armed Forces, the service-specific uniforms (navy blue, khaki, and light blue) were abandoned in favour of the Canadian Forces rifle green, single-breasted, four-button tunic and pants, with beret or service cap uniform, commonly referred to as "CFs" or "CF greens". Though accommodation was made for army regiments' ceremonial dress uniforms, no allowance was made for the Navy or Air Force, with the exception of a rifle-green wedge cap for optional wear by the latter. The traditional Navy and Air Force rank names were replaced by the army equivalents, with naval-style rank badges for officers and army-style for non-commissioned members. Navy rank names were restored a few years later. However, the Air Force retains what had formerly been considered "army" rank (but which is similar to that used by the air forces of many other nations).

For everyday work wear, in environments or occasions where the CF greens would not be appropriate, personnel were issued the Work Dress uniform. This consisted of rifle-green work trousers; a zippered rifle-green work jacket; a "lagoon green" work shirt; and beret. The jacket collar was worn open; the shirt was either worn with a tie, or with the collar open and over the jacket collar. For a brief period in the 1980s, ascots or dickeys in regimental or branch colours were worn inside the open shirt collar. Army field units normally wore combat boots with work dress, "blousing" the trousers with elastic boot bands. Many Army regiments wore regimental shoulder flashes on the work dress jacket.

A notable exception was the Special Service Force (SSF), who wore a camouflage jump smock, regimental T-shirt, beret, and high-top paratrooper boots, with work dress or combat trousers as applicable.

DEU were issued to the CF beginning in 1986. Members of the sea, land and air forces were issued uniforms distinctive to their service or "environment". Officers' and non-commissioned members' uniforms are identical, differing only in insignia and accoutrements. In 2017 a fourth pattern of DEU was created for the Special Operations Forces Branch.

== Ceremonial dress ==
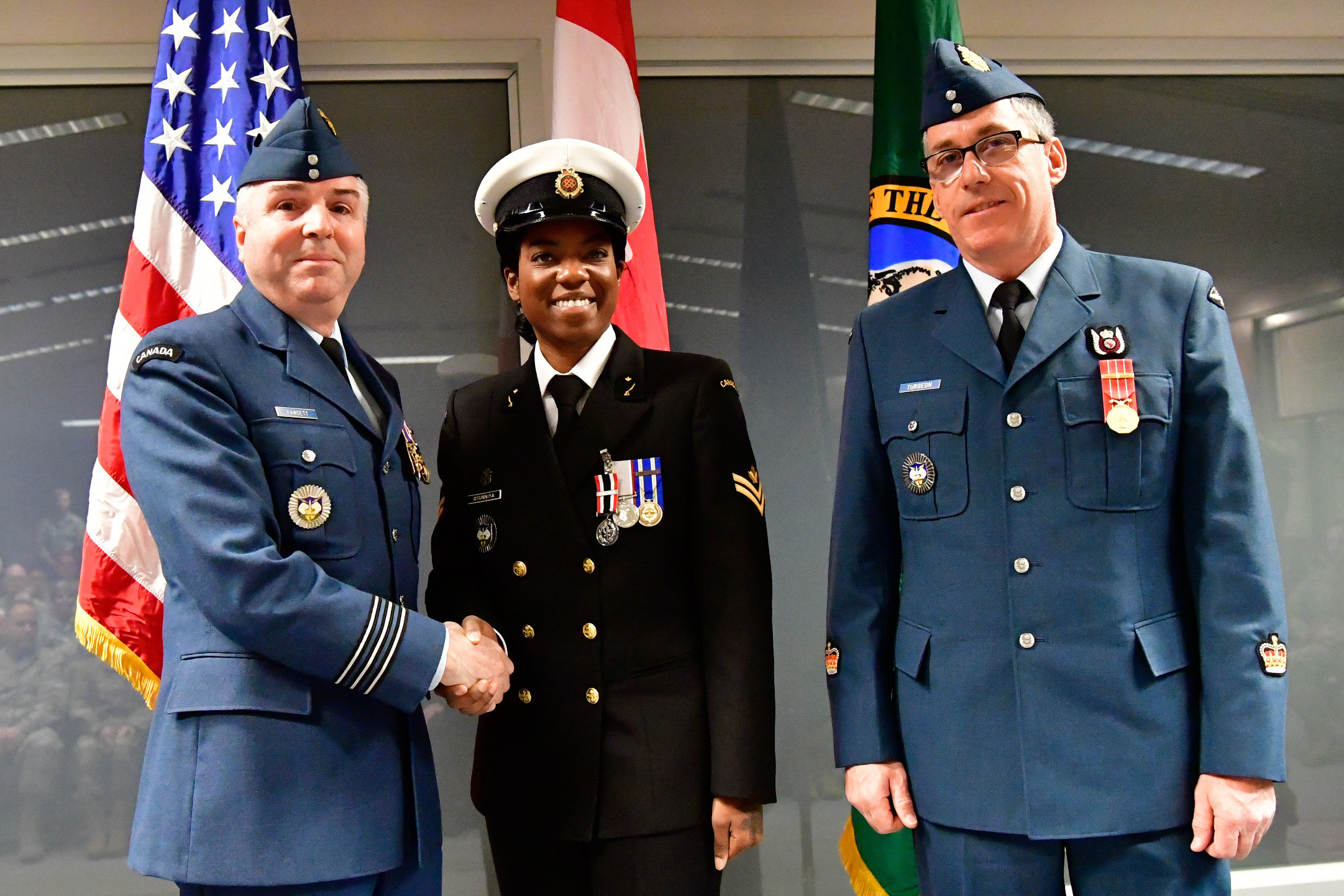
Members of the RCAF and the RCN in No. 1A Dress

Ceremonial dress uniforms include elaborate traditional full dress or undress uniforms, that may be purchased by individuals or their units. Full dress uniforms (No. 1B ceremonial dress) are worn by the Canadian Army, RCAF pipe bands, and cadets of the Royal Military College of Canada. Undress (or patrol dress) uniforms (No. 1C ceremonial dress) are worn by the Royal Military College of Canada, reserve force combat arms regiments, Navy personnel and Air Force pipe bands.

Although the distinctive elemental service dress uniforms are primarily used as duty uniforms, the uniform is also used as a ceremonial dress uniform when worn with ceremonial accoutrements and medals (No. 1 ceremonial dress). The uniform without accoutrements is referred to as No. 1A ceremonial dress. The uniforms may be worn for ceremonial occasions by all units which do not have full dress, or when full dress is not appropriate.

=== Canadian Army ===
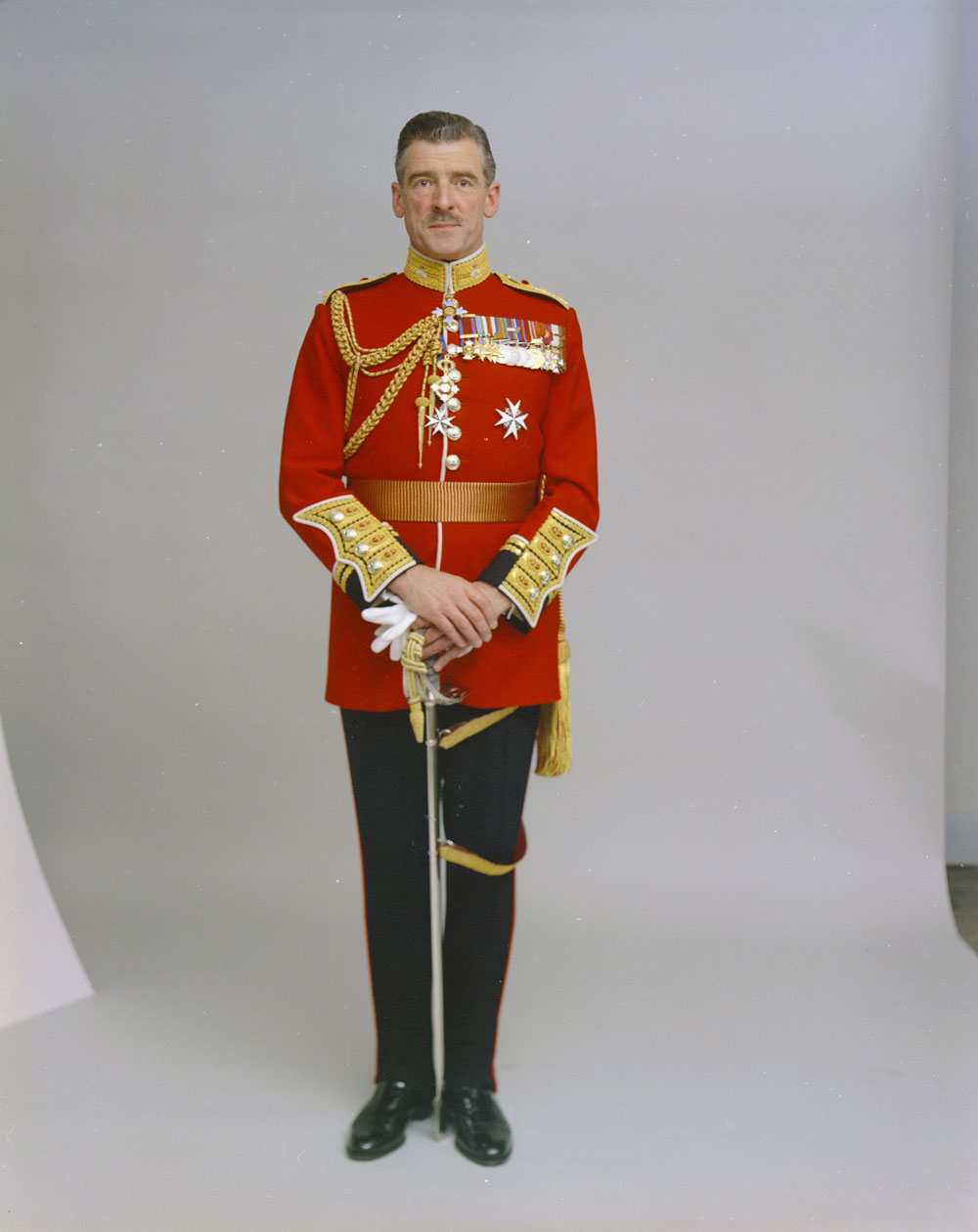
Major General Desmond Smith in a full dress scarlet tunic.

The Canadian Army's universal full dress uniforms includes a scarlet tunic, midnight blue trousers with a 0.6 centimetres (0.24 in) scarlet trouser stripe. The scarlet tunic includes white pipings, and the unit's facing colours on the tunic's collar, and shoulder strap. The tunic's sleeve also has a trefoil-shaped Austrian knot embroidered on the exterior cuff. The authorized headgear for the universal full dress uniform is a white Wolseley helmet. A white ceremonial belt is also authorized for ceremonial wear.

Although the Canadian Army maintains a universal design for its ceremonial dress, many regiments in the Canadian Army are authorized regimental differences from the universal full dress pattern, including some armoured units, Scottish regiments, and all artillery, and Voltigeur/rifle regiments. Authorized regimental differences for headgear include a bearskin cap for foot guards and fusiliers, a busby for rifles/Voltigeurs (excluding Les Voltigeurs de Québec, which uses a shako), a feather bonnet for Scottish regiments, and several different authorized headgears for armoured regiments. A number of regiments are also authorized to wear different brass buckles on their belts, bearing the badge of their respective regiments.

Most of the Canadian Army's ceremonial embellishments emerged from a simplified system ordered by the Monarch of Canada in 1902, and later promulgated in the Canadian Militia Dress Regulations 1907, and Militia Order No. 58/1908 for non-commissioned officer.

Full dress uniforms in the Canadian Army (Regular and Reserve Force)

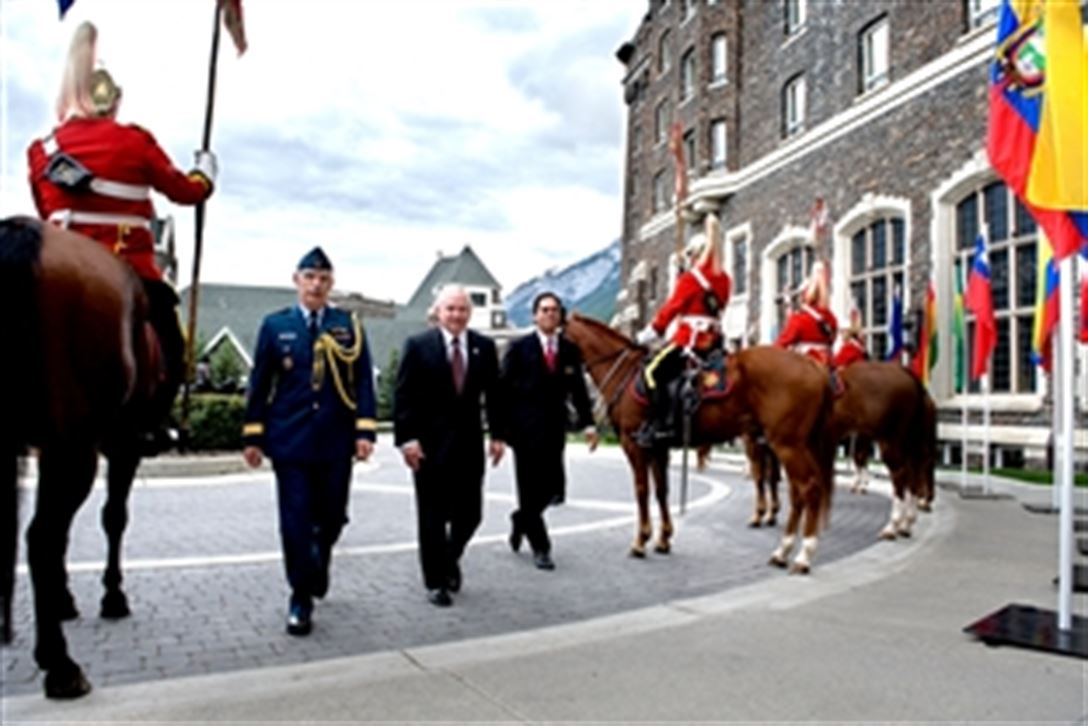
Lord Strathcona's Horse are authorized to wear brass helmets with red and white plumes

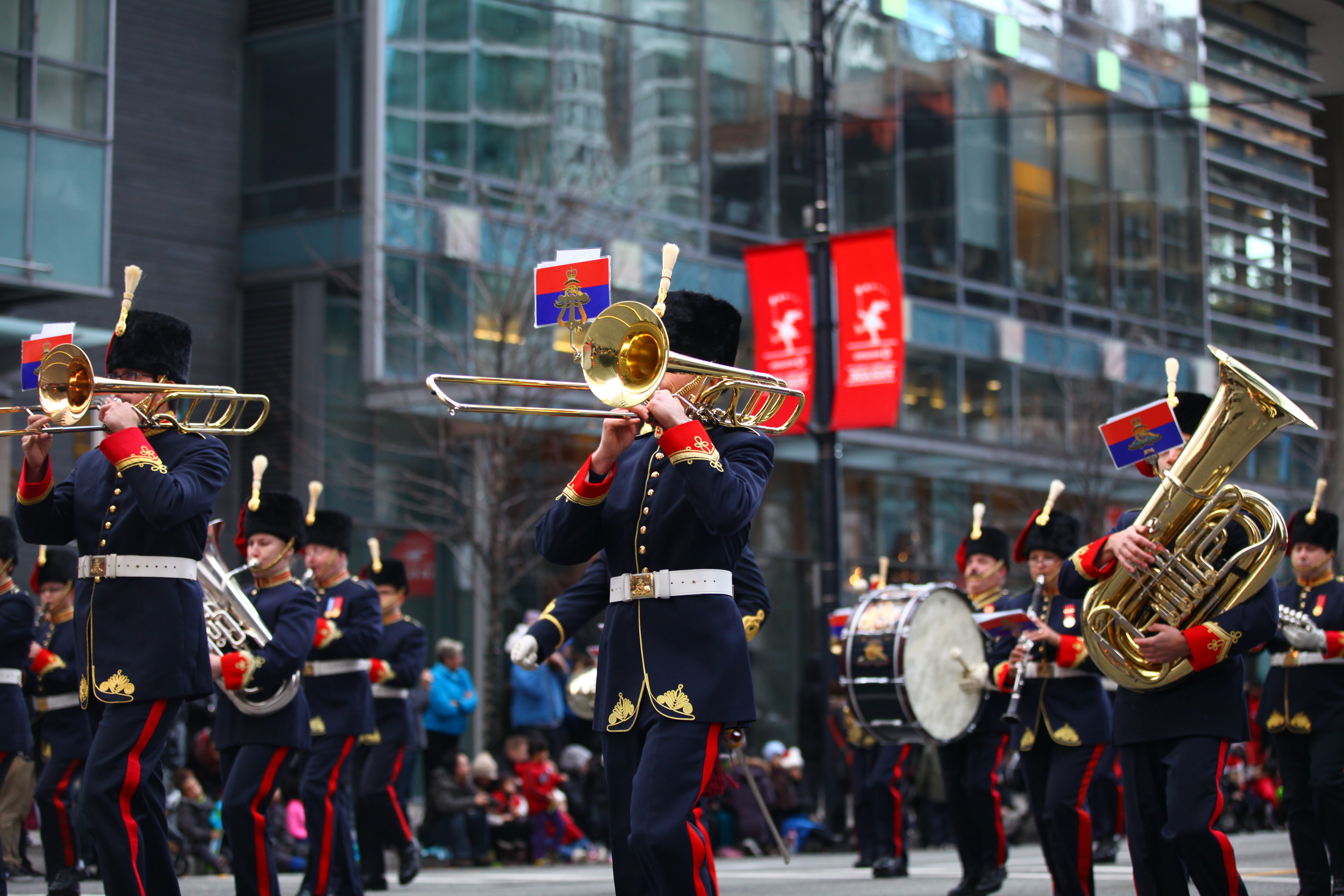
The Royal Regiment of Canadian Artillery full dress tunic is blue with scarlet facings

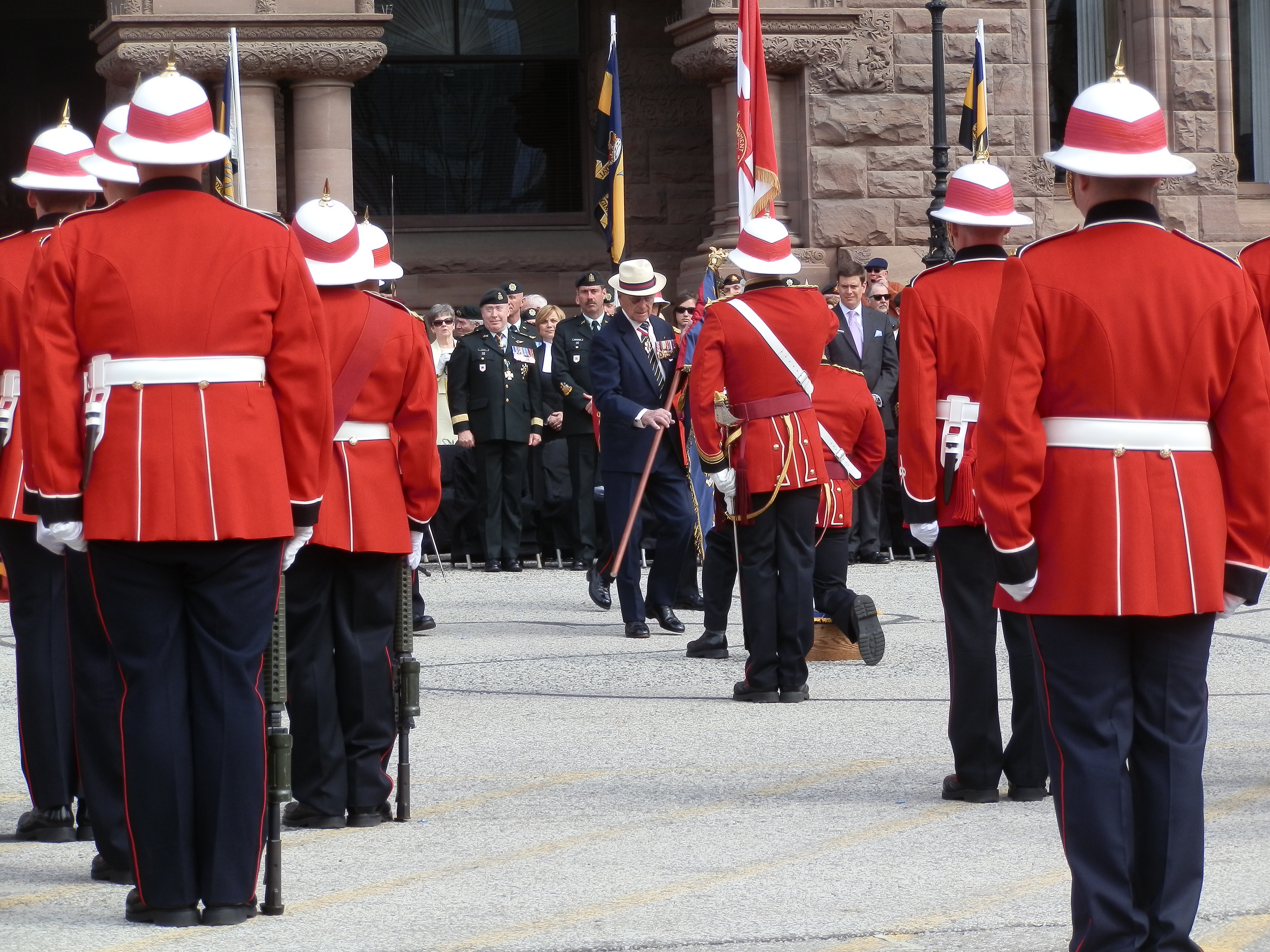
The Royal Canadian Regiment's full dress tunic is scarlet with white pipings on its back.

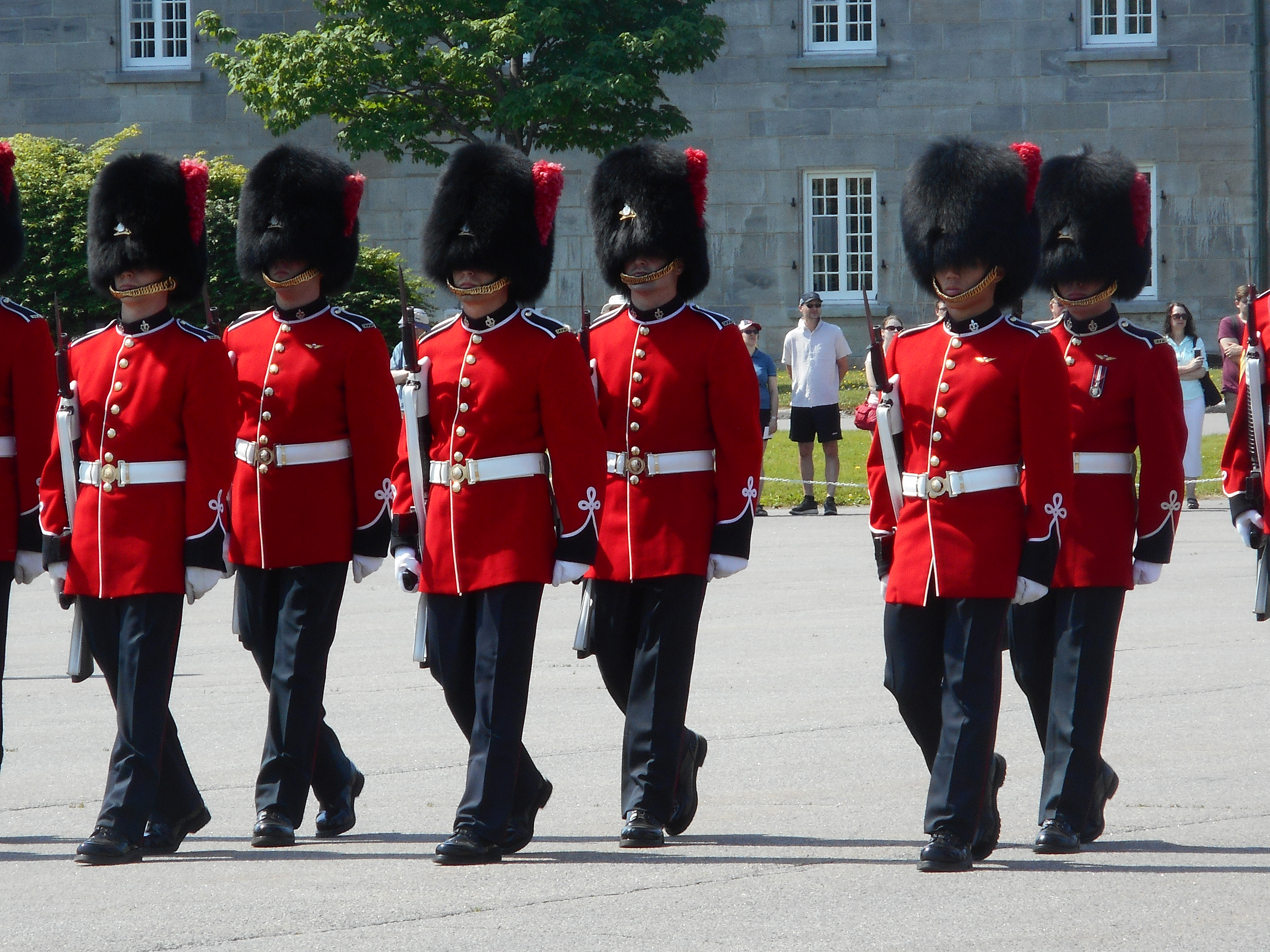
The Royal 22^{e} Régiment's full dress headgear is a bearskin cap with a scarlet plume.

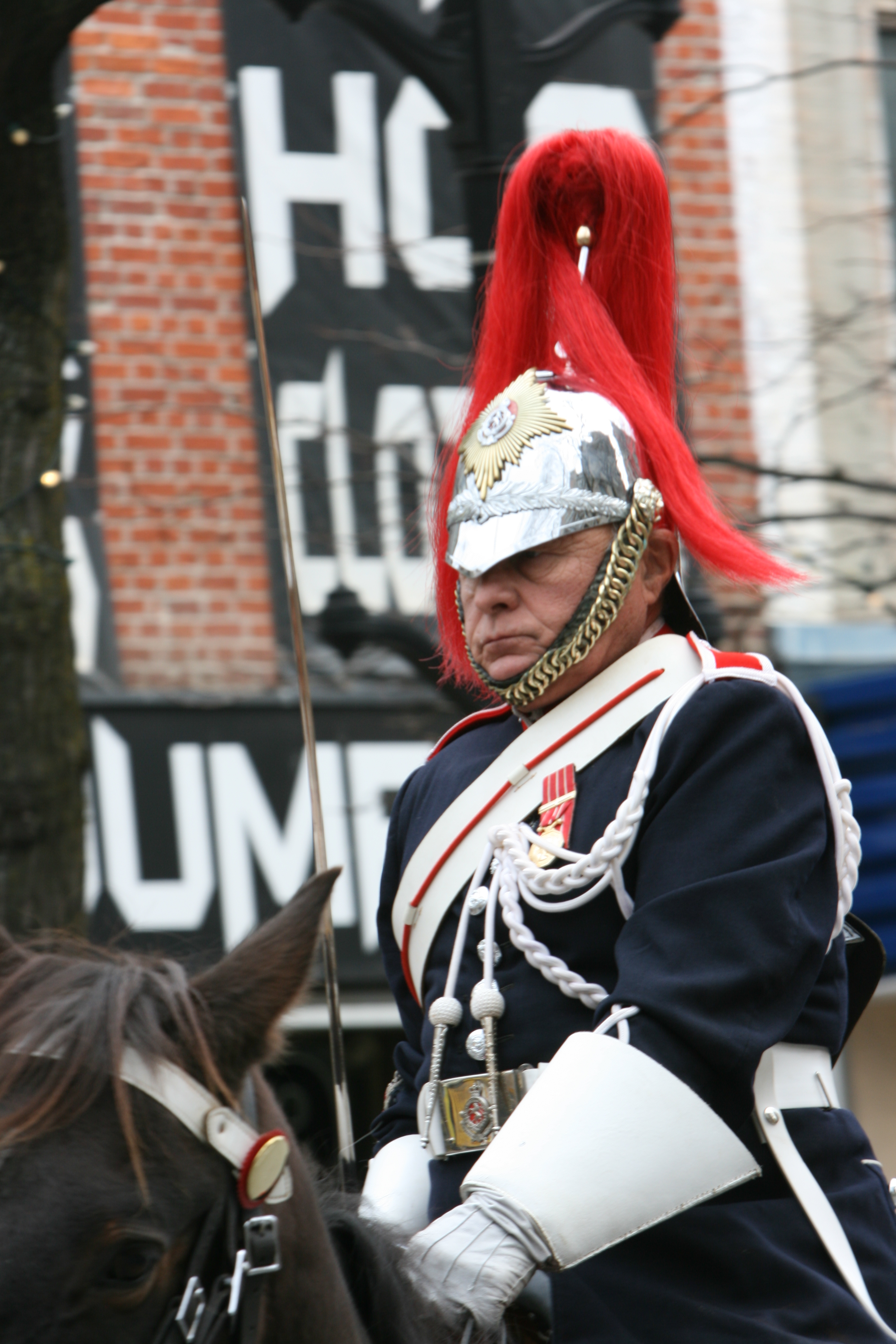
The Governor General's Horse Guards' full dress headgear is a metal helmet with a scarlet plume.

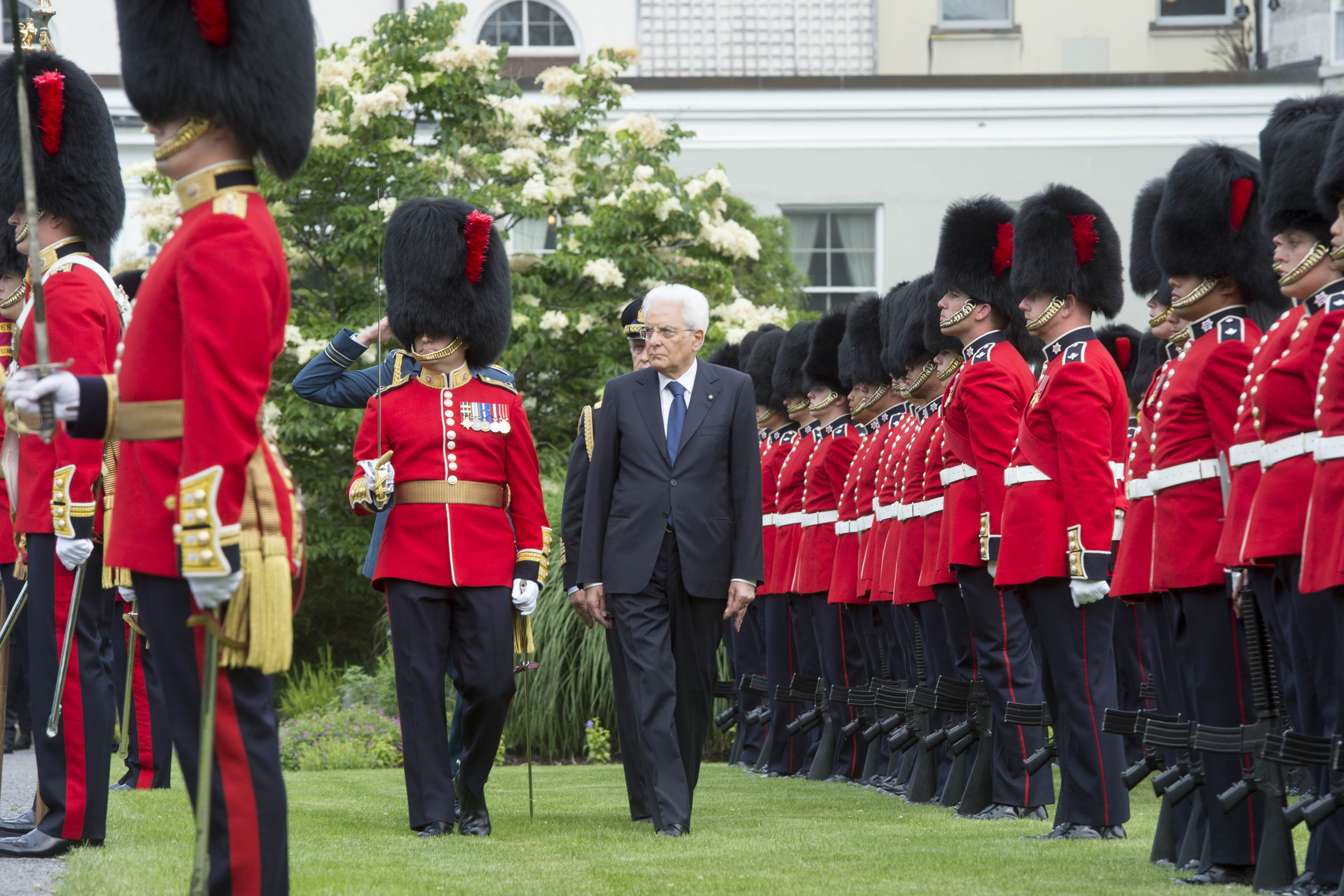
The Governor General's Foot Guards' full dress trousers are midnight blue with a scarlet stripe.

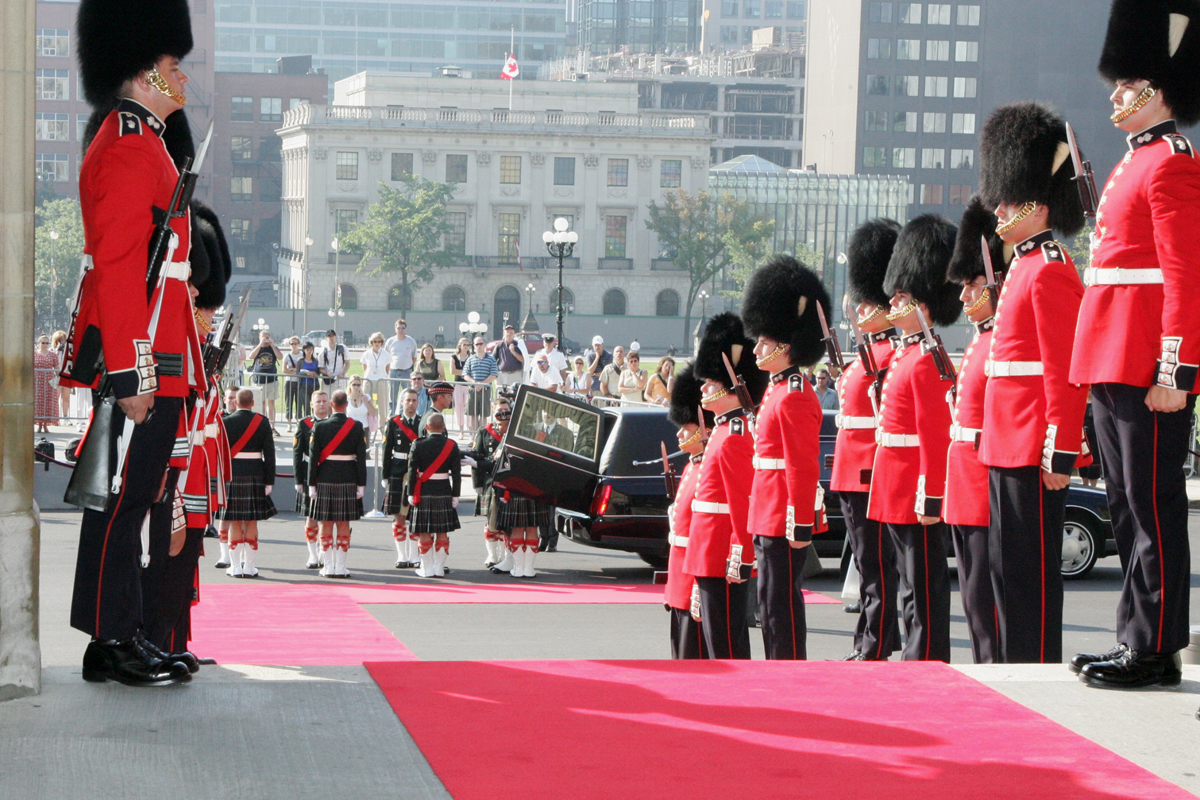
The Canadian Grenadier Guards' full dress headgear is a bearskin cap with a white plume.

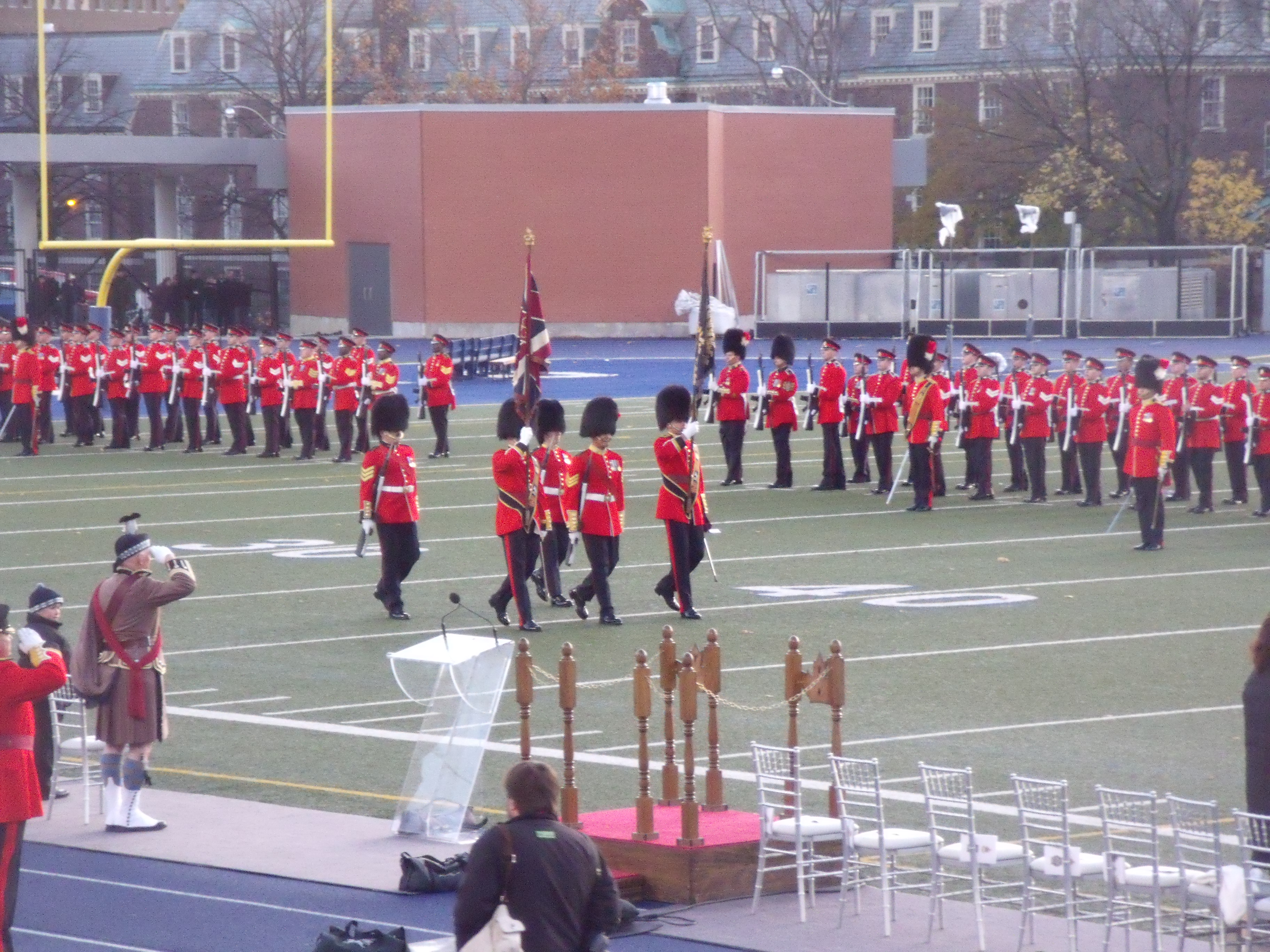
The Royal Regiment of Canada's full dress uniform includes a scarlet tunic.

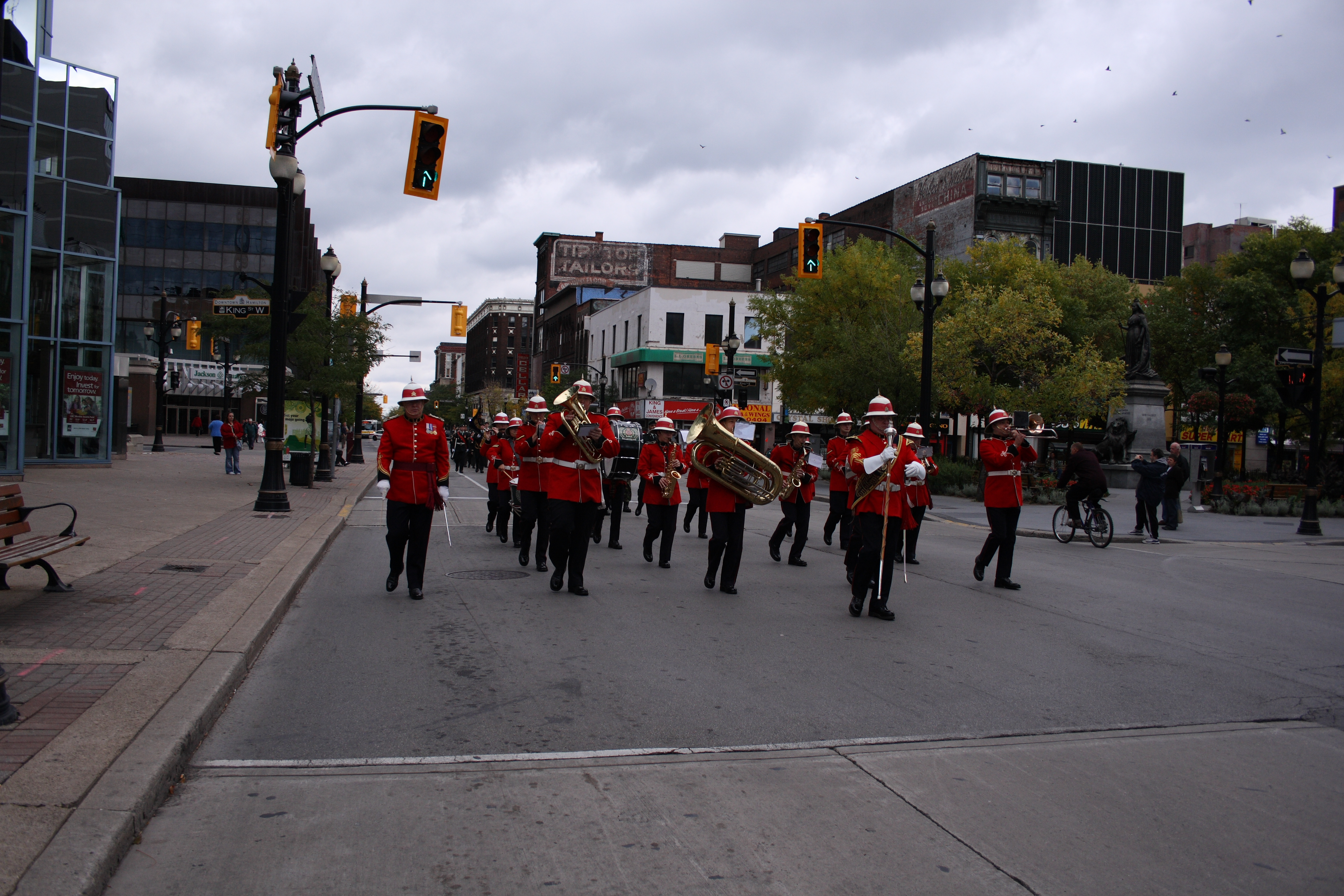
The Royal Hamilton Light Infantry's full dress headgear is a Wolseley helmet with a scarlet puggaree

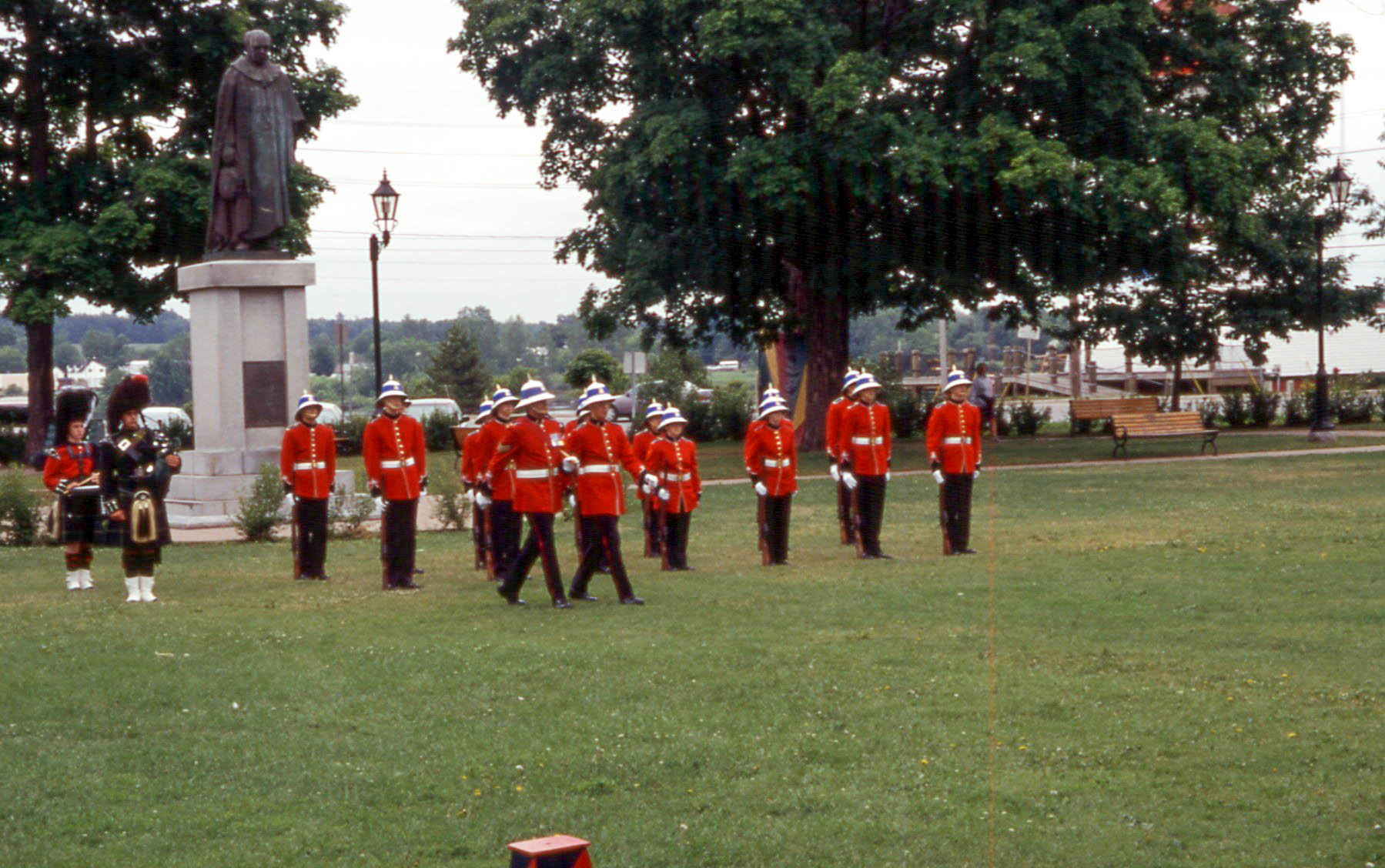
The Royal New Brunswick Regiment's full dress uniform includes a Wolseley helmet with a blue puggaree.

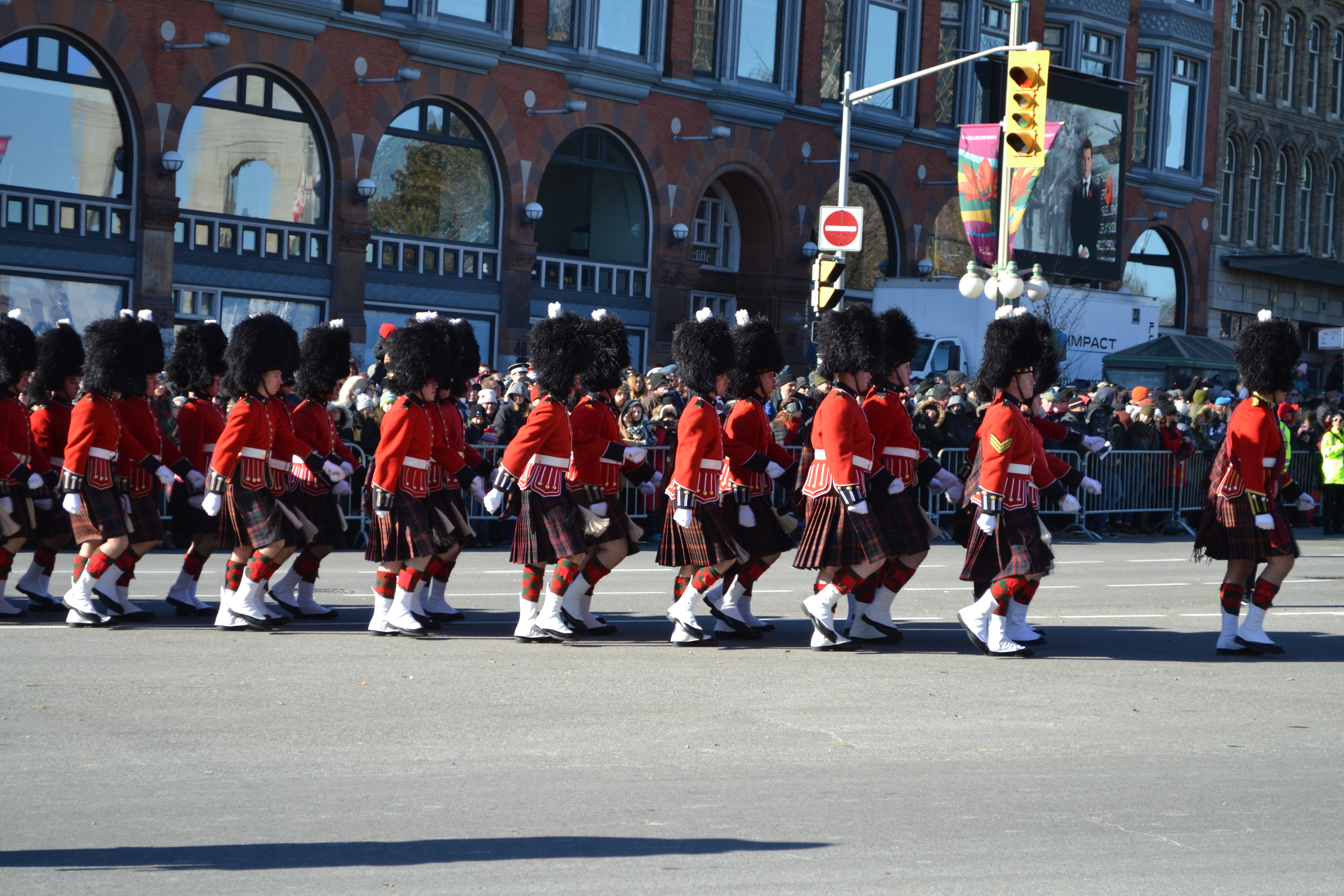
The Cameron Highlanders of Ottawa full dress uniform features a scarlet doublet and feather bonnet

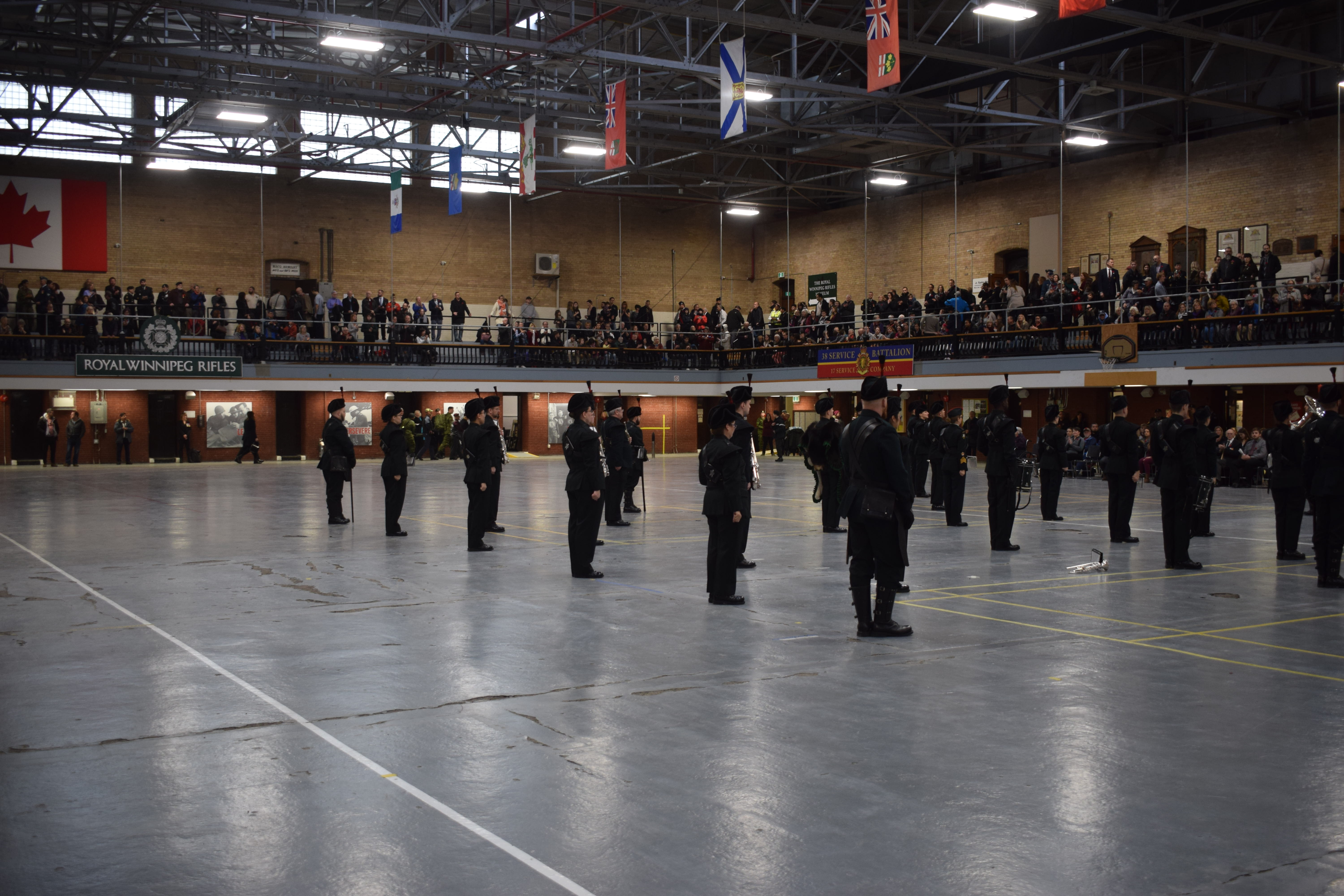
The Royal Winnipeg Rifles full dress uniform features a busby and a rifle green tunic.

==== Regular Force regiments ====
The following regular force regiments have authorized full dress (No. 1B).

Regiment	Headgear	Jacket	Trousers or kilt
Royal Canadian Horse Artillery	Busby, scarlet bag, white over scarlet plume	Blue light-cavalry jacket, scarlet facings, yellow frogging, blue cuffs, yellow Austrian knot	Blue trousers, scarlet stripe
The Royal Canadian Dragoons	Brass helmet, black plume	Scarlet tunic, blue facings, yellow heavy-cavalry knot	Blue trousers, yellow stripe
Lord Strathcona's Horse (Royal Canadians)	Brass helmet, red and white plume	Scarlet tunic, myrtle green facings, yellow heavy-cavalry knot	Blue trousers, yellow stripe
12^{e} Régiment blindé du Canada	Black beret	Scarlet tunic, yellow facings, yellow heavy-cavalry knot	Blue trousers, yellow stripe
The Royal Regiment of Canadian Artillery	Busby, scarlet bag, white plume	Blue tunic, scarlet facings, blue cuffs, yellow Austrian knot	Blue trousers, scarlet stripe
The Royal Canadian Regiment	White Wolseley helmet, scarlet puggaree	Scarlet tunic, blue facings, white piping	Blue trousers, scarlet stripe
Princess Patricia's Canadian Light Infantry	White Wolseley helmet, French grey puggaree	Scarlet tunic, French grey facings, white piping	Blue trousers, scarlet stripe
Royal 22^{e} Régiment	Bearskin cap, scarlet plume	Scarlet tunic, blue facings, white piping	Blue trousers, scarlet stripe

==== Reserve Force regiments ====
The following reserve force regiments have authorized full dress (No. 1B) and undress (Nos. 1C and 1D, also known as patrol dress) uniforms.

Regiment	Full dress headgear Undress headgear	Full dress jacket Undress jacket	Trousers or kilt
The Governor General's Horse Guards	White metal helmet, scarlet plume	Blue tunic, scarlet facings, white heavy-cavalry knot	Blue trousers, scarlet stripe
The Governor General's Horse Guards	Forage cap with scarlet band	Blue jacket, shoulder chain mail	Blue trousers, scarlet stripe
8th Canadian Hussars (Princess Louise's)	Blue busby, white bag and plume	Blue hussar tunic, white facings, yellow light-cavalry knot	Blue trousers, two yellow stripes
8th Canadian Hussars (Princess Louise's)	Black beret	Blue jacket, shoulder chain mail	Blue trousers, two yellow stripes
The Ontario Regiment (RCAC)	Black beret	Scarlet tunic, blue facings, yellow heavy-cavalry knot	Blue trousers (NCM/NCO) Black trousers (Officer), yellow stripe
The Ontario Regiment (RCAC)	Black beret	Blue jacket (NCM/NCO) Black jacket (Officer), shoulder chain mail	Blue trousers (NCM/NCO) Black trousers (Officer), yellow stripe
The Queen's York Rangers (1st American Regiment) (RCAC)	Black beret	Green tunic, blue amethyst facings, white heavy-cavalry knot	Blue trousers, yellow stripe
The Queen's York Rangers (1st American Regiment) (RCAC)	Black beret	Blue jacket, shoulder chain mail	Blue trousers, yellow stripe
Sherbrooke Hussars	Wolseley helmet, blue pugaree	Blue hussar tunic, blue facings, yellow light-cavalry knot	Blue trousers, two yellow stripes
Sherbrooke Hussars	Black beret	Blue jacket, shoulder chain mail	Blue trousers, two yellow stripes
12^{e} Régiment blindé du Canada	Black beret	Scarlet tunic, yellow facings, heavy-cavalry knot	Blue trousers, yellow stripe
12^{e} Régiment blindé du Canada	Black beret	Blue jacket, shoulder chain mail	Blue trousers, yellow stripe
1st Hussars	Busby, buff bag, white plume	Blue hussar tunic, buff facings, yellow light-cavalry knot	Blue trousers, two white stripes
1st Hussars	Black beret	Blue jacket, shoulder chain mail	Blue trousers, two white stripes
The Prince Edward Island Regiment (RCAC)	Wolseley helmet, yellow over red plume	Scarlet tunic, yellow facings	Blue trousers, yellow stripe
The Prince Edward Island Regiment (RCAC)	Black beret	Blue jacket, shoulder chain mail	Blue trousers, yellow stripe
The Royal Canadian Hussars (Montreal)	Busby, white bag and plume	Blue hussar tunic, white facings, yellow light-cavalry knot	Blue trousers, two white stripes
The Royal Canadian Hussars (Montreal)	Scarlet forage cap	Blue jacket, shoulder chain mail	Blue trousers, two white stripes
The British Columbia Regiment (Duke of Connaught's Own)	Black beret	Green tunic, black facings, yellow heavy-cavalry knot	Blue trousers, yellow stripe
The British Columbia Regiment (Duke of Connaught's Own)	Black beret	Blue jacket, shoulder chain mail	Blue trousers, yellow stripe
The South Alberta Light Horse	Wolseley helmet	Scarlet tunic, yellow facings, light-cavalry knot	Blue trousers, two yellow stripes
The South Alberta Light Horse	Brown Stetson or black beret	Blue jacket, shoulder chain mail	Blue trousers, two yellow stripes
The Saskatchewan Dragoons	Wolseley helmet	Scarlet tunic, blue facings, yellow heavy-cavalry knot	Blue trousers, yellow stripe
The Saskatchewan Dragoons	Black beret	Blue jacket, shoulder chain mail	Blue trousers, yellow stripe
The King's Own Calgary Regiment (RCAC)	Black beret	Scarlet tunic, Oxford blue facings, yellow heavy-cavalry knot	Blue trousers, yellow stripe
The King's Own Calgary Regiment (RCAC)	Black beret	Blue jacket, shoulder chain mail	Blue trousers, yellow stripe
The British Columbia Dragoons	Wolseley helmet	Scarlet tunic, blue facings, yellow heavy-cavalry knot	Blue trousers, yellow stripe
The British Columbia Dragoons	Black beret	Blue jacket, shoulder chain mail	Blue trousers, yellow stripe
The Fort Garry Horse	Wolseley helmet	Scarlet tunic, yellow facings, yellow heavy-cavalry knot	Blue trousers, yellow stripe
The Fort Garry Horse	Black beret	Blue jacket, shoulder chain mail	Blue trousers, yellow stripe
Le Régiment de Hull (RCAC)	Black beret	Scarlet tunic, blue facings, yellow heavy-cavalry knot	Blue trousers, yellow stripe
Le Régiment de Hull (RCAC)	Black beret	Blue jacket, shoulder chain mail	Blue trousers, yellow stripe
The Windsor Regiment (RCAC)	Black beret	Scarlet tunic, black facings, yellow heavy-cavalry knot	Blue trousers, two white stripes
The Windsor Regiment (RCAC)	Black beret	Blue jacket, shoulder chain mail	Blue trousers, two white stripes
The Royal Regiment of Canadian Artillery	Busby, scarlet bag, white plume	Blue tunic, scarlet facings, blue cuffs	Blue trousers, scarlet stripe
The Royal Regiment of Canadian Artillery	Pillbox cap	Blue jacket	Blue trousers, scarlet stripe
Governor General's Foot Guards	Bearskin cap, scarlet plume	Scarlet guardsman tunic, blue facings, buttons in twos. Pipers: blue doublet	Blue trousers, scarlet stripe. Pipers: Black Watch tartan
Governor General's Foot Guards	Forage cap with white band	Blue jacket	Blue trousers, scarlet stripe. Pipers: Black Watch tartan
The Canadian Grenadier Guards	Bearskin cap, white horsehair plume	Scarlet guardsman tunic, blue facings, buttons worn singly. Pipers: blue doublet	Blue trousers, scarlet stripe. Pipers: Black Watch tartan
The Canadian Grenadier Guards	Forage cap with scarlet band	Blue jacket	Blue trousers, scarlet stripe. Pipers: Black Watch tartan
The Queen's Own Rifles of Canada	Busby, black over scarlet plume	Green rifleman tunic, scarlet facings	Green trousers, scarlet stripe
The Queen's Own Rifles of Canada	Field service cap	Green jacket	Green trousers, scarlet stripe
The Black Watch (Royal Highland Regiment) of Canada	Feather bonnet, red plume	Scarlet doublet, blue facings. Pipers: Green doublet	Black Watch tartan kilt. Pipers: Royal Stewart tartan kilt
The Black Watch (Royal Highland Regiment) of Canada	Balmoral bonnet, Tam o' Shanter, or battle bonnet depending rank and title, red hackle, or glengarry, plain border	Green coatee	Black Watch tartan kilt. Pipers: Royal Stewart tartan kilt
Les Voltigeurs de Québec	Green shako, falling green cock's feather plume	Green rifleman tunic, scarlet facings	Green trousers, scarlet stripe
Les Voltigeurs de Québec	Field service cap	Green jacket	Green trousers, scarlet stripe
The Royal Regiment of Canada	Bearskin cap, scarlet over white plume	Scarlet guardsman tunic, buttons worn singly	Blue trousers, scarlet stripe
The Royal Regiment of Canada		Blue jacket	Blue trousers, scarlet stripe
The Royal Hamilton Light Infantry (Wentworth Regiment)	Wolseley helmet, scarlet puggaree	Scarlet tunic, blue facings	Blue trousers, scarlet stripe (thick stripe in patrol dress)
The Royal Hamilton Light Infantry (Wentworth Regiment)	Forest green forage cap, scarlet band	Forest green jacket	Blue trousers, scarlet stripe (thick stripe in patrol dress)
The Princess of Wales' Own Regiment	Wolseley helmet, blue puggaree	Scarlet tunic, blue facings	Blue trousers, scarlet stripe
The Princess of Wales' Own Regiment		Blue jacket	Blue trousers, scarlet stripe
The Hastings and Prince Edward Regiment	Wolseley helmet, blue puggaree	Scarlet tunic, blue facings	Blue trousers, scarlet stripe
The Hastings and Prince Edward Regiment		Blue jacket	Blue trousers, scarlet stripe
The Lincoln and Welland Regiment	Wolseley helmet, white puggaree	Scarlet tunic, blue facings	Blue trousers, scarlet stripe
The Lincoln and Welland Regiment		Blue jacket	Blue trousers, scarlet stripe
The Royal Canadian Regiment	Wolseley helmet, scarlet puggaree	Scarlet tunic, blue facings	Blue trousers, scarlet stripe
The Royal Canadian Regiment		Blue jacket	Blue trousers, scarlet stripe
The Royal Highland Fusiliers of Canada	Balmoral, red, white, and green diced border, white fusilier hackle. Drum major: bearskin cap, white hackle.	Scarlet doublet, blue facings. Pipers: blue doublet	Mackenzie tartan kilt. Pipe band: Erskine tartan kilt and hose
The Royal Highland Fusiliers of Canada	Balmoral, red, white, and green diced border, white fusilier hackle	Blue cut-away jacket with Inverness flaps	Mackenzie tartan kilt. Pipe band: Erskine tartan kilt and hose
The Grey and Simcoe Foresters	Wolseley helmet, blue puggaree	Lincoln green facings	Blue trousers, scarlet stripe
The Grey and Simcoe Foresters		Blue jacket	Blue trousers, scarlet stripe
The Lorne Scots (Peel, Dufferin and Halton Regiment)	Feather bonnet, primrose plume	Scarlet doublet, white facings	Campbell Ancient kilt
The Lorne Scots (Peel, Dufferin and Halton Regiment)	Balmoral, red, white, and green diced border, green toorie. Drummers: Glengarry, red, white and green diced border, scarlet toorie.	Green coatee	Campbell Ancient kilt
The Brockville Rifles	Busby, black over scarlet plume	Green tunic, scarlet facings	Green trousers, scarlet stripe
The Brockville Rifles	Field service cap	Green jacket	Green trousers, scarlet stripe
Stormont, Dundas and Glengarry Highlanders		Scarlet doublet, blue facings. Pipers: green doublet	MacDonnell of Glengarry tartan kilt
Stormont, Dundas and Glengarry Highlanders	Glengarry, red and white diced border	Green coatee Hose: Blue and Green diamonds	MacDonnell of Glengarry tartan kilt
Les Fusiliers du S^{t}-Laurent	Bearskin cap, white plume	Scarlet tunic, blue facings	Blue trousers, scarlet stripe
Les Fusiliers du S^{t}-Laurent		Blue jacket	Blue trousers, scarlet stripe
Le Régiment de la Chaudière	Wolseley helmet, blue puggaree	Scarlet tunic, blue facings	Blue trousers, scarlet stripe
Le Régiment de la Chaudière		Blue jacket	Blue trousers, scarlet stripe
Royal 22^{e} Régiment	Bearskin cap, scarlet plume	Scarlet tunic, blue facings	Blue trousers, scarlet stripe
Royal 22^{e} Régiment		Blue jacket	Blue trousers, scarlet stripe
Les Fusiliers Mont-Royal	Bearskin cap, white plume	Scarlet tunic, white facings	Blue trousers, scarlet stripe
Les Fusiliers Mont-Royal		Blue jacket	Blue trousers, scarlet stripe
The Princess Louise Fusiliers	Bearskin cap, grey plume or Wolseley helmet, blue puggaree	Scarlet tunic, blue facings	Blue trousers, scarlet stripe
The Princess Louise Fusiliers	Forage cap, grey plume	Blue jacket	Blue trousers, scarlet stripe
The Royal New Brunswick Regiment	Wolseley helmet, blue puggaree	Scarlet tunic, blue facings	Blue trousers, scarlet stripe
The Royal New Brunswick Regiment		Blue jacket	Blue trousers, scarlet stripe
The West Nova Scotia Regiment	Wolseley helmet, blue puggaree	Scarlet tunic, blue facings	Blue trousers, scarlet stripe
The West Nova Scotia Regiment		Blue jacket	Blue trousers, scarlet stripe
The Nova Scotia Highlanders	Feather bonnet, white plume	Scarlet doublet, blue facings. Pipers: green doublet	MacDonald tartan kilt
The Nova Scotia Highlanders	Green balmoral, red toorie.	Green coatee	MacDonald tartan kilt
Le Régiment de Maisonneuve	Wolseley helmet, blue puggaree	Scarlet tunic, blue facings	Blue trousers, scarlet stripe
Le Régiment de Maisonneuve		Blue jacket	Blue trousers, scarlet stripe
The Cameron Highlanders of Ottawa (Duke of Edinburgh's Own)	Feather bonnet, white plume	Scarlet doublet, blue facings. Pipers: green doublet	Cameron of Erracht tartan kilt
The Cameron Highlanders of Ottawa (Duke of Edinburgh's Own)	Glengarry, plain border (pipers add eagle feather), or Balmoral, blue hackle	Green coatee	Cameron of Erracht tartan kilt
The Royal Winnipeg Rifles	Busby, black plume	Green tunic, black facings	Green trousers, black stripe
The Royal Winnipeg Rifles	Field service cap	Green jacket	Green trousers, black stripe
The Essex and Kent Scottish	Feather bonnet, white plume	Scarlet doublet, blue facings. Pipers: green doublet	MacGregor tartan kilt
The Essex and Kent Scottish	Glengarry, red, white, and blue diced border	Blue cut-away jacket	MacGregor tartan kilt
48th Highlanders of Canada	Feather bonnet, white plume	Scarlet doublet, blue facings. Pipers: green doublet	Davidson tartan kilt. Pipers: Stewart of Fingask tartan
48th Highlanders of Canada	Glengarry, red, white, and blue diced border	Green coatee	Davidson tartan kilt. Pipers: Stewart of Fingask tartan
Le Régiment du Saguenay	Wolseley helmet, blue puggaree	Scarlet tunic, blue facings	Blue trousers, scarlet stripe
Le Régiment du Saguenay		Blue jacket	Blue trousers, scarlet stripe
The Algonquin Regiment (Northern Pioneers)	Wolseley helmet, blue puggaree	Scarlet tunic, blue facings	Blue trousers, scarlet stripe
The Algonquin Regiment (Northern Pioneers)		Blue jacket	Blue trousers, scarlet stripe
The Argyll and Sutherland Highlanders of Canada (Princess Louise's)	Feather bonnet, white plume	Scarlet doublet, yellow facings	Argyll and Sutherland tartan kilt
The Argyll and Sutherland Highlanders of Canada (Princess Louise's)	Glengarry, red and white diced border	Green coatee	Argyll and Sutherland tartan kilt
The Lake Superior Scottish Regiment	Feather bonnet, white plume	Scarlet doublet, blue facings. Pipers: green doublet	MacGillivray tartan kilt
The Lake Superior Scottish Regiment	Glengarry, red, white, and blue diced border, light blue toorie	Green coatee	MacGillivray tartan kilt
The North Saskatchewan Regiment	Wolseley helmet, blue puggaree	Scarlet tunic, blue facings. Pipers: blue doublet	Blue trousers, scarlet stripe. Pipers: Mackenzie tartan kilt
The North Saskatchewan Regiment		Blue jacket	Blue trousers, scarlet stripe. Pipers: Mackenzie tartan kilt
The Royal Regina Rifles	Busby, black over scarlet plume	Green tunic, scarlet facings	Green trousers, scarlet stripe
The Royal Regina Rifles	Field service cap	Green jacket	Green trousers, scarlet stripe
The Rocky Mountain Rangers	Wolseley helmet, blue puggaree	Scarlet tunic, rifle green facings	Rifle green trousers, scarlet stripe
The Rocky Mountain Rangers		Green jacket	Rifle green trousers, scarlet stripe
The Loyal Edmonton Regiment (4th Battalion, Princess Patricia's Canadian Light Infantry)	Wolseley helmet, black puggaree	French grey facings	Blue trousers, scarlet stripe
The Loyal Edmonton Regiment (4th Battalion, Princess Patricia's Canadian Light Infantry)		Blue jacket	Blue trousers, scarlet stripe
The Queen's Own Cameron Highlanders of Canada	Feather bonnet, white plume. Pipers: Glengarry, eagle feather	Scarlet doublet, midnight blue facings. Pipers: green doublet	Cameron of Erracht tartan kilt
The Queen's Own Cameron Highlanders of Canada	Glengarry, blue hackle	Green coatee	Cameron of Erracht tartan kilt
The Royal Westminster Regiment	Wolseley helmet, scarlet puggaree	Scarlet tunic, blue facings	Blue trousers, scarlet stripe
The Royal Westminster Regiment		Blue jacket	Blue trousers, scarlet stripe
The Calgary Highlanders (10th Canadians)	Glengarry, red and white diced border	Scarlet doublet, yellow facings. Pipers: green doublet	Argyll and Sutherland tartan kilt
The Calgary Highlanders (10th Canadians)	Tam o' Shanter or balmoral (no plume)	Green coatee	Argyll and Sutherland tartan kilt
Les Fusiliers de Sherbrooke	Bearskin cap, white plume	Scarlet tunic, blue facings	Blue trousers, scarlet stripe
Les Fusiliers de Sherbrooke		Blue jacket	Blue trousers, scarlet stripe
The Seaforth Highlanders of Canada	Feather bonnet, white plume. Pipers: glengarry, cockfeathers.	Scarlet doublet, buff facings. Pipers: green doublet.	Mackenzie tartan kilt
The Seaforth Highlanders of Canada	Glengarry or balmoral, red, white, and blue diced border.	Green coatee, buff turn-back tails	Mackenzie tartan kilt
The Canadian Scottish Regiment (Princess Mary's)	Feather bonnet, white plume. Pipers add eagle feather.	Scarlet doublet, blue facings. Pipers: green doublet	Hunting Stewart tartan kilt
The Canadian Scottish Regiment (Princess Mary's)	Glengarry, red, white, and blue diced border	Blue cut-away jacket	Hunting Stewart tartan kilt
The Royal Montreal Regiment	Wolseley helmet, blue puggaree	Scarlet tunic, blue facings	Blue trousers, scarlet stripe
The Royal Montreal Regiment		Blue jacket	Blue trousers, scarlet stripe
The Irish Regiment of Canada	Feather bonnet, white plume	Scarlet cut-away tunic, dark green facings	O'Saffron tartan
The Irish Regiment of Canada	Caubeen, green hackle	Green cut-away jacket	O'Saffron tartan
The Toronto Scottish Regiment (Queen Elizabeth the Queen Mother's Own)	Feather bonnet, blue hackle	Hodden grey doublet, blue facings	Hodden grey kilt
The Toronto Scottish Regiment (Queen Elizabeth the Queen Mother's Own)	Glengarry, white, Skye blue, and Hodden grey diced border, Skye blue toorie	Hodden grey cut-away jacket	Hodden grey kilt
Royal Newfoundland Regiment	Wolseley helmet, blue puggaree	Scarlet tunic, blue facings	Blue trousers, scarlet stripe
Royal Newfoundland Regiment		Blue jacket	Blue trousers, scarlet stripe

=== Royal Canadian Air Force ===
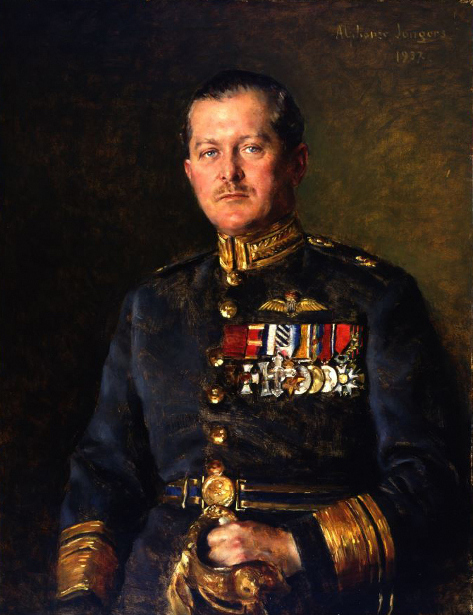
Air Marshal William Avery Bishop, VC in prewar RCAF full dress uniform.

Full dress uniforms for units of the RCAF include a blue tunic, and blue trousers and facings. Air Force pipe bands are the only RCAF units authorized to wear full-dress uniform.

Type of unit	Headgear	Jacket	Trousers or kilt
Pipe bands	Feather bonnet, blue plume	Air force blue doublet, air force blue facings	RCAF tartan
Pipe bands	Glengarry, light blue toorie	Air force blue doublet, air force blue facings	RCAF tartan

==== History ====
From 1925 to 1940, full dress was authorized for all commissioned officers of the RCAF. It was optional for all officers when first introduced, and from 1 August 1935 was mandatory only after five year's paid service in the Permanent Active Air Force or on substantive promotion to the rank of flight lieutenant. On 30 August 1940, the wear of full dress and mess dress was "suspended for the duration of hostilities". Full dress was subsequently removed from the RCAF dress regulations in 1944 and, unlike mess dress, was not re-introduced following the end of the Second World War.

=== Royal Canadian Navy ===
Full dress for members of the RCN includes a navy blue tunic and trousers with white facings, although the Canadian Forces dress instructions state that naval full dress is no longer issued. The Navy undress uniform is the only undress uniform usually purchased by individuals, and consists of a high-collared white jacket, worn with issued white DEU trousers. Nos 1 (Accoutrements), 1A, and 2B in the forces' order of dress are based on the command's service dress uniform.

=== Royal Military College of Canada ===
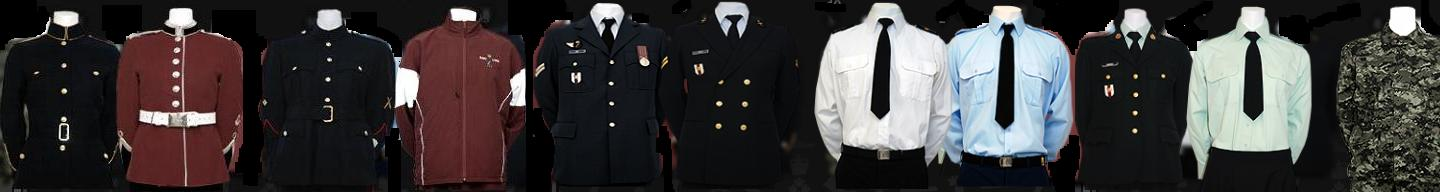
Uniforms of the Royal Military College of Canada

At the Royal Military College of Canada, cadets wear a variety of badges, depending on their proficiency and rank. The gold thread crossed pistols are awarded as a military badge for marksmanship when marksman levels are achieved for the pistol; a crown is awarded in May to the top score in the college. The gold thread cross swords in a laurel wreath military proficiency badge is awarded if the following conditions have been met by the student: a mark of at least B in military assessment; positive leadership qualities in the summer training report; an academic average of at least 70%; a mark of at least B in physical training; a satisfactory mark in the bilingualism profile; A crown is awarded to the top cadet having received this award, by year. Students are awarded a blue maple leaf for the minimum bilingual profile standard of BBB. If they achieve higher bilingual proficiency, they receive a silver or gold maple leaf. An academic distinction badge is awarded to a student with an academic average of at least 80% at the end of the year. Physical fitness badges are awarded upon reaching a certain number of points.

As cadets learn and demonstrate leadership skills, they are appointed to different positions. The number of bars increases from zero to five as students are promoted.

There are 5 no-bar positions and 15 two-bar positions. The brass or gold thread lyre is awarded as a proficiency badge for brass and reed by the band officer when a student is considered capable of participating in parades. A brass or gold treble clef is awarded by the band officer as a proficiency badge for choir when a student is considered to be ready for concerts. A brass or gold thread pipe is awarded by the band officer as a proficiency badge for pipes when a student is considered capable of participating in parades. A brass or gold thread drum is awarded as a proficiency badge for drums by the band officer when a student is considered capable of participating in parades. The brass or gold thread thistle is awarded by the band officer as a proficiency badge for Scottish highland dance when a student is considered capable of participating in parades.

== Mess dress ==
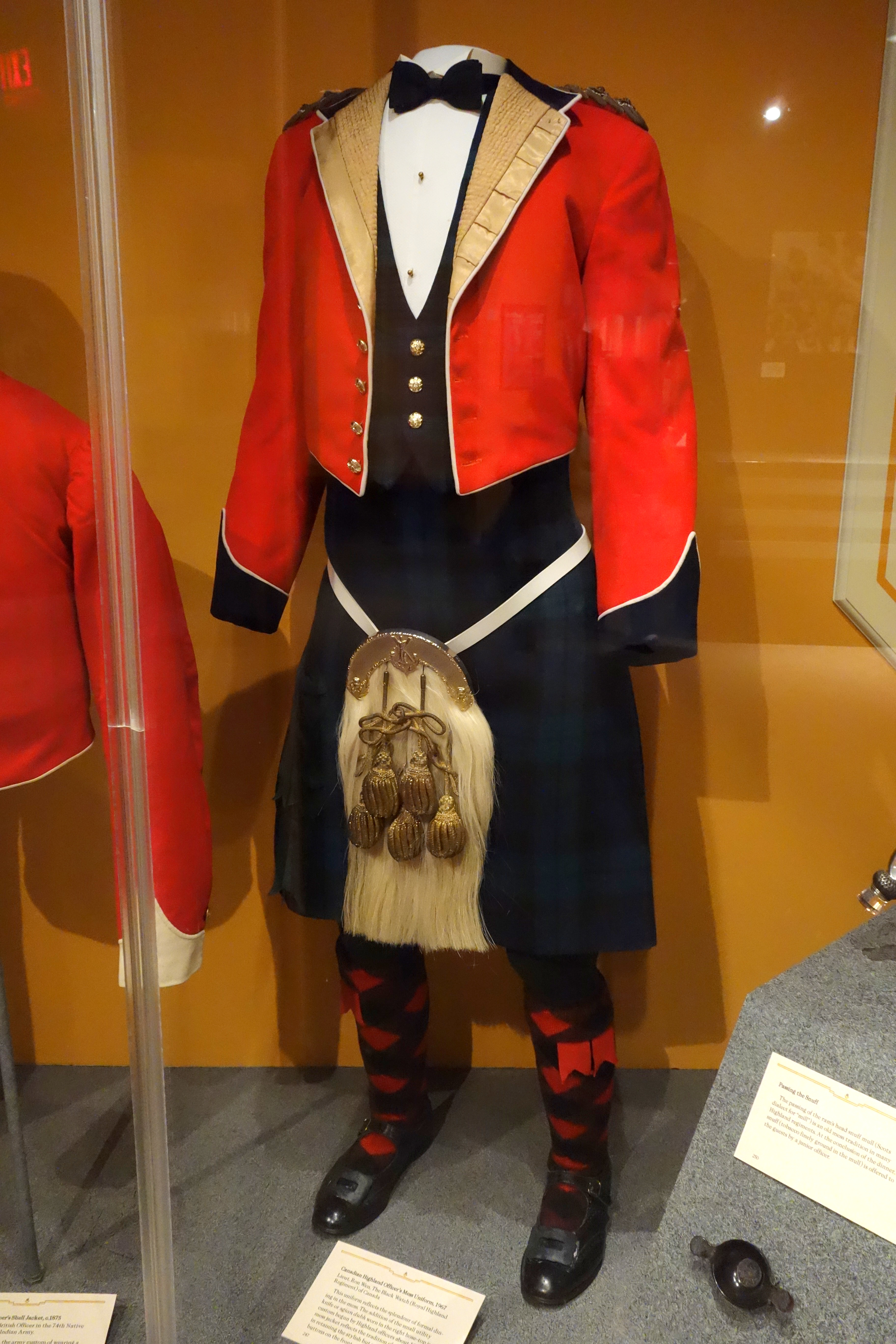
The mess uniform for an officer of The Black Watch (Royal Highland Regiment) of Canada.

Mess dress uniforms are traditional military evening wear purchased by individual members. Regular force officers are required to purchase mess dress within 6 months of being commissioned. Non-commissioned members and reserve force officers may purchase mess dress or wear the issued DEU (see § Service dress) uniform with a white shirt and bow tie (No. 2B dress). The Navy, Army, and Air Force each have unique patterns of mess dress. Within the Army, each personnel branch has its own pattern with authorized differences from the standard Army pattern; most armoured and infantry regiments have further differences from their standard branch patterns. Women may wear trousers or a long skirt.

Environment	Jacket	Shirt	Waistcoat or cummerbund	Trousers or skirt
Navy	Navy blue mess jacket (tailcoat for Capt(N) and above)	White dress shirt with black bow tie (crossover tab tie optional for women)	White waistcoat or branch pattern cummerbund	Navy blue, gold stripe for officers and CPO1
Army (universal pattern)	Scarlet mess jacket with lapels and cuffs in midnight blue or other authorized branch or regimental colour, additional gold cuff embellishments for officers, "infantry" cuffs unless otherwise authorized	White dress shirt with black bow tie (white pleated shirt with gold buttons optional for women)	Midnight blue waistcoat or branch cummerbund according to branch or regimental tradition	Midnight blue, branch or regimental stripe. Regimental tartan for Scottish or kilted Irish regiments, who may wear a kilt instead of trousers or skirt
Air Force	Air force blue mess jacket (optional No 2A white summer jacket is worn by officers only)	White dress shirt with black bow tie (white pleated shirt with gold buttons optional for women)	White waistcoat for officers and CWOs, RCAF tartan cummerbund for MWOs and below	Air force blue, gold stripe for officers and CWOs, blue stripe for MWOs and below

== Service dress ==
Each environment is assigned a distinctive "duty uniform," known as service dress, or No. 3 Dress.

The service dress uniform consists of an environmental pattern jacket, long- or short-sleeved dress shirt, necktie, trousers (skirt optional for women), and black oxfords or ankle boots. Jackets, trousers, skirts, neckties, sweaters (for No. 3C), scarves, raincoats, overcoat, and parkas are in the specific environmental colours of navy blue (actually black) for the navy, rifle green for the army, air force blue for the air force, and olive green for the special operations branch; shirts are white, linden green, light blue, and tan, respectively.

=== Navy ===
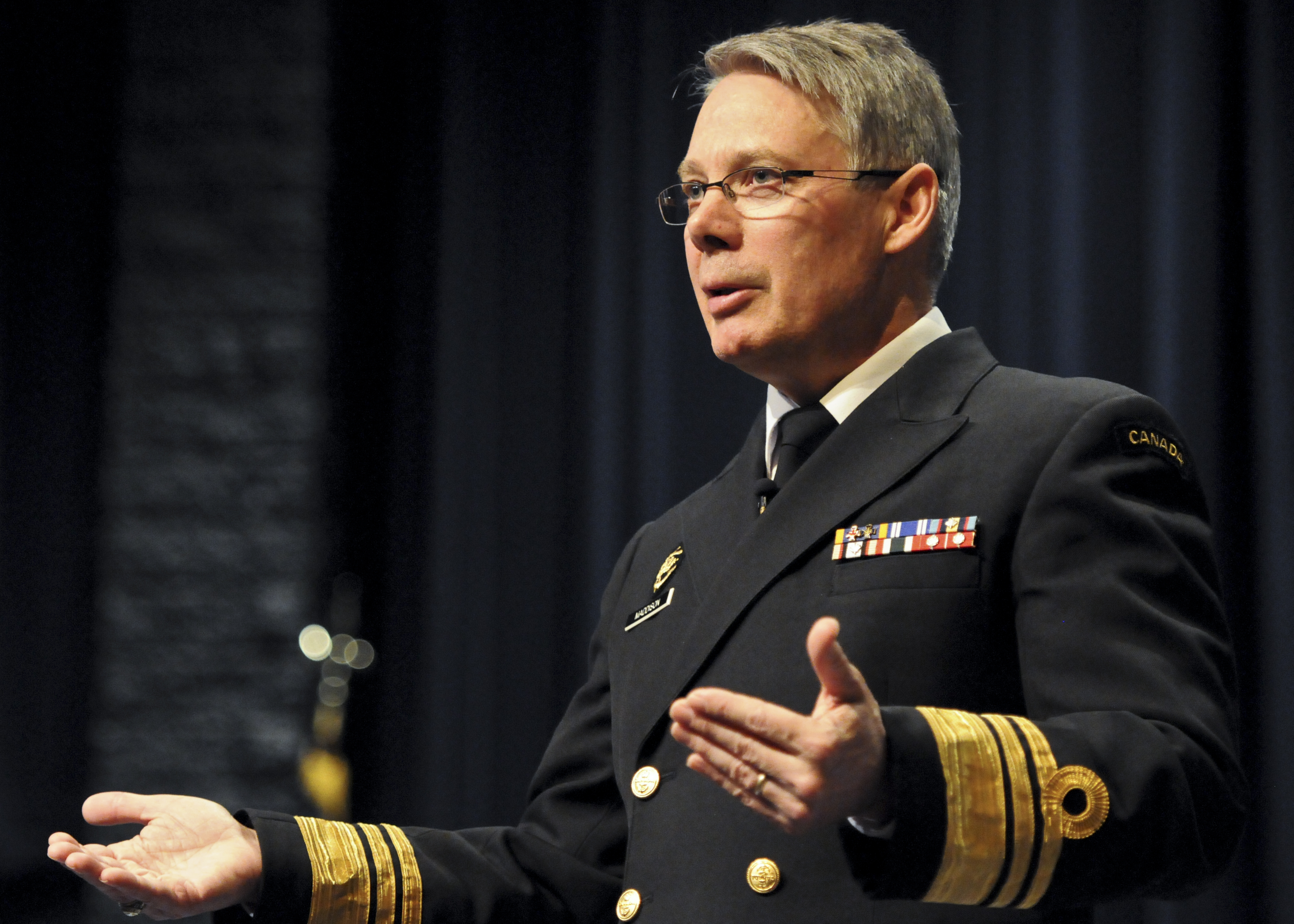
No. 3 Service Dress

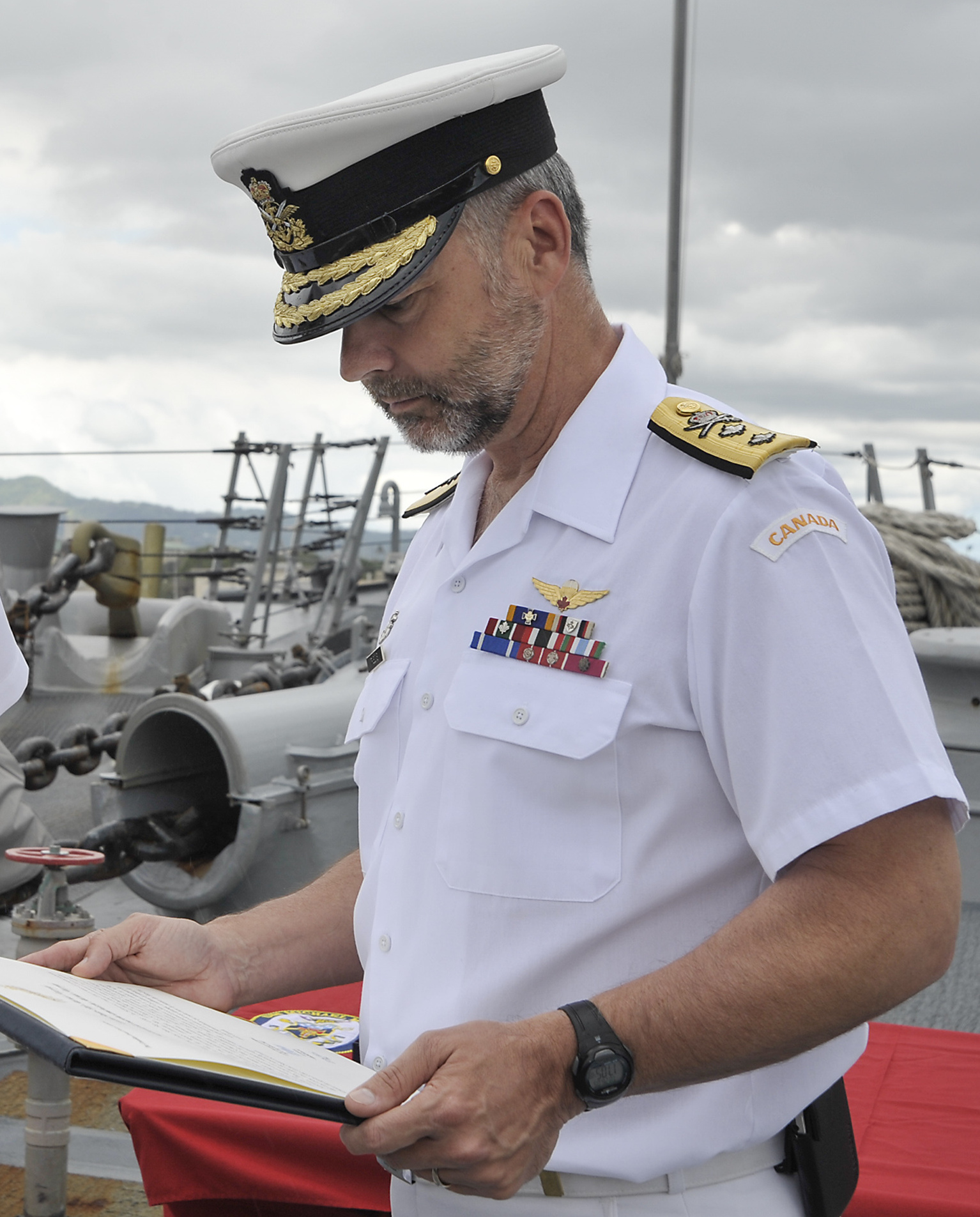
No. 3B Service Dress

Officers of the Royal Canadian Navy in service dress

Naval personnel are issued a "navy blue" (actually a tone of black according to Canadian Forces Dress Instructions) six-on-three double-breasted jacket and trousers, white shirt, and white peaked cap. For the summer periods Navy personnel may wear white trousers, a white web belt for the trousers, and white socks and shoes with No. 3B dress. These white items may also be worn with a privately purchased high-collared white tunic for No. 1C or 1D dress.

=== Army ===
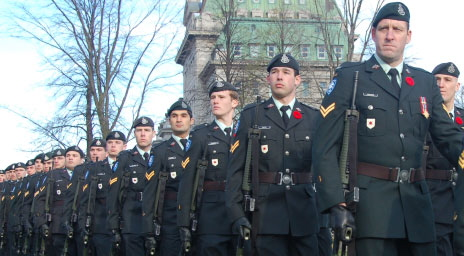
Canadian Army personnel marching in No. 1 Ceremonial Dress

Army personnel are issued new tunics and trousers similar in style to the old CF greens, but with the addition of shoulder straps. They were originally issued in heavyweight rifle green (worn with the old CF green dress shirt) for winter wear, and lighter-weight tan for summer; in the latter case, headgear, neckties, belts and badges were still rifle-green or on rifle-green backing. Only the Army retained the branch or regimental collar badges on the dress jacket, such non-traditional devices having been abandoned on Navy and Air Force jackets. Army personnel were also issued epaulettes that could be sewn to the old CF green service dress tunic to convert it into a "new" DEU tunic. The tan summer uniform was discontinued in the mid-1990s in favour of the green uniform to address complaints of soldiers needing to maintain multiple uniforms.

Beginning in the 1990s, the peaked service cap was phased out for Army personnel with the exceptions of certain reserve regiments (e.g. Canadian Grenadier Guards), instructors of the Royal Regiment of Canadian Artillery School at Gagetown, and as an optional item for wear by general officers, with the beret (except in Scottish and Highland regiments) issued as the universal Army headgear for service dress. More recently, the heavy combat sweater was retired, replaced with a lighter-weight V-neck sweater for service dress wear, and with a fleece sweatshirt for operational wear.

=== Air Force ===
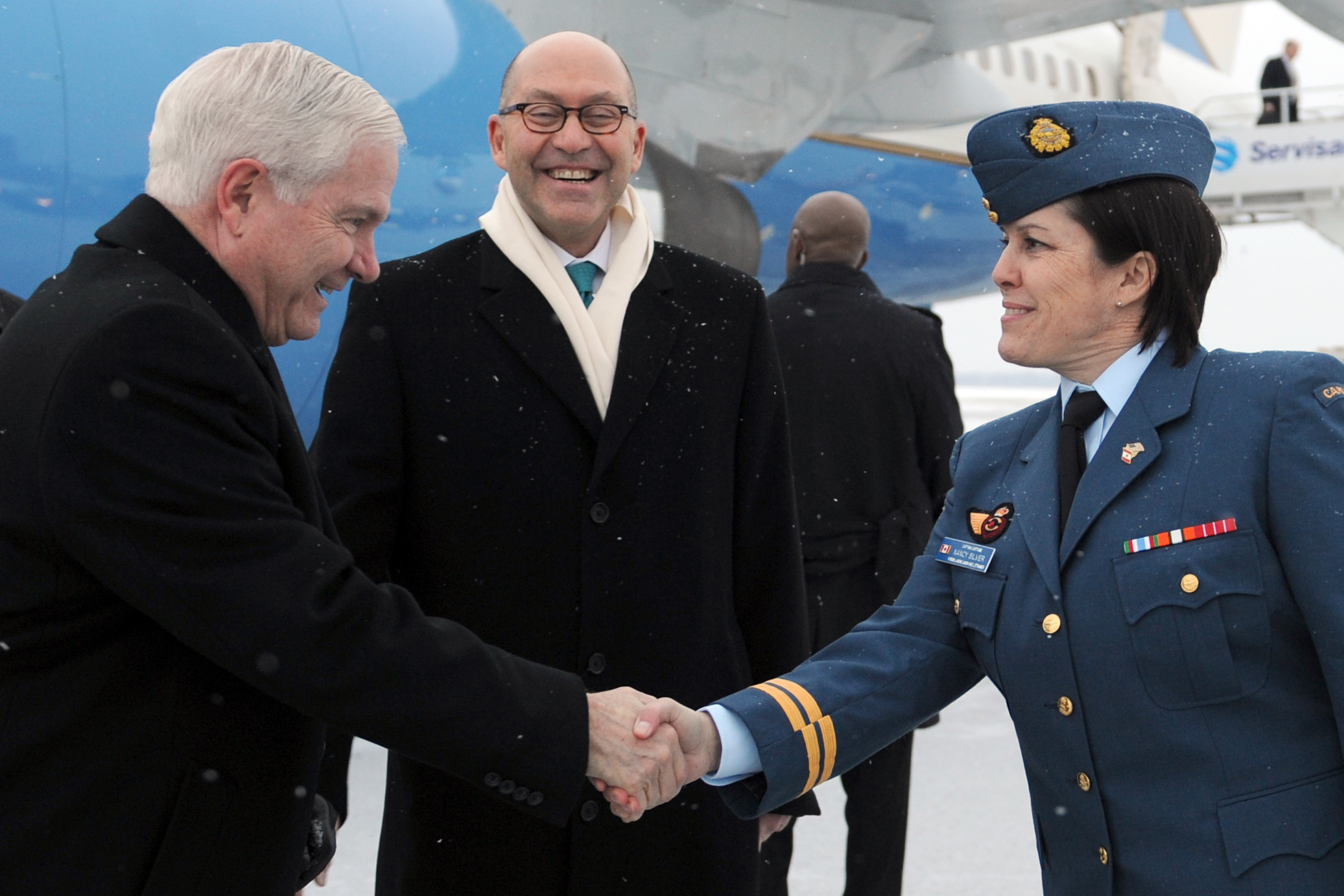
A captain (right foreground) of the Royal Canadian Air Force in No. 3 Service Dress

Personnel in the Air Force are issued a uniform of a similar cut to the old CF greens, but in blue, with a light-blue shirt, black necktie, and air force blue wedge cap. Air personnel were also issued a blue beret for wear when appropriate; it was soon authorized as was the blue flyer's jacket and Gore-Tex "line" jackets for use with work dress, then with service dress. When the blue uniform was introduced, the rank insignia and buttons retained the gold colour used by the CF greens. In 2015, this was changed to pearl grey rank insignia and silver buttons.

=== Special Operations Forces ===
In 2017 the Canadian Special Operations Forces Command began to wear DEUs that are distinct from the Navy, Army, and Air Force. The uniform consists of a dark olive five-button jacket, light olive trousers bloused over black jump boots, light khaki shirt and olive tie, and a tan beret.

=== Purple trades ===
For military occupations that are not specifically designated to a particular environment (e.g. administrators, military police, medical personnel, etc.), an environment is usually assigned or may be requested on enrolment. Due to the way that members of these "purple trades" frequently have environments different from their current assignments, many units, when in ceremonial, service or mess dress, will display a mix of Navy, Army, and Air Force uniforms. As various specialty courses become more widely available, no longer restricted only to "soldiers" or "sailors", for example, it is not unheard-of to see a Navy HRA/FSA in a tactical air squadron with parachutist's wings, or an Air Force medic in a tank regiment with a submariner's "dolphins" badge.

== Operational dress ==
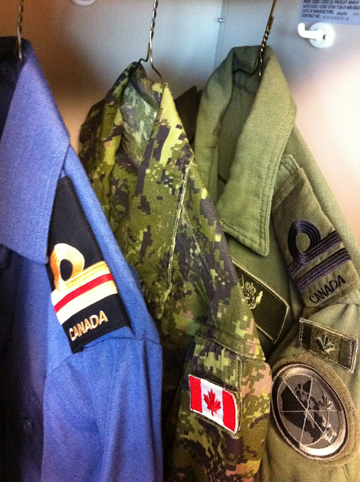
Different operational uniforms are provided for naval, field and air operations.

Originally specialized uniforms for wear in an operational (i.e. combat) theatre, operational dress uniforms have now superseded No 4 uniform for everyday wear in garrison. The operational dress uniforms are naval environmental combat uniform (NECU) for the Navy, CADPAT "field combat clothing" for the Army and Air Force, and olive green "flying clothing" for aircrew.

=== Combat clothing ===
Canadian Forces presently use Canadian Disruptive Pattern (CADPAT) camouflage on their combat uniforms, replacing the olive-green-coloured combat uniform between 1997 and the mid-2000s. CADPAT camouflaged clothing items include shirts, pants, raingear, parkas, and fleece sweaters. CADPAT uniforms are worn by army and air force personnel (as well as navy personnel attached to army or air force units while in the field) as operational dress.

Currently the CADPAT Multi Terrain (MT) variant is issued, replacing the earlier CADPAT Temperate Woodland (TW) and CADPAT Arid Regions (AR) variants. CADPAT MT is brown dominated, complemented with blacks, greens and tan. For winter conditions, personnel were issued white mukluks, mitts, and balaclavas, as well as white camouflage covers for their parkas, trousers, helmets, and rucksacks. Lightweight coats, rain suits, parkas, and other tactical clothing (in CADPAT) is also issued to deal with different weather conditions.

==== History ====
Until the early 1960s, the Army battle dress uniform was worn both on parades and in combat. It was common to maintain traditional regimental distinctions, even in the thick of battle. A notable exception to this was the Highland regiments, who were ordered to cease wearing their kilts in 1939 in favour of more generic service dress, the kilt being deemed "unsuitable for modern war".

By the time of the Korean War, more comfortable combat clothing was being designed, notably "bush dress", in dark-green cotton and bearing a resemblance to the khaki drill uniform of the Second World War. Lightweight service dress known as "T-dubs" were issued for parades in the summer months.

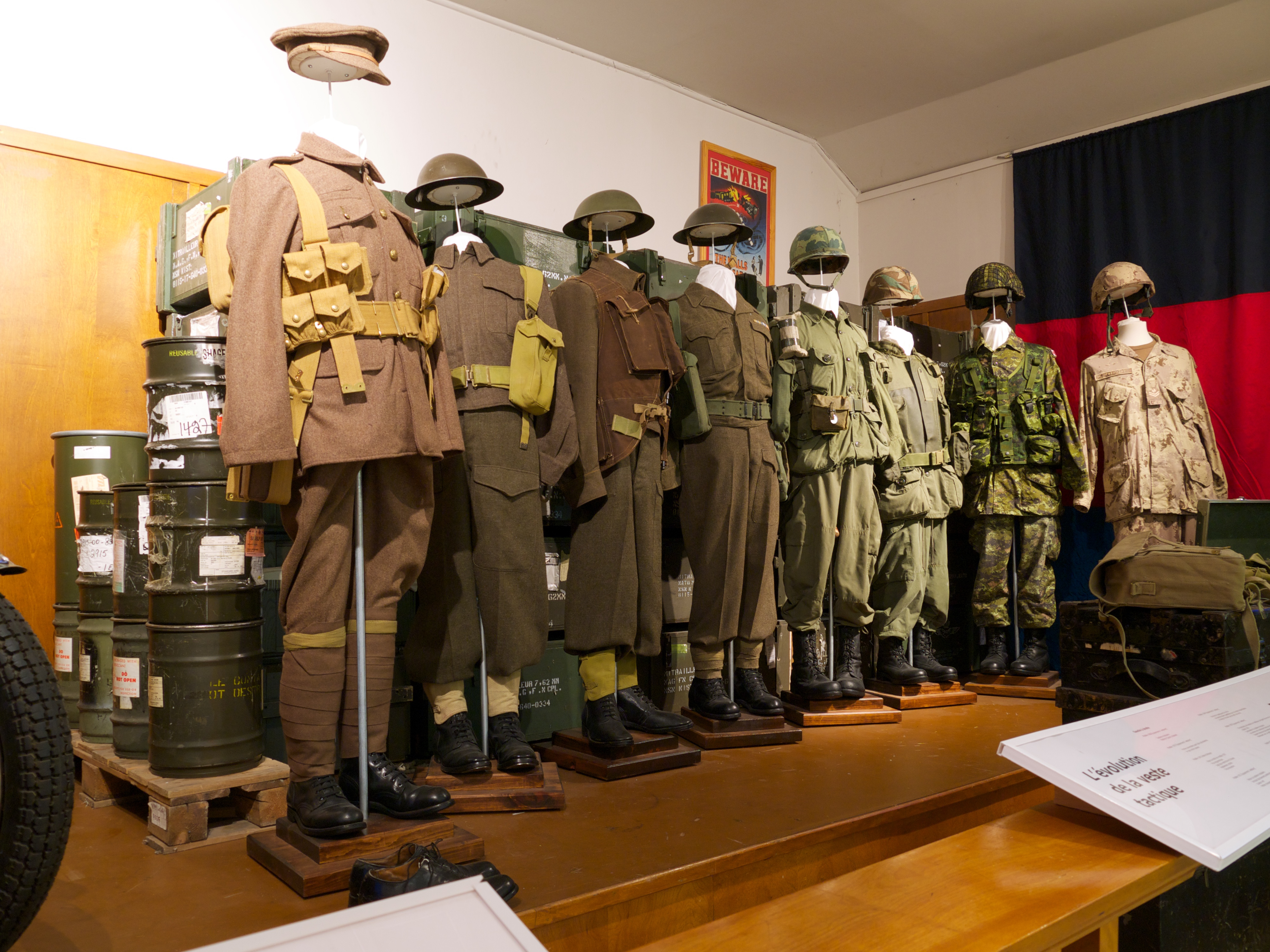
Operational uniforms used by the Canadian Army from the early 20th century to present day on display.

In the early 1960s, battle dress was replaced for field wear by the combat uniform, often referred to merely as "combats". It was issued as a standard order of dress for the pre-Unification Army, and later Regular Force "army" personnel in field units of Force Mobile Command and for personnel in field units or detachments in Canadian Forces Communication Command, as well as for personnel in other organizations as required for employment in a land combat environment. Combat uniforms were not issued to reservists until 1972, although they were permitted to wear it if they purchased it themselves (usually at war surplus stores).

The Combat Uniform consisted of a long-sleeve olive green (OG) shirt/coat, with two voluminous cargo pockets at the hip and two slanted pockets (designed for the 20-round C1 rifle magazine) at the breast, and drawstrings at the waist and hem; OG trousers, with regular pockets at the front and back and a large cargo patch pocket on each thigh, drawstrings at the cuff, and buttons on the belt loops for the attachment of optional suspenders; an OG V-neck undershirt; and black combat boots, with trouser cuffs bloused over. Berets were often worn, but a soft OG Combat Cap or the M1 helmet (which were often worn with camouflage covers or Scrim nets) could be worn instead as the tactical situation dictated. At the time of adoption, the OG colour was a standard among NATO forces; however, as other NATO forces adopted camouflage uniforms (for example, the British Disruptive Pattern Material uniforms, or the Americans their woodland camouflage Battle Dress Uniforms, the Canadian Forces quickly became one of the few first-world militaries not to adopt camouflage garments.

Soldier wearing CADPAT Temperate Woodland. CADPAT combat uniforms were first introduced in the 1990s

In the late 1980s, the CF experimented with an alternative combat shirt designed by an Air Command officer. The Mark III Combat Shirt had flat breast pockets and lacked the hip cargo pockets and drawstrings. It was designed to be tucked into the trousers like a regular shirt if desired, or worn untucked like the older-style shirt. It proved rather unpopular from an operational standpoint due to its lack of storage capacity, and was considered to look sloppier than the older style; few were issued after initial stocks were depleted, but the Mark III was worn alongside the earlier marks by some individuals until the adoption of CADPAT throughout the Army in the late 1990s. Parts of the OG Combat Uniform are in use in small numbers by the Canadian Cadets Organizations, and are temporarily issued to Sea Cadets who do not have FTUs at summer training centres. Army and Air Cadets are issued Field Training Uniforms which are olive green versions of the first pattern CADPAT uniform.

Officers displayed their rank on slip-ons on the epaulettes of the shirt or jacket; non-commissioned members wore small OD versions of their rank insignia stitched in the centre of the upper sleeve, although for a period in the 1980s these were stitched onto slip-ons, ostensibly to save wear-and-tear on the uniforms, but also providing the ability to remove rank for security purposes. The national identifier consisted of a "CANADA" flash stitched on the upper shoulder just below the sleeve seam, and unit or trade identifiers were worn on slip-ons on the shirt's epaulettes; however, personnel belonging to Canadian Forces Europe and other overseas missions wore full-colour Canadian flag patches on the upper sleeve. In the 1990s, the "CANADA" flash was replaced with a subdued olive-drab Canadian flag, worn on the upper left sleeve below the epaulette. These flag badges showed up in full-colour red and white when illuminated by a blue light.

=== Flying suit ===
Canadian Armed Forces aircrew wear green flying suits as operational dress. The two-piece flying suit (originally worn only by tactical helicopter crews) and the one-piece coverall flying suit are worn interchangeably by most CF aircrew. Prior to the mid-2000s, the one-piece flying suit was blue and worn by all fixed-wing aircrew.

=== Naval combat dress ===
RCN personnel wear naval combat dress (NCD) as operational dress. NCD consists of a long-sleeved shirt worn over the standard RCN black T-shirt, and trousers. Rank insignia is worn on the front centre of the chest attached with Velcro. The member's surname is worn on the right chest and a tape reading "Navy Marine" is worn on the left. A morale patch is worn on a Velcro section on the right upper arm, and the Canadian Naval Ensign and unit patch are worn on a Velcro section on the left upper arm. Issue of the new uniform began in winter 2021 on an exchange basis as members turn in worn-out NCD-pattern uniforms.

== Occupational Dress ==
Various types of special working uniforms are worn by military police, medical personnel, dental personnel, cooks, chaplains, firefighters, stewards, and brass-reed musicians. Unlike operational dress, occupational dress uniforms are worn only by personnel actively engaged in designated tasks. Within the CAF Dress Instructions, maternity dress is also grouped in this category of "occupational, health, and safety dress".

=== Maternity dress ===
When conventional pattern uniforms are no longer comfortable or aesthetically appropriate, a pregnant woman can wear maternity dress. The non-operational maternity dress is a common-pattern ensemble in light-weight, washable material in three environmental colours. There is also a white occupational variant for medical, dental, and food services personnel, worn as well by navy personnel during the summer dress period. The ensemble consists of general-purpose items suitable for wear as alternatives to those of service dress and its ceremonial and mess derivatives. Medals and accoutrements may be worn on ceremonial dress occasions. The ensemble includes a long tunic, a short tunic, slacks, maternity shirts in both long and short sleeve, a light jacket and a maternity top-coat with a removable liner.

=== Military police ===
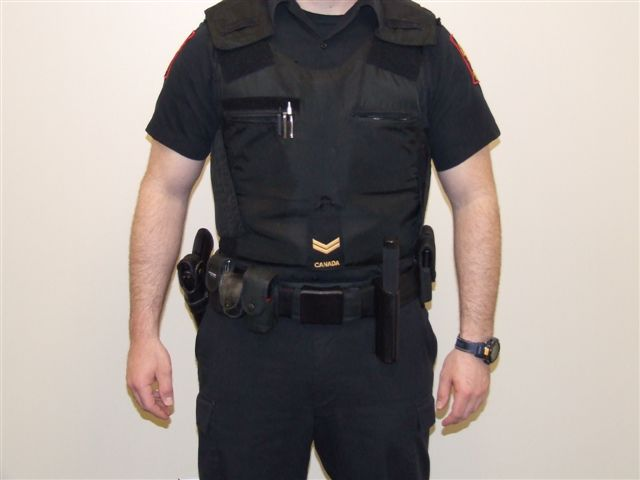
Canadian Forces Military Police's Operational Patrol Dress uniform

After unification, Canadian Forces Military Police (MPs) wore the same uniforms as other personnel, distinguished only by a few unique accoutrements: a white vinyl cover over the service cap, a gold-coloured police-style badge on the breast pocket, and/or a brassard or armlet bearing the title "MP" or "MILITARY POLICE MILITAIRE".

With the introduction of DEU, these accoutrements (except the brassards) were replaced. Now the main identifying feature of the military police was the addition of the colour red: a red service cap band for Naval and Air Force personnel, a red beret for army MPs and red backing for the cap badges of air force and navy MPs. In 2005, the dress regulations were amended to permit all MPs to wear the red beret regardless of their element, with any order of dress that may include a beret, except the number three order of dress for the Navy, in which the peaked cap is still worn, and the Air Force, in which case the Wedge is worn - both of which have a red identifier around the Military Police cap badge.

In 2001, the CF formally introduced the Military Police Operational Patrol Dress (MP OPD), a marked departure from standard military uniforms: it is immediately recognisable as a police uniform as opposed to a military one. It consists of black trousers, short-sleeved shirts for summer wear, long-sleeved collared shirts for winter, the naval pattern sweater, patrol jacket, body armour, police equipment belt and MP Gore-Tex boots, with a red beret for all MPs. It is normally authorised for wear on patrol duties only, by members up to and including the rank of Warrant Officer / Petty Officer 1st Class. Some units, however, have begun to dress all uniformed and badged MPs of all ranks (including those above Warrant Officer / Petty Officer 1st Class) and those outside of patrol duties, in MP OPD and accoutrements. This is to ensure that all MP are available at any time in the case of an Immediate Rapid Deployment (similar to the US SWAT) scenario.

== Headdress ==
Headdress is worn with all orders of dress except mess dress. Cap badges are worn on most types of headdress, with the exception of winter tuques and operational headdress (which is not usually worn in public).

=== Ball caps ===
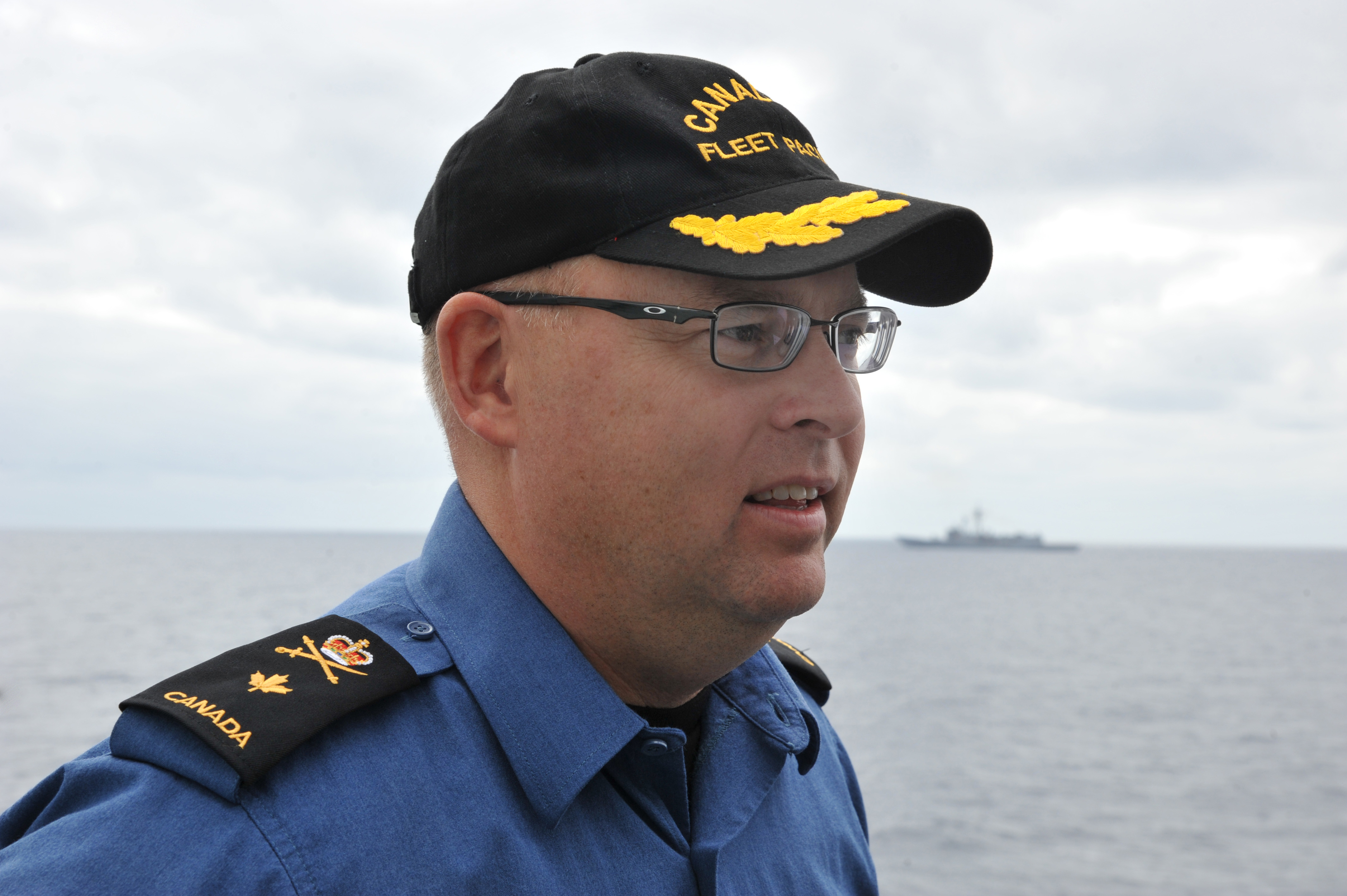
A Royal Canadian Navy commodore wearing a ball cap. Ball caps are authorized for those in naval combat dress.

Ball caps embroidered with the name of the wearer's ship or unit are worn with naval combat dress. Air Force personnel are authorized to wear the RCAF ball cap (purchased from CANEX) or may be authorized to wear squadron ball caps with CADPAT or flying suits, but only when on the flight line or aboard ship as part of a ship's helicopter detachment. As a rule of thumb, whenever saluting is required, the service cap/hat, beret, wedge, or ballcap must be worn.

=== Berets ===
The beret is still the most widely worn headgear, and is worn with almost all orders of dress with the exception of the more formal orders of Naval dress (i.e. Ceremonial, Mess, and Service Dress) and Air Force Ceremonial Dress. A regimental or branch cap badge is worn centred over the wearer's left eye, and excess material pulled to the wearer's right.

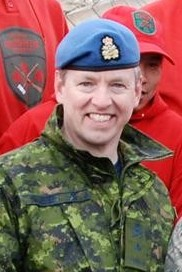
A Royal Canadian Air Force officer wearing an air force blue beret.

The colour of the beret is determined by the wearer's environment, branch, or mission. The beret colours listed below are the current standard:

Colour	Wearer
Air force blue	Air Force personnel not otherwise authorized to wear other colour
Black	Navy personnel not otherwise authorized to wear other colour, Royal Canadian Armoured Corps
CF green	Army personnel not otherwise authorized to wear other colour
UN blue	Personnel serving with the United Nations on peacekeeping missions
Scarlet	Military police
Maroon	Paratroopers serving in active jump companies
Blaze orange	Search-and-rescue technicians
Terracotta	Personnel serving with the Multinational Force and Observers
Tan	Personnel posted to CANSOFCOM, members of SOF Branch regardless of posting
Army blue	Royal Regiment of Canadian Artillery, Royal Canadian Electrical and Mechanical Engineers, Royal Canadian Corps of Signals, and Canadian Intelligence Corps
Khaki	Foot guard regiments

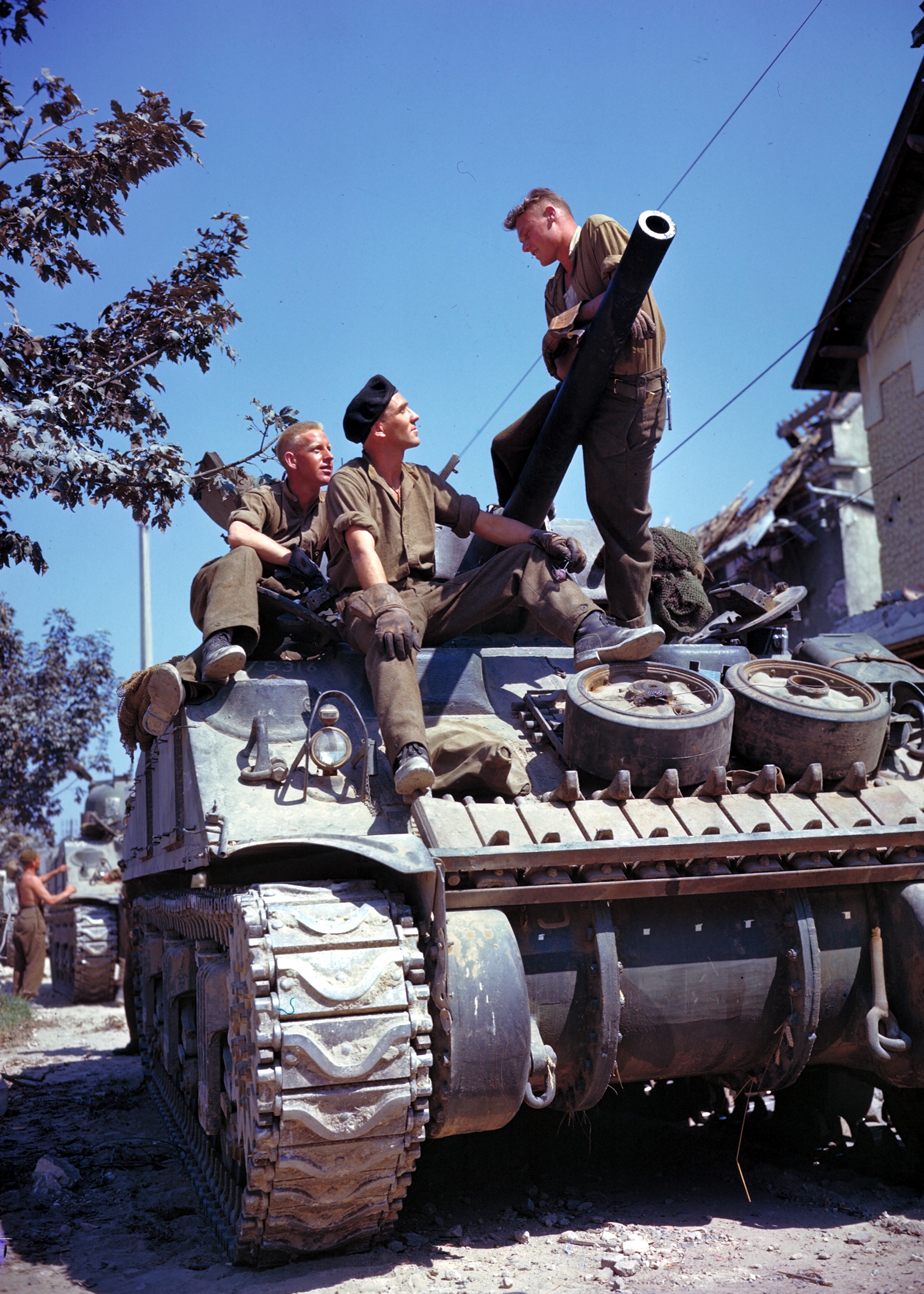
A Canadian tank crew during the Battle of Normandy. The crew member in the centre is wearing a black beret, headgear that was adopted by Canadian armoured regiments in 1937.

==== History ====
Berets were first worn in the Canadian Army in 1937 when tank regiments (at that time part of the infantry) adopted the black beret of the Royal Armoured Corps. The black beret, which is now the headdress of the Royal Canadian Armoured Corps (RCAC), was first worn by the Essex Regiment (Tank), now renamed The Windsor Regiment (RCAC). This was because the other new tank units were ordered to wear the headdress that they had while serving as infantry. The Essex Regiment (Tank) was a new unit, formed as a tank regiment, with no connection to the Infantry. As such, it picked the headdress that was worn by the Royal Tank Corps of the British Army.

During the Second World War, a khaki beret was adopted throughout the Canadian Army, with the Canadian Armoured Corps (later Royal Canadian Armoured Corps) wearing the black beret and parachute troops wearing the maroon beret adopted by British airborne forces. The 2nd Canadian Parachute Battalion (the Canadian component of the First Special Service Force) wore a red beret with the dress uniform. Wartime berets were much fuller in cut than postwar berets.

After the Second World War, a series of coloured berets were adopted, with infantry regiments wearing scarlet, rifle regiments wearing dark (rifle) green, the armoured corps wearing black, and other arms and services wearing midnight blue berets, with a large coloured "flash" in corps colours - dull cherry for the Royal Canadian Army Medical Corps, Emerald Green for the Royal Canadian Dental Corps, etc. The coloured flashes were not popular and replaced in 1956 with forage caps bearing coloured bands in corps colours. The midnight blue beret itself was retained, however.

When the Canadian Forces unified on 1 February 1968, the rifle green beret was adopted as the CF standard. The RCAC successfully fought to retain its distinctive black beret, and the Canadian Airborne Regiment wore the maroon beret until the unit was disbanded. Scottish and Irish infantry regiments wear Tam o' Shanters, glengarries, balmorals or caubeens instead of berets.

The beret is used in the Army with service dress as formal headdress (especially after the move away from the forage cap in the 1990s) as well as with CADPAT clothing as garrison dress and as a form of combat dress. Navy personnel wear the service cap and Air Force personnel the wedge cap with their service dress. In certain cases the beret is also used as Ceremonial Dress, most commonly in units of the Royal Canadian Armoured Corps.

=== Kilted regiments and pipe bands ===
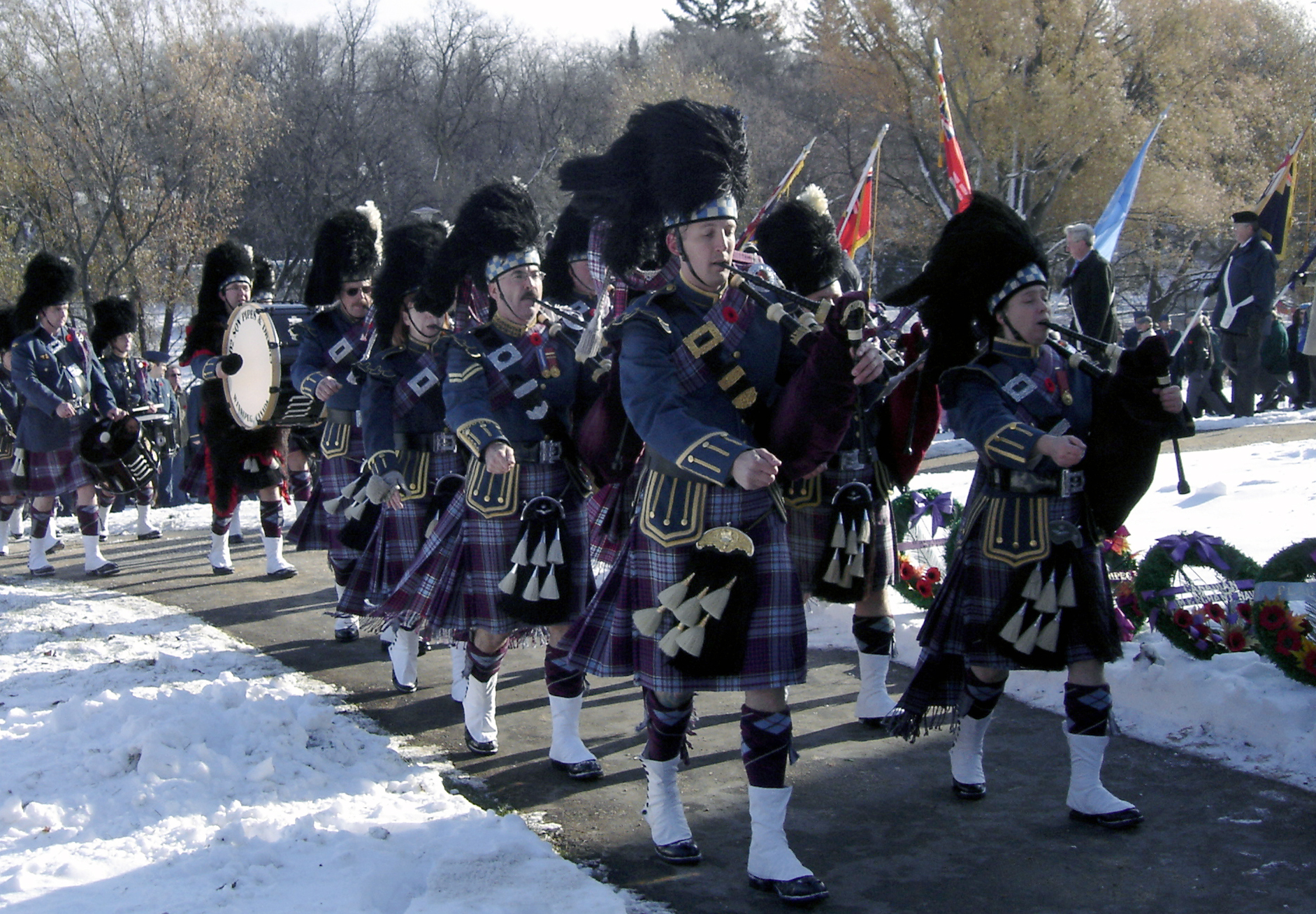
The 402 Pipes and Drums Band's full dress uniform includes a feather bonnet. The headgear is one of several traditional headdresses used by Canadian-Scottish regiments.

The balmoral, caubeen, feather bonnet, glengarry, and tam o'shanters are worn by kilted regiments and pipe bands as part of their full dress or undress uniforms. Members of such units may also wear traditional headdress with service and operational dress.

=== Service cap and hat ===
The peaked cap (or female pattern service hat) is the only headdress authorized for wear with Navy ceremonial dress. It is also worn with Navy service dress, though the beret is also allowed as an option with Nos. 3A, 3B (with black trousers), and 3C. An army version of the peaked cap is worn by foot guard regiments of the Royal Canadian Infantry Corps. Peaked cap may also be optionally worn with Nos. 1 and 1A by Army general officers or CWOs who serve alongside them. The peaked cap was formerly worn by Air Force officers and Chief Warrant Officers, but has been discontinued in favour of the wedge cap.

=== Tuques ===
Tuques or muskrat fur Yukon caps are worn with overcoats or parkas in winter. No cap badges are worn.

=== Turbans ===
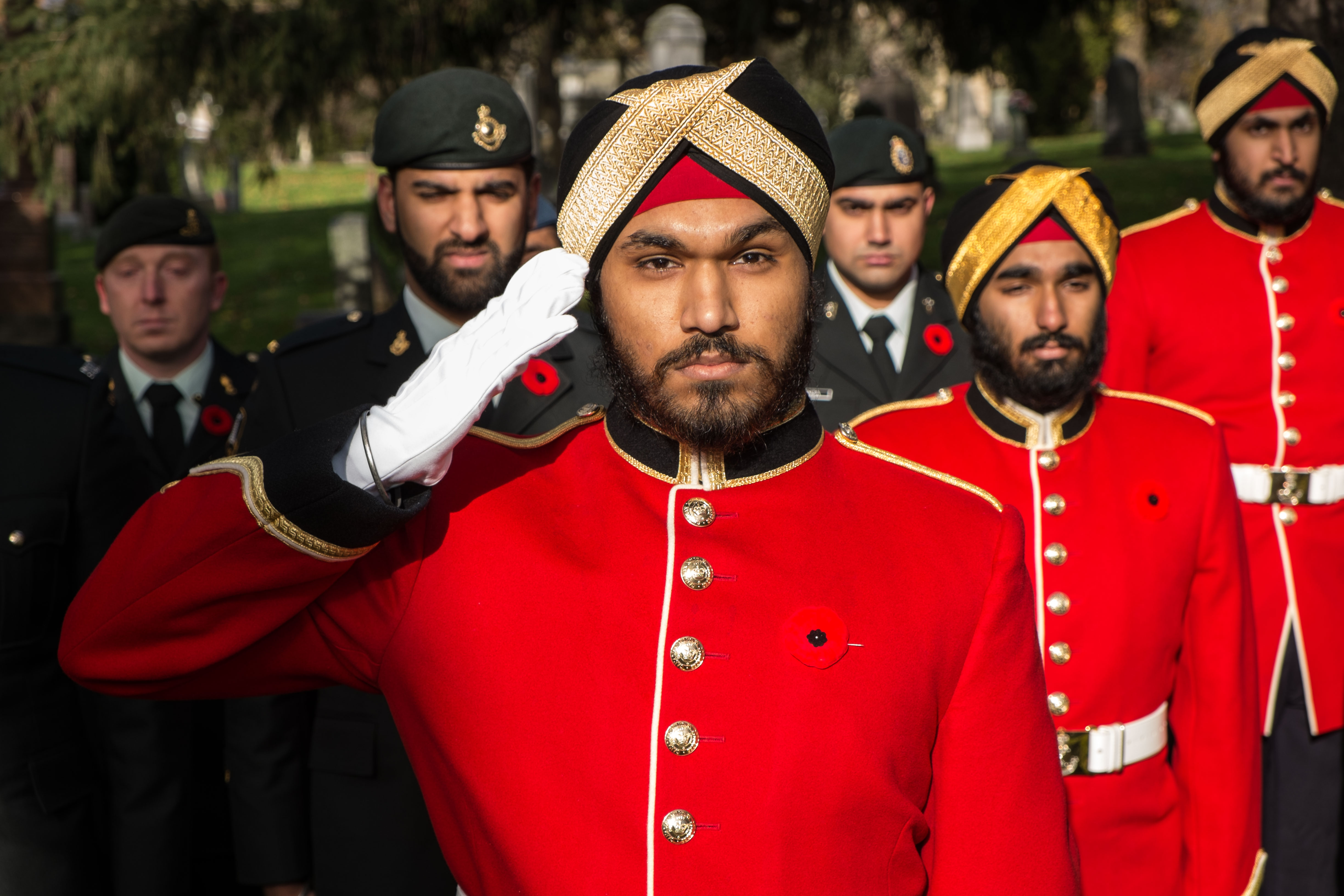
Sikh cadets of the Royal Military College of Canada wearing turbans. Sikh members of the Canadian Forces and the college are permitted to substitute a turban with the same colour as the beret they otherwise would have worn.

Turbans are worn with all orders of dress by Sikh members of the Canadian Armed Forces, although the unit commander retains the right to order for necessary adjustments should a conflict arise with operational safety. Cap badges are worn on the turban. Air Force and Army members are required to use the same colour turban as the colours used by their unit's berets; whereas members of the Navy wear white turbans when peaked caps are worn, and black turbans when berets are worn. Some units also add ribbons based on their regimental colours, worn crossed behind the cap badge and tucked in at the back.

=== Wedge cap ===
The wedge cap is the only headdress authorized for wear with Air Force ceremonial dress. It is also worn with Air Force service dress and flying clothing, but not with CADPAT (the beret is also authorized for wear with these orders of dress).

A rifle green version, referred to as the field service cap, is worn by rifle regiments of the Royal Canadian Infantry Corps.

== Regulations ==
Regulations for the wear of uniforms are contained in the CF publication Canadian Forces Dress Instructions. Amendments to dress regulations are issued through the office of the Vice Chief of the Defence Staff (VCDS), initially in the form of a CANFORGEN (Canadian Forces General) message, which is placed in the dress manual until an official publication amendment can be promulgated.

Dress regulations may also be amplified, interpreted, or amended by the commanders of formations and units (depending on the commander's authority) through the issuing of Standing Orders (SOs), Ship's Standing Orders (SSO), Routine Orders (ROs), and Standard Operating Procedures (SOPs). This may include amplification where the regulations are unclear or are not mandatory; amendments or reversal of some existing regulations for special occasions or events; or the promulgation of regulations regarding the wear of traditional regimental articles (such as kilts).

== See also ==
- Canadian Armed Forces ranks and insignia
- Military uniform
- Uniforms of the Royal Canadian Navy
