= Canadian Armed Forces order of precedence =

All units of the Canadian Armed Forces have an order of precedence that determines seniority; it often decides such matters as which unit forms up to the right (senior side) of other units on a ceremonial parade, or the order in which marches or calls are played at a mess dinner.

== Order of precedence ==
1. Naval Operations Branch
2. Royal Canadian Armoured Corps (see below)
3. Royal Canadian Artillery
4. Canadian Military Engineers
5. Communications and Electronics Branch
6. Royal Canadian Infantry Corps (see below)
7. Air Operations Branch
8. Royal Canadian Logistics Service
9. Royal Canadian Medical Service
10. Royal Canadian Dental Corps
11. Corps of Royal Canadian Electrical and Mechanical Engineers
12. Royal Canadian Chaplain Service
13. Canadian Forces Military Police
14. Legal Branch
15. Music Branch
16. Personnel Selection Branch
17. Training Development Branch
18. Public Affairs Branch
19. Intelligence Branch
20. Cadet Instructors Cadre
21. Special Operations Forces Branch

Note: The honour of "the right of the line" (precedence over other units), on an army parade, is held by the units of the Royal Canadian Horse Artillery (RCHA) when on parade with their guns. On dismounted parades, RCHA units take precedence over all other land force units except formed bodies of officer cadets of the Royal Military College representing their college. Royal Canadian Artillery units parade to the left of units of the Royal Canadian Armoured Corps.

=== Precedence of armoured regiments ===
Regular Force

1. The Royal Canadian Dragoons
2. Lord Strathcona's Horse (Royal Canadians)
3. 12^{e} Régiment blindé du Canada (Regular)

Primary Reserve

1. The Governor General's Horse Guards
2. 8th Canadian Hussars (Princess Louise's)
3. The Halifax Rifles (RCAC)
4. The Ontario Regiment (RCAC)
5. The Queen's York Rangers (1st American Regiment) (RCAC)
6. Sherbrooke Hussars
7. 12^{e} Régiment blindé du Canada (Militia)
8. 1st Hussars
9. The Prince Edward Island Regiment (RCAC)
10. The Royal Canadian Hussars (Montreal)
11. The British Columbia Regiment (Duke of Connaught's Own)
12. The South Alberta Light Horse
13. The Saskatchewan Dragoons
14. The King's Own Calgary Regiment (RCAC)
15. The British Columbia Dragoons
16. The Fort Garry Horse
17. Le Régiment de Hull (RCAC)
18. The Windsor Regiment (RCAC)

==== Supplementary Reserve ====
1. 4th Princess Louise Dragoon Guards
2. 12th Manitoba Dragoons
3. 14th Canadian Hussars

=== Precedence of infantry regiments ===
Regular Force

1. The Royal Canadian Regiment (Regular)
2. Princess Patricia's Canadian Light Infantry (Regular)
3. Royal 22^{e} Régiment (Regular)

Primary Reserve

1. Governor General's Foot Guards
2. The Canadian Grenadier Guards
3. The Queen's Own Rifles of Canada
4. The Black Watch (Royal Highland Regiment) of Canada
5. Les Voltigeurs de Québec
6. The Royal Regiment of Canada
7. The Royal Hamilton Light Infantry (Wentworth Regiment)
8. The Princess of Wales' Own Regiment
9. The Hastings and Prince Edward Regiment
10. The Lincoln and Welland Regiment
11. 4th Battalion, The Royal Canadian Regiment
12. The Royal Highland Fusiliers of Canada
13. The Grey and Simcoe Foresters
14. The Lorne Scots (Peel, Dufferin and Halton Regiment)
15. The Brockville Rifles
16. Stormont, Dundas and Glengarry Highlanders
17. Les Fusiliers du S^{t}-Laurent
18. Le Régiment de la Chaudière
19. Royal 22^{e} Régiment (Militia)
  1. 4th Battalion, Royal 22^{e} Régiment (Châteauguay)
  2. 6th Battalion, Royal 22^{e} Régiment
20. Les Fusiliers Mont-Royal
21. The Princess Louise Fusiliers
22. The Royal New Brunswick Regiment
23. The West Nova Scotia Regiment
24. The North Shore Regiment
25. The Nova Scotia Highlanders
26. Le Régiment de Maisonneuve
27. The Cameron Highlanders of Ottawa (Duke of Edinburgh's Own)
28. The Royal Winnipeg Rifles
29. The Essex and Kent Scottish
30. 48th Highlanders of Canada
31. Le Régiment du Saguenay
32. The Cape Breton Highlanders
33. The Algonquin Regiment (Northern Pioneers)
34. The Argyll and Sutherland Highlanders of Canada (Princess Louise's)
35. The Lake Superior Scottish Regiment
36. The North Saskatchewan Regiment
37. The Royal Regina Rifles
38. The Rocky Mountain Rangers
39. The Loyal Edmonton Regiment (4th Battalion, Princess Patricia's Canadian Light Infantry)
40. The Queen's Own Cameron Highlanders of Canada
41. The Royal Westminster Regiment
42. The Calgary Highlanders (10th Canadians)
43. Les Fusiliers de Sherbrooke
44. The Seaforth Highlanders of Canada
45. The Canadian Scottish Regiment (Princess Mary's)
46. The Royal Montreal Regiment
47. The Irish Regiment of Canada
48. The Toronto Scottish Regiment
49. Royal Newfoundland Regiment

==== Supplementary Reserve ====
1. The Canadian Guards
2. Victoria Rifles of Canada
3. The Royal Rifles of Canada
4. The Perth Regiment
5. Le Régiment de Joliette
6. The Winnipeg Grenadiers
7. The South Saskatchewan Regiment
8. The Yukon Regiment

== See also ==
- Canadian order of precedence
- Canadian order of precedence (decorations and medals)
