= Authorized marches of the Canadian Armed Forces =

Flag of the Canadian Forces

The following is a list of the notable authorized marches for various organisations of the Canadian Armed Forces. The first march listed is the march most commonly performed for that organisation on parade; it is commonly referred to simply as that organisation's "march" or "march past". In addition, many organisations also have additional pieces for slow marches, marches for mounted parades, pipe marches, etc.; they are subsequently listed and footnoted as applicable.

Within each grouping, the organisations are listed in their order of precedence, i.e. the order the organisations would march on parade and the order the marches would be played.

== Military colleges ==
- Royal Military College of Canada - "Precision" composed by Madame Denise Chabot (wife of head of French department); For pipe band: "Alexander Mackenzie" was composed by Pipe Major Don M. Carrigan, who was the College Pipe Major 1973 to 1985
- Royal Military College Saint-Jean - "La marche du Richelieu" composed by Madame Denise Chabot (wife of head of French department); Slow march: La Gaillarde

== Commands ==
- Royal Canadian Navy - "Heart of Oak"
- Canadian Army - "The Great Little Army"
- Royal Canadian Air Force - "RCAF March Past"
- Joint Task Force (North) - "Canada North"

== Formations ==
- Defence Information Services Organisation - "Communications"
- 1st Canadian Division - "Vimy Ridge"
- 2nd Canadian Division - "Carillon"
- 3rd Canadian Division - "Invercargill"
- 1 Canadian Mechanized Brigade Group - "Sons of the Brave"
- 5 Canadian Mechanized Brigade Group - "Allons-y"
- 32 Canadian Brigade Group - "Minstrel Boy"
- 33 Canadian Brigade Group - "Killaloe"
- 34 Canadian Brigade Group - "Aida"
- 35 Canadian Brigade Group - "Le Pays"
- 38 Canadian Brigade Group - "March Past of 38 Brigade"
- 39 Canadian Brigade Group - "Splendor Sine Occasu"
- 41 Canadian Brigade Group - "Alberta Bound"
- Canadian Forces Recruiting, Education and Training System - "Century of Progress"

== Personnel branches ==
- Naval Operations Branch – "Heart of Oak"
- Royal Regiment of Canadian Artillery – "British Grenadiers" (2); "Royal Artillery Slow March" (3); "Keel Row" (4); Royal Canadian Horse Artillery only – "Bonnie Dundee" (5)
- Royal Canadian Armoured Corps – "My Boy Willie"
- Canadian Military Engineers – "Wings"
- Communications and Electronics Branch – "The Mercury March"
  - Royal Canadian Corps of Signals - "Begone Dull Care"
  - Joint Signal Regiment – "Corps March of the Royal Canadian Corps of Signals" ("Begone Dull Care")
- Royal Canadian Infantry Corps – "The Canadian Infantryman"
- Air Operations Branch – "RCAF March Past"
- Royal Canadian Logistics Service – "March of the Logistics Branch"
- Royal Canadian Medical Service – "The Farmer's Boy"
- Royal Canadian Dental Corps – "March Past of the Royal Canadian Dental Corps"; "Greensleeves" (3)
- Corps of Royal Canadian Electrical and Mechanical Engineers – "REME Corps March Past" (Both "Lillibullero" and "Auprès de ma blonde" should be played); "The Craftsman" (3)
- Royal Canadian Chaplain Service – "Ode to Joy"
- Canadian Forces Military Police – "Thunderbird"
- Legal Branch – "Hymn to Freedom"
- Music Branch – "None authorized. Provides music to the Canadian Forces"
- Personnel Selection Branch – "Semper Intellegere" ("Rondo Sentimentale")
- Training Development Branch – "Salut"
- Public Affairs Branch – "Liberty Bell"
- Intelligence Branch – "E Tenebris Lux" (an arrangement of Mozart's Eine Kleine Nachtmusik)
  - Canadian Intelligence Corps - Silver and Green
- Cadet Instructor Cadre – "La Feuille d'érable"

== Armoured regiments ==
- The Royal Canadian Dragoons - "Monsieur Beaucaire" (7); "Light of Foot" (8)
- Lord Strathcona's Horse (Royal Canadians) - "Soldiers of the Queen"
- 12^{e} Régiment blindé du Canada - "Marianne s'en va-t-au moulin"; "Quand vous mourrez de nos amours" (3)
- The Governor General's Horse Guards - "Men of Harlech"; "Keel Row" (4); "Bonnie Dundee" (5)
- 8th Canadian Hussars (Princess Louise's) - "The Galloping 8th Hussars"; "The 8th Hussars" (tune "Road to the Isles") (3)
- The Ontario Regiment (RCAC) - "John Peel"
- The Queen's York Rangers (1st American Regiment) (RCAC) - "Braganza"
- Sherbrooke Hussars - "Regimental March of the Sherbrooke Hussars"
- 12^{e} Régiment blindé du Canada (Milice) - see 12^{e} Régiment blindé du Canada, above
- 1st Hussars - "Bonnie Dundee"
- The Prince Edward Island Regiment (RCAC) - "Old Solomon Levi"
- The Royal Canadian Hussars (Montreal) - "Men of Harlech" and "St. Patrick's Day"
- The British Columbia Regiment (Duke of Connaught's Own) - "I'm Ninety-Five"
- The South Alberta Light Horse - "A Southerly Wind and a Cloudy Sky"
- The Saskatchewan Dragoons - "Punjaub"
- The King's Own Calgary Regiment (RCAC) - "Colonel Bogey"
- The British Columbia Dragoons - "Fare Ye Well Inniskilling (5th Royal Inniskilling Dragoon Guards)"; "Scotland the Brave" (1)
- The Fort Garry Horse - "El Abanico" and "St. Patrick's Day"; "Red River Valley" (3)
- Le Régiment de Hull (RCAC) - "La Marche de la victoire"
- The Windsor Regiment (RCAC) - "My Boy Willie"

== Artillery regiments ==
- 42nd Field Artillery Regiment (Lanark and Renfrew Scottish), RCA - for military band, see Artillery marches; else, "Highland Laddie" (1)
- 49th Field Artillery Regiment, RCA - for military band, see Artillery marches; else, "A Hundred Pipers" (1)

== Infantry regiments ==
- The Royal Canadian Regiment - "The Royal Canadian Regiment" (also published under the title "St. Catharines"); "Pro Patria" (3)
- Princess Patricia's Canadian Light Infantry - Medley of: "Has Anyone Seen the Colonel", "Tipperary" and "Mademoiselle from Armentières"; "Lili Marlene" (3)
- Royal 22^{e} Régiment - "Vive la Canadienne"; "Marche lente du Royal 22^{e} Régiment" (also published under the title "La prière en famille") (3)
- Governor General's Foot Guards - "Milanollo"; "Figaro" (3)
- The Canadian Grenadier Guards - "British Grenadiers"; "Slow march from Scipione" (3)
- The Queen's Own Rifles of Canada - "The Buffs" and "The Maple Leaf Forever"; "Money Musk" (6)
- The Black Watch (Royal Highland Regiment) of Canada - "Highland Laddie"; "The Red Hackle" (3)
- Les Voltigeurs de Québec - "Les Voltigeurs de Québec"
- The Royal Regiment of Canada - "British Grenadiers" followed by "Here's to the Maiden"
- The Royal Hamilton Light Infantry (Wentworth Regiment) - "The Mountain Rose"
- The Princess of Wales' Own Regiment - "The Buffs"
- The Hastings and Prince Edward Regiment - "I'm Ninety-Five"
- The Lincoln and Welland Regiment - "The Lincolnshire Poacher"
- 4th Battalion, The Royal Canadian Regiment - See Royal Canadian Regiment, above
- The Royal Highland Fusiliers of Canada - "Highland Laddie" and "seann triubhas"
- The Grey and Simcoe Foresters - "The 31st Greys"
- The Lorne Scots (Peel, Dufferin and Halton Regiment) - "The Campbells Are Coming" and "John Peel"
- The Brockville Rifles - "Bonnie Dundee"
- The Stormont, Dundas and Glengarry Highlanders - "Bonnie Dundee"
- Les Fusiliers du S^{t}-Laurent - "Rêves Canadiens"
- Le Régiment de la Chaudière - "Le Régiment de Sambre et Meuse" and "The Longest Day"
- 4^{e} Bataillon, Royal 22^{e} Régiment (Châteauguay) - See Royal 22^{e} Régiment, above
- 6^{e} Bataillon, Royal 22^{e} Régiment - See Royal 22^{e} Régiment, above
- Les Fusiliers Mont-Royal - "The Jockey of York"
- The Princess Louise Fusiliers - "British Grenadiers"
- The Royal New Brunswick Regiment - "A Hundred Pipers" followed by "The Old North Shore"
- The West Nova Scotia Regiment - "God Bless the Prince of Wales"; "The Garb of Old Gaul" (3)
- The Nova Scotia Highlanders - "The Sweet Maid of Glendaruel"; 1st Battalion: "The Atholl Highlanders" and "The Piobaireachd of Donald Dhu"
- Le Régiment de Maisonneuve - "Le Régiment de Sambre et Meuse"
- The Cameron Highlanders of Ottawa (Duke of Edinburgh's Own) - "The Piobaireachd of Donald Dhu" and "March of the Cameron Men"
- The Royal Winnipeg Rifles - "Old Solomon Levi" ("Pork, Beans and Hard Tack"); "Keel Row" (6)
- The Essex and Kent Scottish - "Highland Laddie" and "A Hundred Pipers"
- 48th Highlanders of Canada - "Highland Laddie"
- Le Régiment du Saguenay - "Le Régiment du Saguenay"
- Cape Breton Highlanders - "Highland Laddie"
- The Algonquin Regiment (Northern Pioneers) - "We Lead, Others Follow"
- The Argyll and Sutherland Highlanders of Canada (Princess Louise's) - "The Campbells Are Coming"
- The Lake Superior Scottish Regiment - "Highland Laddie"
- North Saskatchewan Regiment - "The Jockey of York"; "The Meeting of Waters" (1)
- The Royal Regina Rifles - "Lutzow's Wild Hunt"; "Keel Row" (6)
- The Rocky Mountain Rangers - "The Meeting of the Waters (march)"
- The Loyal Edmonton Regiment (4th Battalion, Princess Patricia's Canadian Light Infantry) - "Bonnie Dundee"
- The Queen's Own Cameron Highlanders of Canada - "The Piobaireachd of Donald Dhu" and "March of the Cameron Men"
- The Royal Westminster Regiment - "The Maple Leaf Forever'
- The Calgary Highlanders (10th Canadians) - "Highland Laddie" and "Blue Bonnets Over the Border"
- Les Fusiliers de Sherbrooke - "Queen City"
- The Seaforth Highlanders of Canada - "The Piobaireachd of Donald Dhu"
- The Canadian Scottish Regiment (Princess Mary's) - "Blue Bonnets Over the Border"
- The Royal Montreal Regiment - "Ça ira"
- The Irish Regiment of Canada - "Garryowen"
- The Toronto Scottish Regiment - "Blue Bonnets Over the Border"
- Royal Newfoundland Regiment - "The Banks of Newfoundland"
- Canadian Rangers - "Vigilans"

== Miscellaneous organisations ==
Note: These organisations are NOT in order of precedence.

- Canadian Forces Base Montreal - "Servir"
- Canadian Army Advanced Warfare Centre - "The Longest Day"
- Royal Canadian Sea Cadets - "Heart of Oak"
- Royal Canadian Army Cadets - "Cadet", "Scotland the Brave" or the authorised march of the affiliated CF unit
- Royal Canadian Air Cadets - "RCAF March Past"
- The Canadian Forces Logistics Training Centre - "Anytime, Anywhere". This march was written by Michael Lett of the Central Band of the Canadian Armed Forces and officially recognized by the Directorate of History and Heritage on 17 February 2021. The title was one of several proposed titles and voted on by the staff at CFLTC at a mess dinner.

== Former organisations ==
- Royal Roads Military College - "Hatley Park"; Slow march "Going Home"
- The Canadian Guards - Quick march: "The Standard of St. George," slow march: "From Sea To Sea."
- The Royal Canadian Ordnance Corps - "The Village Blacksmith"
- The Royal Canadian Army Service Corps - "Wait for the Wagon"
- The Canadian Airborne Regiment - "The Longest Day" or originally "Canada (song)" which was called Canadian Airborne

== Other marches ==
=== "The 10 Provinces March" ===
"The 10 Provinces March" is an arrangement of folk tunes composed by Howard Cable (1920–2016). It was first composed in 1986 as a result of a special commission by the government. The march is performed every day during the Changing of the Guard Ceremony on Parliament Hill in Ottawa. It is heard immediately as the new guard and the Band of the Ceremonial Guard arrives on the hill at exactly 10 a.m. The piece includes the melodies of 10 provincial songs:

- Newfoundland: "The Ryans and the Pittmans"
- Prince Edward Island: "Anne of Green Gables"
- Nova Scotia: "Farewell to Nova Scotia"
- New Brunswick: "Peter Emberley"
- Quebec: "Bonhomme, Bonhomme / Cadet Rousselle"
- Ontario: "Maple Leaf Forever"
- Manitoba: "Red River Valley"
- Saskatchewan: "Saskatchewan Hymn"
- Alberta: "Alberta Bound"
- British Columbia: "Way Up the Ucletaw"

=== "Vimy Ridge" ===
"Vimy Ridge" is a military march of British origin written by Thomas Bidgood in 1921. It commemorates the 1917 Battle of Vimy Ridge during the First World War. The march is usually played on special occasions which commemorate the battle, such as Vimy Ridge Day. Vimy Ridge serves as the official regimental marchpast for the 1st Canadian Division.

The march was used by the Massed Bands of the British Household Division as the second neutral quick march during the Trooping the Colour ceremony in 2014. It also served as the quick march of the Ceremonial Guard before the playing of "Milanollo" during the visit of Queen Elizabeth II to Ottawa during Canada Day in 2010.

=== "Canada Overseas" ===
"Canada Overseas" by James Gayfer is a march written in 1954 which honours Canada's Western European presence since the Second World War. It also alludes to the country's contribution to the founding and development of the North Atlantic Treaty Organization (NATO).

== See also ==
- March (music)
- Canadian patriotic music
- Canadian Armed Forces

== Notes ==
(1) - For pipe band
(2) - Slow march
(3) - Quick march for dismounted parades
(4) - Trot-past for mounted parades
(5) - Gallop-past for mounted parades
(6) - Double-past
(7) - Concerts, mess dinners, and mounted parades
(8) - Dismounted parades
