= Unification of the Canadian Armed Forces =

1968 merger of the Canadian Armed Forces

Badge of the Canadian Armed Forces

The unification of the Canadian Armed Forces took place on 1 February 1968, when the Royal Canadian Navy, Canadian Army, and Royal Canadian Air Force were merged to form the Canadian Armed Forces.

== History ==
A white paper was tabled in the Parliament of Canada on 26 March 1964 by the Minister of National Defence, Paul Hellyer, and the Associate Minister of National Defence, Lucien Cardin. This document outlined a major restructuring of the three separate armed services, describing a reorganization that would include the integration of operations, logistics support, personnel, and administration of the separate branches, under a functional command system. The proposal met with strong opposition from personnel in all three services, and resulted in the dismissal of the navy's senior operational commander, Rear Admiral William Landymore, as well as the forced retirements of other senior officers in the nation's military forces. The protests of service personnel and their superiors had no effect, however, and on 1 February 1968, Bill C-243, The Canadian Forces Reorganization Act, was granted royal assent, and the Royal Canadian Navy, the Canadian Army, and the Royal Canadian Air Force were combined into one service: the Canadian Armed Forces.

The public explanation for the reorganization was that unification would achieve cost savings and provide improved command, control, and integration of the military forces. Hellyer stated on 4 November 1966 that "the amalgamation... will provide the flexibility to enable Canada to meet in the most effective manner the military requirements of the future. It will also establish Canada as an unquestionable leader in the field of military organization." However, the serving Liberal ministers of the Crown were accused of not caring for the traditions behind each individual service, especially as the long-standing navy, army, and air force identities were replaced with common army-style ranks and rifle green uniforms. Rather than loyalty to each service, which, as military historian Jack Granatstein put it, was "vital for sailors, soldiers, and airmen and women" who "risk their lives to serve," Hellyer wanted loyalty to the new, all-encompassing Canadian Armed Forces (CAF); this, it was said, caused damage to the esprit de corps for sailors, soldiers, air crew, and other personnel.

As part of unification, the Royal Canadian Navy, the Canadian Army, and the Royal Canadian Air Force were merged, and lost their status as separate legal entities. Most of the commands of the former services were eliminated, and new unified commands were created. Army personnel and equipment were placed under an entity known as Mobile Command (later renamed Land Force Command). Navy personnel and ships were placed under Maritime Command. Personnel and aircraft of the former Royal Canadian Air Force were divided between Mobile Command, Maritime Command, Air Defence Command, Air Transport Command, and Training Command. In 1975, all aircraft of the Canadian Armed Forces were placed under a new command known as Air Command.

Most of the pre-unification corps that had been created in the early 20th century were disbanded or were merged with counterparts in the navy and air force to form the personnel branches of the CF.

- The Canadian Forces Medical Service (which had been formed as a joint professional organization in 1959 by the functional integration of the Royal Canadian Army Medical Corps, RCN medical branch and RCAF medical branch) became a personnel branch of the new Canadian Forces in 1969, as did the Canadian Forces Dental Service; in the 1990s, both the CFMS and CFDS would combine together administratively as the Canadian Forces Health Services (remaining distinct personnel branches within the greater CFHS). In October 2013, the Medical Branch was renamed the Royal Canadian Medical Service, and the Dental Branch was restored to its previous name of Royal Canadian Dental Corps.
- Royal Canadian Engineers – became the Canadian Military Engineer Branch, encompassing the five functions of engineering across the three former services: combat engineers from the Army, airfield engineers and firefighters from the RCAF, construction engineers from all three services, and mappers and surveyors from Army Survey Establishment.
- Royal Canadian Corps of Signals — became the Communications and Electronics Branch
- Royal Canadian Ordnance Corps amalgamated with supply and transport services of Royal Canadian Army Service Corps; became the Logistics Branch
- Royal Canadian Electrical and Mechanical Engineers — became Land Ordnance Engineering, then Electrical and Mechanical Engineering Branch
- Clerical trades of Royal Canadian Army Service Corps, Royal Canadian Army Pay Corps, and Royal Canadian Postal Corps — became the Administration Branch (later merged with the Logistics Branch)
- Canadian Provost Corps and Canadian Intelligence Corps — became the Security Branch

The move toward unification, as well as other budget and cost-cutting moves during the 1980s and 1990s, were opposed by many and is sometimes seen as a fault in the Canadian Forces. Many veterans objected to unification, and sometimes referred to branches of the military by their pre-unification titles. In 2013 the traditional designation of 'Royal' was restored to several of the branches listed above.

== Further changes ==
Over the ensuing decades, many of the elements of unification were incrementally reversed. The Communication Command was established on 1 September 1970. Air Defence Command and Air Transport Command disbanded, and their assets transferred to a new Air Command on 2 September 1975. This effectively restored a unified air force within the Canadian Armed Forces.

The government of Brian Mulroney (1984 to 1993) took steps which restored more traditional and distinct army, navy, and air force uniforms to the Canadian Armed Forces, though the unified structure of the Armed Forces was maintained.

Materiel Command was disbanded during the 1980s, and Communications Command was disbanded during a mid-1990s reorganization, with its units merged into the Defence Information Services Organization (DISO), later renamed Information Management Group (IM Gp). Mobile Command was also renamed at this time, becoming Land Force Command (LFC). On 1 February 2006, the CF added four operational commands to the existing structure: Canada Command (CANCOM), Canadian Expeditionary Force Command (CEFCOM), Canadian Special Operations Forces Command (CANSOFCOM), and Canadian Operational Support Command (CANOSCOM). In 2012, CANCOM, CEFCOM, and CANOSCOM were merged into Canadian Joint Operations Command.

== Name restorations ==
On 16 August 2011, the three environmental commands of the Canadian Armed Forces were renamed to reflect the names of the original historical armed services. Air Command was changed to the Royal Canadian Air Force; Maritime Command was changed to the Royal Canadian Navy; and Land Force Command was changed to the Canadian Army. The government made the changes to align Canada with other key Commonwealth countries whose militaries use the royal designation, and to indicate that it respected Canada's military heritage.

The unified command structure of the Canadian Armed Forces was not altered by this change. Unlike the situation prior to 1968, where the services existed as separate legal entities, the current Royal Canadian Navy, Canadian Army, and Royal Canadian Air Force have no separate legal status and, under terms of amendments made to the National Defence Act in 2014, exist as commands within the unified Canadian Armed Forces.

Officers' insignia was also changed during this period of name restorations, to match the distinctive insignia worn by the three branches of the pre-unification era. The navy added the executive curl to their gold bars and reintroduced naval sleeve insignia for flag officers. The army abandoned the CF-style bars for pre-unification pips and crowns insignia, substituting the Canadian 'Vimy Star' for the previous Star of the Order of the Bath, an insignia borrowed from the British order of chivalry. The air force changed their gold bar insignia to a composite braid in pearl grey, similar to patterns worn before unification.

== See also ==
- Canadian military bands — a sphere that was affected by the reorganization
- Ceremonial Guard — a unit with a pan-CF organization that was advocated in unification
