= RCLS =

RCLS can mean:

- Radio Controlled Lighting System (Pilot Controlled Lighting)
- Reactor Control and Limitation System
- Royal Canadian Logistics Service
- Runway Centerline Light System, see Runway#Technical specifications
