= Music Branch (Canadian Forces) =

Unified music branch of the Canadian Armed Forces

- Branche de la musique
- Active: 1968–Present
- Country: Canada
- Branch: Canadian Forces
- Type: CF Personnel Branch
- Part of: Directorate of History and Heritage
- Headquarters: National Defence Headquarters, Ottawa
- March: Canada on the March
- Website: "Canadian Forces Music". 11 January 2018.

Commanders
- Supervisor of Music: Lieutenant Colonel John Fullerton
- Music Branch CWO: Chief Petty Officer 1st Class Chris Webster
- Notable commanders: Lieutenant Colonel Stephen Murray; Major Patrick Picard

The Music Branch is a personnel branch of the Canadian Armed Forces (CAF). It is primarily composed of band musicians, and also deals with the selection and musical training of its recruits. The branch encompasses all the military bands in service in the Canadian Armed Forces. It is roughly the equivalent to the British Army's Royal Corps of Army Music (CAMUS).

The musicians play in brass/reed and pipes & drums bands. Canadian military bands consist of:

- 6 full-time regular force bands
- 53 part-time reserve force bands
- 15 voluntary bands

The members of these bands come from all over the CF, coming from units in the Canadian Army, Royal Canadian Air Force, and Royal Canadian Navy. The branch controls all RCN and RCAF bands through the Naval Operations Branch and the Air Operations Branch respectively. The music branch as a whole is responsible for fostering morale in the CF and providing musical support for all aspects of military life and for official military ceremonies, including guards of honour for dignitaries.

== Directorate of History and Heritage ==
The Directorate of History and Heritage is a sub-department of the Department of National Defence that is responsible to the Chief of Military Personnel (CMP) for providing personnel and technical advice regarding the Music Branch. It was founded on 1 September 1996 by merging the Canadian Forces Music Centre and the Directorate of Military Traditions and Heritage. On 1 April of the following year, the Music Centre was made part of the Directorate. The directorate has 7 sections, with the musical section making up DHH 7.

Its specific roles include:

- Developing and managing Music Branch policy
- Evaluating musician qualification level
- Provide advice and guidance on human resources including recommending the relocation of personnel and the recruitment for the Music Branch
- Recommending the authorization of official music, marches and calls

The DHH Music Staff is the official leadership of the DHH and the Music Branch that formulates Music Branch policy and carries out its roles. The order of precedence is as follows:

- Supervisor of Music
- Music Branch Chief Warrant Officer
- Music Branch Chief of Staff
- CF Music Branch Standards Advisor
- Pipes and Drums Advisor and Standards Master Warrant Officer
- Brass and Reed Standards Master Warrant Officer
- Music Branch Auditions Coordinator

== Military Tattoos ==
The Music Branch handles all CF Military Tattoos around the country, including the Royal Nova Scotia International Tattoo, the Fortissimo Sunset Ceremony and the Canadian International Military Tattoo. The first tattoo to be managed by the branch was the Canadian Armed Forces Tattoo in 1967, which was the world's largest travelling show.

== Traditions ==
=== March ===
The Music Branch has no authorized marches as it is responsible for providing music to the Canadian Forces.

== Music Division ==
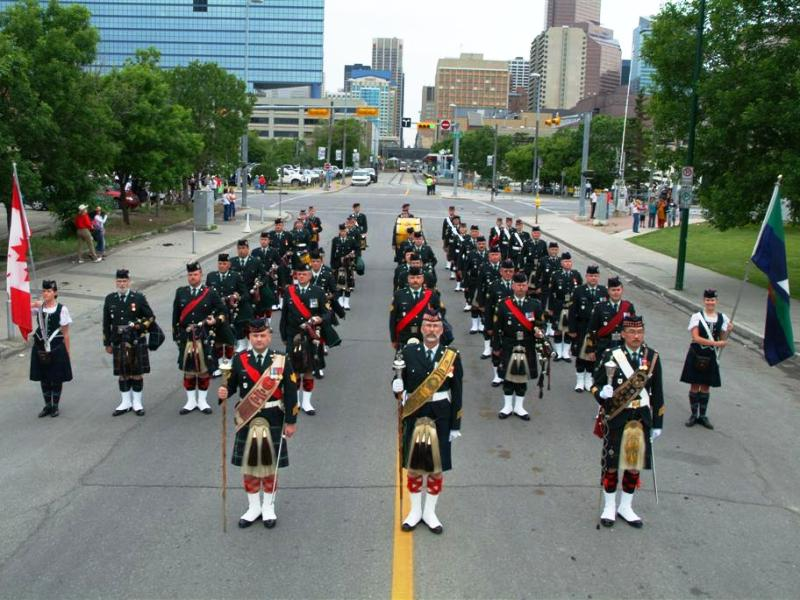
The Regimental Pipes and Drums of The Calgary Highlanders is one of many voluntary pipe and drum bands administered by the Music Branch of the CF.

The Canadian Forces Logistics Training Centre Music Division is the training institution of the Music Branch that offers a curriculum of instruction to potential musicians in the CF. Part of the Royal Canadian Logistics Service, it is the de facto successor to the Canadian Forces School of Music. It is located in Building E-51 at CFB Borden. It consists of a concert hall, 47 practice studios, 10 teaching studios, a library, and four classrooms.

== Supervisors of Music ==
- Clifford Hunt (1964-1968)
- Charles Villeneuve (1980-1984)
- Commander George Morrison (1984-1990)
- Lieutenant Colonel Gaétan Bouchard
- Lieutenant Colonel W. Scott Attridge
- Lieutenant Colonel Charles Gaudreau (2019–2022)
- Commander Patrice Arsenault (2022–2024)
- Lieutenant Colonel John Fullerton (2024-Present)

== See also ==
- Canadian military bands
- Personnel branch
- Authorized marches of the Canadian Armed Forces
- Navy bands in Canada
- List of Royal Canadian Air Force Bands

== Order of precedence ==
Preceded by Legal Branch	Music Branch	Succeeded by Personnel Selection Branch
