= William Henry Atkinson =

Canadian military aviator (1923–2015)

William Henry Isaac Atkinson DSC, CD
- William Henry Atkinson
- Born: 22 April 1923; Minnedosa, Manitoba, Canada
- Died: 18 July 2015 (aged 92); White Rock, British Columbia
- Military career
- Allegiance: Canada
- Branch: Royal Canadian Navy
- Service years: 1943–1973
- Rank: Commander
- Nicknames: Bill, Wild Bill
- Unit: Fleet Air Arm
- Commands: HMCS Haida; HMCS Venture
- Conflicts: Second World War: Operation Meridian; Battle of Okinawa
- Awards: Distinguished Service Cross; Mentioned in Despatches; Canadian Forces' Decoration

William Henry Isaac Atkinson DSC, CD (22 April 1923 – 18 July 2015) was the highest scoring fighter ace of the Royal Canadian Navy during the Second World War and the last pilot from The Commonwealth to become an ace during the war. Atkinson claimed six aircraft destroyed and two shared. During the war he was awarded the Distinguished Service Cross and was Mentioned in Despatches. Remaining in the navy after the war he was awarded the Canadian Forces Decoration and clasp.

After the war he remained in the Royal Canadian Navy and was eventually promoted to Commander and given command of the destroyer HMCS Haida and the officers training school HMCS Venture before retiring.

== Career ==
William Henry Isaac Atkinson was born on 22 April 1923, and raised at Minnedosa in Manitoba, later moving to Winnipeg. In January 1943, during the Second World War, the 19-year-old Atkinson volunteered to be an aviator with the Royal Canadian Naval Volunteer Reserve (RCNVR).

Atkinson was sent to the United Kingdom for his basic flying training at HMS St. Vincent at Gosport. He was sent back to Canada to undertake further flying training at RCAF Goderich and RCAF Station Aylmer. He was promoted to petty officer in March 1944 and qualified as a pilot and received his 'wings' in April and was commissioned acting sub-lieutenant. Atkinson was then sent back to the United Kingdom, posted to 761 Naval Air Squadron at the Royal Naval College, Greenwich. Promoted sub-lieutenant on 1 October 1944, he was posted to HMS Ravager for deck landing training with the Supermarine Seafire. Advanced flying training was carried out on the Grumman Hellcat at RNAS Puttalam in Ceylon.

=== HMS Indomitable ===
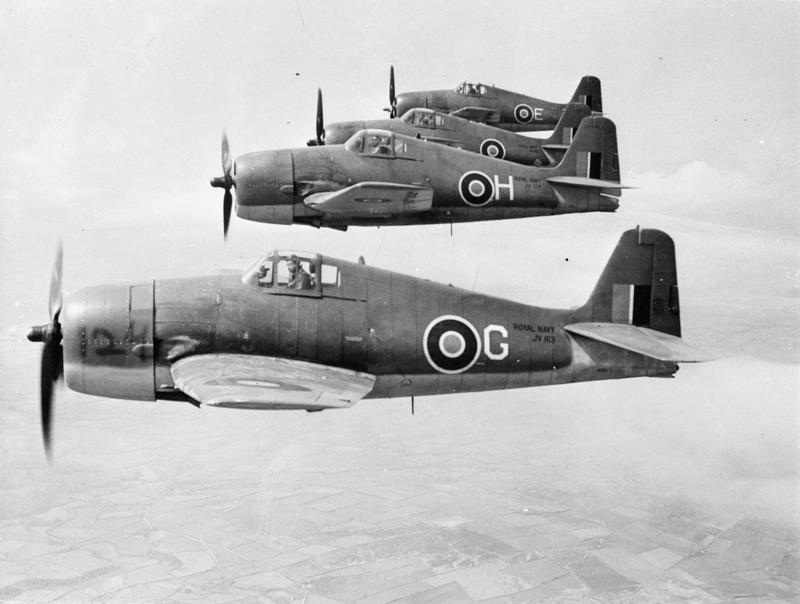
Grumman Hellcats in Royal Navy service

Having completed his flying training, Atkinson was posted to the Grumman-Hellcat-equipped 1844 Naval Air Squadron aboard the fleet carrier HMS Indomitable, part of the British Pacific Fleet in December 1944. In January 1945, Atkinson's ship was part of the force gathered for Operation Meridian, air strikes on the Japanese held oil installations at Palembang on Sumatra. Their objectives were at Songei Gerong, which had been the East Indies refinery for the Standard Oil Company. The other was at Pladjoe, the former Royal Dutch Shell refinery. Together these plants produced 50 percent of Japan's oil and 75 percent of their aviation fuel. Atkinson took part in the operations on 24 and 29 January.

In April 1945 Atkinson also took part in Operation Iceberg in support of the American assault on Okinawa. The British Pacific Fleet had objectives on the Sakishima Islands and Formosa. During the first raid on Miyako airfield, Atkinson claimed his first victory over a Mitsubishi G4M Betty bomber, but he was only awarded a probable. He was more successful on 6 April, shooting down a Yokosuka D4Y Judy dive-bomber. He followed this up with a confirmed Mitsubishi A6M Zero fighter and a probable Kawasaki Ki-61 Tony fighter shot down on 12 April. His third confirmed victory was over another Betty bomber on 13 April and he shared in the destruction of a Nakajima C6N carrier-based reconnaissance aircraft on 15 April. His total for April was three confirmed, two probables and one shared.

In a follow-up attack on the Sakishima Islands on 21 May, Atkinson's Hellcat was badly damaged by flak. In June Indomitable was withdrawn for a refit, and Atkinson and his squadron were transferred to another fleet carrier, HMS Formidable. On 25 July, while still aboard Formidable, Atkinson and three other pilots were on a night patrol. Two of the aircraft were forced to return to Formidable with mechanical problems. Atkinson and the other pilot, Sub-Lieutenant Mckie, were directed towards a radar contact. The contact was a flight of Aichi B7A Grace torpedo bombers. Atkinson shot down three of them while Mckie got the fourth. Atkinson's success led to his being mentioned in despatches and awarded a Distinguished Service Cross "For gallant services in the Pacific. For gallantry, skill and marked devotion to duty in the Far East."

=== Later career ===
After the Second World War Atkinson transferred from the RCNVR to the Royal Canadian Navy (RCN). He became a squadron leader with the RCN, his unit being equipped with the McDonnell F2H Banshee. In 1958 he became the executive officer on the destroyer HMCS Nootka. Promoted to commander in 1962, he was given command of the destroyer HMCS Haida from July 1962 to September 1963. He then commanded the Officer Training School HMCS Venture before retiring from the RCN on 1 September 1973. He subsequently moved to Peachland. Atkinson died in July 2015 at the age of 92.

== Bibliography ==
- Thomas, Andrew (27 March 2007). Royal Navy Aces of World War 2. London: Osprey. ISBN 978-1-84603-178-6.
