= Personnel branch =

Groupings of related military occupations in the Canadian Armed Forces

Flag of the Canadian Forces.

Personnel branches, in the Canadian Armed Forces (CAF), are groupings of related military occupations. Personnel branches were officially established at unification in 1968 to amalgamate the old Canadian Army corps and similar occupational groupings in the Royal Canadian Navy and Royal Canadian Air Force.

According to Canadian Forces Administrative Orders (CFAOs),

"Personnel Branches were created to enable members of the Canadian Forces in related occupations to identify with each other in cohesive professional groups. These groups are based on similarity of military roles, customs and traditions." –CFAO 2-10

Branches are applicable to all members of the rank of colonel/captain (N) and below; flag and general officers normally do not belong to branches. Exceptions to this rule are the judge advocate general (Legal Branch), the chaplain general (Royal Canadian Chaplain Service), and the surgeon general (Royal Canadian Medical Service).

Military occupations for officers and non-commissioned members are grouped within a particular branch under the coordination of the Director Military Human Resource Requirements (DMHRR) and the approval of the Chief of Military Personnel.

== Uniforms ==
Assignment of distinctive environmental uniform (i.e. "navy", "army", "air force" or "special operations") is a function of military occupation, not personnel branch. For example, within the Communications and Electronics Branch, all signal operators are uniformed army and all aerospace telecommunication and information systems technicians are designated as air force. On the other hand, within the Royal Canadian Logistics Service, supply technicians may be designated as any environment.

== Branch advisors ==
Each branch has its own branch advisor — normally a colonel or naval captain — to the Chief of the Defence Staff.

== Branch traditions ==
Branches have carried forward many of the traditions inherited from their corps or service predecessors. They have authorized marches, differences in accessories and accoutrements for full dress and mess dress uniforms, branch-specific toasts, ceremonial commanders such as colonels-in-chief, etc. For example:

- The Armoured Branch retained the black beret and resurrected the name of the former Royal Canadian Armoured Corps.
- Army signals officers of the Communications and Electronics Branch are permitted to wear box spurs with mess dress, a tradition inherited from the Royal Canadian Corps of Signals.
- The Air Operations Branch uses "RCAF March Past" as its authorized march.
- The Naval Operations Branch inherited its cap badge system from the old Royal Canadian Navy: one badge for officers and chief petty officers first class, one for chief petty officers second class and petty officers, and another for master sailors and below.

== List of personnel branches ==
The following is a list of CF personnel branches in order of precedence:

- Naval Operations Branch
- Royal Canadian Armoured Corps
- Royal Regiment of Canadian Artillery
- Canadian Military Engineers
- Communications and Electronics Branch
- Royal Canadian Infantry Corps
- Air Operations Branch
- Royal Canadian Logistics Service
- Royal Canadian Medical Service
- Royal Canadian Dental Corps
- Corps of Royal Canadian Electrical and Mechanical Engineers
- Royal Canadian Chaplain Service
- Canadian Forces Military Police
- Legal Branch
- Music Branch
- Personnel Selection Branch
- Training Development Branch
- Public Affairs Branch
- Intelligence Branch
- Cadet Instructors Cadre
- Special Operations Forces Branch
