= Canadian Special Operations Forces Command =

Command of the Canadian defence body

- Commandement des Forces d'opérations spéciales du Canada
- Badge of CANSOFCOM
- Active: 2006–present
- Country: Canada
- Branch: Canadian Armed Forces
- Type: Special operations force
- Role: Direct action; Counter-terrorism
- Size: ≈2,500
- Nickname: Silent Professionals
- Motto: Viam inveniemus (Latin for 'We will find a way')
- Engagements: War in Afghanistan; War in Iraq (2013–2017); Battle of Mosul
- Website: canada.ca/en/special-operations-forces-command.html

Commanders
- Commander CANSOFCOM: MGen Steven Hunter
- Command Chief Warrant Officer: Chief Warrant Officer Jason Yeremiy

Insignia
- Headdress: Tan beret
- Flag

Canadian Special Operations Forces Command (CANSOFCOM; French: Commandement des Forces d'opérations spéciales du Canada; COMFOSCAN) is a command of the Canadian Armed Forces. It is responsible for all special forces operations that respond to terrorism and threats to Canadians and Canadian interests around the world.

CANSOFCOM's primary mission is counter-terrorism, which involves conducting rigorous and specialized training and working with local law enforcement agencies, as required, to protect Canadians from the threat of terrorism.

Commander CANSOFCOM reports directly to the Chief of the Defence Staff. The leadership of the CAF and the Department of National Defence maintain full oversight on all CANSOFCOM operations.

== Operational tasks ==
CANSOFCOM has five strategic tasks:

- Provide advice on special operations to the chief of the defence staff (CDS) and other CAF operational commanders
- Generate deployable, high-readiness special operations forces (SOF) capable of deploying as part of a broader CAF operation, or independently
- Conduct and command SOF operations on behalf of the CDS
- Continuously develop SOF capabilities and tactics
- Maintain and promote relationships with Canadian security partners and allied special operations forces

In support of these strategic tasks, CANSOFCOM personnel are organized, trained, equipped, and always ready to conduct operational tasks.

These tasks include:

- Hostage rescue
- Direct action
- Chemical, biological, radiological and nuclear (CBRN) crisis response
- Sensitive site exploitation
- Combatting weapons of mass destruction
- Maritime special operations
- Support to non-combatant evacuation operations
- Special protection operations
- Defence, diplomacy and military assistance

== Composition ==
CANSOFCOM is organized into a headquarters element and five units. While there is some overlap in missions, all units have primary mandates. These are:

- Joint Task Force 2 (JTF 2) – hostage rescue and counterterrorism
- Canadian Special Operations Regiment (CSOR) – direct action and foreign training/advisory role
- Canadian Joint Incident Response Unit (CJIRU) – nuclear, biological and chemical response
- 427 Special Operations Aviation Squadron (SOAS) – aviation support
- Canadian Special Operations Training Centre (CSOTC).

== Special operations task forces ==
CANSOFCOM employs an integrated operating concept that combines the capabilities of all units in a special operations task force (SOTF) capable of completing assigned missions and tasks. Therefore, depending on the tasks at hand, various combinations of personnel from JTF2, CSOR, 427 SOAS and CJIRU are assembled into a SOTF, as appropriate, to accomplish assigned missions.

The commander selects which task force or team will be deployed based on several criteria, including:

- The scope of the problem;
- The required response time;
- What effect needs to be achieved; and
- The level of precision required.

Based on the requirement to respond to specific standing tasks assigned to the CAF by the Government of Canada, such as responding to a terrorist attack, an international crisis or a CBRN threat, CANSOFCOM has developed several standing SOTFs:

- Immediate Response Task Force (IRTF). The IRTF is the highest-readiness task force available to the Government of Canada; it is deployed on extremely short notice to address issues that could affect national interests. It is composed of personnel from all CANSOFCOM units and is led by JTF2. Its primary focus is counter-terrorism operations, domestic or international.
  - Tasks include hostage rescue, direct action, CBRN response, sensitive-site exploitation, counter-proliferation, and maritime special operations.
- Chemical, Biological, Radiological and Nuclear (CBRN) Task Force. This task force is based on the personnel and capabilities of CJIRU and includes the CANSOFCOM contribution to Canada's National CBRNE Response Team, led by the RCMP. The CBRN Task Force provides a short-notice response to crisis or major events within Canada and is primarily focused on counter-terrorism that involves chemical, biological, radiological or nuclear elements. It provides technical response to CBRN incidents and can be enabled by the capabilities of other CANSOFCOM units as required. At the request of the Government of Canada, the CBRN Task Force can also conduct counter-proliferation operations and be deployed internationally.
  - Tasks include reconnaissance, surveillance, sampling, limited decontamination for task force personnel and sensitive-site exploitation.
- Task Force Arrowhead. TF Arrowhead is a scalable, agile force able to respond to threats and incidents around the globe on short notice. While it is internationally focused, it can also be deployed in Canada. It is a high-readiness SOTF capable of quickly deploying to a crisis for short periods of time. It is composed of personnel from all four units in the command and is led by CSOR. TF Arrowhead represents an initial response that could be a precursor to the deployment of another SOTF or conventional task force.
  - Tasks include direct action, CBRN response, sensitive-site exploitation, counter-proliferation and support to non-combatant evacuation operations, special protection operations.
- SOF teams. Small teams of CANSOFCOM personnel perform tasks that fall outside the scope of the three standing task forces. SOF teams generally deploy for short periods, typically not longer than six months. SOF teams are made up of personnel and capabilities from all four units.
  - Tasks include defence, diplomacy and military assistance, strategic advice, planning and liaison, strategic reconnaissance and security support to operations of other Government of Canada organizations.

The IRTF, CBRN Task Force, Task Force Arrowhead and the SOF teams do not represent the full extent of CANSOFCOM capabilities; CANSOFCOM is capable of generating additional forces for specific needs as required.

== Commanding officers ==
| Name | Dates |
|---|---|
| Colonel David Barr | 2005–2007 |
| Major-General D. Michael Day | 2007–2011 |
| Brigadier-General D.W. Thompson | 2011–2013 |
| Major-General Michael Rouleau | 2014–2018 |
| Major-General Peter Dawe | 2018–2021 |
| Major-General Steve Boivin | 2021–2024 |
| Major-General Steven Hunter | 2024 – present |

== Uniform ==
With operational uniforms, all members of CANSOFCOM wear the tan beret, regardless of their environment (Navy, Army or Air Force), with the badge of their personnel branch or, in the case of the Royal Canadian Armoured Corps and Royal Canadian Infantry Corps members, the badge of their former regiment.

In 2017 the Special Operations Forces Branch began to wear service dress uniforms that are distinct from the Navy, Army and Air Force. The uniform consists of a dark olive five-button jacket, light olive trousers bloused over black jump boots, light khaki shirt and olive tie, and a tan beret.

== See also ==
- Canadian Joint Operations Command (CJOC) – Canadian brother unit
- United States Special Operations Command (USSOCOM) – American equivalent command
- United Kingdom Special Forces (UKSF) – British equivalent command
- Special Operations Command (Australia) (SOCOMD) – Australian equivalent command
- Kommando Spezialkräfte (KSK) – German equivalent command
