= Tan beret =

Military Headdress

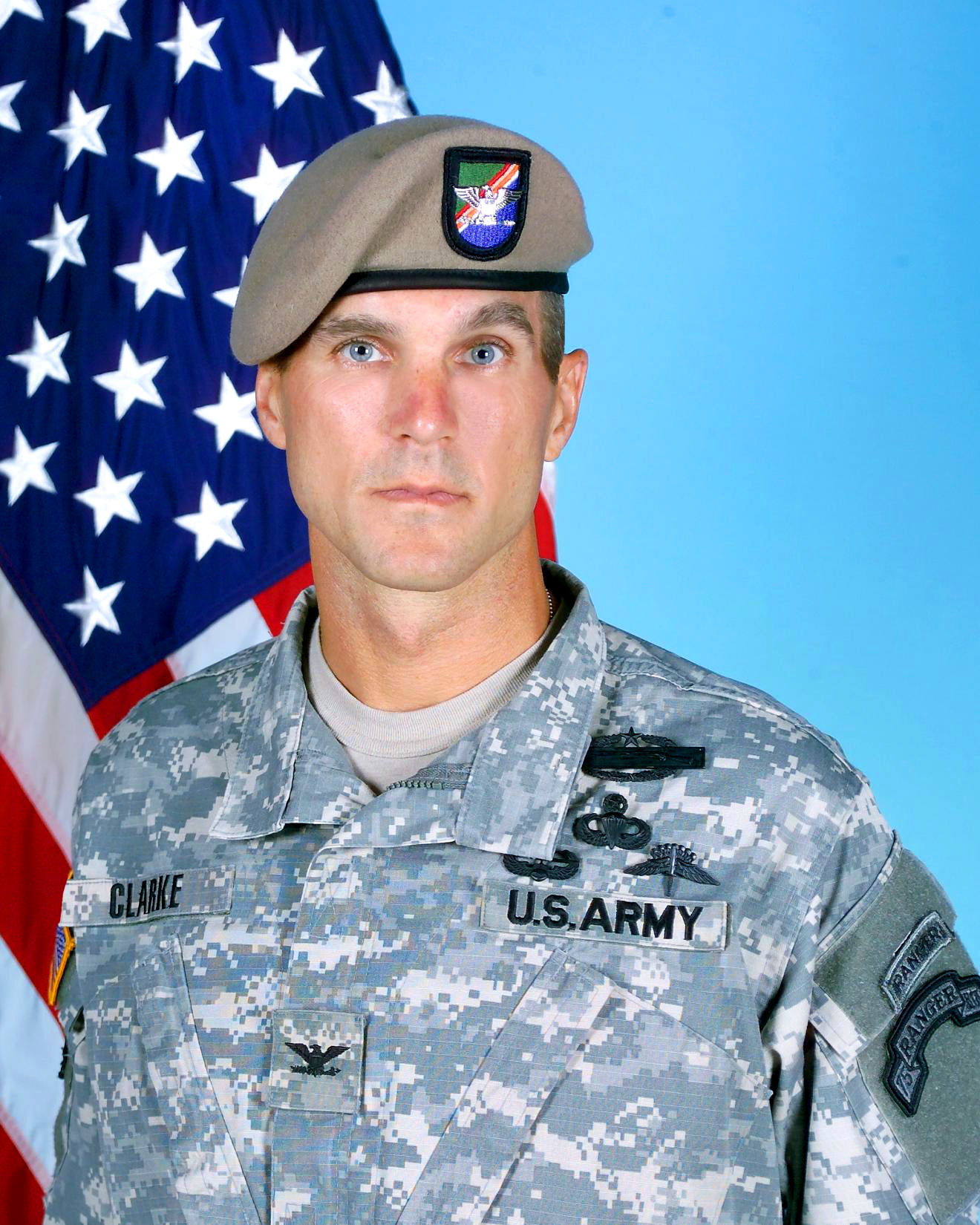
Colonel Richard D. Clarke, a former commanding officer of the U.S. Army's 75th Ranger Regiment, wearing a tan beret.

The tan beret, also known as a beige beret, has been adopted as official headgear by several special operations forces as a symbol of their unique capabilities.

== Afghan National Army ==
Afghan National Army Special Forces members were awarded a tan beret after successfully completing ANA Special Forces Qualification and serving honorably for two deployment cycles. All ANA Special Forces candidates were selected from the Afghan National Army Commandos, where they earned a maroon beret for completing the ANA Commando Qualification Course at Camp Morehead, Kabul Province.

== Argentine Army ==
Troops assigned to one of the three Mountain Brigades of the Argentine Army wear a sand-coloured beret with an embroidered flash.

== Argentine Coast Guard ==
Sailors assigned to the "Agrupacion Guardacostas" -Riot Control Unit- of the Prefectura Naval Argentina wear a sand-coloured beret with a metal flash.

== Australian Army ==
Qualified members of the Australian Special Air Service Regiment wear a sand-coloured beret with a metal gold and silver downward pointing Excalibur sword, wreathed in flames (often incorrectly referred to as a winged dagger) with the motto Who Dares Wins on black cloth Crusader shield.

== Brazilian Army ==
A sand-coloured beret is worn by Airmobile personnel, mostly concentrated in the 12th Light Infantry Brigade (Airmobile) in the State of São Paulo, regardless of Arm of Service. Berets are worn in the French manner, with Army Badge over the right eye and extra material pulled to the left.

== British Army ==
The sand-coloured beret of the Special Air Service is officially designated the beige beret. The beige beret was worn from 1942 till 1944. In 1944, when the SAS returned to the UK they were forced to adopt the maroon beret of the airborne forces as they became part of that command (see Special Air Service Troops). When the SAS was re-raised in 1947 as 21st SAS Artist Rifles they again wore the maroon beret. In 1956 however the SAS officially adopted the beige beret again, an attempt was made to match the original sand coloured cloth beret from those in the possession of veterans. This proved impossible to do from existing approved cloth colour stocks held by the British authorities, so, as a compromise and with no authorisation for expenditure on a new colour dye the nearest acceptable colour was selected and approved by an all ranks committee of the Regimental Association. In 1958 all SAS personnel switched from maroon to beige. Personnel attached to the regiment also wear this beret but with their own badges in accordance with usual British practice.

== Canadian Armed Forces ==
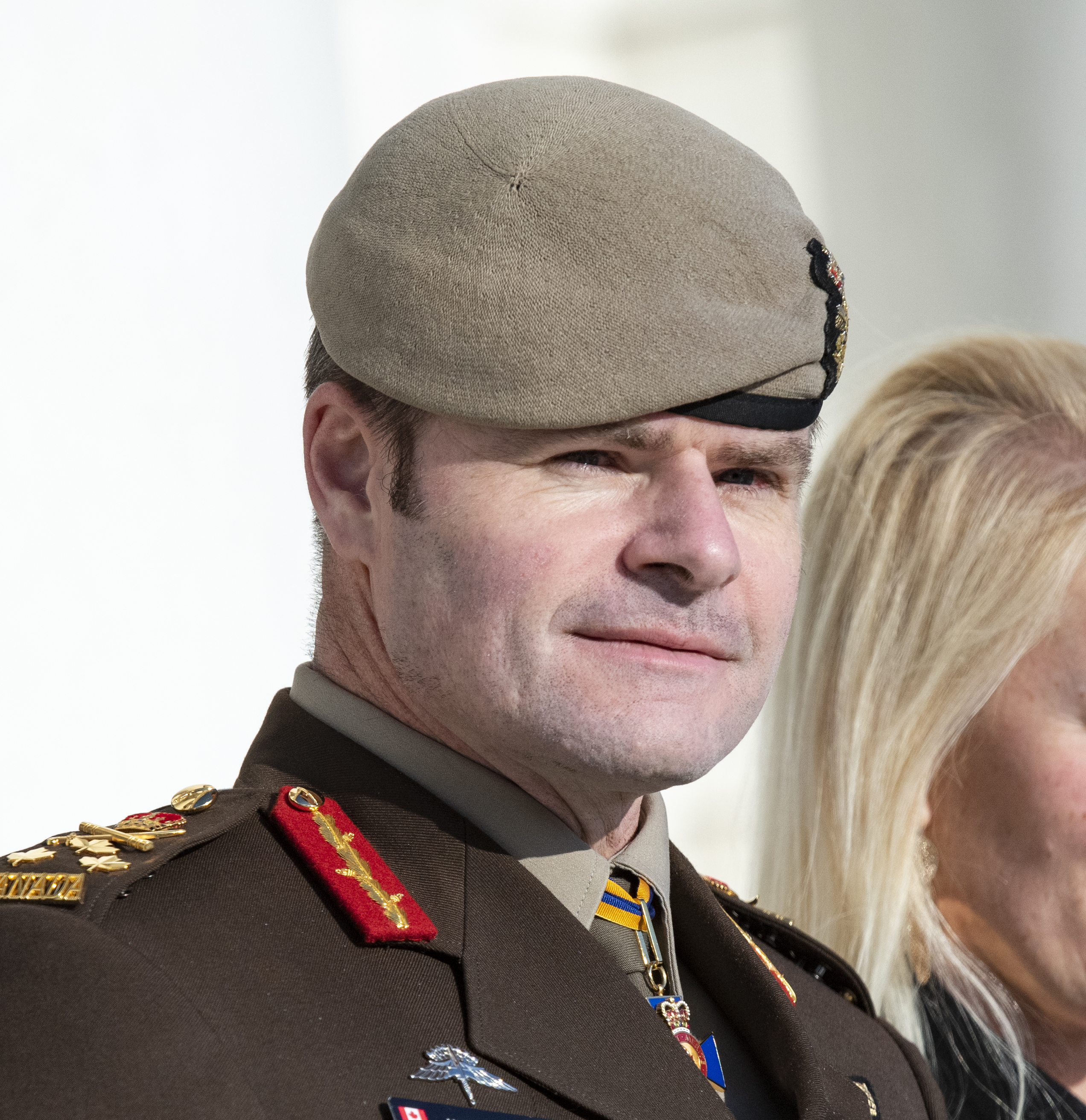
LGen Michael Rouleau wearing the distinctive tan beret of the unit.

There are two groups of CAF members authorized to wear the tan beret. First is the members of the Special Operations Forces Branch. While majority of those are posted in the Canadian Special Operations Forces Command (CANSOFCOM), they are authorized to wear the beret along with their distinctive uniforms outside of CANSOFCOM. The second are those wearing Army, Navy or Air Force uniform and posted in the CANSOFCOM. They are not authorized to wear the tan beret if they leave CANSOFCOM. CANSOFCOM includes the Joint Task Force 2 (JTF2), the Canadian Special Operations Regiment (CSOR), the Canadian Joint Incident Response Unit (CJIRU) and 427 Special Operations Aviation Squadron..

== French Army ==
Brown berets were worn by fortress troops assigned to the Maginot Line during the interwar period of the 1920s through the invasion of 1940. It was also later worn by tirailleur units of the Colonial Army in lieu of the Bonnet de Police.

== Hungarian Armed Forces ==
The 2nd Special Operations Brigade has worn tan berets with special ops wings with dagger since 12 October 2018.

== Italian Army ==
Tan berets are worn by the 17th Raiders Wing (17^{o} Stormo Incursori), the raiders corps of Italian Air Force. Its primary missions are: raids on aeronautical compounds, Forward Air Control, Combat Controlling, and Combat Search and Rescue. Its origins are in the A.D.R.A Arditi Distruttori Regia Aeronautica (Air Force Commandos), a corps of the Second World War. They were used in little-known missions against bridges and Allied airfields in North Africa after the fall of Tunisia. The only well-known mission reported the destruction with explosive charges of 25 B-17s and the killing of 50 bomber crew members.

== Israeli Army ==
Sand-coloured berets are worn by the Combat Intelligence Collection Corps of the Israel Defense Forces.

== New Zealand Army ==
The sand-coloured beret, with a downward pointing Excalibur sword, wreathed in flames (often incorrectly referred to as a winged dagger) with the motto Who Dares Wins on black Crusader shield badge worn by members of the New Zealand Special Air Service and are awarded to personnel who are accepted as members of the unit after passing the arduous selection course and 9 month basic cycle of training.

== Norwegian Army ==
The 2nd Battalion of the Norwegian Army Brigade Nord (North Brigade) uses a sand-coloured beret. However, they are not considered special forces, as their role is mechanised infantry.

== Royal Malaysia Police ==
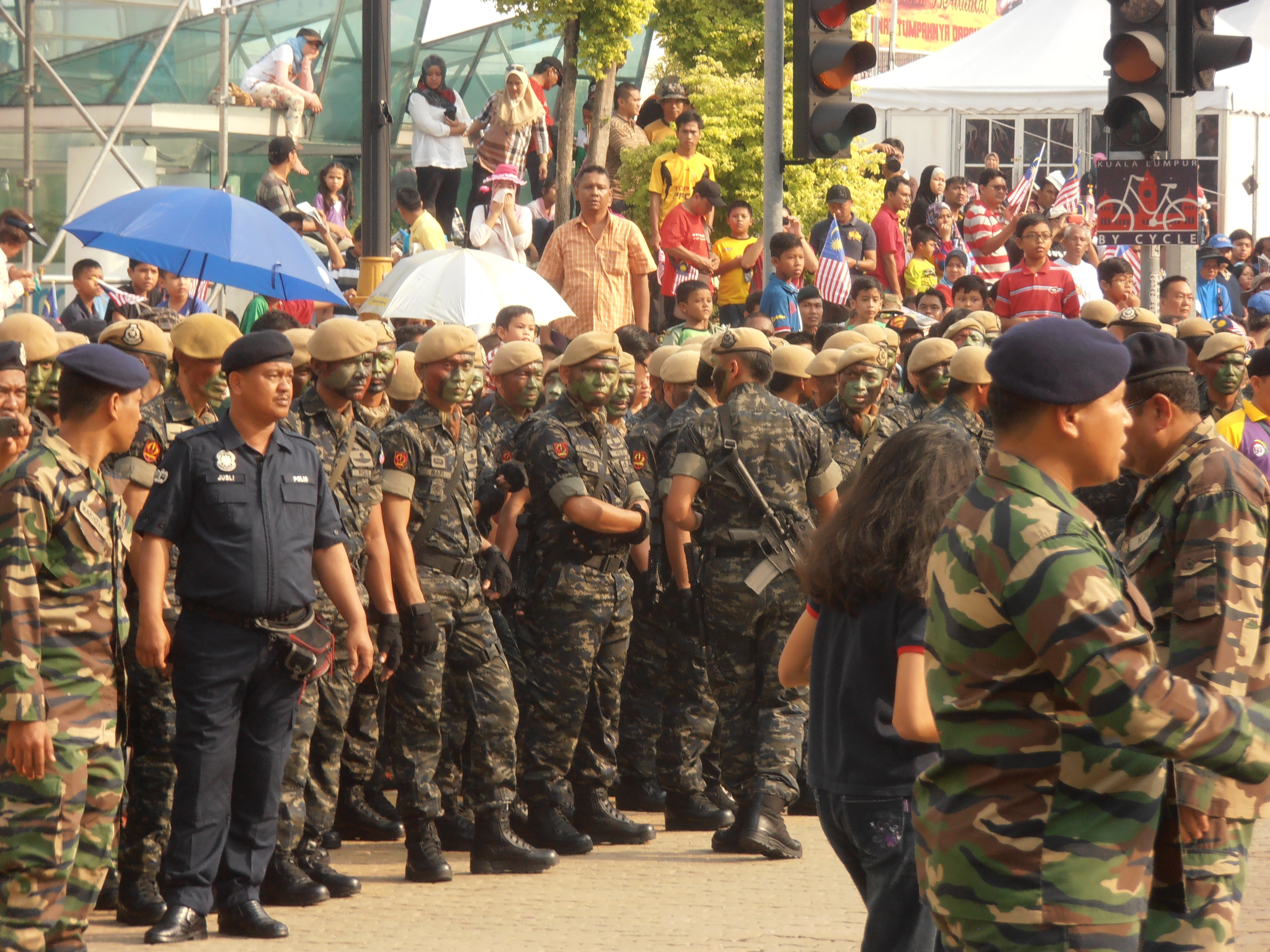
69 Commando special operations unit of the Royal Malaysia Police during the 56th National Day Parade of Malaysia at Merdeka Square, Kuala Lumpur. They are wearing tan berets, a custom adopted from their founding trainers, the British 22nd SAS.

69 Commando of the Royal Malaysia Police adopted the tan beret as part of their uniform after the beret was conferred by the United Kingdom's 22 SAS to the founding members of 69 Commando (also known as VAT 69 - Very Able Trooper 69) after completing SAS training in 1969. 69 Commando is the only unit in Malaysia that wears the tan beret. See: Pasukan Gerakan Khas.

== Spanish Army ==
Spanish Light Infantry Brigade "CANARIAS XVI" uses a sand-coloured beret since April 2011. The BRILCAN, directly subordinated to Canarias General Command, possesses preparation for the aeromobility, combat in population and for the operations in the desert within the framework of the Rapid Action Force that they justify the color of his beret.

== Swedish Army ==
The Swedish Home Guard (Hemvärnet) wears a tan beret.

== Swiss Armed Forces ==
All members of the Special Forces Command wear a tan beret with their uniform.

== United States Army ==
On June 14, 2001 the U.S. Army Rangers assigned to the 75th Ranger Regiment were authorized to wear a distinctive tan beret to replace the black berets that had become the army-wide standard. In the U.S. Army, the tan beret can be worn only by those soldiers assigned to the 75th Ranger Regiment, the Airborne and Ranger Training Brigade, or have served with the regiment for at least one year and are still serving within a unit under the U.S. Army Special Operations Command.

== See also ==
Other military berets by color:

- Black beret
- Green beret, also worn by Special Forces
- Maroon beret
- Red beret
