= Special Operations Forces Branch =

Unified special operations branch of the Canadian Armed Forces

- Branche des forces d'opérations spéciales
- Active: 2017–present
- Country: Canada
- Branch: Canadian Armed Forces
- Type: Personnel branch
- Role: Special operations
- Motto: Commissa ut viam inveniat (Latin for 'Committed to finding a way')

Insignia
- Headdress: Tan beret

The Special Operations Forces Branch (SOFB, French: Branche des forces d'opérations spéciales, BFOS) is a personnel branch of the Canadian Armed Forces, consisting of all members of special operations trades, namely special forces operator (SF OP) and special operations forces officer (SOF O). Nearly all members of the SOFB are employed in Canadian Special Operations Forces Command (CANSOFCOM).

SOFB members wear service dress uniforms that are distinct from the navy, army and air force uniforms. The uniform consists of a dark olive five-button jacket, light olive trousers bloused over mid-calf black jump boots, light khaki shirt and olive tie, and a tan beret.

The branch badge was approved on July 20, 2017, which contains a V-42 stiletto (as do the badges of CANSOFCOM and the Canadian Special Operations Regiment) and the branch motto, Commissa ut viam inveniat, 'Committed to finding a way'.
