= Canadian Joint Incident Response Unit =

- Unité interarmées d'intervention du Canada
- Active: 2005–present
- Country: Canada
- Type: Special operations forces
- Role: National CRBNE Response Team element; CANSOFCOM Immediate Reaction Task Force (counter terrorism); Support CAF expeditionary operations
- Size: Company
- Part of: Canadian Special Operations Forces Command
- Garrison/HQ: 8 Wing/CFB Trenton
- Nicknames: JNBCD Coy, CJIRU, UIIC
- Motto: Nunquam nonparati (Latin for 'never unprepared')
- Colors: Tan beret
- Website: canada.ca/en/special-operations-forces-command/corporate/organizational-structure/joint-incident-response.html

The Canadian Joint Incident Response Unit (CJIRU) (French: Unité interarmées d'intervention du Canada, UIIC) of the Canadian Armed Forces was created "to provide timely and agile broad-based CBRN (chemical, biological, radiological and nuclear) support to the Government of Canada in order to prevent, control and mitigate CBRN threats to Canada, Canadians, and Canadian interests". It is a sub-unit of Canadian Special Operations Forces Command (CANSOFCOM).

== History ==
Subsequent to the terrorist attacks of September 11, 2001, and the Chief Review Services Report on Nuclear, Biological and Chemical Defence of the same year, it became evident that the Canadian Forces needed to increase the breadth of its nuclear, biological and chemical defence (NBCD) capabilities. The federal government, under Prime Minister Jean Chrétien, allotted $30 million in the December 2001 budget to enhance this capability and create the Joint Nuclear, Biological and Chemical Defence Company (JNBCD Coy). In September 2007, JNBCD Coy was reorganized into CJIRU, a rapid-deployment response team due to the company's vast operational capabilities, duties, and responsibilities.

Due to the requirement for rapid deployment of the unit, CJIRU is based alongside airlift assets at 8 Wing Trenton, Ontario. The former-JNBCD Coy Headquarters were at CFB Kingston, Ontario.

== Equipment ==
- Colt Canada C8 rifle
- SIG Sauer P226R and P320F

== See also ==
- Special Operations Engineer Regiment (Australia)
- 28 Engineer Regiment (C-CBRN)
