= Personnel Selection Branch =

Unified personnel selection branch of the Canadian Armed Forces

- Branche des services de la sélection du personnel (French)
- Branch badge
- Active: 18 September 1941
- Country: Canada
- Branch: Canadian Forces personnel branch
- Role: To provide behavioural science services to enable the Canadian Forces to effectively assess, acquire, integrate, and maintain personnel for operational and support roles.
- Motto: Intelligere (Latin for 'to understand')
- March: "Semper Intellegere" (Rondo Sentimentale)

The Personnel Selection Branch (PSEL; French: Branche des services de la sélection du personnel) is a personnel branch of the Canadian Forces (CF).

The PSEL was created in the Canadian Army on 18 September 1941. Later on the Royal Canadian Air Force and Royal Canadian Navy followed suit. Officers of the PSEL provide behavioural science services to enable the Canadian Forces (CF) to effectively assess, acquire, integrate, and maintain personnel for operational and support roles.

== Mission ==
The primary tasks of a personnel selection officer (PSO) require the application of professional behavioural science knowledge and procedures in the assessment of people and human factors that affect working relationships. Through interviews, psychological testing, and other sources of information, PSOs assess the suitability of individuals for military service and recommend subsequent assignment to an appropriate military occupation for training. They also assess and recommend the suitability of military personnel for special training or employment.

== Personnel selection officers ==
PSOs assist CF members with their professional development, accreditation and transition to civilian life, and provide second-career assistance in the form of workshops and counselling to CF members transitioning to a second career. To enable the CF to meet its training and personnel requirements, PSOs provide professional advice to military commanders at all levels and conduct personnel applied and advanced behavioural research at the Director General Military Personnel Research Analysis (DGMPRA) at National Defence Headquarters (NDHQ). They conduct occupational analyses at the Director Personnel Generation Policy at NDHQ. PSOs also teach military leadership, management and behavioural sciences at the Royal Military College of Canada (RMC) and at the Canadian Forces Management Development School (CFMDS). They train and monitor PSOs and military career counsellors (MCCs) in the use of interview, personnel assessment and counselling techniques, either at a base or in recruiting centres. They manage and administer military personnel resettlement programs such as the Second Career Assistance Network (SCAN) at NDHQ, command headquarters (CHQs), formations and bases.

On 5 November 2007, the chief of military personnel announced that the PSEL was to merge with the Training Development Branch along with some unspecified elements of the Logistics Branch to form a new human resources branch. This proposed plan was ultimately abandoned with both branches remaining their own autonomous entities.

Preceded by Music Branch	Personnel Selection Branch	Succeeded by Training Development Branch
