= Canadian Special Operations Regiment =

Special operations forces unit of the Canadian Armed Forces

- Régiment d'opérations spéciales du Canada
- Regimental badge
- Active: 2006–present
- Country: Canada
- Type: Special operations forces
- Role: Special operations
- Size: Battalion
- Part of: Canadian Special Operations Forces Command
- Garrison/HQ: CFB Petawawa
- Motto: Audeamus (Latin for 'Let us dare')
- March: "Over the Hills and Far Away"
- Engagements: Afghanistan; Iraq
- Website: canada.ca/en/special-operations-forces-command/corporate/organizational-structure/so-regiment.html

Commanders
- Notable commanders: LCol Jamie Hammond

Insignia
- Headdress: Tan beret

The Canadian Special Operations Regiment (CSOR) is a special operations forces unit of Canadian Special Operations Forces Command (CANSOFCOM). The CSOR is a high-readiness expeditionary unit tasked with performing special warfare, special reconnaissance, and direct action missions.

The CSOR is mandated with defending Canada and Canadian national interests both abroad and domestically. The CSOR operates under the CANSOFCOM, directed by the Chief of Defence Staff (CDS).

Lieutenant-Colonel Declan Ward is currently CSOR commander as of 2024.

== History ==
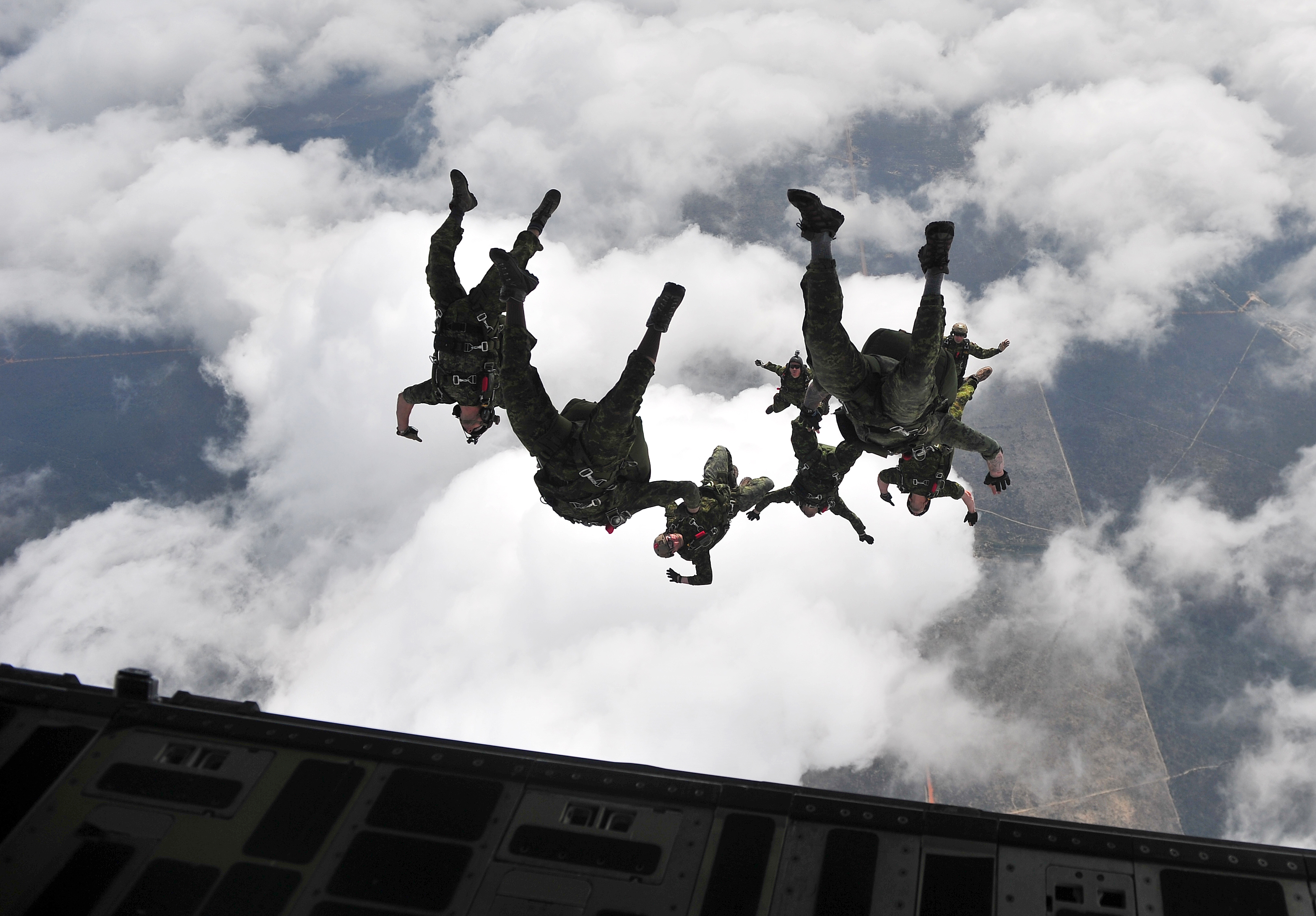
Members of the regiment during a freefall jump out of a U.S. Air Force C-17 Globemaster III during Emerald Warrior 2013, Hurlburt Field, Florida

The unit traces its roots to the First Special Service Force (FSSF), the joint Canadian–American special forces unit that was stood up in 1942 and earned the "Devil's Brigade" moniker for daring night raids on German forces at the Anzio beachhead.

CSOR perpetuates the battle honours of the 1st Canadian Special Service Battalion, the Canadian component of FSSF.

Recruiting for the new unit took place in early 2006, and the first CSOR selection course took place with approximately 175 candidates. However, the individuals need prior military experience, in order to apply. High levels of motivation and physical fitness are required to complete the CSOR Assessment Centre, which is a crucial phase of the selection. Personnel can join as either Special Forces Operator or Special Operations Supporter. In the first case, the individuals are specialists directly employed in the tactical aspects of the missions. In the latter, the role consists of support personnel to the staff officer and other positions within the unit.

On 13 August 2006, an official stand-up ceremony for CSOR took place at the unit's home station, Canadian Forces Base (CFB) Petawawa, with approximately 250 soldiers participating. The ceremony included a skills demonstration including rappelling from helicopters, and both static and freefall parachuting. It was also announced that the second training serial of CSOR recruits would take place in early 2007. The first commanding officer and regimental sergeant-major of CSOR were Lieutenant-Colonel (LCol) Jamie Hammond and Chief Warrant Officer (CWO) Gerald Scheidl.

The regiment suffered its first casualty on 24 June 2011: Master-Corporal Francis Roy died in a non-combat incident while deployed in Kandahar Province, Afghanistan.

In 2013, the unit competed in an international special forces competition held in Jordan, coming in third place after Chinese Special Police teams took first and second place.

In March 2015, Sgt Andrew Joseph Doiron was killed by friendly fire while serving on Operation Impact in Iraq.

During the Battle of Mosul, the CSOR engaged ISIS forces while also protecting and evacuating civilians.

On December 5, 2024, the unit received the first regimental standard flag during a ceremony led by Governor General Mary Simon.

=== Operations and exercises ===
The regiment maintained a presence in Afghanistan from 2006 to 2014 in support of Canada's mission in Afghanistan.

Under the auspices of the Anti-Crime Capacity Building Program of Global Affairs Canada, CSOR conducted training with both the Jamaica Defence Force and the Belize Defence Force from 2008, with CSOR participating in Exercise Tropical Dagger in 2016.

In 2012, CSOR operators trained the Malian Army's Autonomous Special Forces Battalion, which participated in failed anti-coup operations in the 2012 Malian coup d'état.

CSOR participates in Exercise Flintlock, a special operations forces–focused exercise planned, coordinated and executed by African partner nations and sponsored by United States Africa Command.

CSOR participates in the CANSOFCOM commitment to Operation Impact, the Canadian Armed Forces' support to the international military intervention against ISIL in Iraq and Syria.

Due to the Taliban offensive in 2021, CSOR operators were deployed to Afghanistan to assist Canadian embassy staff to leave and destroy anything sensitive.

== Selection process ==
The trades to apply for are special forces operator and special operations supporter.

CSOR takes candidates from all branches. The process to become a member is persistent and challenging. The training that the recruits go through is highly selective and rigorous. In 2006, for the first selection course, 300 soldiers applied, 175 were selected and only 125 completed the training. The general requirements for the candidates are:

- Minimum two years of military service for Regular forces, and three years for Reserves.
- Complete the Pre-Screening Physical Fitness Test (PFT)
- Complete a parachute training
- Obtain security clearance

The CSOR PFT for special forces operator candidates consists of:

- 20-metre shuttle run
- Minimum 40 press-ups and 40 sit-ups in one minute
- Minimum five pull-ups
- Combat Swim Test that consists of a 25-metre swim in combat uniform, boots, rifle and no flotation
- Loaded march of 13 kilometres with 35 kg in less than 2 hours and 26 minutes
- Casualty evacuation of a similar-size soldier (minimum 70 kg) to a distance of 25 metres carrying their own and the casualty’s weapon.

The PFT for special operations supporter is different, since the number of skills and the amount of knowledge required is less than the one for a special forces operator. It consists of:

- Basic military swim test that includes rudimentary swimming skills and water safety knowledge
- Loaded march of 13 kilometres with 24.5 kg in less than 2 hours and 26 minutes
- Casualty evacuation of a similar-size soldier (minimum 70 kg) to a distance of 25 metres carrying their own and the casualty’s weapon.

Those who complete the whole selection process and training receive the regiment’s tan beret and join either the Special Forces Company, one of the three direct action companies, the Support Company, or Regimental Headquarters.

== Organization ==
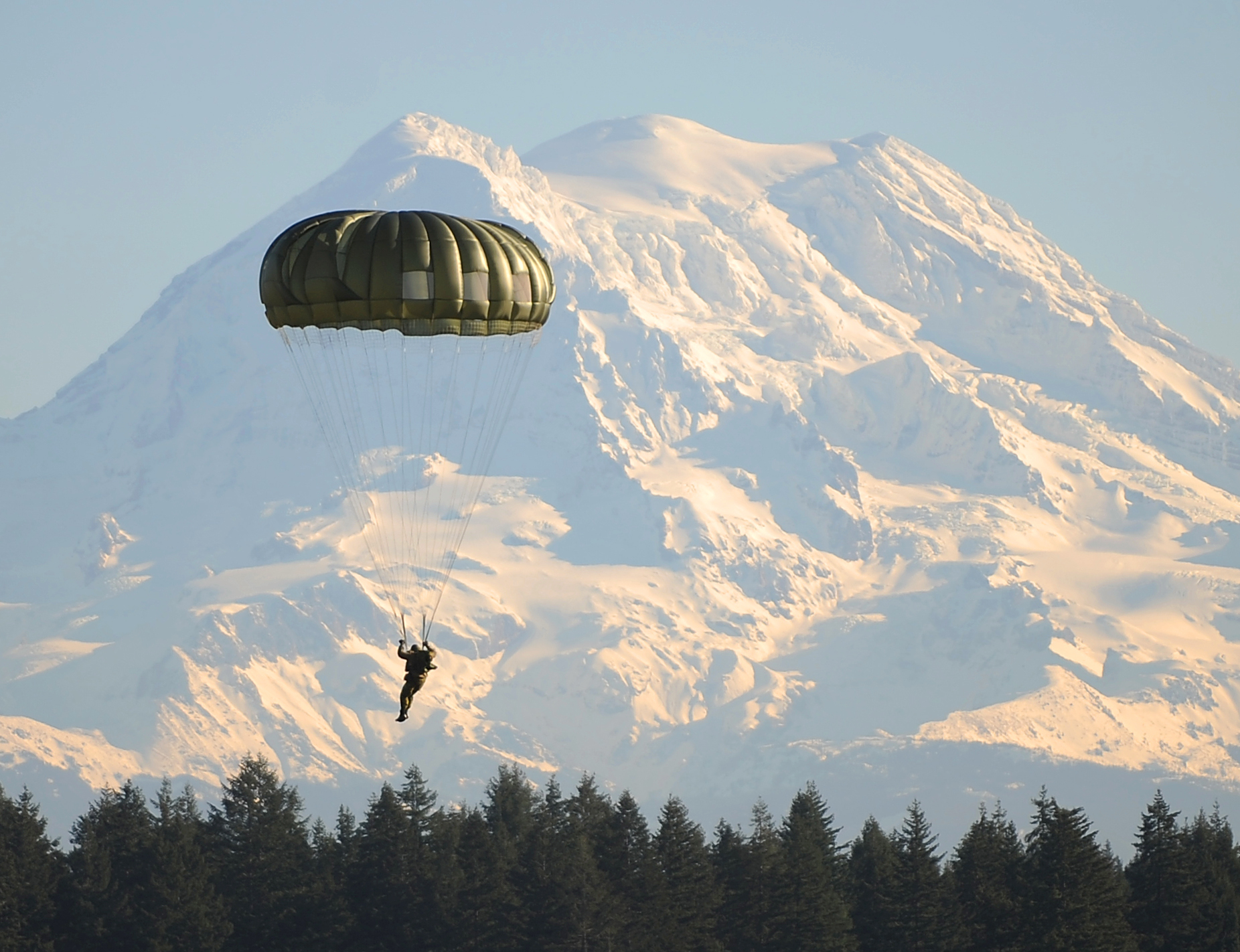
Canadian special operator descends in front of Mount Rainier onto Fort Lewis, Washington, US, with US 1st Special Forces Group

CSOR consists of 5 companies,

Regiment Headquarters (HQ)

- 1st Company (direct action, special reconnaissance)
- 2nd Company (direct action, special reconnaissance)
- 3rd Company (direct action, special reconnaissance)
- Special Forces Company
- Support Company

The CSOR’s concept of operation is very similar to the US Army’s 75th Ranger Regiment. 1st, 2nd and 3rd companies are designated as direct action units focusing on short-duration strikes, raids, and sabotage to seize or destroy high-value targets. They also conduct special reconnaissance on covert, deep-behind-enemy-lines intelligence gathering, target identification, and surveillance to support operational goals. The Special Forces Company trains and advises allied military forces in counterinsurgency and counterterrorism, similar to a Green Beret unit.

While the regiment is composed of personnel from the Canadian Army, Royal Canadian Navy and Royal Canadian Air Force, it is part of CANSOFCOM, a joint command reporting directly to the Chief of the Defence Staff, responsible for providing agile, high-readiness special operations forces capable of operating across the spectrum of conflict at home and abroad.

== Equipment ==
CSOR utilizes standard Canadian army gear, as well as Multicam. CSOR utilizes the SIG Sauer P226 and Glock 45 as their standard issued pistol. They also utilize the C8, C9, C6 and the Carl Gustaf 84mm Recoilless Rifle.

=== Battle honours ===
- Monte Camino
- Monte la Difensa – Monte la Remetanea
- Monte Majo
- Anzio
- Rome
- Advance to the Tiber
- Italy, 1943–1944
- Southern France
- North-West Europe, 1944
- Afghanistan

The Second World War honours are borne because of CSOR's perpetuation (established in 2008) of 1st Canadian Special Service Battalion. On 5 December 2024 the Governor General (Mary Simon) presented the regimental standard emblazoned with the battle honours.

=== Regimental association ===
The Canadian Special Operations Regiment Association was incorporated May 2016 and founded to provide an avenue to resources and support services, including training, social services, family education grants, emergency support services and the like.

== Bibliography ==
- Rhoads, Franklyn. (2012). Elite Warriors: Special Operations Forces of the World (ebook) (1st ed.). New Delhi, India: World Technologies. ISBN 9788132328537.
- Horn, Col. Bernd (2016). No Ordinary Men: Special Operations Forces missions in Afghanistan (ebook). Toronto, Ontario, Canada: Dundurn. ISBN 9781459724105.
- Horn, Col. (retired) Bernd; Ilis-Alm, Col. (retired) Hans, eds. (2024). Force Multiplier: Utilization of SOF from a Small State Perspective (ebook). 17 Wing Winnipeg Publishing Office. ISBN 9780660693637.
