= Corps of Royal Canadian Electrical and Mechanical Engineers =

Unified engineering maintenance support branch of the Canadian Armed Forces

- Corps du génie électrique et mécanique royal canadien
- Corps badge
- Active: 15 May 1944–present
- Country: Canada
- Branch: Canadian Armed Forces
- Type: Personnel branch
- Role: Army engineering maintenance
- Home station: Royal Canadian Electrical and Mechanical Engineers School (RCEMES) situated at CFB Borden
- Nickname: Bluebell
- Mottos: Arte et Marte (Latin for 'By skill and by fighting (Note: Marte is the ablative form of Mars, god of war)')
- Colours: Blue, yellow, red, light blue
- March: "RCEME Corps March Past" (Both "Lillibulero" and "Auprès de ma blonde" should be played); Slow march: "The Craftsman"
- Mascot: Sadie

Insignia
- Headdress: Dark blue beret

The Corps of Royal Canadian Electrical and Mechanical Engineers (RCEME) (French: Corps du génie électrique et mécanique royal canadien) is a personnel branch of the Canadian Armed Forces (CF) that provides army engineering maintenance support. All members of the corps wear army uniform. From the 1980s to 2013 it was called the Electrical and Mechanical Engineering Branch.

== History ==
The Royal Canadian Electrical and Mechanical Engineers came into being officially on 15 May 1944, with the fusion of various elements from the Royal Canadian Engineers, Royal Canadian Army Service Corps and Royal Canadian Ordnance Corps, following the model of the Royal Electrical and Mechanical Engineers (REME).

With the increase of mechanized equipment during World War II, the need to have one corps dedicated to service and maintenance thereof was becoming increasingly apparent. Trucks had become the de facto means of transportation and logistic support, armoured vehicles had replaced cavalry, weapons were becoming more complicated, as well as the advent of radios and radar, it was apparent that the previous model of having a different corps for each job was inadequate for a modern, mechanized army.

The majority of RCEME technicians were, and still are, vehicle mechanics, but the original RCEME structure incorporated 25 different trades and sub-trades, employing specialists for each particular job in order to train and deploy them in time to meet the war's demand. While it was somewhat bulky, it was nonetheless a centralized structure for maintaining the Army's everyday equipment which was more efficient than the previous system of having each corps perform its own equipment maintenance, and also allowed for a greater degree of specialization within trades.

=== RCEME formation and early years ===
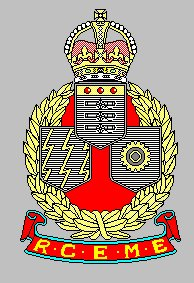
RCEME 1944

The RCEME Corps badge consisted of a laurel wreath, three shields, the Tudor Crown surmounting, and the letters R.C.E.M.E. on a scroll underneath. Emblazoned on the shields were: on the first, three lightning bolts, which represented the telecommunications trades, three cannons, which represented armament, and a large gear, representing the vehicle mechanics. On the second shield, above the three cannons are three cannonballs, which are larger than the cannons. This came from the Royal Canadian Ordnance Corps, which in turn inherited it from its British counterpart, the Royal Army Ordnance Corps. There has been a misconception that its significance goes back to the Crimean War when ammunition shipped to the front was too big to fit in the cannons, and was intended to remind the members of that Corps of how imperative doing their job well was (though it was not really their fault; it was the manufacturer's mistake) however this is untrue. In the first place the Board of Ordnance, adopted the Arms (from which the Ordnance Shield derives) as early as the mid 17th Century, a good hundred years before the Crimean War started. At which time the shield was used by the artillery as well. The Arms were approved by the King in 1806, and the grant of Arms by the College Arms particularly states that they be the same as those previously in use.

Secondly, in good heraldic design, not only to show the charges, which in this case are the guns and shot, symbolically and sometimes exaggerated, but that these charges should fill the shield in which they are placed without losing the balance of the design as a whole. The placing of the cannonballs in the chief and the guns in the lower two-thirds of the shield illustrate this aspect of recognized heraldic design.

There was some debate as to what the regimental march should be, and several tunes, including "Heigh Ho, Heigh Ho!" from Snow White and the Seven Dwarfs were proposed, but the final tune chosen was a medley of "Lillibullero" and "Auprès de ma blonde", just as REME had chosen. However, there were some things that RCEME chose differently from their British counterparts. The regimental slow march of REME was not chosen for RCEME, but rather, the tune chosen was "The Flower of Scotland", and St. Jean de Brébeuf was named the patron saint.

Each division had a central workshop, where major repairs would be conducted, and within the division, RCEME units would be embedded to effectuate certain repairs (1st Line) on the spot. This included light aid detachments, which could deploy quickly to recover or repair equipment on the line, or in transit to the front. The RCEME triage system was divided into three groups: 1st Line, which would be embedded in the operational units, would carry out routine maintenance and minor repairs; 2nd Line, which was located in field workshops back from the front, carried out major overhauls and full component replacements; 3rd Line would be responsible for reconditioning and rebuilding equipment. Though the location of each and various tasks have changed, the structure is still in place today, with 1st Line maintenance platoons / troops embedded in combat units, while 2nd Line is located 20 minutes to 2 hours away, but still in theatre, and the only 3rd Line workshop in service is 202 Workshop in Montreal.

In 1949, the RCEME Corps adopted a new badge, nearly identical to the British one which had been struck in 1947. It consisted of a white horse (a mustang, as opposed to the Arabian horse of the British badge) superimposed over a lightning bolt, with a chain fixed around its neck running down its back, standing on a globe, to which the other end of the chain is attached, which pictured the Western Hemisphere (whereas the British badge pictured Europe, Africa, Australia, Antarctica and Asia). Behind the horse's head was a scroll with the letters R.C. on one side of the head, and E.M.E. on the other, surmounted by the Tudor Crown.

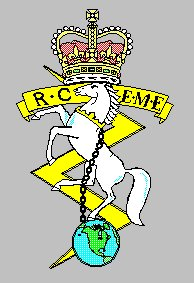
Rceme1952

The only modification ever made to this badge was in 1952 when Elizabeth II ascended to the throne, and the Tudor Crown was replaced with St. Edward's Crown.

During the 1950s, the RCEME Corps was reorganized to accommodate the postwar structure of the Army, and many trades were combined, due to the need to have specialists quickly fielded for the war no longer existing. Young craftsmen (as privates in the corps are called) trained in their trade at the Royal Canadian School of Electrical and Mechanical Engineering, located in Kingston, Ontario, then deployed to the various squadrons and troops of RCEME to perform their trades.

In the mid-1960s, Canadian Army planners were again looking to streamline the structure of the Army, and beginning in 1965, various models were proposed for combining the elements of maintenance, supply and transport for each brigade into one unit. The result was the formation in 1968 of service battalions, each consisting of maintenance, supply and transport companies, while craftsmen who had previously belonged to RCEME squadrons and only attached to the combat unit, were incorporated directly into the unit, and administered through the unit's chain of command rather than the RCEME squadrons and troops, which ceased to exist. RCEME ceased to have its own autonomous chain of command; they worked for a service battalion with Supply and Transport, or a service company or squadron within a combat unit.

=== RCEME to LORE ===
1968 also saw the unification of the Canadian Forces, which saw the RCEME Corps disbanded, and replaced with the Canadian Forces Land Ordnance Engineering Branch. Several RCEME trades were shed off and went over to the Air Force, such as machinist and metals technician, the Radio and Radar Techs and the RCEME flag, which consisted of three horizontal stripes of dark blue on top, yellow in the middle, and red on the bottom, received a fourth stripe: light blue, to represent the Air Force personnel now working the LORE workshops. In spite of the RCEME Corps being disbanded, Canada's craftsmen continued to wear the old cap badge until 1973 when a new one was introduced. The new badge was an oval in shape, had a wreath of 10 maple leaves, which represented Canada's ten provinces, and on a blue field, which represented the Air Force, were a lightning bolt, superimposed on two crossed cannons, superimposed on a Wankel-type piston (the symbol the Society of Automotive Engineers) and surmounted by St. Edward's Crown.

The 1970s also saw more trades added to the LORE Branch, and existing trades condensed. For example, all the trades pertaining to repair of vehicles were grouped together into the vehicle technician's trade, all weapon-related trades were combined into the weapons technician trade, and all electrical trades were grouped together into the electro-mechanical technician. All the material-support trades were transferred to the air force.

In the 1980s, it was confirmed that the organization of materials support was inadequate for the army's needs; some trades were performed by vehicle technicians, such as auto-body, others by air force trades, such as machinists, and welding was divided between the air force's metals technician and the army's vehicle technician trades. In 1985, these were all combined into the materials technician's trade, belonging to the LORE Branch. It was also around this time that the LORE title was decided to be inaccurate in its description of the craftsmen's trades. After several proposals (including odd ones such as CREME), the title Land Electrical and Mechanical Engineers was finally settled upon for a new title. The badge did not change.

== RCEME today ==
1990–2024 version of the badge

The concession to adopt the EME letters spurred an interest in reviving tradition, and bringing the horse badge back, which was spearheaded by Brigadier-General Jim Hanson, Chief Warrant Officer John Sloan and Chief Warrant Officer Ron Roy, and led into the early 1990s. The new badge would have to be modelled on the old horse, but at the same time, reflect the changes in the army and in the trades that had occurred since. The new badge had several proposals. It would definitely include the letters EME and GEM (Génie électrique et mécanique) in place of the former RCEME title. The original proposal had the title GEM on one side of the horse's head, and EME on the other, so that it conformed to the pattern of other Commonwealth services (REME (UK), RAEME (Australia), RNZEME (New Zealand)), but it was decided that "GEMEME" would not be used, and it was thus reversed to EME GEM to conform with CF rules on signs. (On documents and other items that include both French and English, the English goes on the left and the French on the right.) There are other subtle differences between the old horse badge and the new one, such as the coronet of fleurs-de-lis being replaced with four maple leaves, and the horse's nose being shortened to accommodate three letters in front of it instead of two.

== RCEME restored ==
On April 19, 2013, the Minister of National Defence announced the restoration of the name Corps of Royal Canadian Electrical and Mechanical Engineers. On January 9, 2019, permission to add the badge of the RCME to the corps’ camp flag was granted from the inspector of Canadian colours and badges. On November 15, 2024, the Canadian Royal Crown was added to the badge.

== Occupations ==
The RCEME Corps is charged with the maintenance of all electrical and mechanical equipment in use in the Canadian Army. Members of the RCEME Corps belong to six military occupational structure identifications (MOSID):

Rank group	MOSID	Occupation
Officer	00187	Electrical and mechanical engineering officer (EME)
Non-commissioned member	00129	Vehicle technician (veh tech)
Non-commissioned member	00130	Weapons technician (land) (W tech L)
Non-commissioned member	00134	Material technician (mat tech)
Non-commissioned member	00327	Electronic-optronic technician – land (EO tech (L))
Non-commissioned member	00388	Land equipment engineering technologist (LEET)

== Training ==
=== Royal Canadian Electrical and Mechanical Engineers School ===
Royal Canadian Electrical and Mechanical Engineers School (RCEMES) (French: École du génie électrique et mécanique royal canadien) in Borden, Ontario, conducts training for EME officers, LEET, Veh Techs, W Techs L, EO Techs (L) and Mat Techs. RCEMES conducts individual and specialized training for the Regular and Reserve forces. The school offers 54 different technical courses for approximately 900 students.

RCEMES has previously been known as the Royal Canadian School of Electrical and Mechanical Engineering (RCSEME) and the Canadian Forces School of Electrical and Mechanical Engineering (CFSEME): it has been alternately located in Kingston, Ontario, Canadian Forces Base Borden, Ontario, and the Saint-Jean Garrison, Saint-Jean-sur-Richelieu, Quebec. In the early years of RCEME, the school alternated between Kingston and Borden, holding both English and French courses, until the General J.F. Allard Megaplex was built in Saint-Jean. This not only served as the recruit school for French-speaking recruits, but also became the home of the Canadian Forces Technical School (École technique des Forces canadiennes, ETFC), where French-speaking craftsmen (artisans) studied in their trades before being posted to their respective units. This changed when the ETFC was merged with RCEME School in the early 1990s, to make room for the English-speaking recruits in Saint-Jean when Canadian Forces Leadership and Recruit School Cornwallis was closed. The school is at Canadian Forces Base Borden, and has five companies: Headquarters Company, Regimental Company, Artisan Company, and Vehicle Company.

==== Regimental Company ====
Upon completing Recruit Training and Soldier Qualification, then being posted to Canadian Forces Base Borden, future craftsmen take a two-week-long course called Common RCEME Training or CRT, which introduces them to the history of their trades, the march past, the badge, unit structure and RCEME traditions, such as Sadie, a statue taken from a garden in Italy during World War II, that accompanied the RCEME craftsmen through the rest of the war, and was finally placed in a glass case in the main hallway of Regimental Company, where she stays, except for occasional excursions for special events. It is at Regimental Company that the trainees are first given the title "craftsman". EME officers begin their Development Period (DP) 1 training or occupational course at Regimental Company, where they too are introduced to the history and traditions of the RCEME, as well as undergoing a two-week-long field exercise to apply the technical and tactical skills that they learned in the classroom. EME officer DP1 training includes elements at both Vehicle Company and Artisan Company in order to familiarize future maintenance officers with various types of workshop and the jobs that are performed in each by the technicians who will be under their command.

==== Artisan Company ====
Once they have successfully completed CRT, the trainees move to Artisan Company for a month-long course called Common RCEME Technical Training which focuses on certain technical skills that are universal throughout their four various trades. Once this course is completed, the vehicle technicians, materials technicians, weapons technicians and electronic-optronic technicians stay at Artisan Company to complete their DP 1 or basic trade-qualification courses.

==== Vehicle Company ====
Since two-thirds of the RCEME craftsmen are vehicle technicians, a separate company had to be formed to train such a large number of technicians. Once finished CRT and CRTT, vehicle technician candidates are sent to Vehicle Company to complete their DP 1 training, which lasts 30 weeks. Upon completion of DP 1, as with the other three trades, the craftsmen are then posted to various units across Canada to complete about 18 months of apprenticeship before going back to Canadian Forces Base Borden to complete their DP 2, or senior technician's courses.

=== Units of employment ===
Most craftsmen will end up working in a service battalion, of which the Canadian Army has three that operate in a Regular Force capacity: 1 Service Battalion, based in Edmonton, Alberta, which supplies services for 1 Canadian Mechanized Brigade Group or 1 CMBG; while 2 Service Battalion serves 2 CMBG, based at CFB Petawawa, Ontario; and 5 Service Battalion provides these services for the 5 CMBG based at CFB Valcartier just north of Quebec City.

Trainees are rotated through various units during their apprenticeship in order to gain experience in different types of equipment and environments. Though most will be posted to a service battalion, many will work in the various maintenance platoons and troops that are integrated with combat-arms units, providing integral support to those units in whichever theatre of operations they may be deployed.

EME officers will also be typically posted upon completion of their phase training, to a service battalion to familiarize themselves with the challenges and requirements of leading soldiers while simultaneously making administrative and technical decisions relative to a workshop's every day functions. This is where they will combine their university training with their military training, and make decisions, under the guidance of more senior officers and experienced non-commissioned members, to provide a workshop that meets both the technical and tactical needs of the units for whom they provide services. Once they reach the rank of captain, they may then be posted to a combat unit's maintenance platoon / troop, within a combat unit which they will fully command.

The majority of RCEME technicians are craftsmen and corporals, while master corporals, sergeants and warrant officers act as supervisors, and captains, who make up the bulk of EME officers, command maintenance platoons / troops in a unit's service company.

== Bibliography ==
- RCEME History and Early Years:
  1. CET course material, CFSEME Regimental Coy, CFTSG Borden, CFB Borden, Ontario. Instructor: Beresford, Sergeant T., C.D.;
  2. The Canadian Soldier: D-Day to VE Day by Bouchery, Jean Editions Histoire et Collections Paris, 2003;
  3. EME Journal, Issue 1 - 2005, Department of National Defence Publication, 202 WD Montreal, 2005.
  4. Images Canadian Government copyright.
- RCEME to LORE:
  1. CET course material, CFSEME Regimental Coy, CFTSG Borden, CFB Borden, Ontario. Instructor: Beresford, Sergeant T., C.D.;
  2. Image Canadian Government Copyright.
- Colonel Johnston and RCEME Today
  1. CET course material, CFSEME Regimental Coy, CFTSG Borden, CFB Borden, Ontario. Instructor: Beresford, Sergeant T., C.D.;
  2. Giffin, Cfn. KDW, 5^{e} Bataillon des Services du Canada, CFB Valcartier, Quebec;
  3. Department of National Defence Recruiting Cell, NDHQ Ottawa;
  4. The EME Journal, Issue 2, 2004, EME Branch Adjutant's Office, CFB Borden, Ontario, 2004;
  5. Image of Colonel Murray C. Johnston receiving the Meritous Service Decoration at Rideau Hall released by the Office of Her Excellency, the Rt. Hon. Adrienne Clarkson, Governor General of Canada. Photo by Master Corporal Paz Quillé, Canadian Forces Imaging Service.
  6. Images of RCEME badge and CFSEME badge Canadian Government Copyright
  7. Image of 5^{e} BNS du C unit slide from Giffin, Cfn. KDW, 5^{e} BNS du C., CFB Valcartier, Quebec. Public Domain
  8. Image of RCEME Maintenance Platoon Deployment Structure Giffin, Cfn. KDW, 5^{e} BNS du C., CFB Valcartier, Quebec. Public Domain

== Notes and references ==
Preceded by Dental Branch	Electrical and Mechanical Engineering Branch	Succeeded by Royal Canadian Chaplain Service
