= Royal Air Force March Past =

Official march of the Royal Air Force

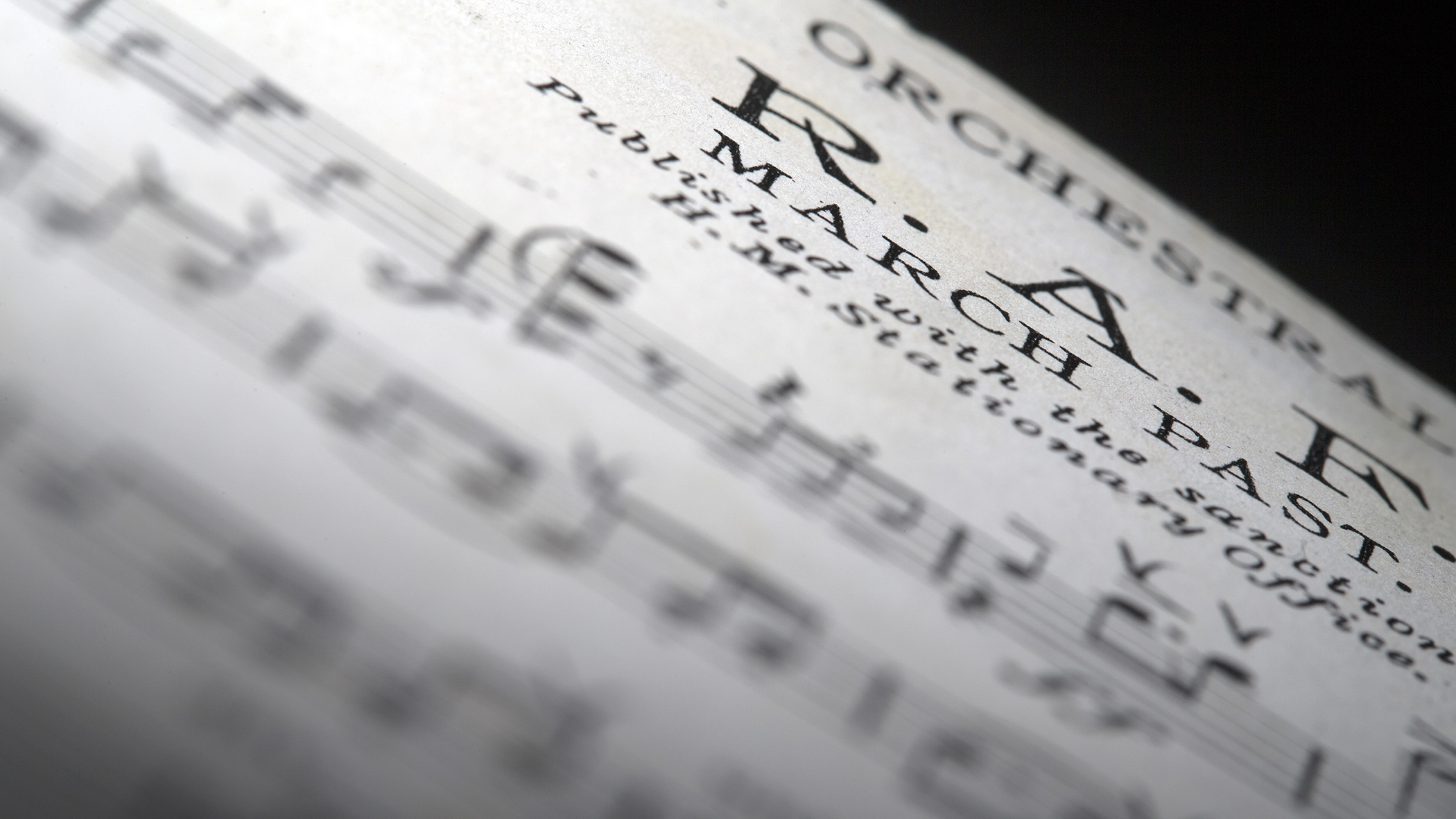
Sheet music

"Royal Air Force March Past" is the official march of the Royal Air Force (RAF) and is used in some other Commonwealth air forces like the Royal Canadian Air Force and the Royal New Zealand Air Force.

The original score was completed by Walford Davies in 1918 for the new RAF. It combined the rhythm of the bugle call of the Royal Flying Corps with that of the Royal Naval Air Service. The call appears in both the introduction and the coda. It was originally known as the Adastral I (in reference to the RAF's motto). The second part of the march past, the trio, was composed by Sir George Dyson.

The march can be played both as a slow march and a quick march, and has been used as both when the King's Colour Squadron and RAF bands perform public duties such as mounting the guard at Buckingham Palace.

== Canadian version ==
Authority was granted in February 1943 by His Majesty's Stationery Office to publish the "RAF March Past" piece in Canada under the title "RCAF March Past". It was the official march of the Royal Canadian Air Force until the unification of the Canadian Armed Forces in 1968. Following unification, the march was authorized for use in the Air Operations Branch, and further authorized as the command march of Air Command in 1975, later renamed back to its historic name as the Royal Canadian Air Force in 2011. The RCAF March Past continues as the official march of the RCAF. It is also the official march of the Royal Canadian Air Cadets and the Air Force Association of Canada.

A pipe band arrangement was composed in the 1950s by pipe major Alex Howie of the CFB Trenton Pipe band, and a trio for pipes was composed in 1970 by pipe major Archie Cairns.

== Lyrics ==
The following are the lyrics to be sung to the Trio section of the march (composed by George Dyson). It references the motto of the RAF, Per Ardua Ad Astra (Latin; "Through adversity to the stars").

RAF March Past
Through adversities we'll conquer.
Blaze into the stars,
A trail of glory
We'll live on land and sea
'Til victory is won.
Men in blue the skies are winging
In each heart one thought is ringing.
Fight for the right,
God is our might,
We shall be free.
