= Training Development Branch =

Unified training and development branch of the Canadian Armed Forces

- Active: 1980–present
- Country: Canada
- Branch: Canadian Armed Forces personnel branch
- Role: Training and development of both new recruit and experienced officers, air men and women, sailors and soldiers of the CF.
- Part of: Chief Military Personnel
- Motto: Always Seeking a Better Way
- March: "Salut"

The Training Development Branch (French: Branche du développement et de la formation) is a personnel branch of the Canadian Armed Forces (CAF). It primarily deals in training and development of both new recruits and experienced officers, airmen and -women, sailors and soldiers of the CAF.

== Training ==
=== Canadian Forces Training Development Centre ===
The Canadian Forces Training Development Centre (CFTDC) in Borden, Ontario, is the Centre of Excellence for training and training development for the Department of National Defence DND and the Canadian Forces.

== Mission ==
The CFTDC mission is to provide training in instructional methods and training development, e-Learning development services, and training development support to the CF. The CFTDC also provides advice and guidance on instructional design and delivery of training to CF training establishments across the country. In addition, CFTDC is active in the evaluation, research and development of training methods and technologies.

Preceded by Personnel Selection Branch	Training Development Branch	Succeeded by Public Affairs Branch
