= Legal Branch =

Unified legal affairs branch of the Canadian Armed Forces

- Branche des services juridiques (French)
- Badge of the Legal Branch
- Country: Canada
- Branch: Canadian Armed Forces
- Role: Canadian Forces' legal affairs
- Mottos: Latin: Fiat justitia, lit. 'Let justice be done'
- March: "Hymn to Freedom"

Commanders
- Colonel-in-chief: Vacant

The Legal Branch (French: Branche des services juridiques) is a personnel branch of the Canadian Armed Forces (CAF). It primarily deals with the Canadian Forces' legal affairs. Legal officers are primarily accepted through the Direct-Entry Training Program, and must have a degree in law as well as be a member of a Canadian provincial or territorial bar. However, the CAF also selects a few currently serving members each year to attend law school and join the Legal Branch through the Military Legal Training Plan.

== Training ==
=== Military Law Centre ===
The Military Law Centre on the grounds of the Royal Military College of Canada (RMC) in Kingston, Ontario, which is staffed with nine military lawyers, oversees the education of officers and troops in legal matters ranging from the Forces' own code of conduct to the laws of war. It trains military lawyers and advises Ottawa on matters of policy and doctrine. The centre integrates legal education into the regular training that Forces members undergo and establishes its growing importance within the military hierarchy.

Selected RMC cadets participate in Law of Armed Conflict international competitions each fall with cadets from the United States Air Force Academy, the United States Military Academy, the United States Naval Academy and the United States Coast Guard Academy. In spring 2008, RMC cadets were selected to participate in a competition on the Law of Armed Conflict at the International Institute of Humanitarian Law in Sanremo, Italy.

== See also ==
- Law of the Sea
- Law of Armed Conflict
- Law of land warfare
- Law of occupation
- Command responsibility
- International law
- International Humanitarian Law
- Just war

== Order of precedence ==
Preceded by Canadian Forces Military Police	Legal Branch	Succeeded by Music Branch
