= Royal Canadian Medical Service =

Unified medical branch of the Canadian Armed Forces

- Service de santé royal canadien
- RCMS badge
- Active: 1968–present
- Country: Canada
- Branch: Canadian Forces
- Type: Personnel branch
- Role: Military medicine
- Home station: CFB Borden
- Motto: Militi succurrimus (Latin for 'We hasten to aid the soldiers')
- March: "The Farmer's Boy"

Commanders
- Colonel-in-chief: Anne, Princess Royal

The Royal Canadian Medical Service (RCMS, French: Service de santé royal canadien) is a personnel branch of the Canadian Armed Forces, consisting of all members of medical occupations. Nearly all members of the RCMS, along with the members of the Royal Canadian Dental Corps (RCDC), are employed in the Canadian Forces Health Services Group (CF H Svcs Gp), an operational formation. The RCMS was formerly designated the Canadian Forces Medical Service until it was redesignated on October 9, 2013.

== Motto and march ==
Militi succurrimus (Latin for 'We hasten to aid the soldiers') is the official branch motto. "The Farmer's Boy" is the branch march. This march was selected by Queen Elizabeth The Queen Mother (mother of Queen Elizabeth II).

== Roles and identification ==
Medical personnel of the Canadian Forces provide operational (deployed) and operational readiness (in-garrison) medical care to entitled personnel.

== Uniforms ==
RCMS personnel wear the same uniforms as other members of the Canadian Forces with unique identifiers depending on which distinctive environmental uniform (DEU) they are assigned (Navy, Army, Air Force or CANSOFCOM). Regardless of environment, all officers and non-commissioned members (NCMs) wear the same cap badge. The only difference between the cap badges is that the staff of Aesculapius on NCM badge comprises a gold serpent on a gold staff whereas on the officer badge comprises a silver serpent on a gold staff.

RCMS medical officers who are uniformed in the Navy environment wear scarlet distinction cloth between the braids of their rank insignia, while other health services officer classifications (non-physicians) wear a maroon distinction cloth. NCMs wear a trade badge on their jackets.

RCMS officers and NCMs who are uniformed in Army environment wear an "RCMS" shoulder bar on the service dress jacket, and a tab bearing either the title "RCMS" or a unit identifier (e.g. "25 Fd Amb") on slip-ons for other uniforms. NCMs below the rank of warrant officer wear a trade badge on the sleeve of the service dress jacket.

RCMS officers and non-commissioned members who are uniformed in Air Force environment wear a distinctive silver badge over their name tag on both their dress uniform jacket and short-sleeve order of dress. This badge is a winged staff of Aesculapius.

== History ==
The RCMS has its origins in the Dominion government's 1885 response to the North-West Rebellion, with the appointment of Canada's first Surgeon General, Doctor Darby Bergin of Cornwall, Ontario, and the mobilization of two field hospitals. Permanent medical services for the Canadian Army (1904), Royal Canadian Navy (1910) and Royal Canadian Air Force (1940) were formed separately (years indicated). The three services were subsequently integrated as a single professional/technical organization, the Canadian Forces Medical Service (CFMS), in 1959. Personnel of the CFMS continued to belong to the Navy, Army and Air Force in matters of personnel administration. With the unification of the Canadian Forces (CF) in 1968, medical personnel the RCN, Canadian Army and RCAF were grouped administratively into the new CF Medical Branch, perfectly aligned to the professional/technical organization of the CFMS.

The Medical Service played a significant part in the Canadian expeditionary forces during the First World War and Second World War.

It suffered significant budgetary cutbacks after the 1994 Broadbent Report following the end of the Cold War, with all six of its remaining military hospitals being closed.

The former colonel-in-chief was Queen Elizabeth The Queen Mother (mother of Queen Elizabeth II). The current colonel-in-chief is Princess Anne, Princess Royal (daughter of Elizabeth II and Prince Philip, Duke of Edinburgh)

== Training ==
=== Induction ===
The Medical Officer Training Plan (MOTP) is a CAF programme under which the CAF "will pay successful recruits to complete a recognized Canadian university MD program. This programme covers tuition fees and educational expenses, including books, instruments, supplies, student fees, and registration costs. Family medicine residents and students already enrolled in a recognized programme who successfully screen for enrolment in the CAF are eligible for this training plan. For the duration of their studies and Family Medicine residency, successful members receive full-time salary including medical and dental care, as well as vacation time with full-pay in exchange for working with the CAF for a period of time. Typically, candidates selected for this program attend university during the regular academic year and participate in additional military training during the summer months."

Similar programs exist for other medical roles, including for nurses, paramedics, physician assistants, and laboratory technicians, as well as other roles. These programs vary in length and commitment, but all provide funding for postsecondary education and a salary in exchange for a required term of service following completion of training.

=== School of Operational Medicine ===
The School of Operational Medicine (SOM) in Toronto, Ontario, forms a part of the Canadian Forces Environmental Medicine Establishment. In turn the Canadian Forces Environmental Medicine Establishment is the military component of Defence Research and Development Canada. The School of Operational Medicine (SOM) conducts all flight surgeon training. In addition, it offers courses at various levels in diving medicine to physicians and physician assistants.

=== Canadian Forces Health Service Training Centre ===
The Canadian Forces Health Service Training Centre (CFHSTC), in CFB Borden, is the home station and primary training centre for the Canadian Forces Health Services. The school focuses on all levels of training.

=== Canadian Forces School of Survival and Aeromedical Training ===
The Canadian Forces School of Survival and Aeromedical Training (CFSSAT) in Winnipeg, Manitoba, provides initial and continuation training for all CF aircrew. The training covers diverse topics including life support equipment and human factors, search and evasion as well as disorientation and night vision.

== Order of precedence ==
Preceded by Royal Canadian Logistics Service	Royal Canadian Medical Service	Succeeded by Royal Canadian Dental Corps
