= Régiment du Saguenay =

Le Régiment du Saguenay
- Active: 1900–present
- Country: Canada
- Branch: Canadian Army
- Type: Infantry
- Size: 1 battalion
- Part of: 35 Canadian Brigade Group
- Garrison/HQ: 2578, chemin de la Réserve, Saguenay, Quebec
- Mottos: Dieu et patrie (French for 'God and country')
- March: "Le Régiment du Saguenay"
- Battle honours: Afghanistan
- Website: www.canada.ca/en/army/corporate/2-canadian-division/le-regiment-du-saguenay.html

Le Régiment du Saguenay is a Primary Reserve infantry regiment of the Canadian Forces based in Saguenay, Quebec. The regiment was founded in 1900 in Roberval, Quebec, as the 18th Saguenay Battalion of Infantry.

== Lineage chart ==
Lineage chart

1900	18th "Saguenay" Bn of Infy
1900	18th Saguenay Regt
1909	18th Regt, Francs-tireurs du Saguenay
1920	1st Bn (57th Bn, CEF), Les Francs-tireurs du Saguenay
1920	1st Bn, Les Francs-tireurs du Saguenay
1936	Les Francs-tireurs du Saguenay
1937	Le Rég^{t} du Saguenay
1954	Le Rég^{t} du Saguenay (Mitrailleuses)
1958	Le Rég^{t} du Saguenay

== See also ==
- The Canadian Crown and the Canadian Forces
- Military history of Canada
- History of the Canadian Army
- Canadian Forces

== Order of precedence ==
Preceded by 48th Highlanders of Canada	Le Régiment du Saguenay	Succeeded by The Cape Breton Highlanders
