= Public Affairs Branch (Canadian Forces) =

Unified public affairs branch of the Canadian Armed Forces

- Badge of the Public Affairs Branch
- Active: 1979–present
- Country: Canada
- Branch: Canadian Forces personnel branch
- Role: To inform Canadians of the policies, programs, services, activities, operations and initiatives of the Canadian Forces
- Motto: Veritas (Latin for 'Truth')
- Colours: Black, grey and white
- March: "The Liberty Bell"

The Public Affairs Branch (French: Branche des affaires publiques) is a personnel branch of the Canadian Armed Forces (CAF).

== Mission ==
The mission of the Public Affairs Branch is to inform Canadians of the policies, programs, services, activities, operations and initiatives of the Canadian Armed Forces in a manner that is accurate, complete, objective, timely, relevant, understandable, open and transparent within the law. Public Affairs Officers are assigned to Commands, Formations, and Bases across Canada and are often deployed overseas.

Public Affairs Officers are both line and staff officers who provide advice and professional services to commanders and staffs at the tactical, operational and strategic levels in the areas of:

- Public Affairs planning as part of the operational planning process
- Media operations including media relations services to local, national and international journalists and media outlets, the management of media embedding programs, the conduct of media escorts and the provision of still and video imagery
- Internal communications using a variety of platforms
- Community relations

== Recent history ==
An initiative to improve and enhance military Public Affairs and military strategic communications more broadly began in 2015. This effort sought to have public affairs officers become directly involved in information activities including the possibility of deception and psychological operations against Canadians and Allies, with positions created for information operations and psychological operations staff reporting to Jay Janzen - a brigadier-general, now retired - the senior military public affairs officer at the time. The Military Public Affairs Enhancement and Employment Concept (MPAEEC) set out the reasons for change and vision for the Branch, explaining that the current construct "lacks the proper readiness to effectively support overseas operations", and noted five deficiencies of the public affairs function and officers within: insufficient military culture, expertise and readiness; reactive, rather than strategic-driven engagement; ineffectual management of visual communications; lack of innovation; and insufficient [Canadian Armed Forces] capacity and mindsets.

The situation was described as a consequence of structural changes over time within the Assistant Deputy Minister Public Affairs organization that put emphasis on civilian rather than military practitioners, and "led to a dilution of military culture and a lack of focus on martial imperatives. In recent years it has been difficult to distinguish the difference in roles between the civilian and CAF communications, leading to a corporate mindset among some [Public Affairs Officers] and Image Techs." The initiative was stood down in December 2020 by the Chief of the Defence Staff General Jonathan Vance, and its personnel re-assigned.

In June 2021, then-acting Chief of the Defence Staff General Wayne Eyre and Deputy Minister Jody Thomas, determined that "the effort to expand the formal range of duties of Public Affairs Officers into the [Information Operations/Influence Activity] domain, including the draft [MPAEEC] paper, were incompatible with Government of Canada Communications Policy, and the DND/CAF vision, mission and principles of Public Affairs." The senior leaders also acknowledged "it is clear that the development of the various information-related capabilities have suffered from a lack of institution-wide strategic level direction and guidance ... governed by appropriate authorities and oversight."

In May 2022, a history of the initiative titled "The Rise and Fall of Military Strategic Communications at National Defence 2015-2021: A Cautionary Tale for Canada and NATO, and a Roadmap for Reform" was published by the Canadian Global Affairs Institute.

== Order of precedence ==
Preceded by Training Development Branch	Public Affairs Branch	Succeeded by Intelligence Branch
