= Auprès de ma blonde =

17th century chanson

"Auprès de ma blonde" (French for "Next to My Girl") or "Le Prisonnier de Hollande" ("The Prisoner of Holland") is a popular chanson dating to the 17th century. The song tells the story of a woman who laments to the birds in her father's garden that her husband is a prisoner in Holland. It appeared during or soon after the Franco-Dutch War (1672–78), during the reign of Louis XIV, when French sailors and soldiers were commonly imprisoned in the Netherlands.

The song's quick pace and lively melody made it well-suited to military marches, and it is still commonly played at parades. For the same reasons, it gained widespread popularity as a drinking song and nursery rhyme.

== History ==
The song was composed in 1704 during the reign of Louis XIV. A local tradition attributes the composition to André Joubert du Collet.
