= Royal Canadian Dental Corps =

Unified dental branch of the Canadian Armed Forces

- Active: 1939–present
- Country: Canada
- Branch: Canadian Armed Forces
- Size: 1 headquarters and 26 detachments in Canada and Europe. Personnel from 1 Dental Unit are also posted to 1 Field Ambulance in Edmonton, 2 Field Ambulance in Petawawa, 5 Field Ambulance in Valcartier and 1 Canadian Field Hospital in Petawawa, ON.
- Motto: Sanitas in ore (Latin for 'oral health')
- March: Quick: "March Past of the Royal Canadian Dental Corps"; Slow: "Greensleeves"

Commanders
- Colonel-in-Chief: Birgitte, Duchess of Gloucester
- Notable commanders: Colonel John A Armstrong (1915-1919); Brigadier General William R Thompson (1976-1982); Brigadier General Victor J Lanctis (1993-1996)

The Royal Canadian Dental Corps (RCDC, French: Corps dentaire royal canadien) is a personnel branch of the Canadian Armed Forces (CAF). Most members of RCDC, along with the members of the Royal Canadian Medical Service, are employed in the Canadian Forces Health Services Group (CF H Svcs Gp) within the Military Personnel Command reporting to the Chief of Military Personnel. All members of RCDC wear Army uniform. The branch was first raised in 1915 as the Canadian Army Dental Corps and was known from 1947 until 1968 as The Royal Canadian Dental Corps. From 1968 to 2013 the branch was previously named the Dental Branch.

1 Dental Unit is composed of military and civilian personnel providing dental care to the Canadian Armed Forces in both garrison and while deployed overseas.

== History ==
General Order No 63 was issued on 13 May 1915, authorizing the Canadian Army Dental Corps (CADC) as a separate corps. In anticipation of this general order, on 29 March 1915 authorization was published to appoint "one officer in charge of all dental surgeons, to be attached to divisional headquarters …, to be designated 'Chief Dental Surgeon' as well as an establishment of dental officers for brigades, divisions, base hospitals and field ambulances. This provided a war-time establishment for the new CADC, with a lieutenant-colonel Chief Dental Surgeon for each division. A few days later Colonel John Alexander Armstrong was promoted, named the Director of Dental Services, and assigned to Canadian Corps Headquarters in London."

After the Second World War, a series of coloured berets were adopted, with other arms and services wearing midnight blue berets, with a large coloured "flash" in corps colours – emerald green for the Royal Canadian Dental Corps.

The NCMs of the RCDC were composed of four specific trades. Dental technicians, dental hygienists, dental laboratory technicians and dental equipment repair technicians. After numerous cutbacks and restructuring, only dental technicians and dental hygienists remain. Laboratory services (fabrication of crowns, bridges, dentures, etc.) are sent out for fabrication at numerous civilian dental labs across the country. Minor equipment repairs are done in house by dental technicians, all major repairs and routine maintenance and warranty work is completed by civilian companies who compete for the contract to maintain the equipment. While deployed, the dental technicians and biomedical equipment technicians work to keep equipment functioning.

=== Unification ===
When the Army, Royal Canadian Navy, and Royal Canadian Air Force were merged in 1968 to form the Canadian Forces, the Royal Canadian Dental Corps and Royal Canadian Army Medical Corps were deactivated and merged with their naval and air force counterparts to form the Dental Branch and the Canadian Forces Medical Service of the Canadian Forces Health Services Group (CF H Svcs Gp). The rifle green beret was adopted as the CF standard.

An announcement dated 9 October 2013 revived the title Royal Canadian Dental Corps for the Dental Branch of the Canadian Armed Forces. "The bestowing and restoration of the Canadian Forces Health Services historical names is an essential part of the government's commitment to honour the memories of so many brave Canadians who have sacrificed in service to Canada," said Rob Nicholson, Minister of National Defence. "It reinstates an important and recognizable part of our military heritage, as well as a key part of our nation's identity."

== Alliances ==
This unit was allied with the following:

- United Kingdom – Royal Army Medical Service
- Australia – Royal Australian Army Dental Corps
- New Zealand – Royal New Zealand Dental Corps

== Order of precedence ==
Preceded by Royal Canadian Medical Service	Royal Canadian Dental Corps	Succeeded by Corps of Royal Canadian Electrical and Mechanical Engineers
