= Naval Operations Branch =

- Active: 1968–present
- Country: Canada
- Branch: Canadian Armed Forces
- Type: Personnel branch
- Role: Sea-going trades of the Canadian Armed Forces
- March: "Heart of Oak"

The Naval Operations Branch (French: Branche des opérations navales) is a personnel branch of the Canadian Forces. The branch consists of most of the seagoing occupations and trades of the Royal Canadian Navy.

Members of the branch wear an embroidered cap badge usually featuring a fouled anchor, though the exact badge depends on the wearer's rank and position.

== Training ==
=== Naval Officers Training Centre (NOTC) ===
HMCS Venture, the Naval Officers Training Centre (NOTC), is at Work Point in CFB Esquimalt, in Esquimalt, British Columbia. The role of the NOTC is to encompass all aspects of junior naval officer training and development.

== Order of precedence ==
Preceded by None. First in precedence of personnel branches	Naval Operations Branch	Succeeded by Royal Canadian Horse Artillery or Army elements of Royal Military College of Canada (see note below)

Note: When parading with their guns, the honour of "The Right of the Line" (precedence over other Army units) is held by the units of the Royal Canadian Horse Artillery; otherwise, the Naval Operations Branch is succeeded immediately by formed bodies of Officer Cadets of the Royal Military College of Canada representing their college.
