= Royal Canadian Logistics Service =

Unified logistics branch of the Canadian Armed Forces

- Service royal de la logistique du Canada (French)
- Active: 1968–present
- Country: Canada
- Branch: Canadian Armed Forces
- Type: Military logistics
- Role: Supply chain management, transportation, human resource management, finance, food services, postal and ammunition
- Home Station: CFB Borden
- Motto: Servitium nulli secundus (Latin for 'service second to none')
- March: "March of the Logistics Branch"
- Anniversaries: 1 February 1968

Insignia
- Flag

The Royal Canadian Logistics Service (RCLS, French: Service royal de la logistique du Canada) is a personnel branch of the Canadian Armed Forces (CAF).

In April 1997, the CF Armed Forces Council decided to incorporate the Personnel Administration Branch into the Logistics Branch.

From 1968 to 2018 the organization was named the Logistics Branch. On October 16, 2018, on the occasion on its 50th anniversary, the Logistics Branch received its "Royal" designation from Queen Elizabeth II becoming the Royal Canadian Logistics Service.

== Unification ==
When the Canadian Army, Royal Canadian Navy, and Royal Canadian Air Force were merged in 1968 to form the Canadian Armed Forces, the administrative corps of the Canadian Army were deactivated and merged with their naval and air force counterparts to ultimately form the Canadian Forces Logistics Branch.

- The Royal Canadian Army Service Corps transport and supply elements were combined with the Royal Canadian Ordnance Corps to form the Logistics Branch
- The Royal Canadian Postal Corps and Royal Canadian Army Service Corps clerical trades were merged to form the Administration Branch (later merged with the Logistics Branch)

== Uniform ==
The officers that belong to the corps wear a metallic embroidered or composite cap badge, while the non-commissioned members (NCM) wear a cloth-like version on berets and Air Force wedge caps; however, Navy NCMs wear a solid-metal version on their service caps and bowlers.

== Training ==
=== Canadian Forces Logistics Training Centre ===
Canadian Forces Logistics Training Centre (CFLTC) (formerly known as Canadian Forces School of Administration and Logistics or CFSAL), located at Canadian Forces Base Borden, has an establishment of 181 military and 5 civilian personnel and is organized into a headquarters and six divisions:

- Supply and Food Service Training Division;
- Financial and Human Resources Training Division;
- Transportation and Traffic Training Division;
- Postal Training Cadre (CFB Trenton);
- Music Training Division;
- Explosives Training Division; and
- Logistics Leadership Division, which oversees Officer and Advanced Training.

Each year, CFLTC trains approximately 4,500 military members (both Regular and Reserve Force) and civilians. CFLTC provides entry-level and college-level training to logistics officers from all three environments ranging from the ranks of Lieutenant to Major. In addition, CFLTC trains the following sub-occupations for logistics officers: supply chain management, financial management, human resources management, fleet management and food services.

CFLTC trains the following occupations for non-commissioned members: human resources administrator, financial service administrator, cook, material management technician, ammunition technician, traffic technician, mobile support equipment operator, and musician.

"Anytime, Anywhere" is the officially recognized military march of the Canadian Forces Logistics Training Centre. This march was written by Michael Lett of the Central Band of the Canadian Armed Forces and officially recognized by the Directorate of History and Heritage on 17 February 2021. The title was one of several proposed titles and voted on by the staff at CFLTC at a mess dinner.

== Order of precedence ==
Preceded by Air Operations Branch	Royal Canadian Logistics Service	Succeeded by Royal Canadian Medical Service
