= Canadian Armed Forces ranks and insignia =

This is a table of the ranks and insignia of the Canadian Armed Forces. As the Canadian Armed Forces is officially bilingual, the French language ranks are presented following the English (in italics).

== Commander-in-chief insignia ==
According to Canadian Forces Dress Instructions, the king's representative (the governor general) may wear the uniform and corresponding cap/hat badge of a flag/general officer, with a special flag/general officer sleeve braid embellished with the governor general's badge, and a large embroidered governor general's badge on the shoulder straps, facing forward.

Service	Board	Sleeve
Royal Canadian Navy
Canadian Army
Royal Canadian Air Force

== Commissioned officer ranks ==
The rank insignia of commissioned officers.

Officers in the CAF hold positions of authority and respect. They are responsible for the safety, well-being and morale of a group of soldiers, sailors, or aviators. Analyzing, planning, making decisions and providing advice are a few aspects of an Officer’s role.

NATO code	OF-10	OF-9	OF-8	OF-7	OF-6	OF-5	OF-4	OF-3	OF-2	OF-1
Royal Canadian Navy
Royal Canadian Navy		Admiral	Vice-admiral	Rear-admiral	Commodore	Captain (N)	Commander	Lieutenant-commander	Lieutenant (N)	Sub-lieutenant	Acting sub-lieutenant
Royal Canadian Navy		Amiral(e)	Vice-amiral(e)	Contre-amiral(e)	Commodore	Capitaine de vaisseau	Capitaine de frégate	Capitaine de corvette	Lieutenant(e) de vaisseau	Enseigne de vaisseau de 1^{re} classe	Enseigne de vaisseau de 2^{e} classe
Canadian Army
Canadian Army		General	Lieutenant-general	Major-general	Brigadier-general	Colonel	Lieutenant-colonel	Major	Captain	Lieutenant	Second lieutenant
Canadian Army		Général(e)	Lieutenant(e)-général(e)	Major(e)-général(e)	Brigadier(ère)-général(e)	Colonel(le)	Lieutenant(e)-colonel(le)	Major(e)	Capitaine	Lieutenant(e)	Sous-lieutenant(e)
Royal Canadian Air Force
Royal Canadian Air Force		General	Lieutenant-general	Major-general	Brigadier-general	Colonel	Lieutenant-colonel	Major	Captain	Lieutenant	Second lieutenant
Royal Canadian Air Force		Général(e)	Lieutenant(e)-général(e)	Major(e)-général(e)	Brigadier(ère)-général(e)	Colonel(le)	Lieutenant(e)-colonel(le)	Major(e)	Capitaine	Lieutenant(e)	Sous-lieutenant(e)
NATO code	OF-10	OF-9	OF-8	OF-7	OF-6	OF-5	OF-4	OF-3	OF-2	OF-1

Army general gorget

Army colonel gorget

=== Subordinate officer ranks ===
Branch	Navy	Army	Air force
Insignia
English	Naval cadet	Officer cadet	Officer cadet
French	Aspirant(e) de marine	Élève-officier(ère)	Élève-officier(ère)

== Non-commissioned member (NCM) ranks ==
The following are the rank insignia for non-commissioned members for the navy, army and air force respectively.

Non-commissioned members are skilled personnel who provide operational and support services in the CAF. Non-Commissioned Members start out as recruits and are trained to do specific jobs.

NCM rank insignia for the rank of petty officer 1st class/warrant officer and above are worn on the lower sleeve, while those for the rank of petty officer 2nd class/sergeant and below are worn on the upper sleeve. The Royal Canadian Navy has directed its personnel to use the English rank titles for OR-1 through OR-5, but they are not yet legally in force pursuant to the National Defence Act, as they are not yet updated in the King's Regulations and Orders issued by the governor-in-council.

NATO code	OR-9	OR-8	OR-7	OR-6	OR-5	OR-4	OR-3	OR-2	OR-1
Royal Canadian Navy									No insignia
Royal Canadian Navy	Chief petty officer 1st class	Chief petty officer 2nd class	Petty officer 1st class	Petty officer 2nd class		Master sailor	Sailor 1st class	Sailor 2nd class	Sailor 3rd class
Royal Canadian Navy	Premier(ère) maître de 1^{re} classe	Premier(ère) maître de 2^{e} classe	Maître de 1^{re} classe	Maître de 2^{e} classe		Matelot-chef	Matelot de 1^{re} classe	Matelot de 2^{e} classe	Matelot de 3^{e} classe
Canadian Army									No insignia
Canadian Army	Chief warrant officer	Master warrant officer	Warrant officer	Sergeant		Master corporal	Corporal	Private (trained)	Private (basic)
Canadian Army	Adjudant(e)-chef	Adjudant(e)-maître	Adjudant(e)	Sergent(e)		Caporal(e)-chef	Caporal(e)	Soldat(e) (formé(e))	Soldat(e) (confirmé(e))
Royal Canadian Air Force									No insignia
Royal Canadian Air Force	Chief warrant officer	Master warrant officer	Warrant officer	Sergeant		Master corporal	Corporal	Aviator (trained)	Aviator (basic)
Royal Canadian Air Force	Adjudant(e)-chef	Adjudant(e)-maître	Adjudant(e)	Sergent(e)		Caporal(e)-chef	Caporal(e)	Aviateur (formé)/ Aviatrice (formée)	Aviateur (confirmé)/ Aviatrice (confirmée)
NATO code	OR-9	OR-8	OR-7	OR-6	OR-5	OR-4	OR-3	OR-2	OR-1

=== Appointments ===
The rank insignia for NCM appointments.

Rank group	Senior appointments			Appointments
Royal Canadian Navy
Royal Canadian Navy	Canadian forces chief warrant officer	Command chief petty officer	Senior appointment Chief petty officer, 1st class	Drum major	Pipe major	Trumpet / bugle major
Royal Canadian Navy	Adjudant(e)-chef des Forces canadiennes	Premier(ère) maître de 1^{re} classe du commandement	Premier(ère) maître de 1^{re} classe	Tambour-major	Cornemuseur-major	Trompette / clairon-major
Canadian Army
Canadian Army	Canadian forces chief warrant officer	Command chief warrant officer	Senior appointment chief warrant officer	Drum major	Pipe major	Trumpet / bugle major
Canadian Army	Adjudant(e)-chef des Forces canadiennes	Adjudant(e)-chef du commandement	Adjudant(e)-chef nomination supérieure	Tambour-major	Cornemuseur-major	Trompette / clairon-major
Royal Canadian Air Force
Royal Canadian Air Force	Canadian forces chief warrant officer	Command chief warrant officer	Senior Appointment; Chief warrant officer	Drum major	Pipe major	Trumpet / bugle major
Royal Canadian Air Force	Adjudant(e)-chef des Forces canadiennes	Adjudant(e)-chef du commandement	Adjudant(e)-chef nomination supérieure	Tambour-major	Cornemuseur-major	Trompette / clairon-major
Rank group	Senior appointments			Appointments

== Rank slip-ons ==
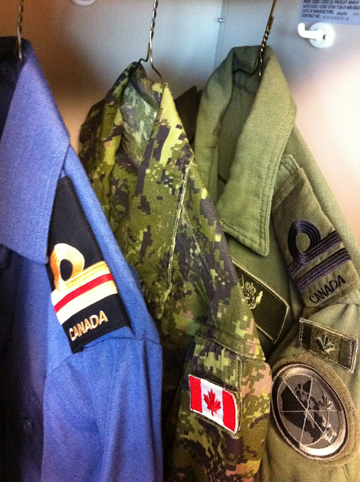
Three operational dress uniforms of the Canadian Forces, showing the two styles of slip-on worn by the Royal Canadian Navy. The red fabric between the two rows of braid indicates a medical officer; the navies of some other Commonwealth realms also use red stripes to denote a medical officer.

The tables above describe the rank insignia worn on the service dress jacket. On DEU shirts, sweaters, and outerwear; and operational dress shirts and jackets, rank insignia are worn on slip-ons with the word "Canada" or a regimental/branch title embroidered underneath. Flag/general officers' slip-ons include only the crown, crossed sabre and baton, and maple leaves worn on the shoulder straps; they do not include the braid worn on the sleeve. Army NCM slip-ons for DEU shirts, sweaters, and outerwear display only the word "Canada" or a regimental/branch title, rank insignia being worn instead as enamelled metal pins on collar points or lapels.

In the Canadian Forces, slip-ons displaying rank insignia and shoulder titles are worn on the shoulder straps of the No. 3 Service Dress shirt, overcoat, raincoat, and sweater; CANEX parka and windbreaker; Naval Combat Dress jacket and shirt; flying suits and flying jackets; and Military Police Operational Patrol Dress shirt and jacket. The slip-ons are worn on a similar-style strap located in the centre of the chest (and sometimes centre of the back as well) of the CADPAT shirt, jacket, parka, and raincoat. Slip-ons are not worn on the Service Dress jacket, or with Mess Dress.

Canadian Forces slip-ons
Uniform	Base fabric	Officers' rank insignia	Non-commissioned members' rank insignia	Shoulder titles
Navy Service Dress	Navy Blue (which is a tone of black)	Rows of gold rank braid	Embroidered in "CF Gold" thread	"CANADA", embroidered in "CF Gold" thread, only for NCMs. Officers have "CANADA" marks as shoulder flashes.
Army Service Dress	Rifle green	Embroidered in full colour, including branch-specific backing colour	None (rank insignia are worn on enameled pins on lapels or collar points)	Regimental or branch title, or the word "CANADA", in "CF gold" cotton thread
Air Force Service Dress	Air Force blue	Rows of "pearl grey" (silver) and black rank braid	Embroidered in "pearl grey" (silver) thread	"CANADA", embroidered in "pearl grey" (silver) thread
Naval Combat Dress and Naval Enhanced Combat Uniform - not a slip-on for NECU, but velcro-backed patch	Navy Blue	Rows of gold rank braid	Embroidered in "CF Gold" thread	"CANADA", embroidered in "CF Gold" thread
Navy CADPAT TW (Temperate Woodland)	Olive green	Embroidered in black thread	Embroidered in black thread	"CANADA", embroidered in black thread
Army CADPAT TW	CADPAT TW	Embroidered in "high visibility" silver thread	Embroidered in "high visibility" silver thread	"CANADA" or an applicable branch, regimental, or air unit title embroidered in "high visibility" silver thread
Air Force CADPAT TW and flying suit	Olive green	Embroidered in blue thread	Embroidered in blue thread	"CANADA" or an applicable branch, regimental, or air unit title embroidered in blue thread
Navy, Army, and Air Force CADPAT AR (Arid Region)	CADPAT AR	Embroidered in tan thread	Embroidered in tan thread	"CANADA" or an applicable branch, regimental, or air unit title embroidered in tan thread
Former uniforms
Olive green combat uniform (replaced by CADPAT in the early 2000s)	Olive green	Embroidered in light olive green thread	Embroidered in light olive green thread (Note: More often, the non-commissioned member's rank was issued in the form of a patch that was either stitched onto the epaulet (preferred Air Force and Navy practice) or directly onto the upper shirt or jacket sleeve with the slip-on left blank (preferred Army practice).)	"CANADA" or an applicable branch, regimental, or air unit title embroidered in light olive green thread
Air Force Service Dress prior to 2015	Air Force blue	Rows of gold rank braid	Embroidered in "Old Gold" thread (darker in colour than "CF Gold")	"CANADA", embroidered in "CF Gold" thread

== Service stripes ==
From 1955 to 1968, Militia personnel were permitted to wear service insignia on the right jacket sleeve. There were one to five silver chevrons on drab backing for every two years of service or a maple leaf in silver thread on a drab cloth circle to represent 10 years of service. Chevron points were worn either up or down; even official documents and photos were confused on the matter. Further awards after 10 years were believed covered by the Canadian Forces' Decoration, which was awarded after 12 years and a clasp added for every 10 years afterwards.

Qualifying service could include prior active service in the active reserves of the Royal Canadian Navy and Royal Canadian Air Force or the regular or territorial forces of a fellow Commonwealth member nation. Service in Canadian Army reserve forces units (like the regular reserve, supplementary reserve and reserve militia) did not count. The awarding of Service Stripes ceased in 1968 after the unification of the Canadian Armed Forces.

== Canadian Army distinctive corps insignia ==
Every branch or corps of the Canadian Army uses a distinctive colour. Applicable only to officers, they are indicated by coloured borders of rank insignia on DEU shirt and sweater slip-ons and on mess dress.

Branch	Colour	Image
Royal Canadian Armoured Corps	Yellow	
Royal Regiment of Canadian Artillery; Canadian Forces Military Police; Public Affairs Branch; Royal Canadian Logistics Service	Red	
Corps of Royal Canadian Engineers; Royal Canadian Corps of Signals; Corps of Royal Canadian Electrical and Mechanical Engineers	Blue	
Royal Canadian Infantry Corps (RCIC) (except rifle regiments); Officers of the General List; Cadet Instructors Cadre	Scarlet	
Royal Canadian Medical Service	Dull cherry	
Canadian Intelligence Corps	Forest green (silver rank)	
Royal Canadian Dental Corps	Emerald green	
Royal Canadian Chaplain Service	Purple	
RCIC members of Les Voltigeurs de Québec	Black	

=== Distinctive rank names ===
Some branches and regiments use distinctive job titles for privates (trained) in those regiments:

Branch	Distinct title
Royal Canadian Armoured Corps	Trooper (cavalier or cavalière)
Royal Regiment of Canadian Artillery	Gunner (artilleur or artilleuse)
Corps of Royal Canadian Engineers	Sapper (sapeur or sapeuse)
Royal Canadian Corps of Signals	Signaller (signaleur or signaleuse)
Corps of Royal Canadian Electrical and Mechanical Engineers	Craftsman (artisan or artisane)
Royal Canadian Infantry Corps (RCIC) members of guards regiments	Guardsman (garde)
RCIC members of rifle regiments	Rifleman (carabinier or carabinière)
RCIC members of fusilier regiments	Fusilier (fusilier or fusilière)
RCIC members of voltigeur regiment	Voltigeur (voltigeur or voltigeuse)
Musicians of the Music Branch	Musician (musicien or musicienne)
Pipers of the Music Branch	Piper (cornemuseur or cornemuseuse)
Drummers of the Music Branch	Drummer (batteur or batteuse)
Canadian Rangers	Ranger (ranger)

Additionally, the Royal Regiment of Canadian Artillery uses "bombardier" (bombardier or bombardière) for corporal and "master bombardier" (bombardier-chef or bombardière-chef) for master corporal. In the guards regiments, warrant officers are known as "colour sergeants" (sergents fourriers) and second-lieutenants are known as "ensigns" (enseignes).

== Evolution of Royal Canadian Navy rank and insignia ==
When the Royal Canadian Navy was established in 1910, it kept with Royal Navy traditions and adopted sleeve braid with an executive curl for rank insignia. "Wavy" sleeve braid was adopted for the Royal Canadian Naval Volunteer Reserve (RCNVR) and rings of narrow interwoven gold lace for the Royal Canadian Navy Reserve (RCNR). Other variations in rank insignia included sky blue lace with a diamond shaped loop for officers of the Women's Royal Canadian Naval Service, and warranted Royal Canadian Sea Cadet Corps officers, who had a small anchor in place of the executive curl.

Following the Second World War, the Royal Canadian Navy was reorganized with a single reserve component. In 1946, the distinctive wavy gold braid of the reserves gave way to the straight braided executive curl of the regular force until 1968. With the integration of the Canadian Forces the sea element was designated as Canadian Forces Maritime Command. Unembellished straight braid became the common rank insignia for officers of both the regular and reserve forces. The executive curl appeared only on navy mess dress.

On 5 March 2010, the Canadian House of Commons passed a motion (moved by Guy Lauzon) recommending the executive curl be reinstated on the Canadian navy uniform. Subsequently, in recognition of the Canadian Naval centennial, Peter MacKay, Minister of National Defence, authorized the use of the executive curl for the Canadian Navy on 2 May 2010. The insignia became effective on 11 June 2010, on the occasion of the Pacific Canadian Naval International Fleet Review parade of nations in Victoria, B.C.

More than 54 countries, including Canada and 18 other of the 22 Commonwealth navies, use the insignia. Most navies that do not use the executive curl insignia, such as the United States Navy and the French Navy, substitute a star or other national device above the top row of lace.

=== Timeline of changes (sleeves only) ===
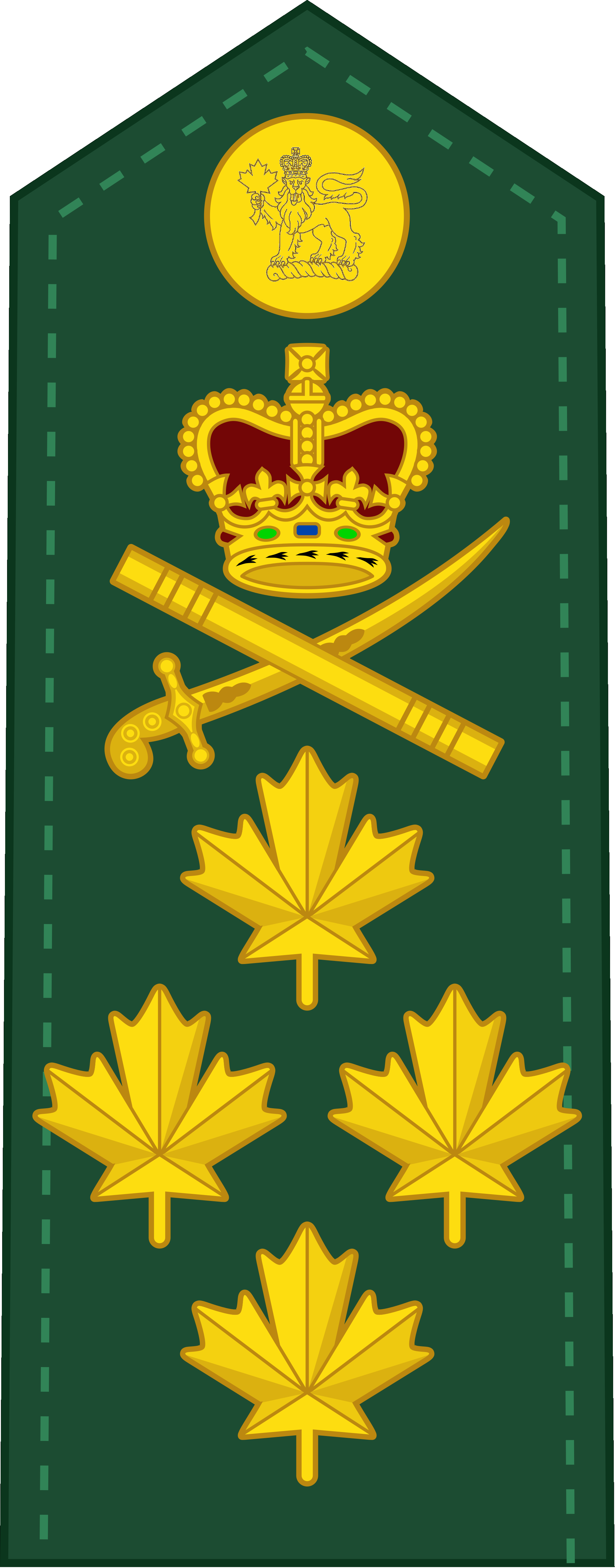
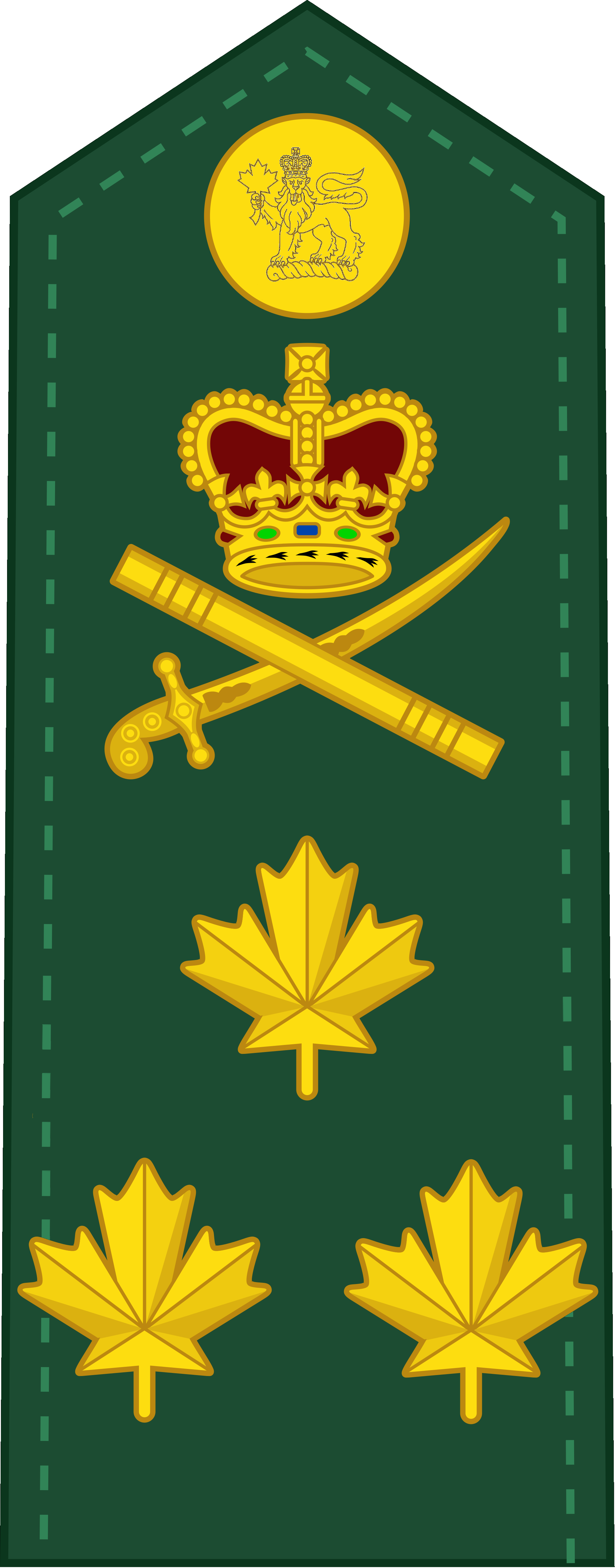
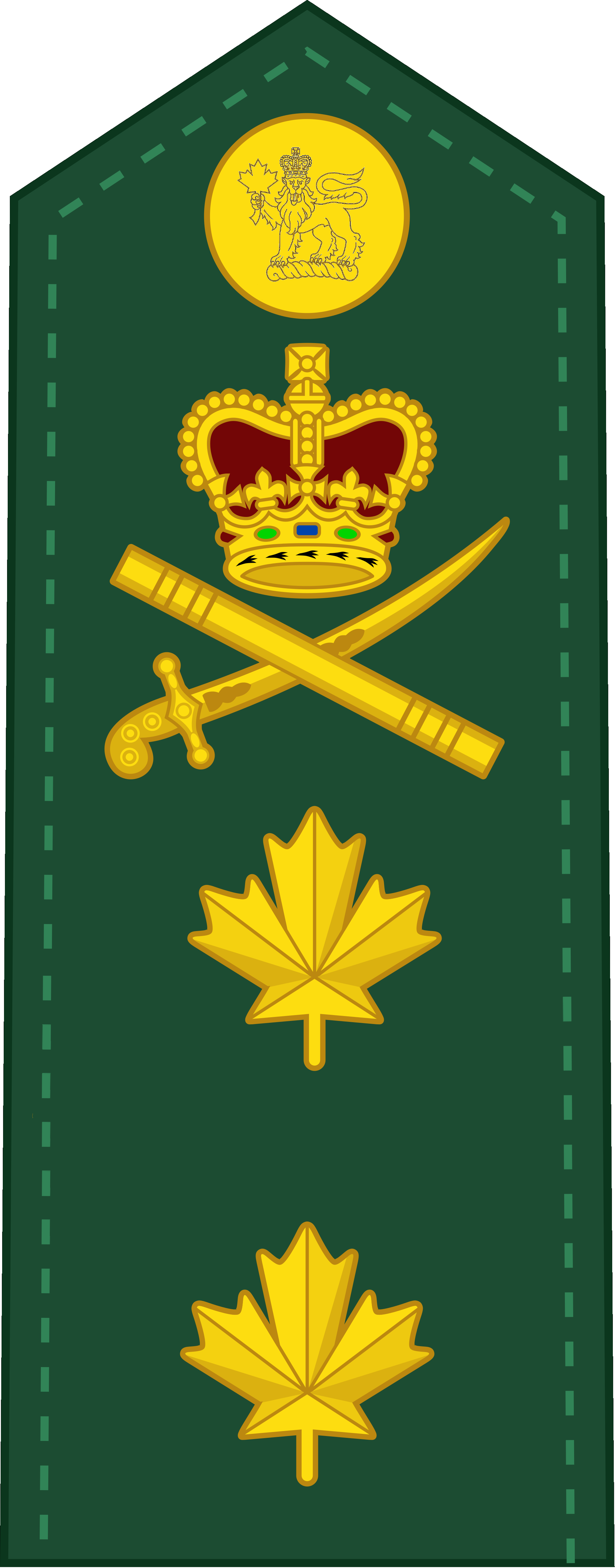
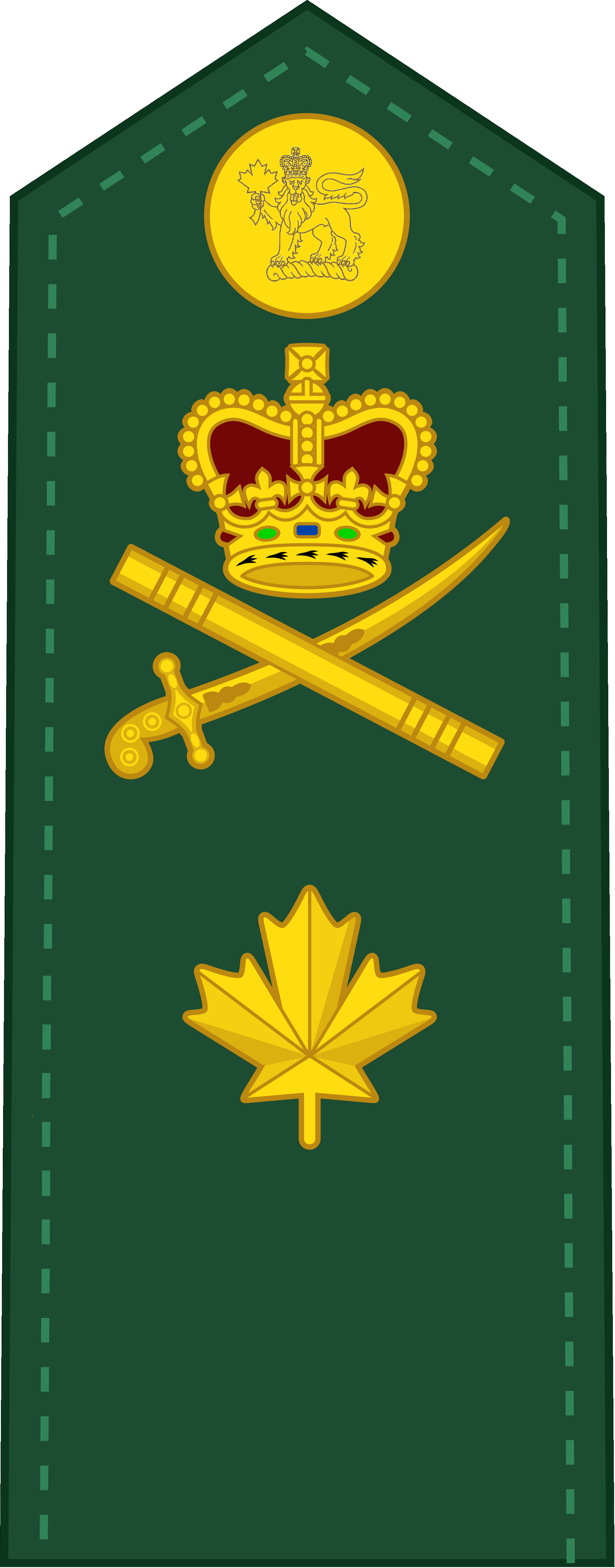
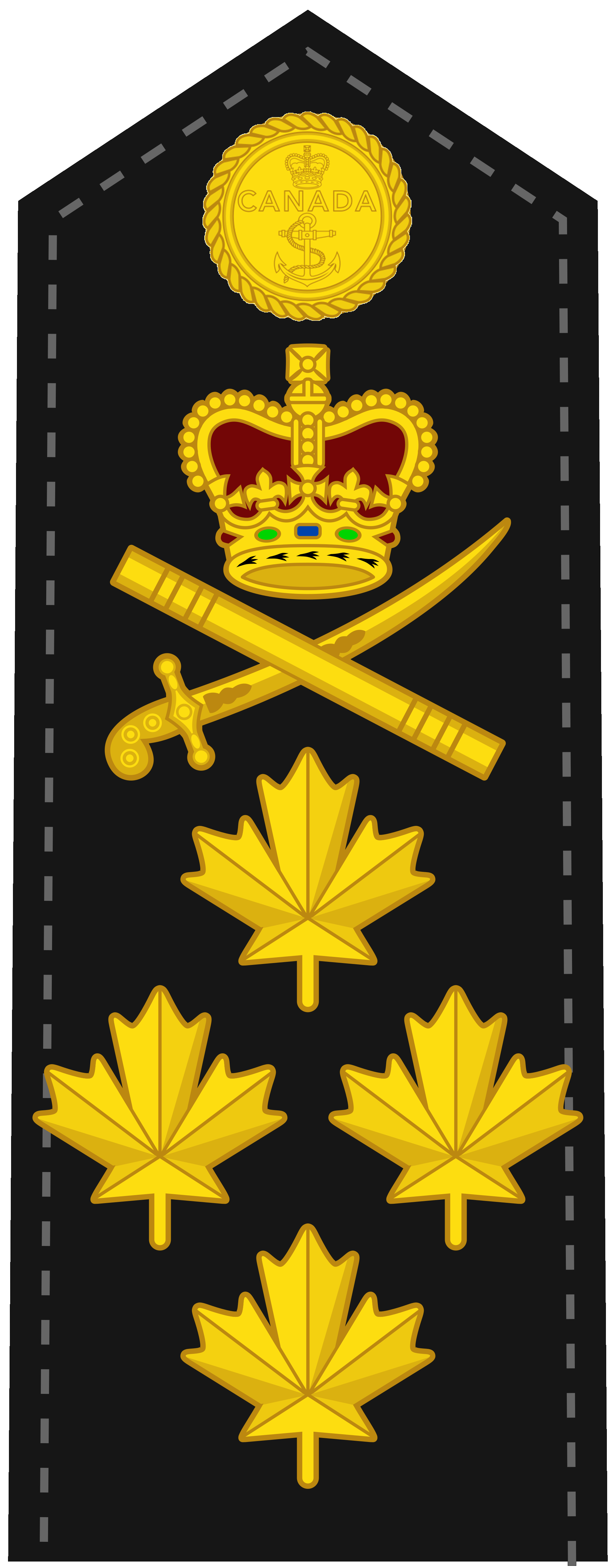
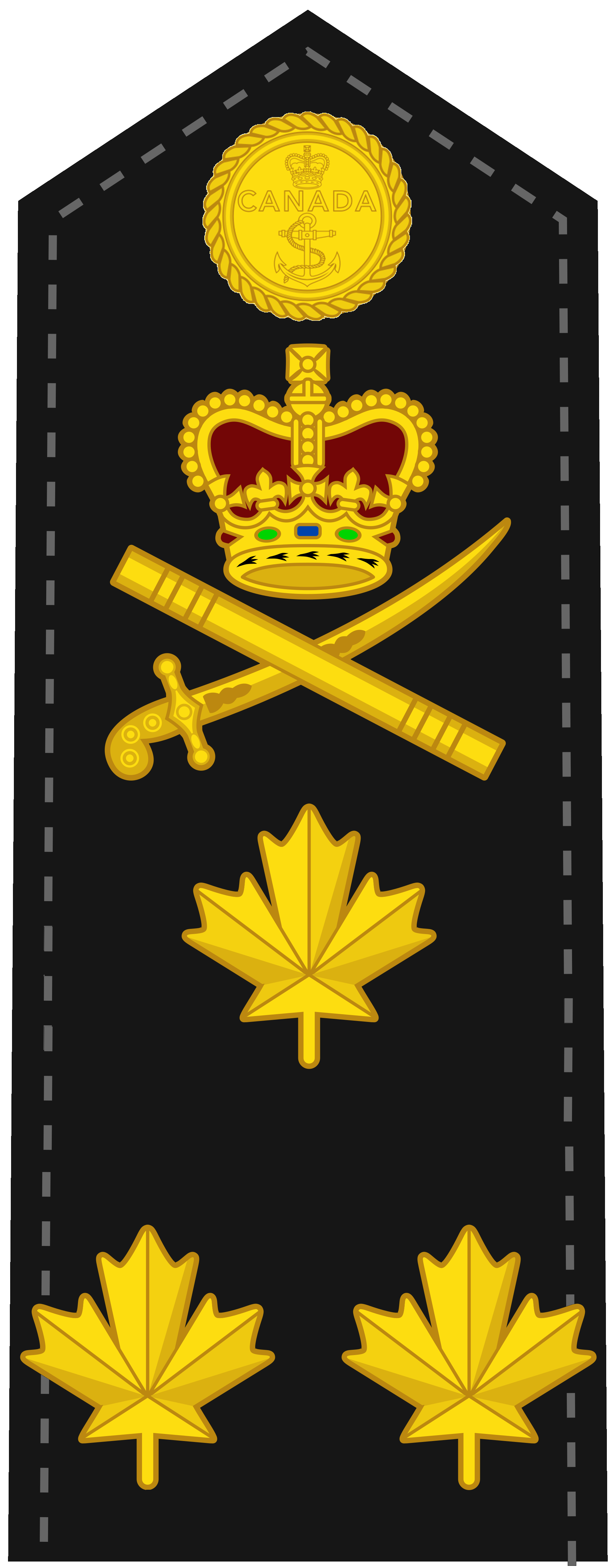
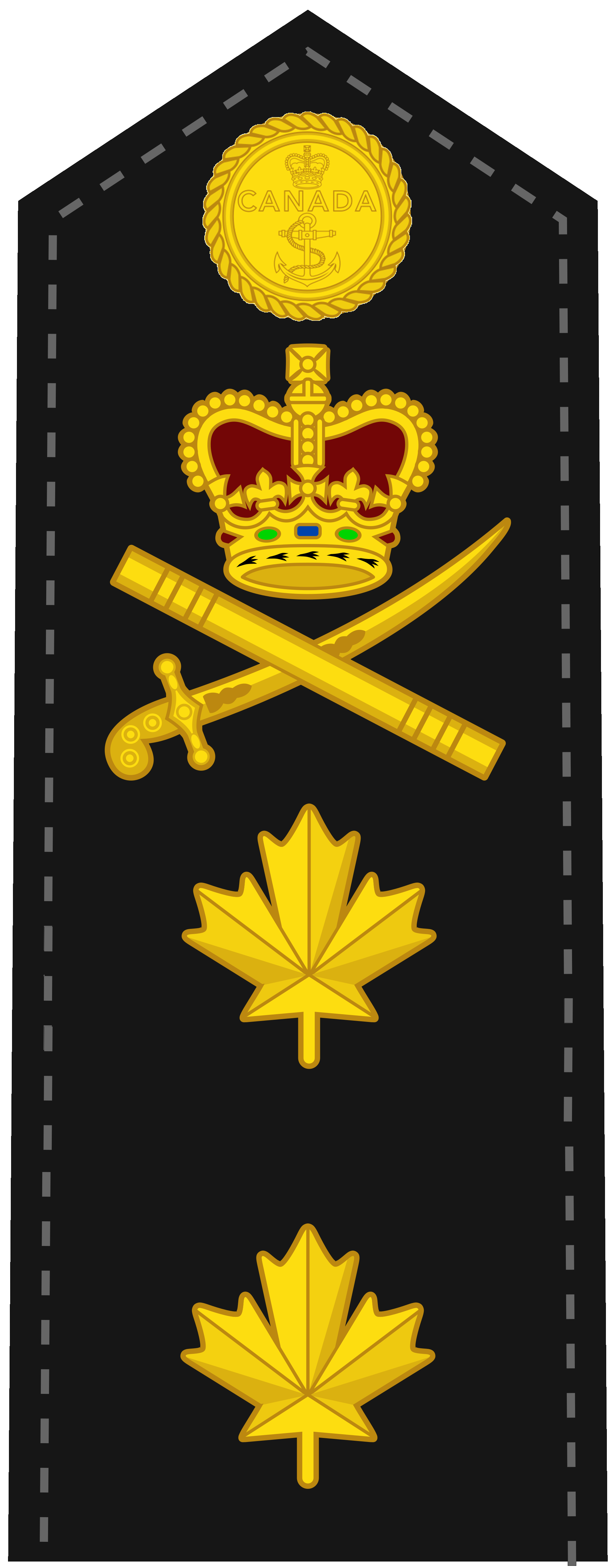
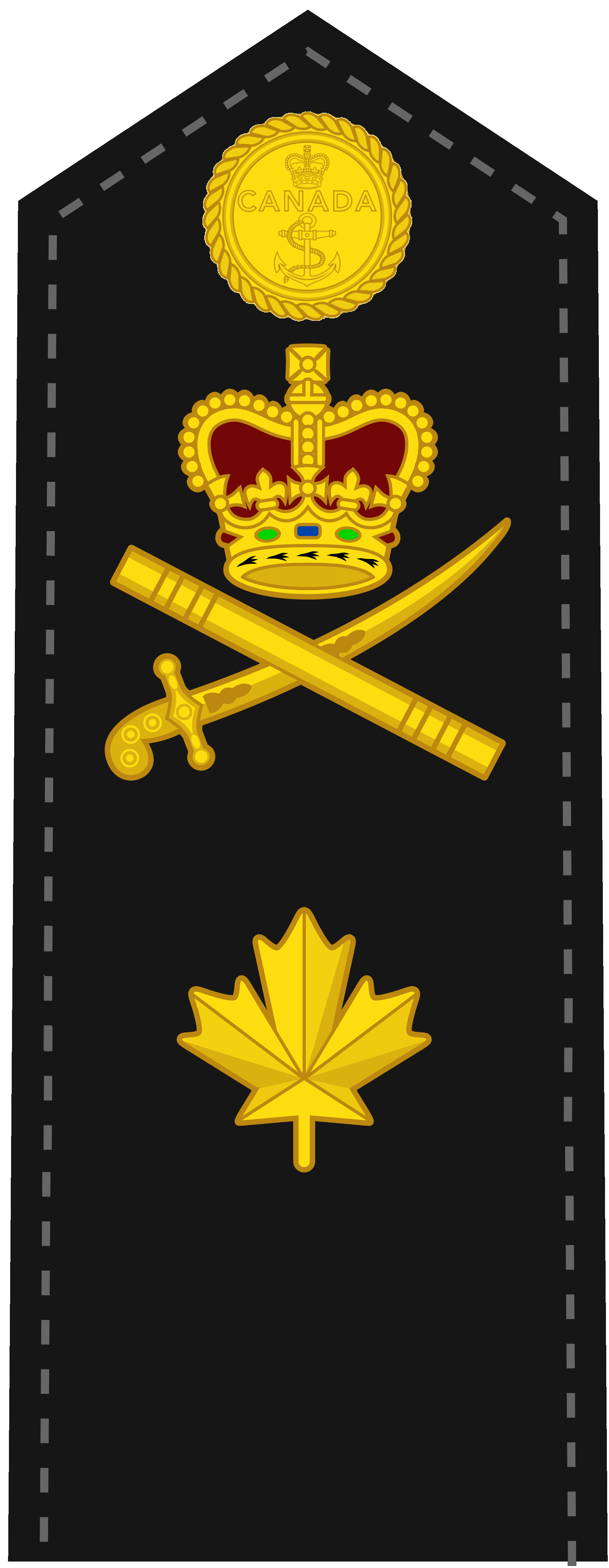
Rank group	General / flag officers					Senior officers			Junior officers
Royal Canadian Navy (1910–1968)
Maritime Command (1968–1985)
Maritime Command (1985–2010)
Royal Canadian Navy (2011–Present)
Rank titles		Admiral	Vice-admiral	Rear-admiral	Commodore	Captain(N)	Commander	Lieutenant-commander	Lieutenant(N)	Sub-lieutenant	Acting sub-lieutenant	Naval cadet
Rank titles		Amiral or Amirale	Vice-amiral or Vice-amirale	Contre-amiral or Contre-amirale	Commodore	Capitaine de vaisseau	Capitaine de frégate	Capitaine de corvette	Lieutenant de vaisseau or Lieutenante de vaisseau	Enseigne de vaisseau de première classe	Enseigne de vaisseau de deuxième classe	Aspirant de marine or Aspirante de marine
NATO code	OF-10	OF-9	OF-8	OF-7	OF-6	OF-5	OF-4	OF-3	OF-2	OF-1

Rank group	Senior NCOs					Junior NCOs		Enlisted
Royal Canadian Navy (1953–1968)							Trade badge	No insignia	No insignia
Royal Canadian Navy (1953–1968)	Chief petty officer 1st class Premier maître de 1^{re} classe	Chief petty officer 2nd class Premier maître de 2^{e} classe	Petty officer 1st class Maître de 1^{re} classe	Petty officer 2nd class Maître de 2^{e} classe		Leading seaman Matelot de 1^{re} classe	Able seaman Matelot de 2^{e} classe	Ordinary seaman Matelot de 3^{e} classe	Recruit; Recrue
Maritime Command (1968–1973)
Maritime Command (1973–1985)
Rank titles (1968–1985)	Chief petty officer 1st class Premier maître de 1^{re} classe	Chief petty officer 2nd class Premier maître de 2^{e} classe	Petty officer 1st class Maître de 1^{re} classe	Petty officer 2nd class Maître de 2^{e} classe	Master seaman Matelot-chef	Leading seaman Matelot de 1^{re} classe	Able seaman Matelot de 2^{e} classe	Ordinary seaman Matelot de 3^{e} classe	Seaman recruit Matelot recrue
Maritime Command (1985–2010)
Maritime Command (1985–2010)	Chief petty officer 1st class Premier maître de 1^{re} classe	Chief petty officer 2nd class Premier maître de 2^{e} classe	Petty officer 1st class Maître de 1^{re} classe	Petty officer 2nd class Maître de 2^{e} classe	Master seaman Matelot-chef	Leading seaman Matelot de 1^{re} classe	Able seaman Matelot de 2^{e} classe	Ordinary seaman Matelot de 3^{e} classe	Seaman recruit Matelot recrue
Royal Canadian Navy (2011–present)
Rank titles (2011–2020)	Chief petty officer 1st class Premier maître de 1^{re} classe	Chief petty officer 2nd class Premier maître de 2^{e} classe	Petty officer 1st class Maître de 1^{re} classe	Petty officer 2nd class Maître de 2^{e} classe		Master seaman Matelot-chef	Leading seaman Matelot de 1^{re} classe	Able seaman Matelot de 2^{e} classe	Ordinary seaman Matelot de 3^{e} classe
Rank titles (2020–present)	Chief petty officer 1st class Premier maître de 1^{re} classe or Première maître de 1^{re} classe	Chief petty officer 2nd class Premier maître de 2^{e} classe or Première maître de 2^{e} classe	Petty officer 1st class Maître de 1^{re} classe	Petty officer 2nd class Maître de 2^{e} classe		Master sailor Matelot-chef	Sailor 1st class Matelot de 1^{re} classe	Sailor 2nd class Matelot de 2^{e} classe	Sailor 3rd class Matelot de 3^{e} classe
NATO code	OR-9	OR-8	OR-7	OR-6	OR-5	OR-4	OR-3	OR-2	OR-1

== Evolution of Canadian Army ranks and insignia ==

From 2017 to 2023, the Bath Star (above) was replaced by the Vimy Star.

Prior to unification in 1968, the Canadian Army used rank insignia identical to the British Army. When the universal CF green uniform was adopted at unification, Mobile Command, like the other services, used gold braid sleeve stripes as rank insignia. When distinctive environmental uniforms were adopted in the mid-1980s, the army retained the green uniform with gold stripes.

On 8 July 2013, Minister of National Defence Peter MacKay announced the intention to reintroduce a more traditional style Canadian Army officers' rank insignia. Instead of the sleeve stripe rank insignia used since unification, officers would use the older St Edward's Crown and Star of the Order of the Bath insignia, commonly called "pips and crowns". Gorget patches were also restored for officers of the rank of colonel or higher. The new insignia for officers, instead of using the current British rank insignia for brigadier (used in the Canadian Army until 1968), had the pre-1920 brigadier-general insignia (crossed sabre and baton) instead.

On 2 April 2016, the Commander of the Canadian Army announced that general officers would revert to the unification-era rank insignia worn between 1968 and 2013. This rank insignia is based on the shoulder board rank insignia of Royal Canadian Navy flag officers. The rank insignia of general officers now consists of a crown, crossed sabre and baton, and a series of maple leaves on shoulder straps. Additionally, general officers wear one broad gold band on each of the lower sleeves of the service dress tunic.

In order to mark the centenary of the Battle of Vimy Ridge, from 2017 to 2023 the Bath Star pip with motto tria juncta in uno (Latin for 'three joined in one') was replaced by the "Vimy Star". It depicted a maple leaf and was surrounded by the motto vigilamus pro te (Latin for 'we stand on guard for thee'). Commissioned officers of the household guard regiments (Governor General's Foot Guards, Canadian Grenadier Guards, and Governor General's Horse Guards), plus army personnel stationed to the seasonal Ceremonial Guard, use the Guards Star.

=== Timeline of changes ===
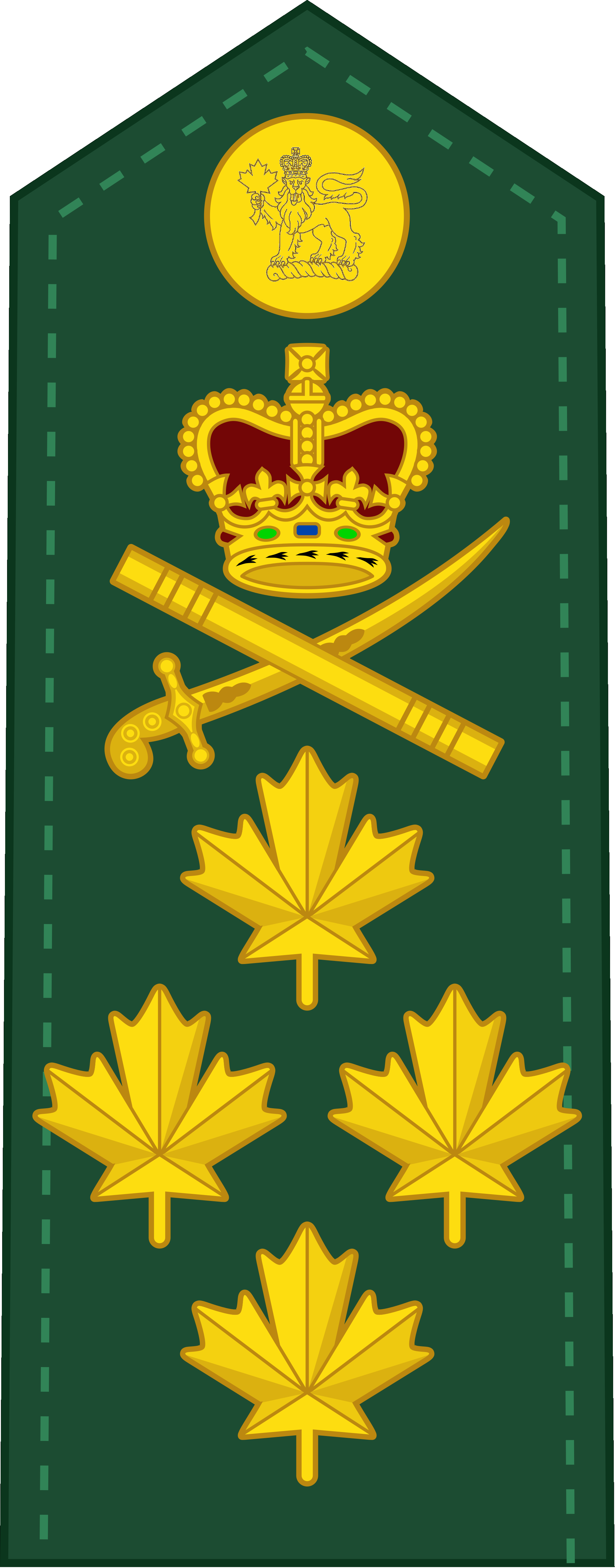
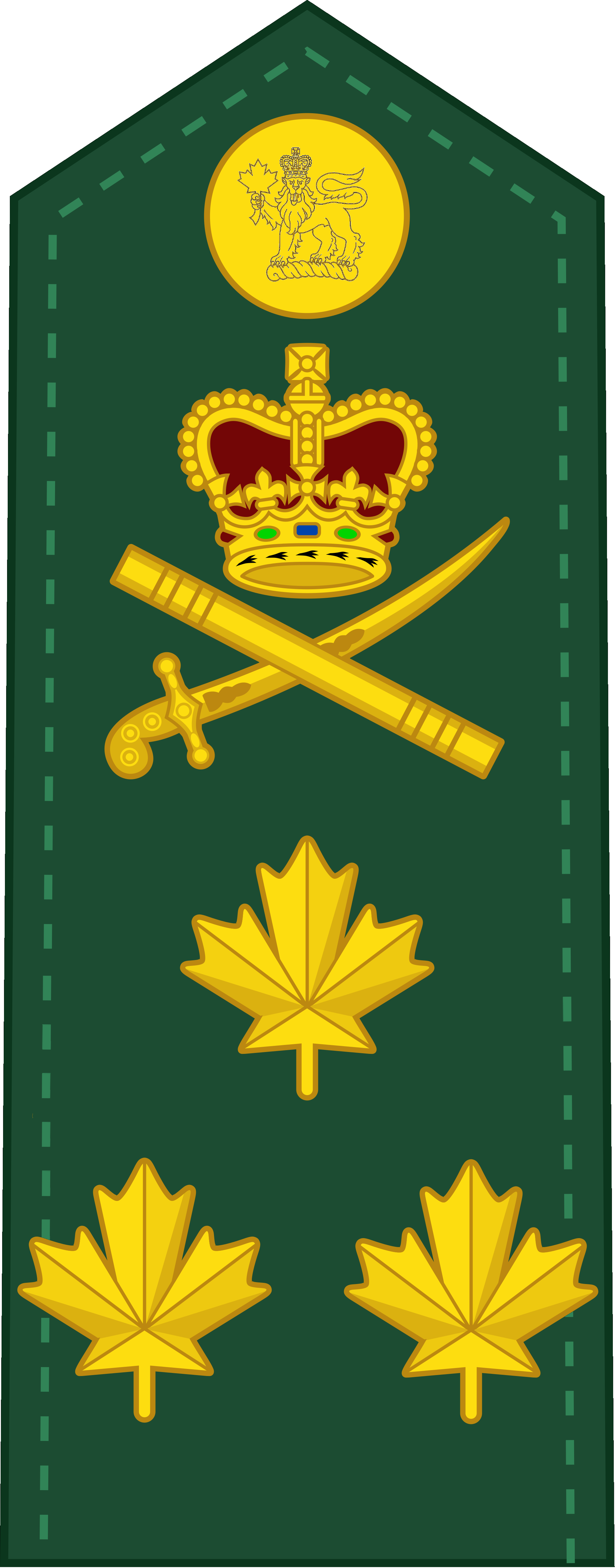
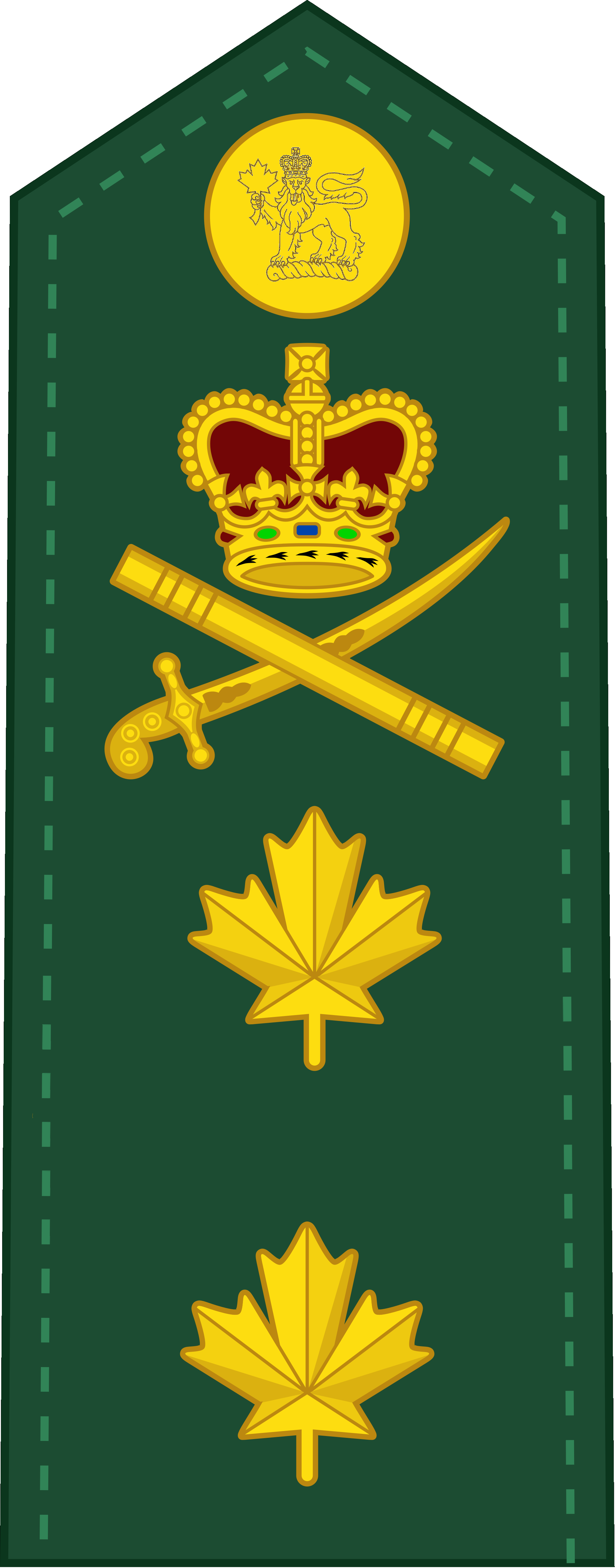
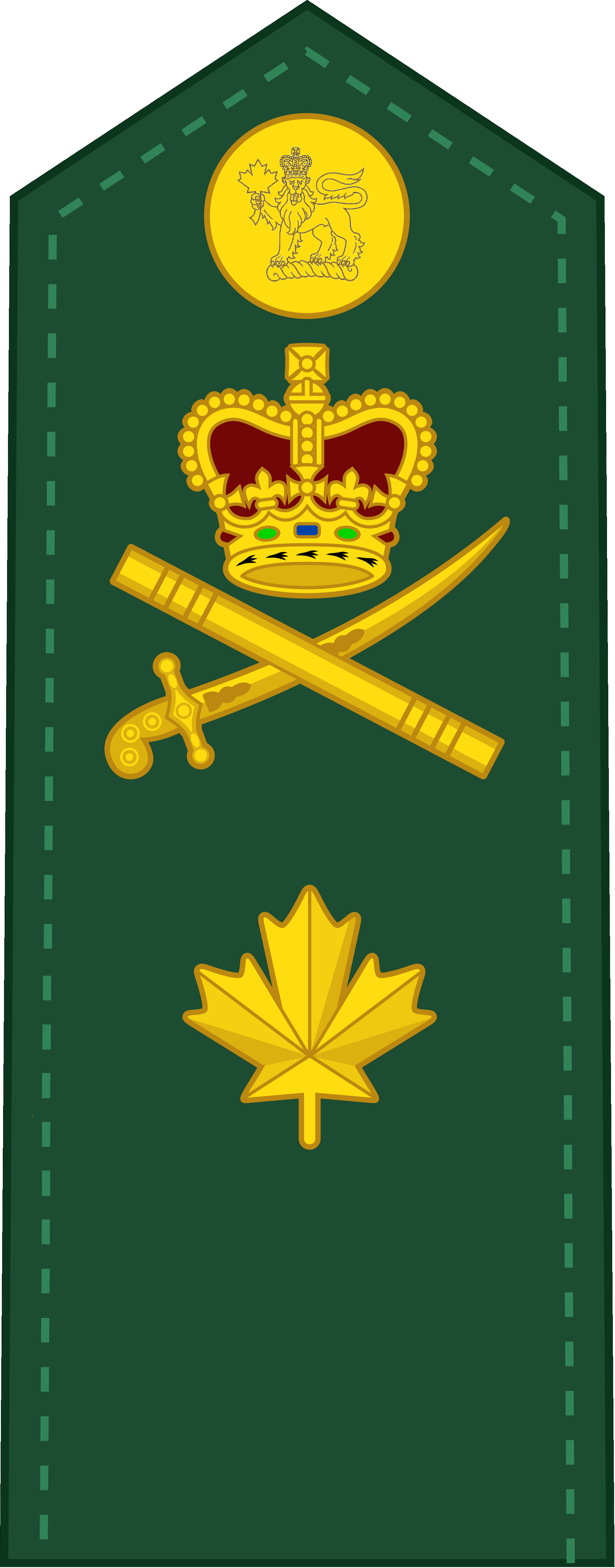
Rank group	General / flag officers					Senior officers			Junior officers
Canadian Militia (1902–1920); Canadian Expeditionary Force (1914–1920)
Canadian Militia (1902–1920); Canadian Expeditionary Force (1914–1920)		General	Lieutenant-general	Major-general	Brigadier-general	Colonel	Lieutenant-colonel	Major	Captain	Lieutenant	Second lieutenant	Officer cadet
Canadian Militia (1921–1940); Canadian Army (1940–1953)
Canadian Militia (1921–1940); Canadian Army (1940–1953)		General	Lieutenant-general	Major-general	Colonel commandant	Colonel	Lieutenant-colonel	Major	Captain	Lieutenant	Second lieutenant	Officer cadet
Canadian Army (1953–1968)
Canadian Army (1953–1968)		General	Lieutenant-general	Major-general	Brigadier	Colonel	Lieutenant-colonel	Major	Captain	Lieutenant	Second lieutenant	Officer cadet
Mobile Command & Land Force Command (1968–2013)
Canadian Army (2013–2016)
Canadian Army (2016–2017)
Canadian Army (2017–2023)
Canadian Army (2023–present)
Rank titles		General; Général or Générale	Lieutenant-general; Lieutenant-général or Lieutenante-générale	Major-general; Major-général or Majore-générale	Brigadier-general; Brigadier-général or Brigadière-générale	Colonel; Colonel or Colonelle	Lieutenant-colonel; Lieutenant-colonel or Lieutenante-colonelle	Major; Major or Majore	Captain; Capitaine	Lieutenant; Lieutenant or Lieutenante	Second lieutenant Sous-lieutenant or Sous-lieutenante	Officer cadet Élève-officier or Élève-officière
NATO code	OF-10	OF-9	OF-8	OF-7	OF-6	OF-5	OF-4	OF-3	OF-2	OF-1

Rank group	Senior NCOs					Junior NCOs		Enlisted
(1920–1953)								No insignia
(1920–1953)	Warrant officer class I	Warrant officer class II	Staff/Colour sergeant	Sergeant		Corporal	Lance corporal	Private (or equivalent)
Canadian Army (1953–1966)								No insignia
Canadian Army (1953–1966)	Warrant officer class I/1	Warrant officer class II/2	Staff/Colour sergeant	Sergeant		Corporal	Lance corporal	Private (or equivalent)
Canadian Army (1966–1968)								No insignia
Canadian Army (1966–1968)	Warrant officer class I/1	Warrant officer class II/2	Staff/Colour sergeant	Sergeant	Master corporal	Corporal	Lance corporal	Private (or equivalent)
Land Force Command (1968–1973)
Land Force Command (1973–2010)
Rank titles (1968–2010)	Chief warrant officer Adjudant-chef	Master warrant officer Adjudant-maître	Warrant officer Adjudant	Sergeant; Sergent	Master corporal Caporal-chef	Corporal; Caporal	Private; Soldat	Private (basic); Soldat (Confirmé)	Private (recruit); Soldat (Recrue)
Land Force Command (2011–Present)
Rank titles (2011–Present)	Chief warrant officer Adjudant-chef or Adjudante-chef	Master warrant officer Adjudant-maître or Adjudante-maître	Warrant officer Adjudant or Adjudante	Sergeant; Sergent or Sergente		Master corporal Caporal-chef or Caporale-chef	Corporal; Caporal or Caporale	Private; Soldat or Soldate	Private (basic); Soldat (Confirmé) or Soldate (Confirmée)
NATO code	OR-9	OR-8	OR-7	OR-6	OR-5	OR-4	OR-3	OR-2	OR-1

== Evolution of Royal Canadian Air Force rank and insignia ==
Canadian Air Force ranks and insignia originally were taken from the Royal Air Force practice. Upon unification, the Air Command used identical ranks and insignia as the Land Command. When Air-specific blue DEUs were introduced, the gold rank insignia were retained.

In April 2015, the Royal Canadian Air Force adopted new rank insignia reminiscent of the pre-unification RCAF system. The new officer rank insignia uses pearl-grey-on-black rank stripes instead of gold. Non-commissioned members (NCMs) rank insignia is pearl grey instead of gold. The colour gold found elsewhere on the uniform was also changed to pearl-grey. The air force rank of private, formerly indicated by one chevron, became aviator (aviateur), and is indicated by a horizontally-aligned two-bladed propeller. All other ranks titles remain as they were.

=== Timeline of changes ===
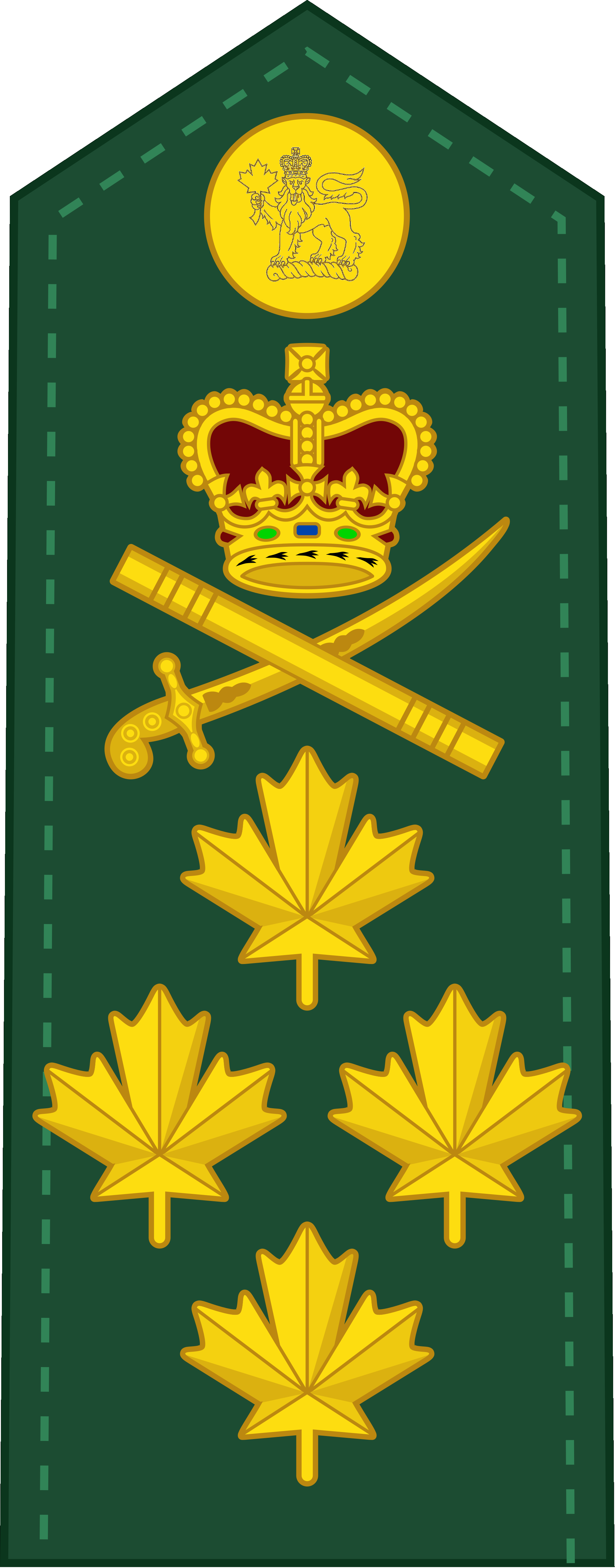
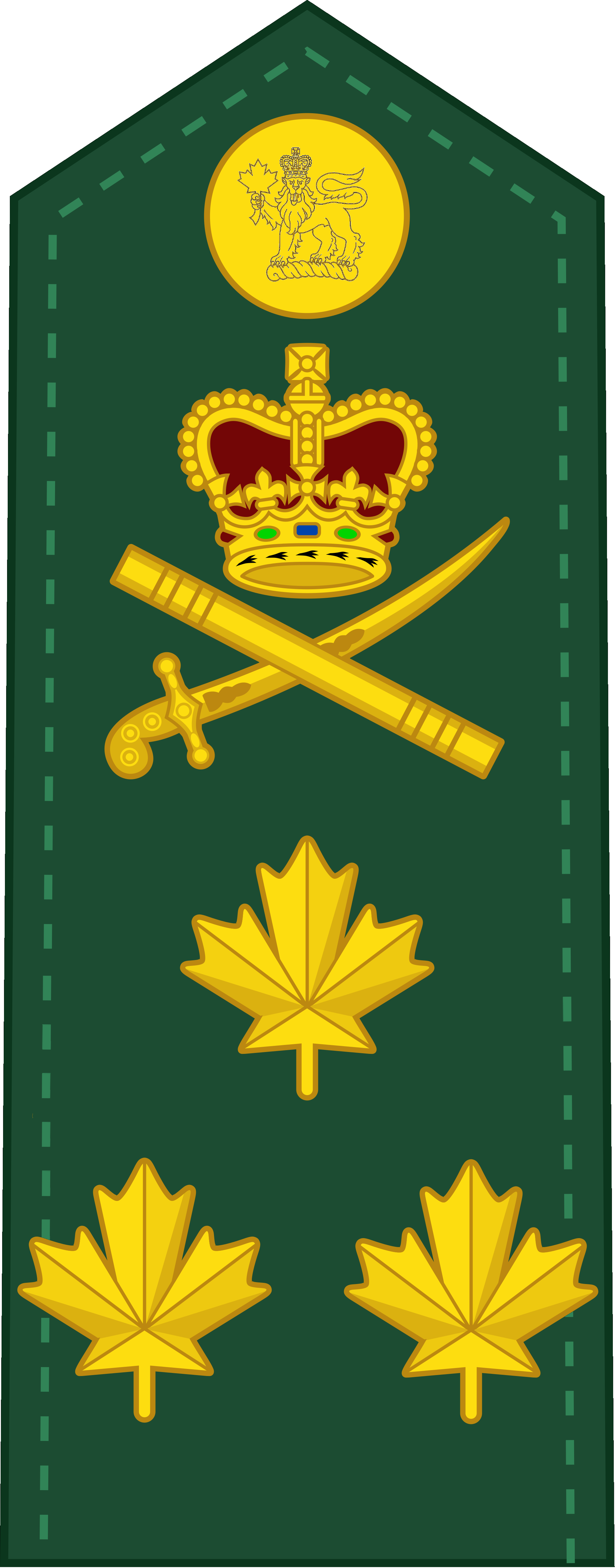
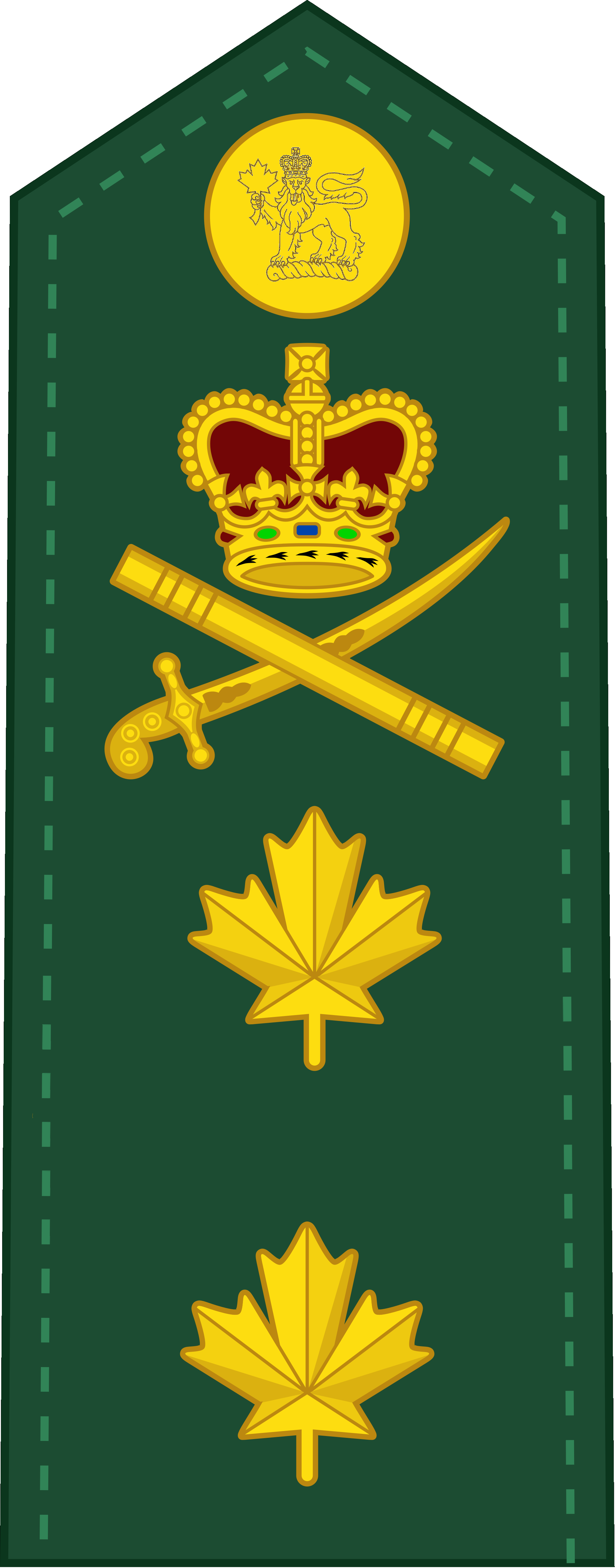
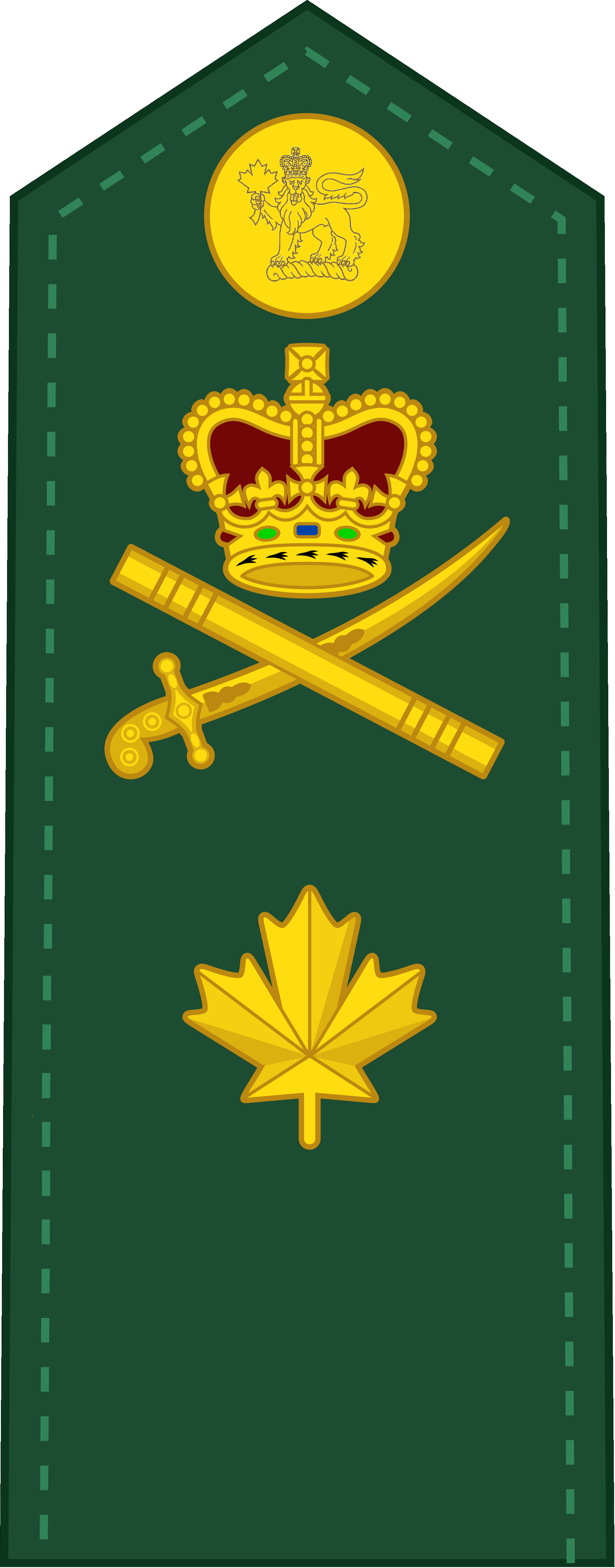
Rank group	General / flag officers					Senior officers			Junior officers
Royal Canadian Air Force (1924–1968)
Rank titles (1924–1968)	Marshal of the Royal Canadian Air Force (Note: Rank insigna for marshal of the RCAF appeared in RCAF dress regulations from 1925 to 1968, but no RCAF officer ever held the rank.)	Air chief marshal Maréchal en chef de l’Air	Air marshal Maréchal de l’Air	Air vice-marshal Vice-maréchal de l’Air	Air commodore Commodore de l’Air	Group captain Colonel d’aviation	Wing commander Lieutenant-colonel d’aviation	Squadron leader Commandant d’aviation	Flight lieutenant Capitaine d’aviation	Flying officer Lieutenant d’aviation	Pilot officer Sous-lieutenant d’aviation	Flight cadet/ officer cadet (post-1962); Élève-officier
Air Command (1968–1984)
Air Command (1984–2014)
Royal Canadian Air Force (2014–present)
Rank titles (1968–present)		General; Général or Générale	Lieutenant-general; Lieutenant-général or Lieutenante-générale	Major-general; Major-général or Majore-générale	Brigadier-general; Brigadier-général or Brigadière-générale	Colonel; Colonel or Colonelle	Lieutenant-colonel; Lieutenant-colonel or Lieutenante-colonelle	Major; Major or Majore	Captain; Capitaine	Lieutenant; Lieutenant or Lieutenante	Second lieutenant Sous-lieutenant or Sous-lieutenante	Officer cadet Élève-officier or Élève-officière
NATO code	OF-10	OF-9	OF-8	OF-7	OF-6	OF-5	OF-4	OF-3	OF-2	OF-1

Rank group	Senior NCOs					Junior NCOs		Enlisted
Air Force (1948–1953)									No insignia
Air Force (1953–1968)									No insignia
Rank titles (1948–1968)	Warrant officer first class Adjudant de 1^{re} classe	Warrant officer second class Adjudant de 2^{e} classe	Flight sergeant Sergent de section	Sergeant; Sergent		Corporal; Caporal		Leading aircraftman/aircraftwoman Aviateur-chef	Aircraftman/Aircraftwoman first class Aviateur 1^{re} classe	Aircraftman/Aircraftwoman second class Aviateur 2^{e} classe
Air Command (1968–1973)
Air Command (1973–1984)
Air Command (1984–2010)
Rank titles (1968–2010)	Chief warrant officer Adjudant-chef	Master warrant officer Adjudant-maître	Warrant officer Adjudant	Sergeant; Sergent	Master corporal Caporal-chef	Corporal; Caporal	Private; Soldat	Private (basic); Soldat (confirmé)	Private (recruit); Soldat (recrue)
Air Command (2010–2014)
Rank titles (2010–2014)	Chief warrant officer Adjudant-chef	Master warrant officer Adjudant-maître	Warrant officer Adjudant	Sergeant; Sergent		Master corporal Caporal-chef	Corporal; Caporal	Private; Soldat	Private (basic); Soldat (confirmé)
Royal Canadian Air Force (2014–present)
Rank titles (2014–present)	Chief warrant officer Adjudant-chef or Adjudante-chef	Master warrant officer Adjudant-maître or Adjudante-maître	Warrant officer Adjudant or Adjudante	Sergeant; Sergent or Sergente		Master corporal Caporal-chef or Caporale-chef	Corporal; Caporal or Caporale	Aviator; Aviateur or Aviatrice	Aviator (basic); Aviateur (confirmé) or Aviatrice (confirmée)
NATO code	OR-9	OR-8	OR-7	OR-6	OR-5	OR-4	OR-3	OR-2	OR-1

=== Mess dress ===
Contrary to the Royal Canadian Navy and the Canadian Army, mess dress uniform ranks for officers of the Royal Canadian Air Force follow the naval pattern, without the executive curl. General officers do not wear shoulder straps with this order of dress.

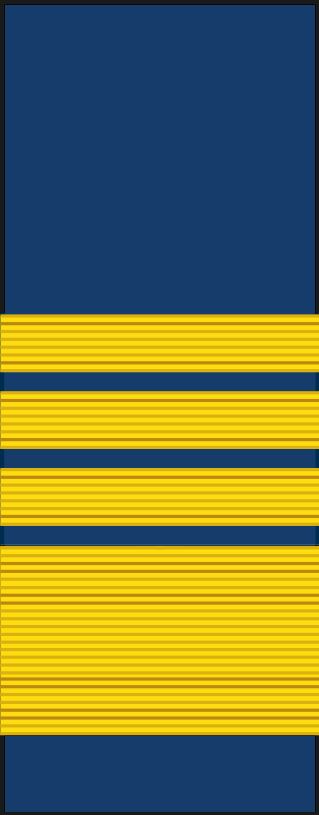
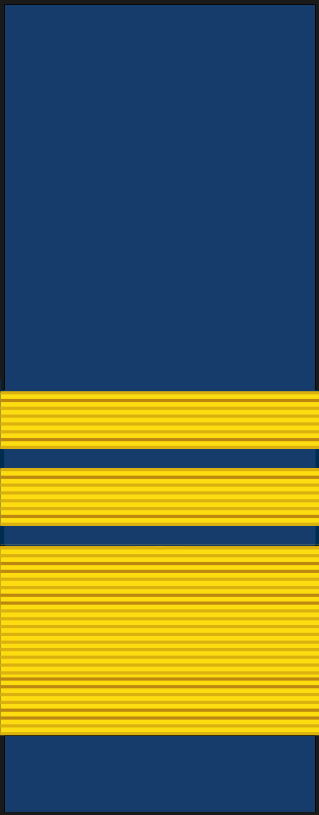
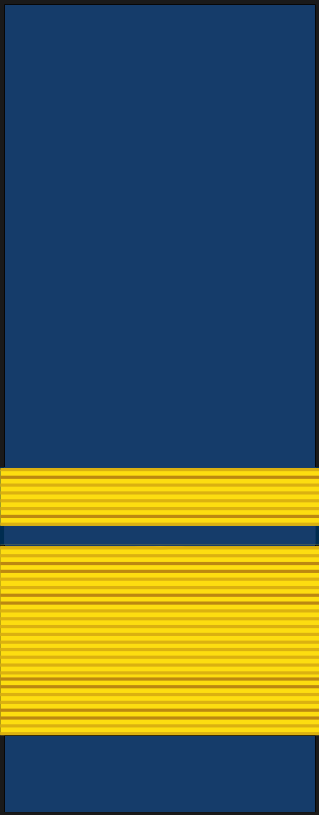
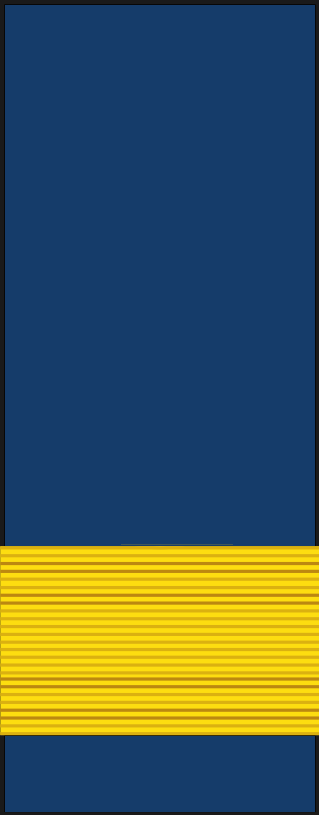
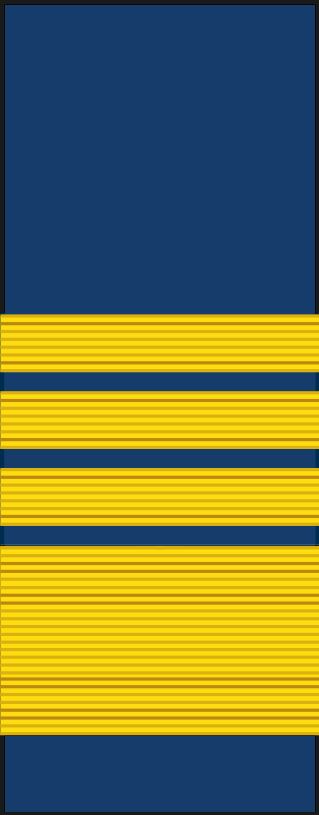
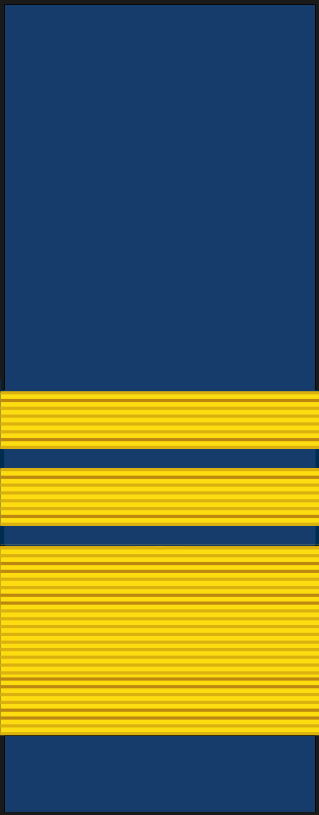
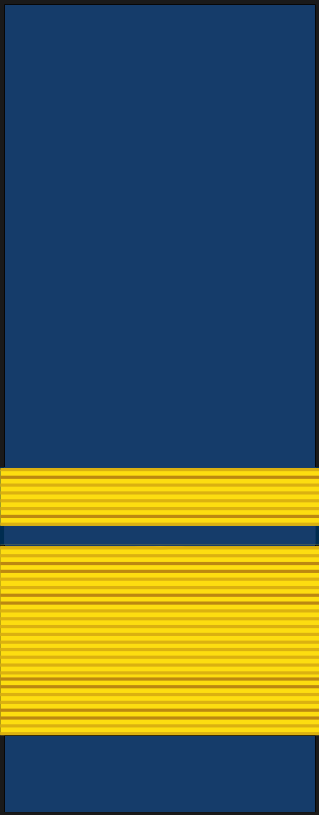
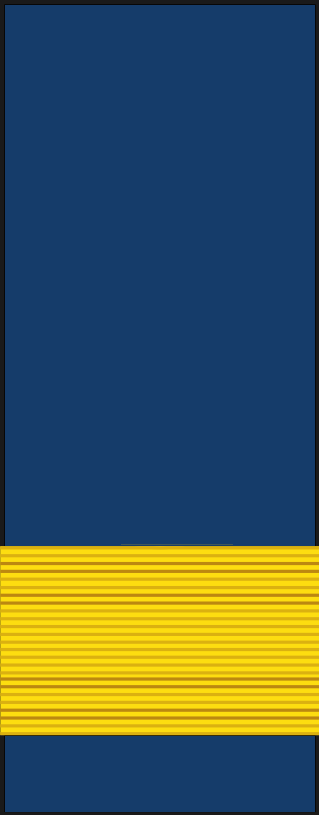
NATO Code	OF-10	OF-9	OF-8	OF-7	OF-6	OF-5	OF-4	OF-3	OF-2	OF-1	OF(D)	Student officer
Royal Canadian Air Force; Mess dress and full dress (Note: The wearing of full dress and mess dress by RCAF officers was suspended "for the duration of hostilities" on 30 August 1940. Full dress was not reinstated after the war.) ranks 1925–1968
Air Command; Mess ranks 1968–2014
Royal Canadian Air Force; Mess ranks 2015–Present

== See also ==
- Former ranks of the Canadian Forces
- Historic Royal Canadian Air Force ranks (1924–1968)
- Ranks and insignia of NATO
- List of comparative military ranks
- Comparative army officer ranks of the Americas
- Uniforms of the Canadian Armed Forces
- Cadets Canada Elemental Ranks
