= Lieutenant (Royal Canadian Navy) =

See "Lieutenant" for other countries which use this rank

Lieutenant Royal Canadian Navy

In the Royal Canadian Navy, the rank of lieutenant(N) (Lt(N)) (French: Lieutenant de vaisseau) is the naval rank equal to captain in the army or air force. When the naval rank lieutenant is written or typed, it is followed by the letter N to indicate that it is a naval rank to distinguish it from army and air force lieutenants (and therefore, the (N) remains silent as it must not be pronounced or replaced by the word (Navy)). Lieutenants(N) are senior to sub-lieutenants and to army and air force lieutenants, and are junior to lieutenant-commanders and majors.

Typical appointments for a lieutenant(N) include:

- Combat director or head of department of a frigate, destroyer, or supply ship
- Training officer at naval fleet schools or Naval Reserve divisions
- Executive officer of a minor warship or submarine
- Staff officer on a formation or task group headquarters staff.
- Commanding officer of Royal Canadian Sea Cadet corps

The rank insignia for a lieutenant(N) is two ½-inch (13 mm) stripes with the executive curl on the top stripe, worn on the cuffs of the service dress jacket, and on slip-ons on other uniforms. As junior officers, they wear one gold band along the edge of the visor of their service caps. Lieutenants of the Naval Operations Branch wear the officer's pattern of the branch cap badge: an anchor on a black oval, surrounded by a wreath of maple leaves at the sides and base of the oval, the whole surmounted by the St Edward's Crown. Specialist officers in such branches as logistics, intelligence, medical, etc., wear their branch cap badges.

Prior to unification of the Canadian Forces in 1968, rank structure and insignia followed the British pattern. As part of the Canadian Naval Centennial the executive curl pattern of naval officer's rank was returned to all uniforms.

== See also ==
- Canadian Forces ranks and insignia
- Former ranks of the Canadian Forces
- List of comparative military ranks
