= Chief petty officer =

Senior non-commissioned officer in many navies and coast guards

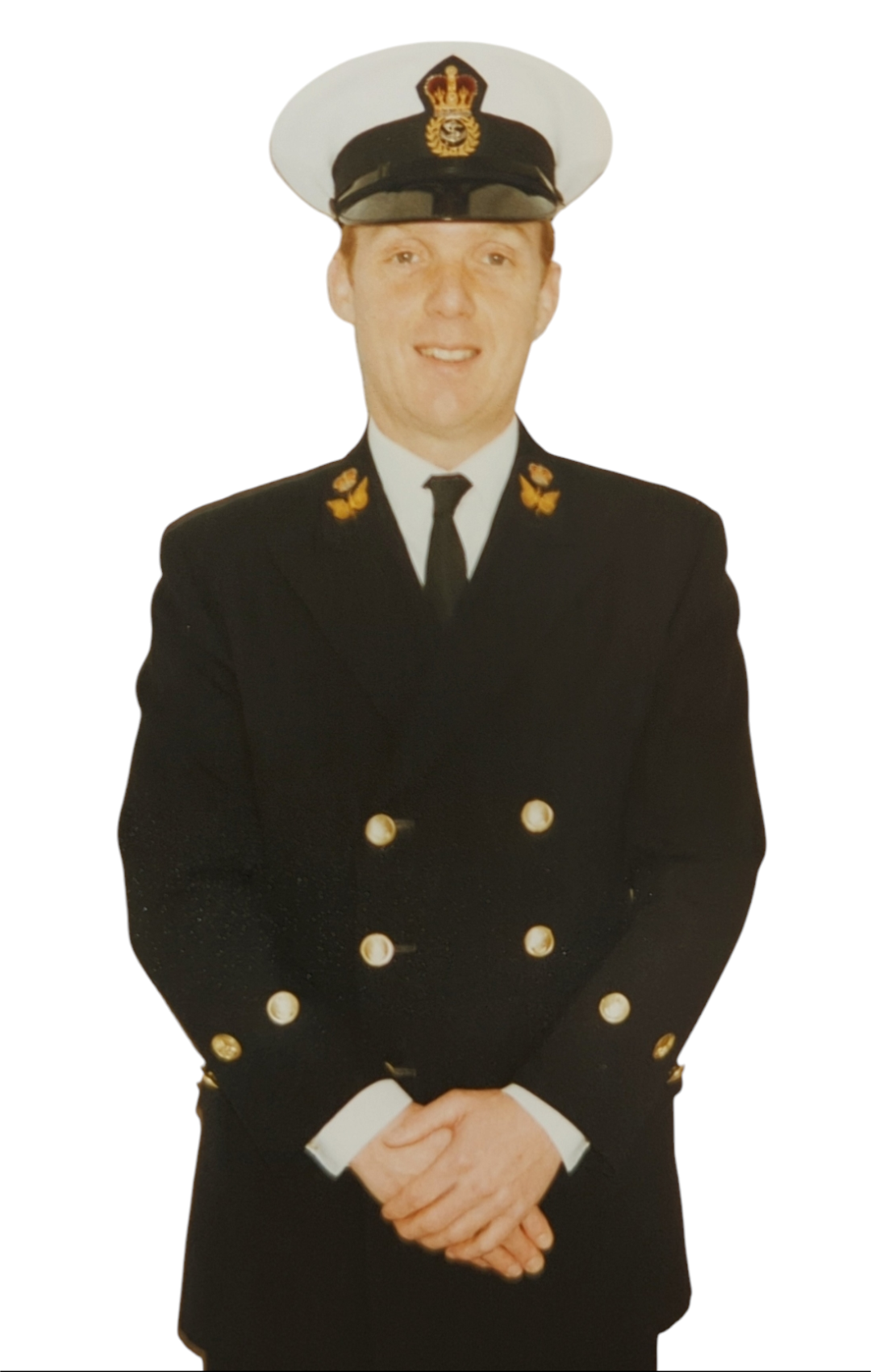
Chief Petty Officer, Royal Navy - circa 1994

A chief petty officer (CPO) is a senior non-commissioned officer in many navies and coast guards, usually above petty officer.

== By country ==
=== Australia ===
Chief petty officer is the second highest non-commissioned rank in the Royal Australian Navy.

=== Canada ===
There are two chief petty officer ranks in the Royal Canadian Navy. A chief petty officer 2nd class (CPO2) (premier maître de deuxième classe or pm2 in French) is equivalent to a master warrant officer in the Army and Air Force, and chief petty officer 1st class (CPO1) (premier maître de première classe or pm1) is equivalent to a chief warrant officer in the Army and Air Force. In spoken references, chief petty officers may be addressed as "chief" but are never addressed as "sir".

=== India ===
A chief petty officer in Indian Navy is a junior commissioned officer. This rank is equivalent to naib subedar in Indian Army and junior warrant officer in the Indian Air force. The two highest enlisted ranks are master chief petty officer second class (MCPO II), equivalent to subedar/warrant officer, and master chief petty officer first class (MCPO I), equivalent to subedar major/master warrant officer in the Indian Army and Indian Air Force respectively

=== Pakistan ===
Fleet chief petty officer is a commissioned and gazetted rank in the Pakistan Navy above chief petty officer and below master chief petty officer. It is equivalent to the Pakistan Air Force warrant officer and the Pakistan Army subedar.

=== Philippines ===
In the Philippine Navy, the rank of chief petty officer, is equivalent to master sergeant in the Philippine Marine Corps and Philippine Air Force.

=== United Kingdom ===
In the Royal Navy, the rank of chief petty officer comes above that of petty officer and below that of warrant officer class 2. It is the equivalent of colour sergeant in the Royal Marines, colour sergeant or staff sergeant in the Army, and flight sergeant in the Royal Air Force.

=== United States ===
Chief petty officer is an E-7 enlisted rank in the U.S. Navy and U.S. Coast Guard, just above petty officer first class and below senior chief petty officer. Chief petty officers are classified as senior non-commissioned officers. The grade of chief petty officer was established on 1 April 1893, for the U.S. Navy. The U.S. Congress first authorized the U.S. Coast Guard to use the promotion to chief petty officer on 18 May 1920.

Unlike petty officer first class and lower rates, advancement to chief petty officer in the U.S. Navy not only carries requirements of time in service, superior evaluation scores, and specialty examinations, but also carries an added requirement of peer review. A chief petty officer can only advance after review by a selection board of serving master chief petty officers, in effect "choosing their own" and conversely not choosing others.

== Insignia ==
Antigua and Barbuda Coast Guard

Royal Australian Navy

Royal Bahamas Defence Force

Bangladesh Navy

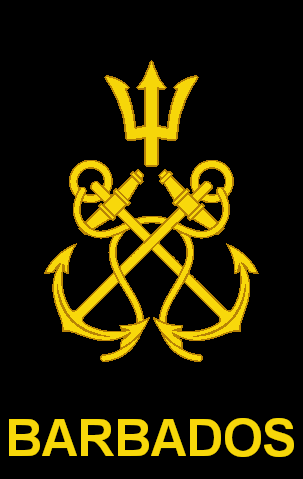
Barbados Coast Guard

Belize Coast Guard

Republic of Fiji Navy

Ghana Navy

Guyana Coast Guard

Ard-mhion-oifigeach
Irish Naval Service

Jamaican Coast Guard

Liberian National Coast Guard

Indian Navy

Namibian Navy

Royal New Zealand Navy

Papua New Guinea Maritime Element

Sierra Leone Navy

South African Navy

Sri Lanka Navy

Trinidad and Tobago Coast Guard

Royal Navy

United States Navy

United States Coast Guard

== See also ==
- Comparative military ranks
- List of United States Navy enlisted rates
- List of United States Coast Guard enlisted rates
