= Former ranks of the Canadian Armed Forces =

Before Unification as the Canadian Armed Forces in 1968, the Canadian military had three distinct services: the Royal Canadian Navy, the Royal Canadian Air Force, and the Canadian Army. All three services had a Regular (full-time) component and a reserve (part-time) component. The rank structure for these services were based on the services of the British military, the Royal Navy, the Royal Air Force, and the British Army. The change to a "Canadian" rank structure meant that many of the traditional (British) rank titles and insignia were removed or changed.

== Relative ranks and responsibilities ==
The ranks of the new Canadian Armed Forces did not match up exactly with the ranks (and attendant responsibilities) of the old system.

In the army, for example, an infantry platoon would have a sergeant for a second in command and a staff sergeant would serve as a company quartermaster sergeant. In the new Canadian Forces, however, a warrant officer would fill both those roles. While an infantry section was commanded by a corporal pre-unification, after unification that task fell on a sergeant. The rank of corporal in the army was especially downgraded in terms of responsibility; before unification a Canadian corporal was the equivalent of a sergeant in most other armies due to his responsibility as a section commander. After unification, the rank of corporal became nothing more than a pay raise with authority being granted instead to the new master corporals. Equivalents in the table below are very approximate, then.

Canadian Forces Maritime Command (1968–2011), RCN (2011–)	Royal Canadian Navy (before 1968)	Canadian Forces (Land Force Command (from 2011 Canadian Army), Air Command (RCAF from 2011)	Canadian Army before 1968	Royal Canadian Air Force (before 1968)
Flag officers		General officers		Air officers
Admiral	Admiral	General	General	Air chief marshal
Vice admiral	Vice admiral	Lieutenant general	Lieutenant general	Air marshal
Rear admiral	Rear admiral	Major general	Major general	Air vice marshal
Commodore	Commodore	Brigadier general	Brigadier	Air commodore
Officers
Captain (N)	Captain	Colonel	Colonel	Group captain
Commander	Commander	Lieutenant colonel	Lieutenant colonel	Wing commander
Lieutenant commander	Lieutenant commander	Major	Major	Squadron leader
Lieutenant (N)	Lieutenant	Captain	Captain	Flight lieutenant
Sub lieutenant	Sub lieutenant	Lieutenant	Lieutenant	Flying officer
Acting sub lieutenant	Acting sub lieutenant	Second lieutenant	Second lieutenant	Pilot officer
Naval cadet	Midshipman	Officer cadet	Officer cadet	Officer cadet (flight cadet before 1962, provisional pilot officer before WWII)
Non-commissioned personnel
Chief petty officer 1st class	Chief petty officer 1st class	Chief warrant officer	Warrant officer class I	Warrant officer class I
Chief petty officer 2nd class	Chief petty officer 2nd class	Master warrant officer	Warrant officer class II	Warrant officer class II
Petty officer 1st class	Petty officer 1st class	Warrant officer	Staff sergeant	Flight sergeant
Petty officer 1st class	Petty officer 1st class	Warrant officer	Sergeant	Sergeant
Petty officer 2nd class	Petty officer 2nd class	Sergeant	Lance sergeant	Corporal
Petty officer 2nd class	Petty officer 2nd class	Sergeant	Corporal	Corporal
Master seaman	Leading seaman	Master corporal	Lance corporal	Leading aircraftman
Leading seaman	Able seaman	Corporal	Private	Aircraftman class 1
Able seaman	Ordinary seaman	Private (trained)	Private	Aircraftman class 2
Ordinary seaman	Recruit	Private (recruit)	Recruit	Recruit

The RCN replaced the use of seaman on 27 August 2020 with sailor. Master seaman became master sailor, leading seaman became sailor 1st class, able seaman became sailor 2nd class, ordinary seaman became sailor 3rd class.

Certain ranks have alternative titles according to tradition and the trade of the soldier.

The rank of private (trained) uses the following names (all privates prior to receiving their trade qualifications are called privates)
Royal Canadian Armoured Corps – trooper
Royal Regiment of Canadian Artillery – gunner
Royal Canadian Engineers – sapper
Royal Canadian Corps of Signals – signaller
Royal Canadian Infantry Corps
- Guards regiments – guardsman
- Rifle regiments – rifleman
- Fusilier regiments – fusilier
Royal Canadian Electrical and Mechanical Engineers – craftsman
Royal Canadian Air Force – aviator
Lance corporals
Royal Regiment of Canadian Artillery – lance bombardier
Corporals
Royal Regiment of Canadian Artillery – bombardier
Master corporals
Royal Regiment of Canadian Artillery – master bombardier

== Pre-unification RCN ==
=== Officer's insignia ===
The RCN used the rank and insignia of the RN.

RCN officers wore gold stripes with the naval executive curl above to denote rank. Also similar to that of the Royal Navy, the patterns of the insignia denoted which part of the navy the officer served in. The standard braid indicated an officer of RCN (the regular force), single wavy braid an officer of the Royal Canadian Naval Volunteer Reserve (RCNVR, nicknamed the "Wavy Navy") and intersecting wavy pairs an officer of the Royal Canadian Naval Reserve. After 1945, the RCNVR and the RCNR were merged to form the Royal Canadian Naval Reserve and in the mid-1950s, the RCNR later adopted the same officer's pattern of the regular RCN.

Also following the RN practice in the 1950s, the rank of acting sub lieutenant was officially introduced to roughly match that of an army second lieutenant or an RCAF pilot officer.

=== Ratings insignia ===
Following the RN practice, non-commissioned personnel were known as ratings.

From the RCN's creation in 1910 until about 1950, the only ratings were that of ordinary seaman, able seaman, leading seaman, petty officer and chief petty officer. Rank-wise, an able seaman would be the rough equivalent of an army lance corporal and a leading seaman (also known as a killick) would roughly match that of a corporal. A petty officer depending on length of service would match that of a sergeant or staff sergeant and a chief petty officer of that of an army warrant officer.

Rank (1910–1950)	Insignia
Chief petty officer	3 brass buttons worn on the lower sleeve
Petty officer	2 crossed foul anchors with a crown Above
Leading seaman	1 foul anchor
Able seaman	No insignia
Ordinary seaman	No insignia

Good conduct chevrons were worn by ratings up to the rank of petty officer on the upper sleeve (worn directly under the rank badges of leading seamen and petty officers or alone by ordinary and able seamen).

- 1 chevron - 3 years' good conduct
- 2 chevrons - 8 years' good conduct
- 3 chevrons - 13 or more years' good conduct

Starting around the 1950s, the RCN's ratings rank structure was changed to match closer to that of the army's. As such, the ranks of petty officer 2nd class and petty officer 1st class were introduced to match those of an army/RCAF sergeant and staff sergeant/flight sergeant respectively. Likewise, the ranks of chief petty officer 2nd class and chief petty officer 1st class were similarly introduced to match those of an army/RCAF warrant officer class II and warrant officer class I respectively.

Rank (1950–1968)	Insignia
Chief petty officer 1st class	3 brass buttons with a crown above worn on the lower sleeve
Chief petty officer 2nd class	3 brass buttons worn on the lower sleeve
Petty officer 1st class	2 crossed foul anchors with a crown above
Petty officer 2nd class	2 crossed foul anchors
Leading seaman	1 foul anchor
Able seaman	No insignia
Ordinary seaman	No insignia

Good conduct chevrons continued to be worn up to the rank of petty officer 1st class until Unification of the Canadian Armed Forces in 1968.

Similar to that of the army, the crown worn with insignia until 1953 was the Tudor Crown. After 1953, it was replaced by St. Edward's Crown.

== Pre-unification army ==
=== Officer's insignia ===
Army officers' insignia before unification consisted of several rank badges based on British Army designs:

- The star of the Order of the Bath, commonly called a "pip", in sequence of one, two or three as necessary.
- The crown (the Tudor Crown from 1902 to 1953, the St. Edward's Crown from 1953 to the present).
- The Mameluke sword, crossed by a baton, was used in general officer's insignia.

=== Other Ranks insignia ===
Army warrant officers also used rank badges based on British designs:

- A warrant officer class I wore the royal coat of arms of Canada; before the 1950s, the British royal coat of arms was worn.
- A warrant officer class II wore a crown (either St. Edward's pattern or Tudor pattern, as described under officers' insignia above) within a wreath.
- During the Second World War, a warrant officer class III had worn a plain crown; this rank was abolished in practice during, and officially after, the war.

Finally, Army NCOs also used rank badges based on British designs:

- Rank badges were constructed from white herringbone lace sewn into 1-, 2-, or 3-bar chevrons. A crown was worn over the chevrons for staff sergeants.

== Pre-unification RCAF ==
The RCAF for the most part used the rank and insignia of the RAF. The main difference however was where the RAF had only 1 Warrant Officer rank and the use of aircrew ranks, the RCAF used the ranks of Warrant Officer Class II and Warrant Officer Class I similar to that of the Canadian Army and had no air crew ranks.

Around 1953, the RCAF changed its other ranks / airmen's insignia from blue-black to grey/silver.

== Unified Canadian Forces ==
A series of gold stripes was instituted, similar to the pre-unification naval and air force rank system in concept but very different in appearance. Warrant officers retained the traditional army-style rank badges, and NCOs' chevrons were also changed, being smaller and made from newer material. The maple leaf also featured on NCO badges, even being worn over a private's one-bar chevron in initial issues of the new insignia in the years immediately after unification. The nickname for this short-lived rank was Trade Corporal.

Early post unification Private (qualification level 4a) insignia with maple leaf.

Early post unification Corporal insignia with maple leaf.

Generals' and admirals' insignia remained similar to pre-unification army insignia, with maple leaves replacing the stars, but retaining the crown and crossed sabre and baton. A wide band of gold braid was also used, similar to pre-unification naval insignia worn by admirals. Naval officers of flag rank removed the rank epaulettes on the service dress on June 11, 2010, when the executive curl was reinstated with additional sleeve ribbon for the admiral ranks.

=== Changes: Navy ===
Naval rank titles remained for the personnel of the new Maritime Command. On the Canadian Forces service uniform, the rank insignia of officers up to the rank of naval Captain followed the old Royal Canadian Navy pattern but with the executive curl deleted. However, the executive curl was permitted on naval mess dress for all naval officers. In 1985 a new naval service uniform was announced and was introduced into service over the following three years. Admirals lost their sleeve ranks entirely and began wearing the maple leaf ranks on shoulder straps as their Army and Air Force counterparts.

For non-commissioned members, the unique naval anchor insignias were deleted and replaced with the same system as the Army and Air Force.

=== Changes: Army ===
While the insignia for non-commissioned personnel of the CF very closely matched that of the pre-unification army, there were some changes and new classes of ranks were created. The army had previously had general officers, officers, warrant officers, senior NCOs, junior NCOs, and men. All personnel that were not officers were referred to collectively as "other ranks". After unification, in mid 1980’s other ranks became known as non-commissioned members (NCMs). The category of senior NCOs now included only one rank – that of sergeant – whereas before it had included both staff sergeants and sergeants. There were also three grades of warrant officer, whereas immediately before unification there had been only two.

The appointments of lance corporal and lance sergeant were deleted. Originally, there were only privates and corporals below the rank of sergeant. Those corporals with leadership training came to be referred to as "B" corporals (for having completed Part B of the leadership training) and started to wear a crown over their two chevrons. Eventually the crown was changed to a maple leaf surmounting the chevrons, and the appointment of master corporal was created after much hostility and confusion within the ranks regarding who would be providing leadership at the lowest levels of Mobile Command (the new name for what used to be the Army).

Officers had their "pips and crowns" insignia deleted entirely and replaced with naval style bars or sleeve rings. General officers continued to wear their rank insignia on the shoulders, but now using maple leaves that were embroidered into the shoulder straps rather than the previous pin on metal devices.

=== Changes: Air Force ===
The distinctive air force rank titles were eliminated, and Air Command used the same rank titles and insignia as Mobile Command.

== Post-unification Canadian Forces ==
On June 11, 2010 the executive curl was reinstated for use by all naval officers, but the rank of midshipman was not reinstated, and the rank of naval cadet stayed on. The rank insignia for non-commissioned members continued to be based on army pattern insignia.

On 8 July 2013 the Minister of National Defence, Peter MacKay, announced that Canadian Army officers would once again wear "pips and crowns", signalling a return to the pre-unification rank insignia. The final product was a return to the rank insignia used before 1920 by the army, with the reinstatement of the brigadier-general insignia of crossed sabre and baton.

Peter MacKay, Minister of National Defence, announced on 8 July 2013 the Government of Canada's intent to restore Canadian Army rank insignia, names and badges to their traditional forms. The first stage was to be done before the end of the year for the officer corps, and resulted to a return to the pre-1968 rank insignia, but brigadier generals instead had the pre-1920 insignia (and not the 1928–66 insignia for brigadiers) reinstated. All other army officers had by November 11, 2014, insignia based on the old pre-1968 pattern. In 2016, the Canadian Army ordered that general officer rank insignia would be modified to a version of the insignia worn under the unification era, except that it would conform to the traditional Canadian Army style in using the same metal pin-on ranks as other Canadian Army officers instead of the slightly different cloth badging worn under unification.

In 2015 the rank of private was changed to aviator within the Royal Canadian Air Force. The RCAF insignia were also changed from gold to the grey/silver colouring that existed prior to unification. As this restoration aimed at carrying on the traditions of the RCAF, and also of the First World War–era Royal Flying Corps (and other CAF air branches), it did not signify a wholesale reversion to the post–Second World War–era RCAF ranks.

On April 1, 2016, the Canadian Army announced that it would use the maple leaf ranks for generals as well as reinstating gold sleeve braids on generals' tunic cuffs. The insignia, however, will use metal pin-ons instead of the unification cloth badges. To honour the centennial of the Battle of Vimy Ridge on 1 April 2017, the Vimy Star, composed of a red maple leaf within a gold diamond and surrounded by the army's Latin motto vigilamus pro te ("we stand on guard for thee", from the English lyrics of "O Canada"), replaced the Bath Star in officer shoulder boards.

== See also ==
- Canadian Armed Forces ranks and insignia
- Historic Royal Canadian Air Force ranks (1924–1968)
- Ranks and insignia of NATO
- List of comparative military ranks
- Comparative army officer ranks of the Americas
- Uniforms of the Canadian Armed Forces
- Cadets Canada Elemental Ranks
