= Lieutenant (Canada) =

Lieutenant Lieutenant
- Shoulder insignia Left: Canadian Army; Right: Royal Canadian Air Force
- Country: Canada
- Service branch: Canadian Army; Royal Canadian Air Force
- Abbreviation: Lt
- NATO rank code: OF-1(b)
- Next higher rank: Captain or Lieutenant(N))
- Next lower rank: Second lieutenant (Canada)
- Equivalent ranks: Sub-lieutenant in the Royal Canadian Navy

Lieutenant (Lt; French: Lieutenant, lt) is a Canadian Forces rank used by commissioned officers of the Canadian Army or Royal Canadian Air Force. Sub-lieutenant is the equivalent rank in the Royal Canadian Navy. Lieutenants and sub-lieutenants are equivalent to ranks with a NATO code of OF-1.

== Insignia ==
The rank insignia of a lieutenant in the Canadian Army is two pips. In the Royal Canadian Air Force, the insignia is one 1/2-inch (13 mm) stripe with a 1/4-inch (6.4 mm) stripe above it. The rank insignia of a sub-lieutenant is a 1/4-inch (6.4 mm) stripe with one 1/2-inch (13 mm) stripe with the executive curl above it. On CADPAT and flying uniforms, the insignia is white on army slip-ons and dark blue on air force slip-ons.

=== Canadian Army ===
Canadian Army(1902–1920)	Lieutenant
Canadian Army(1921–1953)	Lieutenant
Canadian Army(1953–1968)	Lieutenant
Mobile Command & Land Force Command(1968–2013)	
Canadian Army(2013–2017)	
Canadian Army(Present)	

=== Royal Canadian Air Force ===
Royal Canadian Air Force(1924-1968)
Air Command(1968–1984)
Air Command(1984–2014)
Royal Canadian Air Force(2014-present)

Rank titles(1924-1968)	Flying Officer (French: Lieutenant d’aviation)

== Pronunciation ==
The British pronunciation of the French word "lieutenant" (as "lef-tenant") is the official pronunciation as used by the Canadian Armed Forces, but the American pronunciation of "loo-tenant" (which is closer to the original French pronunciation) is sometimes heard outside of the military.
