= Comparative army officer ranks of the Americas =

All armies and land forces of North and South American states are listed in a rank comparison chart below.

== Officers ==
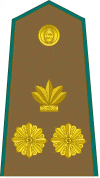
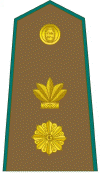
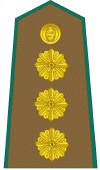
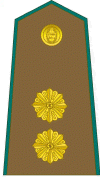
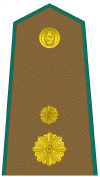
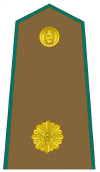
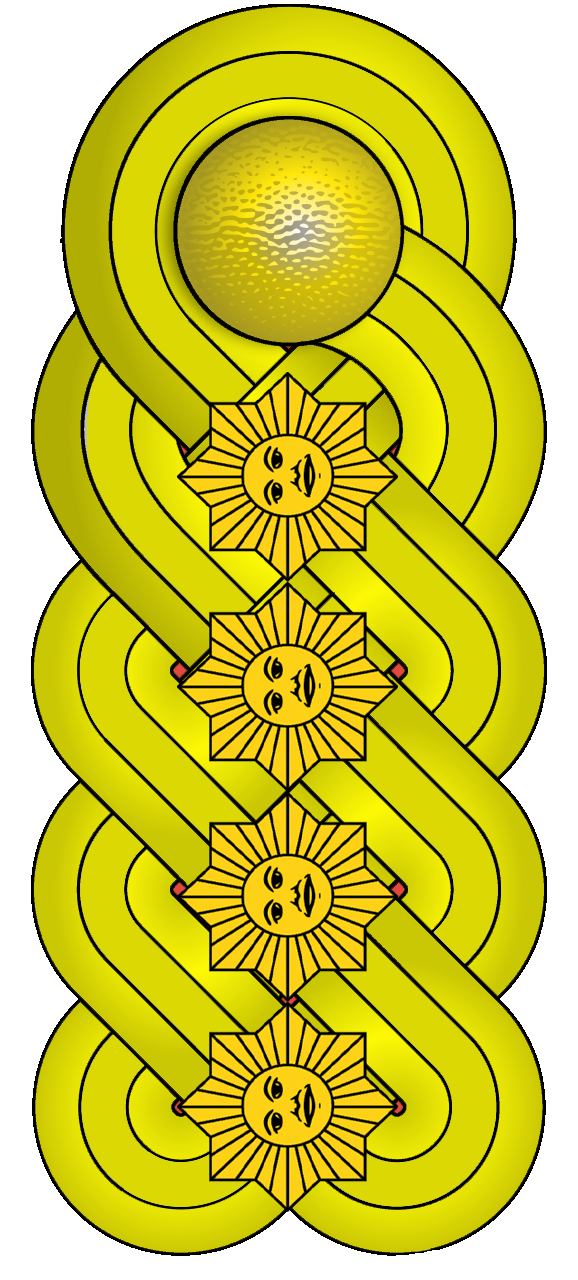
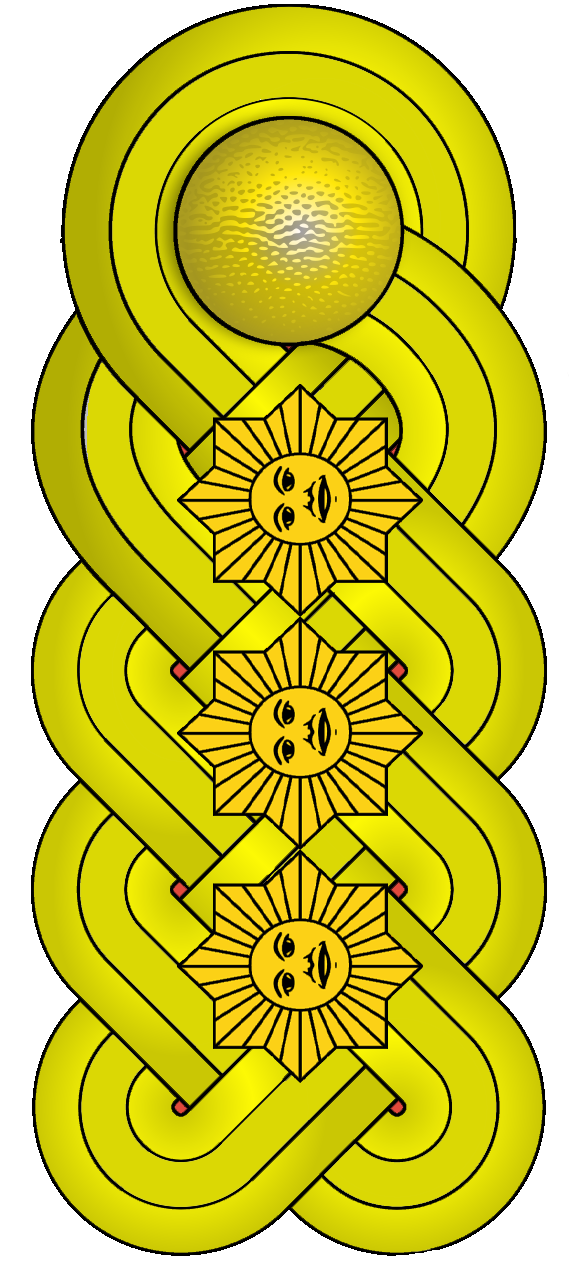
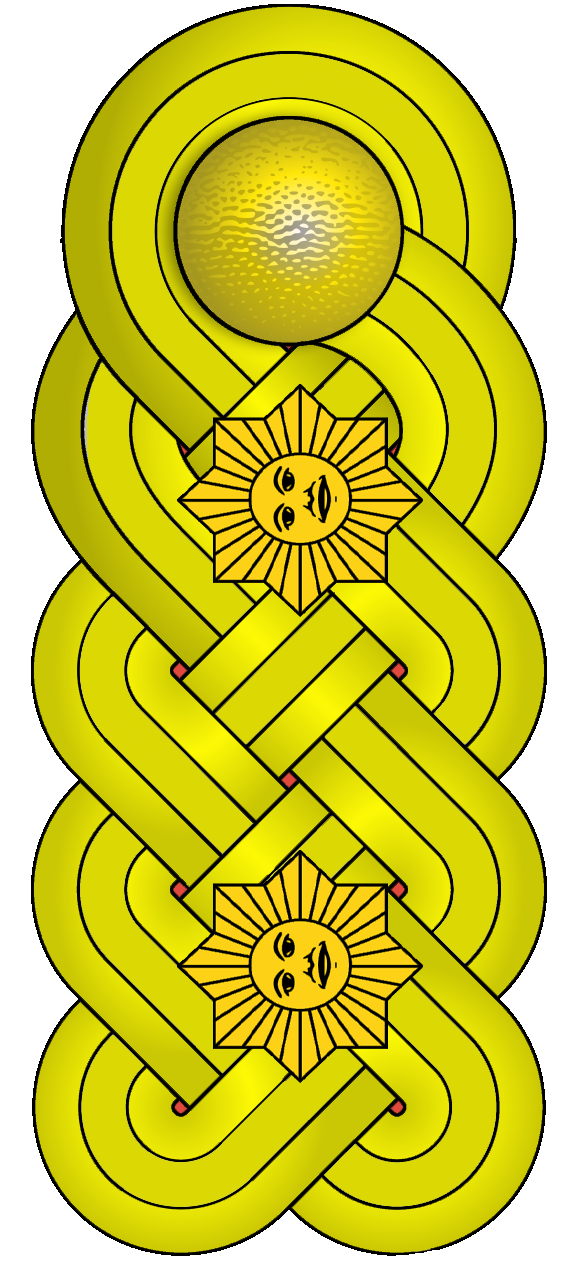
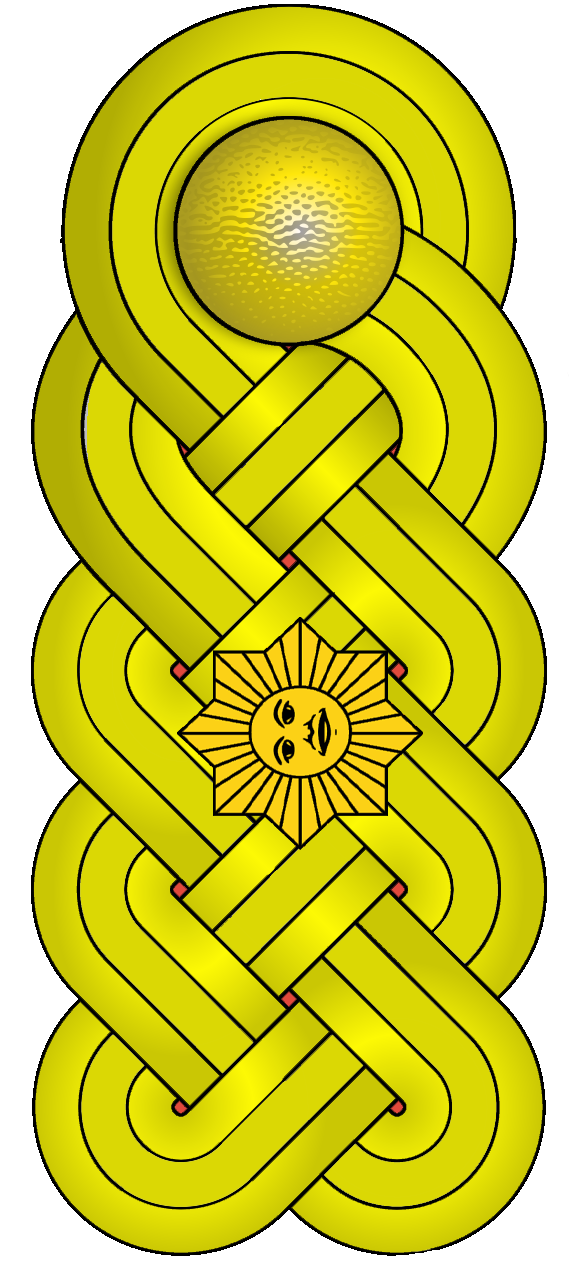
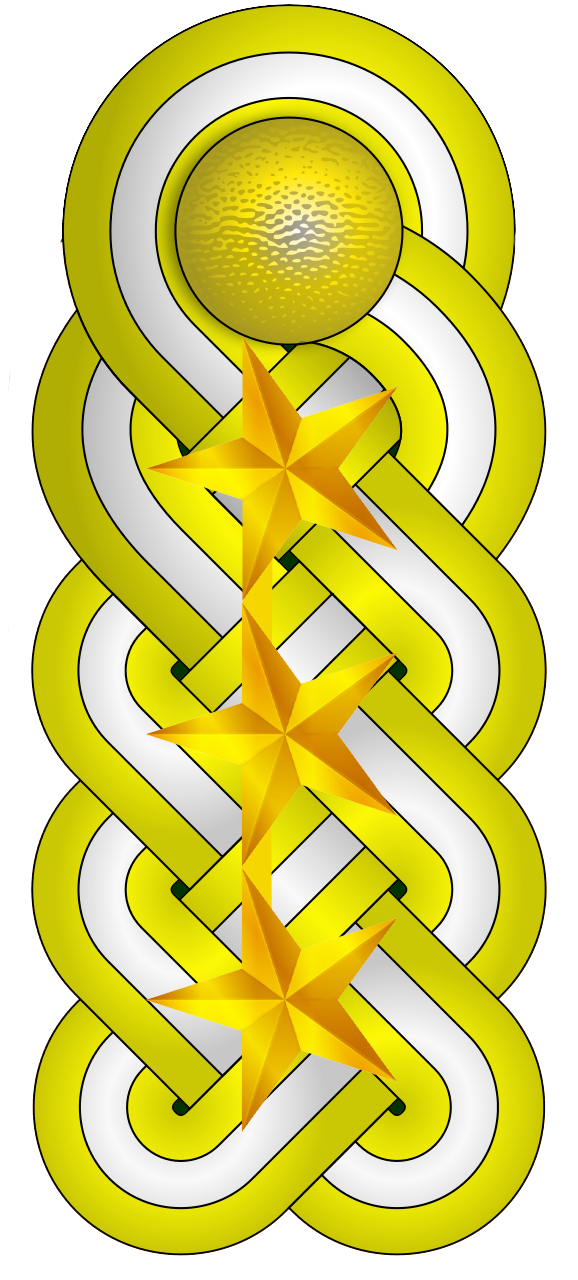
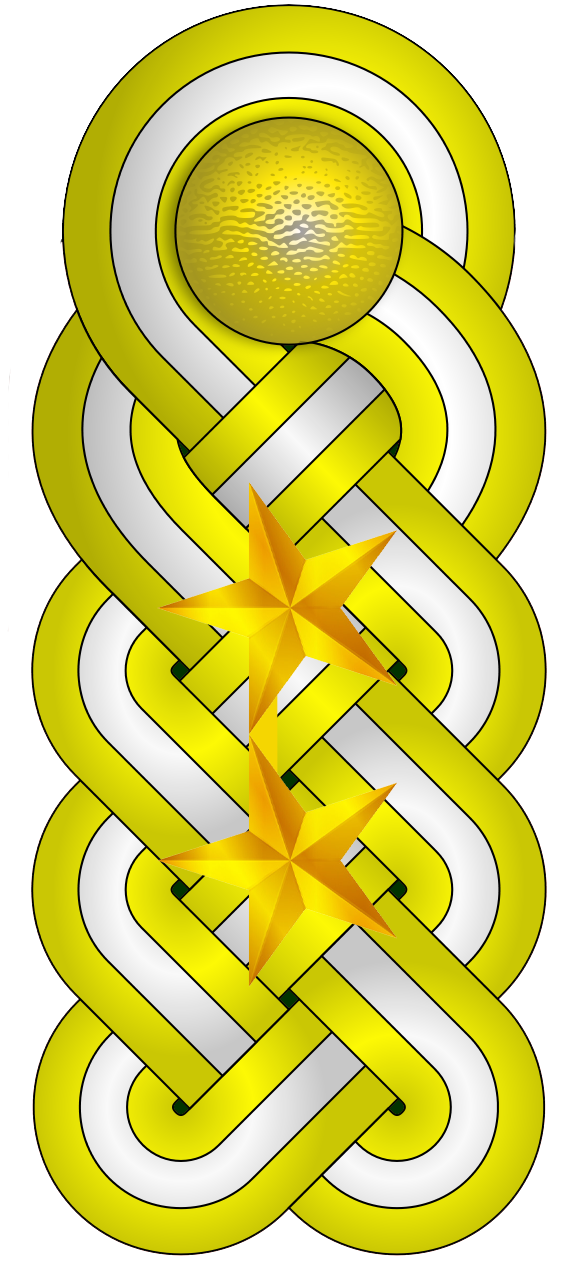
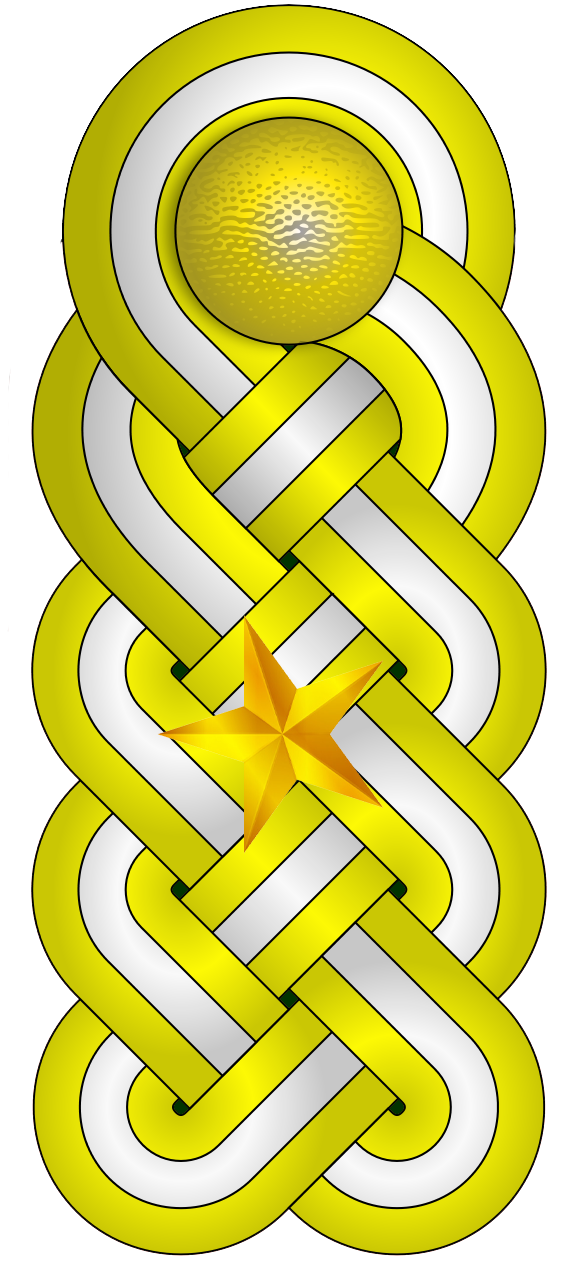
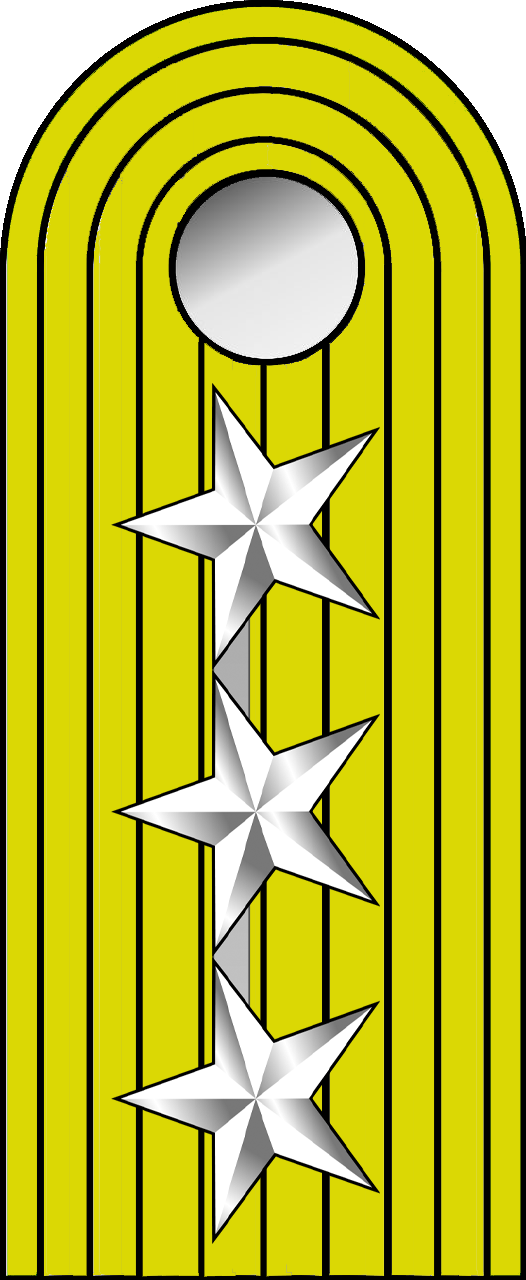
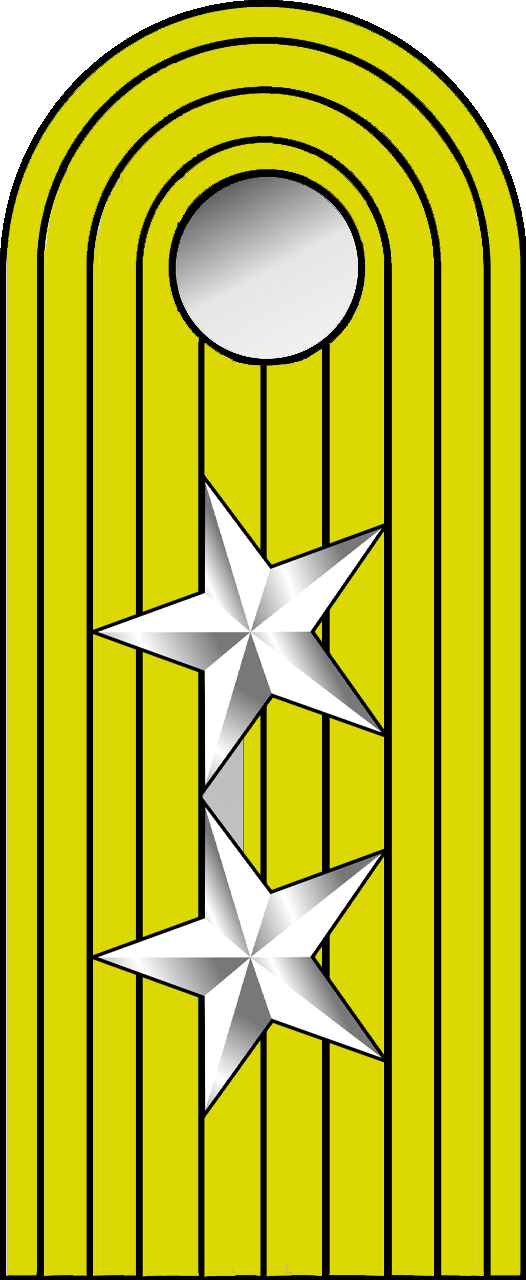
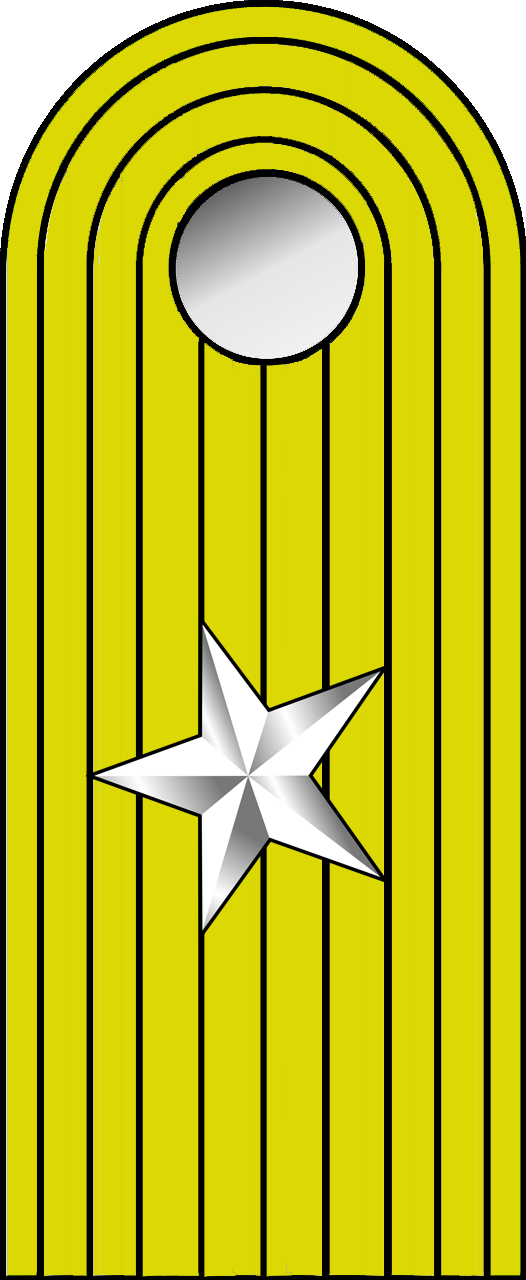
Rank group	General / flag officers					Senior officers				Junior officers
Antigua and Barbuda Regiment
Antigua and Barbuda Regiment						Colonel		Lieutenant colonel	Major	Captain		First lieutenant		Second lieutenant
Argentine Army
Argentine Army		Teniente general	General de división	General de brigada	Coronel mayor	Coronel		Teniente coronel	Mayor	Capitán		Teniente primero	Teniente	Subteniente
(The Bahamas) Bahamas	No army
Barbados Regiment
Barbados Regiment				Major general	Brigadier general	Colonel		Lieutenant colonel	Major	Captain		First lieutenant		Second lieutenant
Belize Defence Force
Belize Defence Force				Major-general	Brigadier general	Colonel		Lieutenant colonel	Major	Captain		Lieutenant		Second lieutenant
Bolivian Army
Bolivian Army		General de ejército	General de división	General de brigada		Coronel		Teniente coronel	Mayor	Captáin		Teniente		Subteniente
Brazilian Army
Brazilian Army	Marechal	General de exército	General de divisão	General de brigada		Coronel		Tenente-coronel	Major	Capitão		Primeiro tenente		Segundo tenente
Canadian Army
Canadian Army		General	Lieutenant-general	Major-general	Brigadier-general	Colonel		Lieutenant-colonel	Major	Captain		Lieutenant		Second lieutenant
Canadian Army		Général(e)	Lieutenant(e)-général(e)	Major(e)-général(e)	Brigadier(ère)-général(e)	Colonel(le)		Lieutenant(e)-colonel(le)	Major(e)	Capitaine		Lieutenant(e)		Sous-lieutenant(e)
Chilean Army
Chilean Army		General de ejército	General de división	General de brigada	Brigadier	Coronel		Teniente coronel	Mayor	Capitán		Teniente	Subteniente	Alférez
Colombian National Army
Colombian National Army		General de ejército		Mayor general	Brigadier general	Coronel		Teniente coronel	Mayor	Capitán		Teniente		Subteniente
Rank group	General / flag officers					Senior officers				Junior officers
Costa Rica	No army
Cuban Revolutionary Army
Cuban Revolutionary Army		General de ejército	General de cuerpo de ejército	General de división	General de brigada	Primer coronel	Coronel	Teniente coronel	Mayor	Capitán		Primer teniente	Teniente	Subteniente
Dominica	No army
Dominican Army
Dominican Army			Teniente general	Mayor general	General de brigada	Coronel		Teniente coronel	Mayor	Capitán		Primer teniente		Segundo teniente
Ecuadorian Army
Ecuadorian Army		General de ejército	General de división	General de brigada		Coronel		Teniente coronel	Mayor	Capitán		Teniente		Subteniente
Salvadoran Army
Salvadoran Army		General de ejército	General de división	General de brigada	Brigadier	Coronel		Teniente coronel	Mayor	Capitán		Teniente		Subteniente
Grenada	No army
Guatemalan Army
Guatemalan Army				General de división	General de brigada	Coronel		Teniente coronel	Mayor	Capitán primero	Capitán segundo	Teniente		Subteniente
Guyana Army
Guyana Army	Commander-in-Chief	Minister of Defence		Major general	Brigadier	Colonel		Lieutenant colonel	Major	Captain		Lieutenant	Second lieutenant	Ensign
Haitian Army
Haitian Army			Lieutenant général	Major général	Général de brigade	Colonel		Lieutenant-colonel	Major	Capitaine		Lieutenant		Sous-lieutenant
Haitian Army			Lyetnan jeneral	Majò jeneral	Jeneral brigad	Kolonèl		Lyetnan kolonèl	Majò	Kapitèn		Lyetnan		Soulyetnan
Honduran Army
Honduran Army				General de división	General de brigada	Coronel		Teniente coronel	Mayor	Capitán		Teniente		Subteniente
Jamaican Army
Jamaican Army			Lieutenant general	Major general	Brigadier	Colonel		Lieutenant colonel	Major	Captain		Lieutenant		Second lieutenant
Mexican Army
Mexican Army		Secretario de la defensa nacional	General de división	General de brigada	General brigadier	Coronel		Teniente coronel	Mayor	Capitan primero	Capitán segundo	Teniente		Subteniente
Rank group	General / flag officers					Senior officers				Junior officers
Nicaraguan Army
Nicaraguan Army		General de ejército	Coronel general	Mayor general	General de brigada	Coronel		Teniente coronel	Mayor	Capitán		Teniente primero		Teniente
Panama	No army
Paraguayan Army
Paraguayan Army		General de ejército	General de división	General de brigada		Coronel		Teniente coronel	Mayor	Capitán		Teniente primero	Teniente	Subteniente
Peruvian Army
Peruvian Army	Gran Mariscal del Perú	General de ejército	General de división	General de brigada		Coronel		Teniente coronel	Mayor	Capitán		Teniente		Subteniente
SKN Regiment
SKN Regiment								Lieutenant-colonel	Major	Captain		Lieutenant		Second lieutenant
Saint Lucia	No army
Saint Vincent and the Grenadines	No army
Suriname Army
Suriname Army					Brigadegeneraal	Kolonel		Luitenant-kolonel	Majoor	Kapitein/ Ritmeester		Eerste luitenant		Tweede luitenant
Trinidad and Tobago Regiment
Trinidad and Tobago Regiment				Major general	Brigadier general	Colonel		Lieutenant colonel	Major	Captain		Lieutenant		Second lieutenant
United States Army
United States Army	General of the Army	General	Lieutenant general	Major general	Brigadier general	Colonel		Lieutenant colonel	Major	Captain		First lieutenant		Second lieutenant
National Army of Uruguay
National Army of Uruguay		General de ejército		General		Coronel		Teniente coronel	Mayor	Capitán		Teniente primero	Teniente segundo	Alférez
Venezuelan Army
Venezuelan Army		General en jefe	Mayor general	General de division	General de brigada	Coronel		Teniente coronel	Mayor	Capitán		Primer teniente		Teniente
Rank group	General / flag officers					Senior officers				Junior officers

== See also ==
- Comparative army officer ranks of Asia
- Comparative army officer ranks of Europe
- Ranks and insignia of NATO armies officers
