= Chief petty officer, 1st class =

Chief petty officer, 1st class – rank insignia

Chief petty officer, 1st class (CPO1) is the most senior non-commissioned member (NCM) rank of the Royal Canadian Navy (RCN). It is equivalent to a chief warrant officer (CWO) in the Canadian Army and Royal Canadian Air Force. It is immediately senior to the rank of chief petty officer, 2nd class and its equivalents, master warrant officer. It is part of the cadre of warrant officers.

The French language form of the rank is premier maître de 1^{re} classe (pm 1).

== Insignia ==
The rank insignia of the CPO1 is the arms of Canada, worn on both forearms of the service dress tunic and on slip-ons on both shoulders of other uniforms. Unlike other chiefs and petty officers, CPO1s wear the cap insignia of naval officers, although the brim of the peak cap remains plain, the same as other naval NCMs.

== Forms of address ==
CPO1s are generally initially addressed as "Chief Petty Officer Bloggins" or "Chief Bloggins", and thereafter as "Chief", although in correspondence the full rank or abbreviation is used before the member's name. The coxswain of an RCN ship will be answered as "Coxswain" (e.g. "yes, Coxswain" or "no, Coxswain") The full appellation "Chief Petty Officer 1st Class" in speech is generally used only when the "first class" distinction must be made, such as to distinguish between members with similar names but differing ranks, or on promotion parades. CPO1s are never addressed as "Sir" or "Ma'am", regardless of the protocol for their army and air force equivalents; in naval tradition, the titles "Sir" and "Ma'am" are reserved for officers.

== Appointments ==
One of the normal appointments of a CPO1 is that of coxswain, the senior NCM on a ship; it is roughly analogous to an army regimental sergeant-major (RSM). Due to the unified nature of the CF, however, it is not unheard-of for CPO1s — especially those of the "purple trades", such as logistics or military police to find themselves filling the appointment of RSM in what are otherwise considered "hard" army units (such as service battalions).

CPO1s may also hold appointments as the senior NCM in a larger formations or on a base; these appointments, and their respective insignia, include:

- Base chief petty officer (BCPO) — the coat of arms over the central insignia of the badge of the Canadian Armed Forces (an anchor, crossed swords and an eagle).
- Fleet chief petty officer (Fleet CPO) — the coat of arms over the central insignia of the badge of the Canadian Armed Forces (an anchor, crossed swords and an eagle).
- Formation chief petty officer — the coat of arms over the central insignia of the badge of the Canadian Armed Forces (an anchor, crossed swords and an eagle).
- Chief petty officer of the navy (CCPO) — the coat of arms with a wreath of laurel wrapped around the base
- Canadian Forces chief warrant officer (CFCWO) — the coat of arms with a wreath of twenty-eight maple leaves wrapped around the base and sides. The title of this highest non-commissioned position in the Canadian Forces is not, however, ever referred to as "Canadian Forces chief petty officer" if the incumbent is from the navy.
Base/Fleet/Formation Chief Petty Officer

CCPO

CFCWO

== Messes and quarters ==
CPO1s generally mess and billet with petty officers and other chief petty officers, and their army and air force equivalents, warrant officers and sergeants. Their mess on naval bases or installations are generally named the "Chiefs and POs Mess".

== See also ==
- Non-commissioned officer
