= Chief petty officer, 2nd class =

Chief petty officer, 2nd class, CPO2, is a Naval non-commissioned member rank of the Canadian Forces. It is senior to the rank of petty officer 1st-class and its equivalents, and junior to chief petty officer 1st-class and its equivalents. Its Army and Air Force equivalent is master warrant officer (MWO), and is part of the cadre of warrant officers.

The French language form is premier maître de 2me classe (pm 2).

== Insignia ==
Royal Canadian Navy CPO2

The rank insignia of the CPO2 is a crown within a wreath of laurel, worn on both forearms of the Service Dress tunic and on slip-ons on both shoulders of other uniforms. They wear the same cap insignia as petty officers: a foul anchor surrounded by a wreath of laurel, surmounted by a crown.

== Forms of address ==
CPO2s are generally initially addressed as "Chief Petty Officer Bloggins" or "Chief Bloggins", and thereafter as "Chief", although in correspondence the full rank or abbreviation is used before the member's name. The full appellation "Chief Petty Officer 2nd Class" in speech is generally used only when the "second class" distinction must be made, such as to distinguish between members with similar names but differing ranks, or on promotion parades. CPO2s are never addressed as "Sir" or "Ma'am", regardless of the protocol for their Army and Air Force equivalents; in Naval tradition, the titles "Sir" and "Ma'am" are reserved for officers.

== Appointments ==
Due to the unified nature of the CF, it is not unheard-of for CPO2s — especially those of the so-called "purple trades", such as logistics or military police — to find themselves filling the appointment of Squadron or Company Sergeant-Major in what are otherwise considered "hard" army units (such as Service Battalions).

== Messes and quarters ==
CPO2s generally mess and billet with Petty Officers and other Chief Petty Officers, and their Army and Air Force equivalents, Warrant Officers and Sergeants. Their mess on naval bases or installations are generally named the "Chiefs and POs Mess".

== See also ==
- Non-commissioned member
- Warrant Officer
- Chief Petty Officer
- Non-commissioned officer
