= Lieutenant-commander (Canada) =

In the Canadian Armed Forces (CAF), lieutenant-commander (LCdr) (French: capitaine de corvette or capc) is a rank for officers who wear navy uniform, equal to a major for officers who wear army or air force uniform. Most officers of this rank are under the command of the Royal Canadian Navy, but some are employed by other commands of the CAF. Lieutenant-commander is the lowest rank of the senior officer rank grouping. Lieutenant-commanders are senior to lieutenants (N) and to army and air force captains, and are junior to commanders and lieutenant colonels.

Following Royal Navy practice, promotion to the rank of lieutenant-commander was previously automatic following the accumulation of eight years' seniority as a lieutenant (N). That practice changed in the mid-1990s, after which lieutenant-commander appointments were limited and subject to competition.

Typical appointments for a lieutenant-commander include:

- Commanding officer of a minor warship, submarine or reserve division.
- Executive officer or head of department of a frigate, destroyer, supply ship, reserve division, or training establishment.
- Staff officer on a formation or task group headquarters staff.

The rank insignia for a lieutenant-commander is two 1/2-inch (1.3 cm) stripes with a 1/4-inch (0.6 cm) stripe between, worn on the cuffs of the service dress jacket, and on slip-ons on other uniforms. As senior officers, they wear one row of gold oak leaves along the edge of the visor of their service caps. Lieutenant-commanders of the Naval Operations Branch wear the officer's pattern of the branch cap badge: an anchor on a black oval, surrounded by a wreath of maple leaves at the sides and base of the oval, the whole surmounted by St Edward's Crown. Specialist officers in such branches as Logistics, Intelligence and Medical wear their branch cap badges.

Prior to the unification of the Canadian Forces in 1968, rank structure and insignia followed the British pattern. As part of the Canadian naval centennial, the executive curl pattern (shown only in the dress uniform tunic picture below) of naval officers' rank was returned to all uniforms in 2010.

Navy uniform variations

Dress uniform tunic

Uniform shirts (old insignia)

Shoulder boards for short-sleeve shirt and tropical white tunic (old insignia)

CADPAT uniform (old insignia)

== See also ==
- Canadian Forces ranks and insignia
