= Non-commissioned member =

Term in the Canadian armed forces

A non-commissioned member (NCM), in the Canadian Armed Forces, is defined in the Queen's Regulations and Orders as: "... any person, other than an officer, who is enrolled in, or who pursuant to law is attached or seconded otherwise than as an officer to, the Canadian Forces..." Thus, an NCM is any member who is not a commissioned officer or officer cadet. Officer cadets, while not commissioned members, are classified as officers.

The equivalent term in French is militaire du rang.

NCMs are skilled personnel that provide operational and support services in the CAF. They start out as recruits, and are trained to do specific jobs.

== Composition ==
Non-commissioned members comprise the following groups of ranks:

Rank group	Army / special operations forces	Navy	Air force
Warrant officers	Chief warrant officer (CWO)	Chief petty officer 1st class (CPO1)	Chief warrant officer (CWO)
Warrant officers	Master warrant officer (MWO)	Chief petty officer 2nd class (CPO2)	Master warrant officer (MWO)
Warrant officers	Warrant officer (WO)	Petty officer 1st class (PO1)	Warrant officer (WO)
Non-commissioned officers	Sergeant (Sgt)	Petty officer 2nd class (PO2)	Sergeant (Sgt)
Non-commissioned officers	Master corporal (MCpl)	Master sailor (MS)	Master corporal (MCpl)
Non-commissioned officers	Corporal (Cpl)	Sailor first class (S1)	Corporal (Cpl)
Privates	Private (Pte)	Sailor second class (S2)	Aviator (Avr)
Privates	Private (basic) (Pte)(B)	Sailor third class (S3)	Aviator (basic) (Avr)(B)

Non-commissioned officers are further subdivided into "junior non-commissioned officers" (Jr NCOs), consisting of the ranks of MCpl/MS and Cpl/LS, and "senior non-commissioned officers" (Sr NCOs), consisting of Sgt/PO2.

The ranks of MCpl/MS (MCpl/MS is an appointment given to a Cpl) and below are also collectively known as "junior ranks" (JRs). There is no equivalent simple collective term for Sgt/PO2 and above; they are generally known by the terms "warrant officers and sergeants" (army, air force and special operations forces) and "chiefs and petty officers" or "chiefs and POs" (navy); the term "senior NCM" is often erroneously used, and currently has no official sanction, although its use (and other unofficial terms like "junior NCMs") are appearing in official documentation with increasing frequency.

== Analogues ==
In the British Army, Royal Marines and Royal Air Force (and in the armies and air forces of many other Commonwealth countries), the equivalent term is "other rank" (OR); in the Royal Navy and other Commonwealth navies, the term is usually "rating" or "rate".

In the United States Army, Air Force and Marines, the equivalent term is "enlisted rank." In the United States Navy, the proper term is "rate" only; "rating" refers to a sailor's military occupational specialty.

== See also ==
- Enlisted rank
- Naval rating
- Non-commissioned officer
- Other ranks
