= Enlisted rank =

Rank below that of a commissioned officer

An enlisted rank (also known as an enlisted grade or enlisted rate or enlisted man) is, in some armed services, any rank below that of a commissioned officer. The term can be inclusive of non-commissioned officers or warrant officers, except in United States military usage where warrant officers and chief warrant officers are a separate officer category ranking above enlisted grades and below commissioned officer grades. In most cases, enlisted service personnel perform jobs specific to their own occupational specialty, as opposed to the more generalized command responsibilities of commissioned officers.

The term "enlistment" refers solely to a military commitment (whether officer or enlisted) whereas the terms "taken on strength" and "struck off strength" refer to a service member being carried on a given unit's roll.

== Canadian Armed Forces ==
In the Canadian Armed Forces, the term non-commissioned member (NCM) is used.

== North Atlantic Treaty Organization ==
For the ranks used by the North Atlantic Treaty Organization, non-commissioned ranks are coded OR1–OR9 (bottom to top), OR being an abbreviation for Other Ranks.

== U.S. Department of Defense ==
The U.S. services all use the same "E-" designation for enlisted pay grades, with service-specific names applied to each (e.g., chief petty officer, master gunnery sergeant, private first class). Each branch incorporates it as part of a service member's job specialty designator. In the United States Air Force, this job specialty designator is known as an Air Force Specialty Code, in the United States Army and United States Marine Corps, a Military Occupational Specialty, and in the United States Navy and United States Coast Guard, a rating.

== See also ==
- List of comparative military ranks
