= Purple trades =

In the Canadian Armed Forces, the purple trades are occupations and careers that are not strongly linked to one of the three major 'environments' or 'elements': sea, land, or air. Purple trades include – but are not limited to – those associated with logistics, administration, medicine, justice, and chaplains.

== Origin of the phrase ==
Following the amalgamation of Canada's military branches (navy, army and air force) into a single command structure in 1968, all members of the unified Canadian Forces adopted a standard set of uniform styles and colours.

In the 1980s, the Canadian Forces – while remaining fully unified – assigned each of its members to one of three 'environments': sea, land, or air. This assignment was based on the individual's trade; pilots would be assigned to air, for example, while a grenadier would be assigned to land. Associated with each 'environment' assignment would be a particular set of uniform styles and colours: collectively, the distinctive environmental uniform (DEU).

Individuals whose trades weren't directly and obviously linked to specific environments – doctors, purchasing clerks, military police, etc. – might find themselves assigned to any one of the three environments. A fighter aircraft wing might end up with a medic in navy black and a procurement clerk in army green. As working in the occupation is often barely different, if at all, from one element to another, soldiers, sailors and aircrew are often placed on the same service branch or trade-specific course. As for the colour purple, it is a combination of red (army), dark blue (navy) and light blue (air force).
