= Captain (Canadian army and air force) =

Officer rank of the Canadian Armed Forces

- Army and air force insignia
- Country: Canada
- Service branch: Canadian Armed Forces
- NATO rank code: OF-2
- Equivalent ranks: Lieutenant (N)

Captain is a rank in the Canadian Armed Forces for officers who wear the army, air force, or special operations uniform. It is the highest rank of junior officer, above lieutenant and below major.

The equivalent rank for officers who wear the navy uniform is lieutenant (N). The naval rank of captain (N) corresponds to colonel. When the naval rank captain is written or typed, it is followed by "(N)" to distinguish it from army, air force and special operations captains.

On army and special operations uniforms, the rank insignia of a captain is three pips. On air force uniforms, the rank insignia of a captain is two wide bars.

Prior to the unification of the Canadian Forces in 1968, the Royal Canadian Air Force used the rank of flight lieutenant.

== See also ==
- Captain (armed forces)
