= Gapyeong Canada Monument =

Korean tribute to Canada's contribution during the Korean War

Gapyeong Canada Monument Canadian Korean War Memorial Garden
- Historic Sites and Monuments Board of Canada
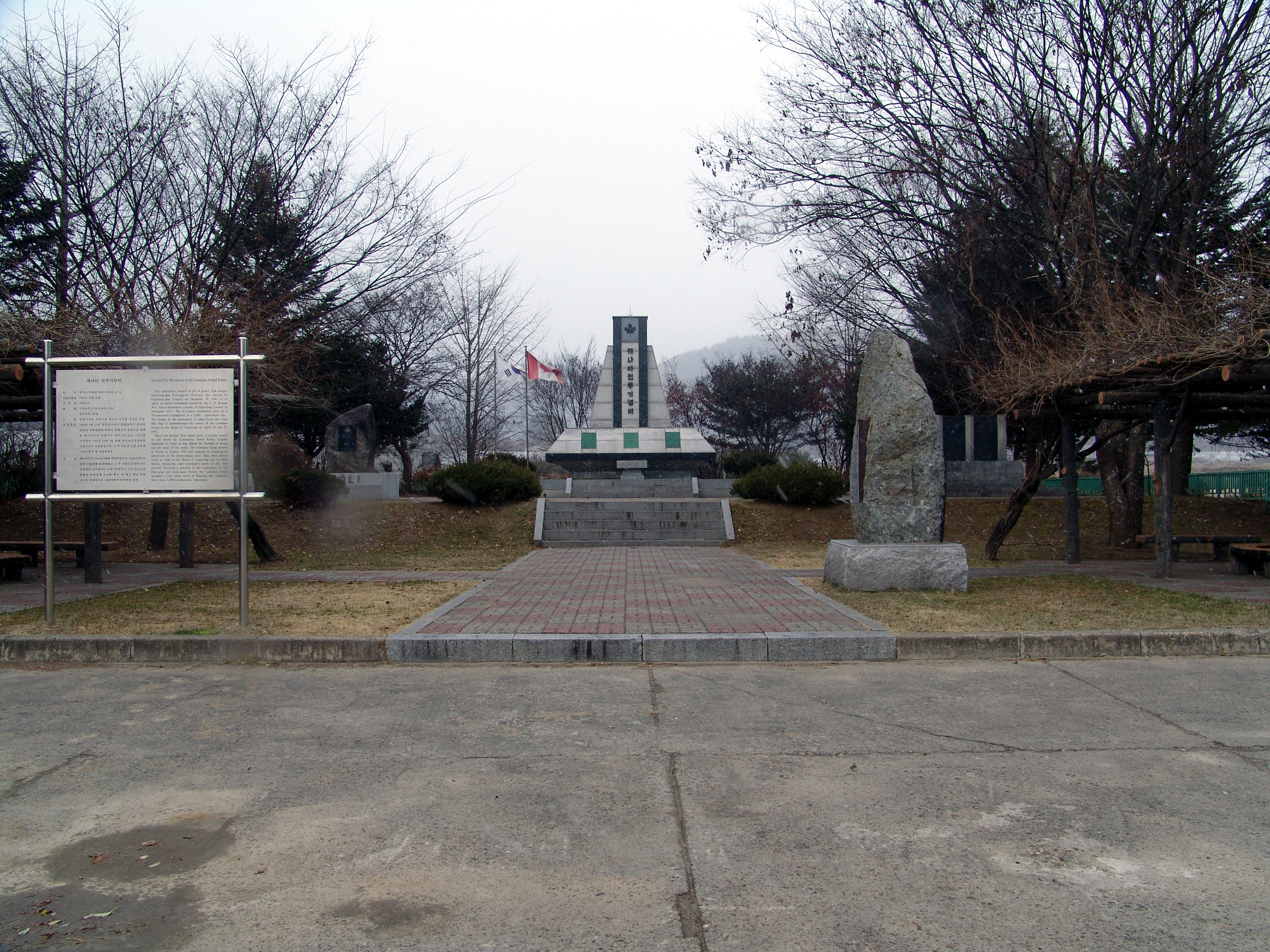
- The Gapyeong Canada Monument
- For Canadian contribution to the Korean War
- Established: November 7, 1975
- Unveiled: December 30, 1983
- Location: 37°52′37″N 127°31′49″E near Naechon
- Commemorated: 516 dead and 1,255 wounded
- ALTOGETHER 26,791 CANADIANS SERVED IN THE KOREAN WAR AND ANOTHER 7,000 SERVED IN THE THEATRE BETWEEN THE CEASE-FIRE AND THE END OF 1955

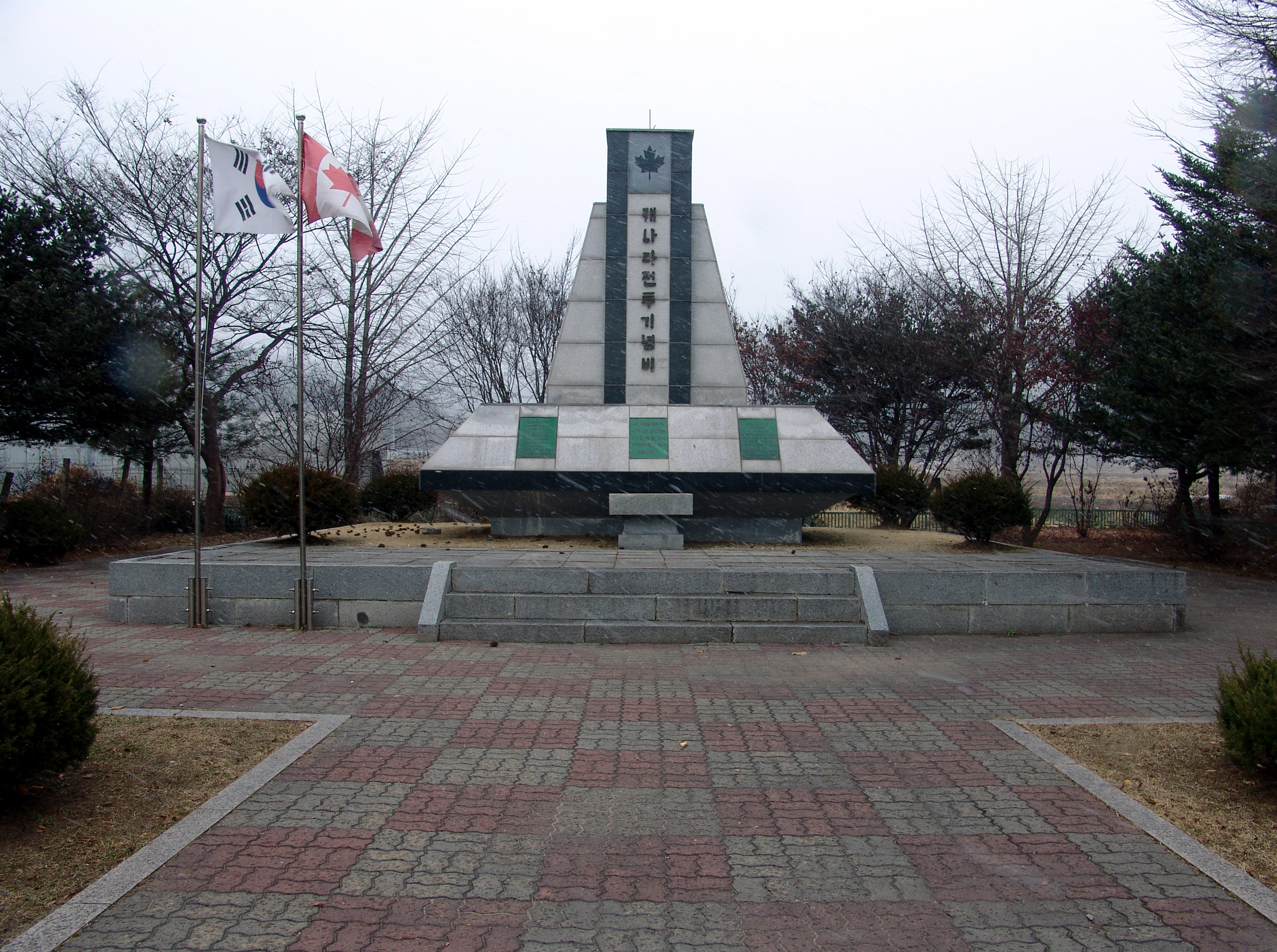
The Main Monument

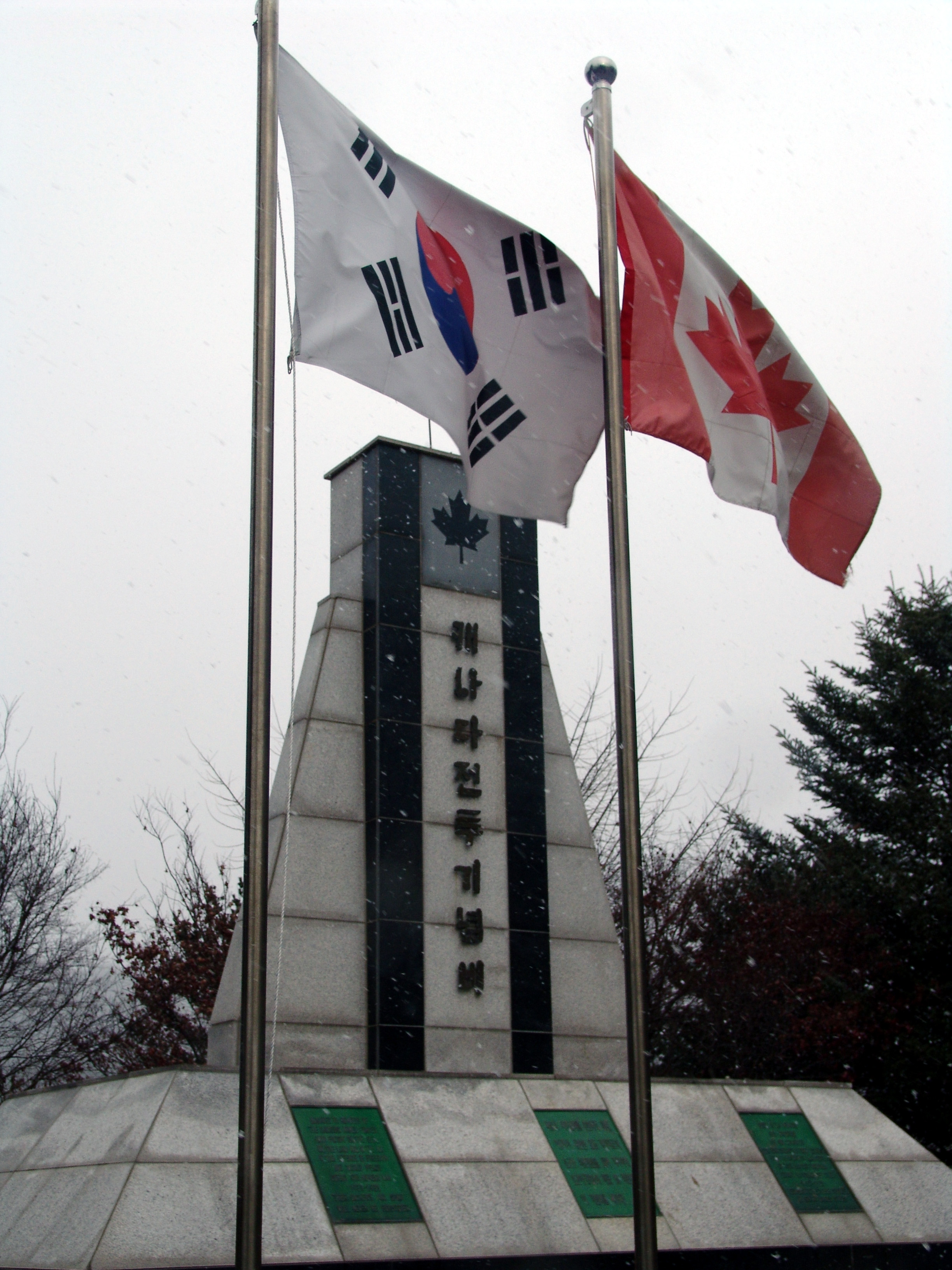
The Flags

The Gapyeong Canada Monument (Korean: 캐나다 전투 기념비) is a monument erected to commemorate the sacrifice of the Canadian Forces during the Korean War, especially at the Battle of Kapyong in the Canadian Korean War Memorial Garden. The English text describing the monument reads as follows:

Korean War Monument to the Canadian Armed Forces

This monument, located at 207-4 Igokri. Puk-myeon, Gapyeong-gun Gyeonggi-do Province, was erected by Gapyeong-gun, County on December 30, 1983 to replace an earlier monument erected by the U. N. Korean War Allies monument citizens of Gapyeong County in November 1975. The 6.5-meter monument rests on a 70-centimeter foundation in a 1,688 squaremeter site. The design of the monument is taken from the Canadian flag. It commemorates the victory of the Canadian troops in the Battle of Gapyeong on April 24 and 25, 1951.

When the Korean War began with a surprise attack on the South by Communist North Korea, Canada dispatched its forces to help defend the freedom of Korea and the peace of the world. The Canadian troops arrived in Korea in August 1950 and engaged in mopping up operations in the Samnyangjin area. They then moved north to fight in the Battle of Gapyeong and in other battles, advancing eight kilometers north of the 38th parallel. Securing a position at the confluence of the Han-gang and Imjim-gang Rivers, the Canadian troops occupied a high point north of Kaesong and conducted more than 1,000 reconnaissance operations.

When one walks toward the monument, at the left is a panel explaining the history of the monument while at the right is a description of the Canadian contribution to the Korean War. The main monument is centred at the far end alongside both a Korean and Canadian flag. The main monument is flanked left by the monument dedicated to the 2nd Battalion Princess Patricia's Canadian Light Infantry (PPCLI) and the battle on Hill 677 and flanked on the right with another monument naming all the Canadian units that participated in the Korean War.

== The Main monument ==
The main monument was erected December 30, 1983 and its English text reads as follows:

Dedicated to members of the Canadian Armed Forces who fought on the sea, on the land and in the air in the defence of freedom and world peace during the Korean War 1950–1953 their sacrifice and spirit will never be forgotten

== PPCLI monument ==
At the left of the main monument lies the monument dedicated to the 2nd Battalion of the Princess Patricia Canadian Light Infantry for their actions during the Battle of Kapyong on April 24 and 25 1951, actions that had them decorated with the United States Presidential Unit Citation. This monument was erected November 7, 1975.

== Canadian contribution to the Korean War ==
The two rightmost monument describe the Canadian contribution to the Korean war. The front monument reads as follows:

Between 1950 and 1953, Canada participated in the Korean War as part of a United Nations multinational force to protect South Korea from invasion by North Korea. When considered in proportion to the population of the country, Canada's army, navy and air force formed one of the largest contingents of the United Nations forces. Some 27,000 Canadians left behind the comforts of home in the interests of peace and security in a region far removed from their own country. Five hundred and sixteen of them gave their lives in the name of this noble cause. Recognized for their military skills and the recipients of many military decorations, these valiant Canadians embodied their country's commitments to safeguard the fundamental principles of the United Nations.

The rear monument goes into details, listing the units that participated in the Korean war as well as the size of the contribution: 26,791 Canadians during the war itself, 7,000 until 1955 with 516 dead and 1,255 wounded. The units that served are:

- Royal Canadian Navy
  - HMCS Athabaskan
  - HMCS Cayuga
  - HMCS Sioux
  - HMCS Nootka
  - HMCS Huron
  - HMCS Iroquois
  - HMCS Crusader
  - HMCS Haida
- Army
  - Lord Strathcona's Horse (Royal Canadians)
  - 2nd Field Regiment (FD Regt.) and 1st Regt. Royal Canadian Horse Artillery
  - 81st FD Regt. Royal Canadian Artillery
  - The Corps of Royal Canadian Engineers
  - The Royal Canadian Corps of Signals
  - The Royal Canadian Regiment
    - 2nd. 1st and 3rd Battalions
  - Princess Patricia's Canadian Light Infantry
    - 2nd. 1st and 3rd Battalions
  - Royal 22^{e} Régiment
    - 2nd. 1st and 3rd Battalions
  - The Royal Canadian Army Service Corps
  - The Royal Canadian Army Medical Corps
  - The Royal Canadian Army Dental Corps
  - Royal Canadian Army Ordnance Corps
  - The Corps of Royal Canadian Electrical and Mechanical Engineers
  - Royal Canadian Army Pay Corps
  - The Royal Canadian Postal Corps
  - Royal Canadian Army Chaplain Corps
  - The Canadian Provost Corps
  - Canadian Intelligence Corps
- Royal Canadian Air Force
  - No. 426 (Thunderbird) Squadron

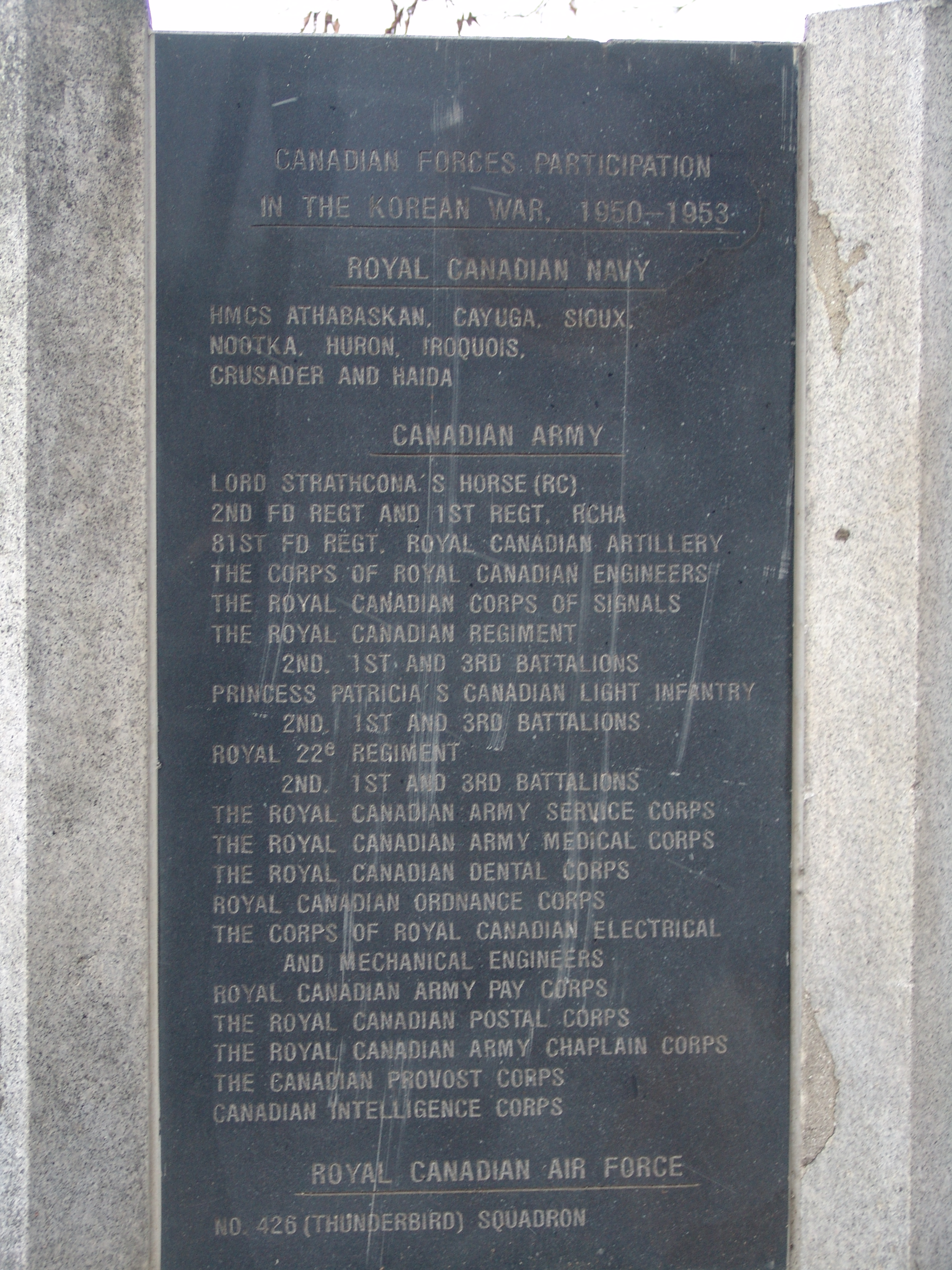
Left panel of the contribution monument

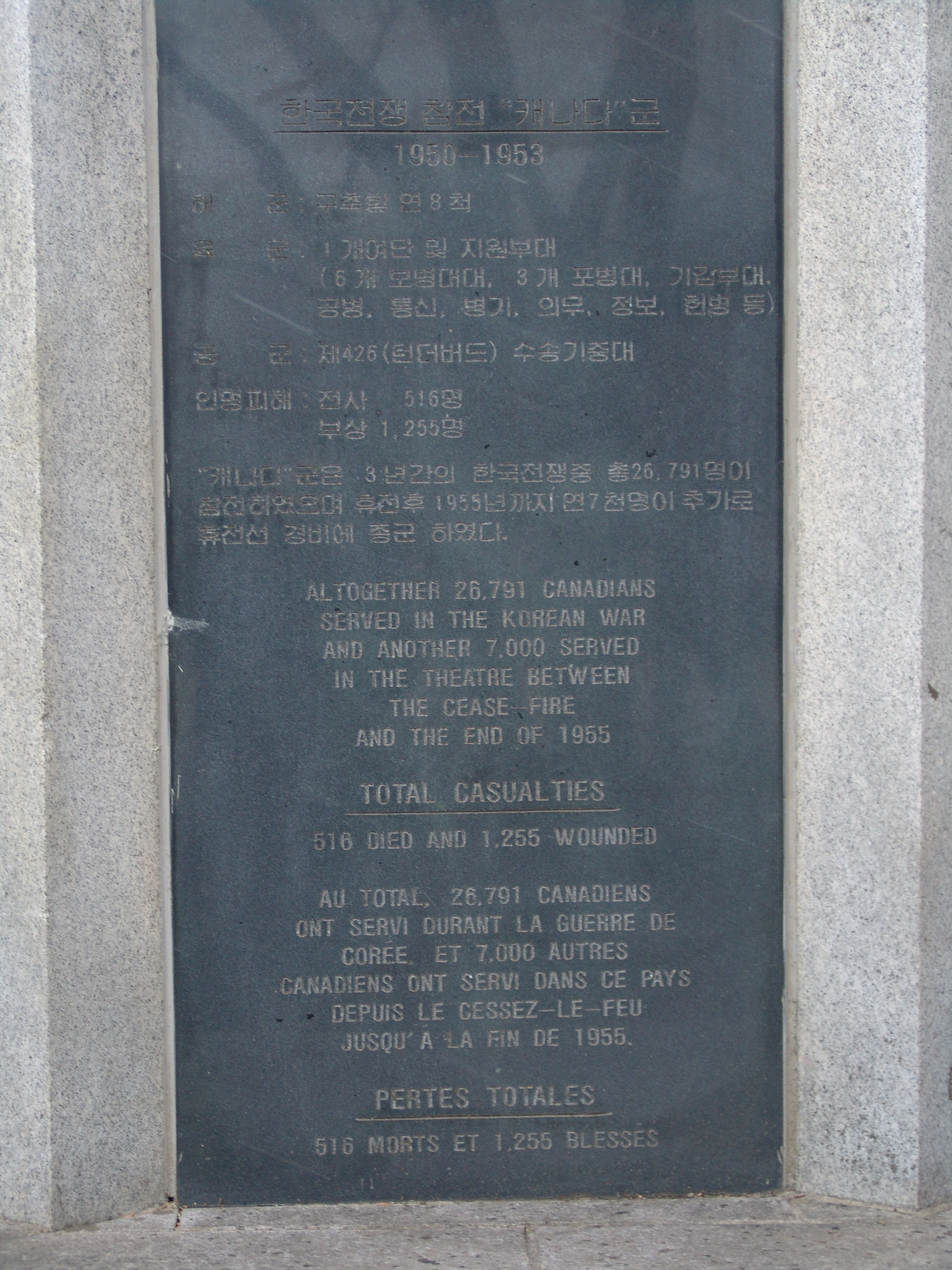
Middle panel of the contribution monument

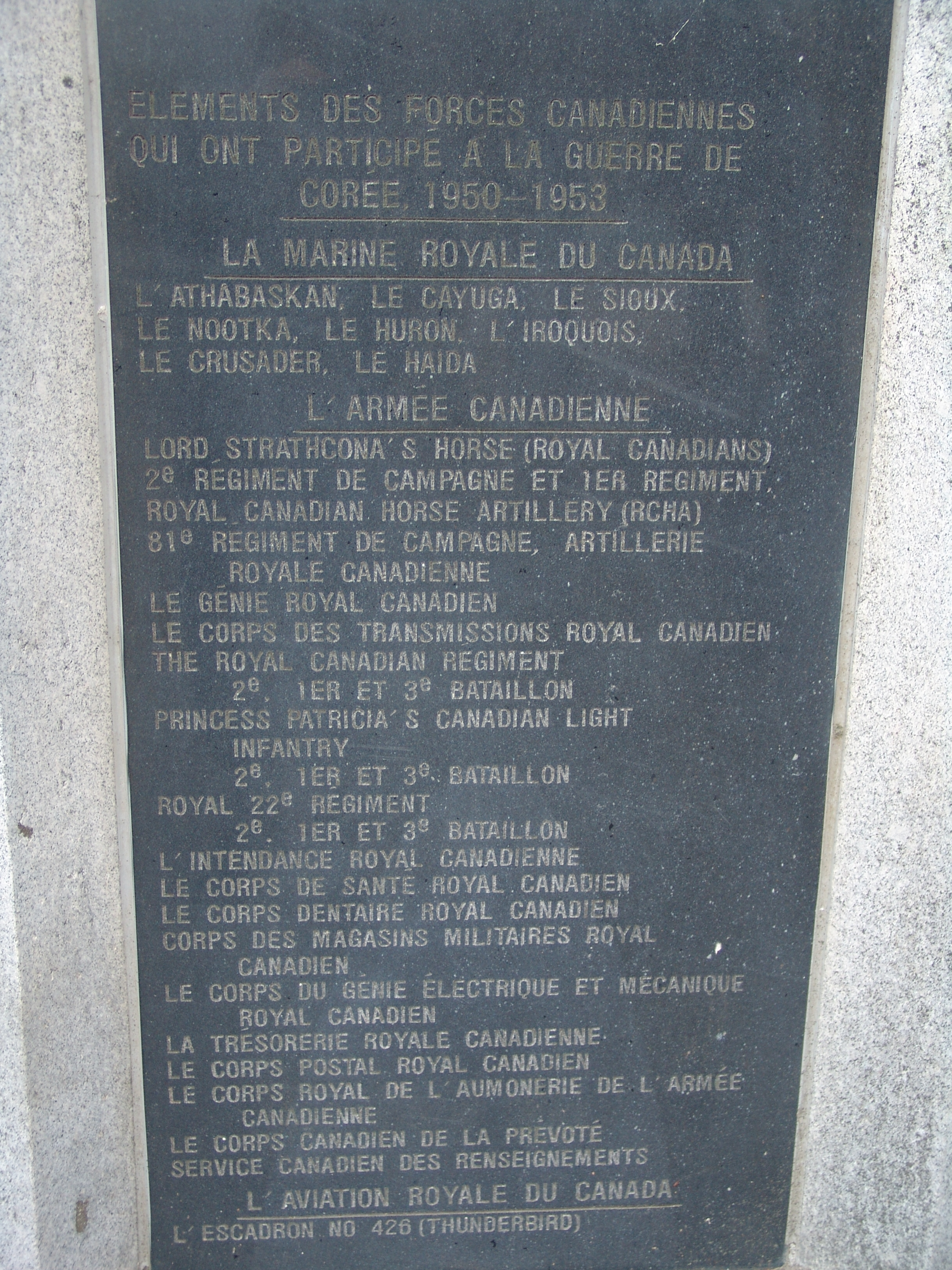
Right panel of the contribution monument

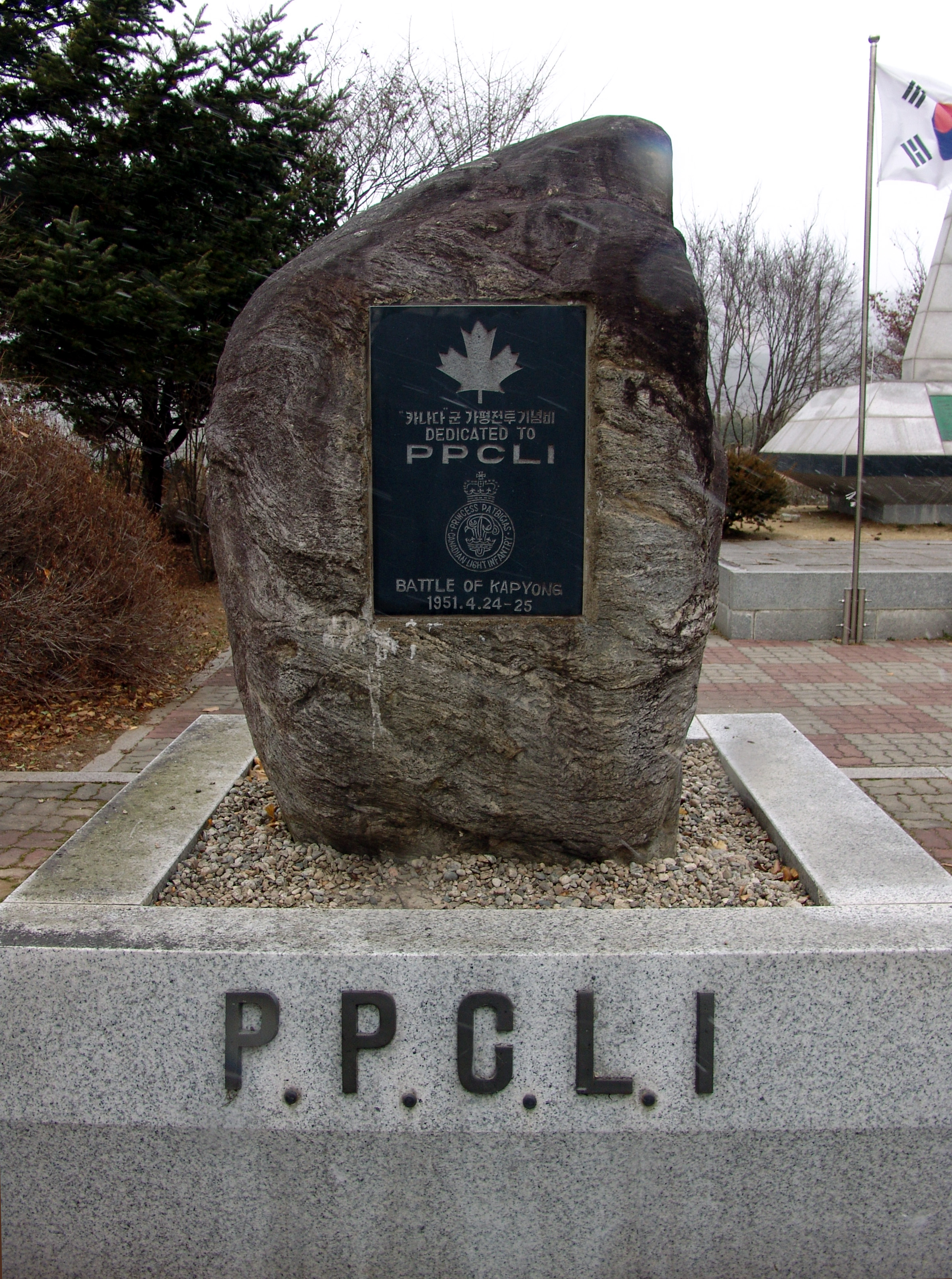
The Princess Patricia's Canadian Light Infantry Monument

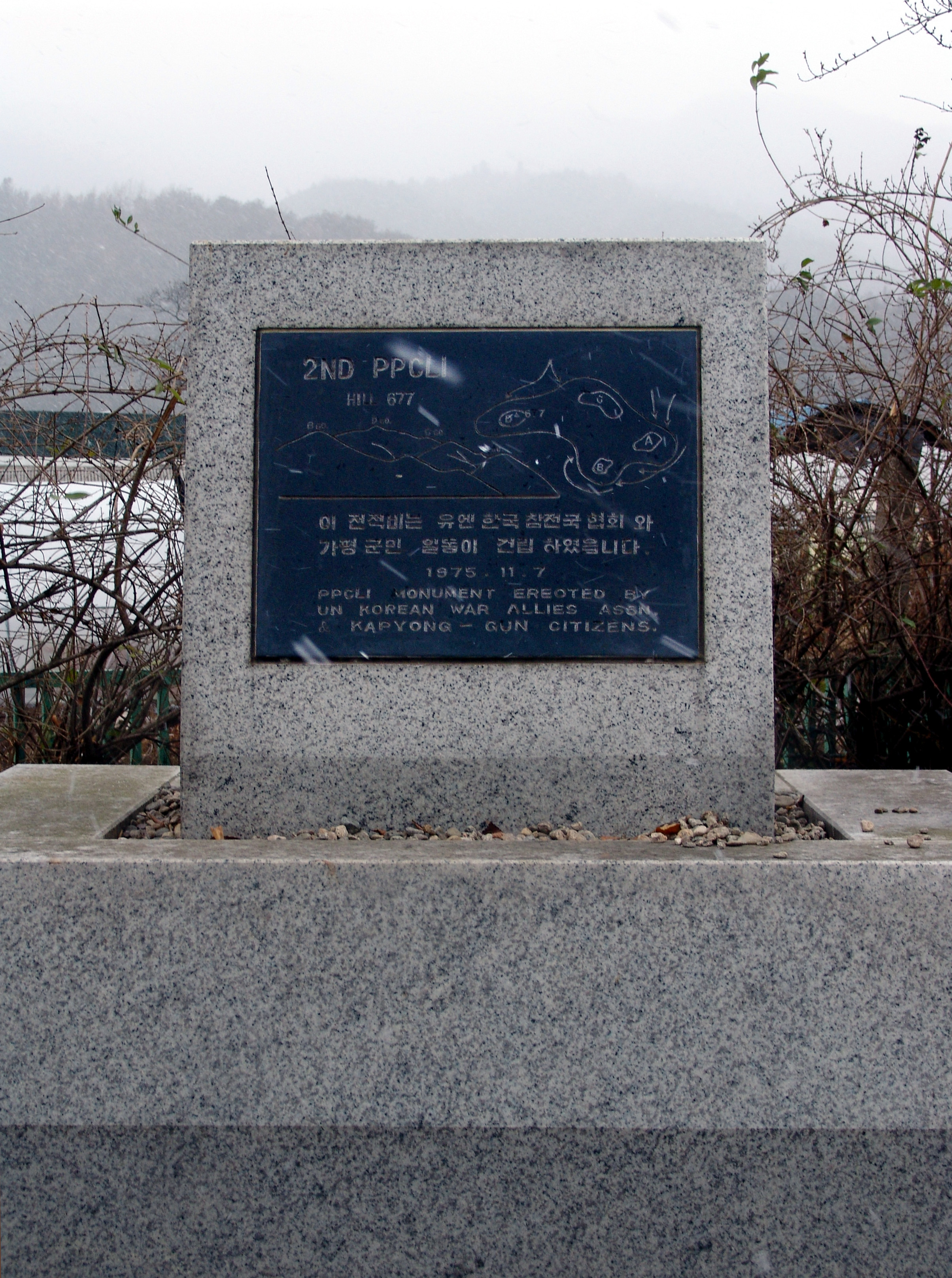
The text of the PPCLI Monument

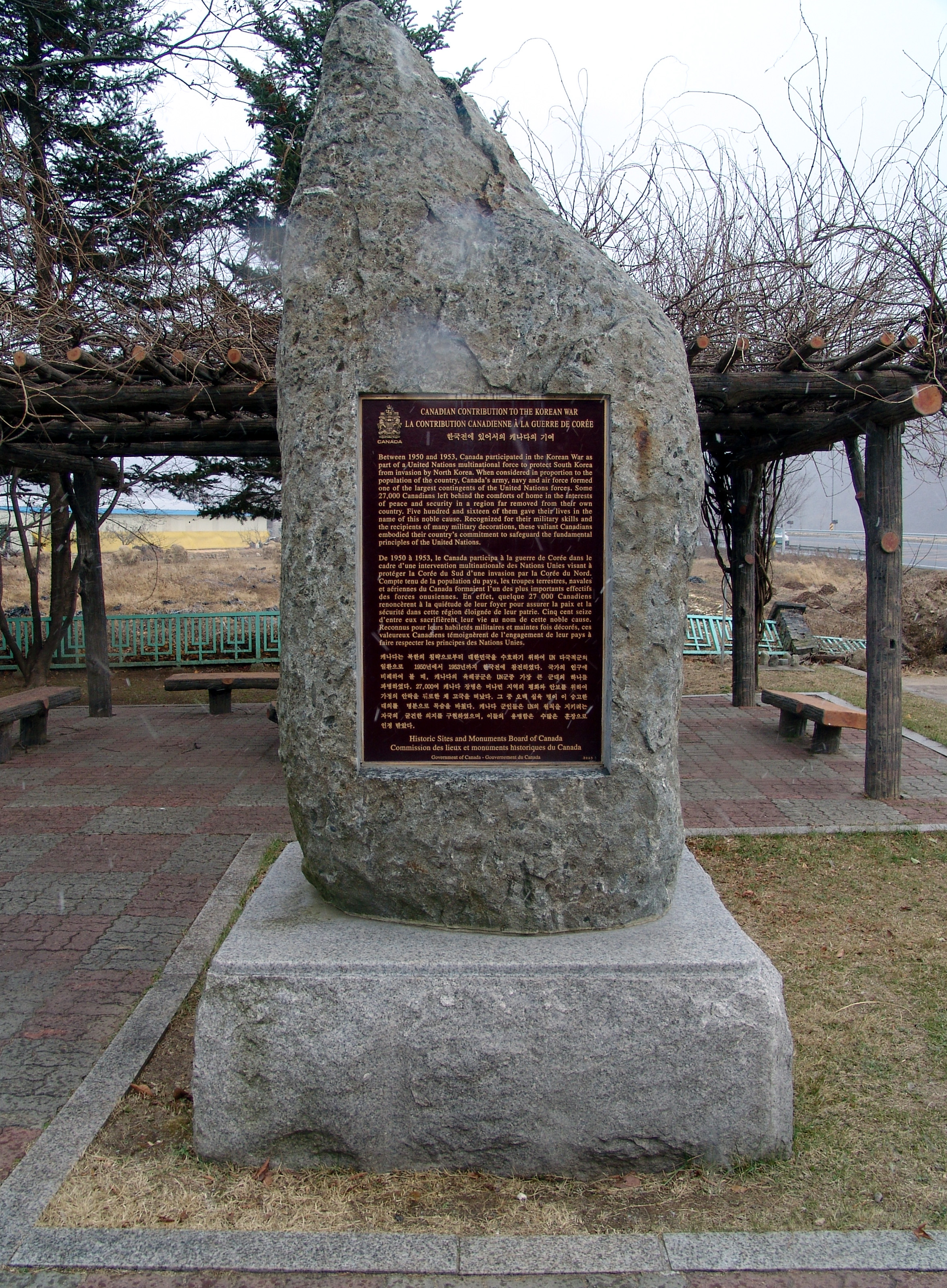
The monument to the Canadian Contribution

== See also ==
- United Nations Memorial Cemetery – Busan, South Korea, which holds the remains of 378 Canadians killed in the Korean War
