= Gord Simpson =

Canadian ice hockey player (1928–2019)

Gordon McLean Simpson (May 10, 1928 – July 11, 2019) was a Canadian ice hockey player. As a defenceman, he played with the Winnipeg Maroons for 14 years. He was born in Winnipeg, Manitoba.

The Canadian Amateur Hockey Association merged the Canada men's national ice hockey team into the Maroons in 1965, and Simpson continued as coach. Father David Bauer, who had founded the national team, continued as its manager and saw the merger as the beginning of a truly national team based in the geographic centre of the country.

== Awards and achievements ==
- Allan Cup Championship (1964)
- "Honoured Member" of the Manitoba Hockey Hall of Fame
