= David Bauer (ice hockey) =

Canadian ice hockey coach and Catholic priest (1924–1988)

The Reverend Father David Bauer CSB OC
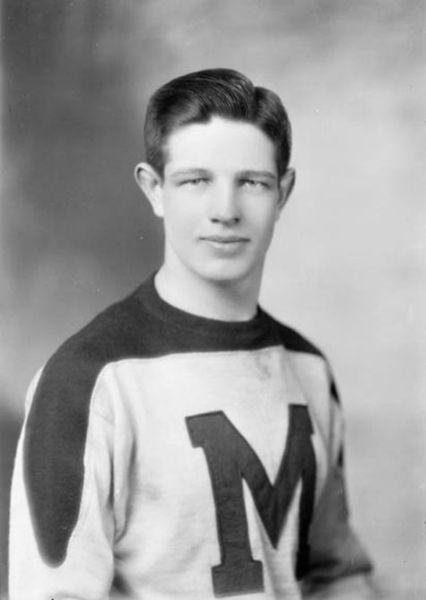
- Born: November 2, 1924; Waterloo, Ontario, Canada
- Died: November 9, 1988 (aged 64); Goderich, Ontario, Canada
- Education: University of St. Michael's College
- Occupations: Catholic priest and educator
- Known for: Canada men's national ice hockey team; Toronto St. Michael's Majors
- Family: Bobby Bauer (brother)
- Awards: Order of Canada; Canada's Sports Hall of Fame; Hockey Hall of Fame; IIHF Hall of Fame; Ontario Sports Hall of Fame
- Honours: Father David Bauer Olympic Arena; Father Bauer Arena

David William Bauer CSB OC (November 2, 1924 – November 9, 1988) was a Canadian ice hockey player and coach, educator and Catholic priest. He was a member of the Basilians, and established a program to develop players for the Canada men's national ice hockey team.

He was offered a playing contract by the Boston Bruins at age 15, but declined on the advice of his father to complete a proper education. The experience of not pursuing his dream of playing professional hockey was traumatic for Bauer, who then committed himself to look for more meaning in life and play a role in world peace. After he served as captain of the Toronto St. Michael's Majors for two seasons and won the 1944 Memorial Cup, he became ordained as a Catholic priest in the Congregation of St. Basil and taught at St. Michael's College School. He coached multiple levels of hockey at St. Michael's, sat on the junior ice hockey council for the Ontario Hockey Association, lobbied for a shortened playing schedule for students athletes, and coached the St. Michael's Majors to victory in the 1961 Memorial Cup. Bauer was reassigned to St. Mark's College at the University of British Columbia (UBC) in 1961, then coached the UBC Thunderbirds for two seasons and led them to the finals at the 1963 CIAU University Cup.

The Canadian Amateur Hockey Association approved a proposal by Bauer to have a team of Canadian university students combined with senior ice hockey players to represent Canada in ice hockey at the Olympics and at the Ice Hockey World Championships; which was a radical change from the existing practice of the reigning Allan Cup champion team being selected. He established the Canada men's national ice hockey team program in September 1963, seeking players with athletic and academic morals committed to their studies and training. He prepared the players for the larger international ice hockey rink surface and differences from the North American ice hockey rules, and intended to change Canada's reputation of being heavily penalized for rough play. Canada finished in fourth place based on goal differential at the 1964 Winter Olympics, amidst accusations that International Ice Hockey Federation president Bunny Ahearne made a last-minute change to the tie-breaking rules to take away a medal from Canada. Bauer transitioned into managing the national team when the program relocated to Winnipeg in 1965, and assembled teams that won the bronze medal at the 1966 and 1967 World Championships, and the 1968 Winter Olympics. He later managed the national team which finished in sixth place at the 1980 Winter Olympics.

When Canada withdrew from international play during the 1970s, Bauer instructed at hockey schools in Japan for two six-week periods each year, where his teachings on personal growth and discipline fit into the culture of Japan. He also coached the Austria men's national ice hockey team during the 1973 Ice Hockey World Championships. Throughout his career, he felt that hockey was a means to teach the game of life and way for boys to become men. He advocated for players receiving an education and was opposed to the growing professionalism in the amateur game. Bauer received many honours, which included induction into Canada's Sports Hall of Fame, the Hockey Hall of Fame, the IIHF Hall of Fame and the Ontario Sports Hall of Fame. He was made an officer of the Order of Canada, and is the namesake of the Father Bauer Arena and the Father David Bauer Olympic Arena, both of which are used by Canada for international hockey.

== Early life and family ==
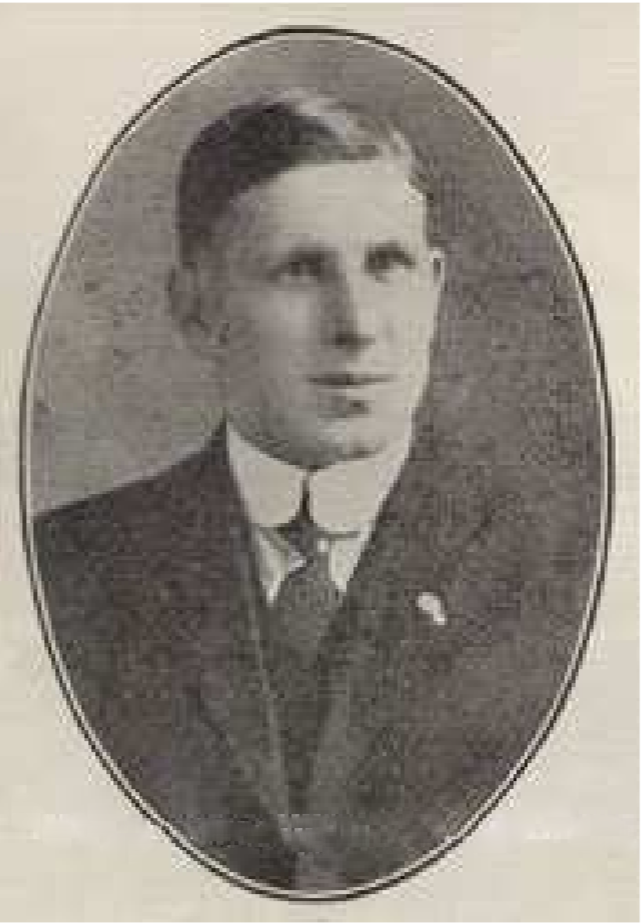
Edgar J. Bauer, c. 1900

David William Bauer was born on November 2, 1924, in Waterloo, Ontario. His great-grandparents had emigrated from Bavaria to Waterloo via Buffalo, New York. His father Sir Edgar J. Bauer was an automotive supplies manufacturer and a Knight Commander of the Order of St. Sylvester. Edgar Bauer also served as president of Globe Furniture and the Waterloo Fire Insurance Company, and sat on the Waterloo City Council and the public utilities commission. His mother Alice Bertha Hayes was active in the Catholic Women's League of Canada and a member of the Our Lady of Mount Carmel Guild.

Bauer was the youngest of 11 children and had five brothers and five sisters. He attended St. Louis Separate School as a youth followed by three years at St. Jerome's College School. As a youth, Bauer played pond hockey in Victoria Park with friends who included Howie Meeker and George Hainsworth Jr. The Bauers later had an ice rink constructed at their house, including side boards, painted lines and floodlights.

All of Bauer's brothers played ice hockey and won a league championship. Bobby Bauer won two Stanley Cups playing for the Boston Bruins. Bobby and Frank won the 1934 Memorial Cup playing for the Toronto St. Michael's Majors. Eugene won a league championship with the Kitchener Greenshirts in 1935. Jerry and Ray won a league championship with the Waterloo Siskins in 1940.

== Student life and playing career ==
Bauer aspired to play in the National Hockey League (NHL) and attended training camp for the Boston Bruins held in Hershey, Pennsylvania in October 1941. The highest level of hockey he had played at the time was as a centreman for his school team. He was offered a contract to play for the Boston Olympics, a farm team for the Bruins. His father insisted his son was too young for professional hockey, and that he should first complete a proper education. Bauer later stated that it was a traumatic experience for him not to pursue his dream of playing professional hockey, which had resulted in him looking for something more in life.

"In a sense the founding of the national team dates back to when I was 15 years of age. It was then that my father told me that I would be a professional hockey player before I got an education — over his dead body. During those years he also impressed upon me the fact that one day I would have to account to God for the talents He had given me, and that there was a priority in terms of the development of our talents that included not just my own self-fulfillment but also the playing of a role in the development of world peace".

— Father David Bauer, 1971

Bauer returned to Waterloo for another year at St. Jerome's, then followed in the footsteps of his brothers Frank and Bobby when he enrolled at St. Michael's College School to play hockey. Bauer served as team captain of the Toronto St. Michael's Majors for two seasons from 1942 to 1944. He excelled as a student, played as a left winger, and was considered a gentlemanly player and a role model by his teammates. During the summer between grades 11 and 12, Bauer returned home and was a pitcher in a senior baseball league in Waterloo.

"Dave Bauer was a class act all the way. He could've been a good one. He had more determination than Bobby [Bauer]. I played against Bobby, he was finesse. Dave was more grinding, He had all kinds of talent, and when it came to determination, no one was better. He would've made it to the NHL easily if he had wanted to".

— John McCormack, 2009

Memorial Cup trophy

Bauer and the Majors were finalists for the J. Ross Robertson Cup in 1943–44 season, but lost to the Oshawa Generals. Wartime replacement rules allowed the Generals to add up to four players from the Majors in the remainder of the playoffs. Bauer played for the Generals team which won the Eastern Canada championship and then won the 1944 Memorial Cup to become Canadian junior champions. Bauer scored four goals and five assists during the championship series for the Generals.

Bauer received two varsity letters for athletics at St. Michael's College School. He also played golf, tennis, baseball and was the quarterback on the for St. Michael's football team. The school had an undefeated football season in his senior year.

Bauer played one final game for the Majors in the 1944–45 season, shortly before he enlisted in the Canadian Army on November 24, 1944, and assigned to Basic Training Unit 12 in Chatham, Ontario. All of his brothers completed military service during World War II; Bobby and Ray were in the Royal Canadian Air Force, Jerry was in the Royal Canadian Navy, and Frank, Eugene and Dave were in the Canadian Army. While serving with the army, Bauer played hockey for the Royal Canadian Postal Corps in the Ottawa National Defence Hockey League and then briefly with the Windsor Spitfires in the Windsor City Hockey League. He enrolled at the University of Toronto upon release from the Army. His playing career ended with the University of Toronto Varsity Blues during the 1945–46 season after he began studies for priesthood.

=== Playing statistics ===
Regular season and playoffs statistics.

			Regular Season					Playoffs
Season	Team	League	GP	G	A	Pts	PIM	GP	G	A	Pts	PIM
1942–43	Toronto St. Michael's Majors	OHA Jr.	20	10	11	21	10	6	2	8	10	2
1943–44	Toronto St. Michael's Majors	OHA Jr.	25	12	25	37	20	12	7	5	12	12
1944	Oshawa Generals	Memorial Cup	–	–	–	–	–	7	4	5	9	4
1944–45	Toronto St. Michael's Majors	OHA Jr.	1	1	1	2	0	–	–	–	–	–
1944–45	Windsor Spitfires	WCHL	6	2	5	7	2	–	–	–	–	–
1944–45	Royal Canadian Postal Corps (Ottawa)	ONDHL	10	2	5	7	4	–	–	–	–	–
1945–46	University of Toronto Varsity Blues	CIAU	5	1	5	6	2	1	0	1	1	0
Totals			67	28	52	80	38	26	13	19	32	18

== Entering the priesthood ==
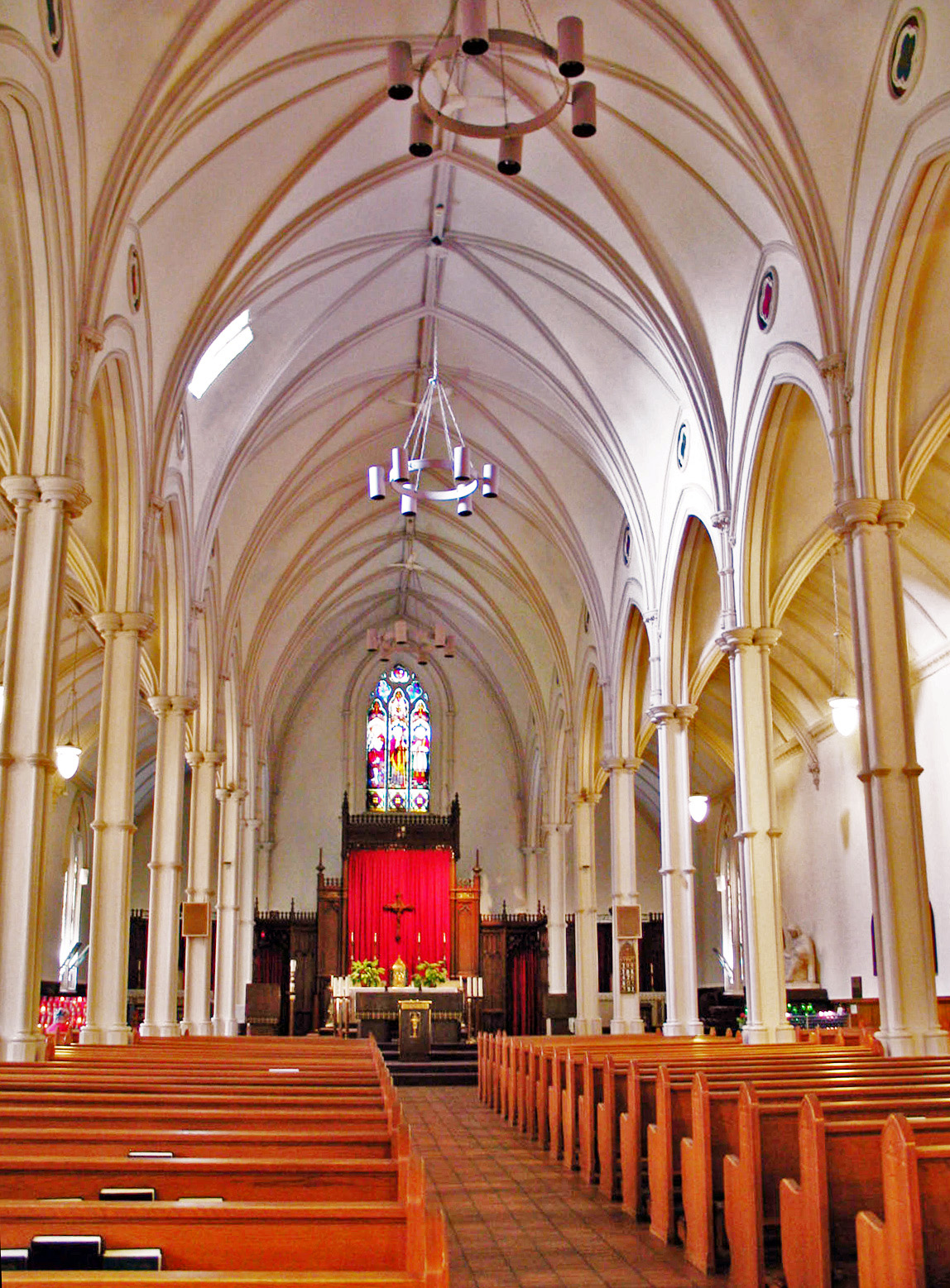
St. Basil's Church, Toronto

Bauer went to Richmond Hill in 1946, and entered the novitiate for the Congregation of St. Basil to study for the priesthood, then took his religious vows on September 12, 1947. He returned to the University of St. Michael's College at the University of Toronto to complete undergraduate studies and earned a Bachelor of Arts in philosophy in 1949. His influences as a student included philosopher Jacques Maritain and writer Christopher Dawson. Bauer earned his teaching certificate from the Ontario College of Education in 1951.

In 1952, the Bauer family was a major contributor towards funding and establishing the Carmel of St. Joseph Monastery in St. Agatha near Waterloo. Bauer was ordained as a Catholic priest on June 29, 1953, at St. Basil's Church in Toronto by Cardinal James McGuigan. Bauer conducted his first mass as a priest at St. Jerome's Roman Catholic Church in Waterloo in 1953.

== St. Michael's teacher and coach ==
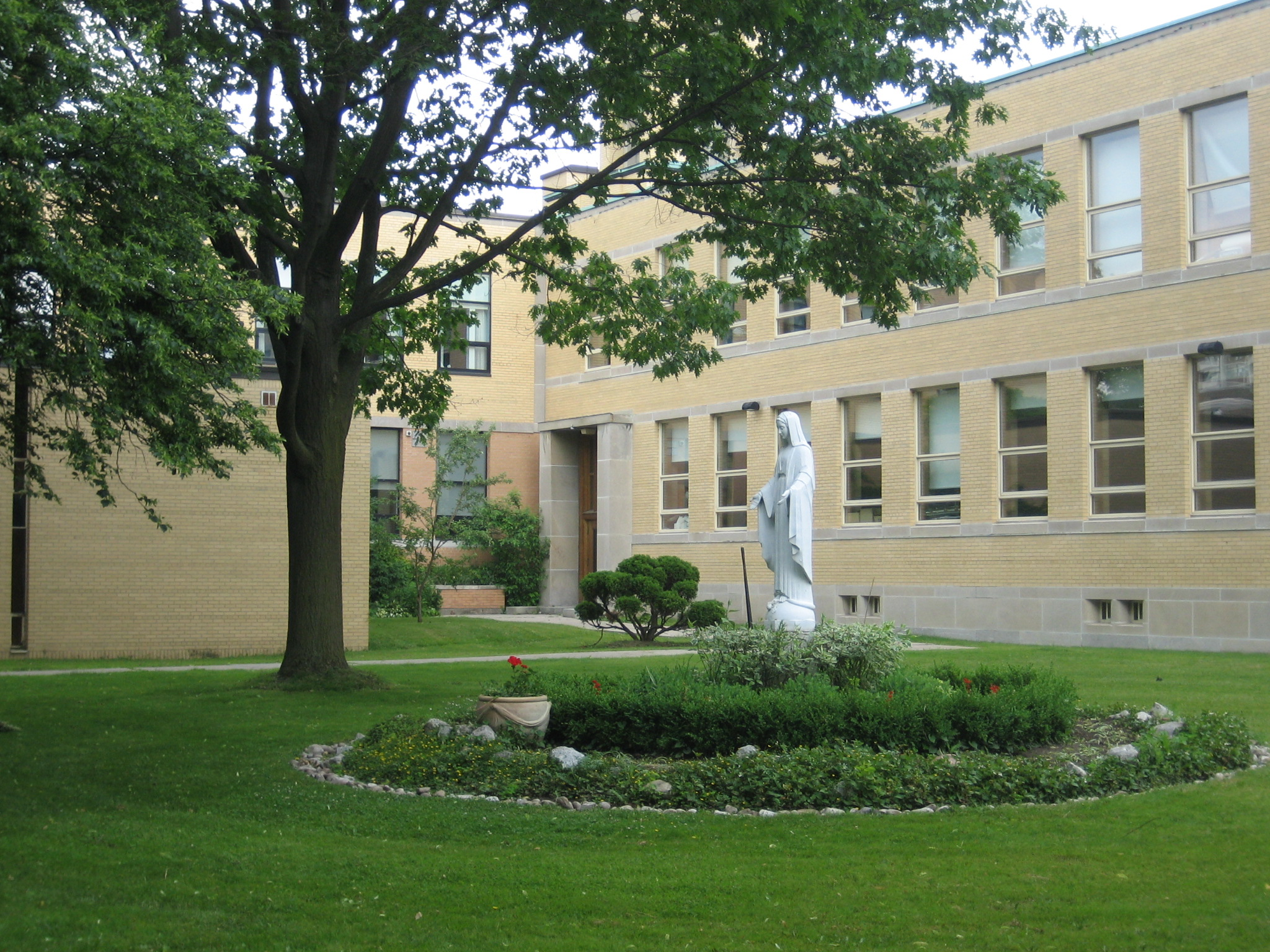
St. Michael's College School

Bauer taught at St. Michael's College School from 1953 to 1961, and sought for the education system to produce more wise leaders. The school was operated by the Basilian fathers. Their motto, "Teach me goodness, discipline and knowledge" was derived from Psalm 119. Bauer taught ethics, religion, theology and history, while coaching the hockey and football programs. In January 1957, he was named assistant principal of St. Michael's.

Bauer sat on the junior ice hockey council for the Ontario Hockey Association (OHA), and coached and managed teams at all levels of hockey offered by St. Michael's. He protected his players against the advances of professional teams that tried to sign junior-aged players to contracts, and felt that the players needed more time to develop. He and the Basilian fathers lobbied for a shortened schedule for the Toronto St. Michael's Majors in the OHA's top tier of junior hockey after the 1958–59 season, since they believed it was too long and detrimental to academic studies for their students.

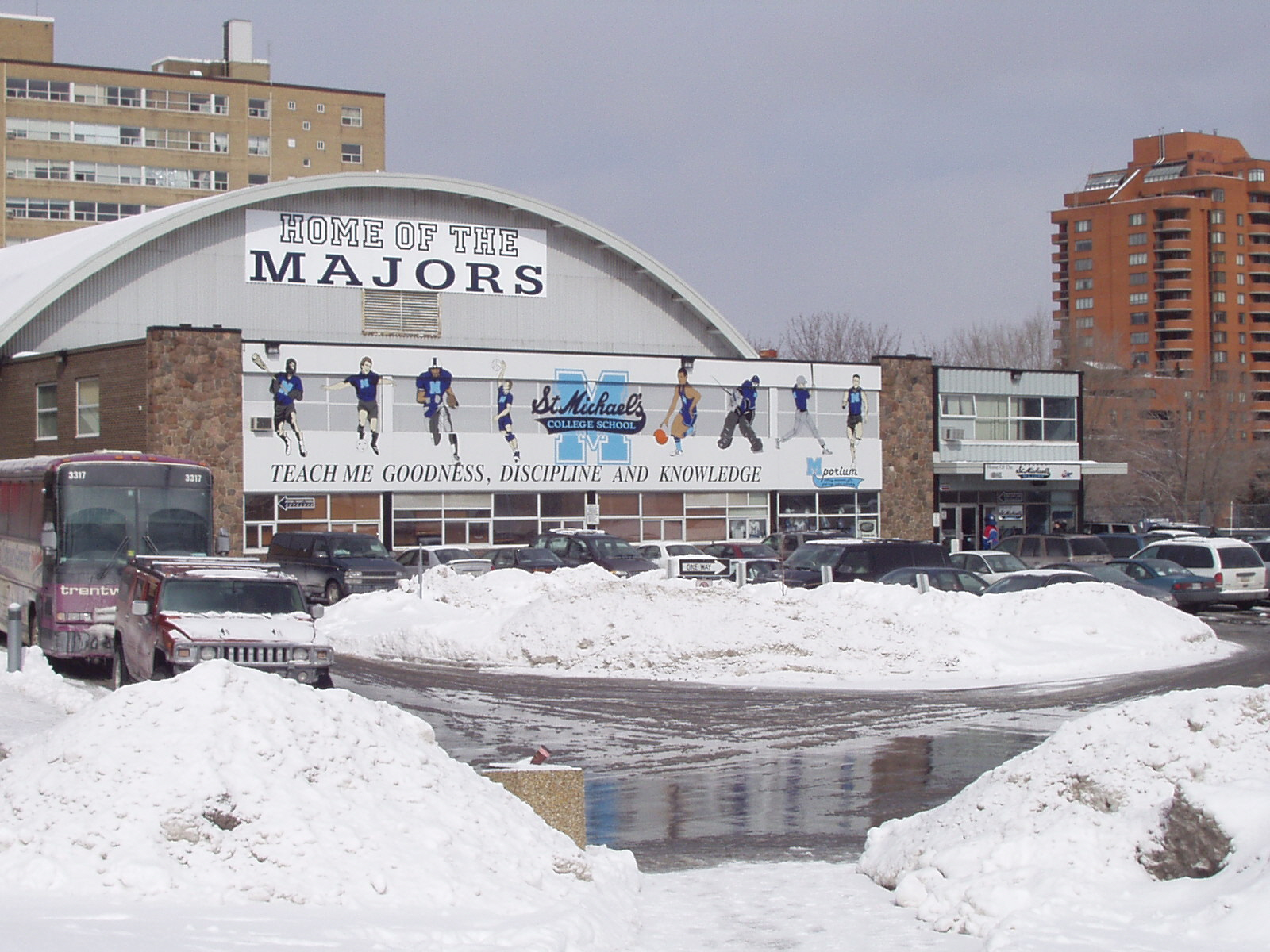
St. Michael's College School arena

Bob Goldham resigned as head coach of the Majors in 1960, and Bauer took over as head coach for the 1960–61 OHA season in addition to his role as general manager. He stressed fundamentals of defensive play without the puck and taught players how to absorb contact without getting hurt. He occasionally had his players switch positions with one another to learn an appreciation of their teammate's contributions. The Majors finished in second place during the season, then defeated the Guelph Royals in the playoffs for the OHA championship. The Majors won the Eastern Canada final defeating the Moncton Beavers then travelled to Edmonton to play in the 1961 Memorial Cup. The Majors defeated the Edmonton Oil Kings in six games and won the school's fourth Memorial Cup.

The Basilian fathers again discussed the length of the season and the amount of travel having an effect on academics. They were also concerned with increasing physical play and growing similarities with professional leagues. The Majors had played 98 games including the regular season and playoffs for the Memorial Cup. St. Michael's could no longer justify participation in the top tier of the OHA and chose to withdraw from the Ontario Hockey Association Junior A series. Bauer stated in a 1987 interview that, "We regretted very much leaving because we knew that this [school] is a major recreational institution in this country".

After the official announcement on June 6, 1961, Bauer placed his protégé Jim Gregory in charge of the team. The Majors operated for one more season and played a shortened 33-game schedule in the Metro Junior A League for the 1961–62 OHA season. The team was transferred to Neil McNeil High School and became known as the Toronto Neil McNeil Maroons in 1962.

== St. Mark's and the Thunderbirds ==
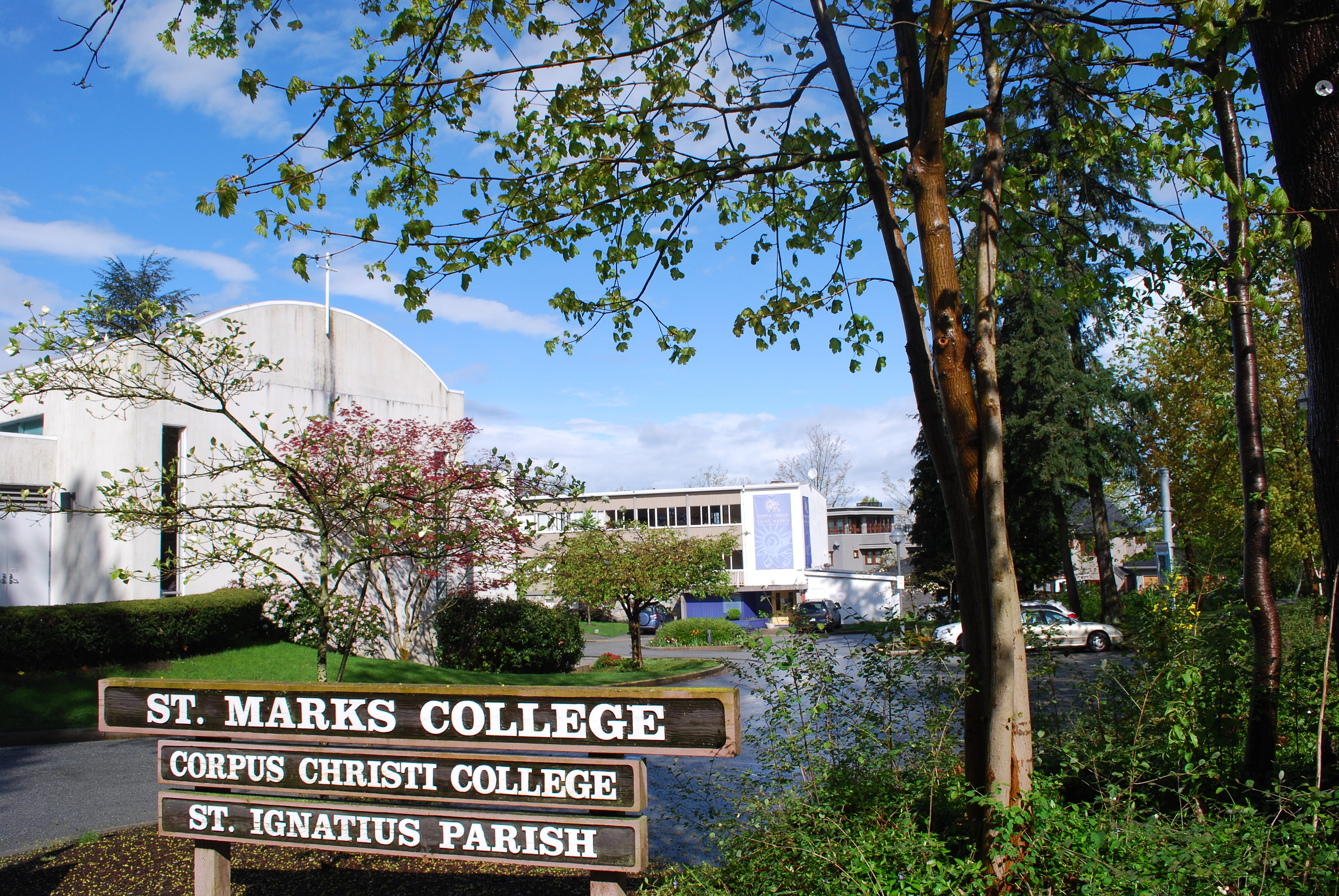
St. Mark's College

The Basilian fathers reassigned Bauer to St. Mark's College at the University of British Columbia (UBC) in 1961. He taught ethics to nurses at the college, and served as the dean of residence and the chaplain at St. Paul's Hospital.

Prior to Bauer's arrival at St. Mark's, he received a letter from the university's athletics department asking him to coach the UBC Thunderbirds which played in the Western Canadian Intercollegiate Athletic Association. He agreed to assist the coach for the 1961–62 season, but was initially reluctant to do more. Players on the Thunderbirds wanted to get rid of coach Al Stuart and Bauer agreed to take over in January 1962, after persistent requests by the players and meetings with the UBC athletic director.

After it was announced the Bauer was coaching, more players wanted to join the team in addition to Bauer beginning a recruitment program across Canada. UBC physical education teacher Bob Hindmarch became general manager of the Thunderbirds and made the financial and academic arrangements for the players to get to Vancouver. The university had no rink of its own at the time, and used Kerrisdale Arena or the North Shore Winter Club's curling rink for practice, with games played at the Vancouver Forum. Bauer taught a defence-first mentality to his team which was not the most skilled, and cancelled practices as needed to allow his players to catch up academically. The Thunderbirds won two exhibition games, but were winless in league games during the season.

In the 1962–63 season, 120 players came to training camp for the Thunderbirds. Bauer selected the best skaters for the team, and arranged for exhibition games versus senior ice hockey teams in British Columbia. The Thunderbirds combined with players from the Toronto Marlboros to play an exhibition game versus the Soviet Union national ice hockey team, but lost by a 6–0 score. The Thunderbirds had an annual rivalry with the Alberta Golden Bears for the Hamber Cup, which they had never won since the trophy was established in 1950. The Thunderbirds won their first Hamber cup in a two-game series including a 3–2 overtime loss and a 3–1 victory. Bauer led the Thunderbirds to eight wins, one loss and one tie in the regular season to win the Western Canadian Intercollegiate Athletic Association title, and qualify for the national championship. The Thunderbirds reached the final game of the Canadian Interuniversity Athletic Union men's ice hockey championship tournament in Kingston, Ontario. They lost the championship game for the CIAU University Cup by a 3–2 score to the McMaster Marauders, who scored the winning goal scored on a power play resulting from a too-many-men-on-the-ice penalty.

During the season, Bauer worked with Vancouver alderman Frank Fredrickson, to secure C$500,000 in funding necessary to build a new arena. The Thunderbird Sports Centre opened in September 1963.

== International ice hockey ==
=== National team proposal ===
The Allan Cup was the championship trophy for amateur senior ice hockey in Canada.

Bauer and his brother Ray attended the 1962 Ice Hockey World Championships in Colorado Springs, Colorado, which was the first time North America hosted the World Championships. The Bauer family had a history of international competition. Ray Bauer represented Canada at the 1949 Ice Hockey World Championships as a member of the Sudbury Wolves, and Bobby Bauer coached the Kitchener-Waterloo Dutchmen at the 1956 Winter Olympics and the 1960 Winter Olympics.

The Canadian Amateur Hockey Association (CAHA) annually chose an amateur senior team to represent the country at international competitions, which was usually the reigning Allan Cup champion team since it met the amateur eligibility requirements for the ice hockey at the Olympic Games and the Ice Hockey World Championships. When the Kitchener-Waterloo Dutchmen represented Canada, Ray Bauer funded expenses for the team through the family business, since the Government of Canada declined to provide funding and the CAHA did not cover all of the travel expenses. The Bauers felt it was unfair for one city to pay most of the expenses to send a team to represent the whole country. Bauer spoke with American coaches during the World Championships, and learned of their detailed preparation plans for the 1964 Winter Olympics, whereas Canada did not yet know which team would represent the country.

Bauer suggested it might be time for Canadian universities and colleges to represent the country since they met amateur eligibility requirements, and he felt there were young men who would be interested in a program which combined education and hockey. He felt that a core group of students could be reinforced with the best available Canadian senior players for international competition. He discussed the concept with CAHA president Jack Roxburgh and secretary Gordon Juckes who were also in attendance at the World Championships, and was invited make a presentation at the next CAHA annual meeting in May 1962. Bauer's proposal was unanimously endorsed in principle at the general meeting, then given final approval at the CAHA executive meeting in August 1962, with partial funding provided towards board and tuition. The Canadian Olympic Association gave its approval to the proposal in October 1962.

The proposal was opposed by professional leagues including the NHL who would be competing for the same players. University of Alberta physical education director Maury Van Vliet, criticized the idea in a letter to the newspapers, and felt that the CAHA was letting Bauer assemble an all-star team at "a university that does not own a rink, located in an area that has never produced a hockey player, with a team that has never beaten anyone". When the CAHA approved the plan with only 20 minutes of discussion, journalist Trent Frayne stated that "Father Bauer is the greatest lobbyist in the history of hockey". Journalist Scott Young wrote that it was the best hockey news in Canada in years and should be given a chance. Journalist Jim Coleman reported that consensus at the time was "for Canada to embark on a radical new course", even if it included establishing a team of university students to represent Canada at international hockey events.

=== National team development ===
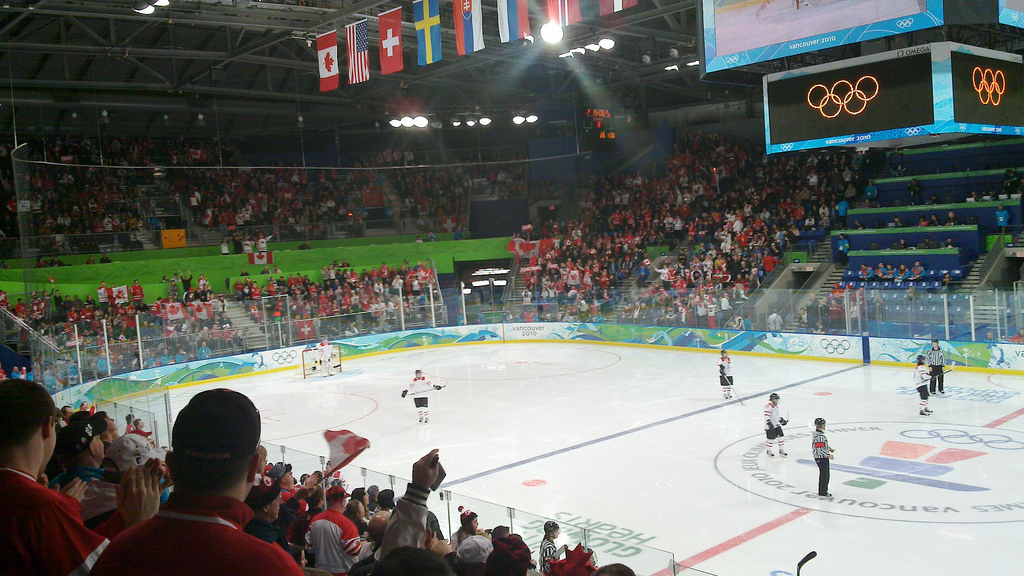
Thunderbird Sports Centre during ice hockey at the 2010 Winter Olympics

Bauer and UBC officials met with the CAHA in January 1963 and reached a financial agreement for the new team. Bauer began the national team program in September 1963. He recruited Bob Hindmarch to be the team's general manager and assistant coach, and Dennis Selder took over coaching duties of the UBC Thunderbirds.

Bauer sought players with athletic and academic morals committed to their studies and training. He prepared the players for the larger international ice hockey rink surface, and differences from the North American ice hockey rules where body checking was limited to a team's defensive zone. He intended to change Canada's reputation in Europe of being heavily penalized for rough play and frequently criticized for hooliganism on ice.

Bauer kept a regular schedule for the team which attended classes in the day time, practiced late in the afternoon, and studied later in the evening. Most of the team lived on the Point Grey campus of the University of British Columbia in a house which had previously been a transmitter station during World War II. The close-knit atmosphere promoting team bonding, as did a group effort to fix and renovate the house. Bauer recruited a German housekeeper named Ma Byers from a local restaurant in Vancouver to cook and act as a mother figure to the players.

Bauer searched for funding from Canadian businesses, and received donations from Max Bell, Charles Hay and James A. Richardson. The team was assisted by Canadian Pacific Railway president Ian Sinclair, who arranged for free or discounted transportation for the team. Bauer's mother and brothers contributed funds through the family business, and the Government of Canada's Fitness Council later contributed after Montreal journalist Andy O'Brien wrote about the players being starving scholar athletes. Bauer also arranged for the national team players to give back to the community in exchange for better funding from politicians.

Bauer's national team played its first game wearing Canadian jerseys on November 12, 1963, in an exhibition win versus the Melville Millionaires. The national team went on to play 33 exhibition games across Canada in preparation for the Olympics.

=== 1964 Winter Olympic Games ===
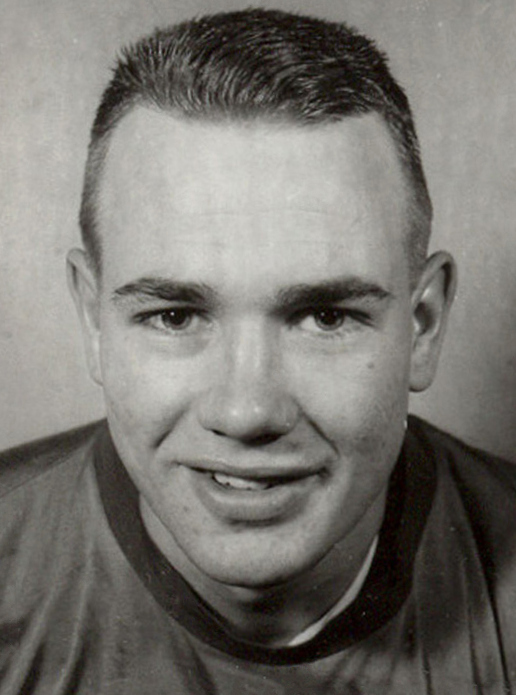
Carl-Göran Öberg

Ice hockey at the 1964 Winter Olympics was played from January 27 to February 9 at Innsbruck, Austria. Canada won its qualification game by a 14–1 score over Yugoslavia to be seeded in Group A. Bauer's team followed with an 8–0 win over Switzerland, a 4–2 win over Germany, a 6–2 win over Finland, and an 8–6 win over the United States. During the game versus Sweden, opposing player Carl-Göran Öberg broke his stick and tossed it aside. The broken end of the stick went towards the Canadian players' bench, where it struck Bauer in the face and opened a bleeding wound. Bauer demanded for his players to remain on the bench and not retaliate, since he did not want to take penalties late in the game. Canada went on to win by a 3–1 score, and Bauer forgave Öberg for the incident. On the next day, Bauer invited Öberg to sit with him while watching the Soviet Union play Czechoslovakia. Canada lost the final two games of the Olympics by a 3–1 score to Czechoslovakia, and by a 3–2 to the Soviet Union after Canada held a 2–1 advantage in the second period.

Based on his understanding of the tie-breaking procedure, Bauer's philosophy was to simply win the games against the weaker countries instead of running up the score. Canada, Czechoslovakia and Sweden finished with identical records of five wins and two losses. Canada thought they had won the bronze medal based on the goal differential in the three games among the tied countries. When they attended the presentation of the Olympic medals, they were disappointed to learn they had finished in fourth place based on goal differential of all seven games played. The players and CAHA president Art Potter accused that International Ice Hockey Federation (IIHF) president Bunny Ahearne, made a last-minute decision to change the rules and take away a medal from Canada. Bauer was one of only three Canadians who attended the medal ceremony, where he was awarded a gold medal for his example of good sportsmanship in the stick-throwing incident. Later that night, the players gathered in Bauer's room where Marshall Johnston summarized the team's feeling that, "The shepherd and his flock have been fleeced".

The national team played an exhibition tour in Europe after the Olympics then had an audience with Pope Paul VI in the Vatican City on February 15, 1964. When Bauer returned to Canada, he met with the CAHA to discuss the negative academic impact of the national team. He felt that the players had been capable students who were aware of the academic sacrifices in advance, but that representing Canada had been more important to them than their studies. Despite that seven of the players had dropped out of their courses and nine others completed less than half of their courses, Bauer felt it possible to find other methods to prevent academic impacts for the students on the national team.

At the CAHA general meeting in May 1964, Ahearne clarified that the decision to place Canada fourth in the standings was supported by the IIHF statutes and that no rules were changed. Former CAHA president and past IIHF president Robert Lebel agreed that the correct decision was made despite the accusations. At the same meeting, Bauer was given approval to continue the national team program and transitioned from coaching into a managing and advisory role.

=== National team from 1965 to 1969 ===
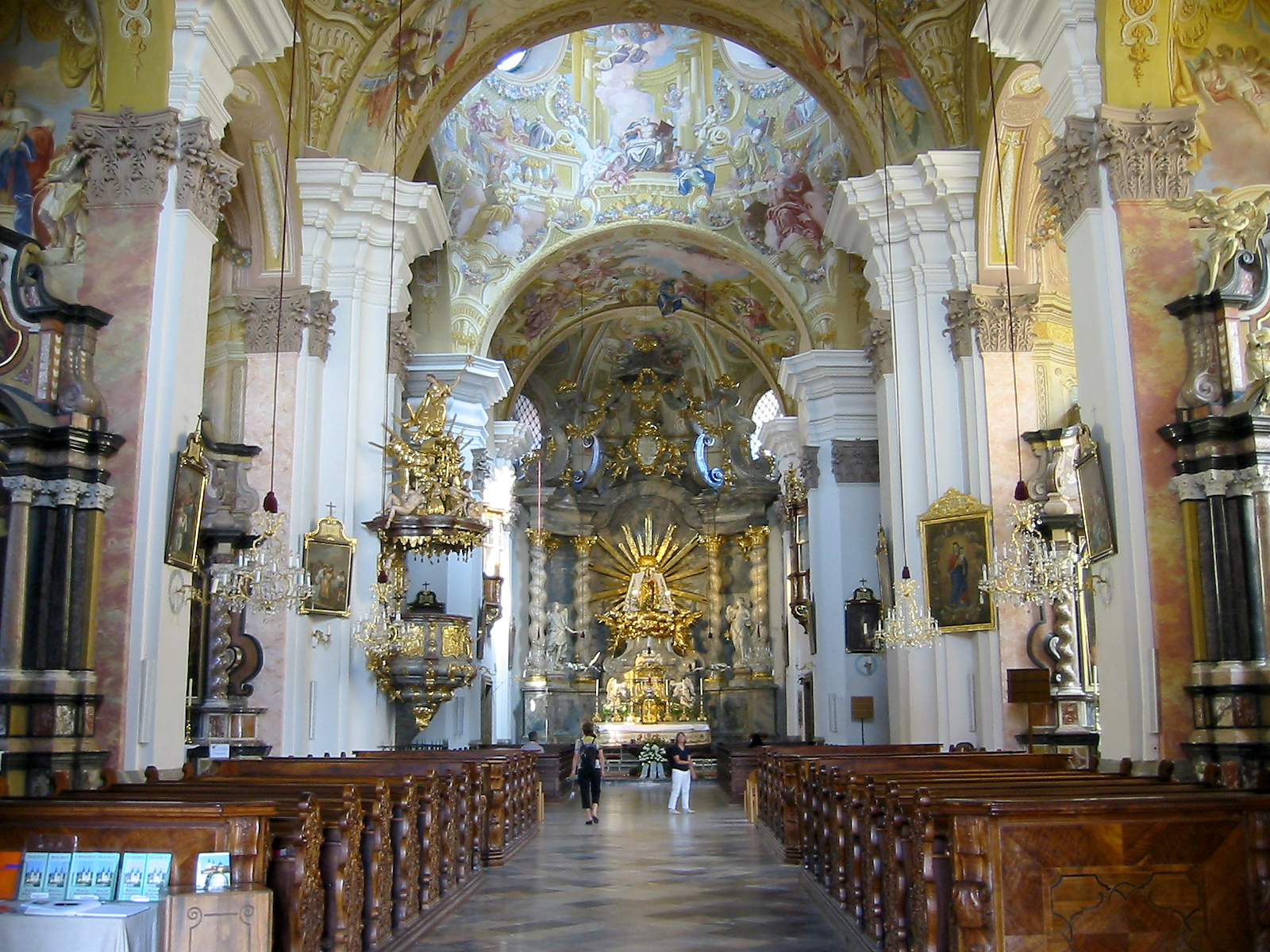
Mariatrost Basilica

Bauer travelled with the team regularly on international tours during the late 1960s. He attracted a following as a priest in Europe, and conducted mass at various locations including motels with a portable altar, a chapel within the Embassy of France in Moscow, churches in Prague and houses of his friends. While in Austria he conducted mass on several occasions at the Mariatrost Basilica, a noted pilgrimage site in Graz.

The CAHA merged the national team into the Winnipeg Maroons in 1965, and relocated the program to a new home base in Winnipeg. The Maroons were one of the best senior ice hockey teams in Canada at the time, and their coach Gord Simpson continued in the same role for the national team. Players on the team attending UBC were transferred to the University of Manitoba, and Bauer continued his recruitments efforts. He saw the merger as the beginning of a truly national team based in the geographic centre of the country.

Bauer assembled a mix of veteran and student players for the 1965 Ice Hockey World Championships. Canada finished in fourth place with four wins in seven games. He was satisfied with the result since the team had only been together for three weeks, but he felt it would be difficult for Canada to win the World Championships within the next five years. Bauer conferred with CAHA president Lionel Fleury, and discussed the merits of skipping the next World Championships to regroup and give the players more time to develop as a team.

After the CAHA made an unsuccessful bid to host the Ice Hockey World Championships as part of the Canadian Centennial celebrations in 1967, Bauer hoped that the rejection of the bid would inspire more support from the Government of Canada and the Canadian public to restore national pride in hockey. In April 1966, Bauer said, "Our biggest problem is the task of making Canadian out of all of us. We have to start someplace and we have to help our own Canadian athletes".

Bauer recruited Jackie McLeod to become the next coach of the national team since they had a similar style of being good listeners to players. At the 1966 Ice Hockey World Championships, Bauer expressed his frustrations about officiating at international events after a loss to Czechoslovakia by a 2–1 score, which saw two Canadian goals disallowed. The players wanted to withdraw from the World Championships prior to the final game versus the Soviet Union. Bauer talked the players into continuing after staying up all night, but Canada lost the final game and earned the bronze medal.

The Canadian Hockey Foundation was established in 1966 to oversee the national team. Since the foundation was not directly connected to the CAHA, it allowed the national team more flexibility in choosing players since it could bypass the professional-amateur agreement between the CAHA and the NHL. Bauer stated that the foundation had its limits, since it was not granted tax-exempt status to accept donations.

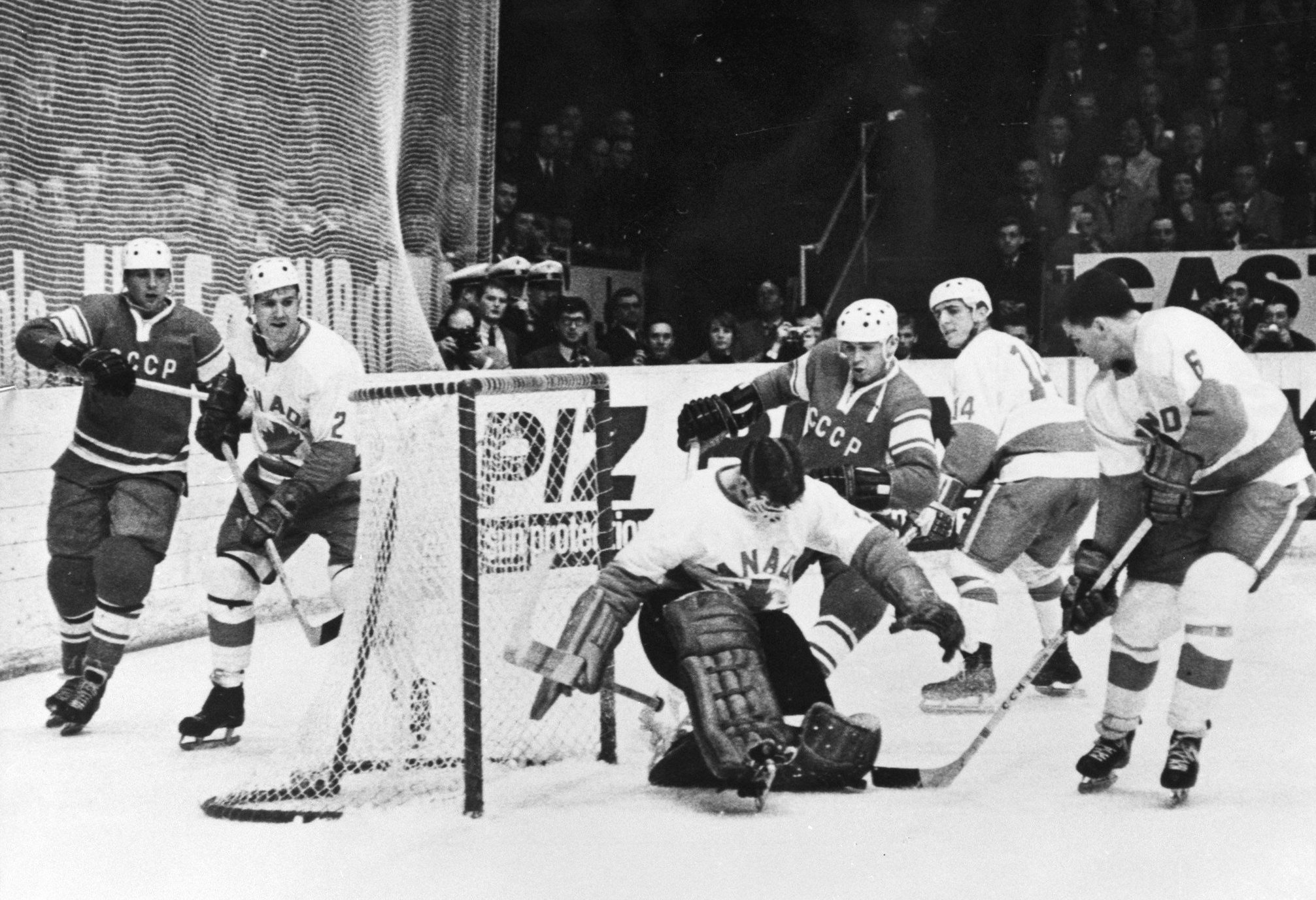
Canada versus the Soviet Union at the 1967 Ice Hockey World Championships

The CAHA hosted a Canadian Centennial tournament in 1967 and invited the national teams from the United States, Soviet Union and Czechoslovakia. The event was also an attempt to show that Winnipeg would be a suitable host location for the World Championships. The national team Bauer assembled for the event won all three games played and defeated the Soviet Union by a 5–4 score in the final game. At the 1967 Ice Hockey World Championships, Bauer's team won four of seven games played, but lost to the Soviet Union by a 2–1 score and finished with the bronze medal.

The CAHA established a second national team to increase the available pool of players at the next Olympics in 1968. Bauer recruited Jack Bownass to coach the second team which was based in Ottawa. Bauer considered both teams equal and disliked attempts by the media to label them as an "A-team" in Winnipeg and a "B-team" in Ottawa. In ice hockey at the 1968 Winter Olympics, Canada won five of seven games played and earned the bronze medal. Canada went into the final game versus the Soviet Union with a chance to win gold, but lost by a 5–0 score and Bauer described it as the best game he had seen the Soviets play.

Hockey Canada was incorporated in 1968, and the took over management of the national team from the Canadian Hockey Foundation in 1969. Bauer was appointed a member of the board of directors, which decided at its first meeting to make the eligibility of professionals at the World Championships its priority for improving the national team. Hockey Canada successfully secured funding from the Government of Canada for the national team to travel to the 1969 Ice Hockey World Championships in Sweden. Bauer's team was inexperienced internationally, and lost twice each to the Soviet Union, Czechoslovakia and Sweden, and place fourth overall.

=== National team goes on hiatus ===
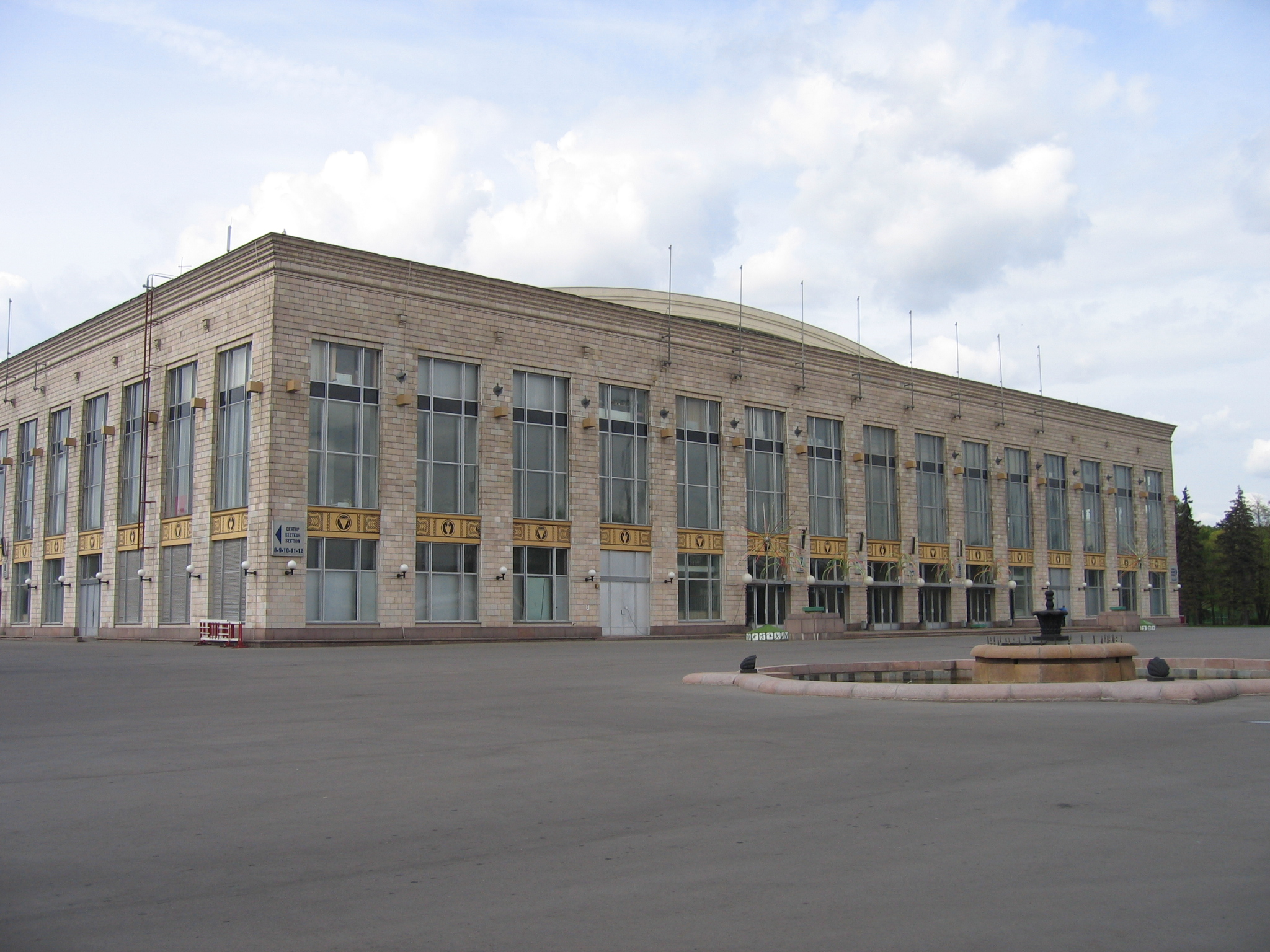
The Palace of Sports of the Central Lenin Stadium in Moscow hosted Soviet home games during the two Summit Series.

Bauer was against the use of professionals at the World Championships. His participation in the national team ended in 1969, when Canada was granted permission by the IIHF to use a limited number of professionals while hosting the 1970 Ice Hockey World Championships. On January 4, 1970, Canada withdrew from international play and hosting the World Championships due to disagreements with the IIHF and the International Olympic Committee over the use of professionals and eligibility of players for the Olympics. The national team was disbanded shortly thereafter.

Bauer remained involved with hockey while serving on the directorate of Canada's National Health & Fitness Council, and continued in an advisory role to hockey coaches and players at UBC. He offered advice to Tom Watt on selecting a Canadian team for the 1972 Winter Universiade, but chose not to coach or manage since Canada had not yet returned to international play.

Bauer wrote an article published in the Toronto Sun on September 2, 1972, giving reasons why he expected total victory in the 1972 Summit Series featuring Canada's top professional players. He felt that Canada's talent was undeniable, and that the younger Soviet team would use their conditioning and defensive play to limit scoring. He also stated of the Soviets that, "I think they've realized they've reached a certain plateau and they could improve only by playing our professionals". He was interviewed on television by Bill Good during game three on the series, and stated that the losses were indicative of domestic hockey issues in Canada, and that we could learn from the Soviets instead of underrating their abilities. Bauer hoped that the series would promote unity in Canada and better international relationships.

=== Coaching in Japan and Austria ===
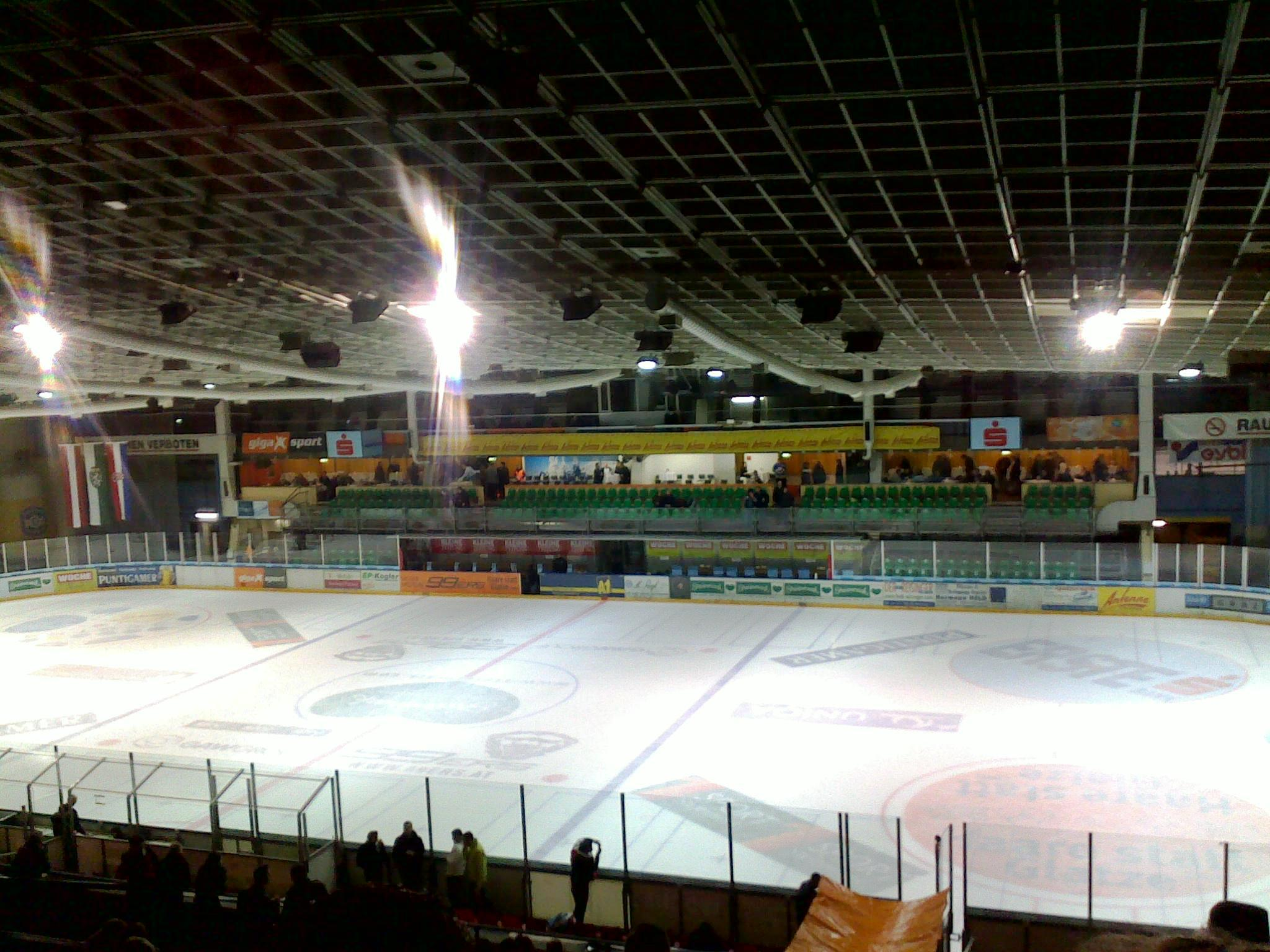
Eisstadion Liebenau was the host location of the 1973 Ice Hockey World Championships.

While attending the 1968 Winter Olympic Games, Bauer was approached by Yoshiaki Tsutsumi, chairman of the Japan Ice Hockey Federation and owner of the Seibu Tetsudo hockey club to assist with its hockey programs. Bauer first travelled to Japan in October 1968 for a month-long series of hockey clinics across the country. He continued travels to Japan and instructed at hockey schools for two six-week periods each year. His teachings on personal growth and being disciplined on the ice were welcomed within the culture of Japan.

Bauer was never paid for his services, but had his travel and expenses covered by the Seibu Group. Japanese players reciprocated Bauer's efforts by embarking on hockey tours of Canada including stops at UBC. Bauer occasionally coached the Seibu team in league play, but was unable to lead them to a league championship. He declined an offer from Tsutsumi to permanently move to Japan, but continued to work in Japan until 1978. He remained friends with the Japan Ice Hockey Federation and helped to suggest coaches and players from Canada to travel to Japan.

Bauer was invited by the Austrian Ice Hockey Association to coach the Austria men's national ice hockey team in Group B during the 1973 Ice Hockey World Championships hosted in Graz. The team finished in fifth place with two wins and five losses and avoided relegation to Group C.

=== 1980 Winter Olympic Games ===
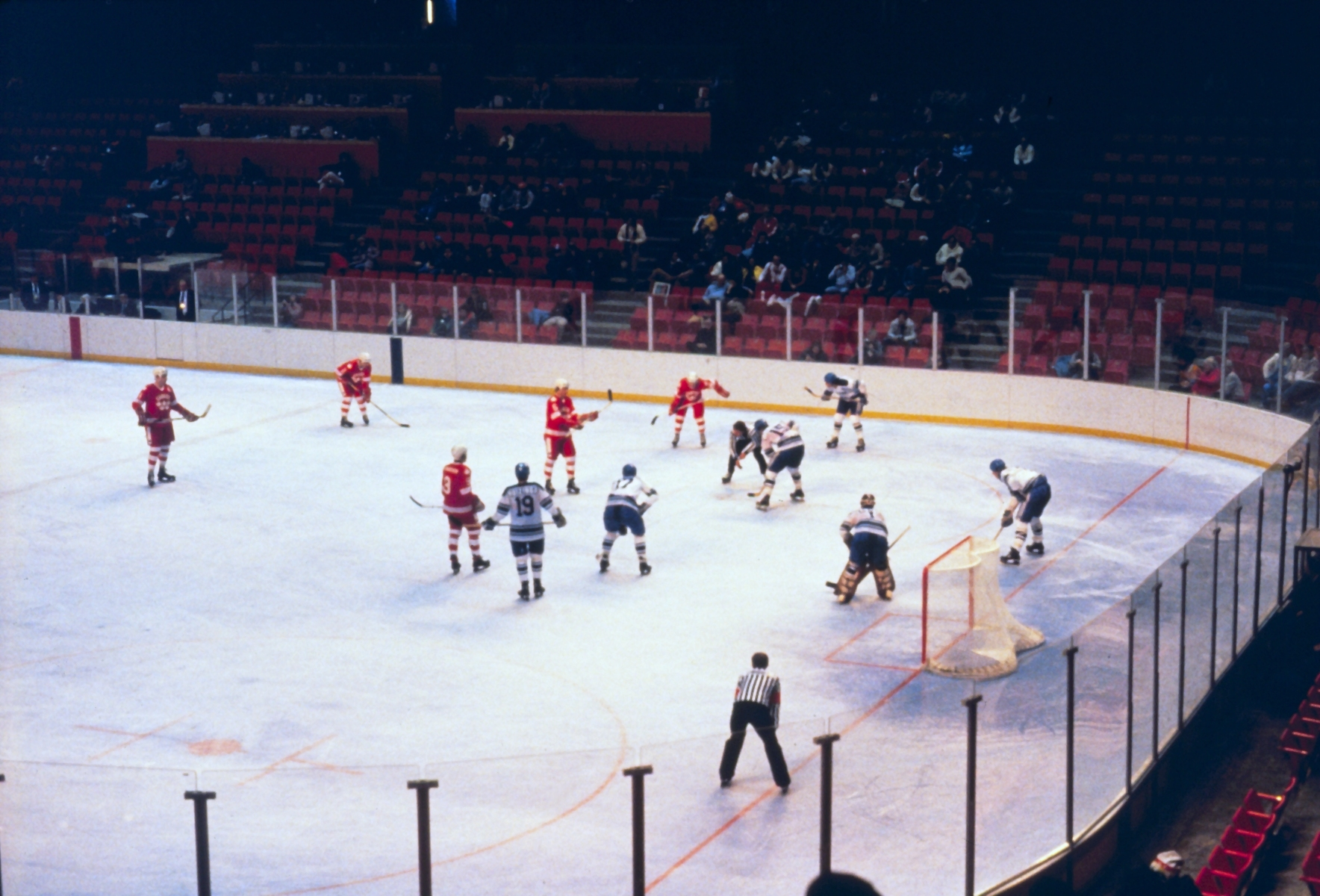
Canada versus the Netherlands at the 1980 Winter Olympic Games

The CAHA agreed to return to international play as of the 1977 Ice Hockey World Championships when professionals were allowed to participate. In October 1977, at a House of Commons and Senate committee studying Canada's role in international hockey, Bauer urged for a plan to be put into place for ice hockey at the 1980 Winter Olympics to avoid setting up the country and players for embarrassment. Hockey Canada named Bauer to be the managing director of the Olympic team that was still restricted to amateurs.

Bauer arranged a training camp six months in length to build teamwork and systems with 150 junior and college players attending. He felt that a lot of work was needed to improve the talent level to win at the Olympics, and struggled to retain talent in competition with professional teams signing amateur players to contracts. Clare Drake, Tom Watt and Lorne Davis were named to coach the national team. Bauer chose to let the coaches do the coaching, but assigned them reading material on subjects he wanted instilled into the players.

After the Olympics, Bauer gave an interview with The Globe and Mail and made no excuses for the sixth-place finish, but felt that the establishment of a permanent national team had been completed.

"The experiment has been fulfilled from the overall point of view. The whole rationale was to provide another option wherein some form of education could be involved, wherein some experiences other than hockey might be part of human growth".

— Father David Bauer, 1980

== Later life and death ==
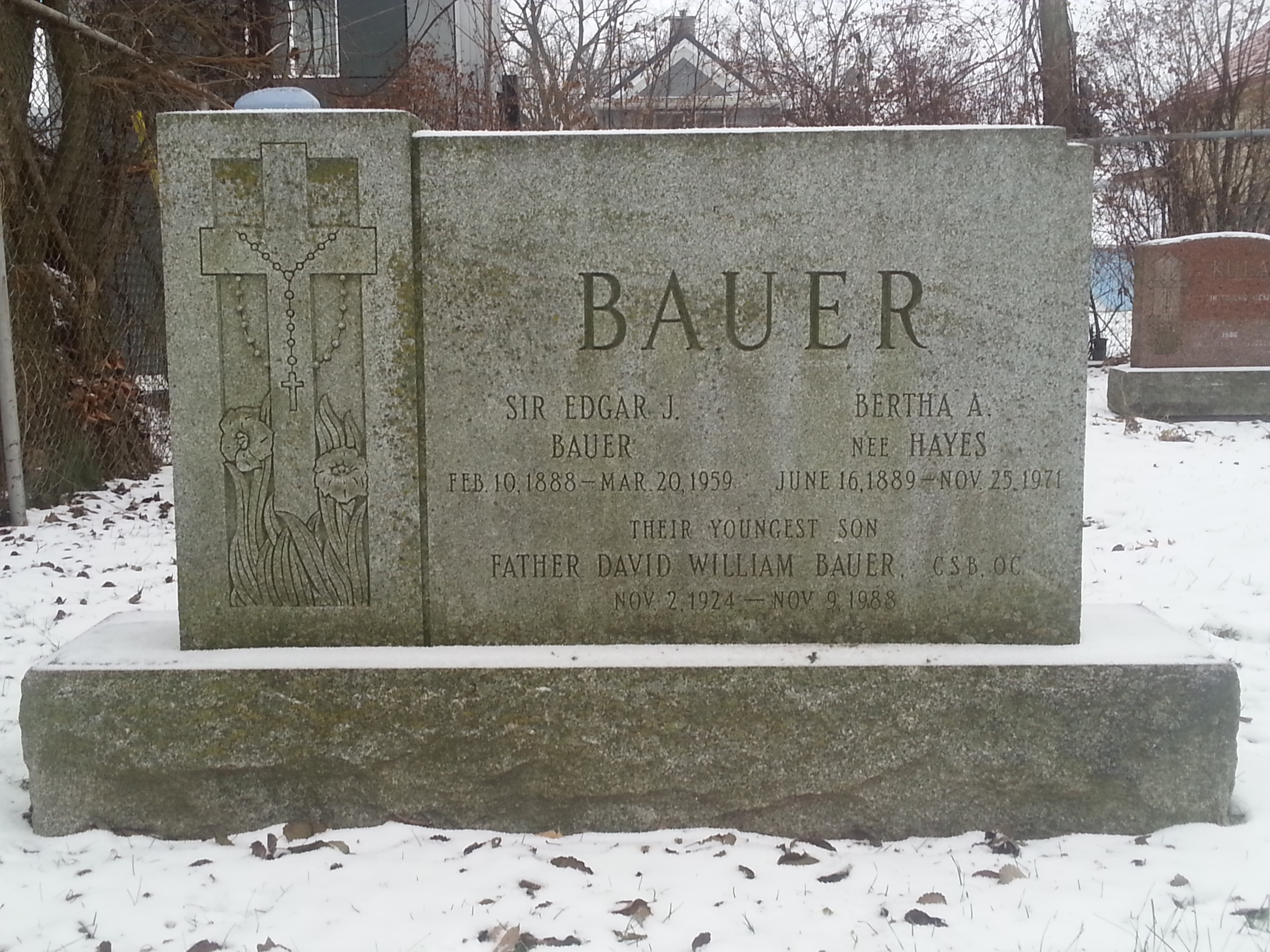
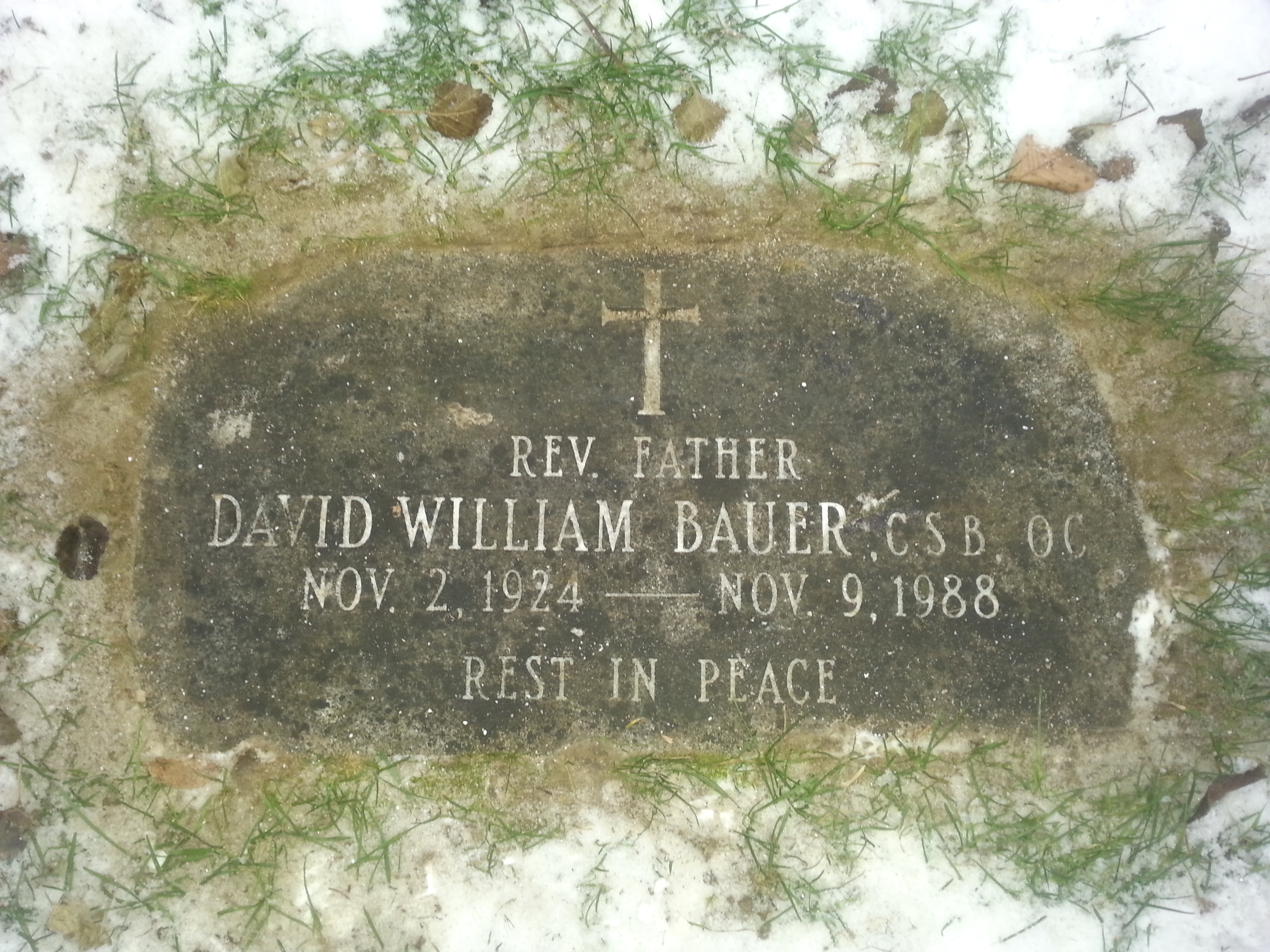
Bauer's grave markers in Mount Hope Cemetery

Bauer was invited to assist the China men's national ice hockey team in advance of them hosting Group C during the 1981 Ice Hockey World Championships. A relationship for clinics run by UBC instructors had been developed by Bob Hindmarch, but Bauer was unable to travel since he was infected with shingles at the time and recommended another coach instead.

Bauer was appointed vice-president of Hockey Canada in 1981, and chairman of the national team program for the 1984 Winter Olympics. He continued teaching at St. Mark's and assisting with the UBC Thunderbirds hockey team. He wanted to keep the same national team together from the 1980 Winter Olympics and raised $400,000 towards the next Olympics. His involvement with the national team gradually decreased until he was in an advisory role with Hockey Canada by 1984.

Bauer spent his last months resting at the family cottage in Bayfield, Ontario, after he had pancreatic surgery in July 1988. He died at the hospital in Goderich, Ontario from pancreatic cancer on November 9, 1988. He was remembered with services at St. Basil's Church in Toronto, and St. Louis Church in Waterloo, and was interred in the family plot in Mount Hope Cemetery in Waterloo.

== Coaching philosophy ==
Bauer was an advocate for players remaining in amateur hockey to receive an education, as opposed to the growing professionalism in the being detrimental to opportunities from learning. He felt that hockey was a means to teach the game of life and way for boys to become men, and modelled the national team after his experiences at St. Michael's. Bauer said that, "We try to give our players a well-rounded education, not merely ice skills but mental and moral conditioning as well". He stated that, "If you can improve the boy as a person he will improve as a hockey player". As a member of the Basilian Order, Bauer believed that education and the whole person were important and that an individual's relationship with God was only a portion of the whole.

Bauer frowned upon the use of foul language or fisticuffs, and wanted his players to be gentlemanly. He stressed discipline, teamwork and fair play. According to national team manager Rick Noonan, Bauer was gentle in his ways and "would consult and involve everybody" on the team.

== Impact on players ==
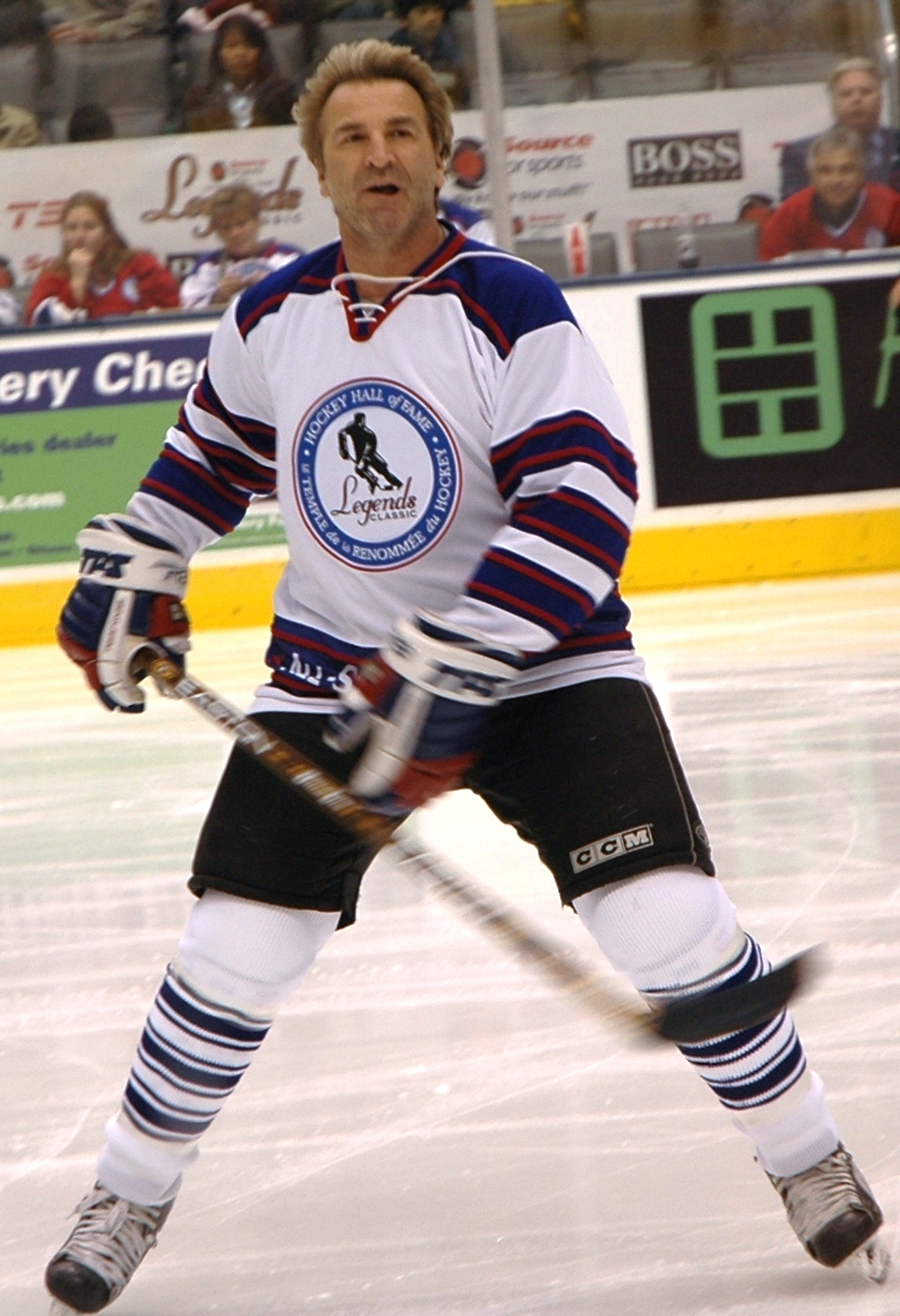
Glenn Anderson in 2008

Bauer had an impact on players for the Canadian national team. Glenn Anderson stated that, "Bauer's influence on me knows no bounds. Although he knew the game inside and out, he was more concerned with the human spirit. He had such an inner strength. And it rubbed off on me. I was blessed to have met him, while he walked among us. Bauer taught us more than a game, but how to have faith in ourselves to be the best". Brian Conacher said, "I know that had I not played for Father Bauer, I would never have made it to the NHL. He taught me the discipline and the skills that were lacking. Father Bauer was very involved in the mental, physical and spiritual well-being of all his players. He truly was like a father to this whole group of guys. He was a very inspirational kind of coach. He left an indelible mark on every young man that he came in contact with".

== Honours and awards ==
Bauer was among the inaugural appointees of the Order of Canada when it was established in 1967. He was appointed an officer of the Order of Canada on July 6, 1967, for his contribution to ice hockey and the Canadian national team. The formal investiture was made by the Governor General of Canada on November 24, 1967. Bauer was inducted into both the Waterloo County Hall of Fame, and the Waterloo County Sports Hall of Fame in 1972. He was inducted into Canada's Sports Hall of Fame as a builder for ice hockey in 1973.

Bauer was posthumously inducted into the Hockey Hall of Fame in the builder category in 1989, the Olympic Hall of Fame in 1992, the UBC Sports Hall of Fame in the builder category in 1996, the IIHF Hall of Fame in the builder category in 1997, the BC Hockey Hall of Fame in 2009, and the Ontario Sports Hall of Fame in 2012.

== Legacy ==
The Canadian Press described Bauer as, "The kindly Roman Catholic priest who brought a reluctant Canadian hockey fraternity into the modern age of international play with his concept of a national team". Canada's national team was called "the most nobly conceived of all Canadian hockey enterprises" in the book Hockey Is Our Game by Jim Coleman. Bauer was "an inspirational coach, a caring educator, a master motivator" and "devoted to the concept that education and hockey could mix", according to Kevin Shea of The Hockey Hall of Fame. Brian Conacher stated that, "Father Bauer, in many respects, was a visionary, a pioneer in recognizing how good European hockey had become. It became evident that the Canadian style — rough and tumble, we'll beat them in the alley if we can’t beat them on the rink type of attitude — was passé".

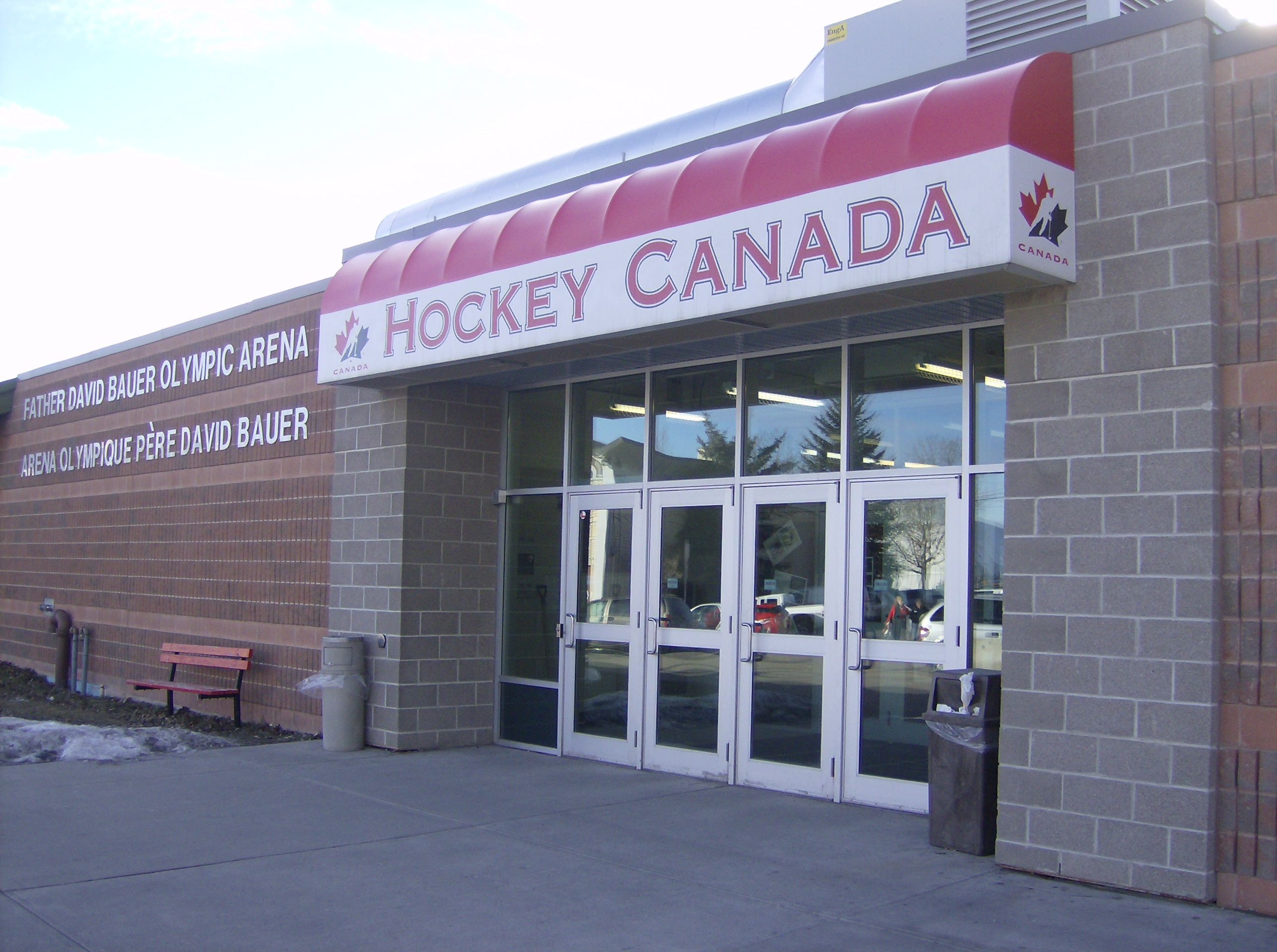
Father David Bauer Olympic Arena in Calgary

Rick Noonan stated, "The fact that father was a Basilian priest, he used to worry about that a lot, that people would misinterpret that he was trying to turn everyone into a Catholic. But really, he was very ecumenical. Should a player take the Lord's name in vain in the heat of the moment during a game, he would find a gentle hand on his shoulder: "Now, now, I do the praying around here". Tom Watt who was an assistant coach for the national team stated, "Father Bauer is a great Canadian, but I could never get it straight — sometimes when you thought you were talking about hockey, the priest came out of him and sometimes when you thought you were talking to a priest the hockey came out of him".

Bauer is the namesake of two hockey arenas, including the Father Bauer Arena which opened in 1963 at the University of British Columbia, and the Father David Bauer Olympic Arena in Calgary which was named for him in 1986 and served as a training facility for the Canadian national team. He is also the namesake of a street named Father Bauer Drive in Waterloo.

Scholarships awarded by St. Michael's College School and the University of British Columbia are named for Bauer. Funds from the sale of the Bauer's family cottage were donated to endow the Quest Program to assist in communicating faith by electronic means at the Athol Murray College of Notre Dame in Wilcox, Saskatchewan.

The foundation of the national team was featured in a Heritage Minutes clip, and Bauer was subject of the biographical book Father Bauer and The Great Experiment by Greg Oliver.

== Bibliography ==
- Oliver, Greg (2017). Father Bauer and the Great Experiment: The Genesis of Canadian Olympic Hockey. Toronto, Ontario: ECW Press. ISBN 978-1-77041-249-1.
- Lapp, Richard M.; Macaulay, Alec (1997). The Memorial Cup: Canada's National Junior Hockey Championship. Madeira Park, British Columbia: Harbour Publishing. ISBN 1-55017-170-4.
- McKinley, Michael (2014). It's Our Game: Celebrating 100 Years Of Hockey Canada. Toronto, Ontario: Viking Press. ISBN 978-0-670-06817-3.
- Brown, Babe; Attersley, Bobby (1978). A History of the Oshawa Generals. Vol. One. Toronto, Ontario: Chimo Publishing. ISBN 0-920344-07-0.
- Young, Scott (1989). 100 Years of Dropping the Puck. Toronto, Ontario: McClelland & Stewart. ISBN 0-7710-9093-5.
