= Royal Canadian Postal Corps =

Former administrative corps of the Royal Canadian Army

The Royal Canadian Postal Corps
- Active: Established 3 May 1911 as The Canadian Postal Corps; redesignated The Royal Canadian Postal Corps on 20 June 1961; disbanded some time after the unification of The Canadian Forces.
- Country: Canada
- Type: Corps
- Role: (Canadian Army) Permanent Active Militia
- Mottos: Servire Armatis (Latin, "Serve the Soldier")
- March: Postal "First Post"

The Royal Canadian Postal Corps (RCPC) was an administrative corps of the Canadian Army. The Canadian Postal Corps was redesignated The Royal Canadian Postal Corps on 20 June 1961. The badge of The Royal Canadian Postal Corps consists of a horn, with a Queen's Crown on top. Superimposed at the center of the horn is the text RCPC. At the bottom the text "Servire Armatis" is written on a ribbon.

== Unification ==
When the Army, Royal Canadian Navy, and Royal Canadian Air Force were merged in 1968 to form the Canadian Forces, the administrative Corps of the Army were deactivated and merged with their Naval and Air Force counterparts to form the Canadian Forces' personnel branches.

The Royal Canadian Postal Corps, Royal Canadian Army Service Corps clerical trades, and Royal Canadian Army Pay Corps were merged to form the Administration Branch (later merged with the Logistics Branch). The postal services offered by the present-day Canadian Forces are known as Canadian Forces Postal service.

== Notable members ==
- Father David Bauer (1924–1988), Basilian priest, founder of the Canada men's national ice hockey team and inductee into the Hockey Hall of Fame
