= Royal Canadian Army Pay Corps =

Former administrative corps of the Royal Canadian Army

- Active: Disbanded/Decommissioned/Inactive
- Country: Canada
- Type: Corps
- Role: (Canadian Army) Permanent Active Militia responsible for administering all financial matters.
- Mottos: Honi Soit Qui Mal Y Pense (French, "Shame to Him Who Thinks Evil of It"; from the motto of the Order of the Garter)
- March: "March of the Logistics Branch"

The Royal Canadian Army Pay Corps (RCAPC) was an administrative corps of the Canadian Army with its own cap badge, and other insignia and traditions. It was established in 1906 as the Canadian Army Pay Corps. It was responsible for administering all financial matters.

The Canadian Army Pay Corps began officially operating on 1 July 1907. It was redesignated the Royal Canadian Army Pay Corps on 1 Nov 1920. In 1967 the corps was amalgamated with other units into the Logistics Branch of the newly formed Canadian Forces.

== Unification ==
When the Army, Royal Canadian Navy, and Royal Canadian Air Force were merged in 1968 to form the Canadian Forces, the administrative Corps of the Army were deactivated and merged with their Naval and Air Force counterparts to form the Canadian Forces' personnel branches defined in Canadian Forces Administrative Orders (CFAOs) as "...cohesive professional groups...based on similarity of military roles, customs and traditions." CFAO 2-10)

- The Royal Canadian Army Pay Corps, Royal Canadian Army Service Corps clerical trades and the Royal Canadian Postal Corps were merged to form the Administration Branch (later merged with the Logistics Branch)
- The Royal Canadian Army Service Corps transport and supply elements were combined with the Royal Canadian Ordnance Corps to form the Logistics Branch

== Related units ==
This unit was allied with the following:

- Royal Army Pay Corps
