= Outline of the Canadian Armed Forces at the end of the Cold War =

The following is a hierarchical outline for the Canadian Armed Forces at the end of the Cold War. It is intended to convey the connections and relationships between units and formations.

Following the 1967 Canadian Forces Reorganization Act the Canadian Army, Royal Canadian Navy and Royal Canadian Air Force were amalgamated in 1968 as the Canadian Armed Forces. Since then the Chief of Defence Staff is directly responsible for all services and commands of the Canadian Armed Forces and advises the Canadian Government in all military matters. Policy is developed in the Armed Forces Council, which is made up of the commanders of the functional commands.

In 1989 the Canadian Armed Forces had 84,600 active personnel, 7,800 of which were female, and 21,300 reserve personnel, 4,200 of which were female. Around three quarters of all military occupation were open to women in 1989 and the government actively pursued a policy to open more occupations to women. The 1987 Defence White Paper "Challenge and Commitment" called for an expansion of the reserve forces to approximately 90,000 troops, however with the end of the Cold War this plan was shelved.

The article is based on the Canadian government's 1987 White Paper "A Defence Policy for Canada" (Link), which was published at the end of 1987. The White Paper served as basis for the overall structure and the equipment numbers. The article was then expanded with information from the Canadian Armed Forces Annual Historical Reports, which provided a complete listing of all units in existence in 1989. Additional information came from the linked Wikipedia articles, a German brochure about the Canadian Forces based in Germany (Link) and the current Canadian Armed Forces website and the unit histories listed there.

== National Defence Headquarters ==
- National Defence Headquarters, in Ottawa
  - Communications Security Establishment, in Ottawa, signals intelligence agency
  - Assistant Deputy Minister (Materiel), responsible for acquiring, introducing and supporting Canadian Armed Forces equipment
  - Rescue Coordination Centres at CFB Halifax, CFB Trenton, CFB Edmonton and CFB Esquimalt
  - Canadian Forces Support Unit (Ottawa)
  - 1 Canadian Forces Logistics Liaison Unit (Liaison with suppliers in North America)
  - Canadian Defence Liaison Staff London, UK
  - Canadian Defence Liaison Staff Washington, USA
  - Canadian Forces Military Police
    - Canadian Forces Protective Services Unit, in Ottawa
    - Canadian Forces Service Prison and Detention Barracks, at CFB Edmonton
  - Canadian Forces Northern Area, in Yellowknife
    - Canadian Rangers, HQ in Ottawa
      - 1st Canadian Ranger Patrol Group covering Northwest Territories, Yukon Territory and Nunavut
      - 2 Canadian Ranger Patrol Group covering Northern Quebec
      - 3 Canadian Ranger Patrol Group covering Northern Ontario
      - 4 Canadian Ranger Patrol Group covering Northern Manitoba, British Columbia, Saskatchewan and Alberta
      - 5 Canadian Ranger Patrol Group covering Northern Newfoundland
  - Defence Intelligence Office
    - Canadian National Distributing Authority (Cryptography)
    - Canadian Forces Photographic Unit
    - Mapping and Charting Establishment
    - Special Investigation Unit (Counter-Intelligence Unit)

=== Logistics Support Group ===
- Logistics Support Group
  - Aerospace Engineering Test Establishment
  - Aerospace Maintenance Development Unit
  - Canadian Forces Ammunition Depot Angus, at CFB Borden
  - Canadian Forces Ammunition Depot Bedford, in Bedford
  - Canadian Forces Ammunition Depot Dundurn, at CFAD Dundurn
  - Canadian Forces Ammunition Depot Det Edmonton, at CFB Edmonton
  - Canadian Forces Ammunition Depot Rocky Point, in Metchosin
  - Canadian Forces Parachute Maintenance Depot, in CFB Edmonton(Greisbach)
  - Canadian Forces Personnel Applied Research Unit
  - Canadian Forces Postal Unit
  - Canadian Forces Publications Depot
  - 1 Canadian Forces Supply Depot at CFB Toronto
  - 5 Canadian Forces Supply Depot at CFB Moncton
  - 7 Canadian Forces Supply Depot at CFB Edmonton
  - 4^{e} Unité de contrôle des mouvements des Forces canadiennes (4 Canadian Forces Movement Control Unit), at CFB Montreal
  - 3^{e} Unité de soutien du Canada (3 Canadian support unit)
  - 25^{e} Dépôt d'approvisionnement des Forces canadiennes (25 Canadian Forces Supply Depot), at CFB Montreal
  - 202^{e} Dépôt d'ateliers (202 Workshop Depot), at CFB Montreal
  - Land Engineering Test Establishment, Orleans, Ontario
  - Quality Engineering Test Establishment
  - Centre d'essai et d'expérimentation (Testing and Experimentation Center)
  - Centre d'essais techniques (mer) (Engineering Test Establishment (Sea))
  - DND Fire Protection Service

==== Defence Research and Development Canada ====
- Defence Research and Development Canada, in Ottawa
  - Defence Research Establishment Atlantic, in Dartmouth
  - Defence Research Establishment Valcartier, at CFB Valcartier
  - Defence Research Establishment Ottawa – National Aeronautical Establishment, in Shirleys Bay
  - Defence Research Establishment Toronto, at CFB Toronto
    - Defence and Civil Institute of Environmental Medicine
  - Defence Research Establishment Suffield, at CFB Suffield
  - Defence Research Establishment Pacific, at CFB Esquimalt
  - Operational Research Analysis Establishment

==== Recruiting ====
- National Defence Headquarters, in Ottawa
  - Canadian Forces Recruiting Zone West, in Edmonton
    - Canadian Forces Recruiting Centre Calgary
    - Canadian Forces Recruiting Centre Edmonton
      - Detachment Yellowknife
    - Canadian Forces Recruiting Centre Saskatoon
      - Detachment Regina
    - Canadian Forces Recruiting Centre Vancouver
  - Canadian Forces Recruiting Zone Central, in Ottawa
    - Canadian Forces Recruiting Centre Hamilton
    - Canadian Forces Recruiting Centre London
    - Canadian Forces Recruiting Centre Ottawa
    - Canadian Forces Recruiting Centre Sudbury
    - Canadian Forces Recruiting Centre Toronto
      - Detachment Peterborough
  - Zone de recrutement des Forces canadiennes Québec, in Montreal
    - Centre de recrutement des Forces canadiennes Montreal
      - Detachment Saint-Jérôme
    - Centre de recrutement des Forces canadiennes Québec
    - Centre de recrutement des Forces canadiennes Rimouski
      - Détachement Sept-Îles
    - Centre de recrutement des Forces canadiennes Rouyn
    - Centre de recrutement des Forces canadiennes Sherbrooke
    - Centre de recrutement des Forces canadiennes Trois-Rivières
  - Canadian Forces Recruiting Zone Atlantic, in Halifax
    - Canadian Forces Recruiting Centre Halifax
    - Canadian Forces Recruiting Centre St. John's
    - Canadian Forces Recruiting Centre Saint John

== Mobile Command ==
Mobile Command controlled all land force units based in Canada and trained and prepared ground troops for the deployment to Canadian Forces Europe. Mobile Command's major formations were two brigade groups and an ad hoc special service force. Recognisably an army formation but not under Mobile Command, 4 Canadian Mechanized Brigade Group was in West Germany under the control of 1 Canadian Division (Forward) and Canadian Forces Europe. Mobile Command also commanded 106 major and 25 minor reserve units of the Canadian Militia. Active forces amounted to 22,500 troops with 15,500 reserve forces.

In case of war men Air Command's Air Transport Group would have flown about 1,400 men from 1 Canadian Mechanized Brigade Group to Germany to bring 4 Canadian Mechanized Brigade Group up to wartime strength, while 5 Canadian Mechanized Brigade Group would have been shipped over the Atlantic as reinforcements for 1 Canadian Division (Forward). Special Service Force would have contributed a battalion group centered around 1st Battalion, The Royal Canadian Regiment to NATO's Allied Mobile Force (Land) (AMF(L)). The Airborne Regiment was destined for defence operations in Canada.

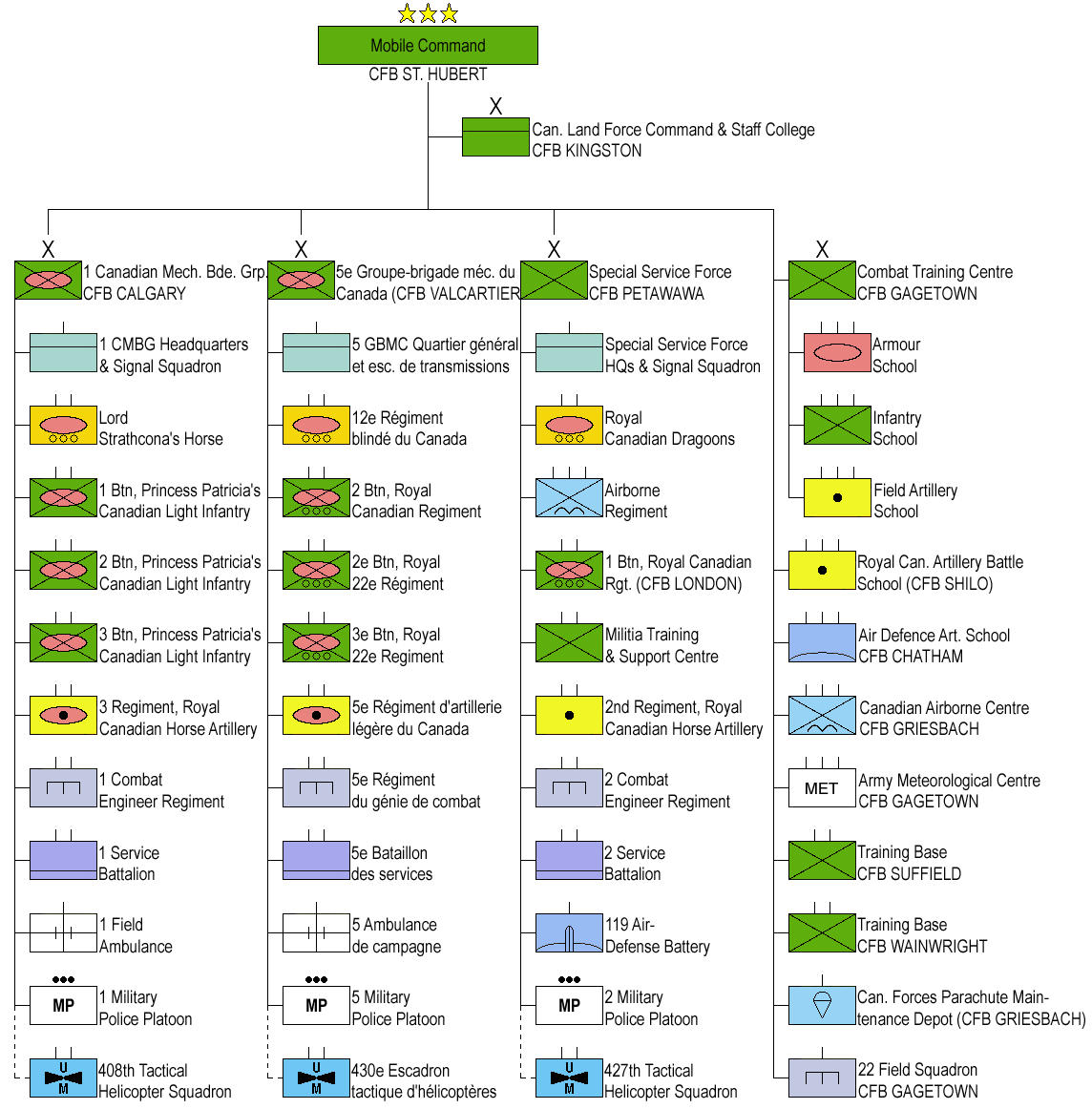
Structure of Mobile Command in 1989 (click to enlarge)

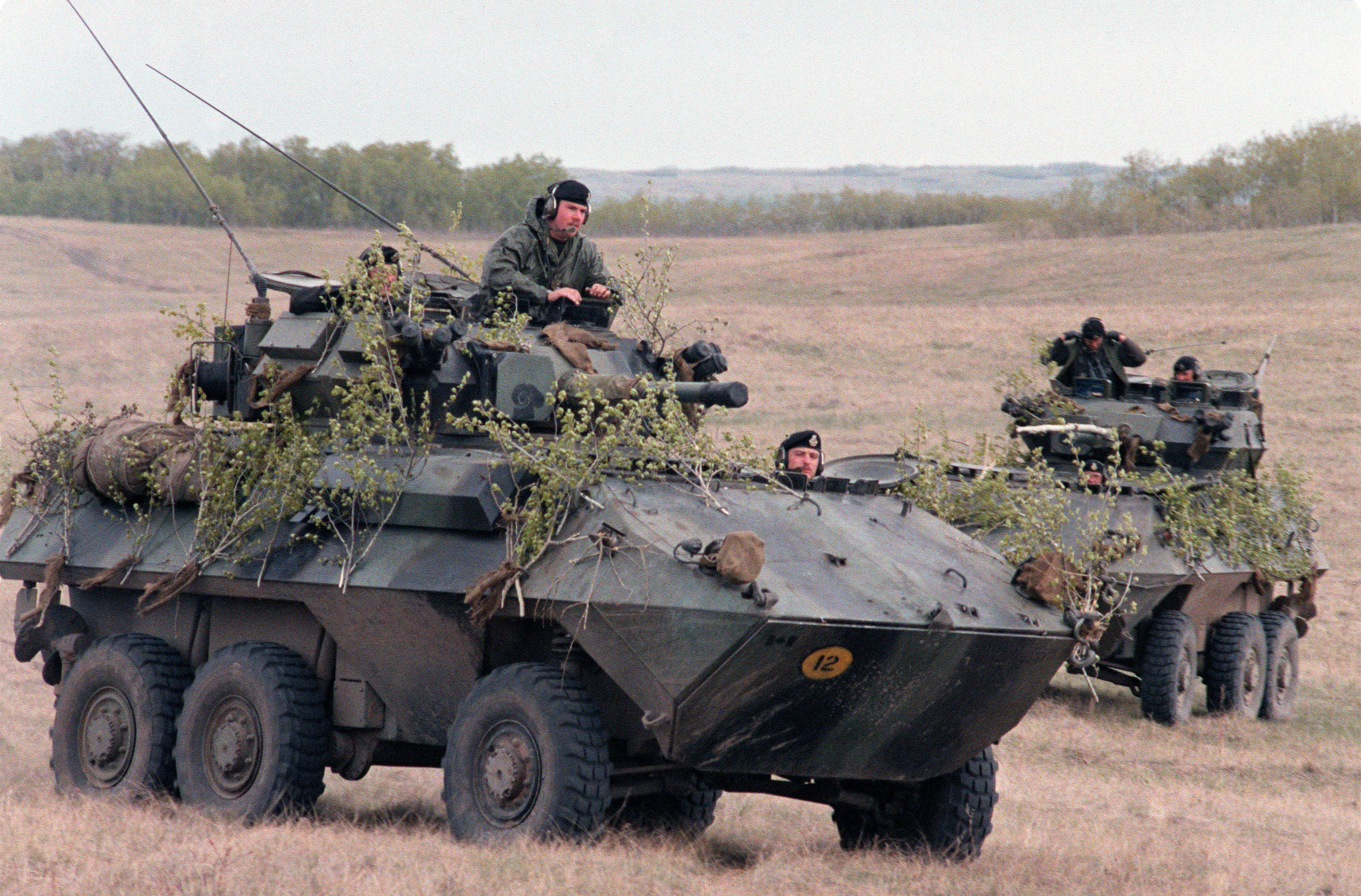
Two Cougars maneuver in a field during exercise Rendezvous '83 at CFB Wainwright in 1983.

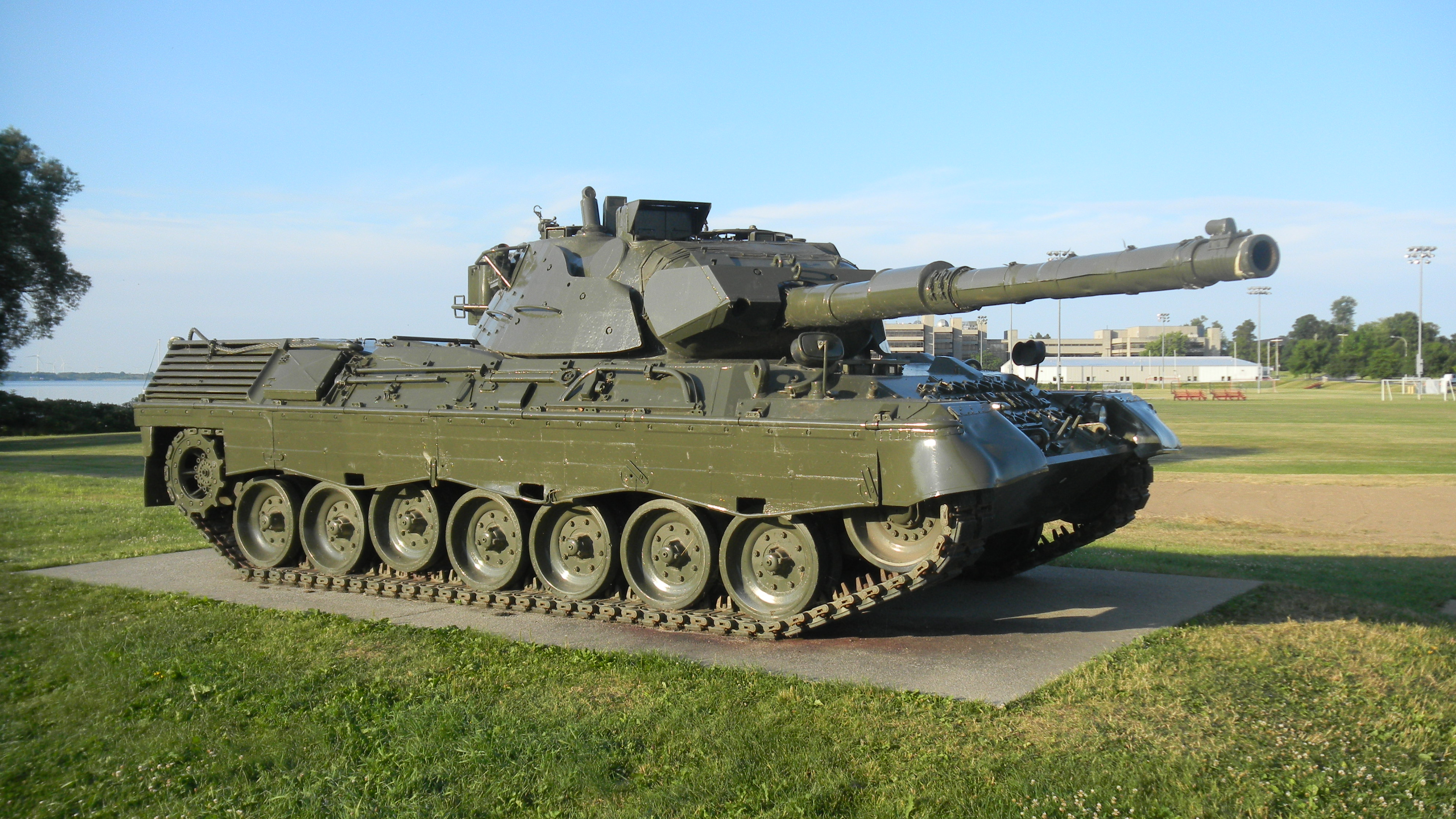
A Leopard C1 main battle tank.

- Canadian Forces Mobile Command, at CFB St. Hubert
  - CFB Shilo
    - Royal Canadian Artillery Battle School
  - CFB Gagetown
    - Combat Training Centre
      - Armour School, 37x Leopard C1
      - Field Artillery School
      - Infantry School
    - Army Meteorological Centre
    - 22 Field Squadron (Canadian Military Engineers)
  - CFB Suffield training base
  - CFB Wainwright training base
  - CFB Edmonton (Griesbach)
    - Canadian Airborne Centre
  - CFB Chatham (Air Command Base)
    - Air Defence Artillery School
  - Canadian Land Force Command and Staff College, at CFB Kingston

=== 1 Canadian Mechanized Brigade Group ===
- 1 Canadian Mechanized Brigade Group, at CFB Calgary
  - 1 CMBG Headquarters & Signal Squadron
  - Lord Strathcona's Horse (Note: Each Canada based Cavalry regiment fielded 38x Cougar fire support vehicles and 23x Lynx reconnaissance vehicle)
  - 1st Btn, Princess Patricia's Canadian Light Infantry (Note: Each infantry battalion of 1 Canadian Mechanized Brigade Group fielded 2x M577, 65x M113 armored personnel carriers, 11x Lynx, 18x M113 TUA with TOW, 24x M125 with an 81 mm mortars)
  - 2nd Btn, Princess Patricia's Canadian Light Infantry
  - 3rd Btn, Princess Patricia's Canadian Light Infantry
  - 3rd Regiment, Royal Canadian Horse Artillery (Note: Each artillery battalion of 1 and 5 Canadian Mechanized Brigade Group fielded: 2x M577, 25x M109A4, 46x M113, 24x M548)
  - 1st Combat Engineer Regiment
  - supported by 408th Tactical Helicopter Squadron part of 10 Tactical Air Group of Air Command
  - 1 Service Battalion
  - Princess Patricia's Canadian Light Infantry Battle School
  - 1 Field Ambulance
  - 1 Military Police Platoon

=== 5 Canadian Mechanized Brigade Group ===
- 5 Groupe-brigade mécanisé du Canada, (Note: This brigade had formed the Canadian Air-Sea Transportable Brigade Group and would in wartime have supported NATO forces in Norway. In case of war, Canada thus would have had to support one brigade each in two far apart theatres of war. In 1987, the Canadian government therefore decided to make 5 Canadian Mechanized Brigade Group a wartime support for the German theatre, bringing its contribution there to division strength.) at CFB Valcartier
  - 5^{e} GBMC Quartier général et escadron de transmissions
  - 12^{e} Régiment blindé du Canada
  - 2nd Btn, Royal Canadian Regiment (Note: Each infantry battalion of 5 Canadian Mechanized Brigade Group and the infantry battalion of Special Service Force fielded: 48x Grizzly, 11x Lynx)
  - 2^{e} Btn, Royal 22^{e} Régiment
  - 3^{e} Btn, Royal 22^{e} Regiment
  - 5^{e} Régiment d'artillerie légère du Canada
  - 5^{e} Régiment du génie de combat
  - supported by 430^{e} Escadron tactique d'hélicoptères part of 10 Tactical Air Group of Air Command
  - 5 Bataillon des services
  - Royal 22^{e} Régiment École de combat
  - 5^{e} Ambulance de campagne
  - 5 Military Police Platoon

=== Special Service Force ===
- Special Service Force, at CFB Petawawa
  - Special Service Force Headquarters and Signal Squadron
  - Royal Canadian Dragoons
  - Airborne Regiment
    - Airborne Headquarters and Signal Squadron
    - 1^{er} Commando Aéroporte, associated with Royal 22^{e} Régiment
    - 2nd Airborne Commando, associated with Princess Patricia's Canadian Light Infantry
    - 3rd Airborne Commando, associated with Royal Canadian Regiment
    - 4th Airborne Commando (Reserve, formed from a company headquarters and 2x platoons from Queen's Own Rifles of Canada and 1x platoon from Loyal Edmonton Regiment)
    - 5th Airborne Commando (Reserve, formed from a company headquarters and 2x platoons from Le Régiment du Saguenay and 1x platoon from Royal Westminster Regiment)
    - Airborne Service Commando (providing combat service support)
  - 1st Btn, Royal Canadian Regiment, at CFB London
  - 2nd Regiment, Royal Canadian Horse Artillery, E Battery airborne qualified, 24x 105mm M 56 pack howitzers
  - 2 Combat Engineer Regiment, provides one airborne troop
  - supported by 427th Tactical Helicopter Squadron part of 10 Tactical Air Group of Air Command
  - 2 Service Battalion
  - Royal Canadian Regiment Battle School
  - Militia Training and Support Centre
  - 119 Air Defense Battery, Air Defense Anti-Tank Systems
  - 2 Military Police Platoon

=== Militia ===
The Militia was the primary reserve of Mobile Command and headquartered in Ottawa. Maritime and air reserve formations were part of Maritime Command, respectively Air Command, while communication reserve units were part of the Canadian Forces Communication Command. In wartime the Militia would provide ground units for defence operations in Canada and elsewhere in North America, as well as replacements for the Canadian land force units fighting in the European war theatre. The Militia would also provide lightly armed guards to protect military vital points, and make major contributions to the logistic and medical organizations required to support Canadian Forces overseas. In total the militia fielded 106 major and 25 minor units with 15,500 men. Major units were regiments or battalions, although they seldom exceeded the strength of a company, while minor units were independent artillery batteries, and engineer squadrons. The militia was organized in five militias areas, which were subdivided into militia districts.

In case of war the Militia Areas would have become division commands with the responsibility to conduct all military ground operations in their area. In 1989 the Militia consisted of the following units:

==== Pacific Militia Area ====
- Pacific Militia Area, in Vancouver covering British Columbia
  - Victoria Militia District, in Victoria (Merged with the Vancouver Militia District in 1990)
    - The British Columbia Dragoons, in Kelowna
    - The Rocky Mountain Rangers, in Kamloops
    - The Canadian Scottish Regiment (Princess Mary's), in Victoria
    - 5th (British Columbia) Field Artillery Regiment, RCA, in Victoria
    - 54th Field Engineer Squadron, in Chilliwack
    - 11 (Victoria) Service Battalion, in Victoria
  - Vancouver Militia District, in Vancouver
    - The British Columbia Regiment (Duke of Connaught's Own), in Vancouver
    - The Royal Westminster Regiment, in New Westminster (provides 1x airborne platoon to the Airborne Regiment)
    - The Seaforth Highlanders of Canada, in Vancouver
    - 15th Field Artillery Regiment, RCA, in Vancouver
    - 6th Field Engineer Squadron, in Vancouver
    - 17th Field Engineer Squadron, in Kimberley
    - 44th Field Engineer Squadron, in Trail
    - 12 (Vancouver) Service Battalion, in Richmond

==== Prairie Militia Area ====
- Prairie Militia Area, in Winnipeg covering Alberta, Manitoba, Saskatchewan and Northwestern Ontario
  - Southern Alberta Militia District, in Calgary (Merged with the Northern Alberta Militia District in 1989)
    - The King's Own Calgary Regiment (RCAC), in Calgary
    - The Calgary Highlanders, in Calgary
    - 14 (Calgary) Service Battalion, in Calgary
    - 20th Independent Field Battery, RCA, in Lethbridge Alberta
  - Northern Alberta Militia District, in Edmonton
    - South Alberta Light Horse, in Edmonton
    - The Loyal Edmonton Regiment (4th Battalion, Princess Patricia's Canadian Light Infantry), in Edmonton (provides 1x airborne platoon to the Airborne Regiment)
    - 20th Field Artillery Regiment, RCA, in Edmonton
    - 8th Field Engineer Regiment, in Edmonton
    - 15 (Edmonton) Service Battalion, in Edmonton
  - Saskatchewan Militia District, in Regina (Merged with the Manitoba-Lakehead Militia District in 1991)
    - The Saskatchewan Dragoons, in Moose Jaw
    - The North Saskatchewan Regiment, in Saskatoon
    - The Royal Regina Rifles, in Regina
    - 10th Field Artillery Regiment, RCA, in Regina
    - 16 (Saskatchewan) Service Battalion, in Saskatoon and Regina
    - 21st Field Engineer Squadron, in Flin Flon
  - Manitoba-Lakehead Militia District, in Winnipeg
    - The Fort Garry Horse, in Winnipeg
    - The Royal Winnipeg Rifles, in Winnipeg
    - The Queen's Own Cameron Highlanders of Canada, in Winnipeg
    - 26th Field Artillery Regiment, RCA, in Brandon
    - 17 (Winnipeg) Service Battalion, in Winnipeg
    - 31st Field Engineer Squadron, in Winnipeg
  - Thunder Bay Militia District, in Thunder Bay (Merged with the Manitoba-Lakehead Militia District in 1989)
    - The Lake Superior Scottish Regiment, in Thunder Bay
    - 18 (Thunder Bay) Service Battalion, in Thunder Bay
    - 116th Independent Field Battery, RCA, in Kenora

==== Central Militia Area ====
- Central Militia Area, in Toronto covering Ontario
  - Windsor Militia District, in Windsor (Merged with the London Militia District in December 1989)
    - The Windsor Regiment (RCAC), in Windsor
    - The Essex and Kent Scottish, in Windsor
    - 21 (Windsor) Service Battalion, in Windsor
  - London Militia District, in London
    - 1st Hussars, in London
    - The Elgin Regiment (RCAC), in St. Thomas
    - 4th Battalion, The Royal Canadian Regiment, in London
    - The Grey and Simcoe Foresters, in Owen Sound
    - 56th Field Artillery Regiment, RCA, in Brantford
    - 22 (London) Service Battalion, in London
    - 7th Field Engineer Squadron, in St. Thomas
  - Hamilton Militia District, in Hamilton (Merged with the London Militia District)
    - The Royal Hamilton Light Infantry (Wentworth Regiment), in Hamilton
    - The Lincoln and Welland Regiment, in St. Catharines
    - The Highland Fusiliers of Canada, in Cambridge
    - The Argyll and Sutherland Highlanders of Canada (Princess Louise's), in Hamilton
    - 11th Field Artillery Regiment, RCA, in Guelph
    - 23 (Hamilton) Service Battalion, in Hamilton
    - 48th Field Engineer Squadron, in Waterloo
  - Toronto Militia District, in Toronto
    - The Governor General's Horse Guards, in Toronto
    - The Queen's York Rangers (1st American Regiment) (RCAC), in Toronto
    - The Queen's Own Rifles of Canada, in Toronto (provides 2x airborne platoons and a company headquarters to the Airborne Regiment)
    - The Royal Regiment of Canada, in Toronto
    - The Lorne Scots (Peel, Dufferin and Halton Regiment), in Brampton
    - 48th Highlanders of Canada, in Toronto
    - The Toronto Scottish Regiment, Toronto
    - 7th Toronto Regiment, RCA, in Toronto
    - 2nd Field Engineer Regiment, in Toronto
    - 25 (Toronto) Service Battalion, in Toronto
  - Northern Ontario Militia District, in North Bay (Merged with the Ottawa Militia District)
    - The Algonquin Regiment, in North Bay
    - 2nd Btn, The Irish Regiment of Canada, in Sudbury
    - The Lanark and Renfrew Scottish Regiment, in Pembroke
    - 49th Field Artillery Regiment, RCA, in Sault Ste. Marie
    - 26 (North Bay) Service Battalion, in North Bay
  - Ottawa Militia District, in Ottawa
    - The Ontario Regiment (RCAC), in Oshawa
    - Governor General's Foot Guards, in Ottawa
    - The Princess of Wales' Own Regiment, in Kingston
    - The Hastings and Prince Edward Regiment, in Belleville
    - The Brockville Rifles, in Brockville
    - Stormont, Dundas and Glengarry Highlanders, in Cornwall
    - The Cameron Highlanders of Ottawa, in Ottawa
    - 30th Field Artillery Regiment, RCA, in Ottawa
    - 28 (Ottawa) Service Battalion, in Ottawa
    - 3rd Field Engineer Squadron, in Ottawa
    - 5th Field Engineer Squadron, in Ottawa

==== Atlantic Militia Area ====
- Atlantic Militia Area, in Halifax covering New Brunswick, Newfoundland, Nova Scotia, and Prince Edward Island
  - Eastern New Brunswick Militia District, in Saint John
    - 2nd Btn, The Royal New Brunswick Regiment, in Bathurst
    - 31 (Saint John) Service Battalion, in Saint John
  - Western New Brunswick District Militia District, in CFB Moncton (Merged with Eastern New Brunswick Militia District in 1992)
    - 1st Btn, The Royal New Brunswick Regiment, in Fredericton
    - 32 (Moncton) Service Battalion, in Moncton
  - Western Nova Scotia Militia District, in Halifax
    - The Princess Louise Fusiliers, in Halifax
    - West Nova Scotia Regiment, in Aldershot
    - 1st (Halifax-Dartmouth) Field Artillery Regiment, RCA, in Halifax
    - 33 (Halifax) Service Battalion, in Halifax
    - 84th Independent Field Battery, RCA, in Yarmouth
    - 20th Field Engineer Squadron, in Halifax
  - Cape Breton Militia District, in Sydney (Merged with the Western Nova Scotia Militia District in 1992)
    - 1st Btn, The Nova Scotia Highlanders (North), in Truro
    - 2nd Btn, The Nova Scotia Highlanders (Cape Breton), in Sydney
    - 45th Field Engineer Squadron, in Sydney
    - 35 (Sydney) Service Battalion, in Sydney
  - Newfoundland Militia District, in St. John's
    - 1st Btn, Royal Newfoundland Regiment, in St. John's
    - 2nd Btn, Royal Newfoundland Regiment, in Grand Falls-Windsor
    - 3rd Field Artillery Regiment, RCA, in St. John's
    - 56th Field Engineer Squadron, in St. John's
    - 36 (Newfoundland) Service Battalion, in St. John's
  - Prince Edward Island Militia District, in Charlottetown (Merged with the Eastern New Brunswick Militia District in 1992)
    - The Prince Edward Island Regiment (RCAC), in Charlottetown

==== Quebec Militia Area ====
- Quebec Militia Area, in Montreal covering Quebec
  - Montreal Militia District (Milice du district 1 du Québec), in Montreal
    - The Royal Canadian Hussars (Montreal), in Montreal
    - Le Régiment de Hull (RCAC), in Gatineau
    - The Canadian Grenadier Guards, in Montreal
    - The Black Watch (Royal Highland Regiment) of Canada, in Montreal
    - 4th Battalion, Royal 22^{e} Régiment (Châteauguay), in Laval
    - 6th Battalion, Royal 22^{e} Régiment, in Saint-Hyacinthe
    - Les Fusiliers Mont-Royal, in Montreal
    - Le Régiment de Maisonneuve, in Montreal
    - The Royal Montreal Regiment, in Westmount
    - 2^{e} Régiment d'artillerie de campagne, ARC, in Montreal
    - 3^{e} Régiment du génie, in Westmount
    - 51 (Montreal) Bataillon des services, in Montreal
  - Sherbrooke Militia District (Milice du district 2 du Québec), in Sherbrooke (Merged with the Quebec Militia District)
    - Sherbrooke Hussars, in Sherbrooke
    - Les Fusiliers de Sherbrooke, in Sherbrooke
    - 52 (Sherbrooke) Bataillon des services, in Sherbrooke
  - Quebec Militia District (Milice du district 3 du Québec), in Quebec City
    - 12^{e} Régiment blindé du Canada (Militia), in Trois-Rivières
    - Les Voltigeurs de Québec, in Quebec City
    - Les Fusiliers du S^{t}-Laurent, in Rimouski
    - Régiment de la Chaudière, in Lévis
    - Le Régiment du Saguenay, in Saguenay (provides 2x airborne platoons and a company headquarters to the Airborne Regiment)
    - 6^{e} Régiment d'artillerie de campagne, ARC, in Lévis
    - 62^{e} Régiment d'artillerie de campagne, ARC, in Shawinigan
    - 55 (Quebec City) Bataillon des services, in Quebec City
    - 9^{e} Escadron du génie, in Rouyn-Noranda
    - 10^{e} Escadron du génie, in Sainte-Foy
    - 15^{e} Escadron du génie, in Quebec City

Reserve units of the Royal Canadian Armoured Corps (RCAC) were equipped with Cougar and Grizzly armoured vehicles.
Reserve units of the Royal Regiment of Canadian Artillery (RCA) were equipped with 105 mm C1 howitzers and 81 mm mortars.

== Air Command ==
Canadian Forces Air Command (AIRCOM) unified all flying assets of the Canadian Armed Forces in one command. It provided combat-ready air forces for the surveillance and control over Canadian airspace and for the defence of North America. It also provided air groups for other commands:

- Maritime Air Group provided Maritime Command with anti-submarine helicopters and airplanes
- 10 Tactical Air Group provided Force Mobile Command with tactical helicopters
- 1 Canadian Air Division Canada's aerial contribution to NATO's aerial defense

The other air groups of Air Command remained under its operational control, however in case of war two of Fighter Group's fighter squadrons were assigned as reinforcement to 1 Air Division in Germany, while its other two fighter squadrons were assigned as air defence assets to the Canadian NORAD Region. Air Command fielded only two wings: 3 and 4 Wing, as part of 1 Air Division, to fulfill NATO operational requirements. All other units fell under operational control of the bases they operated from. A key unit of Air Command was 437 Transport Squadron, which in case of crisis would have flown Canadian reinforcements from 1 Canadian Mechanized Brigade Group to Germany to augment the strength of 4 Canadian Mechanized Brigade Group. Together with the US Air Force Air Command operated the Distant Early Warning Line of radar stations on the edge of Canada's arctic North. Beginning in 1988 the Distant Early Warning Line was upgraded with more powerful radars and automated to reduce personnel requirements.

- Headquarters Canadian Forces Air Command, at CFB Winnipeg
  - CFB Penhold
    - Canadian Forces School of Air Reserve Training
    - Canadian Forces Junior Leader School
  - CFB Summerside
    - Canadian Forces Junior Leader School
  - CFB Edmonton
    - Canadian Forces School of Aeromedical Training
    - Canadian Forces Survival Training School
    - Canadian Forces School of Traffic and Movements
  - CFB Borden (Canadian Forces Training System Base)
    - Air Command Academy
    - Canadian Forces Aircrew Selection Centre
    - Canadian Forces School of Aerospace Technology and Engineering
  - CFB North Bay
    - Air Weapons Control and Countermeasures School
    - Air Force Indoctrination School

=== Fighter Group/Canadian NORAD Region ===
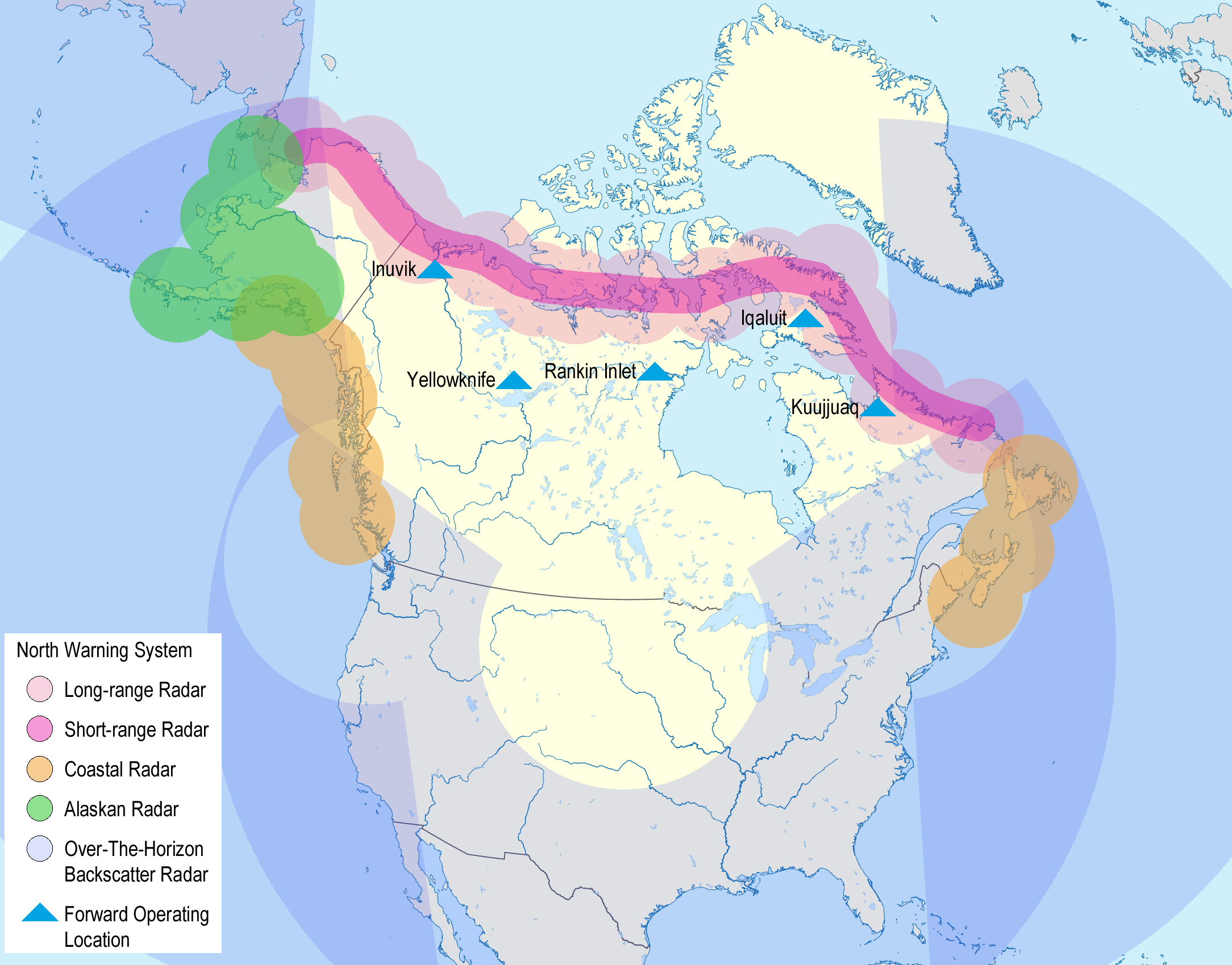
North Warning System as part of NORAD's radar array as envisioned by Canada and the US in 1987

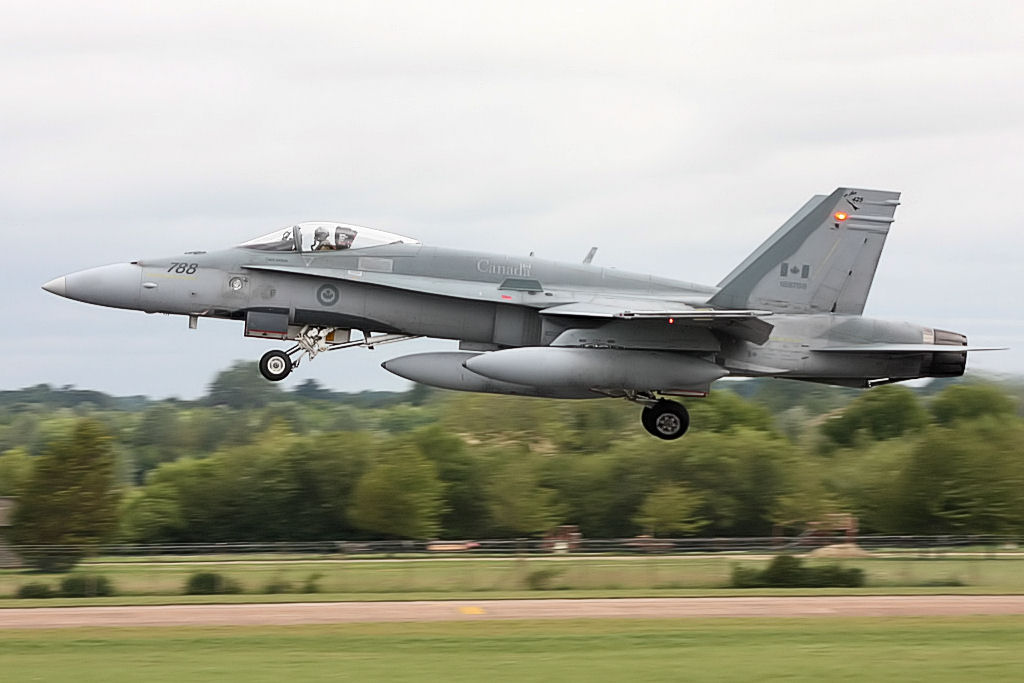
CF-18 Hornet takes off

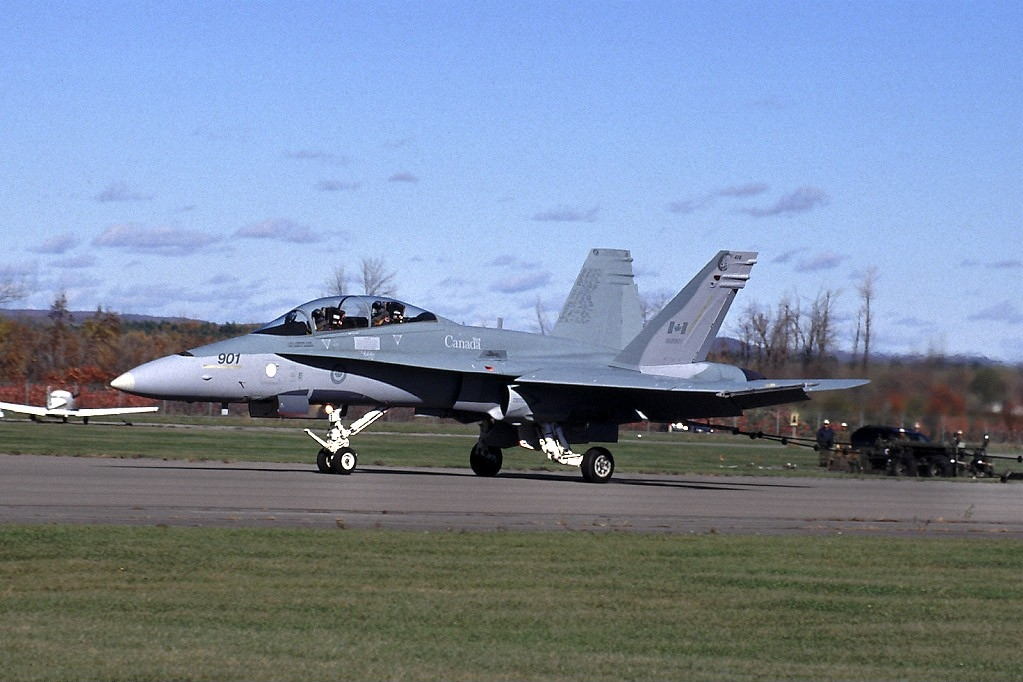
CF-18B Hornet landing.

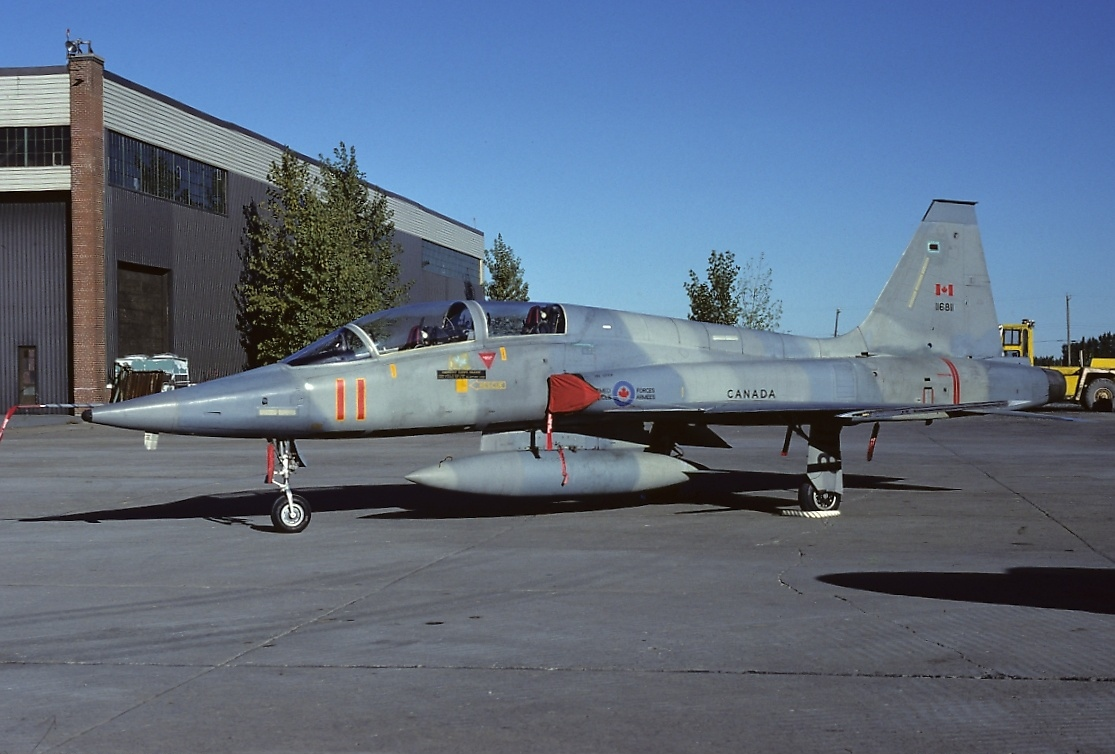
A CF-5 Freedom Fighter at CFB St. Hubert.

After the United States and Canada signed the North American Air Defence Modernization Agreement during the Shamrock Summit on 18 March 1985 Canada's air defence was undergoing a major restructuring: in 1987 Fighter Group was merged Canadian NORAD Region to create a unified air defence command for Canada. In the same year Canada began to replace the Distant Early Warning Line (DEW) radar sites across the Canadian Arctic with the more modern North Warning System (NWS) radars.

NWS stretched from Alaska across the Canadian Arctic at approximately the 70th parallel and extended down the Canadian East Coast to Labrador. Unlike the manned DEW radars the NWS radars consisted of minimally manned long-range radars and unmanned short-range gap-filler radars. Therefore, Canada began to disband its 19 radar squadrons, with only six being left by 1989, four of which were coastal radars: three on the East Coast and one on the West Coast. The original NWS plan called for the installation of a further four coastal radars along the Canadian West Coast and Southeast Alaska.

- Fighter Group/Canadian NORAD Region at CFB North Bay under operational control of NORAD
  - CFB North Bay
    - 22 Radar Control Wing
      - 21 Aerospace Control and Warning Squadron operating Sector Operations Control Centre East
        - 12 Radar Squadron, at CFS Mont Apica
        - 23 Radar Squadron, at CFS Barrington (Coastal radar site)
        - 221 Radar Squadron, at CFS Sydney (Coastal radar site)
        - 226 Radar Squadron, at CFB Gander (Coastal radar site)
      - 51 Aerospace Control and Warning Squadron operating Sector Operations Control Centre West
        - 42 Radar Squadron, at CFB Cold Lake
        - 501 Radar Squadron, at CFS Holberg (Coastal radar site)
    - 414 Composite (Electronic Warfare) Squadron, CC-117 Falcon, replaced with CC-144 Challenger in 1989
    - Canadian Forces Support Unit Colorado Springs, at NORAD HQ at Peterson Air Force Base
    - Canadian Detachment Elmendorf, at Elmendorf Air Force Base
    - Canadian NORAD Region Forward Operating Locations at Yellowknife, Inuvik, Rankin Inlet, Iqaluit and Kuujjuaq (expansion underway)
  - CFB Cold Lake, one CF-18 squadron would have reinforced 3 Wing at CFB Baden–Söllingen in Germany
    - Communication and Air Traffic Control Squadron
    - 410 Tactical Fighter Operational Training Squadron, CF-18 Hornet
    - 416 Tactical Fighter Squadron, CF-18 Hornet
    - 441 Tactical Fighter Squadron, CF-18 Hornet
    - 419 Tactical Fighter Training Squadron, CF-5D Freedom Fighter
    - Maintenance Squadron
    - 4 Software Engineering Squadron, maintaining CF-18 Hornet soft- and hardware
    - 10 Field Technical Training Squadron, training CF-18 technicians
  - CFB Bagotville, one CF-18 squadron would have reinforced 3 Wing at CFB Baden–Söllingen in Germany
    - Communication and Air Traffic Control Squadron
    - 425^{e} Escadron d'appui tactique, CF-18 Hornet
    - 433^{e} Escadron d'appui tactique, CF-18 Hornet
    - 8 Air Communications and Control Squadron (deployable unit)
    - Maintenance Squadron
  - CFB Chatham
    - Communication and Air Traffic Control Squadron
    - 434 Tactical Fighter Squadron, CF-5A Freedom Fighter, disbanded 17 March 1989
    - Satellite Identification and Tracking Unit, at Detachment St. Margarets, part of NORAD's Space Object Identification Centre
    - Maintenance Squadron

=== Maritime Air Group ===
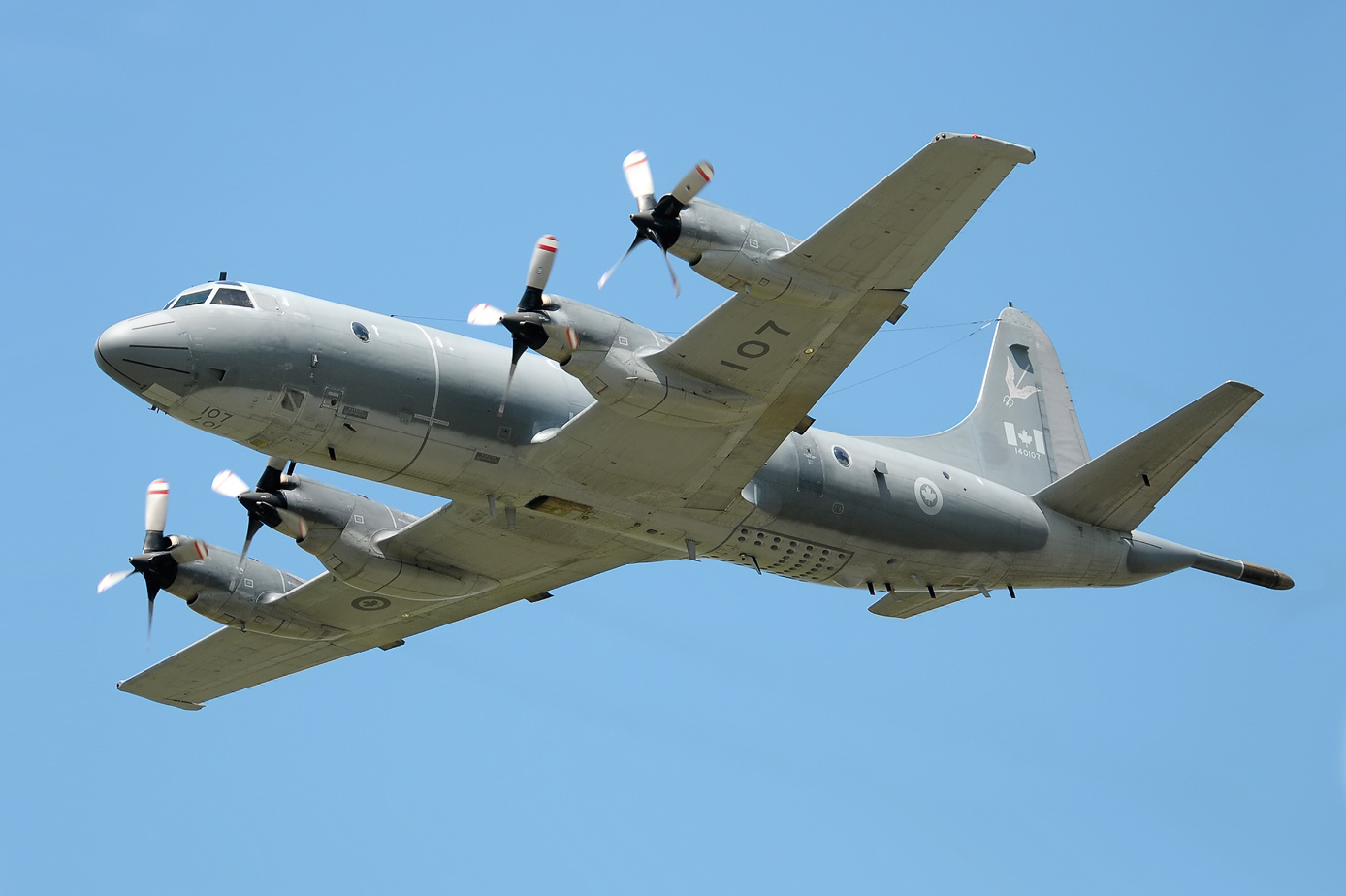
A CP-140 Aurora during landing approach.

- Maritime Air Group, at CFB Halifax under operational control of Maritime Command
  - CFB Shearwater
    - Communication and Air Traffic Control Squadron
    - 406 Maritime Operational Training Squadron, CH-124 Sea King
    - 423 Helicopter Anti-Submarine Squadron, CH-124 Sea King
    - 443 Helicopter Anti-Submarine Squadron, CH-124 Sea King at Patricia Bay Heliport supporting Maritime Forces Pacific
    - Maintenance Squadron
  - CFB Greenwood
    - Communication and Air Traffic Control Squadron
    - 404 Maritime Patrol and Training Squadron, CP-140 Aurora
    - 405 Maritime Patrol Squadron, CP-140 Aurora
    - 415 Maritime Patrol Squadron, CP-140 Aurora
    - 14 Software Development Unit, maintaining CP-140 Aurora soft- and hardware
    - Maritime Proving and Evaluation Unit
    - Maintenance Squadron
  - CFB Comox
    - Communication and Air Traffic Control Squadron
    - 33 Utility Squadron, CP-121 Tracker, CT-133 Silver Star (Training and Naval Gunnery Target Towing)
    - 407 Maritime Patrol Squadron, CP-140 Aurora
    - 442 Transport and Rescue Squadron, CC-115 Buffalo, CH-113 Labrador part of Air Transport Group
    - Maintenance Squadron
  - CFB Summerside
    - Communication and Air Traffic Control Squadron
    - 413 Transport and Rescue Squadron, CC-115 Buffalo, CH-113 Labrador part of Air Transport Group
    - 420 Squadron (Air Reserve Unit twinned with 880 Maritime Reconnaissance Squadron)
    - 880 Maritime Reconnaissance Squadron, CP-121 Tracker
    - Maintenance Squadron

=== 10 Tactical Air Group ===
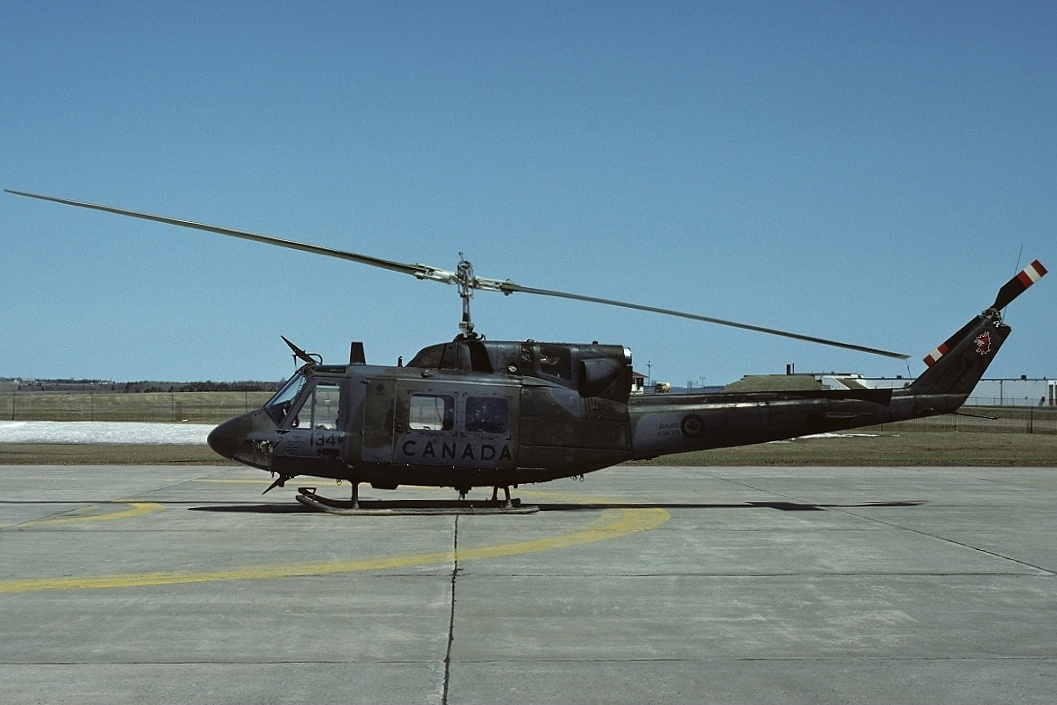
A CH-135 Twin Huey from 403 Helicopter Operational Training Squadron.

- 10 Tactical Air Group, at CFB St. Hubert under operational control of Mobile Command
  - CFB Toronto
    - Communication and Air Traffic Control Squadron
    - 400 Tactical Helicopter and Training Squadron (Air Reserve Unit), CH-136 Kiowa
    - 411 Tactical Helicopter Squadron (Air Reserve Unit), CH-136 Kiowa
    - Maintenance Squadron
  - CFB St. Hubert
    - Communication and Air Traffic Control Squadron
    - 401 Tactical Helicopter and Training Squadron (Air Reserve Unit), CH-136 Kiowa
    - 430^{e} Escadron tactique d'hélicoptères, CH-135 Twin Huey, CH-136 Kiowa supporting 5 Groupe-brigade mécanisé du Canada
    - 438^{e} Escadron tactique d'hélicoptères (Air Reserve Unit), CH-136 Kiowa
    - Maintenance Squadron
  - CFB Gagetown, main Mobile Command training base
    - Communication and Air Traffic Control Squadron
    - 403 Helicopter Operational Training Squadron, CH-118 Iroquois, CH-135 Twin Huey, CH-136 Kiowa
    - Air Ground Operations School
    - Maintenance Squadron
    - Petawawa Heliport
    - 427 Tactical Helicopter Squadron, CH-135 Twin Huey, CH-136 Kiowa supporting Special Service Force

=== Air Transport Group ===
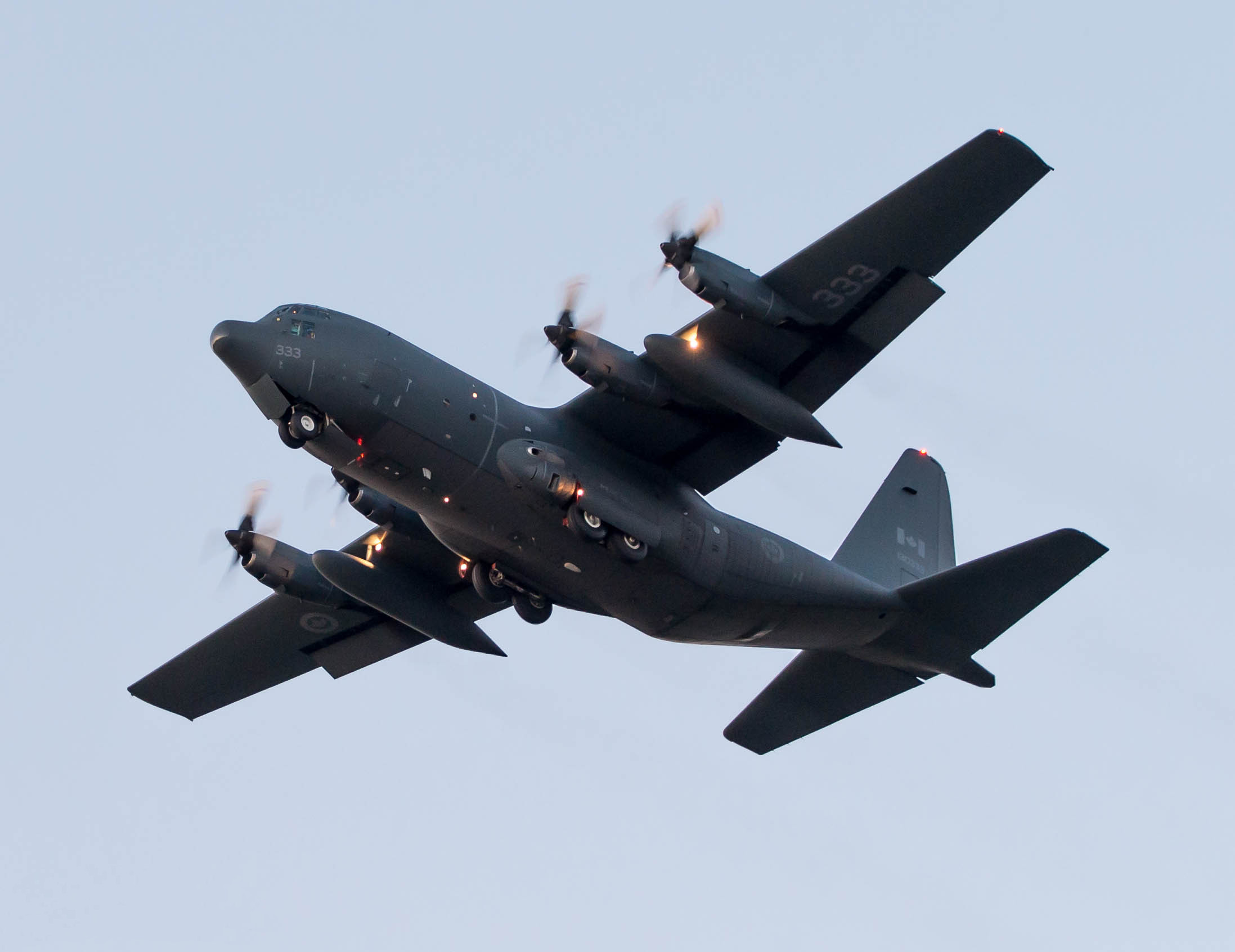
A CC-130E Hercules climbs to altitude.

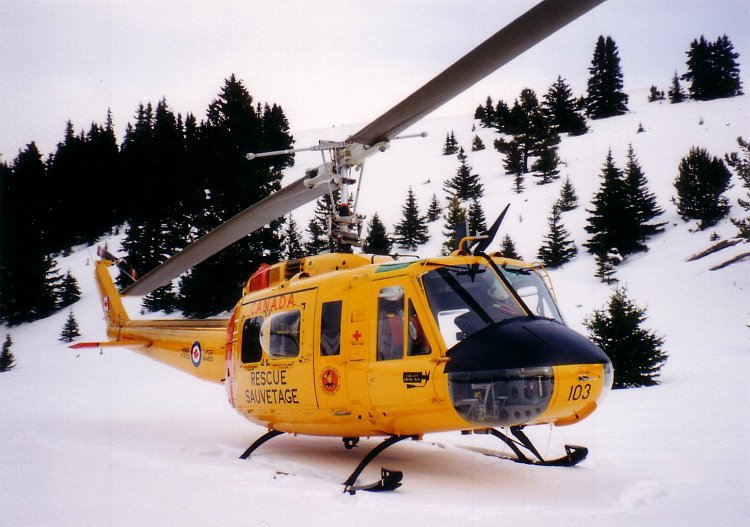
A CH-118 Iroquois in the Rocky Mountains of British Columbia, January 8, 1992.

- Air Transport Group at CFB Trenton
  - CFB Trenton
    - Communication and Air Traffic Control Squadron
    - CFD Mountain View
    - 424 Transport and Rescue Squadron, CC-115 Buffalo, CC-138 Twin Otter, CH-113 Labrador
    - 426 Transport Training Squadron, CC-130E Hercules part of 14 Air Training Group
    - 436 Transport Squadron, CC-130E Hercules
    - 437 Transport Squadron, CC-137 Husky
    - 2 Air Movements Squadron (Ground airlift support unit)
    - Maintenance Squadron
    - Terminal Radar and Control Systems Support and Training Unit
  - CFB Ottawa
    - Communication and Air Traffic Control Squadron
    - 412 Transport Squadron, CC-144 Challenger (Canadian VIP Transport), CC-109 Cosmopolitan being replaced by CT-142 Dash 8
    - 450 Transport Helicopter Squadron, CH-147 Chinook, CH-135 Twin Huey part of 10 Tactical Air Group
    - 3 Air Movements Squadron (Ground airlift support unit)
    - Maintenance Squadron
  - CFB Edmonton
    - Communication and Air Traffic Control Squadron
    - 408 Tactical Helicopter Squadron, CH-135 Twin Huey, CH-136 Kiowa part of 10 Tactical Air Group and supporting 1 Canadian Mechanized Brigade Group
    - 418 Squadron (Air Reserve Unit twinned with 440 Transport and Rescue Squadron)
    - 435 Transport and Rescue Squadron, CC-130E Hercules
    - 440 Transport and Rescue Squadron, CC-138 Twin Otter (Detachment at Yellowknife)
    - 447 Transport Helicopter Squadron, CH-147 Chinook part of 10 Tactical Air Group
    - 1 Air Movements Squadron (Ground airlift support unit)
    - Maintenance Squadron
    - Canadian Forces Parachute Maintenance Depot
  - CFB Gander
    - 103 Rescue Unit, CH-113 Labrador

=== 14 Air Training Group ===
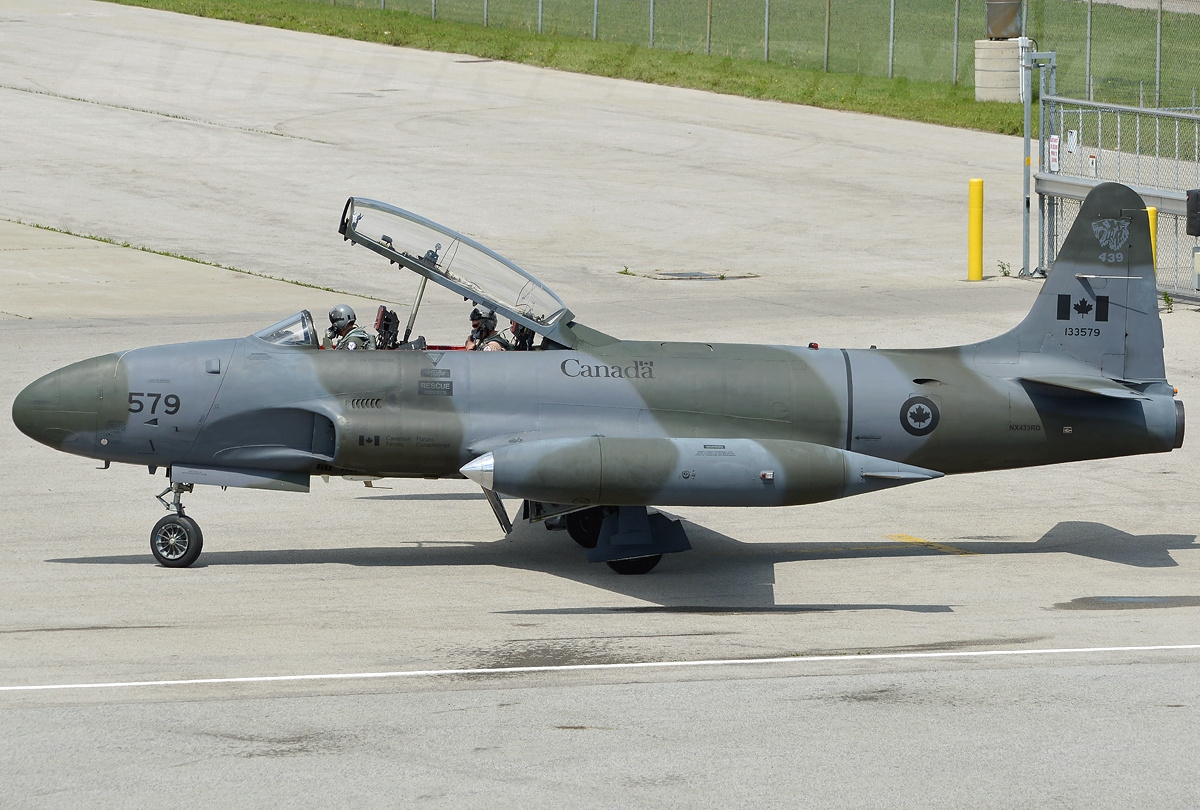
A CT-133 Silver Star.

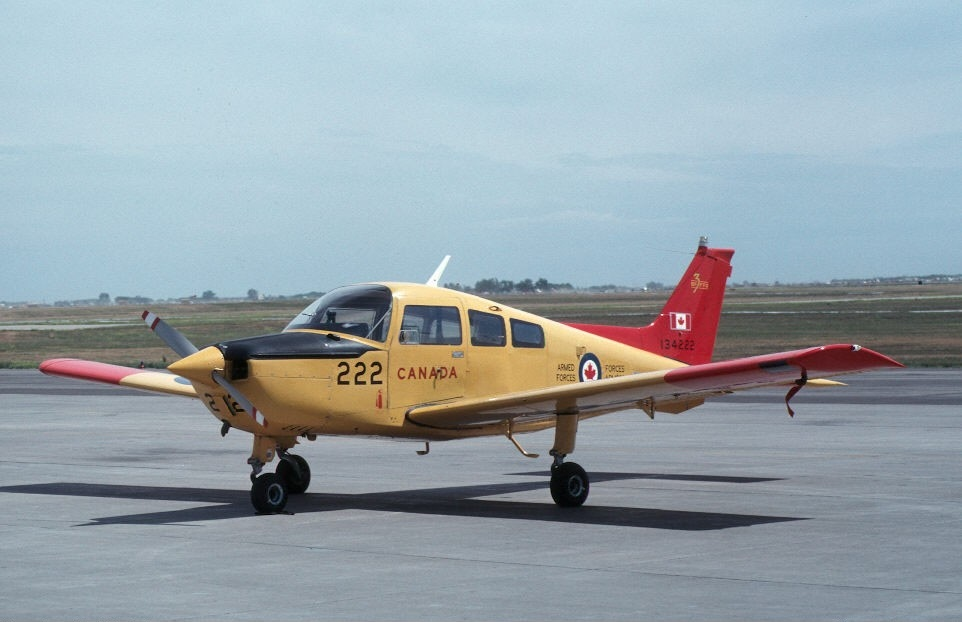
A 14 Air Training Group CT-134 Musketeer in 1980.

- 14 Air Training Group, at CFB Winnipeg
  - CFB Winnipeg
    - Communication and Air Traffic Control Squadron
    - 402 Transport and Training Squadron (Air Reserve Unit), CT-142 Dash 8
    - 429 Transport Squadron, CC-130E Hercules part of Air Transport Group
    - Central Flying School CT-134 Musketeer
    - Canadian Forces Air Navigation School
    - Canadian Forces School of Aerospace Studies
    - Maintenance Squadron
    - 1 Construction Engineering Unit
  - CFB Moose Jaw
    - Communication and Air Traffic Control Squadron
    - 2 Canadian Forces Flying Training School, CT-114 Tutor
    - 431 Air Demonstration Squadron, 11x CT-114 Tutor
    - Maintenance Squadron
  - CFB Portage la Prairie
    - Communication and Air Traffic Control Squadron
    - Flying Instructors School, CT-134 Musketeer
    - 3 Canadian Forces Flying Training School, CT-134 Musketeer, CH-139 Jet Ranger
    - Maintenance Squadron

=== Air Reserve ===
The Air Reserve consisted of one group headquarters, two wings, seven squadrons, and augmentation flights at 9 bases. Air Reserve Group was formed in 1976 to administer the 950 air reserve personnel, although units responded operationally to the regular force commanders at their bases.

- Air Command, at CFB Winnipeg
  - Air Reserve Group, at CFB Winnipeg
    - 1^{er} Escadre, at CFB St. Hubert
      - 401 Tactical Helicopter and Training Squadron
      - 438 Tactical Helicopter Squadron
    - 2 Wing, at CFB Toronto
      - 400 Tactical Helicopter and Training Squadron
      - 411 Tactical Helicopter Squadron
    - 402 Transport and Training Squadron, at CFB Winnipeg
    - 418 Squadron, at CFB Edmonton, twinned with 440 Transport and Rescue Squadron
    - 420 Squadron, at CFB Summerside, twinned with 880 Maritime Reconnaissance Squadron
    - Air Reserve Augmentation Flight Moose Jaw
    - Air Reserve Augmentation Flight Portage la Prairie
    - Air Reserve Augmentation Flight Summerside

== Maritime Command ==
Canadian Forces Maritime Command had its headquarters at CFB Halifax on Canada's Atlantic coast. It developed, trained and equipped Canada's naval forces. In wartime operational command would have been exerted by Commander Maritime Forces Atlantic (MARLANT) and Commander Maritime Forces Pacific (MARPAC) respectively. Commander of Maritime Forces Atlantic doubled-hatted as commander of NATO's Canadian Atlantic Sub-Area (CANLANT) command. CANLANT was an area command of Supreme Allied Commander Atlantic (SACLANT) and responsible to keep the Labrador Sea free from Soviet ships and submarines. As Soviet submarines passing under the ice of the Arctic Ocean and through the many channels of the Canadian Arctic Archipelago to reach the North Atlantic were seen as the biggest threat Canada's fleet fielded exclusively ships specialized in the anti-submarine role. Together with the US Navy Maritime Command operated a series the SOSUS underwater listening posts on the Atlantic Ocean's seabed to observe Soviet submarine operations in the Atlantic.

Air Command provided Maritime Command with a group of anti-submarine planes and helicopters. Maritime Command ships participated every year in NATO's Standing Naval Force Atlantic (STANAVFORLANT). After having built no new ships since 1973 Maritime Command began an ambitious construction program for 12 new Halifax-class frigates in 1987, the first of which began to enter service in 1992 and replaced all major surface combatants safe for the Iroquois-class destroyers.

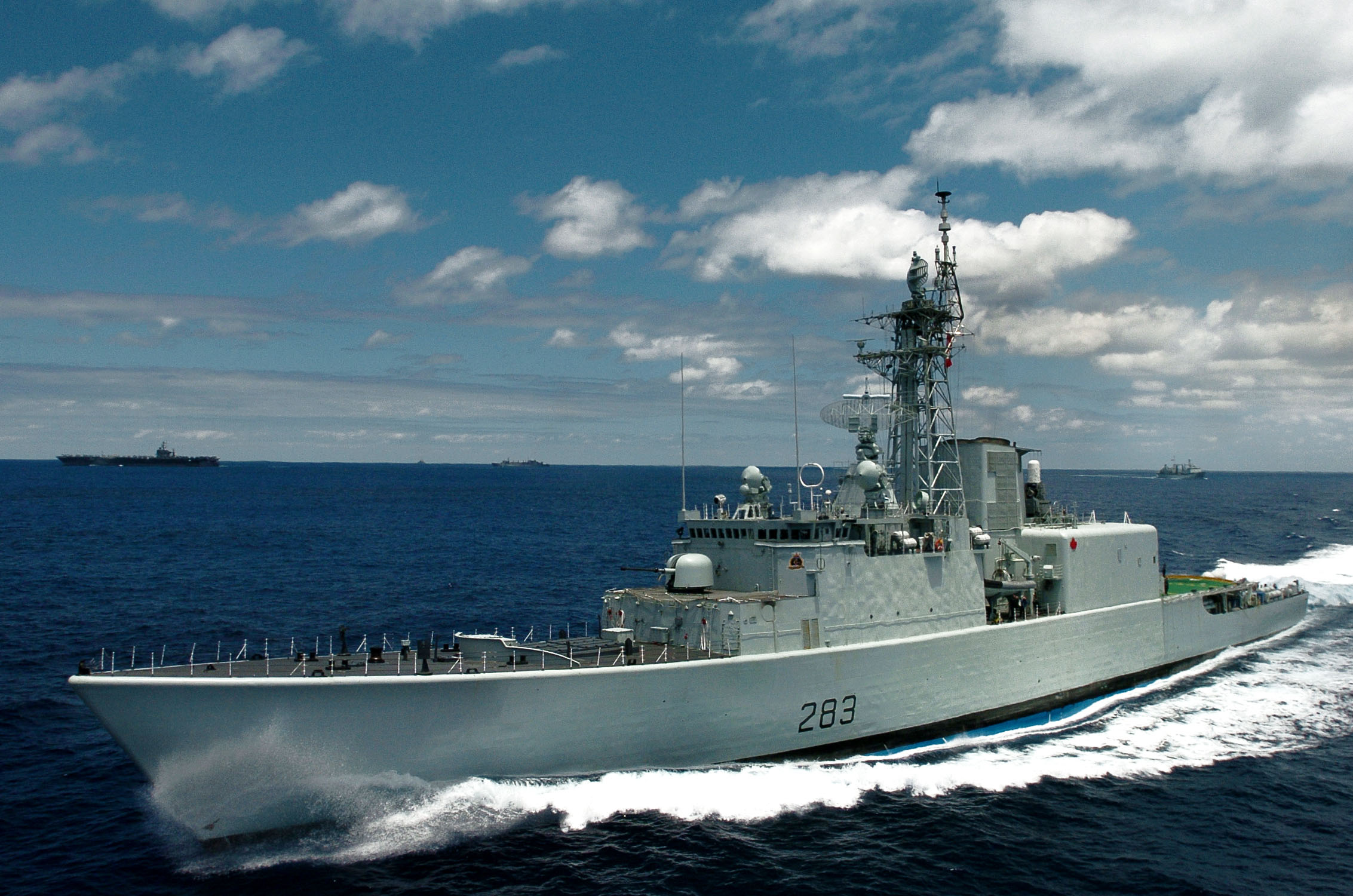
HMCS Algonquin (DDG 283) underway in the Pacific

- Canadian Forces Maritime Command (MARCOM), at CFB Halifax
  - Canadian Forces Base St. John's
  - Naval Station Argentia, joint Canadian-American SOSUS base
  - Canadian Forces Station Shelburne, Canadian SOSUS base
  - Canadian Forces Station Bermuda
  - Canadian Forces Maritime Experimental and Test Ranges, in Nanoose Bay

=== Maritime Forces Atlantic ===
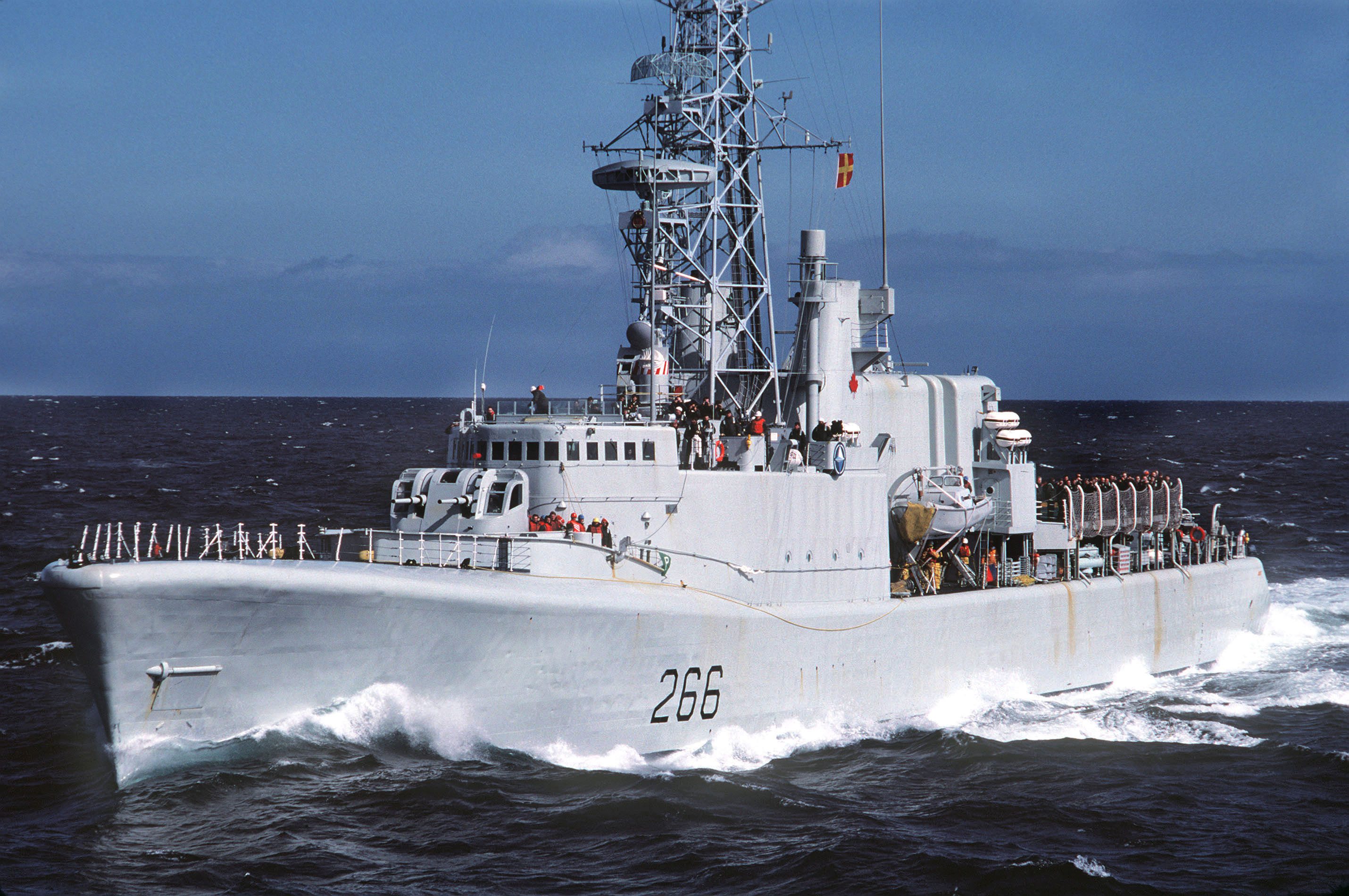
HMCS Nipigon (DDH 266) underway in the Atlantic during NATO Exercise "Ocean Safari '85".

- Maritime Forces Atlantic (MARLANT), at CFB Halifax
  - Canadian Forces Base Halifax
    - First Canadian Destroyer Squadron (CANDESRON 1):
      - Restigouche class: HMCS Kootenay (DDE 258)
      - St. Laurent class: HMCS Saguenay (DDH 206), HMCS Skeena (DDH 207), HMCS Ottawa (DDH 229), HMCS Margaree (DDH 230), HMCS Fraser (DDH 233)
    - Fifth Canadian Destroyer Squadron (CANDESRON 5):
      - Iroquois class: HMCS Iroquois (DDG 280), HMCS Athabaskan (DDG 282), HMCS Algonquin (DDG 283)
      - Annapolis class: HMCS Annapolis (DDH 265), HMCS Nipigon (DDH 266)
    - First Canadian Submarine Squadron (CANSUBRON 1):
      - Oberon class: HMCS Ojibwa (S72), HMCS Onondaga (S73), HMCS Okanagan (S74)
    - Reserve Training Unit Atlantic:
      - Porte-class boom defence vessels: HMCS Porte St. Jean (YNG 180), HMCS Porte St. Louis (YNG 183)
    - HMCS Cormorant (ASL 20), diving support vessel
    - HMCS Quest, oceanographic research/acoustic vessel
    - Protecteur class replenishment oiler: HMCS Protecteur (AOR 509), HMCS Preserver (AOR 510)
    - Anticosti class minesweeper: HMCS Anticosti (MSA 110), HMCS Moresby (MSA 112)
    - Wind class icebreaker: HMCS Labrador (AW 50)
    - Fire-class fireboat fireboat: CFAV Firebird (YTR 561)
    - Ville-class tug: CFAV Listerville (YTL 592), CFAV Merrickville (YTL 593), CFAV Marysville (YTL 594)
    - Glen-class tugboat: CFAV Glenevis (YTB 642), CFAV Glenbrook (YTB 643), CFAV Glenside (YTB 644)
  - Fleet Diving Unit (Atlantic)
  - Acoustic Data Analysis Centre (Atlantic)
  - Canadian Forces Maritime Warfare Centre
  - Canadian Forces Fleet School Halifax
  - Meteorological and Oceanographic Centre Halifax
  - Queen's Harbour Master Halifax
  - Fleet Maintenance Group Atlantic
    - Canadian Forces Ship Repair Unit (Atlantic)
    - Naval Engineering Unit (Atlantic), CFB Halifax

=== Maritime Forces Pacific ===
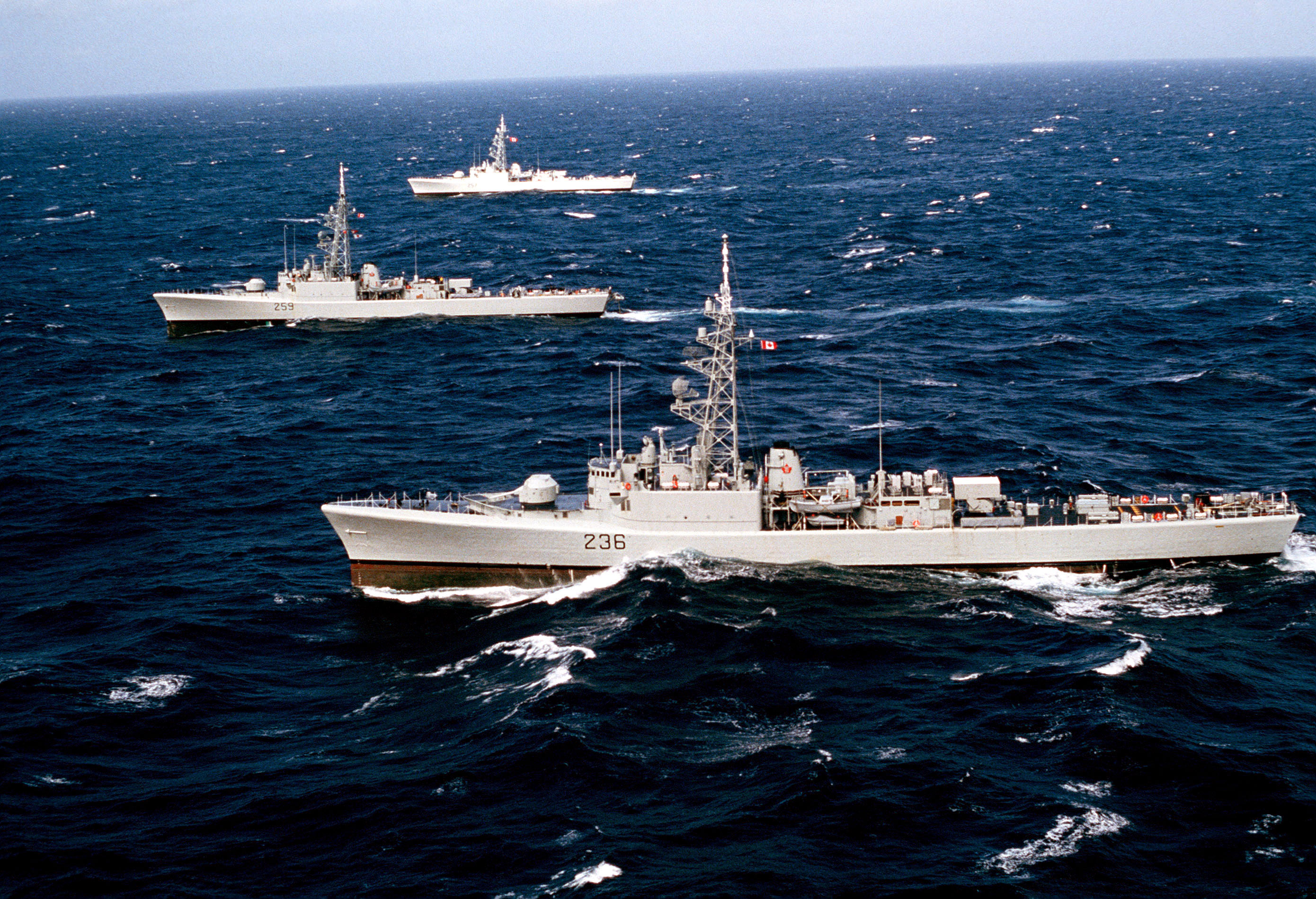
HMCS Restigouche, HMCS Terra Nova, and HMCS Gatineau during CINCPAC Exercise FLEETEX '83 near the Aleutian Islands of Alaska.

- Maritime Forces Pacific (MARPAC), CFB Esquimalt
  - Canadian Forces Base Esquimalt
    - Second Canadian Destroyer Squadron (CANDESRON 2):
      - Iroquois class: HMCS Huron (DDG 281)
      - Restigouche class: HMCS Restigouche (DDE 257), HMCS Terra Nova (DDE 259), HMCS Gatineau (DDE 236)
    - Fourth Canadian Destroyer Squadron (CANDESRON 4):
      - Mackenzie class: HMCS Mackenzie (DDE 261), HMCS Saskatchewan (DDE 262), HMCS Yukon (DDE 263), HMCS Qu'Appelle (DDE 264)
    - Training Group Pacific:
      - Porte-class boom defence vessels: HMCS Porte de la Reine (YNG 184), HMCS Porte Québec (YNG 185), HMCS Porte Dauphine (YNG 186)
      - Bay-class patrol boats: HMCS Fundy (PB 159), HMCS Chignecto (PB 160), HMCS Thunder (PB 161), HMCS Cowichan (PB 162), HMCS Miramichi (PB 163), HMCS Chaleur (PB 164)
    - Endeavour class oceanographic research vessel: HMCS Endeavour (AGOR 171)
    - HMCS Provider (AOR 508), replenishment oiler
    - CFAV Tillicum (YTM 555) tugboat
    - Fire-class fireboat: CFAV Firebrand (YTR 562)
    - Ville-class tug: CFAV Lawrenceville (YTL 590), CFAV Parksville (YTL 591)
    - Glen-class tugboat: CFAV Glendyne (YTB 640), CFAV Glendale (YTB 641)
    - HMCS Oriole, sail training vessel
  - Fleet Diving Unit (Pacific)
  - Canadian Forces Fleet School Esquimalt
  - Meteorological and Oceanographic Centre Esquimalt
  - Queen's Harbour Master Esquimalt
  - HMCS Venture, the Naval Officers Training Centre
  - Fleet Maintenance Group Pacific
    - Canadian Forces Ship Repair Unit (Pacific)
    - Naval Engineering Unit (Pacific), CFB Esquimalt

==== Naval Reserve ====
The Naval Reserve consisted of 22 divisions in cities across Canada. In times of war the missions of naval reserve were the naval control of shipping, maritime coastal defence, and the clearance of mines.

- Maritime Command, at CFB Halifax
  - Naval Reserve, at CFB Halifax
    - HMCS Brunswicker, in Saint John
    - HMCS Cabot, in St. John's
    - HMCS Carleton, in Ottawa
    - HMCS Cataraqui, in Kingston
    - HMCS Champlain, in Saguenay
    - HMCS Chippawa, in Winnipeg
    - HMCS d'Iberville, in Rimouski
    - HMCS Discovery, in Vancouver
    - HMCS Donnacona, in Montreal
    - HMCS Griffon, in Thunder Bay
    - HMCS Hunter, in Windsor
    - HMCS Jolliet, in Sept-Îles, QuebecSept-Îles
    - HMCS Malahat, in Victoria, British Columbia
    - HMCS Montcalm, in Quebec City
    - HMCS Nonsuch, in Edmonton
    - HMCS Queen, in Regina
    - HMCS Radisson, in Trois-Rivières
    - HMCS Scotian, in Halifax
    - HMCS Star, in Hamilton
    - HMCS Tecumseh, in Calgary
    - HMCS Unicorn, in Saskatoon
    - HMCS York, in Toronto (activated 1989)

== Canadian Forces Europe ==
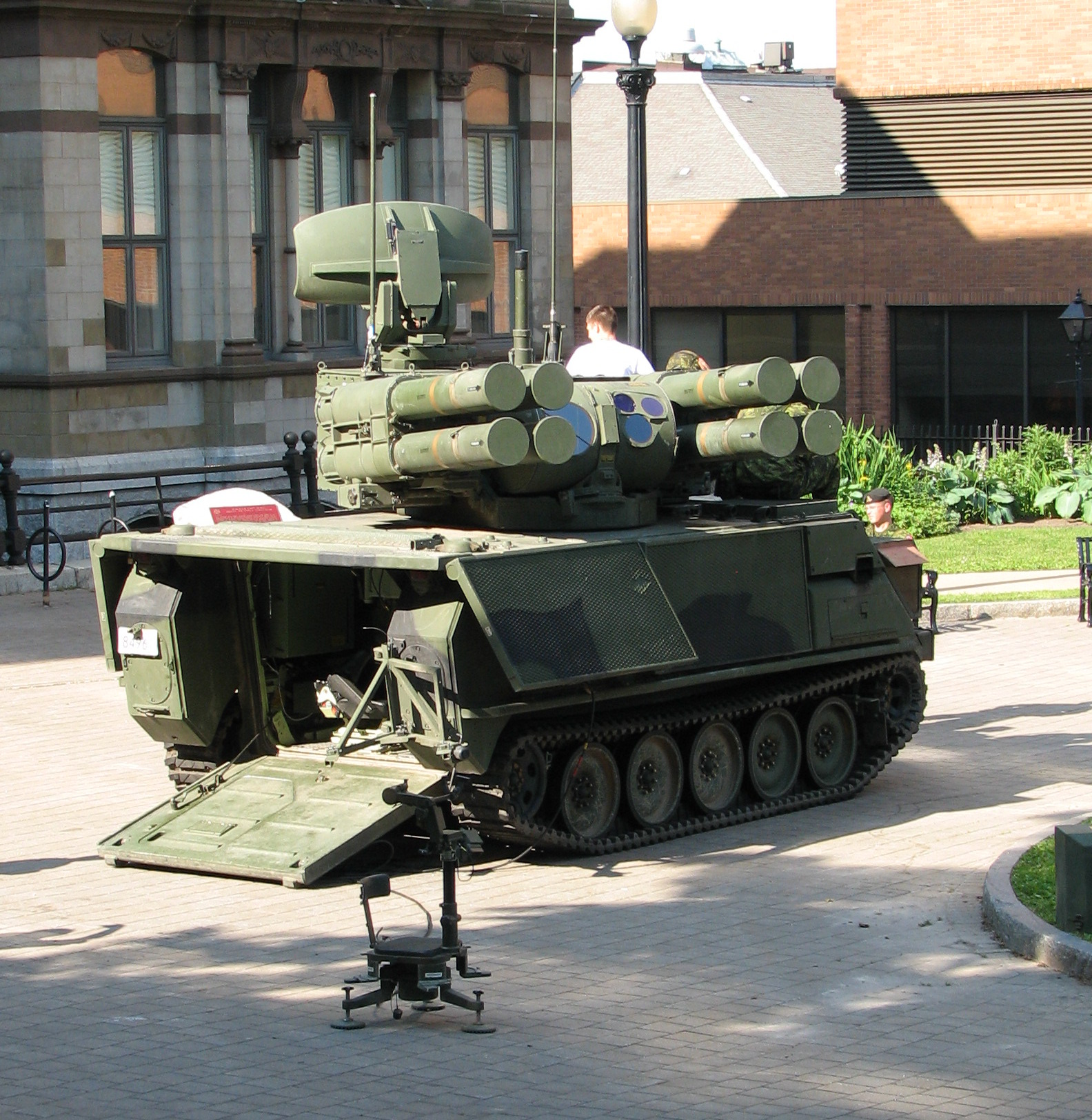
An ADATS of 4 Air Defence Regiment, RCA.

- Headquarters, Canadian Forces Europe (CFE), Canadian Forces Base Lahr, FRG
  - Canadian Forces Element, HQ CENTAG, in Heidelberg
  - Canadian Forces Element, HQ 4 ATAF, at Ramstein Air Base
  - Canadian Forces Element, HQ AMF (L), in Mannheim
  - Canadian Forces Element, NATO Airborne Early Warning Force, E-3A Component, at Geilenkirchen Air Base
  - National Support Unit, at Geilenkirchen Air Base
  - Communications Group Europe, CFB Lahr
    - Communications Squadron Lahr
    - Communications Squadron Baden-Söllingen
  - Canadian Forces Network, CFB Lahr
  - Canadian Forces Hospital Europe, CFB Lahr
  - CFB Lahr
  - CFB Baden-Söllingen
  - 311 Forward Mobile Support Unit, providing general logistic support to CFE
    - Forward Storage Site for units that would have been dispatched to Germany in case of war in Zimmern ob Rottweil
  - Ammunition Depot Lahr
  - Ammunition Depot Söllingen
  - Training Area Langenhard
  - 4 Air Defence Regiment, Royal Regiment of Canadian Artillery
    - Headquarters & Service Battery, 4 Air Defence Regiment, RCA (2x M 577, 2x M113)
    - 127 Air Defence Battery (detached to 4 Canadian Mechanized Brigade Group), CFB Lahr (12x ADATS, 15x Javelin, 5x M113)
    - 128 Air Defence Battery (detached to 4 Wing), CFB Baden-Söllingen (4x ADATS, 8x 35 mm Skyguard)
    - 129 Air Defence Battery (detached to 3 Wing), CFB Lahr (4x ADATS, 8x 35 mm Skyguard)
    - 4 Air Defence Workshop

=== 1 Canadian Division ===
- 1 Canadian Division (Forward), CFB Lahr, in war under CENTAG
  - 1st Canadian Division Headquarters and Signal Regiment (Forward), at CFB Lahr
  - 1st Canadian Division Intelligence Company, at CFB Lahr
  - 4 Canadian Mechanized Brigade Group, T CFB Lahr
    - 4 CMBG Headquarters & Signal Squadron, at CFB Lahr
    - 8th Canadian Hussars (Princess Louise's), at CFB Lahr (77x Leopard C1, 23x Lynx, 36x M113, 2x M577, 6x Bergepanzer)
    - 1^{er} Btn, Royal 22^{e} Régiment, at CFB Lahr (2x M577, 65x M113, 11x Lynx, 18x M113 TUA with TOW, 24x M125 with an 81 mm mortar)
    - 3rd Btn, Royal Canadian Regiment, at CFB Baden-Söllingen (2x M577, 65x M113, 11x Lynx, 18x M113 TUA with TOW, 24x M125 with an 81 mm mortar)
    - 1st Regiment, Royal Canadian Horse Artillery, at CFB Lahr (2x M577, 26x M109A4, 46x M113, 24x M548)
    - 4 Combat Engineer Regiment, at CFB Lahr (14x M113, 2x M577, 6x M548, 9x Badger AEV, 6x Biber bridgelayer)
    - 4 Service Battalion, at CFB Lahr (4x M113, 2x Bergepanzer, 6x MTV-R)
    - 4 Field Ambulance, at CFB Lahr
    - 4 Military Police Platoon, at CFB Lahr

In case of war 1 Canadian Division would have been reinforced by 5 Groupe-brigade mécanisé du Canada from CFB Valcartier, while 4 Canadian Mechanized Brigade Group would have been augmented with personnel from 1 Canadian Mechanized Brigade Group.

=== 1 Canadian Air Division ===
- 1 Canadian Air Division, CFB Baden-Söllingen, in war under Fourth Allied Tactical Air Force
  - 3 Wing CFB Lahr
    - 3 Wing Operations
    - 3 Communication and Air Traffic Control Squadron
  - 4 Wing CFB Baden-Söllingen
    - 4 Wing Operations
    - 4 Communication and Air Traffic Control Squadron
    - 409 Tactical Fighter Squadron, CF-18 Hornet
    - 421 Tactical Fighter Squadron, CF-18 Hornet
    - 439 Tactical Fighter Squadron, CF-18 Hornet
    - Air Reserve Augmentation Flight (Reserve Pilots)
    - Training Flight, 5x CT-133 Silver Star
    - 1 Air Maintenance Squadron CFB Baden-Soellingen
    - 4 Construction Engineer Squadron, detached from Royal Canadian Engineers
  - 444 Tactical Helicopter Squadron CFB Lahr, CH-135 Twin Huey, CH-136 Kiowa part of 10 Tactical Air Group and supporting 4 Canadian Mechanized Brigade Group
  - Detachment Lahr, 412 Transport Squadron from CFB Ottawa, 2x CC-142 Dash 8
    - 5 Air Movements Unit

In case of war 3 Wing would have been reinforced by two CF-18 Hornet squadrons based in Canada:

- 416 Tactical Fighter Squadron or 441 Tactical Fighter Squadron from CFB Cold Lake
- 425 Tactical Fighter Squadron or 433 Tactical Fighter Squadron from CFB Bagotville

== Communication Command ==
Canadian Forces Communication Command provided strategic communications for all services of the armed forces. It operated and maintained several data and voice communication networks. With an active force of 3,300 troops and 1,570 reservists Communication Command was the smallest of the armed forces commands.

Communication Command provided signal squadrons to the three brigades and Special Service Force of Mobile Command, as well signal support for Air Command bases. It also operated the Canadian contribution to the Five Eyes ECHELON signals intelligence network. However the Communications Security Establishment, which analysed intercepted material, was not part of Communication Command. The Canadian Government's Emergency Government Headquarters were also managed by Communication Command. Communication reserve units were grouped in six regional communication groups, which also contained active units based in the same region.

=== Communication Command Structure ===
- Communication Command
  - Canadian Forces School of Communications and Electronics, at CFB Kingston
  - Canadian Forces Data Centre, at CFB Borden
  - Canadian Forces Data Centre, at CFB Ottawa
  - Communications Group Europe, at CFB Lahr, supporting Canadian Forces Europe
    - Communications Squadron Lahr
    - Communications Squadron Baden-Söllingen
  - 1st Canadian Division Headquarters and Signal Regiment (Main), supporting 1st Canadian Division
  - 1 CMBG Headquarters & Signal Squadron, at CFB Calgary, supporting 1 Canadian Mechanized Brigade Group
  - 4 CMBG Headquarters & Signal Squadron, at CFB Lahr, supporting 4 Canadian Mechanized Brigade Group
  - 5 CMBG Headquarters & Signal Squadron, at CFB Valcartier, supporting 5 Canadian Mechanized Brigade Group
  - Special Service Force Headquarters & Signal Squadron, at CFB Valcartier, supporting Special Service Force
  - CFS Carp (Emergency Government Headquarters)
    - CFS Carp Almonte Detachment
    - CFS Carp Dunrobin Detachment
    - CFS Carp Richardson Detachment
  - 70 Communication Group, at CFB Toronto
    - 701 Communication Squadron, at CFS Carp
    - 702 Communication Squadron, at CFB Petawawa
    - 704 Communication Squadron, at CFB Rockcliffe
    - 706 Communication Squadron, at CFB Borden
      - Detachment CFB Toronto
      - Detachment CFB London
    - 707 Communication Squadron, at CFB North Bay
    - 708 Communication Squadron, at CFB Trenton
      - Detachment CFB Kingston
  - 71^{e} Groupe des communications, at CFB Montreal
    - 711 Escadron des communications, at CFB Valcartier
      - Détachement CFB Bagotville
      - Détachement CFS Moisie
      - Détachement CFS Mont Apica
    - 715 Escadron des communications, at CFB Saint-Jean
      - Détachement CFS Frobisher Bay
  - 72 Communication Group, at CFB Halifax
    - 720 Communication Squadron, at CFS Debert
      - Detachment CFB Chatham
      - Detachment CFB Summerside
    - 724 Communication Squadron, at CFB Gagetown
      - Detachment CFB Moncton
    - 726 Communication Squadron, at CFB Halifax
      - Detachment CFS Barrington
      - Detachment CFB Cornwallis
      - Detachment CFB Greenwood
      - Detachment CFB Shearwater
      - Detachment CFS Sydney
    - 727 Communication Squadron, at CFB St. John's
      - Detachment CFB Gander
      - Detachment CFB Goose Bay
  - 73 Communication Group, at CFB Winnipeg
    - 731 Communication Squadron, at CFB Shilo
      - Detachment Regina
      - Detachment CFB Moose Jaw
    - 733 Communication Squadron, at CFB Winnipeg
      - Detachment CFS Churchill
      - Detachment CFS Gypsumville
  - 74 Communication Group, in Vancouver
    - 740 Communication Squadron, at CFB Esquimalt
      - Detachment CFB Comox
      - Detachment CFB Chilliwack
      - Detachment CFS Holberg
    - 742 Communication Squadron, at CFB Edmonton
      - Detachment CFB Cold Lake
      - Detachment CFB Wainwright
      - Detachment CFS Yellowknife
      - Detachment CFS Whitehorse
    - 743 Communication Squadron, at CFB Penhold
      - Detachment CFB Suffield
      - Detachment CFB Calgary
    - 747 Communication Squadron
  - 76 Communication Group, in Ottawa
    - 764 Communication Squadron, at CFB Ottawa
    - Canadian Forces Cryptographic Maintenance Unit
    - Canadian National Distributing Authority
    - 1 Line Troop

==== Supplementary Radio System ====
- Supplementary Radio System, at CFB Kingston (Canadian contribution to the Five Eyes ECHELON SIGINT network)
  - 2 Electronic Warfare Squadron, at CFB Kingston
  - 770 Communication Research Squadron, at CFB Gander
  - 771 Communication Research Squadron, at CFB Ottawa
  - CFS Alert
  - CFS Bermuda
  - CFS Leitrim
  - CFS Masset
  - Detachment at Fort George G. Meade
  - Detachment at Field Station Augsburg
  - NRS Matsqui (MARPAC support element)
  - NRS Aldergrove (MARPAC support element)
  - NRS Newport Corner (MARLANT support element)
  - NRS Mill Cove (MARLANT support element)
  - CFB Winnipeg (AIRCOM support element)

==== Reserve Communication Units ====
- Canadian Forces Communication Command
  - 70 Communication Group, at CFB Toronto
    - 700 Communication Squadron, at CFB Borden
    - 705 Communication Squadron, in Hamilton
    - 709 Communication Regiment, in Toronto
    - 772 Electronic Warfare Squadron, at CFB Kingston (Twinned with 2 Electronic Warfare Squadron)
  - 71^{e} Groupe des communications, at CFB Montreal
    - 712 Escadron des communications, in Montreal
    - 713^{e} Régiment des communications, in Beauport
    - 714 Escadron des communications, in Sherbrooke
  - 72 Communication Group, at CFB Halifax
    - 721 Communication Regiment, in Charlottetown
      - Platoon-sized detachment in Glace Bay (former 725 Communication Squadron)
    - 722 Communication Squadron, in Saint John
    - 723 Communication Squadron, in Halifax
    - 728 Communication Squadron, in St. John's
  - 73 Communication Group, at CFB Winnipeg
    - 734 Communication Squadron, in Regina
    - 735 Communication Regiment, in Winnipeg
    - 736 Communication Squadron, in Thunder Bay
    - 737 Communication Troop, in Saskatoon
  - 74 Communication Group, in Vancouver
    - 741 Communication Squadron, in Victoria
    - 744 Communication Regiment, in Vancouver
    - 745 Communication Squadron, in Edmonton
    - 746 Communication Squadron, in Calgary
    - 748 Communication Troop, in Nanaimo
    - 749 Communication Troop, in Red Deer, Alberta
  - 76 Communication Group, in Ottawa
    - 763 Communication Regiment, in Ottawa
    - 765 Communication Squadron, in Ottawa

== Canadian Forces Medical Service and Canadian Forces Dental Service ==
The Canadian Forces Hospital and Medical Supply System was formed in 1989 to command fourth line medical units in Canada. This was an unallocated formation commanded by the VCDS with the Surgeon General serving as Deputy Commander of the formation. Other units of the Canadian Forces Medical Service, and the Canadian Forces Dental Service at the end of the Cold War were commanded by their respective operational formations (Canadian Forces Bases, Canadian Forces Europe, Land Forces brigades, and the Canadian Forces Training System).

- Canadian Forces Hospital and Medical Supply System
  - National Defence Medical Centre, in Ottawa
  - Canadian Forces Hospital Cold Lake, at CFB Cold Lake
  - Canadian Forces Hospital Halifax, at CFB Halifax
  - Canadian Forces Hospital Oromocto, at CFB Gagetown
  - Hôpital des Forces canadiennes Valcartier, at CFB Valcartier
  - Central Medical Equipment Depot, at CFB Petawawa
  - Regional Medical Equipment Depot, at CFB Borden
  - Regional Medical Equipment Depot, at CFB Calgary
  - Regional Medical Equipment Depot, at CFB Chilliwack
  - Regional Medical Equipment Depot, at CFS Debert
  - Dépôt régional de matériel médical, at CFB Valcartier
- Canadian Forces Medical Service
  - Canadian Forces Medical Services School, at CFB Borden
  - Canadian Forces Dental Services School, at CFB Borden
  - Canadian Forces School of Operational Medicine, in Toronto
  - Canadian Forces Hospital Europe, CFB Lahr, part of Canadian Forces Europe
  - 1 Canadian Field Hospital, at CFB Petawawa
  - 1 Field Ambulance, at CFB Calgary, supporting 1 Canadian Mechanized Brigade Group
  - 2 Field Ambulance, at CFB Petawawa, supporting Special Service Force
  - 4 Field Ambulance, at CFB Lahr, supporting 4 Canadian Mechanized Brigade Group
  - 5 Field Ambulance, at CFB Valcartier, supporting 5 Canadian Mechanized Brigade Group
- Canadian Forces Dental Service
  - 1 Dental Unit, at CFB Ottawa providing dental care for units in the National Capital Region
  - 11 Dental Unit, at CFB Esquimalt providing dental care for Maritime Forces Pacific units
  - 12 Dental Unit, at CFB Halifax providing dental care for Maritime Command units
  - 13 Dental Unit, at CFB Trenton providing dental care for Canadian Forces Training System units
  - 14 Dental Unit, at CFB Winnipeg providing dental care for Air Command units
  - 15 Dental Unit, at CFB St. Hubert providing dental care for Mobile Command units
  - 35 Dental Unit, at CFB Lahr providing dental care for Canadian Forces Europe units

=== Reserve Medical Units ===
- Canadian Forces Medical Service
  - 11 Medical Company, in Victoria
  - 12 Medical Company, in Vancouver
  - 15 Medical Company, in Edmonton (with a detachment in Calgary)
  - 16 Medical Company, in Regina
  - 17 Medical Company, in Winnipeg
  - 18 Medical Company, in Thunder Bay
  - 23 Medical Company, in Hamilton (detachments in London and Windsor)
  - 25 Medical Company, in Toronto
  - 26 Medical Company, in
  - 28 Medical Company, in Ottawa (with a detachment in North Bay)
  - 35 Medical Company, in Sydney (with detachments in Halifax, Saint John and St. John's)
  - 51 Compagnie médicale, in Montreal
  - 52 Compagnie médicale, in Sherbrooke
  - 55 Compagnie médicale, in Quebec City

== Canadian Forces Training System ==
The Canadian Forces Training System provided individual training for the operational commands. It operated 18 schools on five training bases and three schools on other commands' bases. Its strength was around 4,500 active members, 2,400 of which were instructors. Another 500 military instructors from other commands served as incremental staff. The training system was under the jurisdiction of the Assistant Deputy Minister (Personnel), whose mandate also included the National Defence College, the Military Colleges and the Staff Colleges. The Canadian forces also provided training facilities for allied nations.

- Canadian Forces Training System
  - CFB Toronto (Air Command Base)
    - Canadian Forces College
  - CFB Kingston
    - Royal Military College of Canada
    - Canadian Forces School of Communications and Electronics
    - Canadian Forces School of Intelligence and Security
  - CFB Chilliwack
    - Canadian Forces School of Military Engineering
    - Canadian Forces Officer Candidate School
  - CFB Borden
    - Canadian Forces School of Administration and Logistics
    - Canadian Forces School of Aerospace and Ordinance Engineering
    - Canadian Forces School of Aerospace Technology and Engineering
    - Canadian Forces School of Electrical and Mechanical Engineering
    - Canadian Forces Fire Academy
    - Canadian Forces Military Police Academy
    - Canadian Forces Nuclear, Biological and Chemical School
    - Canadian Forces School of Music
    - Canadian Forces School of Physical Education and Recreation
    - Canadian Forces Language School (Borden)
    - Canadian Forces Training Development Centre
  - CFB St. Jean
    - Collège militaire royal de St. Jean
    - École des récrues des Forces canadiennes (Canadian Forces Recruit School (St. Jean))
    - École de language des Forces canadiennes (St. Jean) (Canadian Forces Language School (St. Jean))
    - École de perfectionnement en gestion des Forces canadiennes (Canadian Forces Management Development School )
    - École technique des Forces canadiennes (Canadian Forces Technical School)
  - CFB Cornwallis
    - Canadian Forces Recruit School (Cornwallis)
  - CFB Penhold (Air Command Base)
    - Canadian Forces Leadership Academy
  - CFB Ottawa (Air Command Base)
    - Canadian Forces Language School (Ottawa)
    - School of Military Mapping
  - Canadian Forces Training Material Production Centre, at CFB Winnipeg

== Land equipment and aircraft totals ==
=== Equipment of Mobile Command ===
In 1989 Mobile Command fielded the following equipment:

- 114x Leopard C1 main battle tanks (77x deployed to Germany)
- 966x M113 armoured personnel carriers and variants (349x deployed to Germany)
- 195x Cougar reconnaissance and fire support vehicles
- 274x Grizzly wheeled armoured personnel carriers
- 172x Lynx reconnaissance vehicles (60x deployed to Germany)
- 233x 105mm towed howitzers (C1 howitzers and M 56 howitzers) (10x forward deployed to Germany for Canada's contribution to AMF(L))
- 76x M109A4 self-propelled howitzers (26x deployed to Germany)
- 149x BGM-71 TOW launchers (44x deployed to Germany)

=== Air Command Inventory ===
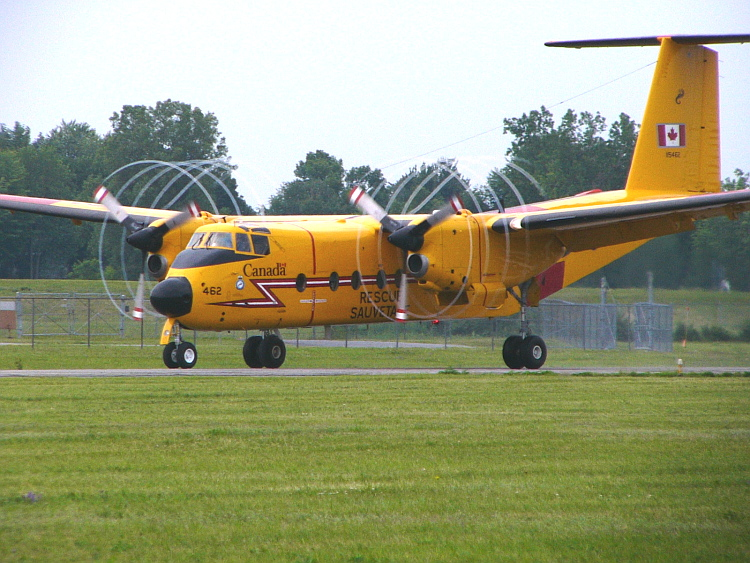
A taxing CC-115 Buffalo.

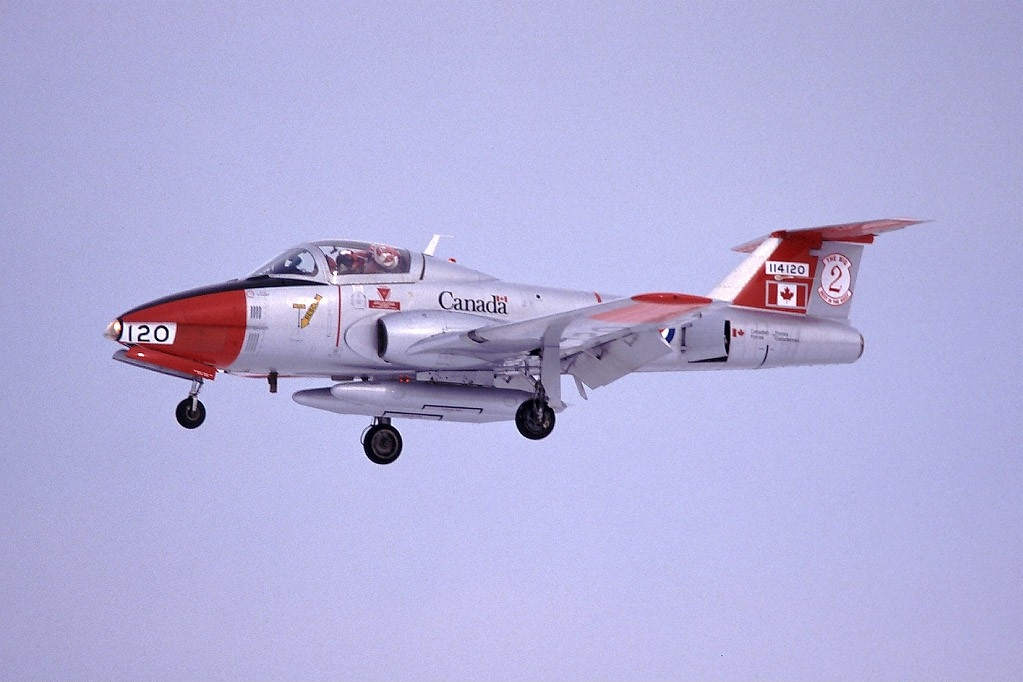
A CT-114 Tutor on landing approach.

The inventory of the Air Command in 1989 consisted of the following aircraft:

- Fighters:
  - 92x CF-18 Hornet
  - 39x CF-18B Hornet
  - 81x CF-5A/D Freedom Fighter, (Some stored)
- Maritime Patrol:
  - 18x CP-140 Aurora
  - CP-140A Arcturus, (3x on order)
  - 18x CP-121 Tracker, (Retired in 1990 after the introduction of the CP-140A Arcturus)
  - 32x/2x CH-124A/U Sea King
- Transport/Tanker Aircraft:
  - 5x CC-137 Husky, (Only two could be equipped as aerial refueling tanker at the same time)
- Transport Aircraft:
  - 20x/7x CC-130E/H Hercules
  - 16x CC-144 Challenger, (9x VIP, 1x Trials, 6x Electronic warfare)
  - 2x CT-142 Dash 8, (2 more delivered in 1989, 2 more in 1990/91, replacing the CC-129 Dakota)
  - 7x CC-109 Cosmopolitan
  - 7x CC-117 Falcon, (Taken out of service on 19 November 1989)
- Tactical Transport Helicopters:
  - 61x CH-136 Kiowa
  - 44x CH-135 Twin Huey, (Some stored)
  - 7x CH-147 Chinook
- Search and Rescue Aircraft:
  - 14x CH-113 Labrador
  - 14x CC-115 Buffalo
  - 7x CC-138 Twin Otter
  - 9x CH-118 Iroquois
- Training Aircraft:
  - 118x Canadair CT-114 Tutor (Some stored)
  - 58x Canadair CT-133 Silver Star
  - 20x Beechcraft CT-134 Musketeer
  - 14x Bell CH-139 Jet Ranger
