= Special Service Force =

Brigade of the Canadian Army

The Special Service Force was a designation used by two army units: a World War II Canadian-American formation, and a Canadian Army formation from 1977 to 1995.

Motto: Osons (French for 'Let us dare')

== World War II: 1st Special Service Force ==
1st Special Service Force.patch

In 1942 a highly specialized joint Canadian-American force was created to undertake special operations in Europe. In order that 500 "all ranks" could be recruited without undue publicity being directed towards their future role, the 2nd Canadian Parachute battalion was raised at the same time as the 1st, coming into order on 10 July 1942. On 25 May 1943 it became the 1st Canadian Special Force Battalion, with its officers and men distributed with the Americans throughout the multi-national unit.

The 1st Special Service Force was trained in Helena, Montana before being deployed in the Aleutian Islands in 1943, where it had valuable training experience. By November it had gone into action in Italy, where it distinguished itself in the successful assaults on Monte Le Difensa and Monte La Remetanea. It also fought at Anzio and in the drive to Rome, where it was the first Allied formation to enter the city. The 1st Special Service Force then advanced as far as the Tiber before being deployed for the invasion of southern France, where it spearheaded the landing force. After seeing action on the Franco-Italian border, the joint force was disbanded and the Canadian element was separated. It, too, was disbanded in December 1944, having fought well, earning ten battle honours and been given the nickname "the Devil's Brigade".

== Post World War II: Canadian Army Special Service Force ==
In 1977, 2 Combat Group combined with the Canadian Airborne Regiment to form the Special Service Force, a formation of the Canadian Army. This latter-day Special Service Force represented a compromise between the general-purpose combat capabilities of a normal brigade and the strategic and tactical flexibility that derived from the lighter and more mobile capabilities of the Canadian Airborne Regiment. Its insignia was a winged sword with the word Osons (French for 'Let us dare').

The Force was a brigade-sized command with a strength of 3,500, created to provide a small, highly mobile, general-purpose force that could be inserted quickly into any national or international theatre of operations. To this end most units in the Force had a parachute sub-unit that would be used to support the Canadian Airborne Regiment as the Airborne Battle Group. All but one unit were located in Petawawa, Ontario (1st Battalion The Royal Canadian Regiment was based in London, Ontario). The 8th Canadian Hussars armoured regiment had three squadrons: A, B and D. A and B were equipped with Cougar armoured vehicles, while D Squadron, an armoured reconnaissance squadron, was equipped with Lynx vehicles (D Squadron eventually developed an airborne capability and a two-car Lynx patrol was airdropped in Goose Bay, Labrador, in January 1986 during Exercise Lightning Strike 86. In 1987, the 8th Canadian Hussars deployed to Canadian Forces Base Lahr in the former West Germany, while the Royal Canadian Dragoons replaced them in the Special Service Force at Petawawa after redeploying from Lahr. The 2nd Regiment, Royal Canadian Horse Artillery, had a parachute battery (E Battery) with 105 mm L5 Pack Howitzers and from 1991, an airborne air defence troop. 2 Combat Engineer Regiment provided an airborne engineer troop. Command and supporting elements of the SSF Headquarters and Signals Squadron were airborne, as were a platoon provided from 2 Field Ambulance and a Tactical Air Movements Section from 2 Service Battalion.

In keeping with the Total Force concept that evolved in the late 1980s a number of combat arms units of the Army Reserve were assigned operational taskings to provide subordinate units in order to augment the Special Service Force when required. These sub-units were provided by units from the Central Militia Area (later re-designated as Land Forces Central Area and later still as 4th Canadian Division). Units tasked included the Queen's Own Rifles, elements of the 2nd Field Engineer Regiment, and a composite battery of Royal Canadian Artillery militia units. The Special Service Force's readiness and deployability were never tested as a formation, but its units and soldiers served in operations both at home and around the world. They served in Cyprus, Somalia, the former Yugoslavia, Rwanda, Namibia and internally at the protests in Ipperwash and southeastern Ontario.

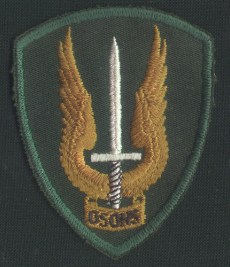
Special Service Force Brigade Patch, worn by Canadian soldiers in the Canadian Special Service Force.

With the addition of Leopard tanks for the RCD, M109 howitzers for 2 RCHA and the addition of the 2nd Battalion, the Royal Canadian Regiment, and the disbandment of the Canadian Airborne Regiment and the resulting reduction in the parachute capability, the Special Service Force was redesignated as 2 Canadian Mechanized Brigade Group (2 CMBG) by a ministerial order signed on 24 April 1995. This decision and the associated reorganizing and re-equipping of the formation are a reflection of the current emphasis in Canadian defence policy on general purpose capabilities. With a smaller force structure, a smaller defence budget and more frequent operational taskings, it became clear that general purpose capabilities provide the best return on investment in defence. Accordingly, 2 CMBG was designed to be a mirror image reflection of its two sister formations, 1 CMBG in Western Canada, and 5 CMBG in Quebec. In completing this transformation, 2 CMBG maintained the spirit and traditions of the Special Service Force, while mastering the equipment and tactical doctrine that give it wide employability in a range of possible taskings.

== See also ==
- Devil's Brigade
