= CFB Ottawa =

Canadian Forces Base in Ontario

Canadian Forces Base Ottawa (also CFB Ottawa) was a Canadian Forces Base located in Ottawa, Ontario.

CFB Ottawa was formed in 1972 to consolidate several Department of National Defence properties in the national capital region for administrative purposes.

The two largest components of CFB Ottawa were the former CFB Uplands and CFB Rockcliffe, which were referred to as CFB Ottawa (South) and CFB Ottawa (North) respectively.

Many residents of Ottawa continued to use the historic names of these geographically separate facilities. CFB Ottawa lost its status as a base during defence cutbacks in the mid-1990s.
