= Canadian Forces Language School =

Coordinates: 45.4236°N 75.6897°W

The Canadian Forces Language School (CFLS) is an institution of the Canadian Forces responsible for providing language education. The CFLS has its headquarters in Gatineau, Quebec, along with its National Capital Region Training Company, and detachments at Saint-Jean-sur-Richelieu, Quebec, and Borden, Ontario. Since 1993, CFLS Detachment Borden, located at Bldg P 153, has been teaching English as a Foreign Language to military officers from Central and Eastern European countries and Far East Countries. Currently, 17 European and 2 Far Eastern countries are represented at the school.

The course is sponsored by the Military Training Assistance Program, one of Canada's initiatives through the Partnership for Peace Programme. CFLS offers two 17-week and four 10-week courses annually. The objective is to provide foreign officers with a working ability in English, while acquainting them with the Canadian Forces and Canadian society. The officers, ranging from Second Lieutenants to Generals, have served or may serve on with NATO, the UN, or as military attachés.
