= Lynx reconnaissance vehicle =

Lynx
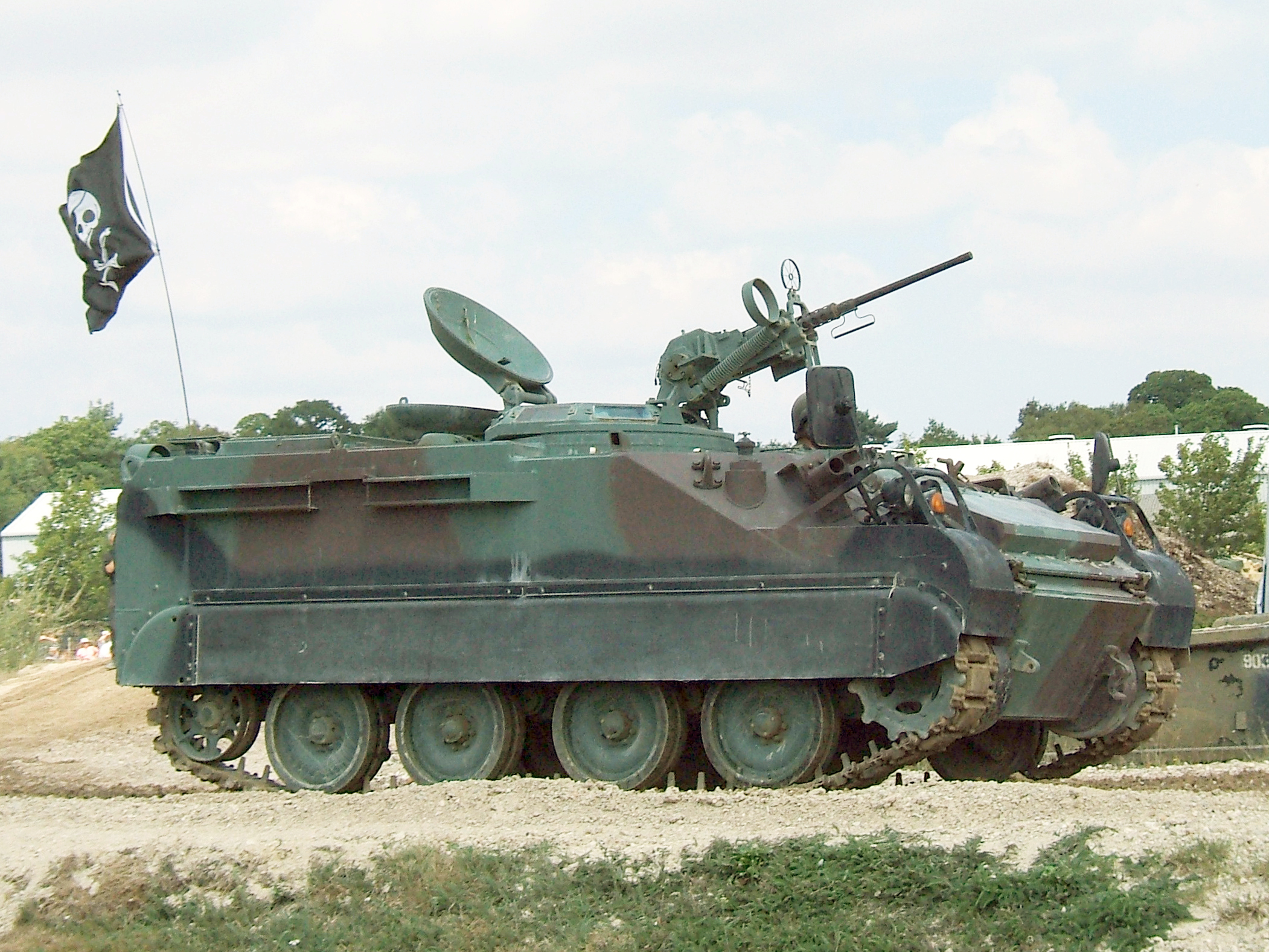
- Canadian Lynx taking part in Bovington Tank Museum's 'Tanks In Action' display
- Type: Reconnaissance armoured fighting vehicle
- Place of origin: United States

Service history
- Used by: Canada; Netherlands; Bahrain; Chile

Specifications
- Mass: 8.77 tonnes
- Length: 4.60 m
- Width: 2.41 m
- Height: 2.18 m
- Crew: 3 (commander, driver, observer)
- Armor: 31.8 mm
- Main armament: .50-caliber M2HB heavy machine gun
- Secondary armament: 7.62mm C5A1 (M1919) machine gun
- Engine: 6-cyl. diesel GMC Detroit Diesel 6V-53; 215 hp (160 kW)
- Power/weight: 25 hp/tonne
- Suspension: torsion-bar
- Operational range: 523 km
- Maximum speed: 71 km/h, 6 km/h swimming

The M113½ Command and Reconnaissance Vehicle (M113 C&R) is a United States-built tracked reconnaissance armoured fighting vehicle, which was originally employed by the armed forces of the Netherlands and Canada and later Bahrain and Chile. Former Dutch vehicles were exported in the 1990s to Bahrain and Chile after being retired from service.

The M113½ C&R was developed in 1963 as a private venture by FMC Corp., the manufacturer of the M113. It competed with the M114 but the US Army chose the M114 for production. The design was then offered to foreign buyers and gained the name Lynx Reconnaissance Vehicle when purchased by Canada and M113 C&V when purchased by the Netherlands.

The M113½ C&R was based on the M113, including its aluminum armor and many details of its construction. However, it is shorter in both length and height, and has four road wheels instead of five. This reduction in size led to a significant reduction in weight as well, dropping to about 8 tonne compared to over 12 for the original M113. The engine was moved to the rear and offered in gas and diesel versions.

The M113½ C&R is amphibious, propelled in the water by its tracks. Before swimming, a trim vane is erected at front, bilge pumps started, and covers mounted on the air intake and exhaust. In practice, crews would close hatches and ford shallow streams at high speed.

== Service history ==
=== Netherlands ===
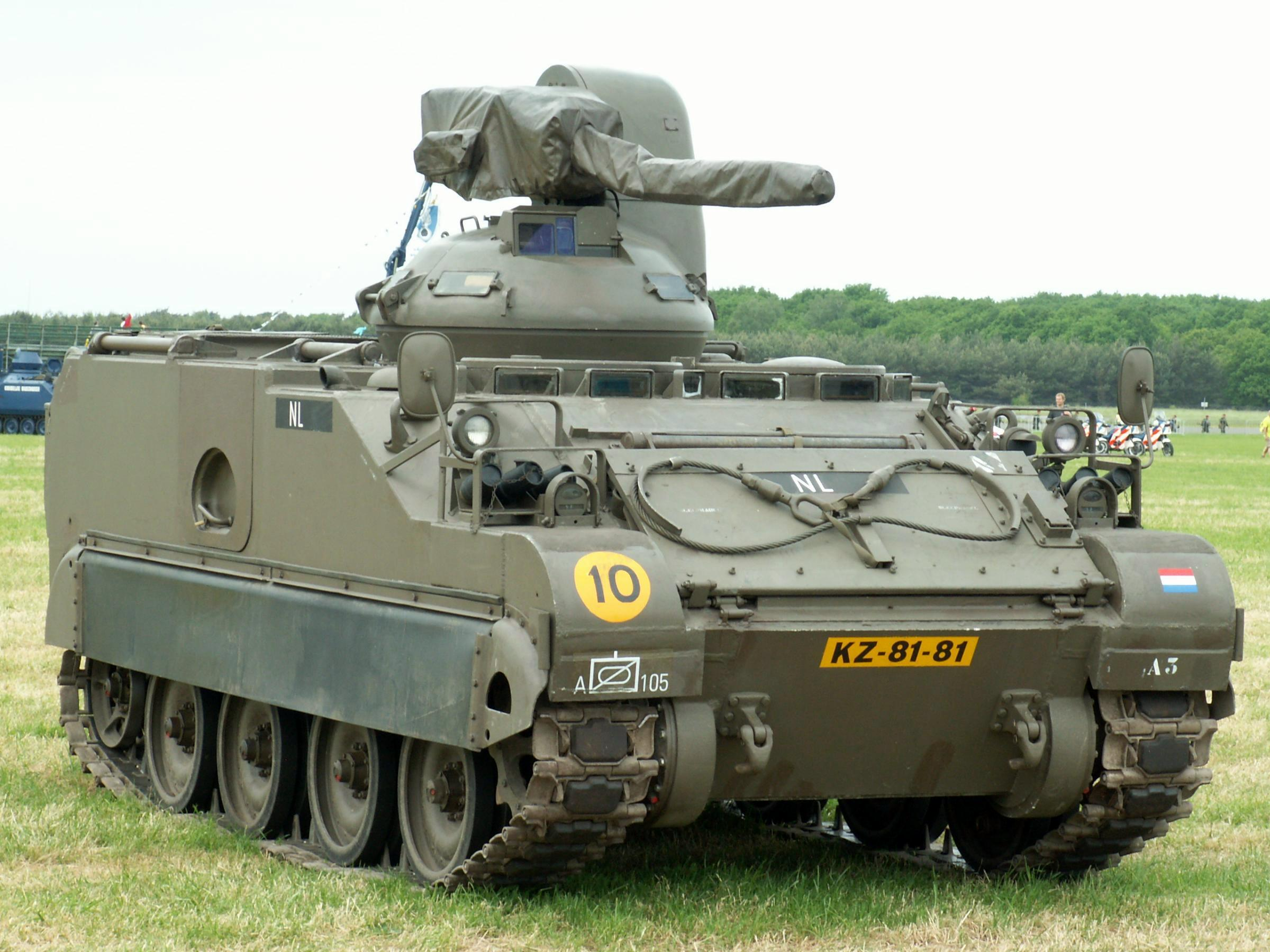
Dutch M113 C&V of A Sqn, 105th Recce Battalion

The Royal Netherlands Army accepted 266 vehicles, beginning in 1966 and designated them the M113 C&V (Commando & Verkenningen). The Dutch version of the M113 C&R has the driver seated to the front-left of the hull, the radio operator armed with a pintle mounted FN MAG machine gun seated to the front-right of the hull, and a vehicle commander armed with a cupola mounted M2HB .50-calibre machine gun in the centre of the hull. At the end of the 1960s a total of 16 vehicles were reassigned to the KMar with 250 vehicles remaining in Army use.

In 1974 all 266 vehicles were upgraded (Both Army and KMar), which saw the removal of the pintle mounted FN MAG and M2HB, with them being replaced by an Oerlikon-Bührle KUKA GBD-ADA turret armed with a Oerlikon KBA-B 25 mm autocannon and a coaxial FN MAG. Dutch Army and KMar vehicles were retired from service in the early 1990s and later exported to Bahrain and Chile (35 and 8 vehicles respectively).

=== Canada ===
The Canadian Forces accepted 174 vehicles from 1968 and designated them the Lynx Reconnaissance Vehicle. Lynx's were issued to the reconnaissance squadron of an armoured regiment (D Sqn), as well as to squadrons of the armoured regiment assigned to the reconnaissance role, with one squadron retaining the Ferret scout car. The squadron consisted of three troops, each equipped with five Lynxes, two two-vehicle patrols plus the troop leader's vehicle, four troops per squadron for the reconnaissance regiment. The Militia [reserves] armoured reconnaissance units trained for the role with the M38A1, M151A2 or Iltis 4×4 light utility vehicles. In addition, nine Lynxes equipped the reconnaissance platoon of an infantry battalion's combat support company, as well as the reconnaissance sections of combat engineer field troops.

In the Canadian Lynx, the crew commander's cupola is located middle-right, and the observer's hatch was rear-left. The commander operates the manually traversed and electro-optical fired M2HB .50-calibre machine gun fitted on the M26 cupola gun mount from inside the vehicle, but reloads it with the hatch open. The rear-facing observer operates the radio and fires the pintle-mounted C5A1 machine gun. Behind the commander, on the floor, was a drop-down escape hatch.

The Canadian Lynx was withdrawn from service in 1993, with the capability initially covered on an interim basis by M113A2s, and later fully replaced by 203 Coyote eight-wheeled reconnaissance vehicles by the end of 1996. A total of 84 scrapped vehicles were sold on to a private Dutch company and were later sold to Iran who then restored the vehicles for use in the Iranian Army.

== Operators ==
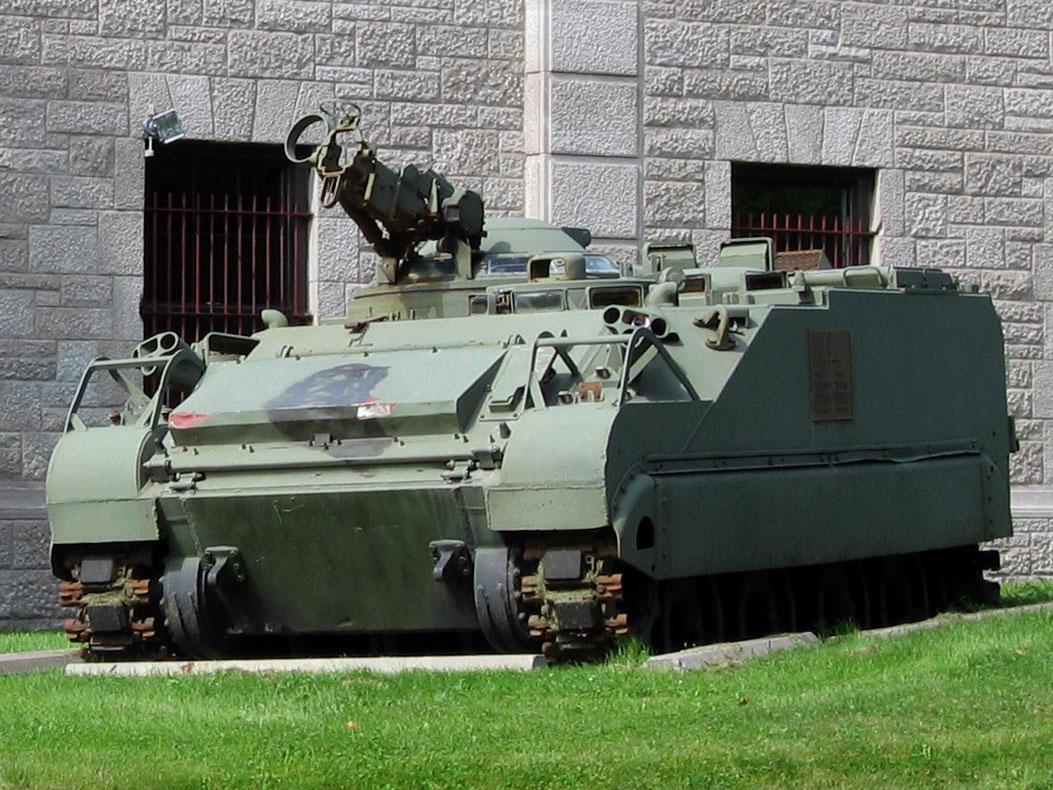
Lynx of the Royal Canadian Hussars, installed in front of the Côte-des-Neiges Armoury, Montreal

- Bahrain (M113 C&V): 35 Vehicles - Status Unknown, formerly Dutch vehicles
- Canada (Lynx): 174 Vehicles - Retired in 1993
- Chile (M113 C&V): 8 Vehicles - Retired, formerly Dutch vehicles
- Iran (Lynx): 84 Vehicles - Active, formerly Canadian vehicles
- Netherlands (M113 C&V): 266 Vehicles - Retired, phased out in the early 1990s
- United Kingdom (M113½ C&R): Tested Only
- United States (M113½ C&R and M113 C&V): Tested only

== Survivors ==
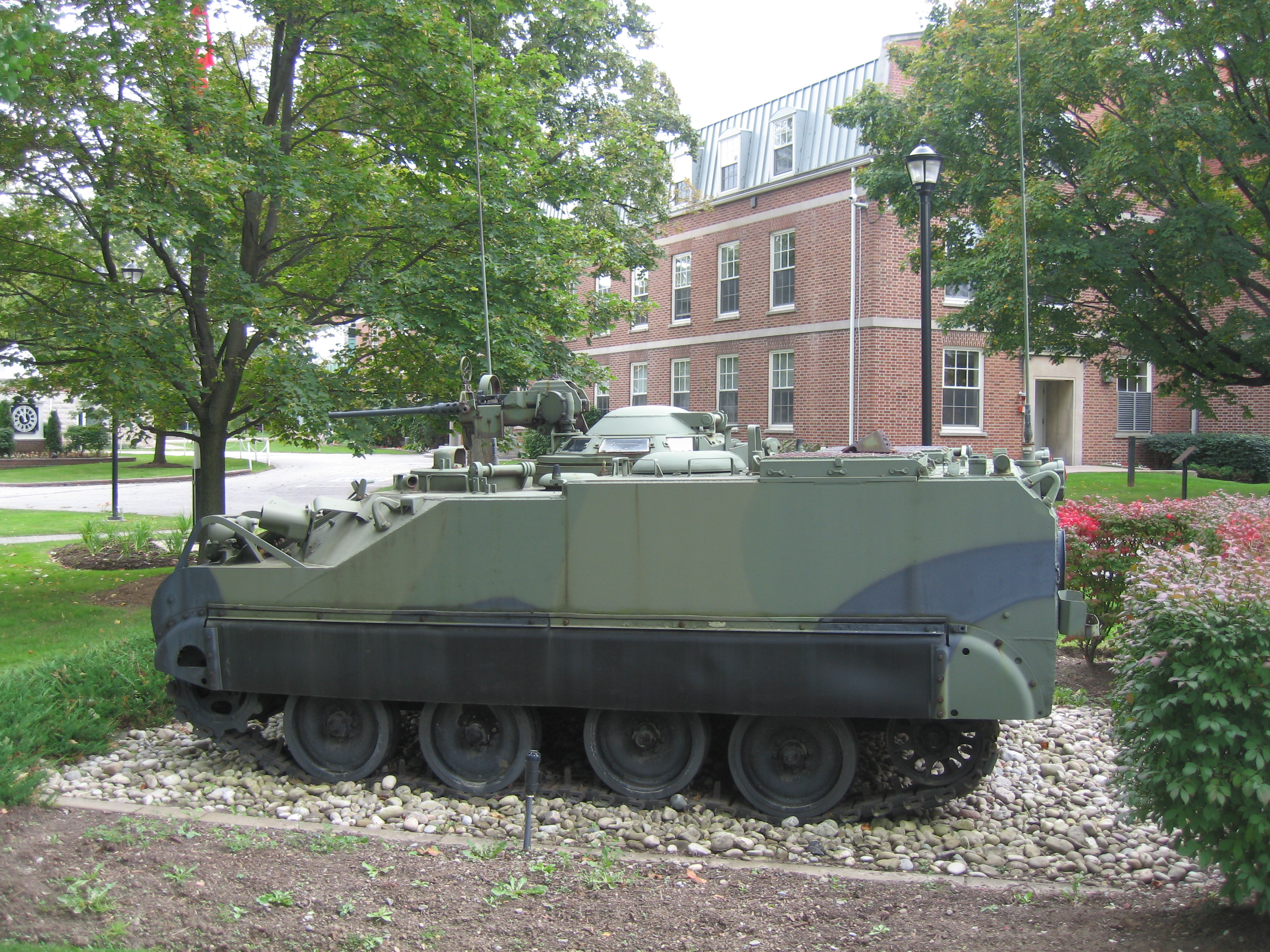
Canadian Forces College

Surviving vehicles include several monuments and museum pieces, and a few running vehicles. This list only includes the M113½ C&R prototypes and Canadian Lynx. It does not include surviving Dutch M113 C&Vs.

British Columbia

- J.R. Vicars Armoury, Kamloops, British Columbia
- British Columbia Dragoons Regimental Headquarters, (B Squadron) Kelowna, British Columbia
- Vernon Military Camp, Vernon, British Columbia (2 at this location, one in UN Colours)

Alberta

- CFB Edmonton, 1 Lynx on display at the Steele Barracks entrance

1 Lynx on display in 7 Canadian Forces Supply Depot memorial park.

- The Military Museums, Calgary, Alberta
- Royal Canadian Legion, Fort Saskatchewan, Alberta
- Evansburg Cenotaph, Evansburg, Alberta*

Saskatchewan

- LCol D.V. Currie VC Armoury, Moose Jaw, Saskatchewan (Saskatchewan Dragoons), has two Lynxes, in camouflage and UN peacekeeping colours

Manitoba

- McGregor Armoury, Winnipeg, Manitoba (Fort Garry Horse)
- CFB Shilo, One monument at main gate, second Lynx awaiting restoration to operable condition in RCA Museum.

Ontario

- Canadian Army 4th Division Training Center/Land Forces Central Area Training Center (LFCA TC) MEAFORD, Meaford, Ontario (Located at the main gate historic tank park)
- Cornwall Armoury, Cornwall, Ontario
- 31 Combat Engineer Regiment (The Elgins), St. Thomas Armoury, St. Thomas, Ontario
- CFB Petawawa, Worthington Barracks, Petawawa, Ontario
- Base Borden Military Museum, Borden, Ontario
- Canadian Forces College, Toronto, Ontario
- Wolseley Barracks, London, Ontario
- Denison Armoury, Toronto, Ontario. (in storage in training area next to DRDC)

Quebec

- CFB Valcartier, Valcartier, Quebec, in UN peacekeeping colours.
- Salaberry Armoury, Gatineau, Quebec (Régiment de Hull)
- Côte-des-Neiges Armoury, Montreal, Quebec (Royal Canadian Hussars)
- Les Fusiliers de Sherbrooke, Sherbrooke, Québec
- Les Fusiliers du St-Laurent, Rivière du loup, Québec

New Brunswick

- CFB Gagetown Military Museum, Oromocto, New Brunswick
- 8th Hussars Military Museum, Sussex, New Brunswick

Nova Scotia

- Fort Petrie Military Museum, New Victoria, Cape Breton Island, Nova Scotia

Prince Edward Island

- The Prince Edward Island Regiment has two on display in Summerside and Charlottetown

Newfoundland

- Gallipoli Armory, Corner Brook, Newfoundland & Labrador
- Royal Canadian Legion, Pasadena, Newfoundland

Northwest Territories

- Joint Task Force (North), Yellowknife, Northwest Territories, painted in UN peacekeeping markings

Europe

- Overloon War Museum, Overloon, the Netherlands
- Musée des Blindés, Saumur, France

Running Lynxes

- * CFB Borden Museum, Borden, Ontario maintains 1 operating Lynx that is used in Military funerals etc., it is on display in the museum)
- The British Columbia Regiment (Duke of Connaught's Own), Vancouver, BC, has one operational Lynx.
- Ontario Regiment museum in Oshawa, Ontario, maintains four fully operational Lynxes in its collection. Two are painted CF o/d green, one UN white, the other in CF winter camouflage.
- Lincoln & Welland Regimental Museum, St Catharines, Ontario, has one operational Lynx.
- Bovington Tank Museum, Dorset, England, has shown an operating Lynx.
- Lord Strathcona's Horse, Edmonton, Alberta, has a running Lynx in their Historical Vehicle Troop.
- The Canadian War Museum, Ottawa, Ontario, has a running Lynx.
- FAMAE, Fuerte baquedano, Chile, has a running Lynx
- Private Collector, Northeast USA; a running Lynx that has been shown at various shows across the US
- Private collector in the Calgary Alberta region

M113½ C&R Prototypes

- Panzerfabrik, Colorado, USA; an unrestored but running M113½ C&R prototype formerly of the Littlefield Collection. The vehicle is missing its turret
- American Armory Museum, California, USA; a restored M113½ C&R prototype SN #2 of 10 formally of the Littlefield Collection. The vehicle is unique in the way that the side hatch swings out from the side and not a "gull-wing" hatch of the production M113 C&V

== Bibliography ==
- "Armored Command and Reconnaissance Carrier". American Fighting Vehicle Database.
- "Lynx". The Bucket Shop. Archived from the original on 28 July 2006. (site gone; )
- "M113 "Lynx" Command and Reconnaissance Vehicle". Oshawa Military and Industrial Museum (Ontario Regiment RCAC Museum), Oshawa, Ontario. Archived from the original on 17 February 2007.
- "Canadian Lynx Command & Recon". AFV News. Archived from the original on 15 June 2006. – employment of the Lynx by the 8th Canadian Hussars in Cyprus, 1978–79
- Foss, Christopher F. (1987). Jane's AFV Recognition Handbook, pp 154–55. London: Jane's. ISBN 0-7106-0432-7.
- Sewards, Anthony (2007). "Lynx photo walk-around".
