= 1st Canadian Division =

Canadian Maneouvre Division based at CFB Edmonton, Alberta

1st Canadian Division; 1st Canadian Infantry Division
- 1^{re} Division du Canada
- 1st Canadian Infantry Division formation patch
- Active: 1914–1919; 1939–1945; 1954–1958; 1989–1999; 2010–present
- Country: Canada
- Branch: Canadian Expeditionary Force 1914–1919; Canadian Army 1939–1945, 1954–1958; Land Force Command 1989–1999, 2010–2011; Canadian Army 2011–2015; Canadian Joint Operations Command 2015–2026; Canadian Army 2026–present
- Type: Manoeuvre
- Size: Division
- Part of: Canadian Army
- Garrison/HQ: Edmonton
- Nickname: "The Old Red Patch"
- Mottos: Agile, Versatile, Ready
- Engagements: World War I: Second Battle of Ypres; Battle of the Somme; Battle of Vimy Ridge; Battle of Passchendaele; World War II: Allied invasion of Sicily; Battle of Ortona; Moro River campaign; Hitler Line; Battle of Rimini; Operation Chesterfield; Western Allied invasion of Germany; Liberation of Arnhem
- Website: www.canada.ca/en/department-national-defence/services/operations/military-operations/conduct/1-canadian-division.html

Commanders
- Current commander: MGen Wade Rutland
- Notable commanders: Edwin Alderson; Arthur Currie; Archibald Cameron Macdonell; Andrew McNaughton; George Pearkes; Harry Salmon; Guy Simonds; Chris Vokes; Harry Wickwire Foster; Roméo Dallaire; David Fraser

The 1st Canadian Division (French: 1^{re} Division du Canada) is the Canadian Army's manoeuvre division headquartered at CFB Edmonton. Largely a Regular Force formation, it is "the Canadian Army's primary force responsible for generating high-readiness, deployable combat power for large-scale combat operations and crisis response, both in Canada and abroad."

Formed during the First World War in August 1914, the 1st Canadian Division was a formation of the Canadian Expeditionary Force. The division contained a cavalry squadron and a cyclist company, three infantry brigades (the 1st, 2nd and 3rd Canadian Infantry Brigades, each of four battalions), representing all parts of Canada, three field artillery brigades (roughly equivalent to modern regiments) armed with 18-pounders and engineers, together with elements of the Army Service Corps and the Army Medical Corps. The total war establishment of the division was 17,873 all ranks, with 4,943 horses. During its service in the First World War, the division fought at Ypres, Festubert, the Somme, Vimy Ridge, Passchendaele and Amiens among other notable battles on the Western Front.

Following the war, the division was stood down, only to be re-mobilized as a formation on 1 September 1939 as the 1st Canadian Infantry Division for service in the Second World War. The division was part of the Allied campaign to invade Sicily, as well as their campaign on the Italian mainland, where they are associated with such notable battles as Ortona, the Liri Valley and the Gothic Line. The division reunited with the First Canadian Army in 1945 to participate in the liberation of the Western Netherlands before the end of the war in Europe.

The division was also reactivated twice during the Cold War: from 1953 to 1958, and again from 1988 to 1992.

In 2010, the division was reactivated for a third time. While the four divisions (2nd to 5th) of the Canadian Army were responsible for command of units within their respective geographic regions, the 1st Canadian Division Headquarters was formed to serve as a task-tailored, deployable joint headquarters at high readiness to command and control joint, inter-agency, multinational forces to achieve national objectives at home and abroad.

== First World War ==
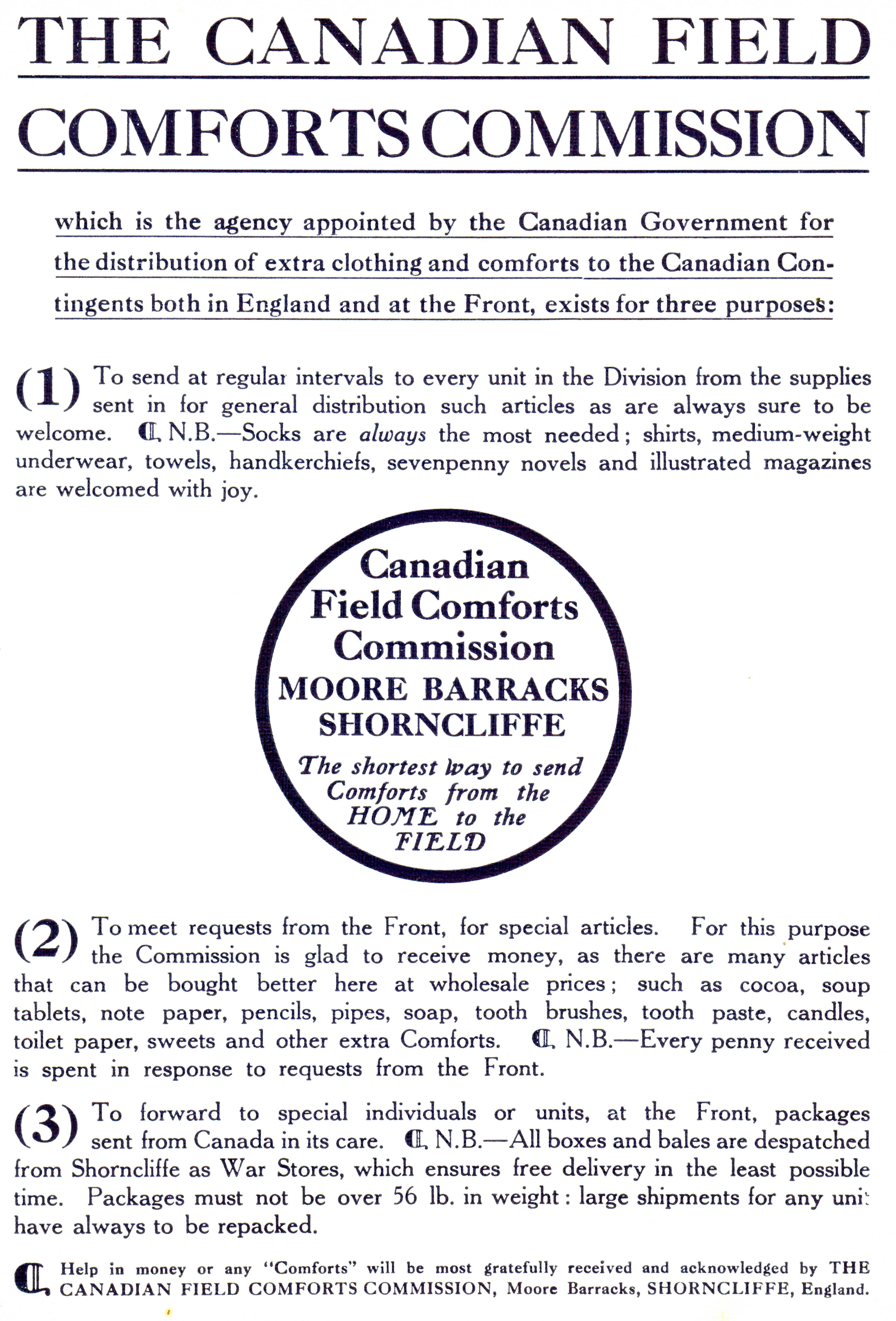
Canadian field comforts commission insert found in "With the First Canadian Contingent", Canadian Government publication from 1915.

The First Contingent of the Canadian Expeditionary Force was raised in August 1914, shortly after the outbreak of the Great War, concentrated at Valcartier Camp in Quebec, and set off for England in the largest trans-Atlantic convoy to date two months later. Training and reorganization commenced upon arrival in the United Kingdom in October 1914, and it was not until 26 January 1915 that the division was officially organized, under the command of Lieutenant-General Edwin Alderson, a British Army officer. Several units under command of the First Contingent were excluded from the divisional organization, including the 17th Battalion (Nova Scotia Highlanders), 18th Battalion, and several companies of Newfoundland soldiers (later formed into the Newfoundland Regiment and assigned to the 29th Division).

The division consisted originally of a cavalry squadron, cyclist company, four infantry brigades, three artillery brigades (equivalent in terms of numbers to the regiments used in the Second World War and after) armed with 18-pounders, and divisional engineers, with supporting troops of the Canadian Army Service Corps and Canadian Army Medical Corps. The strength of the division was placed at 17,873 all ranks, with 4,943 horses. The 4th Brigade was broken up in January 1915, with one battalion (the 10th) going to the 2nd Brigade, and the other three battalions being used to form the Canadian Training Depot, ultimately being re-designated as "Reserve" Battalions. The 10th Battalion replaced the 6th Battalion (Fort Garrys), which left the 2nd Brigade to become a cavalry unit, later serving in the Canadian Cavalry Brigade.

Pioneer units were added later in the war, including the 1st Canadian Pioneer Battalion from March 1916 to February 1917, when they became the 9th Canadian Railway Battalion. The 107th Canadian Pioneer Battalion also came under command between March 1917 and May 1918, before being absorbed by the 1st Canadian Engineer Brigade.

Lieutenant-General Alderson was selected and appointed in October 1914 to command the new Canadian Division, as it was known at that time, making him the highest ranking divisional commander in the British Army. He was selected — to the relief of many — in lieu of Sir Sam Hughes, who was promoted at this time by the prime minister to the rank of Major-General. It had been Hughes's wish to command the Canadians in action. Alderson, who had commanded Canadian units before, won out over three prospective Canadian appointees, who, while serving with the British Army, were still considered too inexperienced. Alderson, meanwhile, had first seen action against the Boers in 1881, and thereafter fought in Egypt, the Sudan (he served with a Camel Corps in the Nile Expedition of 1884–1885) and Mashonaland. He also served throughout the South African War of 1899–1902, in which he had Canadian mounted troops under his command.

Training in the winter of 1914 was rigorous, and conditions on Salisbury Plain were harsh due to cold and rain. Alderson rejected the "shoddy" kit that was supplied from Canada including the Ross Rifle which had been adopted due to the slow rate of supply of the Lee–Enfield and which was seen as an example of Canadian nationalism. A royal inspection of the division early in 1915 foretold a move to France.

Early in 1915, it was evident that the Canadians would soon be going to France. The division paraded in drill order for an inspection by His Majesty King George V; thereafter, units boarded troop ships at Avonmouth and during mid-February, the entire division crossed the rough Channel to St. Nazaire. After a brief period in reserve near Hazebrouck, the Canadians relieved the 7th British Division in the Fleurbaix sector near Armentières on 1–3 March. General Alderson then became responsible for 6,400 yards (5,900 m) of front line on the left flank of the First Army (General Sir Douglas Haig).

The division moved to the Ypres Salient in April, and faced its first real test during the defence of St. Julien beginning on 22 April. The Canadians withstood German attack — aided, for the first time on the Western Front, by the use of poison gas — and finally retired to secondary positions on 26 April, where they held on until 4 May. The Second Battle of Ypres, as the overall action came to be known, cost the infantry brigades some 5,506 men.

Two weeks later, the division was in action again at Festubert. Aiding in a diversionary offensive by the British armies, the Canadians suffered 2,204 casualties for gains of only 600 yards (550 m). Another futile attack was launched at Givenchy-en-Gohelle in June 1915, after which the division moved to Ploegsteert.

The Canadians began a long period of static warfare which would last them throughout the winter. In September, the arrival of the 2nd Canadian Division meant that a national corps headquarters could take to the field to command the division. Major-General Arthur Currie took command of the division in September. Active operations resumed again in the spring of 1916, participating in the Battle of Mount Sorrel, and then restoring the situation at Sanctuary Wood.

The Battle of the Somme opened on 1 July 1916, the costliest day in the history of the British Army, with over 19,000 British soldiers killed and 38,000 wounded. The Canadian part in the battle, which was to last through to November, did not begin until September at Battle of Pozières and lasted through to October. It was on the Somme that the red patch was first worn as an identifying device—two inches by three inches and worn on both sleeves, this rectangle identified the wearer as belonging to the 1st Division. The insignia was also painted on steel trench helmets, and adorned with geometric shapes of different colours to further identify the soldier's specific battery, brigade, battalion or other subunit.

The division began to prepare for the historic assault on Vimy Ridge, and took the time-honoured position of right of the line on 9 April 1917 when the corps took the ridge. Other gains were made in the days following the successful assault on the ridge, and the division participated in the battle of Hill 70 in August 1917. The Third Battle of Ypres (Passchendaele) followed in mid-October, and fighting continued into November. The division served under Major-General Archibald Cameron Macdonell beginning in May; his command persisted until Armistice Day.

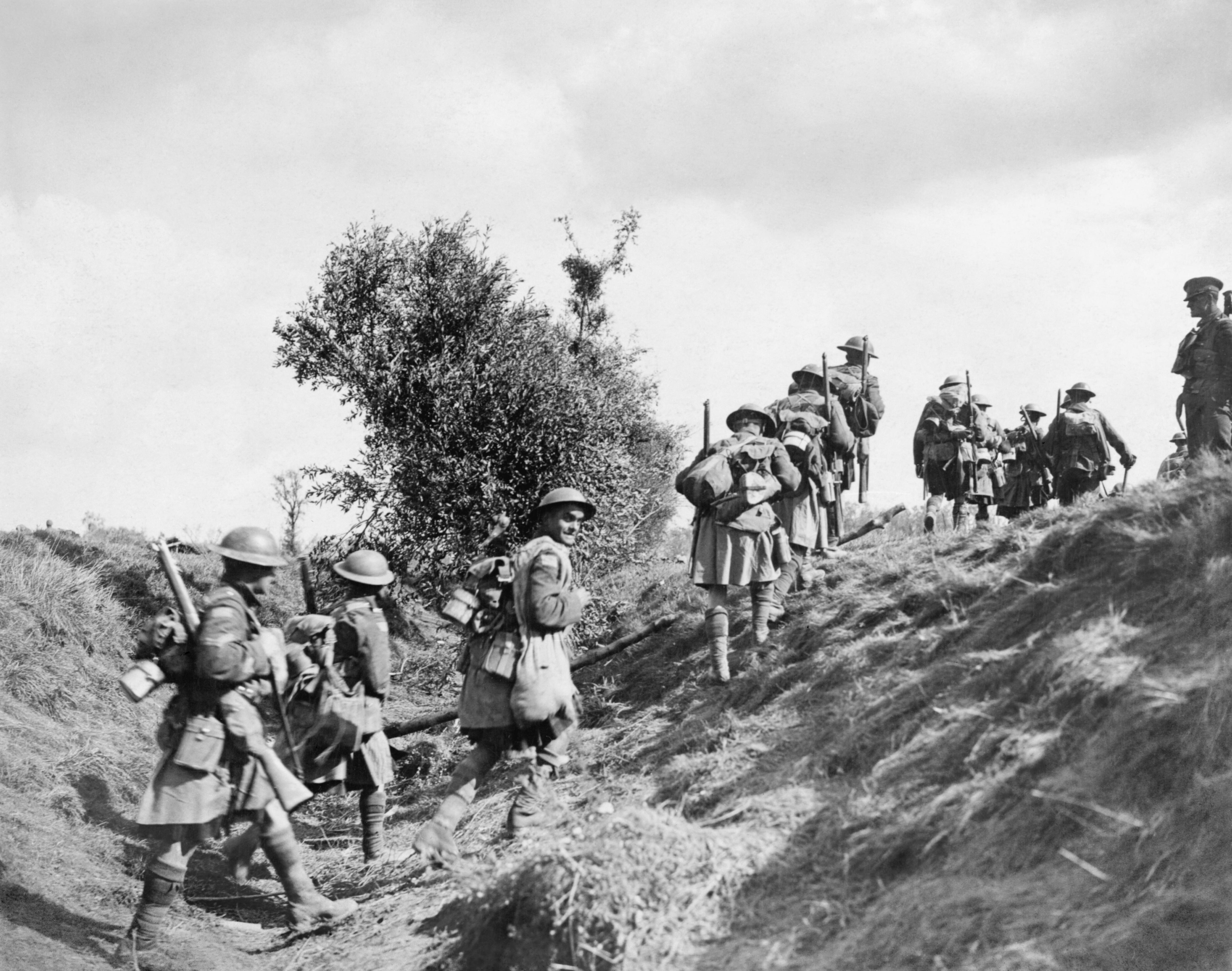
Men of the 16th Infantry Battalion (Canadian Scottish) moving up to the front line near Inchy during the Canadian Corps crossing of the Canal du Nord, 27 September 1918.

Massive German offensives came in the spring of 1918, but the Canadian Corps—now considered crack assault troops—were held in reserve for the inevitable counter-offensives. "Canada's Hundred Days"—the last 100 days of the war—were marked by several Canadian successes, at Amiens, Arras (which included the Drocourt-Quéant Line), Canal du Nord and the Pursuit to Mons. The armistice of 11 November 1918 finally brought the Great War to an end.

=== Order of battle (1914–1919) ===
Infantry units

1st Canadian Brigade:

- 1st Canadian Battalion (Ontario Regiment), CEF. August 1914 – 11 November 1918;
- 2nd Canadian Battalion (Eastern Ontario Regiment), CEF. August 1914 – 11 November 1918;
- 3rd Canadian Battalion (Toronto Regiment), CEF. August 1914 – 11 November 1918;
- 4th (Central Ontario) Battalion, CEF. August 1914 – 11 November 1918.

2nd Canadian Brigade:

- 5th Battalion (Western Cavalry), CEF. August 1914 – 11 November 1918;
- 6th Battalion (Fort Garrys), CEF. August 1914 – December 1914 (Became Canadian Cavalry Depot);
- 7th Canadian Battalion (1st British Columbia), CEF. August 1914 – 11 November 1918;
- 8th Canadian Infantry Battalion (90th Regiment), CEF. August 1914 – 11 November 1918;
- 10th Battalion (Canadians), CEF. January 1915 – 11 November 1918.

3rd Canadian Brigade:

- 13th Battalion (Royal Highlanders of Canada), CEF. August 1914 – 11 November 1918.
- 14th Battalion (Royal Montreal Regiment), CEF. August 1914 – 11 November 1918.
- 15th Battalion (48th Highlanders of Canada), CEF. August 1914 – 11 November 1918.
- 16th Canadian Battalion (The Canadian Scottish), CEF. August 1914 – 11 November 1918.

4th Canadian Brigade:

- The brigade was dispersed in January 1915.
- 9th Battalion, CEF. August 1914 – January 1915. To the Canadian Training Depot.
- 10th Battalion (Canadians), CEF. August 1914 – January 1915. To the 2nd Canadian Brigade.
- 11th Battalion, CEF. August 1914 – January 1915. To the Canadian Training Depot.
- 12th Battalion, CEF. August 1914 – January 1915. To the Canadian Training Depot.

Pioneers:

- 1st Canadian Pioneer Battalion. March 1916 – February 1917. Became the 9th Canadian Railway Battalion.
- 107th Canadian Pioneer Battalion. March 1917 – May 1918. Absorbed by the 1st Canadian Engineer Brigade.

Attached troops:

- 17th Battalion, CEF. August 1914 – January 1915. To the Canadian Training Depot.
- 18th Battalion Canadian Infantry. August 1914 – September 1914. Disbanded.
- Newfoundland Companies. October 1914 – December 1914. Left the division and was made up to battalion strength. The Newfoundland Regiment then joined the British 29th Division in September 1915.

=== Battles and engagements on the Western Front ===
| Year | Battle/engagement | Date(s) |
|---|---|---|
| 1915 | Second Battle of Ypres | |
| 1915 | Battle of Gravenstafel | 22–23 April |
| 1915 | Battle of Saint Julien: (see also Saint Julien Memorial) | 24 April – 4 May |
| 1915 | Battle of Festubert | 15–25 May |
| 1915 | Second Battle of Givenchy | 15–16 June |
| 1916 | Battle of Mount Sorrel | 2–13 June |
| 1916 | Battle of the Somme | |
| 1916 | Battle of Flers-Courcelette | 15–22 September |
| 1916 | Battle of Thiepval | 26–28 September |
| 1916 | Battle of Le Transloy | 1–18 October |
| 1916 | Battle of the Ancre Heights | 1 October – 11 November |
| 1917 | Battle of Vimy Ridge | 9–12 April |
| 1917 | Battle of Arleux | 28–29 April |
| 1917 | Third Battle of the Scarpe: (including the capture of Fresnoy) | 3–4 May |
| 1917 | Battle of Hill 70 | 15–25 August |
| 1917 | Third Battle of Ypres (Passchendaele) | 26 October – 10 November |
| 1918 | Battle of Amiens | 8–11 August |
| 1918 | Actions round Damery | 15–17 August |
| 1918 | Battle of the Scarpe | 26–30 August |
| 1918 | Battle of Arras | 21 August – 3 September |
| 1918 | Battle of Drocourt-Quéant | 2–3 September |
| 1918 | Battle of the Canal du Nord | 27 September – 1 October |
| 1918 | Battle of Cambrai | 8–9 October |
| 1918 | Pursuit to Mons | 10 October – 11 November |

After the cessation of hostilities on 11 November 1918, the 1st Division was selected to form part of the occupation forces on the right bank of the Rhine, and General MacDonnell took the salute on 13 December when his veterans crossed the bridge at Cologne with fixed bayonets. During April 1919, the troops embarked and returned to Canada for demobilization. The total casualties of the infantry battalions were 52,559, of which 15,055 (nearly the original strength of the entire division) were fatal. Twenty-four soldiers of the division were awarded the Victoria Cross.

== Second World War (1939–1945) ==
The division was remobilized in September 1939, designated as the 1st Canadian Division, before Canada's formal entrance into the Second World War, to be later joined by both the 2nd and 3rd Canadian Infantry Divisions. The division, under the command of Major General Andrew McNaughton, left Halifax from Pier 21 in two heavily escorted convoys. The first departed on 10 December, three months after the declaration of war, and the second departed on 22 December 1939, with additional troops reaching England in February 1940. In 1941, the formation adopted the red rectangular battle patch insignia worn by the 1st Canadian Division in the Great War.

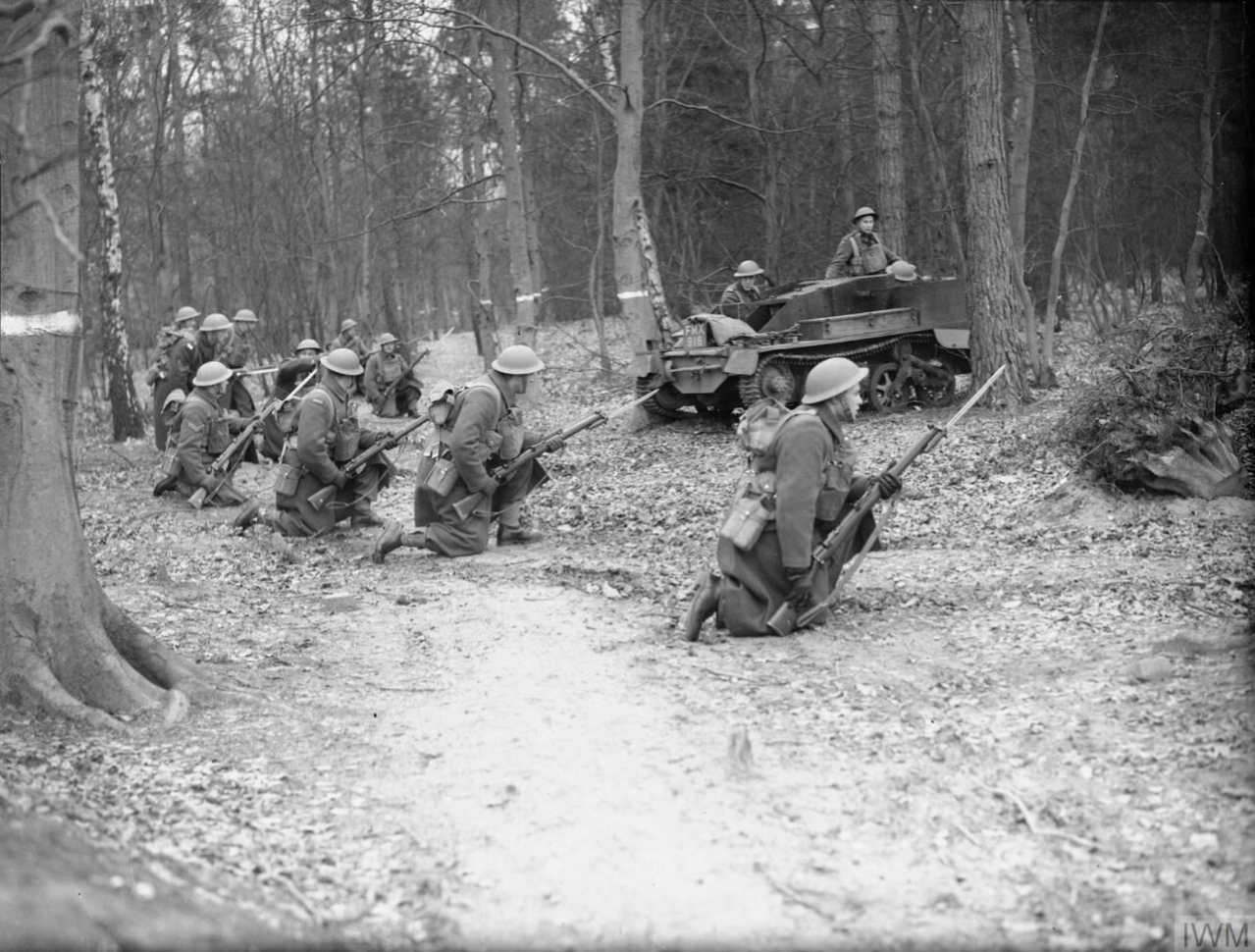
Infantry and Bren gun carriers of The West Nova Scotia Regiment in training at Aldershot, Hampshire, England, 29 February 1940.

All elements of the division were far from completely equipped on mobilization: of the artillery and machine guns on hand, most were obsolete, and the troops lacked steel helmets. Only gradually did a full complement of more modern weapons, equipment, and transport begin reaching the division in 1940.

Nevertheless, in the wake of the disastrous Battle of France and the withdrawal of the British Expeditionary Force (BEF) during the Dunkirk evacuation in May 1940, the 1st Canadian Division was ordered to France the following month. Among the infantry units that landed at Brest were The Royal Canadian Regiment (RCR), The 48th Highlanders of Canada and The Hastings and Prince Edward Regiment, all part of the 1st Canadian Infantry Brigade. Members of the RCR were present in France at least until 16 June, after the French capital of Paris had fallen to German forces, and returned almost immediately after. The 48th's withdrawal was not without some excitement.

The division returned to England for the defence of Great Britain in the case of a German invasion. Soon afterwards, Major General McNaughton was promoted to command of the British VII Corps (later designated the Canadian Corps) and was succeeded by Major General George Pearkes. In January 1943, the division was redesignated "1st Canadian Infantry Division."

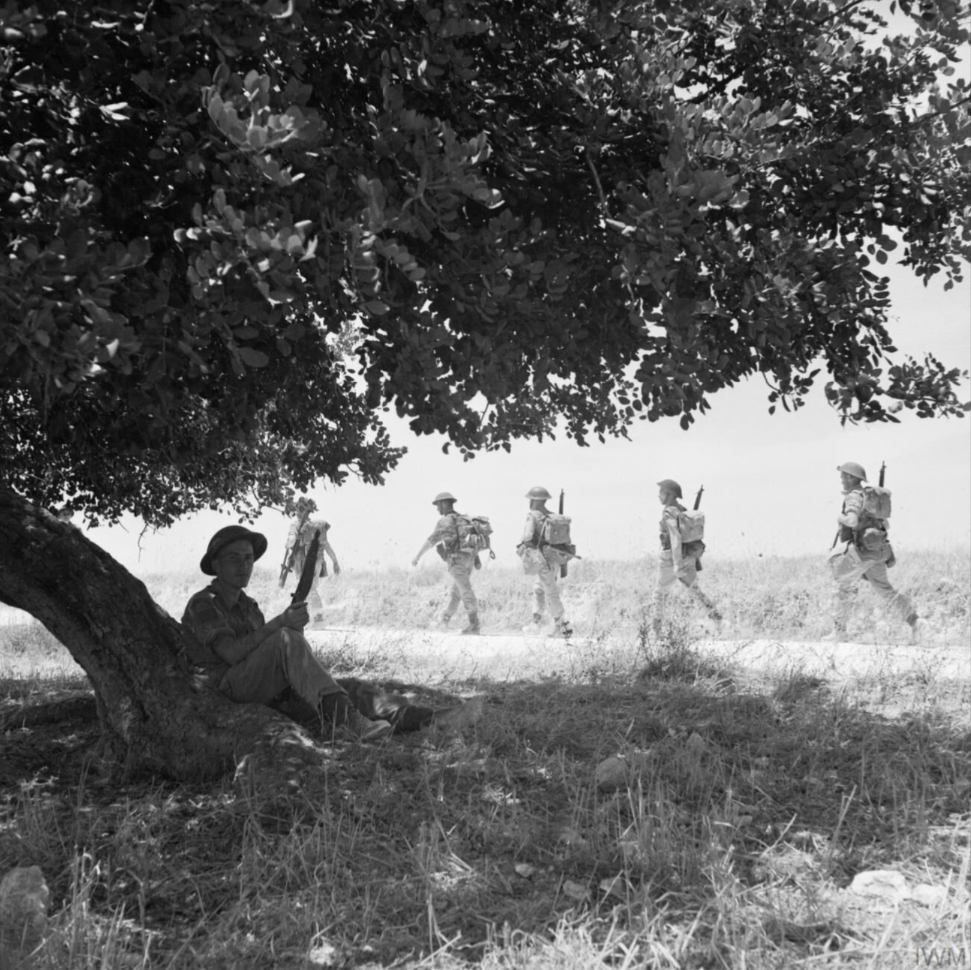
Canadian troops of The Carleton and York Regiment move inland from the beaches after landing in Sicily, 13 July 1943.

The division transferred to the Mediterranean theatre in June 1943 where the division, now under the command of Major General Guy Simonds after Major General Harry Salmon (who had taken command in September 1942) was killed in an air crash, took part in Operation Husky, code name for the Allied assault landing on Sicily on 10 July 1943, which ended after just 28 days. The division came under command of the British XXX Corps, serving alongside the veteran 51st (Highland) Division, part of the British Eighth Army, commanded by General Sir Bernard Montgomery. The campaign cost the division over 2,100 casualties, with 562 Canadians killed in action.

Soon after the conquest of Sicily, the division transferred to the British XIII Corps, but now serving alongside the British 5th Infantry Division (which had also fought in Husky), then landed in Calabria as part of Operation Baytown on the Italian mainland and fought its way up the Italian peninsula, advancing to the other side of the boot (the “heel”), before withdrawing from the front lines where it fought an occasional rearguard action. The division was put back into the front lines to participate in the Moro River Campaign. The division, now under Major General Chris Vokes, supported by tanks of the 1st Canadian Armoured Brigade, took part in the Battle of Ortona, fighting against German Fallschirmjäger–crack air force paratroops of the 1st Parachute Division–over Christmas 1943. Both sides suffered heavy losses in the fight for the town, which a reporter for The New York Times had begun calling a "miniature Stalingrad", based on the ferocity of the street fighting and the heavy losses on both sides, with the Canadians suffering 650 casualties, mainly in the 3rd Brigade. By 27 December, what remained of Ortona, after days of shelling and aerial bombardment, was in Canadian hands.

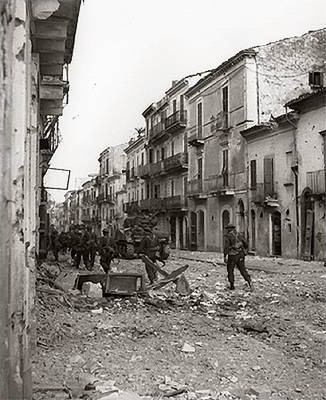
Infantrymen of the Loyal Edmonton Regiment and tanks from the Three Rivers Regiment during the Battle for Ortona, December 1943.

After this, the division was rested and many months of static warfare ensued. The division then went on to break out of the Eighth Army's bridgehead with the second wave in the spring offensive, Operation Diadem, the Fourth Battle of Monte Cassino. The 4th Princess Louise Dragoon Guards, the reconnaissance (or 'recce') regiment serving with the 1st Canadian Division, was the first of the Eighth Army's units to cross the Hitler Line in May 1944, below Pontecorvo in its armoured cars.

After heavy fighting in front of the Gothic Line throughout the summer, the 1st Canadian Infantry Division spent the next several months fighting, as it had the previous fall, for a succession of heavily defended river crossings surrounded by high ground. By the time the division reached the Senio, as the icy rain began giving way to snow in the Canadian sector, a decision had been reached to transfer the entire I Canadian Corps, 1st Infantry Division included, to the Netherlands. By the end of March 1945, all Canadian Army units serving with Allied Forces Mediterranean (formerly the Allied Armies in Italy) had been transferred to the Western Front and Operation Goldflake, the reunion of the 1st Infantry Division and 1st Armoured Brigade and First Canadian Army, commanded by Lieutenant-General Harry Crerar, was accomplished. The division, now under Major General Harry Foster, went on to take part in the Western Allied invasion of Germany, the liberation of a majority of the Netherlands including the liberation of Arnhem, and the war in Europe came to an end soon after, on 8 May 1945, Victory in Europe Day. The headquarters of the 1st Canadian Infantry Division was officially disbanded on 15 September 1945.

Three members of the 1st Canadian Infantry Division were awarded the Victoria Cross during the Italian Campaign. They were Captain Paul Triquet of the Royal 22^{e} Régiment, Major John Keefer Mahony of The Westminster Regiment and Private Ernest "Smoky" Smith of the Seaforth Highlanders of Canada.

=== Order of battle 1939–1945 ===
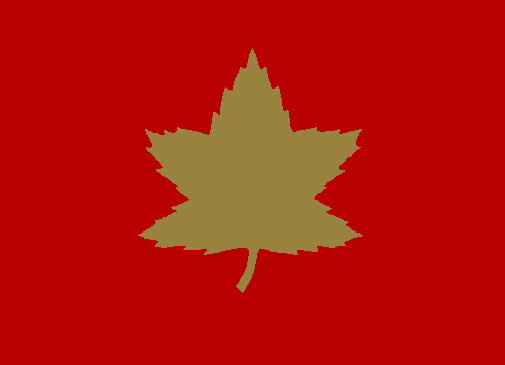
Formation sign used to identify vehicles of the 1st Canadian Infantry Division during the war.

HQ

- 1st Canadian Infantry Division Defence and Employment Platoon (Lorne Scots)

Royal Canadian Armoured Corps

- 4th Reconnaissance Regiment (4th Princess Louise Dragoon Guards)

Royal Canadian Artillery

- 1st Field Regiment, R.C.H.A.
- 2nd Field Regiment
- 3rd Field Regiment
- 1st Anti-Tank Regiment
- 2nd Light Anti-Aircraft Regiment
- 12th Canadian Meteorological Section

Royal Canadian Infantry Corps

- The Saskatoon Light Infantry (M.G.) – Machine gun battalion
- 1st Canadian Infantry Brigade:
  - The Royal Canadian Regiment
  - The Hastings and Prince Edward Regiment
  - 48th Highlanders of Canada
  - 1st Canadian Infantry Brigade Ground Defence Platoon (Lorne Scots)
- 2nd Canadian Infantry Brigade:
  - Princess Patricia's Canadian Light Infantry
  - The Seaforth Highlanders of Canada
  - The Loyal Edmonton Regiment
  - 2nd Canadian Infantry Brigade Ground Defence Platoon (Lorne Scots)
- 3rd Canadian Infantry Brigade:
  - Royal 22^{e} Régiment
  - The Carleton and York Regiment
  - The West Nova Scotia Regiment
  - 3rd Canadian Infantry Brigade Ground Defence Platoon (Lorne Scots)

1st Canadian Armoured Brigade

- 11th Armoured Regiment (The Ontario Regiment)
- 12th Armoured Regiment (Three Rivers Regiment)
- 14th Armoured Regiment (Calgary Regiment)

Royal Canadian Corps of Signals

- 1st Canadian Divisional Signals

Royal Canadian Engineers

- 1st Canadian Field Company
- 3rd Canadian Field Company
- 4th Canadian Field Company
- 2nd Canadian Field Park Company
- 1st Canadian Bridging Platoon

Royal Canadian Army Service Corps

- 1 Canadian Infantry Brigade Company
- 2 Canadian Infantry Brigade Company
- 3 Canadian Infantry Brigade Company
- 1 Canadian Infantry Divisional Troops Company
- No. 83 Company – originally a part of 1st Canadian Armoured Brigade, joined in 1943.

Royal Canadian Army Medical Corps

- No. 4 Canadian Field Ambulance
- No. 5 Canadian Field Ambulance
- No. 9 Canadian Field Ambulance
- No. 2 Canadian Field Hygiene Section
- No. 2 Canadian Light Field Ambulance – originally a part of 1st Canadian Armoured Brigade, joined in 1943.

Royal Canadian Ordnance Corps

- 1st Canadian Infantry Divisional Ordnance Field Park
- 1st Canadian Mobile Laundry and Bath Unit
- No. 1 Army Tank Brigade Sub-Park – originally a part of 1st Canadian Armoured Brigade, joined in 1943.
- 1st Tank Brigade Workshop – originally a part of 1st Canadian Armoured Brigade, joined in 1943.

Royal Canadian Electrical and Mechanical Engineers

- 1st Canadian Infantry Brigade Workshop
- 2nd Canadian Infantry Brigade Workshop
- 3rd Canadian Infantry Brigade Workshop
- No. 1 Infantry Troops Workshop

Royal Canadian Army Pay Corps

- 1st Canadian Field Cash Office

Royal Canadian Postal Corps

- 1 Canadian Infantry Division Postal Unit

Royal Canadian Dental Corps

- 1st Canadian Dental Company

Canadian Provost Corps

- No. 1 Provost Company (RCMP)

In July 1944, the divisional reconnaissance battalion, the 4th Princess Louise Dragoon Guards, converted to infantry and transferred to the 12th Canadian Infantry Brigade of the 5th Canadian Armoured Division, to be replaced by The Royal Canadian Dragoons. The Princess Louise returned to its original mechanized role in Northwest Europe in March 1945, and The Royal Canadian Dragoons became the armoured car regiment of I Canadian Corps.

=== Commanding officers ===
| Date | General Officer Commanding |
|---|---|
| 17 Oct 1939 – 19 Jul 1940 | Major-General Andrew McNaughton CB, CMG, DSO |
| 20 Jul 1940 – 1 Sep 1942 | Major-General George Pearkes VC, DSO, MC |
| 8 Sep 1942 – 29 Apr 1943 | Major-General Harry Salmon MC |
| 29 Apr – 31 Oct 1943 | Major-General Guy Simonds CBE, DSO |
| 1 Nov 1943 – 30 Nov 1944 | Major-General Christopher Vokes CBE, DSO |
| 1 Dec 1944 – 15 Sep 1945 | Major-General Harry Foster CBE, DSO |

=== Battles ===
- Italian Campaign
- Allied invasion of Sicily
- Allied invasion of Italy
- The Moro River
- Motta Montecorvino
- Ortona
- Winter Line
  - Hitler Line
  - Bernhardt Line
- Gothic Line
  - Rimini
  - Lamone Crossing
- The Western Front
- Liberation of the Netherlands

== Cold War ==
In the post-war reorganization of reserve units, a "Headquarters 1st Infantry Division" (later re-designated "Headquarters 1st Division") was authorized on 1 April 1946. It remained dormant, however, and was formally disbanded on 21 July 1954. In the meantime, a new Headquarters 1st Canadian Infantry Division had been authorized as part of the Canadian Army Active Force on 16 October 1953, and this headquarters was established the following December.

Major-General J.M. Rockingham, CB, CBE, DSO and bar, ED, took command of the 1st Division on 1 September 1954. His Division contained the 1st Canadian Infantry Brigade, stationed in Germany, the 2nd at Edmonton and the 3rd at Valcartier, with normal supporting arms and services.

The life of this division was short as on 5 December 1957, the Minister of National Defence announced in the House of Commons that the divisional headquarters would be reduced to nil strength. Shortly thereafter, General Rockingham was transferred to Quebec Command and on 30 April 1958, the Headquarters of 1st Canadian Infantry Division was disbanded.

In 1988, a new era for the division began when the Government of Canada announced the intention to consolidate its military commitments to Europe in the Central Region. The reformation in November 1989 followed the Canadian government's decision to end the Canadian Air-Sea Transportable Brigade Group (CAST) commitment to reinforce Northern Norway. 5 Canadian Mechanized Brigade Group, based in Quebec, was thus available for other tasks. The CAST rapid-reinforcement commitment had been encountering problems, most graphically demonstrated during Exercise Brave Lion in 1986, which prompted Canada to start formal consultations with NATO about consolidating the CAST Brigade and 4 Canadian Mechanized Brigade Group, based in southern Germany. The two separate forces would have meant critical logistical and medical support needs would have gone unmet in case of real war. The hole thus created by the removal of the CAST Brigade Group was filled, to a degree, by the creation of a NATO Composite Force (NCF) to which Canada promised a battalion group.

The headquarters was established, with both 4 Brigade and 5 Brigade under command, at Kingston, Ontario, with a forward detachment at Lahr in Germany where 4 Brigade was based. The main headquarters was intended to move gradually from Kingston to Lahr over a period of time, though this never, in the event, took place. With the division having only two brigades, it was assumed that in wartime, either a German or US brigade would be assigned to provide the necessary third manoeuvre element. Although during NATO command post exercises a divisional order of battle was used that nominally included the 1 Canadian Mechanized Brigade Group as the third Maneuver brigade, field training and exercises were conducted with this notion in mind. Some changes were necessary to the two brigades, as 5 Brigade had only three-quarters of 4 Brigade's personnel and equipment with the support organizations held at the divisional level. Once reinforcements had arrived from Canada, each brigade would have had one small armoured regiment (two squadrons, each 20 tanks), and two four-company infantry battalions. Divisional troops would have been a mix of former 4 Brigade and 5 Brigade units along with some troops from 1 Canadian Mechanized Brigade Group in western Canada. 3rd Regiment Royal Canadian Horse Artillery was intended to have been re-equipped with the MLRS to provide general support, while a further engineer regiment, 6 Combat Engineer Regiment, was to have been formed. The Fort Garry Horse was also to have been re-formed to provide a divisional reconnaissance capability. As finally envisaged CENTAG wartime structure in 1989, the division was assigned to the Central Army Group Commander's tactical reserve, performing operations in support of either II (German) Corps or VII US Corps. From 1988 to 1992, the Division Headquarters focused on the training of its subordinate formations culminating in the last two of the "Rendez-Vous" series of exercises in 1989 and 1992 where the division deployed to CFB Wainwright and functioned as a headquarters in the field.

As it became obvious that the Soviet threat was disappearing in the early 1990s, the future options for Canadian forces in Europe were increasingly debated. While a battalion-sized remaining Canadian force was discussed, eventually it was decided that all Canadian land forces would leave Germany by 1994. With units disbanding around them, Division Headquarters (Forward) was repatriated to CFB Kingston on 13 June 1992, and at this time the presence of the 1st Division in Germany effectively ended. Though continuing to provide command and control capability for any multi-brigade deployment, emphasis was shifted to the joint role where the Division HQ would provide command and control of CF or multinational forces in humanitarian, UN, NATO or coalition operations. Subsequently, the successful December 1992 deployment of the Division Headquarters to Somalia in this role validated the need for this capability in the Army.

Back in Kingston, the division's aegis was reduced to two units; a new 1st Canadian Division HQ and Signals Regiment (which incorporated Division HQ) and the 1st Canadian Division Intelligence Company (1 Cdn Div Int Coy). Its new role was to be capable of deploying a land-based, Joint Task Force Headquarters at division level or a Joint Force Headquarters consisting of navy, army and air force personnel for territorial defence, contingencies and other missions including complex international scenarios. The Division HQ would train formation HQs, plan for contingencies and command assigned forces in crisis situations. The HQ had in priority, four roles operations, training, support and planning.

Headquarters 1st Canadian Division was transformed on 1 April 2000 into Canadian Forces Joint Headquarters and 1st Canadian Division Headquarters and Signal Regiment was united with 79 Communication Regiment to form the Canadian Forces Joint Signal Regiment. Both units, who remained headquartered in Kingston, were assigned as elements of Canadian Expeditionary Force Command as the deployable command headquarters for all large Canadian overseas deployments.

=== Division structure in 1989 ===
- 1 Canadian Division (Forward), Canadian Forces Base Lahr, West Germany
  - 1st Canadian Division Headquarters and Signal Regiment, CFB Lahr
  - C Sqn Royal Canadian Dragoons, CFB Gagetown (25 × Leopard C1, 12× M113, 1× M577, 2 × Bergepanzer)
  - 119 Air Defence Battery, Royal Regiment of Canadian Artillery, CFB Chatham (8 × ADATS, 10 × Javelin, 12 × M113)
  - 22 Field Squadron, Royal Canadian Engineers, CFB Gagetown
  - 1st Canadian Division Intelligence Company, CFB Kingston
  - 4 Canadian Mechanized Brigade, CFB Lahr
    - 4 Canadian Mechanized Brigade Headquarters and Signal Squadron, CFB Lahr
    - 8th Canadian Hussars (Princess Louise's), CFB Lahr (77× Leopard C1, 20× Lynx, 36× M113, 2× M577, 6× Bergepanzer)
    - 1st Battalion, Royal 22^{e} Régiment, CFB Lahr (2× M577, 65× M113, 11× Lynx, 18× M113 TUA with TOW, 24× M125 with a 81mm mortar)
    - 3rd Battalion, Royal Canadian Regiment, CFB Baden-Söllingen (2× M577, 65× M113, 11× Lynx, 18× M113 TUA with TOW, 24× M125 with a 81mm mortar)
    - 1st Regiment, Royal Canadian Horse Artillery, CFB Lahr, (2× M577, 26× M109A4, 46× M113, 24× M548)
    - 4 Combat Engineer Regiment, CFB Lahr (2× M577, 9× Badger AEV, 14× M113, 6× M548, 6× Biber bridgelayer)
    - 444 Tactical Helicopter Squadron (detached from 1 Canadian Air Division), CFB Lahr (CH136 Kiowa, UH1N)
    - 4 Service Battalion, CFB Lahr (4× M113, 2× Bergepanzer, 6× MTV-R)
    - 4 Field Ambulance, CFB Lahr
    - 4 Military Police Platoon, CFB Lahr
    - 127th Air Defence Battery (detached from 4th Air Defence Regiment, Royal Regiment of Canadian Artillery), CFB Lahr (12× ADATS, 15× Javelin, 5× M113)
  - 5 Canadian Mechanized Brigade, CFB Valcartier
    - 5 Canadian Mechanized Brigade Headquarters and Signal Squadron
    - 12^{e} Régiment blindé du Canada, (38× Cougar, 23× Lynx)
    - 2nd Battalion, Royal Canadian Regiment, (48× Grizzly, 11× Lynx)
    - 2nd Battalion, Royal 22^{e} Régiment, (48× Grizzly, 11× Lynx)
    - 3rd Battalion, Royal 22^{e} Regiment, (48× Grizzly, 11× Lynx)
    - 5^{e} Régiment d'artillerie légère du Canada, (2× M577, 25× M109A4, 46× M113, 24× M548)
    - 5 Combat Engineer Regiment
    - 430 Tactical Helicopter Squadron, (CH136 Kiowa, UH1N)
    - 5 Service Battalion
    - 5 Field Ambulance
    - 5 Military Police Platoon

== Reactivation ==
On 19 May 2010, Chief of the Defence Staff, General Walter Natynczyk, announced that the Canadian Forces would once again stand up the 1st Canadian Division at Kingston, Ontario. The role of 1st Canadian Division upon reactivation was to provide the Canadian Forces with a rapidly deployable joint command and control capacity in order to allow for a comprehensive approach to operations. As planning for the revitalised Division progressed, the HQ was tasked at very short notice to deploy to Malta as a Joint Task Force Headquarters on Operation MOBILE to coordinate the evacuation of Canadians and other civilians from Libya – a successful mission where personnel from both Canada and other nations were evacuated.

1st Cdn Div HQ officially was stood up on 7 October 2010 at Kingston, with Defence Minister Peter MacKay acting as the reviewing officer. Headquarters 1st Canadian Division is part of the Canadian Army administratively and remains at Canadian Forces Base Kingston using existing infrastructure and base support. Major-General David Fraser, former Commandant of the Canadian Forces College in Toronto and the first Canadian commander of the Multi-National Brigade (Regional Command (South)) in Afghanistan, was designated as the first commander of the newly reactivated 1st Canadian Division.

On 1 April 2015, 1st Canadian Division was transferred from the Canadian Army to Canadian Joint Operations Command (CJOC).

== Purpose-driven reorganization ==
On 10 September 2026, the Canadian Army was reorganized away from geographic divisions into mandate-driven divisions. As a result, the 1st Canadian Division became a manoeuvre division, able to operate in all types of conflicts up to and including major combat operations. The division headquarters was transferred to CFB Edmonton, and assumed command of the four existing Regular Force brigades across the country. The division also assumed command over 3 newly formed formations. The joint, deployable headquarters in CFB Kingston was renamed the Canadian Joint Response Force (CJRF) HQ and remained under the command of CJOC. CJRF remains the military’s lead headquarters for crisis response operations including non-combatant evacuation and humanitarian assistance.

=== Division structure in 2026 ===
- 1st Canadian Mechanized Brigade Group (1 CMBG)
  - Lord Strathcona's Horse (Royal Canadians) (armoured)
  - 1st Battalion, Princess Patricia's Canadian Light Infantry (mechanized infantry)
  - 2nd Battalion, Princess Patricia's Canadian Light Infantry (mechanized infantry)
  - 1 Combat Engineer Regiment, Royal Canadian Engineers (engineers)
  - 1 Signal Regiment, Royal Canadian Signals (communications)
  - 1 Service Battalion (combat support)
- 2nd Canadian Mechanized Brigade Group (2 CMBG)
  - The Royal Canadian Dragoons (armoured)
  - 1st Battalion, The Royal Canadian Regiment (mechanized infantry)
  - 2nd Battalion, The Royal Canadian Regiment (mechanized infantry)
  - 2 Combat Engineer Regiment, Royal Canadian Engineers (engineers)
  - 2 Signal Regiment, Royal Canadian Signals (communications)
  - 2 Service Battalion (combat support)
- 5th Canadian Mechanized Brigade Group (5 CMBG)
  - 12^{e} Régiment blindé du Canada (armoured)
  - 1st Battalion, Royal 22^{e} Régiment (mechanized infantry)
  - 2nd Battalion, Royal 22^{e} Régiment (mechanized infantry)
  - 5 Combat Engineer Regiment, Royal Canadian Engineers (engineers)
  - 5 Signal Regiment, Royal Canadian Signals (communications)
  - 5 Service Battalion (combat support)
- 3rd Canadian Light Infantry Regiment
  - 3rd Battalion, Princess Patricia's Canadian Light Infantry (light infantry)
  - 3rd Battalion, The Royal Canadian Regiment (light infantry)
  - 3rd Battalion, Royal 22^{e} Régiment (light infantry)
- 1st Canadian Artillery Brigade
  - 1st Regiment, Royal Canadian Horse Artillery (field artillery)
  - 2nd Regiment, Royal Canadian Horse Artillery (field artillery)
  - 5^{e} Régiment d'artillerie légère du Canada (field artillery)
- 6th Canadian Combat Support Brigade (6 CCSB)
  - 4th Artillery Regiment (General Support), Royal Canadian Artillery (air defence)
  - 8th (Air Defence) Regiment, Royal Canadian Artillery (air defence)
  - 4 Engineer Support Regiment, Royal Canadian Engineers (engineers)
  - 21 Electronic Warfare Regiment, Royal Canadian Signals (electronic warfare)
  - Canadian Army Intelligence Regiment (intelligence)
  - Influence Activities Task Force (intelligence)
  - 6 Tactical Civil-Military Cooperation Company (civil coordination)
- 1st Canadian Sustainment Brigade (1 CSB)

A number of new units are due to be formed as part of the restructuring to enhance the division's capabilities:

- 10 Signal Regiment, Royal Canadian Signals—new divisional signals unit
- 1st Chemical, Biological, Radiological and Nuclear Defence Battalion—attached to 6 CSSB
- Intelligence, Surveillance, Target Acquisition and Reconnaissance Battalion—attached to 6 CSSB
- 6 Service Battalion—attached to 6 CSSB
- 9th Rocket Regiment, Royal Canadian Artillery—attached to 1st Canadian Artillery Brigade
- 1st Logistics Battalion—attached to 1 CSB

== See also ==
- First Canadian Army (World War II)
- 2nd Canadian Division
- 3rd Canadian Division
- 4th Canadian Division
- 5th Canadian Division
