= 33 Service Battalion =

Canadian military unit

- Active: 1965–2010 (as 26 and 28 Service Battalion) 2010 – present (as 33 Service Battalion)
- Country: Canada
- Branch: (Canadian Army) Primary Reserve
- Part of: 4th Canadian Division
- Garrison/HQ: Ottawa, Ontario
- Motto: DEVOIR AVANT TOUT
- Colors: Oriental Blue, Gold, and Marine Corps Scarlet
- March: "Duty Above All"
- Website: army-armee.forces.gc.ca/en/33-service-battalion/index.page

Commanders
- Commanding Officer: Lieutenant-Colonel Shelley Worsley, CD
- Regimental Sergeant-Major: Chief Warrant Officer E.P. Smith, CD
- Colonel of the Regiment: Honorary Colonel (BGen, ret'd) Peter Holt, OMM, CD

Insignia
- Abbreviation: 33 Svc Bn / 33 B^{on} Svc

33 Service Battalion is a Canadian Forces Primary Reserve unit in the Canadian Army. The battalion has three companies located in northern and eastern Ontario - at the M.L. Troy Armoury in North Bay, Pine Street Armoury in Sault Ste. Marie, and the Major Holland Armoury in Ottawa. The battalion is under command of 33 Canadian Brigade Group (33 CBG), itself commanded by the 4th Canadian Division (4XX). The battalion is made up of officers and soldiers primarily from the Royal Canadian Logistics Service (RCLS) and the Royal Canadian Electrical and Mechanical Engineers (RCEME) providing Combat Service Support to 33 CBG and other military organizations in eastern and northern Ontario - by means of transportation, supply, administration, food services, and mechanical repair and recovery activities.

The battalion is a cohesive and integrated team of full-time and part-time reservists, supported by a dedicated cadre of Regular Force personnel. Members are expected to maintain a high level of proficiency in core soldiering and warfighting skills, while simultaneously developing specialized expertise within their respective trades.

The battalion’s primary focus is on conducting and preparing for operations; however, it also plays a critical role in delivering combat service support to the other units within 33 CBG. Over the years, 33 Svc Bn has consistently generated, trained, and deployed personnel to the National Support Element (NSE) and other formations in support of various Canadian international missions.

The unit motto is Devoir Avant Tout which translates to "Duty Above All". The current commanding officer is Lieutenant-colonel Shelley Worsley and the regimental sergeant-major is Chief Warrant Officer Emily Smith.

== History ==
The first reserve service support unit was established in Ottawa on 1 July 1903 with the formation of a 1st Class Stores Section of the Canadian Stores Department (renamed the Canadian Ordnance Corps in 1907). The section was based in the Military Stores Building located behind Cartier Square Drill Hall (CSDH). The unit was composed of members of the Permanent Force, civil service personnel, and accepted transfers from both the Governor General's Foot Guards (GGFG) and the 43rd Regiment, Duke of Cornwall’s Own Rifles (perpetuated by The Cameron Highlanders of Ottawa (Duke of Edinburgh’s Own); both units being headquartered at CSDH.

On 1 December 1903, to augment the first permanent Canadian Army Service Corps units established on 1 November 1901 under General Order No. 141, the formation of four additional non-permanent companies was authorized. Ottawa stood up No. 5 Company under the command of Major S.E. de la Ronde. To provide oversight and continuity, a Permanent Force detachment—No. 1 Detachment—was also established in Ottawa, consisting of five personnel of all ranks. This detachment was commanded by Captain W.A. Simson, the third permanent officer to join the Canadian Permanent Army Service Corps (CPASC). In 1920, Simson would go on to serve as the District Supply Officer in Toronto, attaining the rank of Colonel—the highest rank an officer could achieve in peacetime.

During the First World War, the non-permanent units of No. 4 Militia District (Ottawa) contributed personnel to the Canadian Expeditionary Force (CEF). In 1914, No. 5 Company (CASC) deployed to Camp Valcartier, where it provided transport and logistical support to CEF units preparing for overseas service. The company also supplied personnel to the 1st Divisional Trains, supporting operations in both England and France.

During the Second World War, 1st Corps Troops, RCASC, mobilized at Lansdowne Park, forming No. 1 Petrol Park and No. 1 Ordnance Company. Upon arrival in England, these units were reorganized into the 54 and 55 General Transport Companies, RCASC, and went on to serve with distinction in both the Italian and European campaigns.

At the outbreak of the Korean War, 1st Corps Troops provided personnel and command staff to form 54 General Transport Company, RCASC, which served with the 25th Canadian Infantry Brigade of the 1st Commonwealth Division. In recognition of its outstanding contributions to the division, the unit was awarded the Commonwealth Shield trophy—an honour that was later institutionalized as an annual award presented to the best Army Reserve Transport Company in Canada.

Although none of these units can be officially recognized as direct predecessors of the current battalion, each—along with other formations established to provide administration and logistics to the Canadian Army—shares historical and functional ties to the modern combat service support unit. As such, these non-permanent units are considered an integral part of the battalion’s heritage.

The battalion’s lineage, tracing back to the inception of service support units, is complex—marked by numerous changes in organizational structure and nomenclature from the pre-First World War era through the transition from a horse-based military to today’s modern mechanized force. The increasing complexity of military equipment, along with evolving tactics and operational demands, led to significant shifts in the ideology of Combat Service Support. Central to this doctrine were three primary providers: the Canadian Ordnance Corps—which received the 'Royal' designation in 1936—was responsible for procuring, managing, and maintaining all material required by the Canadian Army; the Royal Canadian Army Service Corps, granted the 'Royal' prefix in 1919, provided supply, transportation, and food services; and the Royal Canadian Electrical and Mechanical Engineers, established in 1944, was created to maintain increasingly complex equipment. These corps formed the foundation of Canada’s logistics capability. Eventually, the first two corps were amalgamated into the Logistics Branch, now known as the Royal Canadian Logistics Service.

In 1963, the Canadian Army conducted a trial of integrated Combat Service Support capabilities at CFB Gagetown, known as the Experimental Service Battalion. This marked the first attempt to establish a single unit capable of sustaining a Brigade Battle Group in combat. While the structure of the unit has evolved since its original design, its core functions remain largely consistent to this day.

On 1 January 1965, following the proven success and benefits of the experiment, the immediate predecessors of today’s Service Battalions were officially established. Initially there were 25 Service Battalions designated from coast to coast, and in 1968 another was established at Canadian Forces Base Lahr. The experimental unit was redesignated as 3 Service Battalion and serviced 3 Canadian Infantry Brigade Group, but was disbanded in the early 1970s. Of these initial units, 21 were Reserve Force battalions - six being located in Ontario: Windsor, London, Hamilton, Toronto, North Bay (with a Maintenance Detachment in Sault Ste Marie), and Ottawa.

The Ottawa Service Battalion was created through the amalgamation of several units: 130 Transport Company (RCASC), 3 Ordnance Company (RCOC), 28 Technical Squadron (RCEME), 13 Personnel Depot, 113 Manning Depot, 10 Medical Company, and 54 Dental Unit. These units were disbanded to form a unified battalion, initially composed of a single transport unit and a training wing. The battalion was later expanded to include a headquarters element — consisting of executive officer positions, regimental sergeant-major, and key personnel from the Administrative Branch providing clerical support — as well as dedicated transport, supply, maintenance, and medical companies. In 1976, a military police detachment was also attached to the unit. The Ottawa Service Battalion was originally stationed at the Wallis House Armoury on Rideau Street, in the heart of Ottawa.

In 1975, all Canadian Army Service Battalions were assigned numerical designations based on geographic location, beginning in western Canada. As part of this reorganization, the unit in Sault Ste. Marie and North Bay were designated as 26 Service Battalion, while the Ottawa unit became 28 Service Battalion.

Over the next 35 years, Service Battalion units remained relatively stable, though several subtle organizational changes occurred. In 1980, the medical company was detached from the battalion and established as an independent unit headquartered at the National Defence Medical Centre. It continues to operate as 28 Medical Company. In 1990, the battalion relocated from Wallis House, marching to its current home at Major Holland VC Armoury on Walkley Road. In 1998, the Administrative Branch was disbanded, with its functions and personnel transitioning to the Logistics Branch—now known as the RCLS. In 2004, the military police platoon was reassigned to 2 Area Support Group and is now designated as 33 MP Platoon.

In 2009, 26 Service Battalion and 28 Service Battalion were amalgamated. As part of a national reorganization of Service Battalions, the newly formed unit was renumbered in 2010 as 33 Service Battalion.

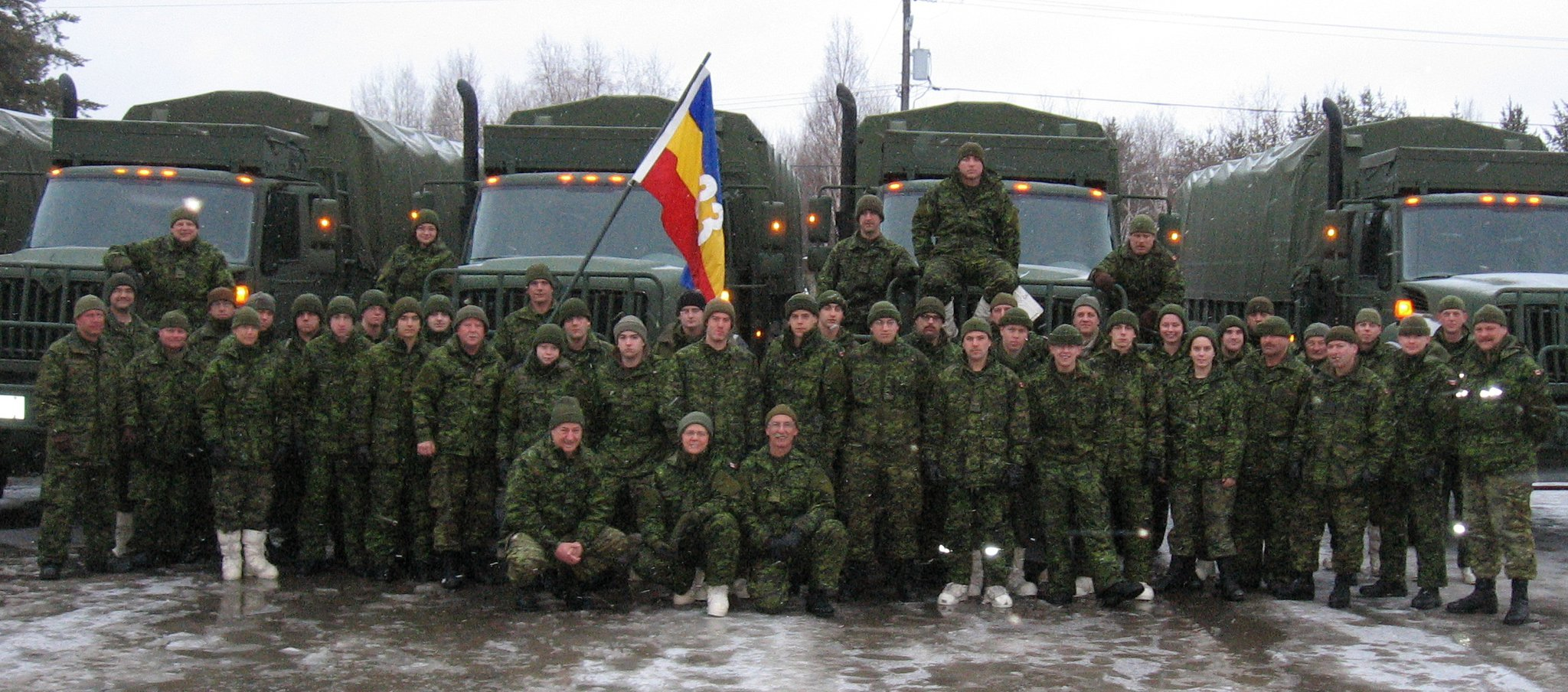
For the first time, members of 33 Service Battalion from all three geographic locations united under a single unit flag during a concentrated exercise in Gogama, Ontario. Together, they formed a composite trades platoon to provide critical support to the broader 33 Canadian Brigade Group.

The battalion and its perpetuated units have earned numerous awards and honours over the years, most notably winning the prestigious Commonwealth Shield on three occasions, with the most recent award in 1982. This trophy was presented annually to the top-performing Army Reserve Transport Company in Canada, recognizing excellence in operational readiness, training, and unit cohesion.

In 1981, 28 Service Battalion was granted the Freedom of the City of Ottawa, a ceremonial honour symbolizing trust and recognition by the local community. In 1987, 26 Service Battalion received the Freedom of the City in both Sault Ste. Marie (27 September) and North Bay (3 October), marking significant milestones in the unit’s regional presence and community engagement.

Following the amalgamation in 2010, 33 Service Battalion exercised its right to march through the streets of Ottawa for the first time as a unified formation, proudly representing members from all three of its geographic locations.

Members of the battalion have proudly served on a wide range of domestic and international missions. Domestically, they have contributed to operations such as Operation RECUPERATION during the January 1998 North American ice storm, Op LENTUS 17-03 providing flood relief in the Outaouais region of Quebec, and Op LENTUS 19-03 supporting flood response efforts in the Ottawa Valley area of Ontario. During the global COVID-19 pandemic, members were deployed on Operation LASER, part of the Canadian Armed Forces’ national response.

Internationally, Battalion members have participated in combat missions in Bosnia, Croatia, and Afghanistan. They also have a longstanding history of involvement in United Nations peacekeeping operations, including deployments to UNEF II, UNDOF, UNFICYP, UNIFIL, UNTAG, UNPROFOR, and UNMISS.

== The Unit Today ==
Although Canadian Service Battalions were originally a product of the Cold War—designed to operate as complete units in support of Canadian Army brigades and brigade groups in the field—the nature of military operations has evolved significantly. The September 11 terrorist attacks and the emergence of the non-linear battlefield have shifted the focus toward more flexible, task-specific support models. In operations such as those in Afghanistan, service support has increasingly been delivered through the National Support Element (NSE) concept—modular, mission-tailored support that is not necessarily drawn from a single Service Battalion.

While Service Battalions continue to train for operations in conventional battlespaces, their primary role today is force generation. They provide essential support in garrison and augment deploying units, ensuring operational readiness across a broad spectrum of missions.

33 Service Battalion continues to play a vital role in force generation, providing trained personnel—including officers and tradespeople—to meet mission-specific requirements. The unit actively recruits and trains individuals in the following occupations:

Logistics Officers – Responsible for coordinating transportation, equipment, and supplies to support the global movement of Canadian Armed Forces (CAF) personnel and cargo of all types and sizes.

Electrical and Mechanical Engineering Officers – Oversee the maintenance and support of all Army equipment, as well as land-based systems used by the Royal Canadian Navy and Royal Canadian Air Force.

Mobile Support Equipment Operators – Operate a wide range of military vehicles, from standard automobiles to snow removal equipment and all-terrain vehicles.

Materiel Management Technicians – Ensure the timely availability of supplies and services essential to CAF operations.

Vehicle Technicians – Maintain, repair, and overhaul land vehicles and related systems to ensure operational readiness.

Weapons Technicians – Maintain and repair weapons, weapons systems, and associated equipment.

Food Services Technicians – Cooks prepare nutritious meals for CAF members in both kitchen and field environments.

Financial Services Administrators – Provide financial and budgetary support across all military activities.

Human Resources Administrators – Deliver administrative and HR support to ensure smooth personnel operations throughout the CAF.

== Order of Battle ==
=== Overview ===
33 Service Battalion is a Combat Service Support unit composed of three companies: Headquarters Company (Ottawa), 28 Composite Services Company (Ottawa), and 26 Composite Services Company, which includes a combined Logistics Platoon in North Bay with an embedded Technical Services Section (TSS), as well as a Maintenance Support Detachment located in Sault Ste. Marie.

=== Companies ===
| 33 Service Battalion | Command Team | Location |
|---|---|---|
| Headquarters Company | Officer Commanding: Captain Wayne Podolsky Company Sergeant-Major: Master Warrant Officer Mac Davis-Kelly | Ottawa, Ontario |
| 28 Composite Services Company (28 Coy) | Officer Commanding: Major Matthew Hou Company Sergeant-Major: Master Warrant Officer Erin Carter | Ottawa, Ontario |
| 26 Composite Services Company (26 Coy) | Officer Commanding: Major Greg Warne Company Sergeant-Major: Warrant Officer R.J. Aultman | North Bay and Sault Ste Marie, Ontario |

== Deployed operations (Combined 33 and 28/26 Svc Bn History) ==
=== International ===
- Operation Unifier – Ukraine (2015–present)
- Operation Impact – Middle East (2014–present)
- Operation Reassurance – Poland/Latvia (2014–present)
- Operation Soprano – South Sudan (2011-present)
- Operation Kolbold - Kosovo (2008-Present)
- Operation Attention – Afghanistan (2011–2014)
- Operation Archer – Afghanistan (2005–2013)
- Operation Athena – Afghanistan (2005–2011)
- Operation Kinetic – Macedonia (1999–2000)
- Operation Palladium – Bosnia (1995–2004)
- Operation Marquis – Cambodia (1992–1993)
- Operation Danaca – Middle East (1974–2006)
- Operation Snowgoose – Cyprus (1964–1993)

=== Domestic ===
- Operation LASER - Domestic response to the COVID-19 pandemic (2021-2022)
- Operation Lentus 19-03 – New Brunswick, Quebec, and Ontario floods April-June 2019)
- Operation Lentus 17-03 – Quebec and Newfoundland floods (May 2017)
- Operation Podium – Winter Olympic Games in Vancouver, B.C. (winter 2010)
- Operation Recuperation – ice storm relief in eastern Canada (January–February 1998)
- Operation Assistance – Manitoba flood response (April–May 1997)
- Operation Gamescan – Summer Olympic Games in Montreal, Quebec (1976)

== Leadership ==
Commanding officers: Most current change of command occurred 25 May 2025 between the outgoing LCol Marshall and incoming LCol Worsley.

- 2010–2012: Lieutenant-colonel Bruce Playfair, CD
- 2012–2015: Lieutenant-colonel Sheila K. Chapman, CD
- 2015–2019: Lieutenant-colonel David A. Paterson, CD
- 2020–2023: Lieutenant-colonel Richard D. Gallant, CD
- 2023–2025: Lieutenant-colonel Neil B. Marshall, CD
- 2025-Present: Lieutenant-colonel Shelley M. Worsley, CD

Regimental sergeants major: Most current change of appointment occurred 18 September 2025 between the outgoing CWO Carter and incoming CWO Smith.

- 2010–2013: Chief Warrant Officer Robert Winfield, CD
- 2013–2017: Chief Warrant Officer Denis Lessard, CD
- 2017–2020: Chief Warrant Officer Marc Richard, CD
- 2020–2023: Chief Warrant Officer Kriston D. Carter, CD
- 2023–2024: Chief Warrant Officer Steven Slominski, CD
- 2024–2025: Chief Warrant Officer Kriston D. Carter, CD
- 2025-Present: Chief Warrant Officer Emily P. Smith, CD

Honorary colonels of the regiment:

- 2008–2020: Honorary colonel Shirley Westeinde, CD
- 2015–Present: Honorary colonel (BGen ret'd) Peter Holt, OMM, CD

== Athletics ==
Since its establishment in 2010, 33 Service Battalion has placed a strong emphasis on sport and physical fitness. The battalion’s hockey team competes annually in the Sgt. Rick Foldek Memorial Tournament hosted by the Brockville Rifles, earning notable achievements including winning the 'B' pool in 2011, the 'C' pool in both 2014 and 2015, and finishing as overall runner-up in 2016.

The battalion has been participating in the annual 2 Canadian Mechanized Brigade Group (CMBG) Iron Warrior competition since 2013 - the team demonstrating exceptional performance, winning the 33 CBG Unit Award a record five times — four of those consecutively from 2016 to 2019, and again in 2023. In 2018, the battalion made history as the first reserve service battalion selected to participate in the 102nd Annual International Four Days Marches Nijmegen.

Individual members have also earned distinguished accolades. Notably, Sgt. Erin Carter won the women’s category of the 2018 2 CMBG Iron Warrior (Day 1 edition), and Lt. Steven Jackson secured second place in the grueling 6633 Arctic Ultra race in February 2020.

== Honours and awards ==
- Commonwealth Shield won 3 times, the latest in 1982
- Freedom of the City of Ottawa: 1981 (as 28 Service Battalion)
- Freedom of the City of North Bay: 3 October 1987 (as 26 Service Battalion)
- Freedom of the City of Sault Ste Marie: 27 September 1987 (as 26 Service Battalion)
- 33 CBG Iron Warrior Champions 2016, 2017, 2018, 2019, 2023

== Unit insignia ==
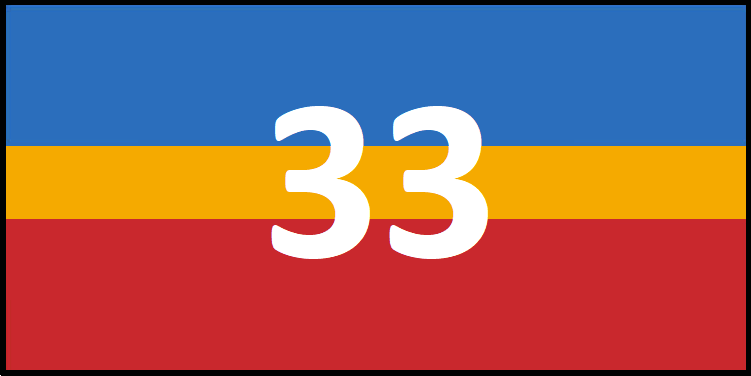
The 33 Service Battalion flag.

The 33 Service Battalion Unit flag is steeped with the traditions of the founding corps. The flag is a tri-color with the top and bottom equaling 2/5ths of the height each and the centre equaling 1/5th of the height. The official colours of the unit flag are Oriental blue (top) and marine corps scarlet (bottom) with an intervening gold stripe. Then it has a large white numerals representing the number of the service battalion emblazoned on both sides in the flag's centre. These regal colours have a long history of association with army services. The Oriental blue colour of the flag is reminiscent of the Royal Canadian Ordnance Corps (RCOC) flag while the gold colour can be found on the former banners of the Royal Canadian Army Service Corps (RCASC), the Royal Canadian Electrical Mechanical Engineers Corps (RCEME), and the Royal Canadian Army Pay Corps (RCAPC). The scarlet colour refers to the scarlet accoutrements on the RCOC and RCEME dress uniforms earned through its close association with the Royal Canadian Artillery in the early 1900s. This flag was designed by Chief Warrant Officer Phil Raven during his time as regimental sergeant-major of 2 Service Battalion in the 1970s.

== Cadet corps ==
Active:

- 2310 Royal Canadian Army Cadet Corps – Sault Ste Marie
- 2332 Royal Canadian Army Cadet Corps – Ottawa
