= Service battalion =

A service battalion (Svc Bn; French: bataillon des services or b^{on} svc) is a unit of the Canadian Armed Forces (CAF) that provides combat service support to a brigade group and its elements.

It is able to fight in a defensive role as well as provide the vital logistical support to sustain the operations of the other units within the brigade group.

This is different to the "(service) battalion" designation in use in the British Army in 1914–1915 onwards. Such battalions were for war service only, having a temporary nature, like that of the bataillon de marche concept of the French Army.

== Sub-units ==
Service battalions are normally subdivided into:

- A battalion headquarters (Bn HQ), concerned with overseeing the effective training and employment of all companies within the battalion. The HQ usually consists of the command staff, an orderly room, an operations cell, and a training cell.
- A transportation company (Tn Coy), which provides transportation and movement support, both tactical and administrative, to the brigade.
- A supply company (Sup Coy) which provides general supply support to the brigade.
- A maintenance company (Maint Coy), which provides automotive, mechanical, electrical, weapon maintenance and support to the brigade.
- An administration company (Admin Coy), which provides internal service support (signals and communication, transportation, supply, maintenance, food services, and military police support) to the battalion and its elements.

== Flag ==
12 (Vancouver) Service Battalion Flag

The unit flag of a service battalion is steeped with the traditions of its founding corps. The flag is a tri-color with the top and bottom equalling two-fifths of the height each and the centre equalling one-fifth of the height. The official colours of the unit flag are Oriental blue (top) and marine corps scarlet (bottom) with an intervening gold stripe. Each battalion's flag has a large white Arabic numeral representing the number of the service battalion emblazoned on both sides in the flag's centre.

These regal colours have a long history of association with army services. The Oriental blue colour of the flag is reminiscent of the Royal Canadian Ordnance Corps (RCOC) flag while the gold colour can be found on the former banners of the Royal Canadian Army Service Corps (RCASC), the Royal Canadian Electrical Mechanical Engineers Corps (RCEME), and the Royal Canadian Army Pay Corps (RCAPC). The scarlet colour may have some reference to the Royal Canadian Army Medical Corps (RCAMC); the militia medical companies were, for a short period in the early 1970s, incorporated into the service battalion organizations. More correctly it refers to the scarlet accoutrements on the RCOC and RCEME dress uniforms earned through its close association with the Royal Canadian Artillery in the early 1900s.

This flag was designed by Chief Warrant Officer Phil Raven during his time as regimental sergeant major of 2 service battalion in the 1970s.

== Service battalions of the CF ==
The following are the current service battalions in the CF, by brigade:

=== Regular Force ===
- 1 Canadian Mechanized Brigade Group (1 CMBG), Edmonton, Alberta
  - 1 Service Battalion (1 Svc Bn)
- 2 Canadian Mechanized Brigade Group (2 CMBG), Petawawa, Ontario
  - 2 Service Battalion (2 Svc Bn)
- 5 Canadian Mechanized Brigade Group (5 CMBG), Valcartier, Quebec
  - 5 Service Battalion (5 Svc Bn)

Historically, 3 Service Battalion was located at CFB Gagetown, New Brunswick, in support of 3 CIBG until disbanded in the early 1970s. 3 Svc Bn served as the "experimental service battalion" from 1963, when brigade-level combat service support resources were pooled under a single commanding officer and headquarters. This model has served the Canadian Army, albeit with some changes, since being adopted by the other brigades in 1968. Based in the Federal Republic of Germany, 4 Service Battalion was created at CFB Soest in 1968 and moved to CFB Lahr in 1970 in support of 4 CMBG until the close-out of Canada's NATO commitment there in 1993.

Service battalions were historically part of mechanized brigade groups, but were transferred to area support groups (ASG) in the late 1990s. In 2013, ASGs were renamed division support groups, and the service battalions were returned from these formations to the brigades. On 1 April 2010, the army reserve service battalions were modernized and aligned to represent the brigade group they were part of and to which they provide the combat service support (logistic and maintenance). Though the number of units was reduced from 19 to 10, the overall strength increased in-line with their role, the provision of combat support, logistic and maintenance resources to their respective brigade groups.

=== Reserve Force ===
- 31 Canadian Brigade Group London, Ontario
  - 31 Service Battalion, amalgamation of the 21 (Windsor), 22 (London), and 23 (Hamilton) service battalions
- 32 Canadian Brigade Group, Toronto, (Ontario)
  - 32 Service Battalion, former 25 (Toronto) Service Battalion
- 33 Canadian Brigade Group, Ottawa, (Ontario)
  - 33 Service Battalion, amalgamation of the 26 (North Bay) and 28 (Ottawa) service battalions
- 34 Canadian Brigade Group, Montreal, (Quebec)
  - 34 Service Battalion, former 51 (Montreal) Service Battalion
- 35 Canadian Brigade Group, Quebec City, (Quebec)
  - 35 Service Battalion, amalgamation of the 52 (Sherbrooke) and 55 (Quebec City) service battalions
- 36 Canadian Brigade Group, Halifax, (Nova Scotia)
  - 36 Service Battalion, amalgamation of the 33 (Halifax) and 35 (Sydney) service battalions
- 37 Canadian Brigade Group, Moncton, (New Brunswick)
  - 37 Service Battalion, amalgamation of the 31 (Saint John), 32 (Moncton), and 36 (Newfoundland) service battalions
- 38 Canadian Brigade Group, Winnipeg, (Manitoba)
  - 38 Service Battalion, amalgamation of the 16 (Saskatchewan), 17 (Winnipeg), and 18 (Thunder Bay) service battalions
- 39 Canadian Brigade Group, Vancouver, (British Columbia)
  - 39 Service Battalion, amalgamation of 11 (Victoria) Service Battalion and 12 (Vancouver) Service Battalion
- 41 Canadian Brigade Group, Calgary, (Alberta)
  - 41 Service Battalion, amalgamation of 14 (Calgary) Service Battalion and 15 (Edmonton) Service Battalion

== Operational employment ==
Although Canadian service battalions were a product of the Cold War and were expected to operate as complete units in support of Canadian Army brigades and brigade groups in the field, since the September 11 terrorist attacks, the non-linear battlefield has meant a shift towards the provision of service support to ongoing operations, e.g. in Afghanistan being provided by National Support Elements, tailored to the task at hand and not necessarily formed of just one service battalion. Service battalions are now thus largely force-generation units, and provide essential support in garrison.

LCol John Conrad bleakly described the evolution of Canadian logistics in his book, What the Thunder Said: Reflections of a Canadian Officer in Kandahar. He deployed to Afghanistan with an establishment capped at 300 all-ranks that almost failed to fuel, fix and feed troops during Operation Medusa in the summer of 2006. The doctrine, he describes, was unprepared for the intensity of mobile 360° warfare. At one point the planners lost count of LAV III cannon ammunition just as the battle group was firing much more ammunition than any calculation tables predicted. He also wrote about his own command group hitting an improvised explosive device west of Kandahar City, conducted the response drills then summoning his administration clerk with mock gravity to draft CF52 General Allowance Claim to replace the underwear he soiled. Conrad's book is a surprising but rare glimpse inside the logistics function in battle.
