= 8th Air Defence Regiment =

- Active: 10 August 2026–Present
- Country: Canada
- Branch: Canadian Army (2026-Present)
- Size: Regiment
- Part of: 6th Canadian Combat Support Brigade (2026-Present)
- Garrison/HQ: Oromocto, New Brunswick
- Anniversaries: 10 August

Commanders
- Current commander: Lieutenant-Colonel Lisa Nodwell

The 8th Air Defence Regiment, Royal Canadian Artillery is a Canadian air defence regiment.

== History ==
The 8th Air Defence Regiment was formed on 10 August 2026 during a restructuring of the Canadian Armed Forces. The regiment was officially unveiled on 16 November 2026. The establishment of the regiment marks the first time in over a decade that the Canadian Army has a dedicated short-range air defence capability. The regiment is based in Oromocto, New Brunswick. The regiment is attached to the 6th Canadian Combat Support Brigade.
