= 6 Engineer Squadron =

- Active: 18 February 1911 – present
- Country: Canada
- Branch: Canadian Military Engineers; Primary Reserve
- Type: Combat Engineers
- Part of: 3rd Canadian Division; 39 Canadian Brigade Group; 39 Combat Engineer Regiment
- Regimental HQ: JP Fell Armoury; North Vancouver (city), British Columbia
- Motto: "Ubique"
- March: "Wings"
- Abbreviation: 6 ES

6 Engineer Squadron is a Primary Reserve Canadian Military Engineer unit of the Canadian Forces. 6 Engineer Squadron is part of the 39 Canadian Brigade Group (39 CBG), headquarters for all Primary Reserve units in British Columbia. 6 Engineer Squadron is a sub unit of 39 Combat Engineer Regiment.

6 Engineer Squadron is headquartered at the Lieutenant Colonel James Pemberton Fell Armoury in the city of North Vancouver, British Columbia.

On 3 May 2008, 6 Engineer Squadron, 44 Engineer Squadron in Trail, British Columbia and 54 Engineer Squadron in Chilliwack, British Columbia, joined to form 39 Combat Engineer Regiment (39 CER). 6 Field Engineer Squadron became 6 Engineer Squadron within 39 CER.

== Mission ==
6 Engineer Squadron's mission as a Canadian Military Engineering (CME) unit is to provide operational engineer support for the other units of 39 CBG, during domestic operations and provide individual augmenttees for overseas operations of the Canadian Forces. The unit is responsible for the construction of bridges and installations, demolition of obstacles, clearance of booby traps, mines and unexploded ordnance and general engineer support.

== History ==
6 Engineer Squadron was authorized by General Order on 18 February 1911 as the 6th Field Company Canadian Engineers. During the First World War the company remained in Canada where its primary function was to establish and operate an engineer training centre. The first draft left North Vancouver on 26 August 1914 and contained many of the original unit members, including the unit's first commanding officer, Major James Pemberton Fell. Over the next four years the unit trained, and dispatched for overseas service 3670 soldiers. Of the original unit members and graduates of their training programs 210 died on active duty. The majority of these men saw service on the Western Front, but a small contingent of 34 was also sent to Siberia in 1918. The unit also provided numerous work parties constructing military structures and defences in British Columbia as well as providing the crews for the searchlights in Esquimalt Harbour. On 30 December 1918, at the end of the First World War, the unit was temporarily disbanded.

The unit was reorganized on 30 July 1921. In the mid-1930s the unit was renamed the 6th Field Company Royal Canadian Engineers. It was mobilized on 1 September 1939 and initially tasked with a number of military construction projects in British Columbia.

In August 1940, the unit was sent to Camp Debert in Nova Scotia where it joined the other engineer units of the 3rd Canadian Infantry Division (3rd CID)in constructing the camp. Once the camp was complete they were joined by the rest of the divisional troops. In the spring of 1941 they sailed for England where they spent the rest of 1941 building more camps and the next two years on assault training and on field exercises.

On 6 June 1944 the unit landed with the 3rd CID as part of Operation Overlord, the Allied invasion of German-occupied Europe. Their 2nd platoon landed in the first wave and sustained over 50% casualties. The Company remained in support of the 3rd CID for the rest of the war seeing action during the clearing of the Channel ports, the Battle of the Scheldt, the Rhine Crossings and the final Liberation of the Netherlands. The majority of this work consisted of the construction of bailey bridges and the clearance of mines and boobytraps. On 4 May 1945 the unit was preparing for an attack on the town of Aurlich when they received the ceasefire order ending the war. By this time 30 unit members had been killed due to enemy action. Elements of the unit remained in Europe for nearly a year, rebuilding and repairing roads and bridges damaged or destroyed during the war, with the last of their troops leaving Germany on 21 April 1946.

The Company returned to its armoury in North Vancouver and was redesignated as 6th Field Squadron Royal Canadian Engineers in 1946 and became part of the 7th Field Engineer Regiment (7FER). In the 1960s, 7 FER was disbanded and 6 Field Squadron became an independent unit once more and its name was changed to 6 Field Engineer Squadron.

Starting in 1969 the unit began supplying individual augmentees to NATO and the UN. Unit members have since served in Egypt, Israel, Germany, Syria, Jordan, Lebanon, Croatia, Bosnia and Afghanistan. During the summer of 2008 eight unit members were on active duty in Afghanistan.

== Lt. Col. James Pemberton Fell Armoury ==
Site	Date(s)	Designated	Location	Description	Image
Lt. Col. James Pemberton Fell Armoury	1914	Recognized – 1988 on the Register of the Government of Canada Heritage Buildings	North Vancouver, British Columbia	large centrally located building with a low-pitched gable roof adjacent to a residential area and Mahon Park. The Armoury was named for LCol Fell in 1986; he was the first Commanding Officer of 6th Field Company when it was formed in 1911. There is a 6th Field Engineer Museum in the Lt Col James Pemberton Fell Armoury; Lt Col James Pemberton Fell was the first Commanding Officer of 6th Field Company, CE when it was formed in 1911	

== 6th Field Engineer Squadron Museum ==
6th Field Engineer Squadron Museum
- Established: 2008
- Location: JP Fell Armoury, North Vancouver BC
- Website: http://39cer-museum.net

The mission of the museum is to collect, preserve, research and photograph material relating to the history of the 6 Engineer Squadron, its former members and its site, and, through the appropriate display of such items, to convey this history to the currently serving members, the broader Canadian Forces community and the public. The museum is affiliated with: CMA, CHIN, OMMC and Virtual Museum of Canada.

== Cadet Units ==
There are four Royal Canadian Army Cadets units across British Columbia which are affiliated to the 6 Engineer Squadron. Cadets are not soldiers; they are part of an organization dedicated to developing citizenship and leadership among young men and women aged 12 to 18 years of age with a military flavour, and are not required to join the Canadian Forces.

Corps	Location
2573 RCACC	North Vancouver
3067 RCACC	Lillooet

Cadet units affiliated to the 6 Engineer Squadron receive support and also are entitled to wear traditional regimental accouterments on their uniforms.

== See also ==
- Canadian Forces
- Canadian Military Engineers
- 3rd Canadian Division
- 39 Canadian Brigade Group
