= 39 Signal Regiment =

39 Signal Regiment may refer to:

- 39 (Skinners) Signal Regiment, a British military unit
- 39 Signal Regiment (Canada), a Canadian military unit
