= 39 Service Battalion =

- 39^{e} Bataillon des services (French)
- Active: 2010–present
- Country: Canada
- Branch: Canadian Army Primary Reserve
- Type: Service battalion (combat service support)
- Role: Combat service support
- Size: 4 companies
- Part of: 39 Canadian Brigade Group
- Garrison/HQ: Richmond, British Columbia
- Motto: Concordia victrix (Latin for 'A good spirit conquers')
- Website: canada.ca/en/army/corporate/3-canadian-division/39-service-battalion.html

Commanders
- Commanding officer: LCol A.M. Foort, CD
- Regimental Sergeant Major: CWO M. Bergan, CD
- Abbreviation: 39 Svc Bn

39 Service Battalion (39 Svc Bn; French: 39^{e} Bataillon des services) is a Canadian Army Primary Reserve combat service support unit of the Canadian Forces that can fight in a defensive role and provides both logistical and army engineering maintenance support to the units within 3rd Canadian Division's 39 Canadian Brigade Group, which consists of all Primary Reserve army units in British Columbia.

== History ==
Prior to 2010, 39 Canadian Brigade Group (39 CBG), which is the headquarters responsible for all Primary Reserve army units in British Columbia, had two individual service battalions under its chain of command. The two individual service battalions were 11 (Victoria) Service Battalion and 12 (Vancouver) Service Battalion. Canadians can join the reserve at age 16, with part-time and full-time employment being offered to battalion members until the age of 60.

In April 2010, the two individual service battalions in 39 Canadian Brigade Group were amalgamated into the two companies that make up the new 39 Service Battalion, which is now one of Canada's largest reserve units with approximately 200 reserve soldiers and 40 regular force members. The 39 Service Battalion has a strategic partnership with the Army National Guard Forces and has held joint training exercises with the Arizona National Guard.

The battalion has been a recipient of the Rigby Cup Award for Top Cadet Army Cadet Corps in Canada in 2016, 2018, and 2019. The 39 Service Battalion is frequently called upon in times of natural disasters, such as 2013's flooding in southern Alberta, and the 2016 wildfire at Fort McMurray.

== Current structure ==
39 Service Battalion is composed of four companies.

- Administration Company in Richmond
- 11 (Victoria) Company (11 Coy) in Victoria
- 12 (Vancouver) Company (12 Coy) in Richmond, with a detachment at Chilliwack
- Technical Services Company (Tech Svcs Coy) in Richmond, with a detachment at Chilliwack

== See also ==
- Royal Canadian Logistics Service
- Corps of Royal Canadian Electrical and Mechanical Engineers
