= 39 Combat Engineer Regiment =

- Active: 3 May 2008 - Present
- Country: Canada
- Branch: Royal Canadian Engineers Primary Reserve (Militia)
- Type: Combat Engineers
- Part of: 3rd Canadian Division 39 Canadian Brigade Group
- Garrison/HQ: RHQ - Chilliwack 6 FES - North Vancouver; 44 FES - Trail 54 FES - Chilliwack
- Motto(s): "Ubique"
- March: "Wings"
- Abbreviation: 39 CER

39 Combat Engineer Regiment (39 CER) was created on 3 May 2008 and amalgamated all the independent field engineer squadrons of the 39 Canadian Brigade Group in British Columbia.

39 CER is part of 3rd Canadian Division's (formerly LFWA's) 39 Canadian Brigade Group (39 CBG).

== Sub-units ==
When the regiment was formed, it combined the existing independent field engineer squadrons and made them sub-units of 39 CER.

- 6 Engineer Squadron (North Vancouver)
- 44 Engineer Squadron (Trail, British Columbia & Cranbrook, British Columbia)
- 54 Engineer Squadron (Chilliwack)

== Cadets ==
There are four Royal Canadian Army Cadets units spread across southern part of British Columbia which are affiliated to the 39 Combat Engineer Regiment. Cadets are not soldiers, nor are they expected to become soldiers; they are part of an organization dedicated to developing citizenship and leadership among young men and women aged 12 to 18 years of age with a military flavour, and are not required to join the Canadian Forces at any time.

Corps	Location
1746 44 ES RCACC	Creston, BC
1725 54 ES RCACC	Chilliwack, BC
2573 6 ES RCACC	North Vancouver, BC
3067 6 ES RCACC	Lillooet, BC

Cadet units affiliated with the 39 CER combat units receive some support and are entitled to wear traditional regimental accoutrements on their uniforms at the corps expense.

== Order of precedence ==
Preceded by 38 Combat Engineer Regiment	39 Combat Engineer Regiment	Succeeded by 41 Combat Engineer Regiment of Canadian Military Engineers

== See also ==
- Military history of Canada
- History of the Canadian Army
- Canadian Forces
- List of armouries in Canada
