= 4th Artillery Regiment (General Support), RCA =

- 4^{e} Régiment d'artillerie (Appui général), ARC (French)
- Active: 1987–present
- Country: Canada
- Branch: Canadian Army
- Type: Artillery
- Role: General support
- Size: 4 batteries
- Part of: Royal Canadian Artillery; 6 Canadian Combat Support Brigade
- Garrison/HQ: CFB Gagetown
- Mottos: Ubique (Latin for 'everywhere'); Quo fas et gloria ducunt (Latin for 'whither right and glory lead')
- March: Slow march: "Royal Artillery Slow March"; Quick march: "British Grenadiers"
- Equipment: CU172 Blackjack
- Engagements: Second World War; Afghanistan
- Battle honours: Ubique (Latin for 'everywhere')
- Website: canada.ca/en/army/corporate/5-canadian-division/4-artillery-regiment.html

The 4th Artillery Regiment (General Support), Royal Canadian Artillery, provides the Canadian Army critical warfighting capabilities, including medium-range radars and CU172 Blackjack uncrewed air vehicles. The unit is based at CFB Gagetown, where it is part of the 6 Canadian Combat Support Brigade.

== Batteries ==
- 127th Battery
- 128th Battery
- 129th Battery
- Headquarters and Services Battery

== History ==
=== Cold War ===
On November 27, 1987, the 4th Air Defence Regiment, RCA, was formed at CFB Lahr to support the 4 Canadian Mechanized Brigade Group from two batteries already stationed in Germany (128/129). The 119th (CFB Chatham, New Brunswick), 129th AAD Battery (CFB Lahr) and 128th AAD Battery (CFB Baden–Soellingen, West Germany) were combined, forming the 4th AD Regiment consisting of 119th, 128th, and 129th AD Batteries. These units were renamed from "airfield air defence" to "air defence" at this time also and provided support the 1st Canadian Division's operations, as well of support for the two Canadian airbases in Germany. Following the major growth of the regiment's service requirements the Headquarters and Services Battery was established in 1990.

In 1992, the Canadian government released the final version of Canadian Forces Force Reduction Plan. The 4th AD Regiment was reduced in size. By mid-1992 it had been reduced to nil strength. On February 5, 1993, the regiment was disbanded. The 119th Air Defence Battery became independent and Canada's only active air defence unit.

=== Reformation ===
On March 15, 1995, the 4th Air Defence Regiment was reactivated as part of the Canadian Army Reserve Force. It was staffed by mixture of regular force members and reservists. The elements of the regiment deployed as part of the Canada's commitment to Afghanistan to support aerospace coordination centres. In 2011, the 127th Battery was re-established as a copy of the 119th and 128th Batteries.

In 2014 the regiment was renamed to the 4th Artillery Regiment (General Support), RCA. This was to reflected the regiment's capabilities moving away from air defence. The 119th Battery was renamed to the 129th Battery. The regiment uses medium-range radars and CU‑172 Blackjack unmanned aerial vehicles to provide mechanized brigade groups with aerospace coordination centres.
