= 6th Canadian Combat Support Brigade =

Canadian military engineer unit

- 6^{e} Brigade d’appui au combat du Canada
- Active: 1 April 2018–present
- Country: Canada
- Branch: Canadian Army
- Type: Brigade group
- Role: Combat support
- Size: Five units
- Part of: 5th Canadian Division (2018-2026); 1st Canadian Division (2026-Present)
- Garrison/HQ: CFB Kingston
- Motto: Totum aciei spatium (Latin for 'the entire battle space')
- Anniversaries: April 1
- Website: canada.ca/en/army/corporate/5-canadian-division/6-canadian-combat-support-brigade.html

Commanders
- Commanding officer: Colonel Frédéric Pruneau, CD
- Regimental sergeant major: CWO Dave R. Limon, CD

6th Canadian Combat Support Brigade (French: 6^{e} Brigade d’appui au combat du Canada) (6 CCSB) is a Canadian Forces combat support brigade that is part of 1st Canadian Division of the Canadian Army. It is spread out over different bases in Canada but the headquarters is at CFB Kingston.

== Units ==
Structure of the 6 CCSB

4th Artillery Regiment (General Support), RCA	Royal Canadian Artillery	CFB Gagetown
4 Engineer Support Regiment	Royal Canadian Engineers	CFB Gagetown
21 Electronic Warfare Regiment	Royal Canadian Corps of Signals	CFB Kingston
Canadian Army Intelligence Regiment	Canadian Intelligence Corps	CFB Kingston
Influence Activities Task Force		CFB Kingston
6 Tactical Civil-Military Cooperation Company		CFB Kingston

== History ==
6 CCSB was created in April 2018. The formation's goal is to generate professional and specialized forces that can provide sustained, scalable and coordinated combat support enablers and effects to any operation. 6 CCSB is a mixed team of Regular Force and Primary Reserve soldiers, supported by civilians, who operate alongside whole-of-government colleagues, non-governmental agencies, and coalition partners to support Canadian Armed Forces missions.

Initially part of 5th Canadian Division, the brigade was reallocated to 1st Canadian Division in September 2026, part of large reorganiztion and modernization of the Canadian Army.

Unlike the other Regular Force brigades (1, 2 and 5 Canadian Mechanized Brigade Group) 6 CCSB is not a mechanized brigade, nor will it fight on its own or be involved as a main combat entity.

== See also ==
- Military history of Canada
- History of the Canadian Army
- Canadian Forces
