= 1st Canadian Sustainment Brigade =

- Active: 10 September 2026–Present
- Country: Canada
- Branch: Canadian Army (2026-Present)
- Type: Support Brigade
- Role: Logistical support Maintenance support
- Size: Brigade
- Part of: 1st Canadian Division (2026-Present)

The 1st Canadian Sustainment Brigade is a brigade of the Canadian Army

== History ==
The 1st Canadian Sustainment Brigade was formed on 10 September 2026 during a restructuring of the Canadian Armed Forces. It is attached to the 1st Canadian Division. The purpose of the brigade is to provide logistical and maintenance support at a divisional level.
