= 39 Signal Regiment (Canada) =

- 39^{e} Régiment des transmissions
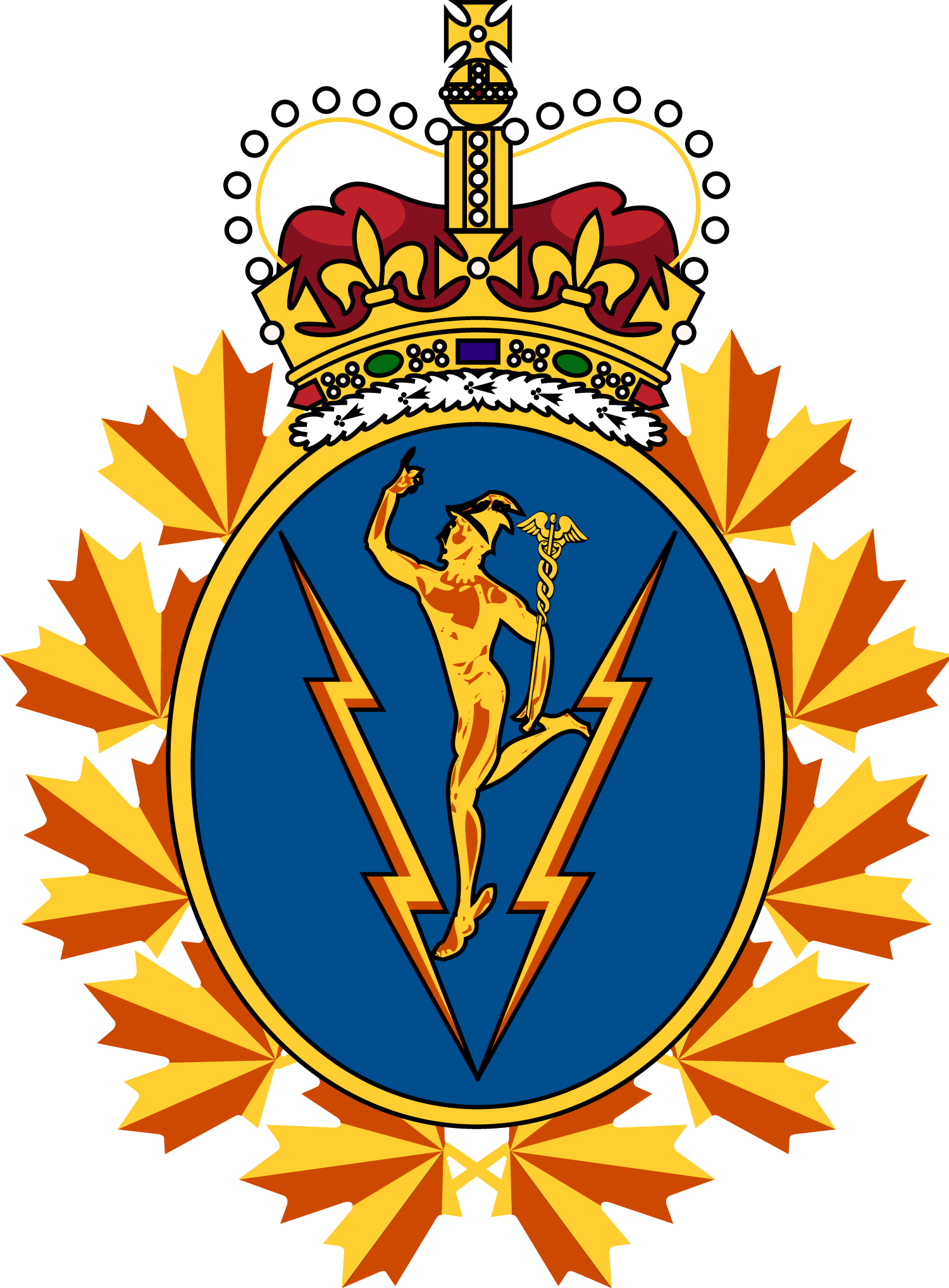
- C&E Branch badge
- Active: 2011–present
- Country: Canada
- Branch: Canadian Army
- Role: Military communications
- Part of: 39 Canadian Brigade Group
- Garrison/HQ: Headquarters Squadron: Vancouver; A Squadron: Vancouver; B Squadron: Victoria and Nanaimo; C Squadron: Kelowna
- Website: army-armee.forces.gc.ca/en/3-canadian-division/39-signal-regiment/index.page

Commanders
- Commanding officer: Lieutenant-Colonel D.V. Ferg
- Regimental sergeant major: Chief Warrant Officer D.F.M. MacKinnon

39 Signal Regiment, formerly known as 744 Signal Regiment in Vancouver, 741 Signal Squadron in Esquimalt and 748 Signal Squadron in Nanaimo, is a Primary Reserve Canadian Army unit of the Royal Canadian Corps of Signals (part of the Communications and Electronics Branch) in Vancouver, Victoria and Nanaimo, British Columbia.

== Location ==
The unit consists of four squadrons (A Squadron in Vancouver, B Squadron on Vancouver Island and C Squadron in Kelowna) along with Headquarters Squadron at the MGen B.M. Hoffmeister Building (named after Bert Hoffmeister), Vancouver.

== History ==
- No. 11 Section authorized in Victoria 4 June 1913
- Redesignated No. 11 (Fortress) Signal Company 15 April 1920
- Redesignated No. 11 Fortress Signal Company 1 April 1936
- Redesignated No. 11 (Reserve) Fortress Signal Company 1 January 1941
- Redesignated No. 5 Area Signal Company 1 April 1946
- Amalgamated with No. 3 Area Signal Company and No. 4 Area Signal Company to form the West Coast Signal Regiment 1 October 1946
- West Coast Signal Regiment (less No. 3 Area Signal Squadron) reduced to nil strength 28 February 1965
- No 3 Area Signal Squadron, West Coast Signal Regiment, redesignation to 744 (Vancouver) Communication Squadron authorized 1 April 1970
- Redesignated 744 (Vancouver) Communication Regiment / 744^{e} Régiment des communications (Vancouver) 4 July 1978
- Amalgamated with 741 (Victoria) Communication Squadron / 741^{e} Escadron des communications (Victoria) and 748 (Nanaimo) Communication Squadron / 748^{e} Escadron des communications (Nanaimo) and redesignated 39 Signals Regiment / 39^{e} Régiment des transmissions 26 July 2011
- Redesignated 39 Signal Regiment / 39^{e} Régiment des transmissions 9 March 2012

== Role ==
39 Signal Regiment specializes in tactical and strategic communication, employing voice, electronic and telecommunication systems. Their mandate is to provide individual and collective support to Canadian Forces operations, both domestic and international. Many of their members have served in various UN and NATO peacekeeping missions around the world. This unit also provides communication support to the Army Reserve. Some units in the Communication Reserve also provide manning support to the Navy Transportable Tactical Command Centres.

== Deployments ==
Members of the regiment have deployed on several operations including:

International:

- Operation Aegis – Canadian Armed Forces' (CAF) contribution to the Government of Canada's effort to evacuate Afghans with significant and/or enduring relationship with the Government of Canada, along with their accompanying family members. July to August 2021.
- Operation Apollo – Operations in support of the United States in its military operations in Afghanistan. The operation took place from October 2001 to October 2003
- Operation Archer – Since July 2005 to July 2006, Canada's participation in Operation Enduring Freedom in Afghanistan has been conducted under Operation Archer
- Operation Amarna - Replaces Ops ARTEMIS and IMPACT as part of Canada’s contribution to strengthening peace and security in the Middle East.
- Operation Athena – Canadian deployment with the International Security Assistance Force in Afghanistan
- Operation Attention – Canadian deployment with NATO Training Mission in Afghanistan
- Operation Calumet - CAF role in the Multinational Force and Observers (MFO) in the Sinai Peninsula of Egypt.
- Operation Harmony – Support to the United Nations Protection Force (UNPROFOR) in Croatia
- Operation Impact – Canada's contribution to the US-led international coalition against ISIS.
- Operation Kinetic – Contribution to Kosovo Force (KFOR), the NATO peacekeeping force that operated in Kosovo and the Republic of Macedonia from June 1999 to June 2000
- Operation Reassurance – Deployment in Central and Eastern Europe as part of NATO reassurance measures.
- Operation Unifier – Contribution to support Ukrainian forces through capacity building, in coordination with the U.S. and other countries providing similar training assistance.

Domestic:

- Operation Cadence – Security for the 2018 G7 summit held in Quebec & 2024 G7 summit held in Alberta
- Operation Laser – Domestic response to the COVID-19 pandemic.
- Operation Lentus – Contingency plan that outlines the joint response to provide support for humanitarian assistance and disaster response (HADR) to provincial and territorial authorities in the case of a major natural disaster that overwhelms their capacity to respond.
- Operation Nanook – To assert Canada's sovereignty over its northernmost regions, to enhance the Canadian Armed Forces' ability to operate in Arctic conditions, to improve coordination in whole-of-government operations, and to maintain interoperability with mission partners for maximum effectiveness in response to safety and security issues in the North
- Operation Podium – Vancouver 2010 Olympic and Paralympic Winter Games
- Operation Peregrine - British Columbia 2003 wildfires deployed to support Emergency Management BC and BC Forest Service in response to six major interface fires in Barrier, Okanagan Falls, Chase, Maclure and Kelowna
- Operation Noble Eagle – NORAD CANR communications support post-9/11, 2001. As the Canadian geographical component of NORAD, CANR provides airspace surveillance and control, and directs all air sovereignty activities for the Canadian NORAD Region. CANR and its assigned air force assets throughout the country ensure air safety and security against potential air threats and have supported special events such as the G-8 Summit and the visits of foreign dignitaries.
- Operation Abacus – Y2K Canadian computer rollover response 1999
- Operation Reconfiguration – 1999 migration of CF most C&C systems from Banyan VINES to Windows prior to Y2K
- Operation Pyramid – Victoria heavy snowfall (100 cm) 1996
- Operation Pope Canadian – Pope John Paul II Canadian visit, Vancouver, September 1984

== Occupations ==
Subunits of the regiment

39 Signal Regiment primarily employs the following occupations in the Canadian Army, among others:

- Signal operator
- Line technician
- Signal technician
- Information systems technician
- Supply technician
- Human resources administrator
- Finance services administrator
- Mobile support equipment operator
- Signals officer

== Training ==
Training is a year-round activity and soldiers are expected to attend up to two weekend training activities per month. Once fully trained, soldiers can apply for various full-time and part-time employment opportunities available throughout the year.
