= 21 Electronic Warfare Regiment =

- 21^{e} Régiment de guerre électronique
- Regimental badge
- Active: 2010–present
- Country: Canada
- Branch: Canadian Army
- Role: Electronic warfare
- Size: 4 squadrons
- Part of: 6th Canadian Combat Support Brigade
- Garrison/HQ: CFB Kingston, Ontario
- Mottos: Inveni et usurpa (Latin for 'find and exploit')
- Engagements: War in Iraq (2013–2017): Battle of Mosul
- Website: www.canada.ca/en/army/corporate/5-canadian-division/21-electronic-warfare-regiment.html

Commanders
- Commanding officer: Lieutenant-Colonel N. Lentzakis
- Regimental sergeant major: Chief Warrant Officer Bruce W.C. Mercer

21 Electronic Warfare Regiment (French: 21^{e} Régiment de guerre électronique) is a Royal Canadian Corps of Signals regiment in the Canadian Army, based at CFB Kingston, Ontario. 21 EW Regt exists to provide trained army electronic warfare operators and support personnel to the Canadian Armed Forces. 214 Electronic Warfare Squadron is the only Reserve electronic warfare squadron within the Canadian Armed Forces that is a part of a Regular Force regiment. Many of its members serve in various UN and NATO peacekeeping missions around the world.

== History ==
The regiment was formed in 2010. The regiment participated in the Battle of Mosul where it intercepted, deciphered and jammed ISIL communications. In 2018, the regiment became attached to the 6 Canadian Combat Support Brigade. The regiment later was deployed in Latvia where it instructed NATO allies and other Canadian units in electronic warfare. On 13 January 2025, the construction of a new garrison for the regiment began. It is set to become operational in 2028.

== Structure ==
The regiment includes:

- 212 Electronic Warfare Squadron (Regular)
- 214 Electronic Warfare Squadron (Reserve)
- 215 Electronic Warfare Squadron (Regular)
- 218 Combat Service Support Squadron (Regular)
- Regimental Headquarters (Regular)

== Occupations ==
21 Electronic Warfare Regiment primarily employs the following occupations in the Canadian Army, among others:

- Signal Officer (00341 SIGS)
- Intelligence Officer (0082 INT)
- Intelligence Operator (00111 INT OP)
- Signals Intelligence Specialist (00120 SIGINT SPEC)
- Signal Operator (00362 SIG OP)
- Signal Technician (00385 SIG TECH)
- Information System Technician (00394 IST)
