= 4 Engineer Support Regiment =

Canadian military unit

- 4^{e} Régiment d'appui du génie (French)
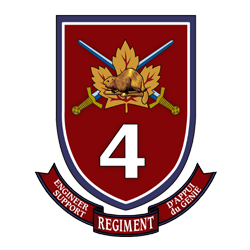
- Active: 1977–present
- Country: Canada
- Branch: Canadian Army
- Type: Engineering support
- Size: Four squadrons. 450 pers (approx)
- Part of: 6 Canadian Combat Support Brigade
- Garrison/HQ: 5 CDSB Gagetown
- Website: https://www.canada.ca/en/army/corporate/5-canadian-division/4-engineer-support-regiment.html

Commanders
- Commanding officer: LCol Blaise Lapointe, CD
- Previous commanding officer: LCol Ian Summerfield, CD
- Deputy commanding officer: Maj Gabriel Beauchamp, CD
- Regimental sergeant major: CWO Rodger Gilbert, CD
- Adjutant: Capt Andrew Charter

Insignia
- NATO Map Symbol
- Abbreviation: 4 ESR

4 Engineer Support Regiment (French: 4^{e} Régiment d'appui du génie) is a regiment of the Canadian Military Engineers headquartered at CFB Gagetown, New Brunswick. It is tasked to provide general engineer support to the whole of the Canadian Armed Forces.

4 ESR was officially formed in 1993 when 4 Combat Engineer Regiment (4 CER) returned from CFB Lahr in Germany when 4 Canadian Mechanized Brigade Group was stood down. 4 CER absorbed 22 Field Squadron, a detached and independent unit affiliated with 2 Combat Engineer Regiment. 22 Field Squadron was stationed in CFB Gagetown supporting the 2nd Battalion The Royal Canadian Regiment Battle Group, the Combat Training Centre and 4 CER in Germany.

On 1 June 2022, the perpetuation of No. 2 Construction Battalion of the First World War Canadian Expeditionary Force was assigned to the Canadian Military Engineers, with 4 Engineer Support Regiment being responsible for ongoing public recognition of the perpetuation.

== Lineage ==
=== 4 Engineer Support Regiment ===
- Originated on 17 June 1977, in Lahr, Germany, as 4 Combat Engineer Regiment.
- Redesignated on 4 September 1992, as 4th Engineer Support Regiment.
- Redesignated on 30 September 1993, as 4 Engineer Support Regiment.

=== 4 Field Engineer Squadron ===
- Originated on 1 August 1951, in Petawawa, Ontario, as 59th Independent Field Squadron, RCE.
- Redesignated on 16 October 1953, as 4th Field Squadron, RCE.
- Redesignated on 30 April 1958, as 4 Field Squadron.
- Redesignated on 21 May 1975, as 4 Field Engineer Squadron.
- Reorganized as a regiment on 17 June 1977, and Designated as 4 Combat Engineer Regiment.

== Sub-units ==
As of 2025 the unit consists of:

- Regimental Headquarters
- 42 Field Squadron
  - 21 Field Troop
  - 22 Field Troop
- 43 Counter Explosive Threat Squadron
  - 31 Search Troop
  - 32 Explosive Ordinance Disposal Troop
- 45 Support Squadron
  - 51 Heavy Equipment Troop
  - 52 Resource Troop
  - 53 Construction Troop
- 48 Combat Service Support Squadron
  - Logistics Troop
  - Maintenance Troop

== See also ==
- Military history of Canada
- History of the Canadian Army

== Order of precedence ==
Preceded by 2 Combat Engineer Regiment	4 Engineer Support Regiment	Succeeded by 5 Combat Engineer Regiment
