= 5 Combat Engineer Regiment =

Canadian military engineer unit

- 5^{e} Régiment de Génie de Combat (French)
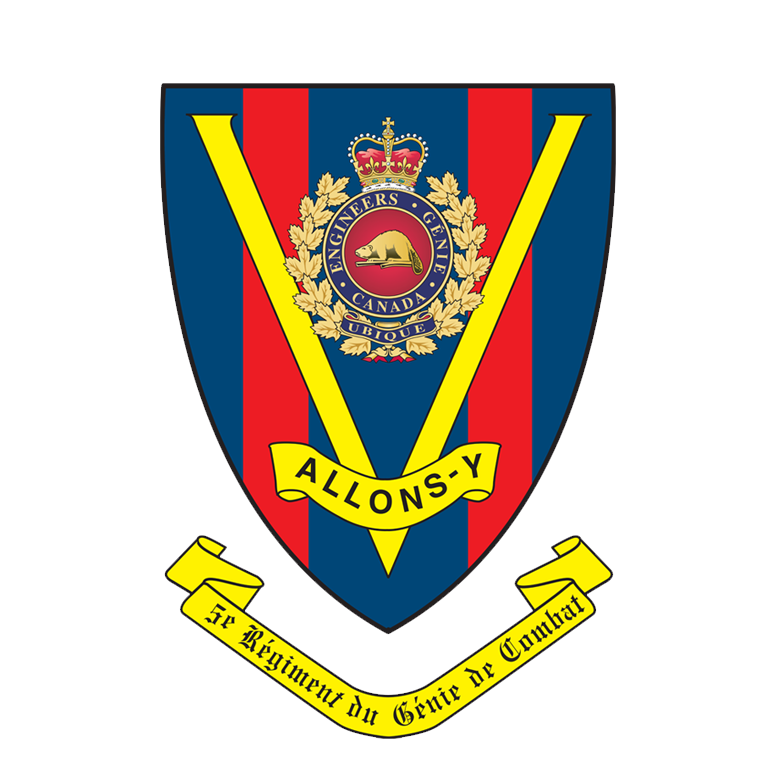
- Crest of 5 Combat Engineer Regiment of the Canadian Army
- Active: 1977–present
- Country: Canada
- Branch: Canadian Army
- Type: Military engineers
- Role: Combat engineers
- Size: Five squadrons. 550 pers (approx)
- Part of: 5 Canadian Mechanized Brigade Group
- Garrison/HQ: 2 CDSB Valcartier
- Motto: Ubique (everywhere)
- Website: https://www.canada.ca/en/army/corporate/2-canadian-division/5-combat-engineer-regiment.html

Commanders
- Commanding Officer: LCol J. Martineau, CD
- Regimental Sergeant Major: CWO N. Côté, MMM, MSM, CD

Insignia
- NATO Map Symbol

5 Combat Engineer Regiment (French: 5^{e} Régiment du genie de combat) is a regular combat engineer unit of the Canadian Forces stationed at Canadian Forces Base Valcartier in Quebec. 5 CER is the only Canadian combat engineer regiment operating in French. The mission of 5 CER is to provide combat engineer support to the formation or task force created by 5 Canadian Mechanized Brigade Group.

Organized into five squadrons, it offers versatile support, covering all military engineering specialties. 5 CER has two field engineer squadrons and one light engineer squadron. The support squadron handles heavy equipment tasks such as bridge components and reverse osmosis water purification systems, as well as a combat diver section and an explosive ordnance disposal troop. The administration squadron coordinates logistics, geomatic and commands the regiment.

- 51 Field Engineers Squadron (French: 51^{e} Escadron du génie de combat)
- 52 Field Engineers Squadron (French: 52^{e} Escadron du génie de combat)
- 53 Light Field Squadron (French: 53^{e} Escadron du génie de combat)
- 55 Support Squadron (French: 55^{e} Escadron d'Appui)
- 58 Administration Squadron (French: 58^{e} Escadron de Commandement et Service)

== History ==
The unit was created as the 5th Engineer Squadron of Canada on July 1, 1968. Its first commanding officer was Major R.G. Bryan, and he had a staff of 38 under his command. The tasks of this period were the construction of the Cadieux bridge and the road of the same name as well as the beginning of the construction of the Bouchard bridge. In 1970, under the commandement by Major P.E. Corbeil, the unit worked to develop the training area at the Valcartier base. Between the 1970 and 1975, the Squadron participated in the construction of airstrips in the Canadian North, notably at Pond Inlet and Cape Dorset. In 1975, it was renamed the "5th Field Engineer Squadron". The Regiment finally received the designation of "5th Engineer Regiment" in 1977.

== Buildings ==
Under the command of Major Corbeil, on December 4, 1971, the unit inaugurated its new home, Building 323.

In 2018 under Lieutenant-Colonel S. Neveu, CD, the construction of a new building to replace the aging one began. The project came to an end in January 2021 under the command of Lieutenant-Colonel J. Patry, CD, and the regiment officially moved to its new premises in building 294. In the summer of 2021 building 323 was officially demolished.

== Operations and Deployments ==
=== National ===
At the national level, the regiment participated in Operations GLACE INFINIE in Drummondville in 1991, Operation SAGUENAY in Saguenay-Lac-Saint-Jean during the 1996 flood, Operation RECUPERATION during the 1998 ice storm in Montreal and Montérégie and PERSISTANCE in Nova Scotia. In addition, the regiment has been involved in most of the Operations Lentus on the territory of the 2nd Canadian Division including the floods of 2011, 2017 and 2019.

=== International ===
The first deployment outside Canada took place as part of Operation GREYBEARD from March to July 1983 in Cyprus. The Regiment was deploy again to Cyprus in October 1987 in support of the 5th Light Artillery Regiment of Canada. 5 CER took part in operations: RECORD in Kuwait in 1991, CAVALIER in former Yugoslavia between 1992 and 1995, HARMONY in Croatia in 1993 and 1995, ALLIANCE in Bosnia in 1996, STABLE in Haiti in 1996, PALLADIUM ROTO 5, 9, 10 and 14 in Bosnia from 1998 to 2003, PRUDENCE in the Central African Republic in 1999, TORRENT in Turkey in 1999, TOUCAN in East Timor in 1999 and HESTIA in Haiti following the earthquake 2010. Operation IMPACT as engineer instructors and advisers to train the Iraqi armed forces between 2018 and 2022.

5 CER was also heavily involved in Afghanistan, among other things on Operation ATHENA in 2003, 2007 and 2009 during Canada's participation in the International Security and Assistance Force.

5 CER had six soldiers killed in Afghanistan.

Since 2014, Canada has provided assistance and training to Ukraine with Operation UNIFIER on which members of the regiment have been involved. In 2021 the Commanding Officer of the 5 Combat Engineer Regiment, Lieutenant-Colonel L. Gilbert, CD, assumed command of Operation UNIFIER for Rotation 11. Members of 5 CER take part in Operation REASSURANCE in Latvia. They are there as part of NATO assurance and deterrence measures. These measures are intended to strengthen NATO's collective defence. As part of this operation, the Canadian Armed Forces conduct training, exercises, and specific NATO tasks.

== See also ==
- Military history of Canada
- History of the Canadian Army
- Canadian Forces
- List of armouries in Canada

== Order of precedence ==
Preceded by 4 Engineer Support Regiment	5 Combat Engineer Regiment	Succeeded by 31 Combat Engineer Regiment (The Elgins) of Canadian Military Engineers
