= 12 (Vancouver) Service Company =

Coordinates: 49.176275°N 123.112561°W

- Active: 15 February 1965–present
- Country: Canada
- Branch: Canadian Army
- Type: Combat service support
- Part of: 39 Service Battalion
- Garrison/HQ: Colonel Sherman Armoury, Richmond, British Columbia
- Motto: Duty above all
- March: "Duty Above All"

Commanders
- Commanding officer: LCol A. Foort, CD
- Regimental sergeant major: CWO M. Bergan, CD
- Officer commanding 12 Coy: Maj T. Ng, CD
- Company sergeant major: WO S. Liu, CD
- Abbreviation: 12 Svc Coy

12 (Vancouver) Service Company (12 Svc Coy) is a Canadian Army Primary Reserve combat service support subunit of the Canadian Forces that can fight in a defensive role and provides logistical support to the units within 3rd Canadian Division's 39 Canadian Brigade Group, which consists of all Primary Reserve units in British Columbia.

== Service battalion background ==
In Canada, service battalions were originally created from many corps that were once part the Canadian Forces. The units which were amalgamated to form service battalions were:

- Royal Canadian Army Service Corps (RCASC)
- Royal Canadian Ordnance Corps (RCOC)
- Royal Canadian Electrical and Mechanical Engineers (RCEME)
- Royal Canadian Army Pay Corps (RCAPC)
- Canadian Provost Corps (C Pro C)
- Canadian Intelligence Corps
- Canadian Women's Army Corps (CWAC)

== Battalion history ==
12 Service Battalion Flag

No. 12 (Vancouver) Service Battalion was created on 15 February 1965 and received royal assent in June 1977. Originally, the battalion was based at the North Jericho Complex and was named Vancouver Militia Service Battalion. In 1971, the battalion was reassigned to the South Jericho Complex. In 1974, changes to Militia service battalions of the Canadian Forces occurred and then led to the change in the battalion's name from Vancouver Militia Service Battalion to the current title, 12 (Vancouver) Service Battalion. On 10 April 1988, 12 (Vancouver) Service Battalion moved for the final time, from the South Jericho Complex to the current location where the battalion is headquartered, the Colonel Sherman Armoury in Richmond, British Columbia. On 8 March 1993, the City of Richmond awarded 12 (Vancouver) Service Battalion with freedom of the city and then on 17 April 1993, 12 (Vancouver) Service Battalion marched "through the city streets with drums beating, flags flying, and bayonets fixed."

In 2010, the two Service Battalions within 39 CBG, 11 (Victoria) Service Battalion and 12 (Vancouver) Service Battalion, were amalgamated and changed to companies. The two units now make up two companies of 39 Service Battalion. As a result, 11 (Victoria) Service Battalion was renamed: 11 (Victoria) Service Company, and 12 (Vancouver) Service Battalion was renamed: 12 (Vancouver) Service Company. The Armoury was used as a communications operations base for the 2010 Vancouver Winter Olympic Games.

=== 12 Military Police Platoon ===
12 Military Police Platoon (12 MP Pl) is not attached to 12 Svc Coy, but works within the same armoury. It is part of 15 Military Police Company (15 MP Coy), 1 Military Police Regiment (1 MP Regt). The platoon has two sections in Richmond, British Columbia and one section in Victoria, British Columbia. The role of the Primary Reserve Military Police is to augment the Regular Force. Their role is less comprehensive than that of Regular Force Military Police and includes the provision to the Department of National Defence of security and custodial services in both operational and non-operational theatres and on CF establishments; the protection of personnel, information and material against subversion, sabotage, espionage, terrorism and other forms of threat, the enforcement of discipline, the control and documentation of prisoners of war, NBC monitoring and traffic control in support of field operations.

== Colonel Sherman Armoury ==
The Colonel Sherman Armoury was built specifically for the needs of 12 Svc Coy and was the first armoury in Canada that was built for the needs of a Primary Reserve (Militia) service battalion. The armoury includes:

- Drill Hall
- Vehicle Maintenance Bay
- Vehicle Compound
- Forest Training Area
- Quartermaster
- Officers and NCO's Mess
- Several classrooms and a conference room
- Battalion Orderly Room (BOR)
- Kitchen
- 12 Military Police Platoon office
- Recruiting Office
- Driver's Room
- Museum

In addition to hosting 12 Svc Coy, the armoury also houses two Royal Canadian Army Cadets units, and one Royal Canadian Air Cadets unit:

- 655 (Richmond) Royal Canadian Air Cadet Squadron
- 2381 British Columbia Regiment (Irish Fusiliers) Royal Canadian Army Cadet Corps
- 2947 39 Service Battalion (RCEME) Royal Canadian Army Cadet Corps

2947 RCACC is affiliated to 12 (Vancouver) Service Coy and receives logistical and training support.

Cadets are not members of the Canadian Forces. Cadets is a youth program for 12- to 18-year-olds, the aim of which is to instill in youth the attributes of good citizenship and leadership, promote physical fitness and foster an interest in the sea, land, and air activities of the Canadian Forces.

== 12 Service Battalion Museum ==
12 Service Battalion Museum
- Location: The Sherman Armoury, 5500 No. 4 Road, Richmond, British Columbia, Canada
- Type: Service Battalion Museum

The museum collects, preserves, interprets and exhibits artifacts/archives related to 12 Service Battalion, its predecessor corps and other organizations connected to the military and social development of the unit. The museum is affiliated with: Canadian Museums Association, Canadian Heritage Information Network, Organization of Military Museums of Canada and Virtual Museum of Canada.

== See also ==
- 39 Service Battalion
- Canadian Forces Military Police
- Royal Canadian Logistics Service
- Organization of Military Museums of Canada
