= 5 Canadian Mechanized Brigade Group =

Brigade of the Canadian Army

- Active: 1968–present
- Country: Canada
- Allegiance: King Charles III
- Branch: Canadian Army
- Size: 1 regiment each of armour, artillery and combat engineers, 3 battalions of infantry
- Part of: 1st Canadian Division
- Garrison/HQ: CFB Valcartier
- Motto: French: Allons-y (Let's go)
- March: "Allons-y"
- Website: http://www.army-armee.forces.gc.ca/en/5-cmbg/index.page

Insignia
NATO Map Symbol
5
1

5 Canadian Mechanized Brigade Group (French: 5^{e} Groupe-brigade mécanisé du Canada) (5 CMBG) is a Canadian Forces brigade group that is part of 1st Canadian Division of the Canadian Army. It is based at CFB Valcartier, near Quebec City, Quebec. The brigade group is the formation responsible for the majority of francophone units of the regular army.

== History ==
5 Canadian Mechanized Brigade Group (5 CMBG) is similar in name to the 5th Brigade of the Canadian Expeditionary Force, for which Camp Valcartier was built. Founded in 1914, the 5th Brigade of the Canadian Expeditionary Force distinguished itself in many battles, particularly at Ypres, Vimy, The Somme, Passchendaele and the Hindenburg Line. The 5th Brigade of the Canadian Expeditionary Force was reconstituted in September 1939 as an active service formation. With the end of the war, the brigade was disbanded and its units resumed their role within the Canadian Reserves.

The establishment of 5 Combat Group was tied to the creation of the new units under its control and between 1977 and 1992, name changes became a relatively frequent occurrence for 5 Combat Group to reflect different operational roles. Thus, 5 Combat Group became 5 Canadian Brigade Group (1977), 5 Canadian Mechanized Brigade (1989) and, finally, 5 Canadian Mechanized Brigade Group (1992).

In January 2016, the 5 Canadian Mechanized Brigade Group was sent to eastern Europe as part of Operation Reassurance.

Today, 5 CMBG is made up of eight units: a light artillery regiment, an armoured regiment, a combat engineer regiment, a headquarters and signals squadron, three infantry battalions and a service battalion. Four other units provide support to 5 CMBG troops: 5 Field Ambulance, Dental Unit Detachment - Valcartier, 5 Military Police Platoon and 430 Tactical Helicopter Squadron.

== Units ==
Structure of the 5 GMBC

The brigade group's composition, as at 11 September 2026, is as follows:

5 Canadian Mechanized Brigade Group	Unit Types	CFB Valcartier
5 CMBG Headquarters & Signal Squadron	Headquarters and Communications	CFB Valcartier
12^{e} Régiment blindé du Canada	Armoured	CFB Valcartier
5 Combat Engineer Regiment	Combat engineers	CFB Valcartier
1st Battalion, Royal 22^{e} Régiment	Mechanized infantry	CFB Valcartier
2nd Battalion, Royal 22^{e} Régiment	Mechanized infantry	Quebec City
5 Service Battalion	Combat Service Support	CFB Valcartier

As part of the Canadian Army's major restructuring in September 2026, 5 CMBG gave up its artillery regiment - 5e Régiment d'artillerie légère du Canada - and its light infantry battalion - 3rd Battalion, Royal 22e Régiment- to the 1st Canadian Artillery Brigade and the 3rd Canadian Light Infantry Regiment respectively.

Two regular force units of other formations 430 Tactical Helicopter Squadron and 5 Field Ambulance of Canadian Forces Medical Group are collocated with 5 CMBG at CFB Valcartier and work closely with the brigade group but are not officially a part of it.

== See also ==
- Military history of Canada
- History of the Canadian Army
- Canadian Forces
- List of armouries in Canada
