= 2 Service Battalion =

The Canadian Army's 2 Service Battalion provides second-line Combat Service Support to 2 Canadian Mechanized Brigade Group (CMBG), including transportation, supply, and maintenance to assigned formations for domestic and deployed operations. The service battalion also provides essential institutional support to CFB Petawawa lodger units.

== Bibliography ==
- "2 Service Battalion | Regular Force Unit | Canadian Army". army-armee.forces.gc.ca.
- nurun.com. "A new CO for 2 Service Battalion | Pembroke Daily Observer". thedailyobserver.ca.
- "2 Service Battalion | Facebook". facebook.com.
