= National Support Element =

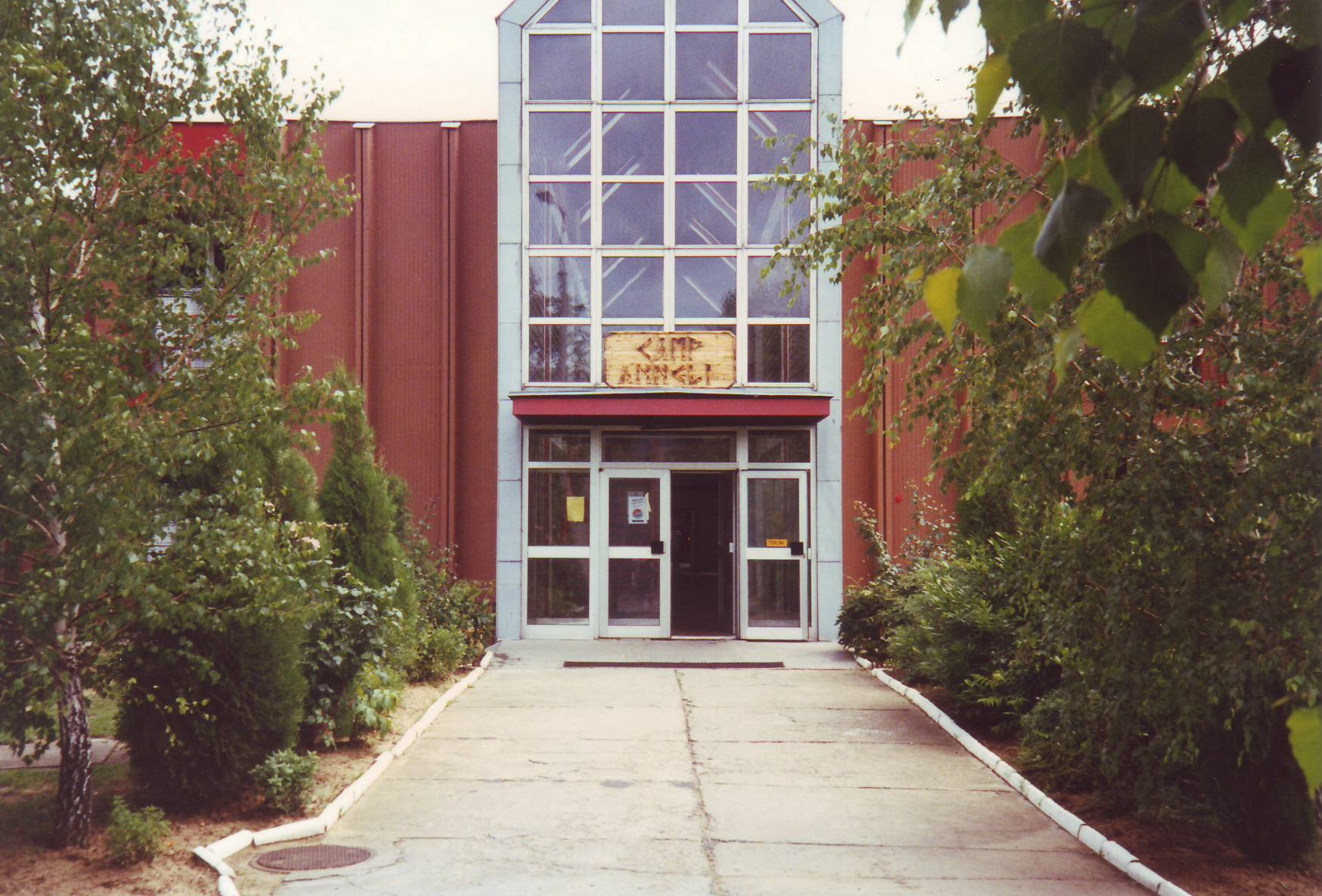
Main entrance to the Nordic Support Group HQ in Camp Anneli, Pécs, Hungary

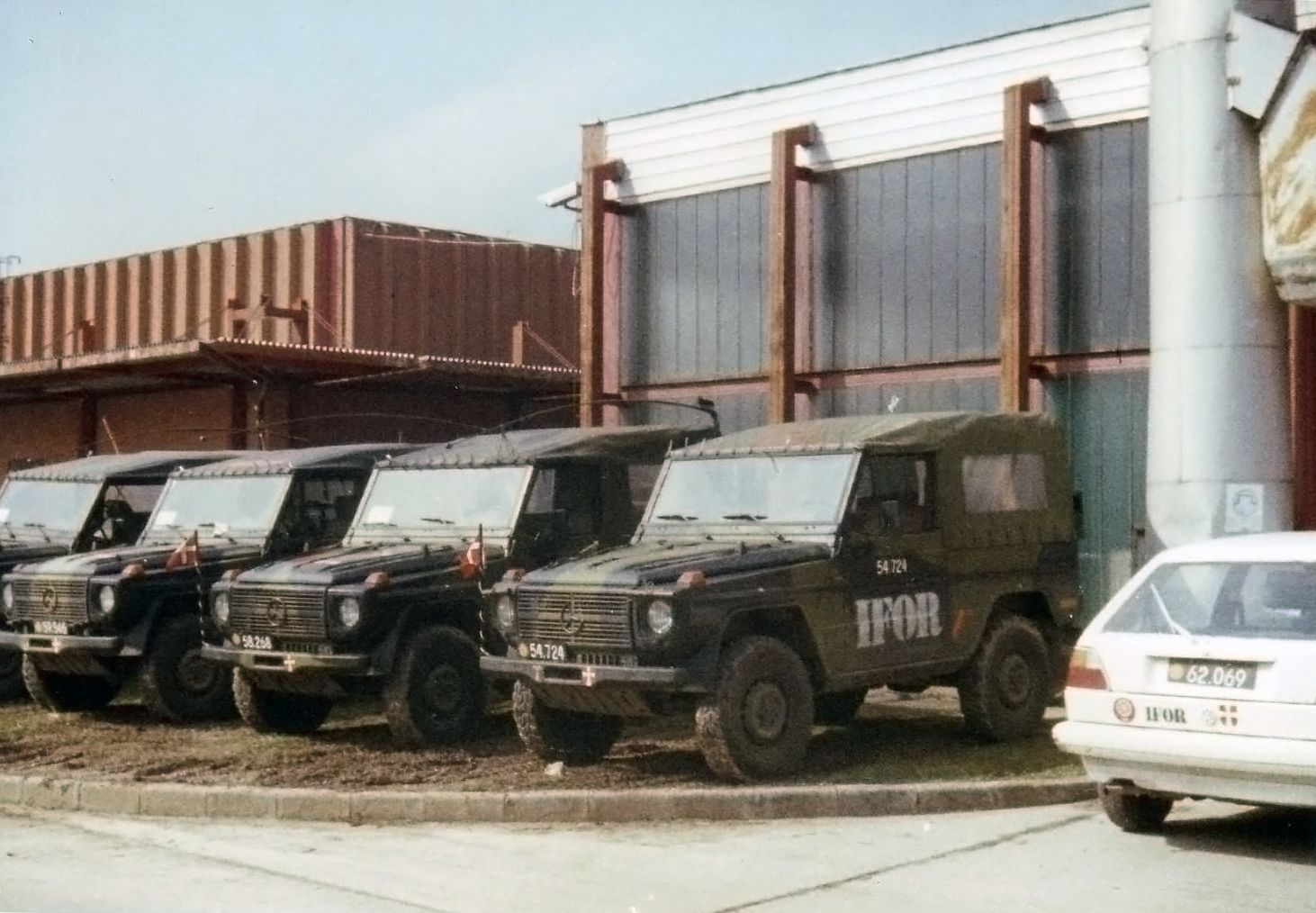
Danish NSE vehicles parked at Camp Anneli

National Support Elements (NSE) were part of the IFOR, and later the SFOR, NATO led forces, which were deployed primarily in former Yugoslavia from 1996 to 2004 (when replaced by EUFOR). Many of the NSE's were deployed in Hungary - even though this country was neither part of the conflict, nor a NATO member at the time - because of the local stability, good infrastructure, access to local supply ordering and relatively short distance to the battalions in Bosnia.

Each of the contributing countries deployed their own logistic support units. The Nordic countries and Poland deployed their NSE's under the common name of Nordic Support Group (NSG), which were situated at the same location in Pécs, Hungary for the participating countries. A similar U.S. unit was situated in Kaposvár some 40 km from Pécs, as well as a German in Split in southern Croatia, at the coast.

Each NSE had the responsibility of relaying supplies, spare parts, money, ammunition, mail, and food to the respective national IFOR units deployed in Croatia and Bosnia, as well as personnel and visitor transportation between Budapest and Croatia/Bosnia-Herzegovina. Occasionally, small units were sent to both Croatia and Bosnia to perform different support tasks from there, primarily logistics operations from Slavonski Brod at the Sava river between Croatia and Bosnia-Herzegovina.

The Nordic Support Group consisted of units from Denmark, Norway, Sweden, Finland, and Poland.

The NSE has become a commonly used unit name, thus a similar unit has also been deployed in North Macedonia (Skopje)as part of the Kosovo Force (KFOR) mission and in Afghanistan as part of ISAF.
