= 39 Canadian Brigade Group =

Brigade of the Canadian Army

- 39^{e} Groupe-brigade du Canada
- Brigade group badge
- Active: 1997–present
- Country: Canada
- Branch: Canadian Army
- Type: Headquarters
- Part of: 2nd Canadian Division
- Garrison/HQ: Major-General B.M. Hoffmeister Building, Vancouver, British Columbia
- Motto: Splendor sine occasu (Latin for 'Splendour without diminishment')
- March: "39 Canadian Brigade Group March"
- Website: canada.ca/en/army/corporate/3-canadian-division/39-canadian-brigade-group.html

Commanders
- Brigade Commander: Colonel P.A. Lindsay
- Brigade Sergeant Major: CWO A. Harris

Insignia
NATO Map Symbol
39 CBG
2 Cdn Div
- Unit abbreviation: 39 CBG

39 Canadian Brigade Group (39 CBG. French: 39^{e} Groupe-brigade du Canada) is a Canadian Forces formation of the Canadian Army under the 2nd Canadian Division. The brigade group is composed of Canadian Forces (CF) Primary Reserve units, all of which are based within the province of British Columbia. 39 CBG Headquarters is at the Major-General B.M. Hoffmeister OC, CB, CBE, DSO Building, 1755 West 1st Avenue, Vancouver.

The brigade group is made of approximately 1,500 soldiers in reserve units in communities across British Columbia. Most of the soldiers in 39 CBG are reservists, serving part-time within their communities.

The brigade maintains armoured, artillery, infantry, engineer and service support units to assist Joint Task Force Pacific (JTFP) and Canadian Joint Operations Command with domestic operations support (natural disasters, etc.), as well as supporting the Regular Force units of the 2nd Canadian Division by supporting and augmenting its battle groups. Soldiers of 39 CBG are trained in supporting domestic and also expeditionary operations. Every year many members of 39 CBG volunteer to serve all over the world in UN and NATO deployments. Hundreds of soldiers within the brigade have experience in deploying to the mission in Afghanistan as well as deploying to support the security operations for the Vancouver 2010 Olympic and Paralympic Winter Games.

== Brigade units ==
Unit	Type	Location
39 Canadian Brigade Group Headquarters	Headquarters	Vancouver
5th (British Columbia) Field Artillery Regiment, RCA	Artillery	Headquarters, 155 Battery & Band (Victoria); 56 Battery (Nanaimo)
15th Field Artillery Regiment, RCA	Artillery	Vancouver
39 Combat Engineer Regiment	Combat Engineer	Headquarters & 54 Engineer Squadron (Chilliwack); 6 Engineer Squadron (North Vancouver); 44 Engineer Squadron (Trail); Det Cranbrook (Cranbrook)
39 Service Battalion	Service and support	Headquarters & 12 Company (Richmond); 11 Company (Victoria)
39 Signal Regiment	Communications	Headquarters & A Squadron (Vancouver); B Squadron (Victoria); 1 Troop (Nanaimo); 2 Troop (Victoria); C Squadron (Kelowna)
The Rocky Mountain Rangers	Infantry	Headquarters & A Company (Kamloops); B Company (Prince George)
The British Columbia Dragoons	Armoured	Kelowna
The British Columbia Regiment (Duke of Connaught's Own)	Armoured	Vancouver
The Canadian Scottish Regiment (Princess Mary's)	Infantry	Headquarters & A Company (Victoria); B Company (Nanaimo); 4 & 5 Platoon (Nanaimo); 6 Platoon (Comox)
The Royal Westminster Regiment	Infantry	Headquarters & A Company (New Westminster); D Company (Chilliwack)
The Seaforth Highlanders of Canada	Infantry	Vancouver

Cities with 39 CBG units

== Other units ==
39 CBG is supported by several other units that provide specialist duties, such as medical services, military police and intelligence. These units do not fall under the 39 CBG command structure; however, they do work closely with it in order to provide these services to the soldiers of the brigade group.

=== Medical ===
The medical needs of 39 CBG, such as tending to wounded troops in the field, are provided by two field ambulance units. These two units are part of the Royal Canadian Medical Service and 1 Health Services Group.

- 11 (Victoria) Field Ambulance in Victoria
- 12 (Vancouver) Field Ambulance in Vancouver

=== Military police ===
The military police support for 39 CBG is provided by the Canadian Forces Military Police. The military police unit assigned to the brigade is 12 Military Police Platoon (12 MP Pl) and is based out of the Colonel Sherman Armoury in Richmond. 12 Military Police Platoon reports to its parent unit, 15 Military Police Company, and 1 Military Police Regiment, both based out of Canadian Forces Base Edmonton (CFB Edmonton).

=== Intelligence ===
Military intelligence services for 39 CBG are provided by 4 Platoon of 6 Intelligence Company based out the Major-General Bert Hoffmeister Building in Vancouver. The unit headquarters is at Brigadier James Curry Jefferson Armoury and operates several platoons in several brigade groups. 6 Int Coy operates platoons in:

- Edmonton
- Vancouver
- Winnipeg

== Armories ==
Armoury	Location	Units
Gen A.W. Currie Armoury	Victoria, BC	5th (British Columbia) Field Artillery Regiment, RCA, Canadian Scottish Regiment (Princess Mary's)
LGen E.C. Ashton Armoury	Victoria, BC	39 Service Battalion, 39 Signal Regiment
Brig D.R. Sargent Armoury	Nanaimo, BC	5th (British Columbia) Field Artillery Regiment, RCA, 39 Signal Regiment, Canadian Scottish Regiment (Princess Mary's)
Seal Bay Armoury	Comox, BC	Canadian Scottish Regiment (Princess Mary's)
LCol J.P. Fell Armoury	North Vancouver, BC	39 Combat Engineer Regiment
Beatty Street Drill Hall	Vancouver, BC	British Columbia Regiment (Duke of Connaught's Own)
Seaforth Armoury	Vancouver, BC	Seaforth Highlanders of Canada
MGen B.M. Hoffmeister Building	Vancouver, BC	Headquarters, 39 Signal Regiment
Bessborough Armoury	Vancouver, BC	15th Field Artillery Regiment, RCA
The Armoury (New Westminster)	New Westminster, BC	Royal Westminster Regiment
Colonel Sherman Armoury	Richmond, BC	39 Service Battalion
Col R.K. St. John Armoury	Chilliwack, BC	39 Combat Engineer Regiment, Royal Westminster Regiment
Brig H.H. Angle Armoury	Kelowna, BC	39 Signal Regiment, The British Columbia Dragoons
Brigadier W.C. Murphy Armoury	Vernon, BC	
Col J.R. Vicars Armoury	Kamloops, BC	Rocky Mountain Rangers
Meadows Armoury	Prince George, BC	Rocky Mountain Rangers

== Exercise Cougar Salvo ==
Exercise Cougar Salvo is 39 CBG's annual field training exercise which combines the brigade as a whole. Every year, the exercise is held in a different location, usually in British Columbia. In 2006, it was held in the streets of Kamloops, in 2007, at HMCS Quadra Sea Cadet Summer Training Centre near Comox. However, it has been held in other locations, such as in the United States. In 2012, Exercise Cougar Salvo was held in Boise, Idaho.
