= Structure of the Canadian Army =

This is the structure of the Canadian Army, as of the restructure conducted in September 2026.

== 1st Canadian Division – Manoeuvre Division ==
As the Canadian Army's primary combat force, the Manoeuvre Division is structured for rapid deployment and high-readiness operations. Under one tactical command, it integrates all key operating functions – command, sense, act, shield and sustain – enabling decisive action in both major combat and crisis scenarios. This division also enables expeditionary mobilization.

- Headquarters, 1st Canadian Division, at CFB Edmonton

1st Canadian Mechanized Brigade Group

1 Signal Regiment, at CFB Edmonton

Lord Strathcona's Horse (Royal Canadians), at CFB Edmonton

1st Battalion, Princess Patricia's Canadian Light Infantry, at CFB Edmonton

2nd Battalion, Princess Patricia's Canadian Light Infantry, at CFB Shilo

1 Combat Engineer Regiment, at CFB Edmonton

1 Service Battalion, at CFB Edmonton

2nd Canadian Mechanized Brigade Group

2 Signal Regiment, at CFB Petawawa

The Royal Canadian Dragoons, at CFB Petawawa

1st Battalion, The Royal Canadian Regiment, at CFB Petawawa

2nd Battalion, The Royal Canadian Regiment, at CFB Gagetown

2 Combat Engineer Regiment, at CFB Petawawa

2 Service Battalion, at CFB Petawawa

5th Canadian Mechanized Brigade Group

5 Signal Regiment, at CFB Valcartier

12^{e} Régiment blindé du Canada, at CFB Valcartier

1st Battalion, Royal 22^{e} Régiment, at CFB Valcartier

2nd Battalion, Royal 22^{e} Régiment, at Citadelle of Quebec

5 Combat Engineer Regiment, at CFB Valcartier

5 Service Battalion, at CFB Valcartier

3rd Canadian Light Infantry Regiment

A new high-readiness formation responsible for rapid global response and operations in complex terrain, including the Arctic. It is composed of the Army's three Regular Force light infantry battalions.

3rd Battalion, The Royal Canadian Regiment, at CFB Petawawa

3rd Battalion, Princess Patricia's Canadian Light Infantry, at CFB Edmonton

3rd Battalion, Royal 22^{e} Régiment, at CFB Valcartier

6 Canadian Combat Support Brigade (6 CCSB)

6 Signal Regiment, at CFB Kingston

4th Artillery Regiment (General Support), Royal Canadian Artillery, at CFB Gagetown

4 Engineer Support Regiment, at CFB Gagetown

Canadian Army Intelligence Regiment, at Kingston

21 Electronic Warfare Regiment, at CFB Kingston

Influence Activities Task Force, at Halifax

1st Canadian Artillery Brigade

A new formation designed to centralize and coordinate the division's deep and close fire support.

1st Regiment, Royal Canadian Horse Artillery, at CFB Shilo

2nd Regiment, Royal Canadian Horse Artillery, at CFB Petawawa

5^{e} Régiment d'artillerie légère du Canada, at CFB Valcartier

1st Canadian Sustainment Brigade

A new formation providing logistics, maintenance, and supply for prolonged high-intensity operations.

Logistics Battalion
Maintenance Battalion

== 2nd Canadian Division – Defence of Canada Division ==
The Defence of Canada Division is the primary force for domestic operations, mobilization, and provides the framework for the Army Reserve. The division commands all ten of the Canadian Army's reserve brigades.

- Headquarters, 2nd Canadian Division, at CFB Montreal

=== 1st Canadian Ranger Group ===
1st Canadian Ranger Group

1st Canadian Ranger Patrol Group, at CFNA HQ Yellowknife

2nd Canadian Ranger Patrol Group, at Saint-Jean Garrison

3rd Canadian Ranger Patrol Group, at CFB Borden

4th Canadian Ranger Patrol Group, at CFB Albert Head

5th Canadian Ranger Patrol Group, at CFB Gander

=== 31 Canadian Brigade Group ===
31 Canadian Brigade Group

Headquarters, 31 Canadian Brigade Group, at Wolseley Barracks, London

1st Hussars, at Wolseley Barracks, London

Windsor Regiment, at Maj. F.A. Tilston VC Armoury, Windsor

Royal Hamilton Light Infantry (Wentworth Regiment), at John Weir Foote VC Armoury, Hamilton

4th Battalion, The Royal Canadian Regiment, at Wolseley Barracks, London

Royal Highland Fusiliers of Canada, at Colonel J.A. McIntosh DSO, ED, Armoury, Cambridge

Essex and Kent Scottish, at Maj. F.A. Tilston VC Armoury, Windsor

Argyll and Sutherland Highlanders of Canada (Princess Louise's), at John Weir Foote VC Armoury, Hamilton

Lincoln and Welland Regiment, at Lake Street Armoury, St. Catharines

11th Field Artillery Regiment, RCA, at Guelph Armoury, Guelph

31 Combat Engineer Regiment (The Elgin's), at St. Thomas Armoury, St. Thomas

31 Signal Regiment, at John Weir Foote VC Armoury, Hamilton

31 Service Battalion, at Wolseley Barracks, London

=== 32 Canadian Brigade Group ===
32 Canadian Brigade Group

Headquarters, 32 Canadian Brigade Group, at Denison Armoury, Toronto

Governor General's Horse Guards, at Denison Armoury, Toronto

Queen's York Rangers (1st American Regiment), at Fort York Armoury, Toronto

Ontario Regiment, at Colonel R.S. McLaughlin Armoury, Oshawa

Queen's Own Rifles of Canada, at Moss Park Armoury, Toronto

Royal Regiment of Canada, at Fort York Armoury, Toronto

Lorne Scots (Peel, Dufferin and Halton Regiment), at Brampton Armoury, Brampton

48th Highlanders of Canada, at Moss Park Armoury, Toronto

Toronto Scottish Regiment (Queen Elizabeth The Queen Mother's Own), at Captain Bellenden Hutcheson VC Armoury, Toronto

Grey and Simcoe Foresters, at Barrie Armoury, Barrie

7th Toronto Regiment, RCA, at Moss Park Armoury, Toronto

56th Field Artillery Regiment, RCA, at Sergeant William Merrifield VC Armoury, Brantford

32 Combat Engineer Regiment, at Denison Armoury, Toronto

32 Signal Regiment, at Fort York Armoury, Toronto

32 Service Battalion, at Denison Armoury, Toronto

=== 33 Canadian Brigade Group ===
33 Canadian Brigade Group

Headquarters, 33 Canadian Brigade Group, at 1745 Alta Vista Drive, Ottawa

Governor General's Foot Guards, at Cartier Square Drill Hall, Ottawa

Princess of Wales' Own Regiment, at Kingston Armoury, Kingston

Hastings and Prince Edward Regiment, at Belleville Armoury, Belleville

Brockville Rifles, at Brockville Armoury, Brockville

Stormont, Dundas and Glengarry Highlanders, at Cornwall Armoury, Cornwall

Cameron Highlanders of Ottawa (Duke of Edinburgh's Own), at Cartier Square Drill Hall, Ottawa

Algonquin Regiment (Northern Pioneers), at Martin Leo Troy Armoury, North Bay

2nd Battalion, Irish Regiment of Canada, at Sudbury Armoury, Sudbury

30th Field Artillery Regiment, RCA, at Canadian Forces Support Unit (Ottawa) – Uplands Site, Ottawa

42nd Field Artillery Regiment (Lanark and Renfrew Scottish), RCA, at Pembroke Armoury, Pembroke

49th Field Artillery Regiment, RCA, at Sault Ste. Marie Armoury, Sault Ste. Marie

33 Combat Engineer Regiment, at Major E.J.G. Holland VC Armoury, Ottawa

33 Signal Regiment, at Major E.J.G. Holland VC Armoury, Ottawa

33 Service Battalion, at Major E.J.G. Holland VC Armoury, Ottawa

=== 34 Canadian Brigade Group ===
34 Canadian Brigade Group

Headquarters, 34 Canadian Brigade Group, at CFB Montreal

Royal Canadian Hussars, at Côte-des-Neiges Armoury, Montreal

Régiment de Hull, at Salaberry Armoury, Gatineau

Canadian Grenadier Guards, at Canadian Grenadier Guards’ Armoury, Montreal

Black Watch (Royal Highland Regiment) of Canada, at Black Watch Armoury, Montreal

4th Battalion, Royal 22^{e} Régiment, at Charles Michel de Salaberry Armoury, Laval

6th Battalion, Royal 22^{e} Régiment, at Saint-Hyacinthe Armoury, Saint-Hyacinthe

Fusiliers Mont-Royal, at Manège Henri-Julien, Montreal

Régiment de Maisonneuve, at Cathcart Armoury, Montreal

Royal Montreal Regiment, at Westmount Armoury, Westmount

2nd Field Artillery Regiment, RCA, at Côte des Neiges Armoury, Montreal

34 Combat Engineer Regiment, at CFB Montreal

34 Service Battalion, at Saint-Hubert Garrison

34 Signal Regiment, at Westmount Armoury, Westmount

=== 35 Canadian Brigade Group ===
35 Canadian Brigade Group

Headquarters, 35 Canadian Brigade Group, at Citadelle of Quebec

Sherbrooke Hussars, at William Street Armoury, Sherbrooke

12^{e} Régiment blindé du Canada (Militia)', at Général-Jean-Victor-Allard Armoury, Trois-Rivières

Voltigeurs de Québec, at Voltigeurs de Québec Armoury, Quebec City

Les Fusiliers du S^{t}-Laurent, at Rimouski Armoury, Rimouski

Régiment de la Chaudière, at Lévis Armoury, Lévis

Régiment du Saguenay, at Saguenay Armoury, Saguenay

Fusiliers de Sherbrooke, at Colonel Gaétan Côté Armoury, Sherbrooke

6th Field Artillery Regiment, RCA, at Lévis Armoury, Lévis

62nd Field Artillery Regiment, RCA, at Gérard F. Dufresne Armoury, Shawinigan

35 Combat Engineer Regiment, at Sainte-Foy Armoury, Quebec

35 Signal Regiment, at Beauport Armoury, Quebec City

35 Service Battalion, at S^{t}-Malo Military Complex, Quebec City

=== 36 Canadian Brigade Group ===
36 Canadian Brigade Group

Headquarters, 36 Canadian Brigade Group, at Royal Artillery Park, Halifax

Halifax Rifles (RCAC), at Halifax Armoury, Halifax

Prince Edward Island Regiment, at Queen Charlotte Armory, Charlottetown

Princess Louise Fusiliers, at Halifax Armoury, Halifax

West Nova Scotia Regiment, at 5 CDSB Detachment Aldershot, Kentville

Nova Scotia Highlanders, at Truro Armoury, Truro

Cape Breton Highlanders, at Victoria Park Armoury, Sydney

1st (Halifax-Dartmouth) Field Artillery Regiment, RCA, at Bayers Lake Armoury, Halifax

84th Independent Field Battery, RCA, at Yarmouth Armoury, Yarmouth

36 Combat Engineer Regiment, at CFB Shearwater

36 Signal Regiment, at Willow Park armoury, Halifax

36 Service Battalion, at Willow Park armoury, Halifax

=== 37 Canadian Brigade Group ===
37 Canadian Brigade Group

Headquarters, 37 Canadian Brigade Group, at 5 CDSB Detachment Moncton

8th Canadian Hussars (Princess Louise's), at 5 CDSB Detachment Moncton

The Royal New Brunswick Regiment (Carleton & York), at Carlton Street Armoury, Fredericton

North Shore (New Brunswick) Regiment, at Colonel CCL Gammon Armoury, Bathurst

1st Battalion, Royal Newfoundland Regiment, at CFS St. John's

2nd Battalion, Royal Newfoundland Regiment, at Gallipoli Armoury, Corner Brook

3rd Field Artillery Regiment, RCA, at The Barrack Green Armoury, Saint John

37 Combat Engineer Regiment, at CFS St. John's

37 Signal Regiment, at CFS St. John's

37 Service Battalion, at CFS St. John's

=== 38 Canadian Brigade Group ===
38 Canadian Brigade Group

Headquarters, 38 Canadian Brigade Group, at Winnipeg

Saskatchewan Dragoons, at Lieutenant Colonel DV Currie VC Armoury, Moose Jaw

Fort Garry Horse, at Lieutenant-Colonel Harcus Strachan, VC, MC Armoury, Winnipeg

Royal Winnipeg Rifles, at Minto Armoury, Winnipeg

Lake Superior Scottish Regiment, at O'Kelly VC Armoury, Thunder Bay

North Saskatchewan Regiment, at Sergeant Hugh Cairns VC Armoury, Saskatoon

Royal Regina Rifles, at Regina Armoury, Regina

Queen's Own Cameron Highlanders of Canada, at Minto Armoury, Winnipeg

10th Field Artillery Regiment, RCA, at Regina Armoury, Regina

26th Field Artillery Regiment, RCA, at Brandon Armoury, Brandon

116th Independent Field Battery, RCA, at Kenora Armoury, Kenora

38 Combat Engineer Regiment, at Sergeant Hugh Cairns VC Armoury, Saskatoon

38 Signal Regiment, at Minto Armoury, Winnipeg

38 Service Battalion, at Sergeant Hugh Cairns VC Armoury, Saskatoon

=== 39 Canadian Brigade Group ===
39 Canadian Brigade Group

Headquarters, 39 Canadian Brigade Group, at Major-General B.M. Hoffmeister OC, CB, CBE, DSO Building, Vancouver

British Columbia Regiment (Duke of Connaught's Own), at Beatty Street Drill Hall, Vancouver

British Columbia Dragoons, at Brigadier Angle Armoury, Kelowna

Rocky Mountain Rangers, at JR Vicars Armoury, Kamloops

Royal Westminster Regiment, at The Armoury, New Westminster

Seaforth Highlanders of Canada, at Seaforth Armoury, Vancouver

Canadian Scottish Regiment (Princess Mary's), at Bay Street Armoury, Victoria

5th (British Columbia) Field Artillery Regiment, RCA, at Bay Street Armoury, Victoria

15th Field Artillery Regiment, RCA, at Bessborough Armoury, Vancouver

39 Combat Engineer Regiment, at Colonel Roger Kenwood St. John, OMM, CD Armoury, Chilliwack

39 Signal Regiment, at Major-General B.M. Hoffmeister OC, CB, CBE, DSO Building, Vancouver

39 Service Battalion, at Colonel Sherman Armoury, Richmond

=== 41 Canadian Brigade Group ===
41 Canadian Brigade Group

Headquarters, 41 Canadian Brigade Group, at Currie Armoury, Calgary

South Alberta Light Horse, at Patterson Armoury, Medicine Hat

King's Own Calgary Regiment, at Mewata Armoury, Calgary

Loyal Edmonton Regiment, at Brigadier James Curry Jefferson Armoury, Edmonton

Calgary Highlanders, at Mewata Armoury, Calgary

20th Field Artillery Regiment, RCA, at Lieutenant-Colonel Philip Debney Armoury, Edmonton

20th Independent Field Battery, RCA, at Vimy Ridge Armoury, Lethbridge

41 Combat Engineer Regiment, at Lieutenant-Colonel Philip Debney Armoury, Edmonton

41 Signal Regiment, at Lieutenant-Colonel Philip Debney Armoury, Edmonton

41 Service Battalion, at Currie Armoury, Calgary

== Canadian Army Support Division ==
Structure of the Canadian Army Support Division, Sept. 2026

The Canadian Army Support Division provides the foundational infrastructure, services, and technical expertise in support of Army operations. It maintains links with Canada’s supply chains and has support groups across four regions, ensuring consistent readiness, effective mobilization, and support to domestic and expeditionary missions.

- Headquarters, Canadian Army Support Division, at Denison Armoury in Toronto
- Canadian Support Group Atlantic
  - CSGA HQ
  - CFB Gagetown
  - Camp Aldershot
  - Garrison Sydney
  - Garrison St. John’s
  - Detachment Charlottetown
  - Atlantic Signals Squadron
- Canadian Support Group East
  - CSGE HQ
  - CFB Valcartier
  - CFB Montreal
  - Garrison St-Jean
- Canadian Support Group Central
  - CSGC HQ
  - CFB Petawawa
  - CFB Meaford
  - Garrison Toronto
  - Central Signals Squadron
- Canadian Support Group West
  - CSGW HQ
  - CFB Edmonton
  - CFB Shilo
  - CFB Suffield
  - CFB Wainwright
- CFB Kingston

== Canadian Army Doctrine and Training Centre ==
Canadian Army Doctrine and Training Centre as organized in 2020 (Click image to enlarge)

- Headquarters, Canadian Army Doctrine and Training Centre, at CFB Kingston
  - Canadian Army Command and Staff College, at Fort Frontenac
  - Canadian Manoeuvre Training Centre, at CFB Wainwright
  - Army Doctrine Centre, at CFB Kingston
  - Canadian Army Simulation Centre, at CFB Kingston
  - Canadian Army Lessons Learned Centre, at CFB Kingston
  - Peace Support Training Centre, at CFB Kingston
  - Canadian Armed Forces Arctic Training Centre, at Resolute Bay

Army Training Centre

The Army Training Centre consolidated the four training centres that previously answered to the geographic divisions during the 2026 restructure of the Canadian Army.

- Headquarters, Army Training Centre, at CFB Gagetown
  - Army Training Centre-West, at CFB Edmonton
  - Army Training Centre-Central, at CFB Meaford
  - Army Training Centre-East, at CFB Valcartier
  - Army Training Centre-Atlantic, at CFB Gagetown
  - 31 CBG Battle School
  - 32 CBG Battle School
  - 33 CBG Battle School
  - 34 CBG Battle School
  - 35 CBG Battle School
  - 36/37 CBG Battle School
  - 38 CBG Battle School
  - 39 CBG Battle School
  - 41 CBG Battle School

Combat Training Centre

- Headquarters, Combat Training Centre, at CFB Gagetown
  - Royal Canadian Armoured Corps School, at CFB Gagetown
  - Royal Regiment of Canadian Artillery School, at CFB Gagetown
  - Royal Canadian School of Infantry, at CFB Gagetown
  - Canadian Forces School of Military Engineering, at CFB Gagetown
  - Canadian Forces School of Communications and Electronics, at CFB Kingston
  - Royal Canadian Electrical and Mechanical Engineers School, at CFB Borden
  - Canadian Army Tactics School, at CFB Gagetown
  - Canadian Army Advanced Warfare Centre, at CFB Trenton
  - Canadian Army Trials and Evaluations Unit, at CFB Gagetown
  - Canadian Army Learning Support Centre, at CFB Gagetown
