= CFB Montreal =

Military base in Montreal, Canada

2nd Canadian Division Support Base Valcartier, Detachment Montreal
- BFC Montréal
- Longue-Pointe

Site information
- Type: Military base
- Controlled by: Canadian Armed Forces
- Condition: Operational
- Website: http://forces.gc.ca/en/about-economic-impact/asu-montreal.page

Location
- Location within Montreal Location within Quebec Location within Canada
- Coordinates: 45°34′34″N 073°31′23″W

2nd Canadian Division Support Base Valcartier, Detachment Montreal, formerly known as and commonly referred to as Canadian Forces Base Montreal (also CFB Montreal or Longue-Pointe) is a Canadian Forces Base network located in Montreal, Quebec. The address of CFB Montreal is 6769 Notre-Dame Street.

== History ==
In 1994, the Canadian Forces Bases (CFBs) in Montreal and Saint-Jean were merged to create a new entity, an expanded CFB Montreal that included the Longue-Pointe, Saint-Hubert (Saint-Hubert), CFB Saint-Jean, Farnham and Saint-Bruno-de-Montarville sites. In 1998, the mergers culminated in the amalgamation of CFB Montreal and CFB Valcartier into a new organization, 5 Area Support Group (now 2nd Canadian Division Support Group).

== Physical description ==
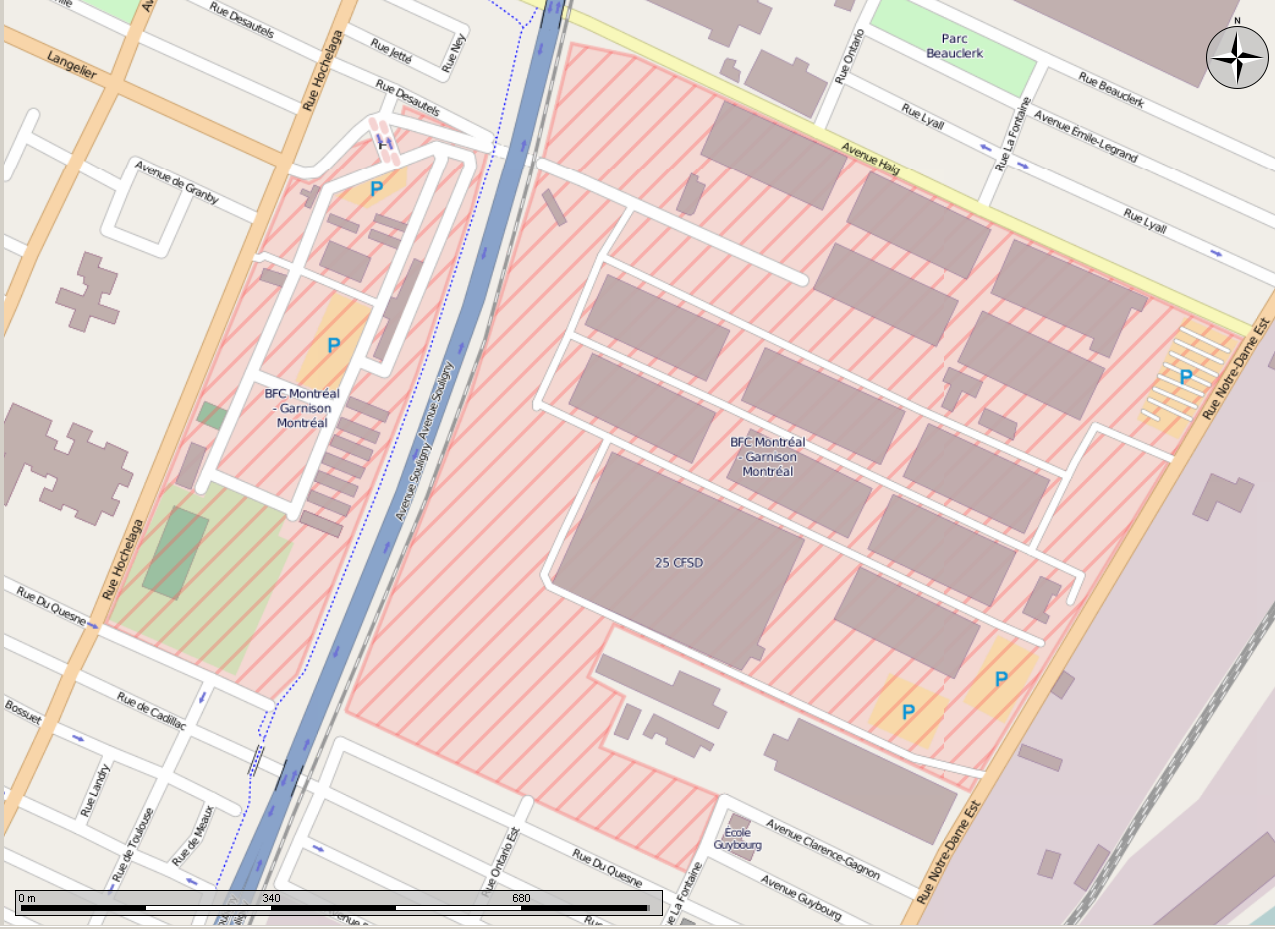
A map of CFB Montreal

CFB Montreal is delimited by sectors north and south accessible from streets Notre-Dame Street and Hochelaga. The north and south sectors of CFB Montreal occupy an area of 2.8 km (1.7 mi) square.

Montreal CFB covers several sites: for example many armories welcome Primary Reserves to the site of Saint-Bruno-de-Montarville or marine equipment trials in the LaSalle borough.

On the Saint-Hubert site, 190 housing are available to military staff.

The garrison is an important military base located in the heart of Montreal, with estimated local spending impacts (direct and indirect) of $223,210,000.

== Units, formation and reserves forces ==
The base itself is home to a number of units, formations of both the Regular and Reserve forces, including:

- 202 Workshop Depot (Corps of Royal Canadian Electrical and Mechanical Engineers)
- 25 CFSD (Canadian Forces Supply Depot)
- Army Equipment Fielding Centre
- 2nd Canadian Division
  - Headquarters
  - 4 Intelligence Company
- 34 Canadian Brigade Group (Reserve) Headquarters, responsible for local units including:
  - The Royal Canadian Hussars (Montreal) (Reserve) (armoured)
  - 2nd Field Artillery Regiment (Canada) (Artillery)
  - The Canadian Grenadier Guards (Reserve) (light infantry)
  - The Black Watch (Royal Highland Regiment) of Canada (Reserve) (light infantry)
  - The Royal Montreal Regiment (Reserve) (light infantry)
  - Le Régiment de Maisonneuve (Reserve) (light infantry)
  - Les Fusiliers Mont-Royal (Reserve) (light infantry)
  - 34 Combat Engineer Regiment (Reserve) (Engineers)
- 5 MP Regiment detachment
- Joint Task Force East

== The CFB Montreal newspaper ==
The Journal Servir is the official newspaper of CFB Montreal. It covers the military community west of Quebec (CFB Montreal and CFB Saint-Jean). Every second Wednesday, some 3,300 copies are distributed free of charge to CFB Montreal, Saint-Jean and elsewhere in the region covered.

== Building 42 ==
Building 42, also called the Administration Building, is on the Canadian Register of Historic Places. The one-storey building faces Notre-Dame Street and was constructed in 1941.

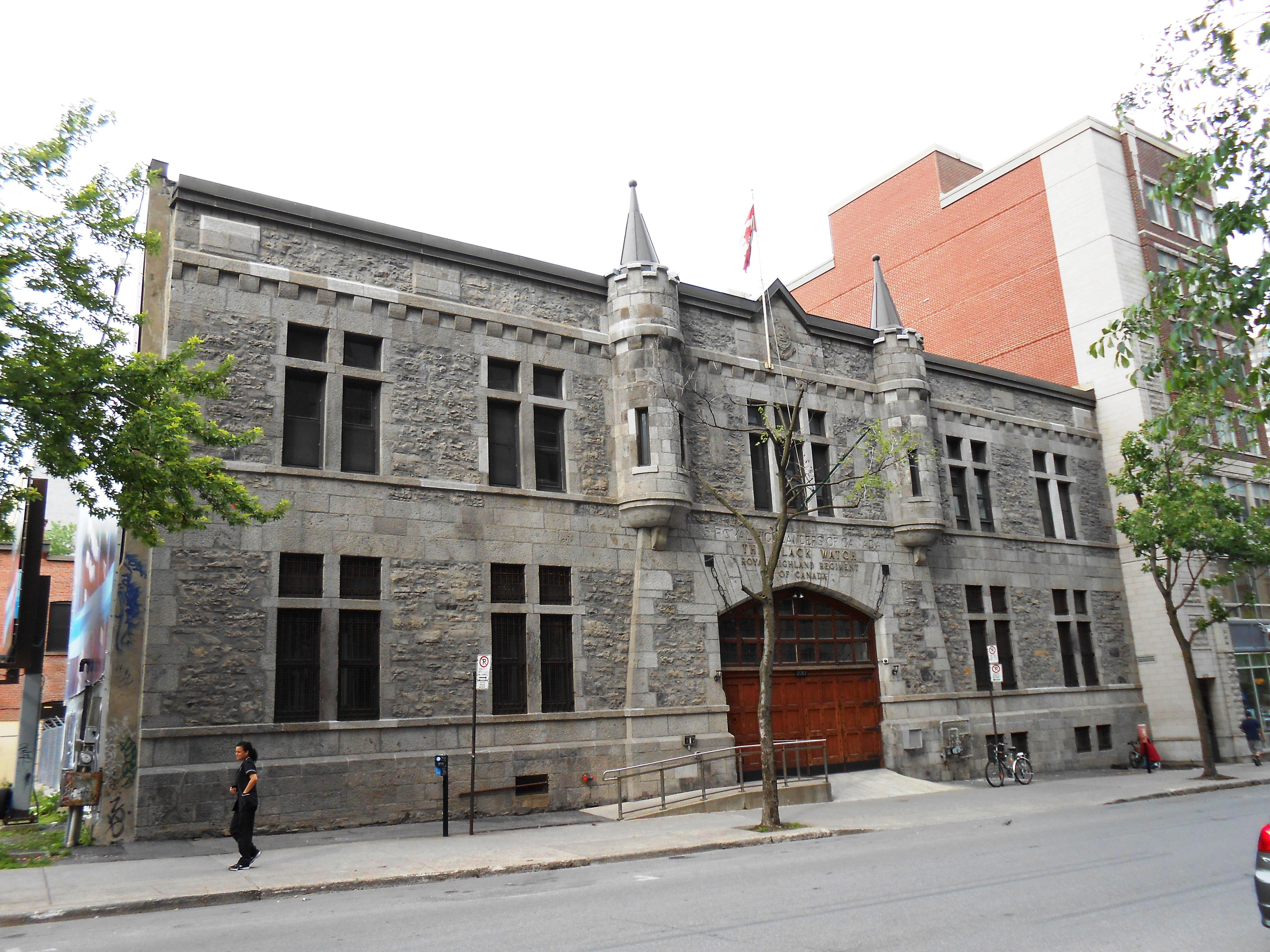
The Black Watch Armoury.

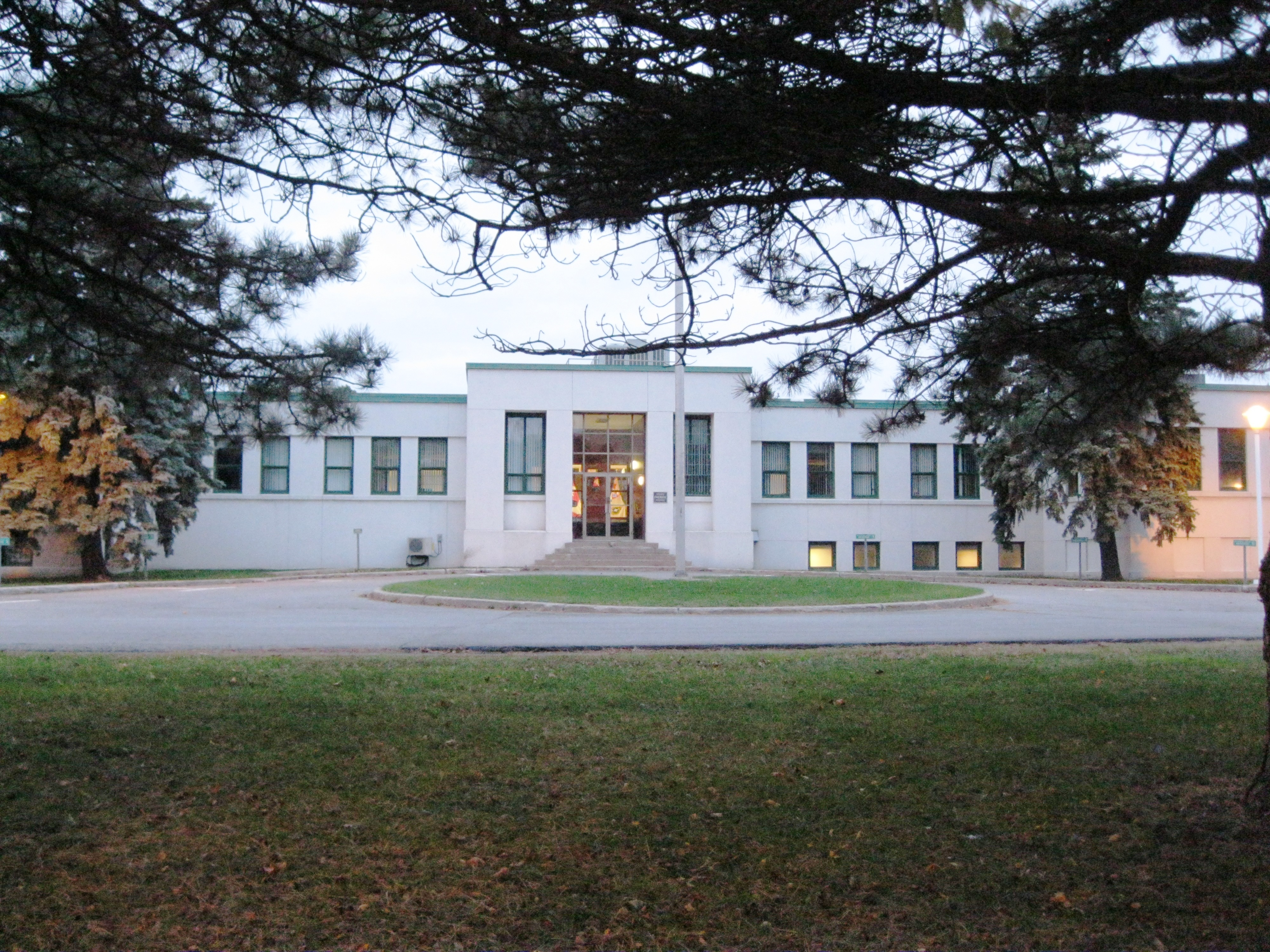
Building 42.
