= Longue-Pointe =

Coordinates: 45°35′0″N 73°31′0″W

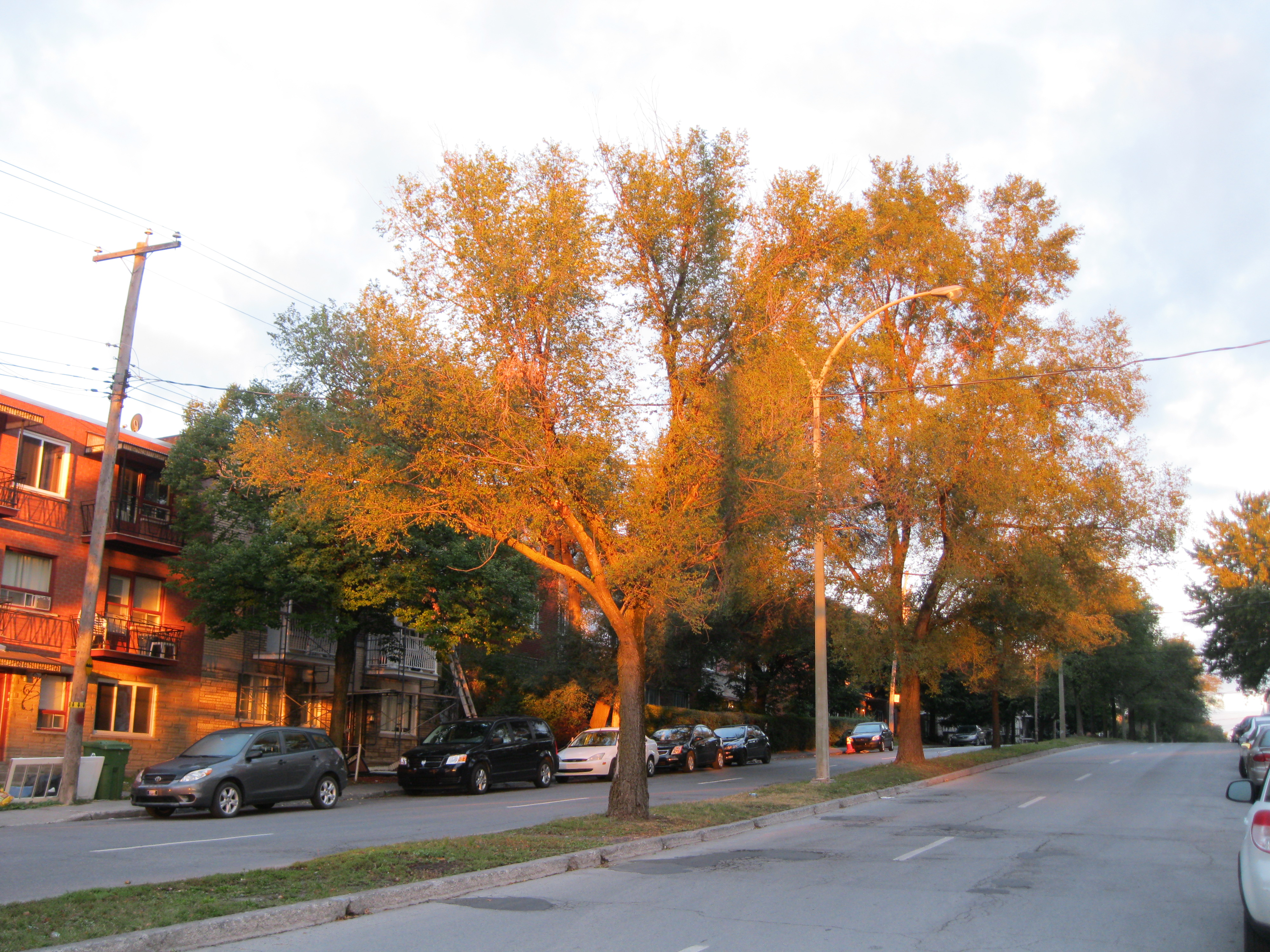
- Langelier Boulevard in Longue-Pointe
- Interactive map of Longue-Pointe

Longue-Pointe (French pronunciation: [lɔ̃g pwɛ̃t]) was a Montreal neighbourhood now located in the borough of Mercier-Hochelaga-Maisonneuve. The neighborhood was permanently divided by the construction of the Louis-Hippolyte Lafontaine Tunnel. Most of its territory is now part of the Mercier-Ouest while some of the area that fell east of the highway is now within Mercier-Est.

It is best known for its military base, CFB Longue-Pointe, the supply depot for all of Eastern Canada's armed forces. Around 2000 civilians and soldiers work at CFB Longue Pointe.

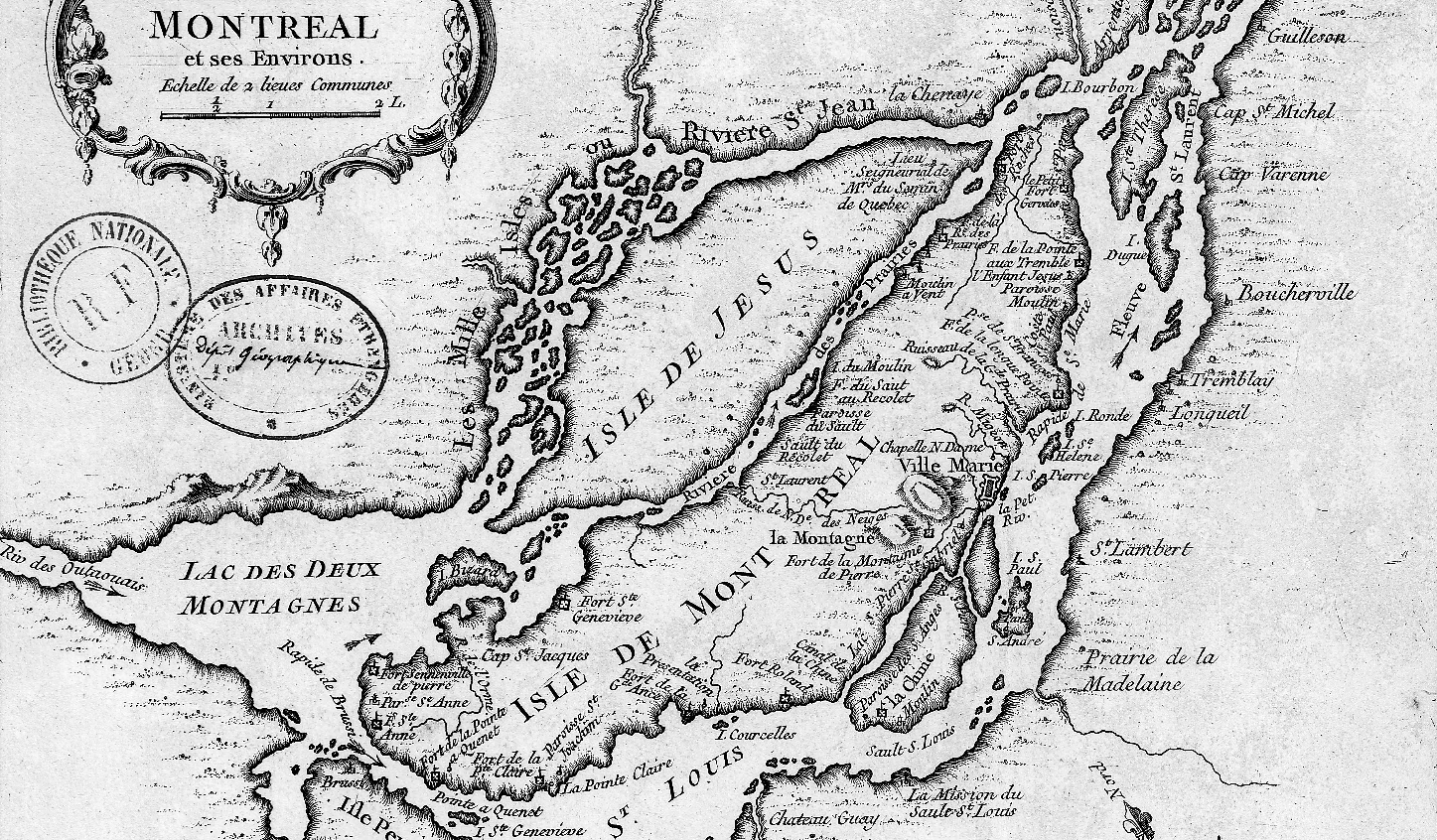
The Isle of Montreal in 1764. Longue Pointe is opposite Longueuil, which is on the right side of the map.

Longue-Pointe was the site of a famous battle in the American Revolutionary War in 1775, in which Ethan Allen made an ill-fated attempt to capture Montreal from the Kingdom of Great Britain.
