= Canadian Military Engineers =

Unified military engineering branch of the Canadian Armed Forces

- Génie militaire canadien
- Personnel branch badge
- Active: 1903–present
- Country: Canada
- Branch: Canadian Armed Forces
- Type: Military engineering
- Role: Primary: To permit friendly forces to live, move and fight on the field of battle and to deny the same to the enemy.; Secondary: To fight as infantry when required.
- Size: 46 squadron
- Home station: Arcadia, New Brunswick
- Motto: Ubique (Latin for 'everywhere.') "Chimo" is also often used.
- March: "Wings"
- Anniversaries: 4 December, St. Barbara's Day

The Canadian Military Engineers (CME; French: Génie militaire canadien) is the military engineering personnel branch of the Canadian Armed Forces. The members of the branch that wear army uniform comprise the Corps of Royal Canadian Engineers (RCE; French: Corps du génie royal canadien).

The mission of the Canadian Military Engineers is to contribute to the survival, mobility, and combat effectiveness of the Canadian Armed Forces. Their roles are to conduct combat operations, support the Canadian Forces in war and peace, support national development, provide assistance to civil authorities, and support international aid programs. Military engineers' responsibilities encompass the use of demolitions and land mines, the design, construction and maintenance of defensive works and fortifications, urban operations (hostile room entry), breaching obstacles, establishing/maintaining lines of communication, and bridging. They also provide water, power and other utilities, provide fire, aircraft crash and rescue services, hazardous material operations, and develop maps and other engineering intelligence. In addition, military engineers are experts in deception and concealment, as well as in the design and development of equipment necessary to carry out these operations. The official role of the combat engineer is to allow friendly troops to live, move and fight on the battlefield and deny that to the enemy.

== History ==
=== Local militia engineering companies 1855–1903 ===
With the passing of the 1855 Militia Act, volunteer militia engineering companies formed within local militia units:

- Halifax: two companies
- Montreal: one company (1st Volunteer Militia Engineering Company)
- Ottawa: one company
- Quebec: one company

=== Creation ===
Following the Boer War the Canadian Government realized that the defence of Canada required more than just a single infantry battalion and a few artillery batteries as part of the permanent defence force. In 1903 The Royal Canadian Engineers were founded as the basis of the permanent military engineers, while the militia had the Royal Canadian Engineers created under the leadership of a former Royal Military College of Canada officer cadet, Lieutenant-Colonel Paul Weatherbe.

=== First World War ===
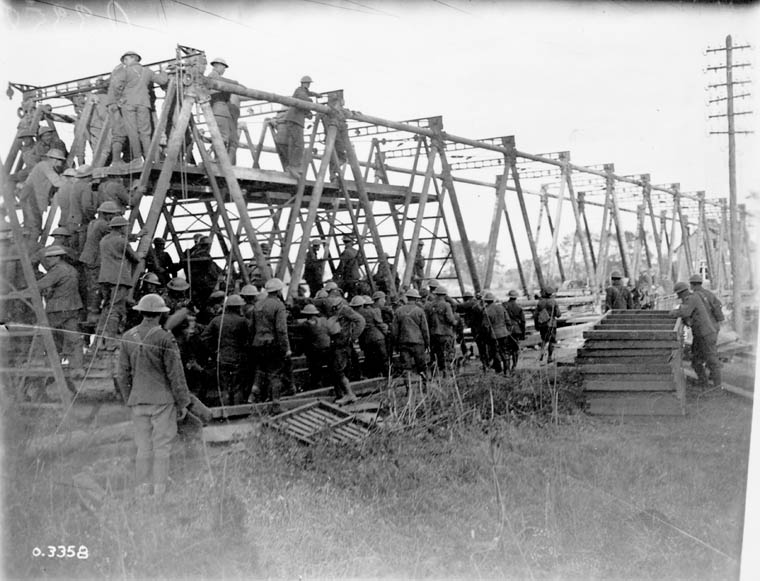
Canadian engineers building a bridge across the Canal du Nord, France, in 1918

One of the first tasks completed by the engineers after the declaration of war upon the German Empire in 1914 was for the rapid development of the Valcartier training site in Quebec. At its peak size, 30,000 men were stationed here before the 1st Canadian Division was deployed to England.

When the 1st Division arrived on the front in Belgium they were accompanied by field companies of the Canadian Engineers (men recruited into the service after the start of the war were part of the Militia branch and not the regulars). These troops were responsible for the construction of defences, sanitation systems, water supplies, bridging, and assisting with trench raids. Canadian Engineers also served in the Middle East fighting the Turks.

One of the most important functions of the sappers in the war was to dig tunnels for mines underneath enemy trenches, with which to plant explosives to destroy them. At the Battle of Vimy Ridge, and particularly at the Battle of Messines, several such mines were used to win the battle. The Canadian Military Engineers contributed three tunnelling companies to the British Expeditionary Force: 1st Canadian Tunnelling Company, 2nd Canadian Tunnelling Company and 3rd Canadian Tunnelling Company. One was formed from men on the battlefield, while two other companies first trained in Canada and were then shipped to France.

The only Victoria Cross the Canadian Engineers have ever received was earned by Captain Coulson Norman Mitchell for actions on 8 October 1918 at Canal de L'Escaut, north-east of Cambrai.

In total, more than 40,000 Canadians served as engineers in the war, with 14,000 on the front on the last day of the war.

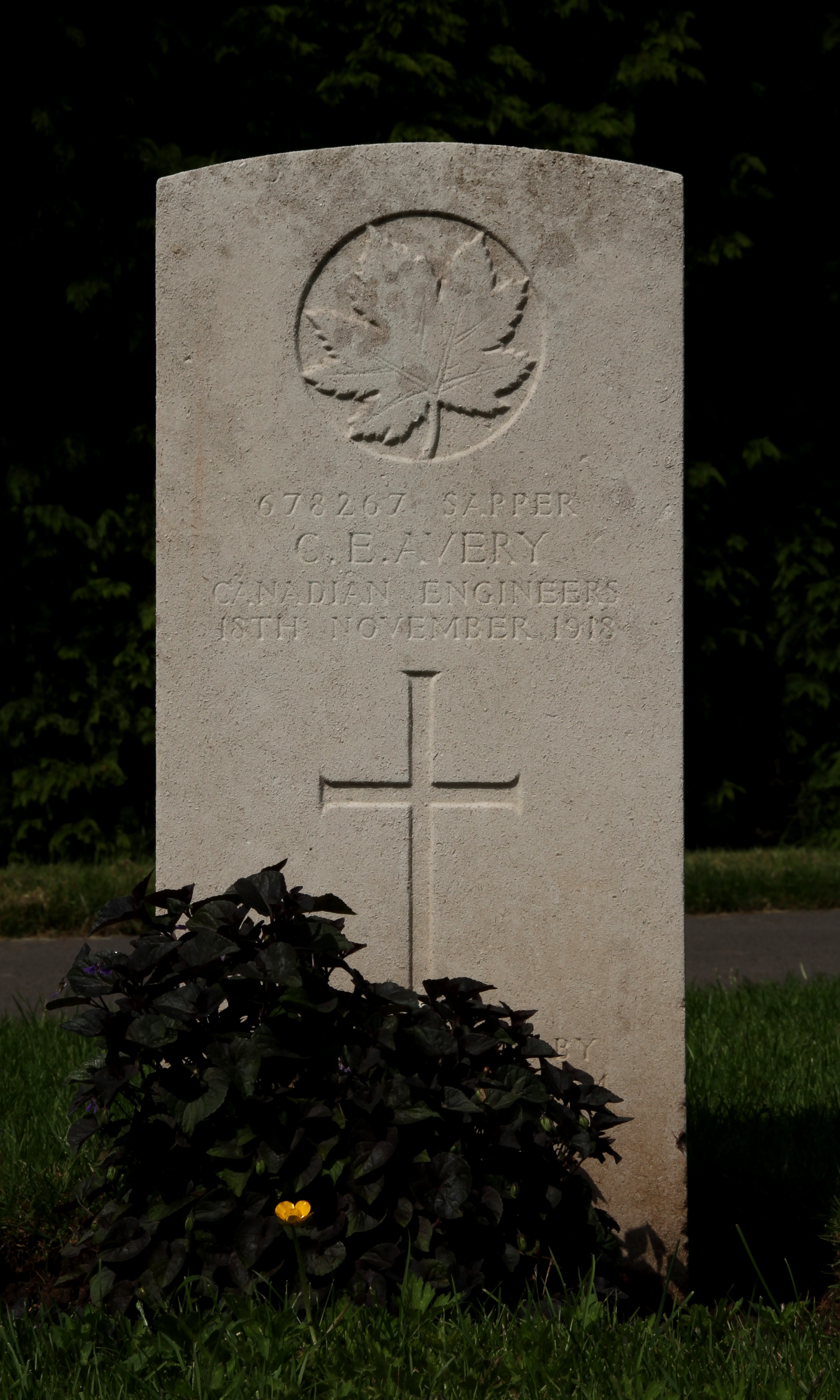
Grave in Cathays Cemetery, Cardiff, of Sapper CE Avery, who died a week after the Armistice in November 1918

On 1 June 2022, the perpetuation of No. 2 Construction Battalion, CEF, was assigned to the CME, with 4 Engineer Support Regiment having the honour of publicly recognizing the perpetuation.

=== Between the wars ===
Cypher used from 1953 to 1967.

On demobilization, the permanent force of Engineers was changed to 38 officers and 249 other ranks. As a matter of honour, King George V, the Canadian monarch bestowed on the organization the right to use the prefix royal before its name in 1932. On 29 April 1936, the Militia and Permanent components were joined to form the Corps of Royal Canadian Engineers. On this date the Militia adopted the cap badge used by the regulars.

=== Second World War ===
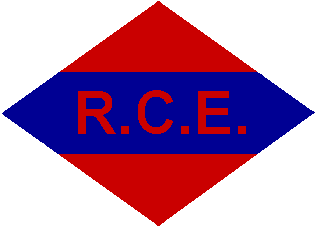
The formation patch worn by Royal Canadian Engineers attached to the First Canadian Army in World War II.

The Corps of Royal Canadian Engineers expanded dramatically in size to support Canada's war effort. On August 31, 1939, the Permanent Force engineers included 50 officers (with 14 seconded to other branches of the Canadian Army) and 323 other ranks; the maximum size of the Corps was reached in 1944, when it included 210 officers and 6283 other ranks.

In keeping with British Army practice, company-sized units in the two armoured divisions were called "squadrons" following cavalry terminology. The following units were deployed in Canada and in Europe:

- 1st Canadian Infantry Division
  - 1st Field Company
  - 3rd Field Company
  - 4th Field Company
  - 2nd Field Park Company
- 2nd Canadian Infantry Division
  - 2nd Field Company
  - 7th Field Company
  - 11th Field Company
  - 1st Field Park Company
- 3rd Canadian Infantry Division
  - 6th Field Company
  - 16th Field Company
  - 18th Field Company
  - 3rd Field Park Company
- 4th Canadian Armoured Division
  - 8th Field Squadron
  - 9th Field Squadron
  - 6th Field Park Squadron
- 5th Canadian Armoured Division
  - 1st Field Squadron
  - 10th Field Squadron
  - 4th Field Park Squadron
- 6th Canadian Infantry Division in Pacific Command
  - 20th Field Company
  - 25th Field Company
  - 26th Field Company
  - 7th Field Park Company
- 7th Canadian Infantry Division in Atlantic Command
  - 15th Field Company
  - 23rd Field Company
  - 27th Field Company
  - 5th Field Park Company
- 8th Canadian Infantry Division in Pacific Command
  - 21st Field Company
  - 24th Field Company
- I Canadian Corps
  - 12th Field Company
  - 13th Field Company
  - 14th Field Company
  - 9th Field Park Company
  - 1st Drilling Company
- II Canadian Corps
  - 29th Field Company
  - 30th Field Company
  - 31st Field Company
  - 8th Field Park Company
  - 2nd Drilling Company
- First Canadian Army
  - First Canadian Army Troops Engineers
    - 5th Field Company (unit code 1207)
    - 20th Field Company (unit code 1208)
    - 23rd Field Company (unit code 1209)
    - 10th Field Park Company (unit code 1210)
  - 2nd Canadian Army Troops Engineers
    - 32nd Field Company
    - 33rd Field Company
    - 34th Field Company
    - 11th Field Park Company
  - No. 1 Workshop and Park Company
  - 1st Field (Air) Survey Company
  - 2nd Field Survey Company
  - 3rd Field (Reproduction) Survey Company
- General Headquarters (GHQ) and Line of Communication (LoC) Troops
  - 1st Mechanical Equipment Company
  - 1st Mechanical Equipment Park Company
  - 2nd Battalion
  - 3rd Battalion
  - 1st Road Construction Company
  - 2nd Road Construction Company
  - No. 1 Railway Operating Company
  - No. 1 Railway Workshop Company
- Other units
  - 1st Chemical Warfare Company (in Canada, September 1942 – 31 August 1943)
  - 2nd Chemical Warfare Company (in Canada, September 1942 – 31 August 1943)
  - No.1 Tunnelling Company R.C.E. (in Gibraltar)
  - No.2 Tunnelling Company R.C.E. (in Gibraltar)

The senior officers of the Corps in World War II were as follows:

- Chief Engineer, First Canadian Army
  - Major-General Charles Sumner Lund Hertzberg (6 April 1942 – 23 June 1943)
  - Brigadier James Learmont Melville (24 June 1943 – October 1943)
  - Brigadier Allister Thompson MacLean (20 October 1943 – 1 September 1944)
  - Brigadier Geoffrey Walsh (2 September 1944 – 20 July 1945)
  - Colonel Henry Lloyd Meuser (Acting Chief Engineer, 21 July 1945 – 31 December 1945)
- Chief Engineer, I Canadian Corps
  - Brigadier Charles Sumner Lund Hertzberg (25 December 1940 – 6 April 1942)
  - Brigadier James Learmont Melville (6 April 1942 – October 1943)
  - Brigadier Alan Burton Connelly (1943–1944)
  - Brigadier Colin Alexander Campbell (27 July 1944 – 23 April 1945)
  - Brigadier John Despard Christian (24 April 1945 – 17 July 1945)
- Chief Engineer, II Canadian Corps
  - Brigadier Allister Thompson MacLean (1943)
  - Brigadier William Norman Archibald Bostock (1943–1944)
  - Brigadier Geoffrey Walsh (13 February 1944 – 1 September 1944)
  - Brigadier Dudley Kingdon Black (2 September 1944 – 16 June 1945)

=== Post-Korea, Unification and the Cold War ===
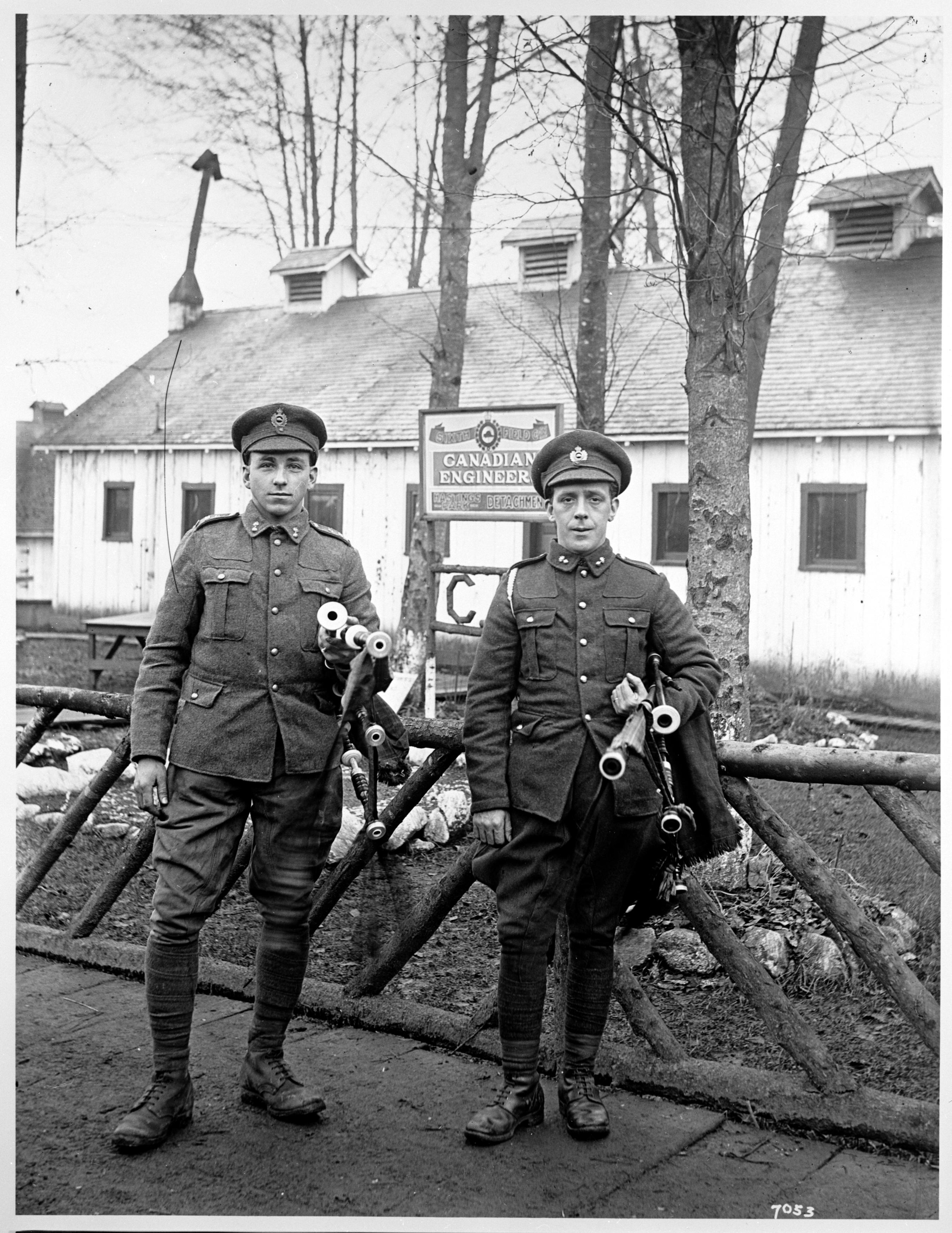
Two military engineers with bagpipes in front of the Canadian Engineers Building at Hastings Park, 1915.

The branch maintained a military band in its ranks from 1953 to 1968. During its 15 years in existence, the band performed for members of the Canadian royal family, Governors General of Canada including Georges Vanier, and American President Lyndon B. Johnson. In 1968, the band was dissolved, with most being sent to the Royal Canadian Navy.

On 1 February 1968, the Canadian Army, Royal Canadian Navy, and Royal Canadian Air Force were officially unified as the Canadian Armed Forces. As such the Royal Canadian Engineers, Royal Canadian Navy Civil Engineers and Royal Canadian Air Force Construction Division were amalgamated. However, the new branch went under the name Royal Canadian Engineers until 1973 when the branch was officially named as the Canadian Military Engineers.

The present day structure of army field units was set on 17 June 1977 with the creation of 1 Combat Engineer Regiment (1 CER), 2 CER, 4 ESR and 5 CER. The new regiments were each created from one of the squadrons of the former 1 Field Engineer Regiment.

=== 21st century ===
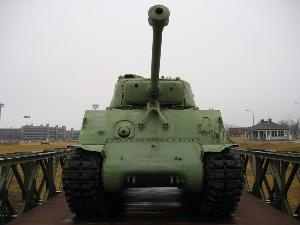
Bailey bridge at Royal Military College of Canada built in 2004 by members of the 2nd Field Engineer Regiment of Toronto to commemorate the 100th Anniversary of the Canadian Military Engineers

The role of the Canadian Military Engineers has been expanding. The regular force component has been expanding the size of their units, due to the current missions of the Canadian Armed Forces.

In April 1997, Canada's Primary Reserve reorganized into ten brigade groups and in November 1997, the first reserve combat engineer regiment was created by converting an armoured reconnaissance regiment. A number of years later the three field engineer regiments, and seven independent field engineer squadrons were reorganized into combat engineer regiments. Three Canadian brigade groups had more than one engineer unit, and one (38 Canadian Brigade Group) did not have any units at all. Now the field engineer regiments have been redesignated or amalgamated to become combat engineer regiments, and the field engineer squadrons have either been amalgamated to make new combat engineer regiments or reroled as generic engineer squadrons.

38 CBG previously had 21st Field Engineer Squadron, based in Flin Flon, Manitoba. It was however disbanded in 1995. In 2003, the Fort Garry Horse in Winnipeg, Manitoba, began hosting what became 31 Engineer Squadron in 2012. The brigade formed 46 Engineer Squadron in Saskatoon in 2012, which was a subunit of the North Saskatchewan Regiment until it gained full strength. Both squadrons are now subunits of 38 Combat Engineer Regiment.

The deployment in Afghanistan required considerable use of engineers for road clearance, explosive ordnance disposal, heavy equipment, and combat support. By the end of the deployment 16 members of the RCE had been killed in Afghanistan.

In April 2013, the title Corps of Royal Canadian Engineers was brought back for the army element of the branch.

== Customs and traditions ==
=== Colonel-in-chief ===
Queen Elizabeth II, Queen of Canada, was the colonel-in-chief of the CME until her death in 2022. King George V, Edward VIII, and George VI all served as previous colonels-in-chief of the Royal Canadian Engineers.

=== Mottos ===
King George V granted the CME the same mottoes as the Royal Engineers.

Ubique (Latin, "Everywhere") serves as a substitution for the battle honours the corps would have obtained if they were a line regiment.

Quo fas et gloria ducunt (Latin, "Whither right and glory lead")

=== Cap badge ===
From shortly after their creation until 1967, the Royal Canadian Engineers had a nearly identical cap badge to the Royal Engineers. This consisted of the Cipher of the Reigning monarch, surrounded by the Garter, surmounted by the crown with the words Royal Canadian Engineers on the scroll at the bottom, and surrounded by maple leaves instead of laurels.

The cap badge came to its current form after unification. Since the Royal Canadian Engineer cap badge was representative only of the army, a new one was developed, which is almost identical to that worn by the (Army's) non-permanent Canadian Engineers prior to the Great War (which was not bilingual and did not use enamel). In bilingual format, the words Engineers and Génie appear on the cap badge indicating the bilingual nature of the CME. The word Ubique also appears, a motto inherited by engineers and artillery in the Canadian military from their British forebears.

From the 1960s to the late 1980s or early 1990s, the branch badge was enamel-highlighted cast metal with a prong-type slider to attach to both the beret and forage cap. The collar dogs (worn only on army uniforms after introduction of distinctive environmental uniforms) were miniatures of the cap badge. By 1998, the metal cap badge had been replaced by an embroidered cloth version which was sewn directly to the beret. Collar dogs were replaced by a crouching beaver over the motto Ubique. Left- and right-facing beavers are required for a complete set.

=== Chimo ===
The CME/RCE greeting or toast is "chimo" (/ˈtʃiːmoʊ/ CHEE-moh). This expression is also often used as a closing on correspondence between engineers. The word chimo is derived from the Inuktitut greeting: saimo (saimu) that means "hello," "goodbye," "peace be with you," and similar sentiments. This salutation was used in the Ungava region of northern Quebec and shares the same derivation as Fort Chimo (today Kuujjuaq) on Ungava Bay in northern Quebec. The current spelling and pronunciation result from the English and French languages importing the loanword from Inuktitut. On April 1, 1946, the Canadian Army assumed responsibility for the portions of the Alaska Highway that lay within Canadian boundaries. This section of the highway was renamed the "Northwest Highway System" and the responsibility for maintenance was given to the Royal Canadian Engineers for the next 20 years. The soldiers of the CME/RCE adopted the greeting of "chimo" and in 1973 it became the cheer of the CME.

=== CME Flag ===

The present CME flag was created at the time of unification. It measures six "units" long by three "units" high, and is in the colours of brick red and royal blue.

=== Engineer Prayer ===
The Engineer Prayer was created for 2 Field Engineer Regiment by Major Hugh Macdonald, the unit's padre. It goes as follows:

Almighty God, we pray thee to bless the Canadian Military Engineers. May our bridges always stand, and our charges never fail, our members be ever loyal, and our officers worthy of their loyalty. May we work diligently in all our purposes and be skilled in our trades; steadfast for King and Country everywhere. Amen.

=== Patron saint ===
The Canadian Military Engineers have no patron saint but Engineers often take part in artillery celebrations honouring St. Barbara, the patron saint of the artillery. Engineers, along with the artillery and miners, celebrate her feast day on December 4. St. Barbara is the patroness of artillerymen, fireworks manufacturers, firemen, stonemasons, against sudden death, against fires, and against storms (especially lightning storms).

== Equipment ==
The CME/RCE has various equipment for use in supporting the Canadian Forces at home and on deployment overseas.

For more refer to Engineering and support vehicles of the Canadian Forces.

== Training ==
=== Canadian Forces School of Military Engineering ===
The Canadian Forces School of Military Engineering (CFSME) at CFB Gagetown in Oromocto, New Brunswick is responsible for the conduct of 85 different courses that span all ranks and occupations within the Field, Construction and Airfield Engineer organizations. CFSME is the Canadian Forces Centre of Excellence in Engineer Training and home of the Engineers.

== Units ==
=== Regular Force units ===
Unit	Headquarters	Sub-Units
Canadian Forces School of Military Engineering	CFB Gagetown, New Brunswick	Field Engineering Training Squadron; Construction Engineering Training Squadron; Reserve Engineer Training Squadron; Tactics Squadron; Construction Engineering and Management Squadron; Explosive Ordnance Disposal Squadron; Army Dive Centre; Standards Squadron; Administration Squadron
1 Combat Engineer Regiment	CFB Edmonton, Alberta	11 Field Squadron; 12 Field Squadron; 17 Armoured Squadron; 15 Support Squadron; 18 Administration Squadron
2 Combat Engineer Regiment	CFB Petawawa, Ontario	23 Field Squadron; 24 Field Squadron (Light); 25 Support Squadron; 28 Administration Squadron
4 Engineer Support Regiment	CFB Gagetown, New Brunswick	42 Field Squadron; 43 Counter Explosive Threat Squadron; 45 Engineer Support Squadron; 48 Combat Service Support Squadron
5 Combat Engineer Regiment	CFB Valcartier, Quebec	51 Field Squadron; 52 Field Squadron; 53 Light Field Squadron; 55 Support Squadron; 58 Administration Squadron
4 Construction Engineer Squadron	CFB Cold Lake, Alberta	N/A
8 Construction Engineer Squadron	CFB Trenton, Ontario	N/A
19 Construction Engineering Squadron	CFB Comox, British Columbia	191 Construction Engineering Flight; 195 Aircraft Rescue Fire Fighting Flight
1 Engineering Support Unit	Kingston, Ontario	N/A
Mapping And Charting Establishment	Ottawa, Ontario	N/A
Canadian Forces Fire Academy	CFB Borden, Ontario	N/A
Pacific Naval Construction Troop	CFB Esquimalt, British Columbia	N/A
Naval Construction Troop	CFB Halifax, Nova Scotia	N/A

=== Reserve Force units ===
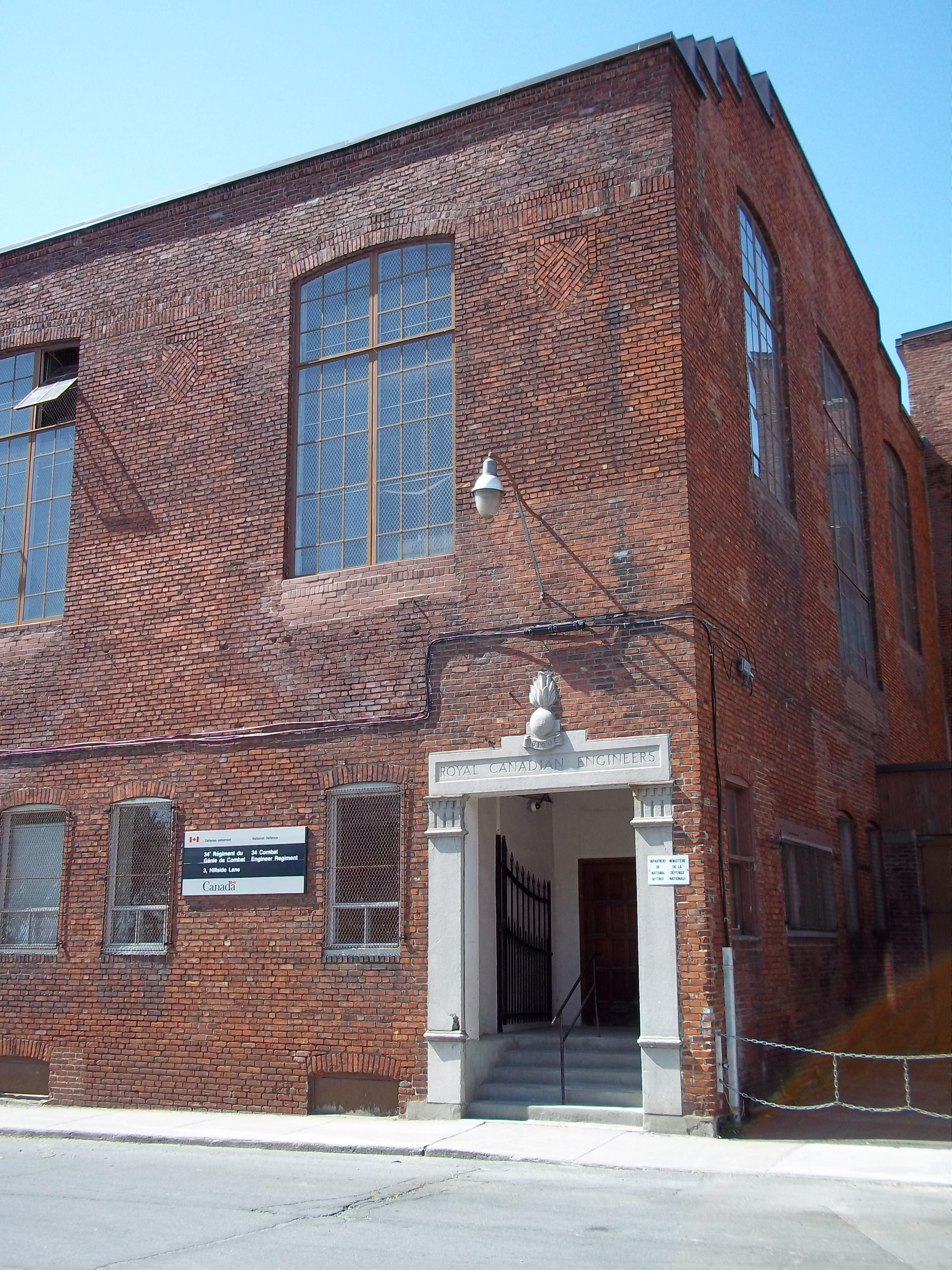
Armoury of 34 Combat Engineer Regiment (Westmount, Quebec)

Unit	Headquarters	Sub-Units
31 Combat Engineer Regiment (The Elgins)	St. Thomas, Ontario	7 Engineer Squadron (St. Thomas, Ontario); 48 Engineer Squadron (Waterloo, Ontario)
32 Combat Engineer Regiment	Toronto, Ontario	2 Engineer Squadron; 47 Engineer Squadron (Training and Recruiting)
33 Combat Engineer Regiment	Ottawa, Ontario	3 Engineer Squadron; 5 Engineer Squadron
34 Combat Engineer Regiment	Westmount, Quebec	4 Engineer Squadron (Westmount, Quebec); 9 Engineer Squadron (Rouyn-Noranda, Quebec); 16 Engineer Squadron (Training and Recruiting) (Westmount, Quebec)
35 Combat Engineer Regiment	Quebec City, Quebec	10 Engineer Squadron; 15 Engineer Squadron
36 Combat Engineer Regiment	CFB Shearwater, Nova Scotia	20 Engineer Squadron (Halifax, Nova Scotia); 45 Engineer Squadron (Sydney, Nova Scotia)
37 Combat Engineer Regiment	St. John's, Newfoundland & Fredericton, New Brunswick	1 Engineer Squadron (Fredericton, New Brunswick); 56 Engineer Squadron and Regimental Headquarters (St. John's, Newfoundland)
38 Combat Engineer Regiment	Winnipeg, Manitoba	31 Engineer Squadron (Winnipeg, Manitoba); 46 Engineer Squadron (Saskatoon, Saskatchewan)
39 Combat Engineer Regiment	North Vancouver, British Columbia	6 Engineer Squadron (North Vancouver, British Columbia); 44 Engineer Squadron (Trail and Cranbrook, British Columbia); 54 Engineer Squadron (Chilliwack, British Columbia)
41 Combat Engineer Regiment	Edmonton, Alberta	25 Engineer Squadron (Edmonton, Alberta); 33 Engineer Squadron (Calgary, Alberta)
14 Construction Engineer Squadron	Bridgewater, Nova Scotia	91 Construction Engineer Flight (Gander, Newfoundland); 143 Construction Engineer Flight (Bridgewater, Nova Scotia); 144 Construction Engineer Flight (Pictou County, Nova Scotia); 192 Construction Engineer Flight (Aldergrove, British Columbia)

== Order of precedence ==
Preceded by Royal Canadian Artillery	Canadian Military Engineers	Succeeded by Communications and Electronics Branch

== See also ==
- List of Canadian organizations with royal prefix
- Royal Engineers, Columbia Detachment
- Royal Engineers
- Royal Australian Engineers
- Corps of Royal New Zealand Engineers
- South African Army Engineer Formation
- Indian Army Corps of Engineers
- Pakistan Army Corps of Engineers
