= 35 Combat Engineer Regiment =

- Active: 23 November 2006 – Present
- Country: Canada
- Branch: Canadian Military Engineers
- Type: Combat engineers
- Part of: 35 Canadian Brigade Group
- Garrison/HQ: Quebec City, Quebec

Commanders
- Current commander: Lieutenant-Colonel Sébastien Dufresne
- Abbreviation: 35 CER

35 Combat Engineer Regiment (35CER) (French: 35^{e} Régiment du génie de combat) is a reserve unit of the Canadian Military Engineers in Quebec City, Quebec, Canada. It is part of the 35 Canadian Brigade Group, 2nd Canadian Division.

The unit was involved in training Ukrainian soldiers in mine disposal during the Russo-Ukrainian War.

== Order of precedence ==
Preceded by 34 Combat Engineer Regiment	35 Combat Engineer Regiment	Succeeded by 36 Combat Engineer Regiment of Canadian Military Engineers

== See also ==
- Military history of Canada
- History of the Canadian Army
- Canadian Forces
- List of armouries in Canada
