= 34 Canadian Brigade Group =

Brigade of the Canadian Army

- 34^{e} Groupe-brigade du Canada
- Badge of the brigade group
- Active: 1997–present
- Country: Canada
- Branch: Canadian Army
- Type: Brigade group
- Part of: 2nd Canadian Division
- Garrison/HQ: CFB Montreal
- Motto(s): Combattre, vaincre ou mourir (French for 'Fight, overcome or die')
- March: "Aïda"
- Website: canada.ca/en/army/corporate/2-canadian-division/34-canadian-brigade-group.html

Insignia
NATO map symbol
34 CBG
2 Cdn Div
- Abbreviation: 34 CBG

34 Canadian Brigade Group (34CBG; French: 34^{e} Groupe-brigade du Canada) is a Primary Reserve component of 2nd Canadian Division, under the Canadian Army. It is headquartered in Montreal, Quebec. It is the successor of the Cold War-era Montreal Militia District.

== Brigade units ==
| Unit | Role | Headquarters |
|---|---|---|
| 34 Canadian Brigade Group Headquarters | Headquarters | Montreal |
| The Royal Canadian Hussars (Montreal) | Reconnaissance | Montreal |
| Le Régiment de Hull (RCAC) | Reconnaissance | Gatineau |
| 2nd Field Artillery Regiment, RCA | Artillery | Montreal |
| 34 Combat Engineer Regiment | Combat engineer | Montreal |
| 34 Signal Regiment | Military communications | Westmount |
| The Canadian Grenadier Guards | Light infantry | Montreal |
| The Black Watch (Royal Highland Regiment) of Canada | Light infantry | Montreal |
| 4th Battalion, Royal 22^{e} Régiment (Châteauguay) | Light infantry | Laval |
| 6th Battalion, Royal 22^{e} Régiment | Light infantry | Saint-Hyacinthe |
| Les Fusiliers Mont-Royal | Light infantry | Montreal |
| Le Régiment de Maisonneuve | Light infantry | Montreal |
| The Royal Montreal Regiment | Light infantry | Westmount |
| 34 Service Battalion | Service and support | Saint-Hubert |

Cities with 34 CBG units

Units that support the 34 Canadian Brigade Group include the 438 Tactical Helicopter Squadron, 41 Military Police Platoon, the ASU Saint-Jean military police section and the 4 Intelligence Company.

== See also ==
- 35 Canadian Brigade Group, the other brigade in the province of Quebec.
- CFB Montreal
