= 34 Combat Engineer Regiment =

34 Combat Engineer Regiment 34^{e} Régiment du génie de combat
- Country: Canada
- Branch: Canadian Military Engineers
- Type: Combat engineer
- Part of: 34 Canadian Brigade Group
- Garrison/HQ: Longue-Pointe Garrison, Montreal; Rouyn-Noranda
- Mottos: Ubique (Latin, "Everywhere")
- March: Wings
- Mascot: Black Cat

Commanders
- Commander: LCol Daniel Doran, MMM, CD
- Regimental Sergeant Major: CWO Mike Golden, CD
- Honorary Colonel: Col Jennifer Stoddart
- Honorary Lieutenant-Colonel: LCol Gina Cody
- Abbreviation: 34 CER

34 Combat Engineer Regiment (34CER) is a reserve unit of the Royal Canadian Engineers in Montreal, and Rouyn-Noranda, Quebec, Canada. It is part of the 34 Canadian Brigade Group, 2nd Canadian Division.

The unit currently consists of:

- 4 Field Engineer Squadron (French: 4^{e} Escadron du génie)
- 9 Field Engineer Squadron (French: 9^{e} Escadron du génie)
- Command and Support Squadron

Preceded by 33 Combat Engineer Regiment	34 Combat Engineer Regiment	Succeeded by 35 Combat Engineer Regiment Royal Canadian Engineers

== See also ==
- Military history of Canada
- History of the Canadian Army
- Canadian Forces
- List of armouries in Canada
