= Régiment de la Chaudière =

Coordinates: 46°48′13″N 71°11′02″W

Le Régiment de la Chaudière
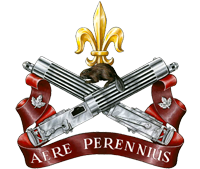
- Regimental badge depicting two crossed Vickers machine guns, surmounted by a beaver and a fleur-de-lys
- Active: 1869–present
- Country: Canada
- Branch: Canadian Army
- Type: Line infantry
- Role: Light infantry
- Garrison/HQ: Lévis, Quebec
- Motto: Ære perennius (Latin for 'More lasting than bronze')
- March: "Sambre et Meuse" and "The Longest Day"
- Engagements: Second World War; War in Afghanistan
- Battle honours: See #Battle honours

Commanders
- Colonel-in-Chief: Vacant

The Régiment de la Chaudière is a Primary Reserve infantry regiment of the Canadian Army. It is part of the 2nd Canadian Division's 35 Canadian Brigade Group and is headquartered at Lévis, Quebec.

== History ==
Regimental colour (prior to addition of 1812 and Afghanistan honours)

Camp flag

The regiment itself originated in Saint-Anselme, Quebec, on 9 April 1869, as The Provisional Battalion of "Dorchester". It was redesignated as the 92nd "Dorchester" Battalion of Infantry on 12 June 1885. On 1 August 1899, it was amalgamated with the 23rd "Beauce" Battalion of Infantry but retained the same designation. The 23rd "Beauce" Battalion of Infantry originated in Sainte-Marie, Quebec, on 9 April 1869. On 1 August 1899, it was amalgamated with the 92nd Dorchester Battalion of Infantry.

It was redesignated as the 92nd Dorchester Regiment on 8 May 1900; as Le Régiment de Dorchester on 29 March 1920; as The Beauce Regiment on 15 March 1921; as Le Régiment de Beauce on 1 May 1921; and as Le Régiment de Dorchester et Beauce on 1 February 1932. On 15 December 1936, it amalgamated with the 5th Machine Gun Battalion, CMGC and was redesignated as Le Régiment de la Chaudière (Mitrailleuses). It was redesignated as the 2nd (Reserve) Battalion, Le Régiment de la Chaudière (Mitrailleuses) on 7 November 1940; as the 2nd (Reserve) Battalion, Le Régiment de la Chaudière on 1 April 1941;

The 5th Machine Gun Battalion, CMGC originated in Quebec City, Quebec, on 1 June 1919, as the 5th Machine Gun Brigade, CMGC. It was redesignated as the 5th Machine Gun Battalion, CMGC on 15 September 1924. On 15 December 1936, it amalgamated with Le Régiment de Dorchester et Beauce.

=== World War II ===
Le Régiment de la Chaudière (Mitrailleuses) mobilized Le Régiment de la Chaudière (Mitrailleuses), a machine gun battalion, CASF on 1 September 1939. It was redesignated as Le Régiment de la Chaudière, CASF on 24 May 1940; and as the 1st Battalion, Le Régiment de la Chaudière, CASF on 7 November 1940. It embarked for Great Britain on 21 July 1941. On D-Day, 6 June 1944, it landed in Normandy, France as a part of the 8th Infantry Brigade, 3rd Canadian Infantry Division, and it continued to fight in North West Europe until the end of the war. The overseas battalion was disbanded on 15 January 1946. The unit was assigned to the 3rd Canadian Infantry Division as a standard rifle battalion and was designated as a reserve battalion during the D-Day landings in June 1944. Le Régiment de la Chaudière came ashore on the second wave at Bernières-sur-Mer after The Queen's Own Rifles of Canada, surprising the locals who hadn't expected to find francophone troops in the liberating forces. It was the only French-Canadian regiment to participate in Operation Overlord, and one of the few French-speaking units to come ashore that day alongside the bilingual The North Shore (New Brunswick) Regiment and the Free-French Commando Kieffer.

Citizens in Normandy were surprised to find that soldiers of the Chaudière spoke a type of French very close to that spoken in Normandy, but were puzzled by the regiment's name. In French, chaudière is the word for a water heater or boiler. The regiment was named for the Chaudière River, itself named for the "boiling" of a waterfall on the river.

The regiment participated in the Battle for Caen, suffering several casualties in the fight at Carpiquet airfield on 4 July 1944.

With the rest of the division, the regiment fought in the Battle of the Scheldt, notably in actions in the Breskens Pocket between 6 October and 3 November 1944.

The unit wintered in the Nijmegen Salient and was again active in the Rhineland fighting in February 1945, and finished the war on German soil in May.

A 2nd Battalion served in the Reserve Army. A 3rd Battalion was raised for the Canadian Army Occupation Force.

The regiment was renamed as Le Régiment de la Chaudière on 24 April 1946. On 1 September 1954, it was amalgamated with Le Régiment de Lévis but retained the same designation. Le Régiment de Lévis originated in Lévis, Quebec, on 1 December 1902, as the 17th Regiment of Infantry. It was redesignated as Le Régiment de Lévis on 29 March 1920; as the 2nd (Reserve) Battalion, Le Régiment de Lévis on 12 May 1942; and as Le Régiment de Lévis on 7 November 1945 before amalgamation.

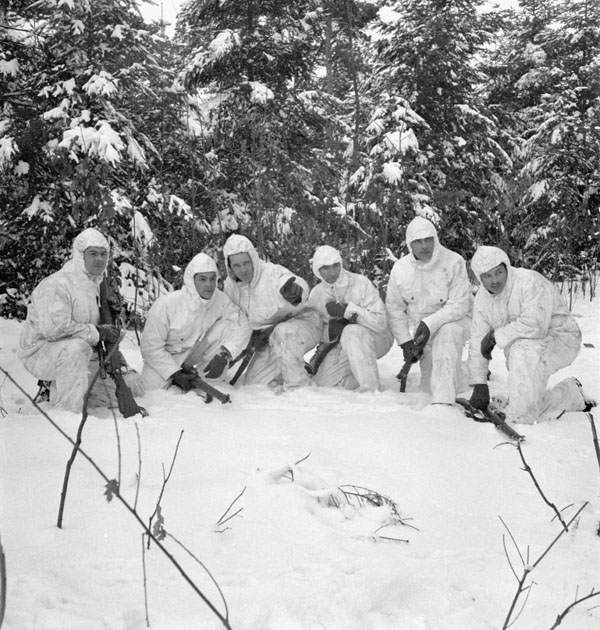
Infantrymen of the Régiment de la Chaudière, who are wearing British winter camouflage clothing, on patrol, Berg en dal, Netherlands, January 24, 1945

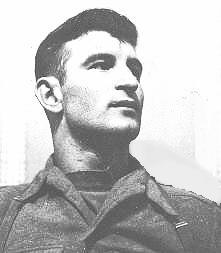
Sergeant Léo Major

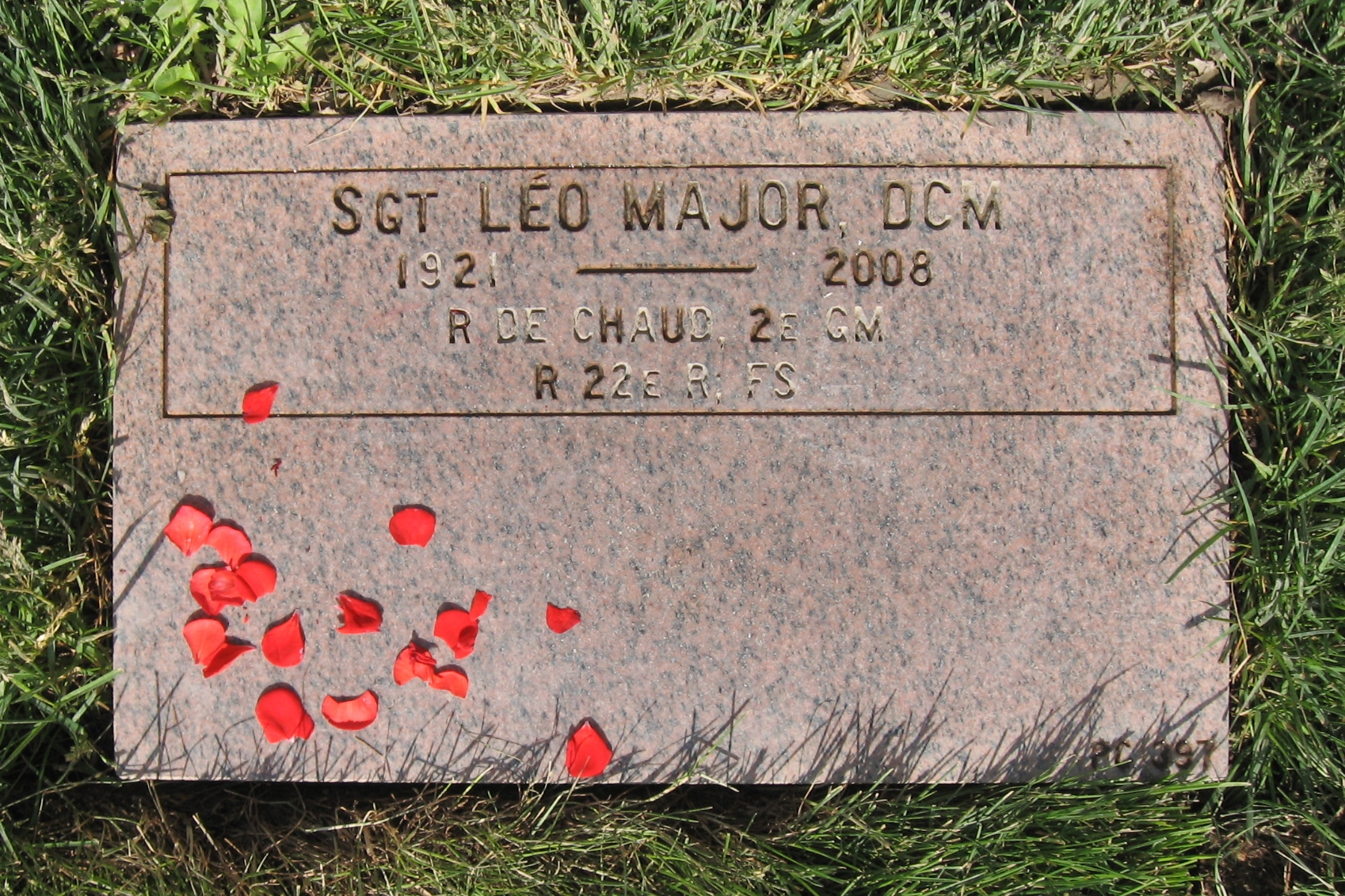
Grave of Sgt Léo Major

=== War In Afghanistan ===
The regiment contributed an aggregate of more than 20% of its authorized strength to the various Task Forces which served in Afghanistan between 2002 and 2014.

== Perpetuations ==
Le Régiment de la Chaudière perpetuates three units (1st Battalion, Select Embodied Militia, Dorchester Provincial Light Dragoons and the 1st Lotbinière Division) from the War of 1812 and as such carries Battle Honours which recognize the service of those previous units during the War of 1812 and, in particular, at the Battle of the Chateauguay.

- 1st Battalion, Select Embodied Militia
- Dorchester Provincial Light Dragoons
- 1st Lotbinière Division

== Battle honours ==
In the list below, battle honours in small capitals were awarded for participation in large operations and campaigns, while those in lowercase indicate honours granted for more specific battles. Those battle honours in bold type are emblazoned on the regimental colour.

The regimental colour (prior to addition of 1812 and Afghanistan honours).

War of 1812

- Defence of Canada – **1812–1815** – **Défense du Canada**
- **Châteauguay**

The non-emblazonable honorary distinction Defence of Canada – 1812–1815 – Défense du Canada

Second World War

- **Normandy Landing**
- Caen
- **Carpiquet**
- Bourguébus Ridge
- **Faubourg de Vaucelles**
- **Falaise**
- The Laison
- Chambois
- **Boulogne, 1944**
- Calais, 1944
- **The Scheldt**
- Breskens Pocket
- **The Rhineland**
- Waal Flats
- **The Hochwald**
- The Rhine
- **Emmerich–Hoch Elten**
- **Zutphen**
- North-West Europe, 1944–1945

South-West Asia

- **Afghanistan**

== Lineage ==
Lineage chart

1812	1st Bn, Select Embodied Militia	Dorchester Provincial Light Dragoons	1st Lotbinière Div.
1815	Disbanded	Disbanded	Disbanded
1868	Independent infy coys	Independent infy coys
1869	The Provisional Bn of "Dorchester"	The Provisional Bn of "Beauce"
1871	23rd "Beauce" Bn of Infy
1885	92nd "Dorchester" Bn of Infy
1899	92nd "Dorchester" Bn of Infy
1900	92nd Dorchester Regt
1902	17th Regt of Infy
1919	5th MG Bde, CMGC
1920	1st Bn, Le Rég^{t} de Dorchester	2nd Bn, (Note: Reserve) Le Rég^{t} de Dorchester	1st Bn, Le Rég^{t} de Lévis	2nd Bn, Le Rég^{t} de Lévis
1921	1st Bn, The Beauce Regt	2nd Bn, The Beauce Regt
1921	1st Bn, Le Rég^{t} de Beauce	2nd Bn, Le Rég^{t} de Beauce
1924	5th MG Bn, CMGC
1932	1st Bn, Le Rég^{t} de Dorchester et Beauce	2nd Bn, Le Rég^{t} de Dorchester et Beauce
1936	Disbanded	Disbanded
1936	Le Rég^{t} de la Chaudière (Mitrailleuses)	Le Rég^{t} de Lévis
1939	Le Rég^{t} de la Chaudière (Mitrailleuses), CASF
1940	Le Rég^{t} de la Chaudière, CASF
1940	1st Bn, Le Rég^{t} de la Chaudière, CASF	2nd (Reserve) Bn, Le Rég^{t} de la Chaudière (Mitrailleuses)
1941	2nd (Reserve) Bn, Le Rég^{t} de la Chaudière
1942	1st Bn, Le Rég^{t} de Lévis, CASF	2nd (Reserve) Bn, Le Rég^{t} de Lévis
1943	Disbanded
1945	3rd Bn, Le Rég^{t} de la Chaudière, CIC, CAOF	Le Rég^{t} de Lévis
1946	Disbanded	Le Rég^{t} de la Chaudière	Disbanded
1954	Le Rég^{t} de la Chaudière
2012	Perpetuates War of 1812 units

== Régiment de la Chaudière museum ==
Régiment de la Chaudière museum
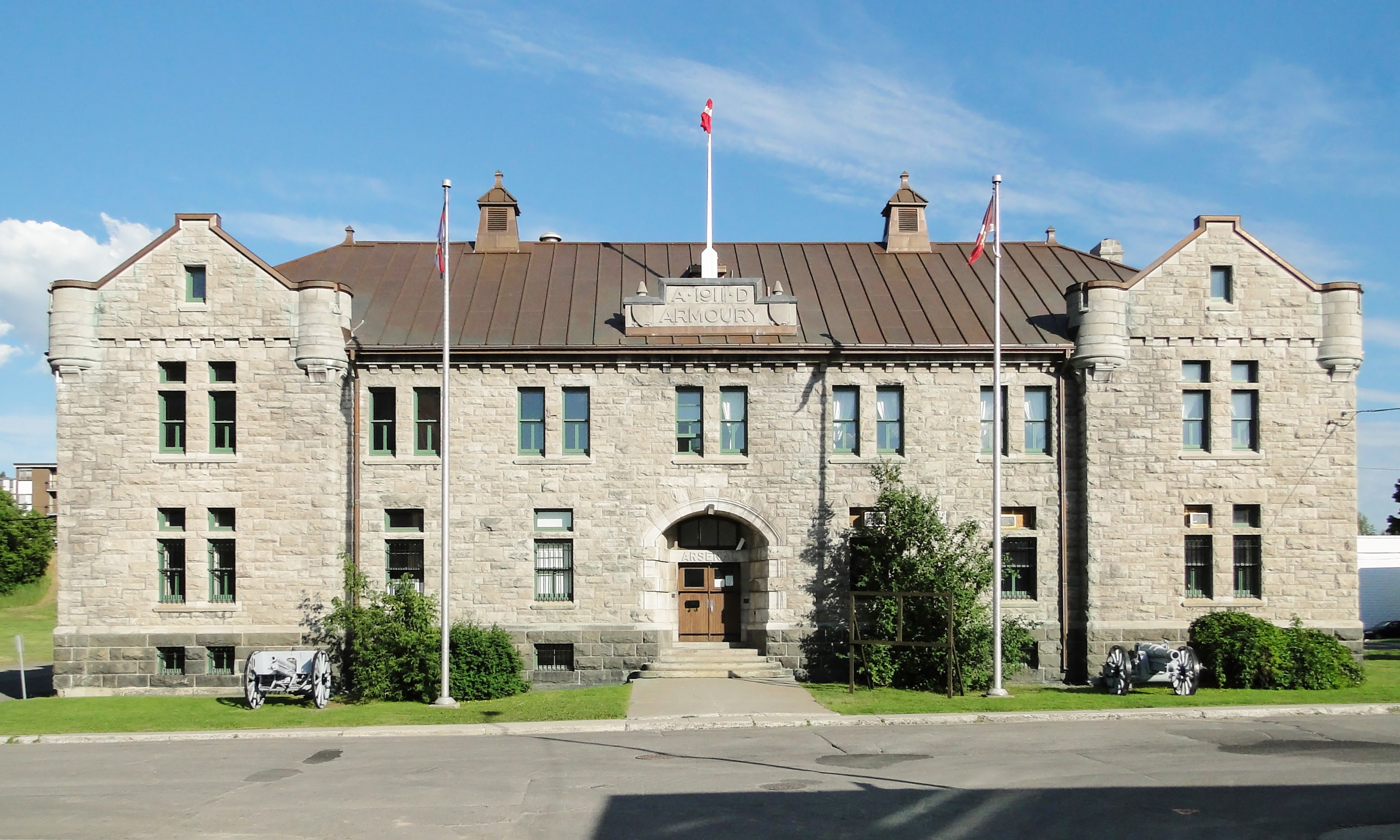
- Location: Lévis Armoury, 10 Arsenal Street, Lévis, QC G6V 4P7 Canada
- Type: Regimental Museum

The museum researches, collects, preserves and interprets as many artifacts as possible which illustrate the military life, particularly during the war in Europe, 1944–1945. The museum displays and describes arms, uniforms, equipment and customs of Le Régiment de la Chaudière from its founding and that of its antecedents.

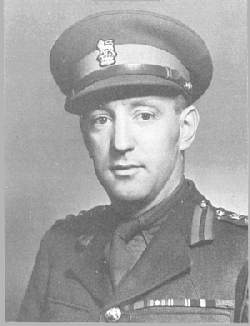
Paul Mathieu, DSO, ED from Archives of Museum of Régiment de la Chaudière

== Media ==
- Le Régiment de la Chaudière by Jacques & Armand Ross Castonguay (1983)
- Le Geste Du Régiment De La Chaudière by Major Armand, Major Michel Gauvin Ross and Georges Lepage (1945)

== Order of precedence ==
Preceded by Les Fusiliers du S^{t}-Laurent	Le Régiment de la Chaudière	Succeeded by 4^{e} Bataillon, Royal 22^{e} Régiment (Châteauguay)

== Notable people ==
- Sergeant Léo Major DCM
- Pierre Paul-Hus
