= 33 Canadian Brigade Group =

Brigade of the Canadian Army

- 33^{e} Groupe-brigade du Canada
- Badge of the brigade group
- Active: 1 April 1997 – present
- Country: Canada
- Branch: Canadian Army
- Part of: 2nd Canadian Division
- Garrison/HQ: Ottawa, Ontario
- Motto: Fortes soli – fortiores una (Latin for 'Strong alone - Stronger together')
- March: "Killaloe"
- Website: www.canada.ca/en/army/corporate/4-canadian-division/33-canadian-brigade-group.html

Commanders
- Brigade commander: Colonel Finley Mullally, CD
- Brigade Sergent Major: Chief Warrant Officer Sarah Surtees, CD
- Notable commanders: Colonel James McKay

Insignia
NATO Map Symbol
33 CBG
2 Cdn Div
- Abbreviation: 33 CBG

33 Canadian Brigade Group of the Canadian Army is part of 2nd Canadian Division. It commands the Primary Reserve units in eastern and northern portions of Ontario. It was established in 1997.

== Brigade units ==
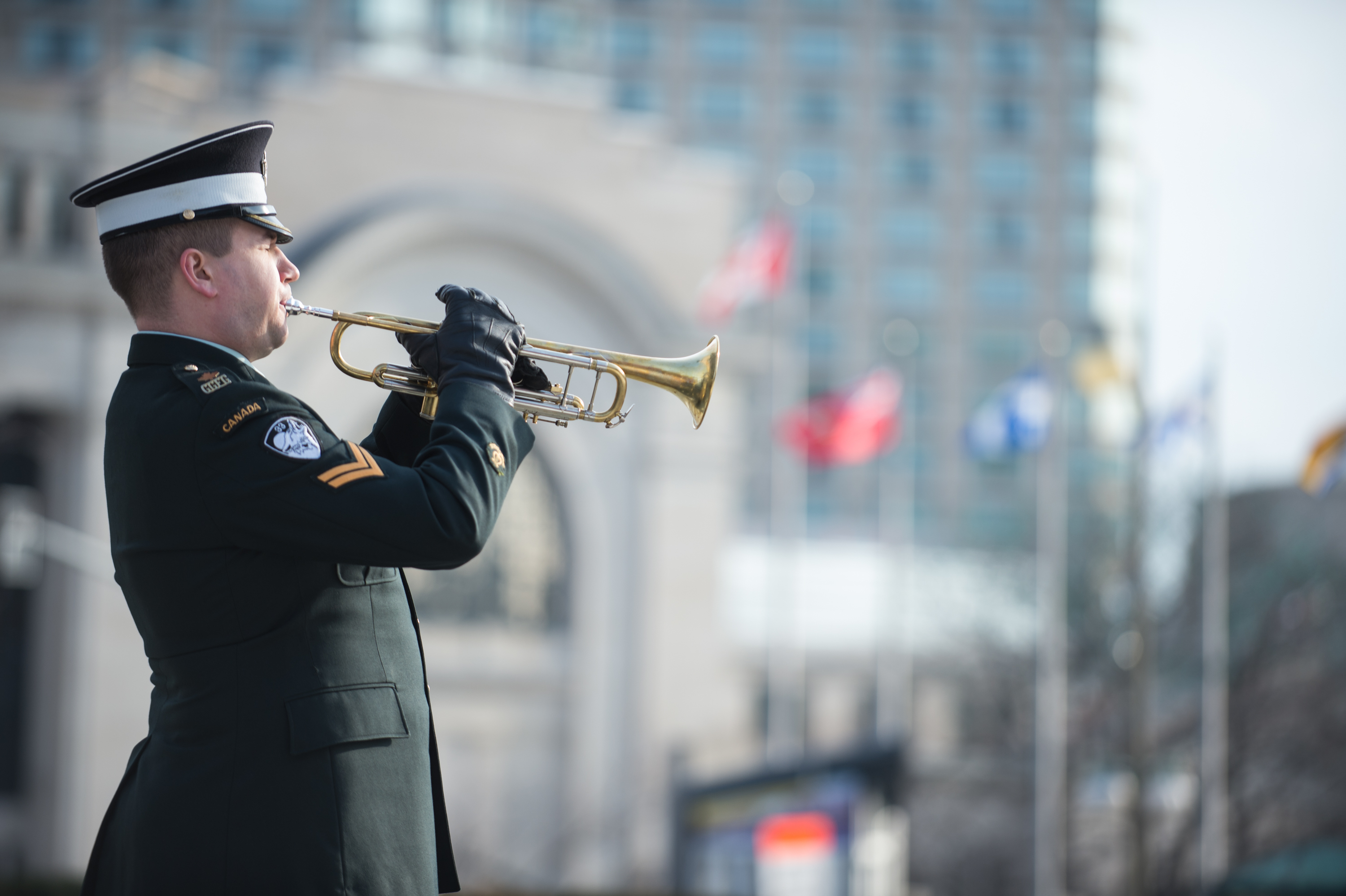
A bugler from the brigade group at the National War Memorial.

33 Canadian Brigade Group		Ottawa
33 Canadian Brigade Group Headquarters	Headquarters	Ottawa
The Ontario Regiment (RCAC)	Armoured Reconnaissance	Oshawa
30th Field Artillery Regiment, RCA	Artillery	Ottawa
42nd Field Artillery Regiment (Lanark and Renfrew Scottish), RCA	Artillery	Pembroke
49th Field Artillery Regiment, RCA	Artillery	Sault Ste. Marie
33 Combat Engineer Regiment	Engineer	Ottawa
33 Signal Regiment	Communications	Ottawa
Governor General's Foot Guards	Light infantry	Ottawa
The Princess of Wales' Own Regiment	Light infantry	Kingston
The Hastings and Prince Edward Regiment	Light infantry	Belleville, Peterborough and Cobourg
The Brockville Rifles	Light infantry	Brockville
Stormont, Dundas and Glengarry Highlanders	Light infantry	Cornwall
The Cameron Highlanders of Ottawa (Duke of Edinburgh's Own)	Light infantry	Ottawa
The Algonquin Regiment (Northern Pioneers)	Light infantry	North Bay and Timmins
2nd Battalion, Irish Regiment of Canada	Light infantry	Sudbury
33 Service Battalion	Combat Service Support	Ottawa, North Bay and Sault Ste. Marie

Cities with 33 CBG units
