= 37 Combat Engineer Regiment =

37 Combat Engineer Regiment (37 CER)
- Flag of the Canadian Military Engineers
- Active: 31 March 2012 - Present
- Country: Canada
- Branch: Primary Reserve
- Type: Combat Engineers
- Role: Military engineering tasks
- Size: Two Squadrons
- Headquarters: St John's, Newfoundland and Labrador

37 Combat Engineer Regiment is a reserve engineer regiment of the Canadian Military Engineers, part of the Canadian Army and 37 Canadian Brigade Group. It has its headquarters in St John's, Newfoundland and Labrador with a detachment (1 Engineer Squadron) in Fredericton, New Brunswick. It parades throughout the year from September to June while training continues throughout the summer in the form of courses and taskings. It is tasked to augment the regular force when required on both domestic and overseas operations. Currently the regiment's Commanding Officer is Lieutenant-Colonel Tim Park and the Regimental-Sergeant-Major is Chief Warrant Officer Doug Rotchford.

== Location ==
The regimental headquarters houses 56 Engineer Squadron and is located at the Surgeon Lieutenant Commander W. Anthony Paddon Building 115 the Boulevard, St. John's, NL. 1 Engineer Squadron parades out of the Carleton Street armoury in Fredericton, New Brunswick.

== 1 Engineer Squadron history ==
1 Engineer Squadron can trace its history to the year 1880 in western New Brunswick, Canada. There the Brighton Company of Engineers was formed from 67th Battalion, Carleton Light Infantry. At the onset of the First World War, the Brighton Company of Engineers was reorganized as part of the Canadian Expeditionary Force and the 1st Field Company, Canadian Engineers. During the Second World War, the units was headquartered out of Saint John, New Brunswick where they operated as a reserve unit and constructed coastal defenses in the Maritimes. On March 31, 1965, The 1st (Brighton) Field Squadron was made dormant and transferred to the supplementary order of battle, until 2009.

1 Engineer Squadron was re-established in 2009 at the Carleton and York armouries in Fredericton, New Brunswick. It shares close ties to both the Canadian Forces School of Military Engineering located close by at CFB Gagetown and the 1st Battalion, The Royal New Brunswick Regiment (1 RNBR), with which it currently shares armouries.

As a new unit there has been a focus on community projects and recruiting in order to build the size of the Squadron, one of these projects was the construction of a non-standard wooden bridge as part of a trail system in New Maryland, New Brunswick. As well the unit built above ground gardening boxes for the community food bank in Oromocto, as a part of their program to provide produce grown on site by the organization.

The squadron is a highly motivated unit that benefits greatly from the close proximity of a regular Canadian Forces base and the personnel/facilities of the Engineers working on the base. This close proximity provides the squadron with unique and invaluable training opportunities.

== Order of precedence ==
Preceded by 36 Combat Engineer Regiment	37 Combat Engineer Regiment	Succeeded by 38 Combat Engineer Regiment
