= Les Fusiliers du St-Laurent =

Les Fusiliers du S^{t}-Laurent
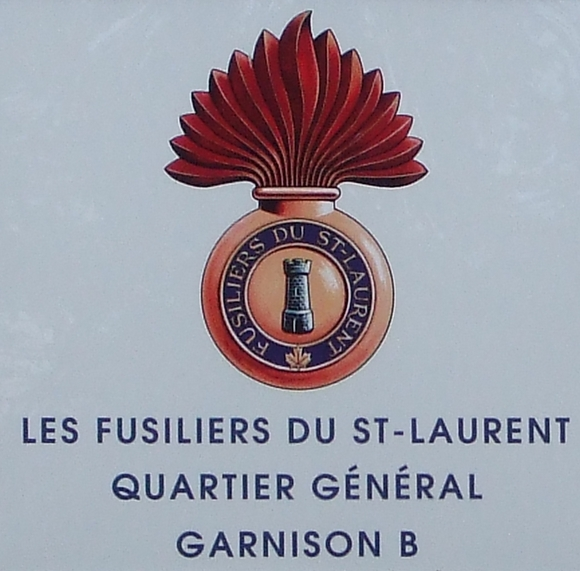
- Insignia of les Fusiliers du S^{t}-Laurent
- Active: 1869–present
- Country: Canada
- Branch: Canadian Army
- Type: Line infantry
- Part of: 35 Canadian Brigade Group
- Garrison/HQ: RHQ – Rimouski, Quebec
- Motto(s): J'y suis en garde (French for 'I am on guard')
- March: "Rêves canadiens"
- Engagements: Boer War; First World War; Second World War; War in Afghanistan
- Battle honours: See #Battle honours
- Website: www.canada.ca/en/army/corporate/2-canadian-division/les-fusiliers-du-st-laurent.html

Les Fusiliers du S^{t}-Laurent (French pronunciation: [le fyzilje dy sɛ̃ lɔʁɑ̃]) is a Primary Reserve infantry regiment of the Canadian Army. It was first raised in 1869 but also perpetuates the 4th Battalion, Select Embodied Militia, from the War of 1812. From 1954 to 1968, as a reserve regiment, it also was given a subsidiary title as the 5th Battalion of the Royal 22^{e} Régiment. This association was ended in 1968. The regiment celebrated 150 years of continuous service in 2019.

The regiment is based in Rimouski, Quebec.

== Lineage ==
=== Les Fusiliers du S^{t}-Laurent ===
- Originated on 9 April 1869, in Rivière du Loup, Quebec, as The Provisional Battalion of Temiscouata
- Amalgamated on 12 January 1883, with The Provisional Battalion of Rimouski and Redesignated as the 89th Témiscouata and Rimouski Battalion of Infantry
- Redesignated on 8 May 1900, as the 89th Temiscouata and Rimouski Regiment
- Redesignated on 29 March 1920, as Le Régiment Témiscouata and Rimouski
- Redesignated on 1 October 1920, as Les Fusiliers du St. Laurent
- Redesignated on 1 May 1922, as the Fusiliers du St. Laurent
- Redesignated on 3 January 1942, as the 2nd (Reserve) Battalion, Fusiliers du St. Laurent
- Redesignated on 1 June 1945, as the Fusiliers du St. Laurent
- Amalgamated on 1 September 1954, with Le Régiment de Montmagny and Redesignated as Les Fusiliers du S^{t}-Laurent (5th Battalion, Royal 22^{e} Régiment)
- Redesignated on 9 November 1963, as Les Fusiliers du S^{t}-Laurent (5^{e} Bataillon, Royal 22^{e} Régiment)
- Redesignated on 1 April 1968, as Les Fusiliers du S^{t}-Laurent

=== The Provisional Battalion of Rimouski ===
- Originated on 9 April 1869, in Rimouski, Quebec, as The Provisional Battalion of Rimouski
- Amalgamated on 12 January 1883, with The Provisional Battalion of Temiscouata and redesignated as the 89th Témiscouata and Rimouski Battalion of Infantry

=== Le Régiment de Montmagny ===
- Originated on 9 April 1869, in Montmagny, Quebec, as The Battalion of Montmagny and l'Islet
- Redesignated on 5 November 1869, as the 61st Montmagny and l'Islet Battalion
- Redesignated on 8 May 1900, as the 61st Montmagny and l'Islet Regiment
- Redesignated on 1 August 1902, as the 61st Régiment de Montmagny
- Redesignated on 29 March 1920, as Le Régiment de Montmagny
- Redesignated on 15 March 1942, as the 2nd (Reserve) Battalion, Le Régiment de Montmagny
- Redesignated on 1 June 1945, as Le Régiment de Montmagny
- Amalgamated on 1 September 1954, with Les Fusiliers du S^{t}-Laurent and redesignated as Les Fusiliers du S^{t}-Laurent (5th Battalion, Royal 22^{e} Régiment)

=== Lineage chart ===
Lineage chart

1812	4th Bn, Select Embodied Militia	2nd Militia LI Bn	Canadian Chasseurs
1815	Disbanded	Disbanded	Disbanded
1862	Independent infy coys
1863	Independent infy coys
1868	Independent infy coys
1869	The Provisional Bn of "Temiscouata"	The Provisional Bn of Rimouski	The Bn of "Montmagny and l'Islet"
1869	61st Montmagny and l'Islet Bn
1883	89th "Témiscouata and Rimouski" Bn of Infy
1900	89th Temiscouata and Rimouski Regt	61st Montmagny and l'Islet Regt
1902	61st Rég^{t} de Montmagny
1916	189th "Overseas" Bn, CEF
1916	Absorbed by 69th "Overseas" Bn
1920	1st Bn (189th Bn, CEF), Le Rég^{t} Témiscouata and Rimouski	2nd Bn, (Note: Reserve) Le Rég^{t} Témiscouata and Rimouski	1st Bn, Le Rég^{t} de Montmagny	2nd Bn, Le Rég^{t} de Montmagny
1922	1st Bn (189th Bn, CEF), Fusiliers du S^{t.} Laurent	2nd Bn, Fusiliers du S^{t.} Laurent
1936	Fusiliers du S^{t.} Laurent	Disbanded	Le Rég^{t} de Montmagny	Disbanded
1942	1st Bn, Les Fusiliers du S^{t}-Laurent, CASF	2nd (Reserve) Bn, Fusiliers du S^{t.} Laurent	3rd (Reserve) Bn, Fusiliers du S^{t.} Laurent	1st Bn, Le Rég^{t} de Montmagny, CASF	2nd (Reserve) Bn, Le Rég^{t} de Montmagny
1944	Le Rég^{t} de Gaspé-Bonaventure	Disbanded
1945	Disbanded	Fusiliers du S^{t.} Laurent	Le Rég^{t} de Montmagny
1946	Disbanded
1954	Les Fusiliers du S^{t}-Laurent (5th Bn, Royal 22^{e} Rég^{t})
1963	Les Fusiliers du S^{t}-Laurent (5^{e} B^{on}, Royal 22^{e} Rég^{t})
1968	Les Fusiliers du S^{t}-Laurent
2012	Perpetuates War of 1812 units

== Perpetuations ==
=== War of 1812 ===
- 4th Battalion, Select Embodied Militia
- 2nd Militia Light Infantry Battalion
- Canadian Chasseurs

=== First World War ===
- 189th (Canadien-Français) Battalion, CEF

== Operational history ==
=== First World War ===
On 6 August 1914, details of the 89th Temiscouata and Rimouski Regiment were placed on active service for local protection duties.

On 15 July 1916, the 189th (Canadien-Français) Battalion, CEF was authorized for service and on 27 September 1916, the battalion embarked for Great Britain. After its arrival in the UK, on 6 October 1916, the battalion's personnel were absorbed by the 69th Battalion (Canadien-Français), CEF to provide reinforcements for the Canadian Corps in the field. On 8 December 1917, the 189th Battalion, CEF was disbanded.

== Organization ==
=== Le Régiment Témiscouata and Rimouski (01 November, 1920) ===
- 1st Battalion (perpetuating the 189th Battalion, CEF)
- 2nd (Reserve) Battalion

=== Fusiliers du St. Laurent (01 May, 1922) ===
- Regimental Headquarters (Rimouski, Quebec)
- A Company (Rivière-du-Loup, Quebec)
- B Company (Rimouski, Quebec)
- C Company (Mont-Joli, Quebec)
- D Company (Rimouski, Quebec)

=== Fusiliers du St. Laurent (2023) ===
- Regimental Headquarters (Rimouski)
- A Company (Rivière-du-Loup)
- B Company (Rimouski)
- C Company (Matane, Quebec)

== Alliances ==
- United Kingdom - The Royal Northumberland Fusiliers (Until 1968)
- United Kingdom - The Royal Regiment of Fusiliers

== Battle honours ==
The regiment, and the older units it perpetuates, have rendered front line service in three conflicts. All four battle honours are emblazoned on the regimental colours.

- War of 1812
  - Defence of Canada – 1812–1815 – Défense du Canada
  - Châteauguay
- First World War
  - Arras, 1917
- Afghanistan
  - Afghanistan

== Notable members ==
- Lieutenant Jean Brillant VC MC
- Major-General Sir Marie-Joseph-Eugène Fiset KCMG DSO ED

== Armoury ==
The Rimouski Armoury is at 65 Saint-Jean-Baptiste Street East, Rimouski, Quebec, built 1910-11 is on Canada's Register of Historic Places from 1991.

== Order of precedence ==
Preceded by The Stormont, Dundas and Glengarry Highlanders	Les Fusiliers du S^{t}-Laurent	Succeeded by Le Régiment de la Chaudière

== See also ==
- The Canadian Crown and the Canadian Forces
- Military history of Canada
- History of the Canadian Army
- Canadian Forces
- List of armouries in Canada
