= 35 Canadian Brigade Group =

Brigade of the Canadian Army

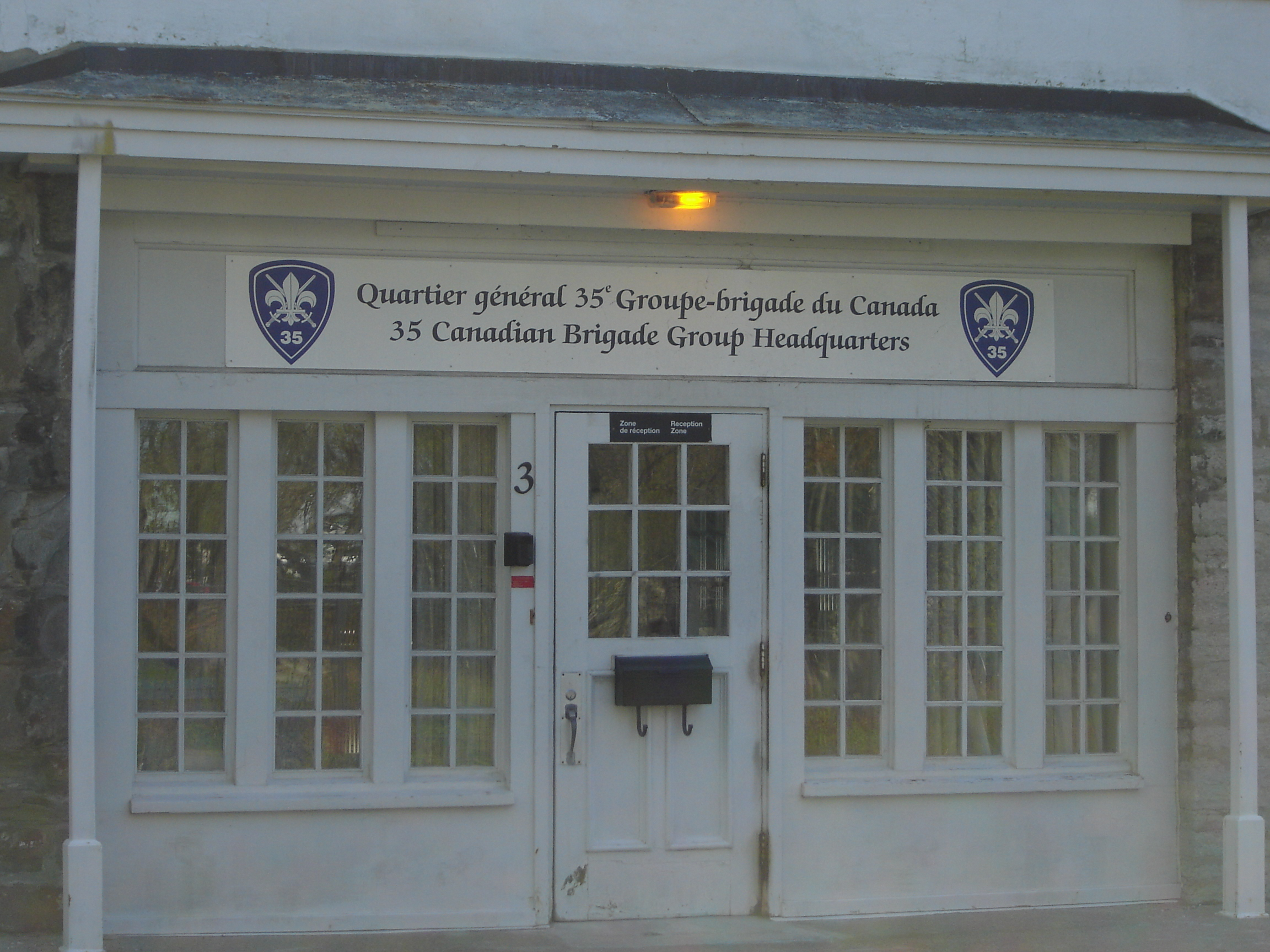
- Active: 1997–present
- Country: Canada
- Branch: Canadian Army Primary Reserve
- Type: Headquarters
- Part of: 2nd Canadian Division
- Garrison/HQ: Quebec City
- Mottos: Honneur et courage (French for 'honour and courage')
- March: "Le Pays"

Insignia
NATO Map Symbol
35 CBG
2 Cdn Div
- Abbreviation: 35 CBG

35 Canadian Brigade Group (35CBG; French: 35^{e} Groupe-brigade du Canada) is part of 2nd Canadian Division, under the Canadian Army of the Canadian Forces. It is headquartered in Quebec City, Quebec. It is the successor of the Cold War–era Quebec Militia District.

== Brigade units ==
Cities with 35 CBG units

Unit	Role	Location
35 Canadian Brigade Group Headquarters		Quebec City
Sherbrooke Hussars	Reconnaissance	Sherbrooke
12^{e} Régiment blindé du Canada (Milice)	Reconnaissance	Trois-Rivières
6th Field Artillery Regiment, RCA	Artillery	Quebec City, Lévis, Montmagny
62nd Field Artillery Regiment, RCA	Artillery	Shawinigan
35 Combat Engineer Regiment	Engineer	Quebec City
35 Signal Regiment	Signals	Quebec City, Sherbrooke
Les Voltigeurs de Québec	Light infantry	Quebec City
Les Fusiliers du S^{t}-Laurent	Light infantry	Matane, Rimouski, Rivière-du-Loup
Le Régiment de la Chaudière	Light infantry	Lévis, Beauceville
Le Régiment du Saguenay	Light infantry	Chicoutimi
Les Fusiliers de Sherbrooke	Light infantry	Sherbrooke
35 Service Battalion	Service and support	Quebec City

== See also ==
- 34 Canadian Brigade Group, the other such brigade formation in the province of Quebec.
