= 36 Combat Engineer Regiment =

- Country: Canada
- Branch: Canadian Army
- Type: Primary Reserves Combat Engineers
- Size: One Battalion
- Part of: 36 Canadian Brigade Group
- Garrison/HQ: CFB Shearwater
- Motto(s): Ubique (Latin, "Everywhere")

Commanders
- Current commander: Lieutenant Colonel T. Murphy, CD
- Honorary Colonel: Mr. I. Smith
- Regimental Sergeant Major: Chief Warrant Officer R.G. Anstey, CD
- Abbreviation: 36 CER

36 Combat Engineer Regiment (36CER) is a reserve unit of the Canadian Military Engineers in Halifax, Nova Scotia Canada. It is part of the 36 Canadian Brigade Group, 5th Canadian Division.

== Organization ==
There is currently One Engineer Squadron providing general engineer support to the brigade, and a Regimental Headquarters in 36 CER:

- RHQ is composed of the regimental command staff, Ops and training staff, and administration and logistics staff. Also within the RHQ is 20 Engineer Troop, located in Halifax, Nova Scotia the troop consists of a number field sections and a training section.
- 45 Engineer Squadron is located in Sydney, Nova Scotia.

== Order of precedence ==
Preceded by 35 Combat Engineer Regiment	36 Combat Engineer Regiment	Succeeded by 37 Combat Engineer Regiment of Canadian Military Engineers

== See also ==
- Military history of Canada
- History of the Canadian Army
- Canadian Forces
- List of armouries in Canada
