= 33 Combat Engineer Regiment =

- Active: 1 July 1902–present
- Country: Canada
- Branch: Canadian Military Engineers
- Type: Combat Engineers
- Role: To permit friendly forces to live, move and fight on the field of battle and to deny the same to the enemy.
- Size: 2 squadrons
- Part of: 33 Canadian Brigade Group; 4th Canadian Division
- Garrison/HQ: Maj E. J. G. Holland VC Armoury, Ottawa, Ontario
- Motto: Ubique (Latin for 'everywhere')
- March: Wings
- Website: Official website

Commanders
- Commanding officer: Lieutenant-colonel Jason Fox, CD
- Regimental sergeant major: Chief warrant officer S.B. Thompson, CD

33 Combat Engineer Regiment (33CER) is the Primary Reserve (Militia) unit of the Canadian Military Engineers in Ottawa, Ontario, Canada. It is assigned to 33 Canadian Brigade Group, part of 4th Canadian Division.

== Location ==
The regimental headquarters is located at Maj. E. J. G. Holland VC Armoury, 2100 Walkley Road, Ottawa Ontario. Along with 3rd and 5th Field Squadron.

== History ==
33 CER honours the history of 3rd Field Engineer Squadron and 5th Field Squadron, Royal Canadian Engineers (RCE). 3rd Field Engineer Squadron was established as the Ottawa Company of Engineers on 1 July 1902. In its early years the unit helped Ottawa deal with emergencies and stage public ceremonies. During the First World War, 181 of its members received 26 decorations serving with units of the Canadian Expeditionary Force. The company spent the war training Engineer officers.

On the outbreak of the Second World War, 3rd Field Company, RCE was mobilized as part of the First Canadian Division Engineers and embarked for Scotland. A Reserve company remained in Ottawa.

3rd Field Company RCE, made its operational debut in a 1941 demolition operation in Spitzbergen, Norway. It began its main war effort with the invasion of Sicily in July 1943. As the Canadians fought through Sicily, Italy, then France and Holland, the Engineers reconnoitered the ground over which the armies advanced, crossed rivers, built roads and bridges, located and disarmed mines and booby-traps, built communications networks and constructed field defences.

The 5th Field Squadron, RCE originated in Kingston, Ontario on 1 April 1910, when the formation of the '5th Field Company, CE' was authorized. It was re-designated: '5th Field Company, RCE' on 29 April 1936; '5th (Reserve) Field Company, RCE' on 24 February 1942; '5th Field Company, RCE' on 15 January 1946; and '5th Field Squadron, RCE' on 19 June 1947.

During World War II the 5th (Reserve) Field Company mobilized the '5th Field Company, RCE., CASF' for active service on 24 February 1942. The company landed at Normandy as part of First Canadian Army Troops in June 1944. It fought in the North West Europe theatre of operations. The overseas company was disbanded on 15 January 1946.

In peacetime, 33 CER trains to conduct demolitions, water supply, bridging, route maintenance, obstacle emplacement, mine awareness and geomatics/mapping support. It has also performed road and bridging operations for the Ontario Ministry of Transportation and Ontario Hydro and land management tasks such as the environmental clean-up of Upper Duck Island in the Rideau River.

33 CER provides 33 CBG with military engineering advice and operational support. Members of the unit have also served with the United Nations and NATO missions around the globe, most recently in Afghanistan, Somalia, Bosnia-Herzegovina, Kosovo, Pakistan, Cambodia, Cyprus and the Golan Heights.

=== Lineage ===
This Reserve Force squadron originated on 1 July 1902 and incorporates the following regiment and engineer squadrons.

The 3rd Field Engineer Squadron originated in Ottawa, Ontario on 1 July 1902, when the 'Ottawa Company of Engineers' was authorized to be formed.1 It was redesignated: 'No. 3 Field Company, CE' on 1 August 1904;2 '3rd Field Company, CE' on 1 June 1905;3 '3rd Field Company, RCE' on 29 April 1936;4 '3rd (Reserve) Field Company, RCE' on 7 November 1940;5 '3rd Field Company, RCE' on 15 October 1945;6 and '3rd Field Squadron, RCE' on 19 June 1947.7 On 1 September 1954 it was amalgamated with 'Headquarters, 10th Field Engineer Regiment, RCE' and '5th Field Squadron, RCE' (see below) retaining the same designation.8 It was redesignated: '3rd Field Engineer Squadron (M)' on 21 May 1975;9 and '3rd Field Engineer Squadron' on 9 July 1990.11

Note: The 3rd Field Company, CE was authorized a Reserve order of battle counterpart on 15 June 1920 (GO 89/20 and GO 128/30). The reserve unit was disbanded on 14 December 1936 (GO 3/37).

Headquarters, 10th Field Engineer Regiment, RCE originated in St. Catharines, Ontario on 5 June 1947, when 'Headquarters, 10th Field Engineer Regiment, RCE' was authorized to be formed.12 On 1 September 1954, it amalgamated with 3rd Field Squadron, RCE and 5th Field Squadron, RCE as above.

The 5th Field Squadron, RCE originated in Kingston, Ontario on 1 April 1910, when the '5th Field Company, CE' was authorized to be formed.13 It was redesignated: '5th Field Company, RCE' on 29 April 1936;14 '5th (Reserve) Field Company, RCE' on 24 February 1942;15 '5th Field Company, RCE' on 15 January 1946;16 and '5th Field Squadron, RCE' on 19 June 1947.17 On 1 September 1954 it amalgamated with Headquarters, 10th Field Engineer Regiment, RCE and 3rd Field Squadron, RCE as above.

Notes: The 5th Field Company, CE was authorized a Reserve order of battle counterpart on 15 June 1920 (GO 89/20 and GO 128/30). The reserve unit was disbanded on 14 December 1936 (GO 3/37).

The 5th Field Company, RCE was disbanded for the purpose of reorganization on 3 January 1921 and reorganized the same day (GO 62/21). This change was administrative and does not affect the lineage of the squadron.

Headquarters Location Ottawa, Ontario

=== Operational history ===
==== The First World War ====
The 5th Field Company was mobilized for active service on 6 August 1914 for local protective duties and engineer services in St. Jean and Valcartier, Quebec.

==== The Second World War ====
The 3rd (Reserve) Field Company mobilized the '3rd Field Company, RCE, CASF' for active service on 1 September 1939. It embarked for Britain in December 1939. The company participated on the landings at Spitzbergen in August 1941, and in Sicily in July and Italy in September 1943 as part of the 1st Canadian Infantry Division. The unit landed in France in March 1945 on its way to the North West Europe theatre of operations in which it served until the end of the war. The overseas company was disbanded on 15 October 1945.

The 5th (Reserve) Field Company mobilized the '5th Field Company, RCE., CASF' for active service on 24 February 1942. It embarked for Britain in July 1943. The company landed at Normandy as part of First Canadian Army Troops in June 1944 and continued service in the North West Europe theatre of operations until the end of the war. The overseas company was disbanded on 15 January 1946.

== Order of precedence ==
Preceded by 32 Combat Engineer Regiment	33 Combat Engineer Regiment	Succeeded by 34 Combat Engineer Regiment of Canadian Military Engineers

== See also ==
- Military history of Canada
- History of the Canadian Army
- Canadian Forces
- List of armouries in Canada
