= Black Watch Armoury =

Coordinates: 45°30′28″N 73°34′11″W

Armoury of the Black Watch of Canada
- Caserne du Black Watch du Canada
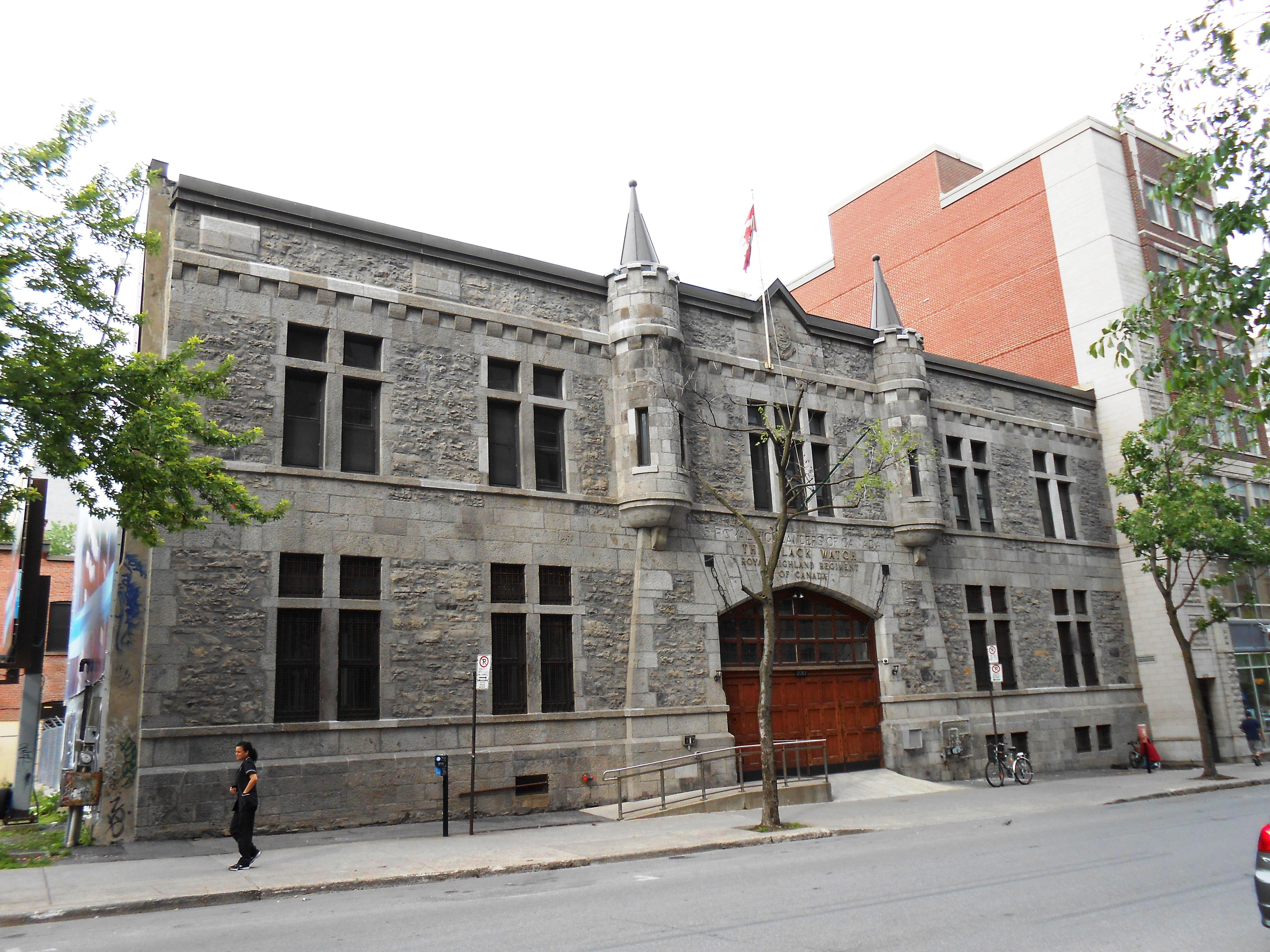
- Front entrance
- Interactive map of the Armoury of the Black Watch of Canada area

General information
- Architectural style: Scottish baronial
- Location: 2067, rue Bleury, Montreal, Canada
- Construction started: 1905
- Completed: 1906

Design and construction
- Architects: Samuel Arnold Finley; David Jerome Spence
- Architecture firm: Finley and Spence

Website
- www.blackwatchcanada.com/en/home-mainmenu-1

National Historic Site of Canada
- Official name: Black Watch (Royal Highland Regiment) of Canada Armoury National Historic Site of Canada
- Designated: 2008

The Black Watch Armoury (French: Caserne du Black Watch) is a Scottish baronial-style armoury in Montreal, completed in 1906 to house the 5th Regiment "Royal Highlanders of Canada" (now the Black Watch (Royal Highland Regiment) of Canada). Designed by Samuel Arnold Finley and David Jerome Spence, the armoury was declared a National Historic Site of Canada in 2008. It was previously designated a Recognized Federal Heritage Building, in 1994.

The armoury is home to the regiment's museum, which was opened on 8 November 1949 by the then-colonel of the Black Watch, Field Marshal Lord Wavell.

== History ==
On May 9, 1963, the armoury's exterior was damaged as part of a campaign of terrorist bombings in Montreal by the Front de libération du Québec (FLQ). In March 1983, two Molotov cocktails were thrown at the building, with a communiqué issued to local media claiming to be on behalf of a group carrying on the revolutionary politics of the FLQ. Quebec politics came into play again in 2009, when a protest by 200 demonstrators disrupted a Remembrance Day visit to the armoury by Charles, Prince of Wales, and Camilla, Duchess of Cornwall.

== Black Watch (Royal Highland Regiment) of Canada Museum ==
The Black Watch (Royal Highland Regiment) of Canada Museum Musée Le Black Watch (Royal Highland Regiment) du Canada
- Established: 1949
- Location: 2067, rue Bleury, Montreal Canada
- Type: Regimental Museum
- Website: Black Watch of Canada Museum

Opened in 1949, the regiment's museum includes uniforms, weapons, musical instruments, maps, medals, photographs and documents that focus on the history of the regiment, the city and the Canadian armed forces. The museum is open to members of the Regimental family as well as to the public on Tuesdays and by appointment. The museum and archives are at the regiment's headquarters on rue de Bleury in Montreal. The museum portrays the history of The Black Watch (Royal Highland Regiment) through a collection of regimental uniforms, accoutrements, trophies of war, and mementos.

It is currently undergoing renovations and is closed for the time being.
