= 2nd Field Artillery Regiment, RCA =

- Active: 1966–present as Fd Arty Regt
- Country: Canada
- Branch: Royal Canadian Artillery Primary Reserve
- Type: Field artillery
- Size: 2 batteries
- Part of: 2nd Canadian Division 34 Canadian Brigade Group
- Garrison/HQ: Côte-des-Neiges Armoury Montreal, Quebec
- Motto: Latin: Quo fas et gloria ducunt
- March: "The British Grenadiers"

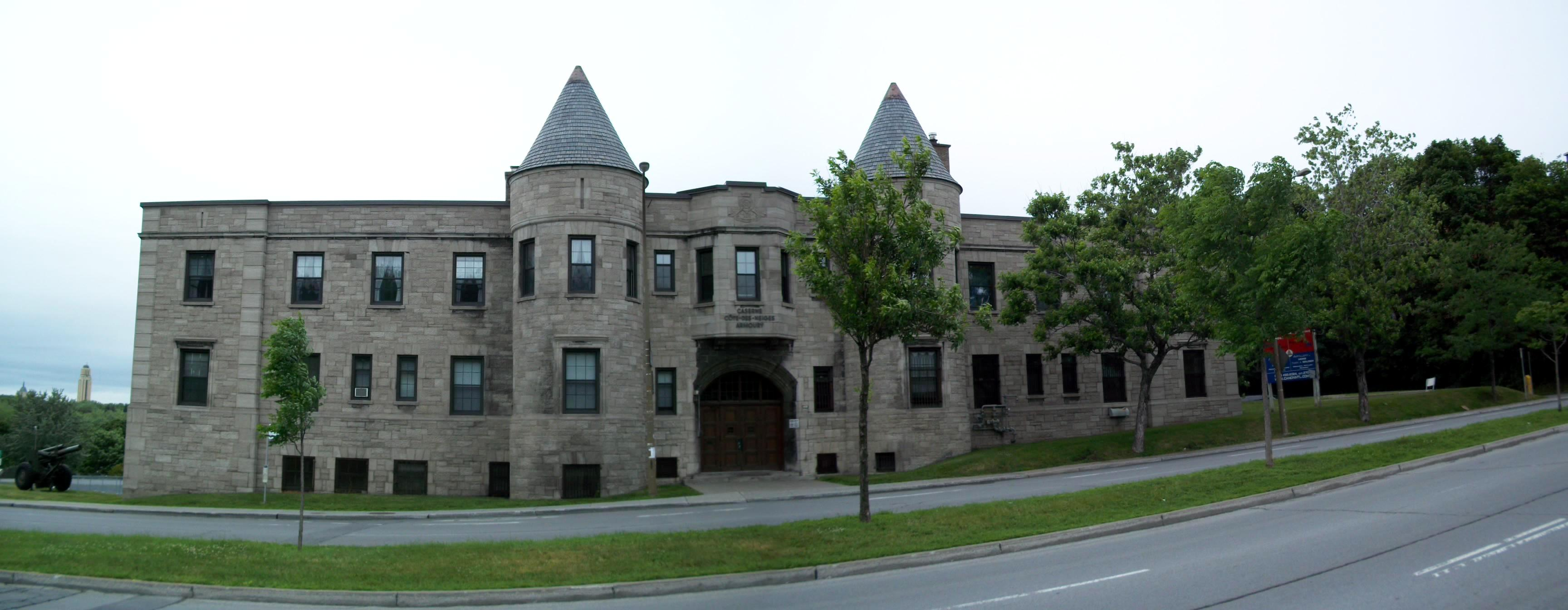
Côte-des-Neiges Armoury

The 2nd Field Artillery Regiment, RCA (French: 2^{e} Régiment d'artillerie de campagne, ARC) is a Royal Canadian Artillery reserve regiment. It is located in Montreal and shares its headquarters with The Royal Canadian Hussars (Montreal) at the Côte-des-Neiges Armory.

Although there had been temporary volunteer artillery units formed in Montreal as early as 1828, the regiment has its origin in the 3rd Montreal Battery formed in 1855 as a result of the departure of British regular troops for the Crimean War and the passage of the Militia Act of 1855. Militia forces, including the five field batteries formed, would for the first time be maintained at public expense. In 1856 the Battalion of Montreal Artillery was formed and in 1895 it was renamed the 2nd "Montreal" Regiment, CA.

== War in Europe ==
In the First World War several batteries of artillery were raised in Montreal and the 2nd Brigade included the 3rd Montreal Battery amongst its four batteries. During the war, the unit took part in every action of the 1st Canadian Division and later on the Canadian Corps. In a series of reorganizations the battery was renamed the 7th Field Battery, the name it continues to hold. This battery was commanded at the outbreak of the war by Major Andrew McNaughton. Wounded at the 2nd Battle of Ypres, he went on to command the Canadian Corps Heavy Artillery and, in the Second World War, the First Canadian Army. The 2nd Brigade served in the divisional artillery of the 1st Canadian Division for the duration of the war.

In the Second World War the 2nd Field Regiment was once again mobilized in the divisional artillery of the 1st Canadian Infantry Division and consisted of the 7th, the 8th, and 10th Field Batteries RCA. After training in England it served in Italy from July 1943 until January 1945 when it, along with I Canadian Corps, was transferred to Holland.

After the Second World War the regiments of artillery in the post-war Militia were renumbered and the 2nd Field Regiment was removed from the order of battle. Reorganization after the 1964 Suttie Commission and the ensuing Militia unit reductions eventually saw the 2nd Field Regiment reforming in 1966 with initially two and then three batteries. They were the 7th, 50th, and 66th Field Batteries, each perpetuating a different regiment of the post-war artillery in Montreal.

== Twenty-first century ==
On April 29, 2000, the regiment was awarded Freedom of the City of Montreal in recognition of its historical link to the city. Then in 2007 the city of Terrebonne also awarded the regiment the same courtesy.

Today, it is primarily made up of reservists from the city of Montreal as part of the Canadian Army Reserves. After over 50 years of peacetime operations, the regiment fields only a single artillery battery of six 105 mm C3 howitzers. It has sent its members abroad to serve in peacekeeping and anti-terrorist roles and has yearly gunnery exercises.

The regiment is commanded by a Canadian Reserve lieutenant-colonel, with a new commanding officer appointed, on average, every three years. The regiment is officially bilingual and functions in both English and French. The commanding officers of the re-formed 2nd Field Regiment are listed:

- 1966–1969 – LCol J.H.E. Day, CD
- 1969–1970 – LCol W.L.M. Cloutier, CD
- 1970–1973 – LCol J.R.G. Saint-Louis, CD
- 1973–1975 – LCol P.B. Fecteau, CD
- 1975–1979 – LCol T.K. Stafford, CD
- 1979–1985 – LCol S.J. Goldberg, CD
- 1985–1988 – LCol J.F. Stirling, CD
- 1988–1991 – LCol J.M. Pronkin, CD
- 1991–1995 – LCol J.M. Lewis, CD
- 1995–1998 – LCol D.A. Patterson, CD
- 1998–2001 – LCol J.G.M.B. Lefebvre, CD
- 2001–2005 – LCol J.M.N. Bernier, CD
- 2005–2008 – LCol M. Bourque, CD
- 2008–2013 – LCol D. Parent, CD
- 2013–2015 – LCol R. Garon, CD
- 2015–present – LCol S. Pelletier, CD

== Armoury ==
During November 1970 the regiment moved to its current location at the Côte des Neiges Armoury, after its Craig Street Armoury was demolished, the regiment had been based there for 75 years.

Site	Date(s)	Designated	Description	Image
Côte des Neiges Armoury; 4185 Chemin de la Côte des Neiges, Montreal, Quebec	1934-35	Canada's Register of Historic Places; Recognized - 1991 Register of the Government of Canada Heritage Buildings	on a treed site on the southwest perimeter of Mount Royal Park houses The Royal Canadian Hussars (Montreal); 2nd Field Regiment, Royal Canadian Artillery	

== See also ==
- Military history of Canada
- History of the Canadian Army
- Canadian Forces
- List of armouries in Canada

Preceded by 1st (Halifax-Dartmouth) Field Artillery Regiment, RCA	2nd Field Artillery Regiment (Canada)	Succeeded by 3rd Field Artillery Regiment, RCA of Royal Canadian Artillery Regiments
