= List of units of the Canadian Army =

The following is a list of units of the Canadian Army, as of 2022.

== Royal Canadian Armoured Corps ==
=== Regular Force ===
1. Royal Canadian Dragoons
2. Lord Strathcona's Horse (Royal Canadians)
3. 12^{e} Régiment blindé du Canada

=== Reserve Force (Primary Reserve) ===
1. The Governor General's Horse Guards
2. 8th Canadian Hussars (Princess Louise's)
3. The Halifax Rifles (RCAC)
4. The Ontario Regiment (RCAC)
5. The Queen's York Rangers (1st American Regiment) (RCAC)
6. Sherbrooke Hussars
7. 12^{e} Régiment blindé du Canada (Militia)
8. 1st Hussars
9. The Prince Edward Island Regiment (RCAC)
10. The Royal Canadian Hussars (Montreal)
11. The British Columbia Regiment (Duke of Connaught's Own)
12. The South Alberta Light Horse
13. The Saskatchewan Dragoons
14. The King's Own Calgary Regiment (RCAC)
15. The British Columbia Dragoons
16. The Fort Garry Horse
17. Le Régiment de Hull (RCAC)
18. The Windsor Regiment (RCAC)

== Royal Canadian Infantry Corps ==
=== Regular Force ===
Note: each regular force regiment retains a parachute company.

1. The Royal Canadian Regiment
  - 1st Battalion (mechanized infantry)
  - 2nd Battalion (mechanized infantry)
  - 3rd Battalion (light infantry)
2. Princess Patricia's Canadian Light Infantry
  - 1st Battalion (mechanized infantry)
  - 2nd Battalion (mechanized infantry)
  - 3rd Battalion (light infantry)
3. Royal 22^{e} Régiment
  - 1st Battalion (mechanized infantry)
  - 2nd Battalion (mechanized infantry)
  - 3rd Battalion (light infantry)

=== Reserve Force (Primary Reserve) ===
1. Governor General's Foot Guards
2. The Canadian Grenadier Guards
3. The Queen's Own Rifles of Canada
4. The Black Watch (Royal Highland Regiment) of Canada
5. Les Voltigeurs de Québec
6. The Royal Regiment of Canada
7. The Royal Hamilton Light Infantry (Wentworth Regiment)
8. The Princess of Wales' Own Regiment
9. The Hastings and Prince Edward Regiment
10. The Lincoln and Welland Regiment
11. The Royal Canadian Regiment
  - 4th Battalion
12. The Royal Highland Fusiliers of Canada
13. The Grey and Simcoe Foresters
14. The Lorne Scots (Peel, Dufferin and Halton Regiment)
15. The Brockville Rifles
16. Stormont, Dundas and Glengarry Highlanders
17. Les Fusiliers du S^{t}-Laurent
18. Le Régiment de la Chaudière
19. Royal 22^{e} Régiment
  - 4th Battalion, Royal 22^{e} Régiment (Châteauguay)
  - 6th Battalion
20. Les Fusiliers Mont-Royal
21. The Princess Louise Fusiliers
22. The Royal New Brunswick Regiment
23. The West Nova Scotia Regiment
24. The Nova Scotia Highlanders
25. The North Shore (New Brunswick) Regiment
26. Le Régiment de Maisonneuve
27. The Cameron Highlanders of Ottawa (Duke of Edinburgh's Own)
28. The Royal Winnipeg Rifles
29. The Essex and Kent Scottish
30. 48th Highlanders of Canada
31. Le Régiment du Saguenay
32. The Cape Breton Highlanders
33. The Algonquin Regiment (Northern Pioneers)
34. The Argyll and Sutherland Highlanders of Canada (Princess Louise's)
35. The Lake Superior Scottish Regiment
36. The North Saskatchewan Regiment
37. The Royal Regina Rifles
38. The Rocky Mountain Rangers
39. The Loyal Edmonton Regiment (4th Battalion, Princess Patricia's Canadian Light Infantry)
40. The Queen's Own Cameron Highlanders of Canada
41. The Royal Westminster Regiment
42. The Calgary Highlanders (10th Canadians)
43. Les Fusiliers de Sherbrooke
44. The Seaforth Highlanders of Canada
45. The Canadian Scottish Regiment (Princess Mary's)
46. The Royal Montreal Regiment
47. Irish Regiment of Canada
48. The Toronto Scottish Regiment (Queen Elizabeth the Queen Mother's Own)
49. The Royal Newfoundland Regiment
  - 1st Battalion
  - 2nd Battalion

== Royal Canadian Engineers ==
=== Regular Force ===
- 1 Combat Engineer Regiment
- 2 Combat Engineer Regiment
- 4 Engineer Support Regiment
- 5 Combat Engineer Regiment

=== Reserve Force (Primary Reserve) ===
Regiments

- 31 Combat Engineer Regiment
- 32 Combat Engineer Regiment
- 33 Combat Engineer Regiment
- 34 Combat Engineer Regiment
- 35 Combat Engineer Regiment
- 36 Combat Engineer Regiment
- 37 Combat Engineer Regiment
- 38 Combat Engineer Regiment
- 39 Combat Engineer Regiment
- 41 Combat Engineer Regiment

== Royal Canadian Artillery ==
=== Regular Force ===
- 1st Regiment, Royal Canadian Horse Artillery
- 2nd Regiment, Royal Canadian Horse Artillery
- 5^{e} Régiment d'artillerie légère du Canada
- 4th Artillery Regiment (General Support), RCA

=== Reserve Force (Primary Reserve) ===
Regiments

- 1st (Halifax-Dartmouth) Field Artillery Regiment, RCA
- 2nd Field Artillery Regiment, RCA
- 3rd Field Artillery Regiment, RCA
- 5th (British Columbia) Field Artillery Regiment, RCA
- 6th Field Artillery Regiment, RCA
- 7th Toronto Regiment, RCA
- 10th Field Regiment, RCA
- 11th Field Regiment, RCA
- 15th Field Regiment, RCA
- 20th Field Artillery Regiment, RCA
- 26th Field Artillery Regiment, RCA
- 30th Field Artillery Regiment, RCA
- 42nd Field Artillery Regiment (Lanark and Renfrew Scottish), RCA
- 49th Field Artillery Regiment, RCA
- 56th Field Artillery Regiment, RCA
- 62nd Field Artillery Regiment, RCA

Independent batteries

- 20th Independent Field Battery, RCA
- 84th Independent Field Battery, RCA
- 116th Independent Field Battery, RCA

== Corps of Royal Canadian Electrical and Mechanical Engineers ==
=== Regular Force ===
- 1 Service Battalion
- 2 Service Battalion
- 5 Service Battalion

=== Reserve Force ===
- 31 Service Battalion, London, Windsor, Hamilton, Ontario
- 32 Service Battalion, Toronto
- 33 Service Battalion, North Bay, Ottawa, Sault Ste. Marie
- 34 Service Battalion, Montreal, Saint-Hubert
- 35 Service Battalion, Quebec City
- 36 Service Battalion, Halifax, Sydney
- 37 Service Battalion, Saint John, St. John's
- 38 Service Battalion, Saskatoon, Regina, Winnipeg, Thunder Bay
- 39 Service Battalion, Victoria, Vancouver
- 41 Service Battalion, Calgary, Edmonton

== Royal Canadian Corps of Signals ==
=== Regular Force ===
- Canadian Forces School of Communications and Electronics, Kingston
- Canadian Forces Joint Signal Regiment
- 1 Signal Regiment, Edmonton
- 2 Canadian Mechanized Brigade Group Headquarters & Signal Squadron, Petawawa
- 5 Canadian Mechanized Brigade Group Headquarters & Signal Squadron

=== Reserve Force ===
- 31 Signal Regiment (31 Canadian Brigade Group)
- 32 Signal Regiment (32 Canadian Brigade Group)
- 33 Signal Regiment (33 Canadian Brigade Group)
- 34 Signal Regiment (34 Canadian Brigade Group)
- 35 Signal Regiment (35 Canadian Brigade Group)
- 36 Signal Regiment (36 Canadian Brigade Group)
- 37 Signal Regiment (37 Canadian Brigade Group)
- 38 Signal Regiment (38 Canadian Brigade Group)
- 39 Signal Regiment (39 Canadian Brigade Group)
- 41 Signal Regiment (41 Canadian Brigade Group)

== Intelligence Branch ==
=== Regular Force ===
- Canadian Army Intelligence Regiment (CA Int Regt), Kingston, Edmonton, Petawawa, Ottawa and Valcartier

=== Reserve Force (Primary Reserve) ===
- 2 Intelligence Company, Toronto
- 3 Intelligence Company, Halifax
- 4 Intelligence Company, Montreal
- 6 Intelligence Company, Edmonton
- 7 Intelligence Company, Ottawa

== See also ==
- Canadian Army
- Canadian Militia
- Canadian units of the War of 1812
- List of regiments of cavalry of the Canadian Militia (1900–1920)
