= Canadian Intelligence Corps =

Unit of the Canadian Armed Forces

- Corps du renseignement canadien
- Active: 29 October 1942–1968; 16 December 2016–present
- Country: Canada
- Branch: Canadian Armed Forces
- Type: Administrative corps of personnel branch
- Role: Military intelligence
- Part of: Intelligence Branch
- Garrison/HQ: CFB Kingston
- Nickname: Acorn
- Motto: Action from knowledge / Savoir pour agir
- March: "Silver and Green" by Capt J.M. Gayfer,

Commanders
- Colonel Commandant: LGen (Ret) S. Beare, CMM, MSC, MSM, CD
- Corps Director: Col A. Mannard, CD
- Corps CWO: CWO C. Dupont, CD

Insignia
- Headdress: Dark blue beret

The Canadian Intelligence Corps (C Int C) is an administrative corps of the Canadian Army (CA); it includes all CA members of the Canadian Armed Forces' Intelligence Branch. Prior to the Unification of the Canadian Armed Forces in 1968, it enjoyed the same status as an administrative corps of the then Canadian Army. The C Int C was never disbanded; however, it was effectively reduced to nil strength at Unification, and entered an administrative hibernation with its personnel and duties assigned to the new Security Branch. The Intelligence Branch was separated from the Security Branch in 1981. In December 2016 the C Int C title was restored by the Chief of the Defence Staff within the construct of the Intelligence Branch.

== History ==
Many Canadians were active in the Intelligence field as early as 1939. Major John P. Page GSO3 (Intelligence) at CMHQ in Ottawa was tasked "to evaluate Intelligence and consider how to promote the idea that the Canadian Army should form its own Canadian Intelligence Corps (C Int C)." His proposals were initially refused or set aside and it was not until 29 October 1942 that Canadian Army Intelligence was officially recognized as a corps.

The initial elements of the Intelligence Corps included the "Intelligence Sections at HQ First Canadian Army, I Canadian Corps; 1st, 2nd and 3rd Infantry Divisions, 5th Armoured Division; No. 1 and No. 2 Canadian Special Wireless Sections Type B; seven Field Security Sections (Army, Nos. 1,2,3,7,11,12); I9X at CMHQ" and the Intelligence "Pool." Additional field Units were in service in Canada, such as the "Security Intelligence Sections at the Districts."

With the formation of the First Canadian Army in Europe on 6 April 1942 and II Canadian Corps on 14 January 1943, additional Intelligence staff were required and in due course added to the Canadian military establishment. Intelligence staff duties at CMHQ also continued to expand, as it became the clearinghouse for all security-clearance cases initiated in Canada and investigated in Britain.

To facilitate cooperation "throughout the period of hostilities, personnel in the Canadian Intelligence Corps formed part of the Canadian Army Staff in Washington and worked in close co-operation with the Intelligence Staff of the United States War Department." They were linguists for the most part, proficient in German, Japanese and many other foreign languages.

Canada's Naval and Air Intelligence Staffs were equally busy fighting the war. Canadian Naval Intelligence officers studied German naval telecommunications, exchanging through 1943 for example, a daily U-boat situation report. (See John B. McDiarmid) Special intelligence from the UK was also provided to Ottawa and Washington. The level of cooperation between the three nations and their naval intelligence (NI) organizations was extremely close and both the American and Canadian officers paid visits to the senior British naval intelligence officer. All three nations promulgated the processed information to ships and commands within their zone of control. The UK recorded that formal integration of the three nation's NI staffs was never necessary, because the Anglo-American organization worked as one against the U-boat threat.

Throughout the war, foreign radio messages were being intercepted by Canadian Army, the Royal Canadian Navy (RCN), Air Force (RCAF), and Department of Transport Radio Division stations, in places such as Forest, Manitoba (and later Winnipeg), and Point Grey, British Columbia. Following the collapse of France in 1940, the RCN continued to monitor French naval frequencies at Britain's request in order to determine the fate of the French fleet. German communications intercepted by the Canadians also "helped the British in mounting" their "successful attack on" the German battleship Bismarck in May 1941.

In May 1943, as well as receiving the intelligence summaries issued by the Admiralty in Whitehall to the naval commands at home and overseas, the (radio interception) Tracking Room in Ottawa began to receive a full series of Enigma machine decrypts. The material allowed Ottawa to carry on a completely free exchange of communications by direct signal link with the Tracking Room in the Operational Intelligence Centre (OIC). The results were such that, "Canadian...intercept stations and Direction Finding (DF) organizations...made an indispensable contribution to the Allied North Atlantic SIGINT network."

The intelligence staffs of both the 1st and 2nd Canadian Infantry Divisions in England and other newly inducted C Int C personnel in theatre, continued to be sent to British intelligence schools for advanced training. On conclusion of their courses, they were attached to the intelligence staffs of some of the more experienced British formations, while British intelligence officers filled their places in the Canadian Army temporarily. As the Canadians became more proficient, they gradually replaced their British colleagues. By 1943, (most of) the intelligence appointments in the First Canadian Army were filled by Canadian personnel. There was a War Intelligence School where courses were given to officers who had been selected for intelligence duties in Canada.

C Int C personnel were included in the organizations of "1st Canadian Division and 1st Canadian Armoured Brigade (1 Cdn Armd Bde)." These "were the first Canadian formations to embark on a regular campaign during the war from the landings in Sicily in 1943" and through the fighting in both "Sicily and Italy." Shortly afterwards, "I Canadian Corps went to Italy and took part in the fighting there" along "with 5th Canadian Armoured Division." More C Int C casualties were added in the Mediterranean Theatre, when Corporal A.D. Yaritch was killed while on duty in the Adriatic. Intelligence operations continued in this theatre until all of the "Canadian Mediterranean Force moved to Belgium in 1945" and then went back "into action in Holland." In northwestern Europe, C Int C Sergeants G.A. Osipoff and F. Dummer were killed during operations in France.

In London, Canadian Intelligence Corps staff officers formed part of the group assisting the First Canadian Army Planning Staff. They studied the role the Canadians were to play and assisted in the collation of the voluminous amounts of intelligence detail, which poured into London from every conceivable source. This information was carefully sifted, examined, analyzed and, if corroborated by similar information provided by other recognized sources, was recorded and passed to the Operations Branch of the Planning Staff to consider what effect the data might have on the overall plan. The innumerable sources and agencies included refugees from Axis-occupied countries, members of the various resistance groups, Allied personnel dropped by air into enemy held countries who then transmitted their information by portable wireless sets, raids conducted on the French coast for a specific purpose, air photographs, neutral newspapers, mail censorship, air reconnaissance, interception of enemy wireless radio broadcasts and countless others. All of this effort was directed towards the one object of finding out as much as possible about the enemy, weather and terrain that would be encountered by the assaulting allied forces. Details concerning German troop strength, their defences, their armaments, administrative and supply systems, general strengths, dispositions, state of morale, fighting ability, personality studies concerning characteristics of enemy commanders, the German military state of preparedness, and reinforcement capabilities.

During all this planning activity at staff level, the training of Intelligence personnel with field formations and Units continued unabated. The Intelligence Corps staff devoted considerable time and effort during the pre-invasion period conducting a massive "background study" into the organization of the German Army, its weapons, tactics, equipment, civil administration and party organization, the language, the country and its people. Anything and everything that was considered useful and helpful towards completing the preparation of the invasion plans was actioned. The intensity with which this preparation was undertaken bore fruit, as evidenced by the tactical surprise which the actual assault achieved. During an interrogation after the battle, General-Field Marshal Gerd von Rundstedt, Commander-in-Chief of Germany's Army Group West during the Normandy invasion, revealed that although he had expected the invasion to occur daily from March 1944, he had not been prepared to oppose the landings where they actually took place.

Many C Int C personnel went into Europe with the "3rd Canadian Infantry Division (3 Cdn Inf Div) under I British Corps" when it "landed in Normandy on D-Day." Subsequently, additional intelligence staff with the "II Canadian Corps (II Cdn Corps)" participated in the operations at Caen while "under the command of the 2nd British Army." From 23 July 1944, senior C Int C staffs worked in the "Headquarters of the First Canadian Army, which was at that time in command of both British and Canadian Corps composed of a great variety of Allied forces."

Intelligence coordination and passage of information between the British and Canadian formations was successfully conducted at all levels of command. It was essentially uniform in substantial matters because intelligence at Eighth Army and within 21st Army Group was inspired by the direction of Brigadier Edgar Williams, CBE, DSO, Field Marshal Bernard Montgomery's chief intelligence officer in Africa, Sicily, Italy and North West Europe.

The intelligence organization within First Canadian Army was centralized in the GSO 1 Intelligence. He had no direct relationship to the director of military intelligence (DMI) in Canada. Any requests or observations, which he had with regard to intelligence matters, he passed to the DDMI and CMHQ who alone dealt with Canada. On several occasions during the war, HQ First Canadian Army was visited by the DMI and other officers from Canada but they exercised no control over the operational intelligence within the army which was entirely the concern of 21st Army Group and the intelligence staff officers at various levels.

=== 1942, formation of the Canadian Intelligence Corps ===
The Department of National Defence – Army – issued an order from Ottawa on 6 November 1942, granting authority, effective 29 October 1942, for the formation of the Canadian Intelligence Corps.

Canada-US intelligence sharing became a practical necessity at the tactical level. In the brigade-sized combined Canada-United States First Special Service Force (FSSF), which operated in Kiska and in Italy for example, the unit intelligence officer was Major R.D. Burhans, an American, throughout the unit's World War II service. Captain Robert D. Burhans had worked in the Army Intelligence Section in Washington before being promoted and becoming the FSSF G2 in July 1942. His intelligence assistant was Lieutenant Finn Roll, also an American.

=== 1944–1945, Canadian Army intelligence in northwestern Europe ===
Once the Canadian Army was "firmly established in France," its Intelligence Corps personnel made good use of "the principles they had learned in England, North Africa, Sicily and Italy." They achieved effective results "during the Canadian Army's drive through Belgium and South Holland in December 1944," and on into Germany in 1945.

As the Allied armies advanced eastward through France, groups of "stay-behind" enemy agents were rapidly ferreted out from their places of concealment and, if of French nationality, turned over to the French for examination and trial. Caches of explosives that had been prepared and stored or set in place to destroy key points, facilities, infrastructure, personnel, and equipment, were retrieved from underground storage vaults and rendered harmless. So effective were these efforts, that instances of sabotage were few and isolated. Other branches of Intelligence were similarly active.

"Captured enemy personnel and material were subjected to" a "thorough search, examination" and interrogation to provide a current database that would "keep pace with the ever changing enemy order of battle and improvements in weapons and equipment." German radio messages were intercepted and decoded. The intelligence gleaned by C Int C staffs enabled them to gain an accurate indication of changes in the identity of enemy formations facing them. These indications were supported by all available sources and agencies, including debriefing reports provided "from Canadian reconnaissance patrols, tactical air reconnaissance pilots, air photographs, as well as captured documents" and enemy equipment (CED & CEE). (No. 2 Canadian Special Wireless (SW) Section for example, operated from a Bedford truck under Major R.S. Grant as it fought its way towards and into Germany). All collected information was carefully processed and examined for useful information and then disseminated to the decision makers for further direction using the "intelligence cycle" process.

The one occasion when the Canadian Army found itself on the defensive came in December 1944. The Germans launched an offensive in the Ardennes, with the object of seizing the River Meuse and the capture of Liège to prevent the Allies from mounting an attack in the Aachen sector. Scattered along the length of the Lower Maas, from Nijmegen in the east to Walcheren Island in the west, elements of the Canadian Army were deployed to guard the Allies' northern flank. Threat of attack from this quarter became more apparent hourly as evidenced in reports reaching Canadian Intelligence. Enemy activity along the north bank of the Lower Maas involved mass movement of formations, the erection of rafting sites and barges, and vast numbers of recently positioned gun emplacements were clear indications to Intelligence that an attack from this direction, combined with the one already in progress in the Ardennes, was imminent. As a result, formations of the Canadian units were re-deployed to meet the attack, which was later revealed to have been directed at Antwerp but cancelled due to the failure of German forces in the Ardennes to reach their objectives.

"After the defeat of the German armies, personnel of the C Int C" remained in Germany to assist in "the liquidation of the German Intelligence Services, the disbandment of the Nazi party in all its manifestations and the de-Nazification of German institutions." Similar activity took place "in Holland where large German forces whose escape to Germany had been cut off by the Canadians were "screened." Those whose names appeared on specially prepared "lists" were arrested and held for trial."

Cooperation with American and British agencies took place in many forms and it included the fight against the threat of biological warfare. According to U.S. Army Col Murray Sanders, a highly qualified bacteriologist with the U.S. Chemical Warfare Service (CWS) at Camp Detrick in Maryland, "the cooperation [with Britain and Canada], the sharing of discovery and conjecture was total...we were more cautious with the French and we told the Soviets nothing."

By "the end of the war, the Intelligence Corps was several hundred strong and its personnel were scattered throughout the world." Many of its members had been seconded to British and American organizations and were employed in a wide variety of activities including clandestine operations in Europe and Asia. Intelligence Corps specialists also assisted in interrogation and document research during and after the surrender of Japan.

The contributions of the Intelligence Corps to the security of Canada, however, did not cease with the end of the Second World War. After the war and amalgamation in 1968, the corps became part of the new Canadian Forces Security Branch, and became involved in signals intelligence.

=== Afghanistan and Iraq ===
Although the corps was technically in administrative hibernation from 1968 until 2016, the function of delivering intelligence support to the Canadian Army in the field continued. This most famously occurred during the War in Afghanistan (2001–2021), where the Canadian Army deployed All Source Intelligence Centres (ASICs). The model of the ASIC has continued to be the premiere field intelligence unit of the modern era for Canadian Armed Forces Intelligence.

== Current units and organization ==
As an administrative corps of the Canadian Army all intelligence units of the Canadian Army are ipso facto units of the corps. Similarly, all personnel of the Intelligence Branch who are members of the Canadian Army are members of the corps. The headquarters of the corps is run largely by personnel performing the roles as secondary duties.

Current units:

- 1st Military Intelligence Battalion
  - 3 Intelligence Company
  - 7 Intelligence Company
  - 11 Intelligence Company
  - 12 Intelligence Company
  - 13 Intelligence Company
  - 14 Intelligence Company
  - 15 Intelligence Company
- 2nd Military Intelligence Battalion
  - 2 Intelligence Company
  - 4 Intelligence Company
  - 6 Intelligence Company
- Land Forces Intelligence Fusion Centre

== Meteorology ==
In 2012, the Canadian Armed Forces (CAF) brought the meteorological technician (met tech) occupation under the Intelligence Branch, simultaneously establishing met tech sub-occupations for the Royal Canadian Navy as well as the Canadian Army. Prior to this, the meteorology function in the CAF had been performed by meteorological technicians of the Royal Canadian Air Force since Unification. Before 1968 the Canadian Army had meteorological technicians, notably with 15 army meteorological units serving during World War II.

When then-Chief of Defence Staff General Jonathan Vance authorized the re-establishment of the Canadian Intelligence Corps in December 2016, the met techs of the Canadian Army automatically became members of the C Int C.

== Allies ==
The corps is allied with the British Army's Intelligence Corps, with the alliance approved by Queen Elizabeth II on 4 November 1954. The corps also enjoys close relationships with the other intelligence corps of the Commonwealth, especially New Zealand and Australia, and also those of the United States.

== Perpetuation ==
The Canadian Intelligence Corps perpetuates the customs and traditions of the Corps of Guides, the independent cyclist companies and the Canadian Corps Cyclist Battalion which comprised the Canadian Corps of Cyclists of World War I, as well as the many Canadian intelligence and meteorology units of World War II. Given its connection with the Canadian Corps Cyclist Battalion, the Headquarters of the C Int C commemorates the Battle of Amiens annually on 8 August. Due to the dispersed nature of the modern corps across Canada and around the world, with members serving in both the Regular Force and Primary Reserve, the units and sub-units of the corps also commemorate individual battles and actions that the Canadian Corps Cyclist Battalion fought in during the Hundred Days Offensive with acts of remembrance, as befit their local circumstances.

== Published histories and memoirs ==
- Scarlet to Green: A History of Intelligence in the Canadian Army, 1903–1963. Elliot, S. R. & Canadian Intelligence and Security Association. Toronto: Canadian Intelligence and Security Association. Altona, Manitoba: 2018.

== Notable members ==
- John Norman Stuart Buchan, Second Baron Tweedsmuir, CBE CD FRSE FRSA
- Farley Mowat, OC
- George Drummond Birks, CM
- Ben Weider, OC QC CD
- Jeffrey Delisle
