= Johnson Lindsay Rowlett Parsons =

Canadian Engineer and Military Officer

Johnson Lindsay Rowlett Parsons CMG, DSO
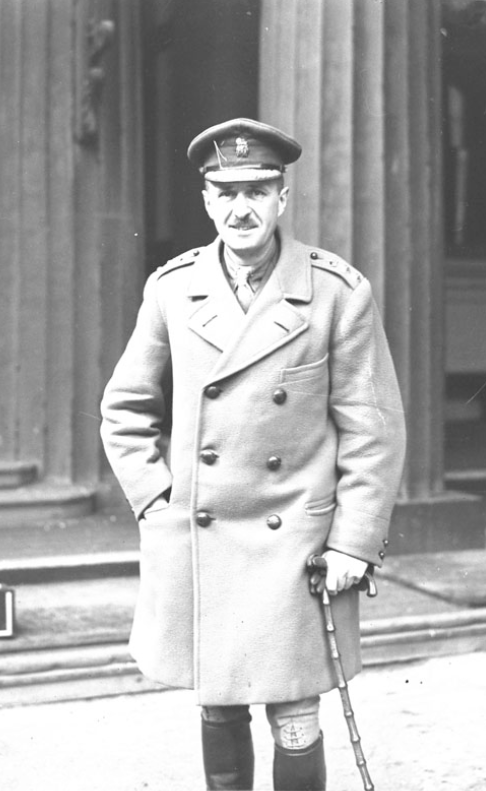
- Born: January 8, 1876; Orangeville, Ontario, Canada
- Died: October 3, 1935 (aged 59); Saint John, New Brunswick, Canada
- Military career
- Allegiance: Canada
- Branch: Corps of Guides (Canada)
- Service years: 1898-1919, 1931
- Rank: Brigadier

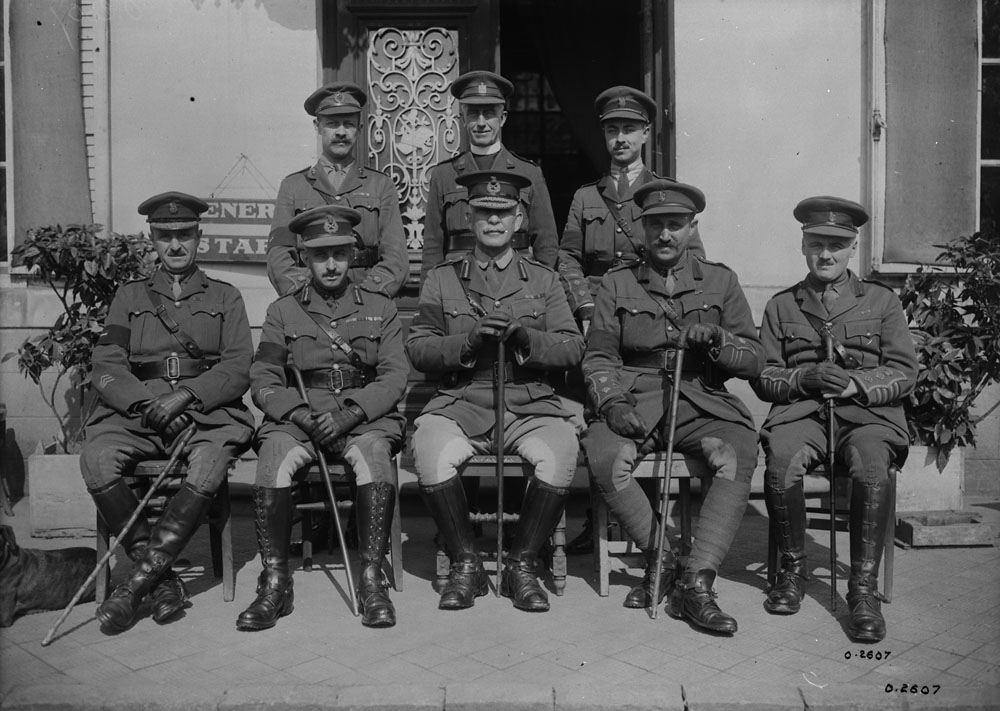
Major-General A.C. MacDonell and staff officers, 1st Canadian Infantry Division. (Front row, L-R): Lieutenant-Colonel J.L.R. Parsons, Brigadier-General H.C. Thacker, Major-General A.C. Macdonnell, Lieutenant-Colonel J. Sutherland Brown, Colonel H.P. Wright. (Rear row, L-R): Lieutenant-Colonel H.F.H. Hertzberg, Hon. Lieutenant-Colonel F.G. Scott, Lieutenant J.M. Macdonnell

Johnson Lindsay Rowlett Parsons CMG DSO (January 8, 1876 – October 3, 1935) was a Canadian geologist, surveyor and military officer specializing in intelligence. He was born in Ontario and joined the Canadian militia shortly after finishing school. Upon the outbreak of the First World War he joined the Canadian Expeditionary Force where he worked as an Intelligence Officer throughout the war. After the war he returned to his engineering firm in Regina, before eventually retiring to New Brunswick.

== Education and professional life ==
Parsons was born on 8 Jan 1876 in Orangeville Ontario. He attended Harbord Collegiate in Toronto and graduated with a Bachelor of Arts from Toronto University in 1897. He continued his education and graduated from the School of Practical Science in 1900. During the summer months he was engaged on geological surveys in Northern Ontario and after graduation he was employed by the Algoma Commercial Company at Sault Ste Marie, Ontario, until 1903 as a geologist. During this time he acquired his Dominion Land Surveyors Commission.

Parsons settled in Regina in 1904 and was with his brother Wellington Parsons in the firm Parsons Construction and Engineering Company Limited. Parsons was appointed the first President of the Saskatchewan Land Surveyors Association upon its inauguration in 1910. Also in 1910 he married Minnie Weldon from Shediac, New Brunswick. They had two children, a daughter Alma Kathleen and a son Rowlett Haliburton Parsons.

== Military career ==
Parsons first joined the Queens Own Regiment in November 1898 as an infantry private. Some time later he transferred to the Canadian Corps of Guides as an officer and is listed as being an officer in the No. 2 Detachment of the Corps of Guides in Toronto. At the outbreak of the First World War Parsons joined the 28th Battalion also known as the Saskatchewan Regiment.

Appointed as the senior Canadian Corps intelligence officer from October 1916 until June 1917, he took over from Lt.-Col. Mitchell, another former Corps of Guides officer. Parsons, along with Mitchell, were instrumental in establishing the Canadian Corps' intelligence organization and architecture. S.R. Elliot credited him with much of the intelligence behind the planning for the Canadian offensive of 1917 which included the Battle of Vimy Ridge.

In June 1917 he was seriously injured in France near Camblain L’Abbe. His injuries were described as: “a cerebral concussion and abrasion with a possible fracture of the skull.”

Throughout the war he also work as a member of the Canadian Corps HQ, and Headquarters of the 2nd, 1st and 5th Canadian Divisions. He finished the war in the Canadian Section GHQ 1st Echelon and finished the war as Colonel.

== Post-war life ==
After the war Parsons was again active in his engineering company and other interests until his retirement in 1925. When Mr. Parsons retired from his business in Regina he moved to the east coast of Canada. Then in 1931 he was appointed temporary Brigadier, as District Officer Commanding Military District Number 7. Due to ill health he retired, in 1935, to pension, medically unfit and granted honorary rank of Brigadier.

Johnson Lindsay Rowlett Parsons died on 10 March 1935 at Saint John, New Brunswick.

== Honours and awards ==
- Companion of the Order of St Michael & St George (1919)
- Distinguished Service Order (1917)
- Légion d'honneur, Croix du Chevaliers (France) (1919)
- Croix de Guerre (Belgium)
- Mention in dispatches (1916, 1918, 1918, 1919)
