= John McDiarmid =

John McDiarmid may refer to:

- John B. McDiarmid (1913–2002), Canadian academic and University of Washington professor of classics
- John Stewart McDiarmid (1882–1965), Manitoba politician
- John McDiarmid (tennis) (1911–1982), American tennis player
