= 2 Intelligence Company =

2 Intelligence Company Canadian Armed Forces
- 2 Intelligence Company Logo
- Active: 1903-1929; 1942-1946; 1947-1970; 1993-Present
- Country: Canada
- Branch: Intelligence
- Type: Army
- Role: Combat Intelligence
- Part of: 4th Canadian Division
- Garrison/HQ: Denison Armoury, Toronto
- Mottos: Latin: Ordo ab Chaos; Order from Chaos
- March: Silver and Green by Capt J.M. Gayfer
- Anniversaries: October 29, 1993

Commanders
- Current commander: Maj A.H.K. Wong, CD
- Honorary Colonel: LCol Jessica Clark Barrow
- Notable commanders: Maj S.L Bullock CD (1993-1996)

Insignia
- Abbreviation: 2 Int Coy

2 Intelligence Company (abbreviated 2 Int Coy) is a Canadian Armed Forces Primary Reserve Intelligence Branch unit based in Toronto, headquartered at Denison Armoury. It is part of the 4th Canadian Division. Its activities were confidential until the 1980s.

The Intelligence Officers and Operators of the unit reside in the Greater Toronto Area, work as professionals in the business community and are also active in numerous community service organizations. They deploy on domestic and foreign operations, and are primarily responsible for tactical, or combat intelligence. Recent deployments include to Cyprus, Bosnia, Afghanistan, Kuwait, and Canada.

== Lineage ==
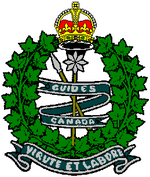
Corps of Guides

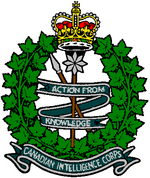
Canadian Intelligence Corps

Unit Name	From	To
2 Intelligence Company	October 29, 1993	Present
Intelligence Section, Military Police Platoon	February 1, 1970	October 28, 1993
No. 2 Intelligence (Training) Company	September 4, 1947	January 31, 1970
Disbanded	February 28, 1946	September 3, 1947
No. 2 Field Security Section	April 1, 1942	February 27, 1946
Disbanded	April 1, 1929	March 31, 1942
No. 2 Cyclist Company	December 15, 1921	March 31, 1929
No. 2 Guides Company	April 1, 1903	December 14, 1921

2 Intelligence Company perpetuates the presence of a military intelligence unit in Toronto that can be traced back to the original No. 2 Guides Company that was formed April 1, 1903. As mounted units, Guides Companies were tasked to survey their respective regions as well as to collect information of potential military intelligence value. Upon mobilization for World War I, Guides personnel were reassigned to other duties. This was due to the fact that there was no establishment for intelligence units in the British divisional structure on which the Canadian Expeditionary Force was based. Guides personnel however did serve in intelligence capacities at corps, division and brigade level throughout the war. Following the end of World War I, units of the Corps of Guides were restructured as Cyclists and a company assigned to each Military District. On December 15, 1921, the company in Toronto was re-designated No. 2 Cyclist Company. As Divisional troops, these units were tasked to conduct reconnaissance and force protection.

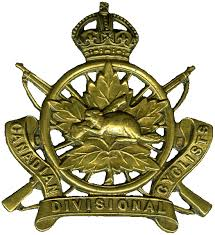
Badge of the Canadian Divisional Cyclists

On March 31, 1929, the Corps of Guides was disbanded. As a result, the Canadian Army had no officers or men trained in "field intelligence" at the beginning of World War II. The Canadian Intelligence Corps was formed on October 29, 1942. Overseas, the Corps grouped together several specialist units as well as all personnel employed in intelligence duties at various headquarters, but did not include senior staff officers or intelligence officers at Brigade and Battalion level. Within Canada, Canadian Intelligence Corps units were responsible for the training of specialist personnel, performing signals intelligence and censorship duties as well as conducting counter-intelligence. One of these units was No. 2 Field Security Section (also known as No. 2 Intelligence Section), which operated in Toronto from April 1, 1942, until February 27, 1946.

The need to train officers and men without wartime experience was recognized quickly after the end of World War II and militia intelligence companies were formed across Canada. No. 2 Intelligence Company (also known as 2 Intelligence Training Company) was formed in Toronto on September 4, 1947. Training was provided in combat intelligence, air imagery analysis, field security and languages.

With Unification, the amalgamation of the Regular Force Intelligence component with the Provost Corps led to the amalgamation of their militia counterparts. On February 1, 1970, No. 2 Intelligence Company was reduced to a section within the Military Police Platoon of the Toronto Service Battalion.

2 Intelligence Company returned to the Canadian Army's Order of Battle on October 29, 1993, as Land Force Central Intelligence Company. It regained its historic designation on May 19, 1995.

== World War I (1914–1918) ==
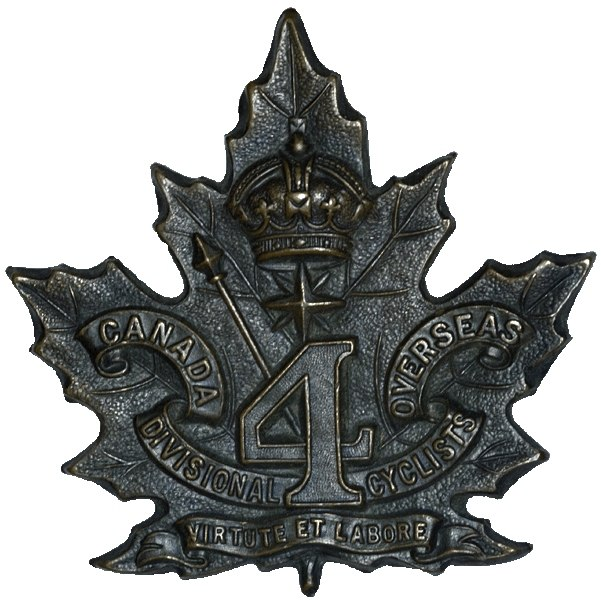
Cap badge of the 4th Divisional Cyclist Company

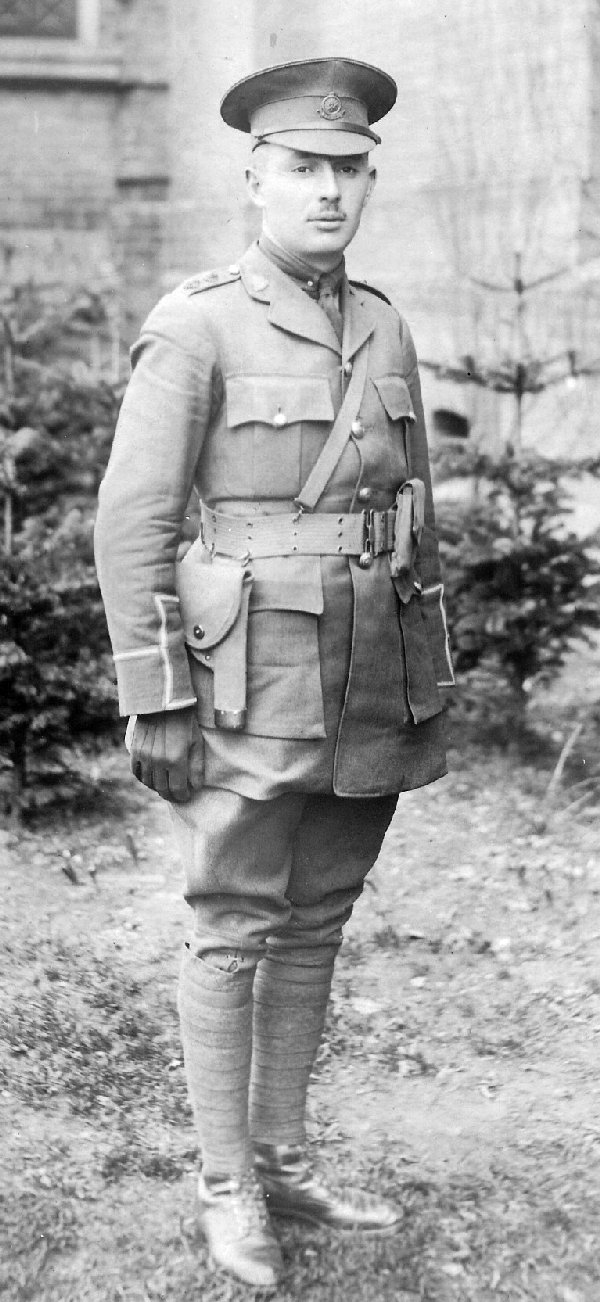
Lt. W. M. Fatt

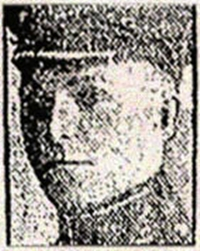
Private Albert Brimmell

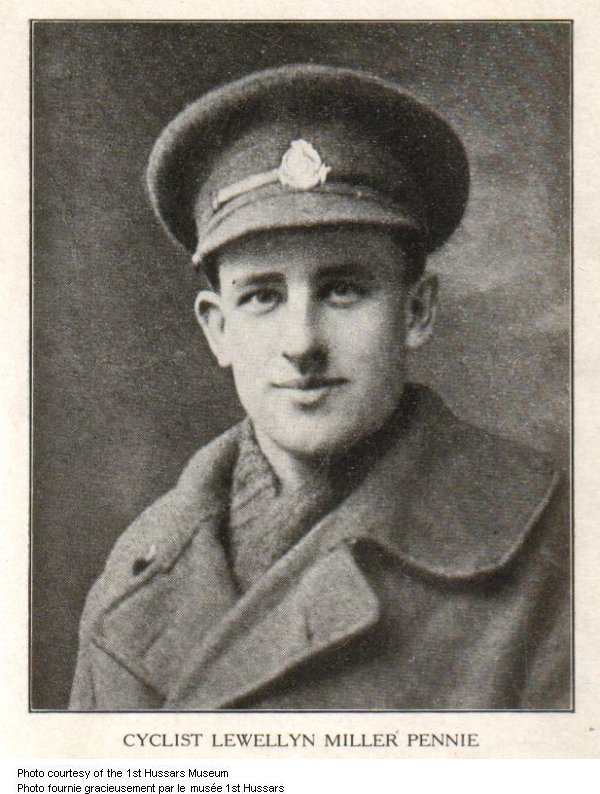
Pte Llewellyn M. Pennie

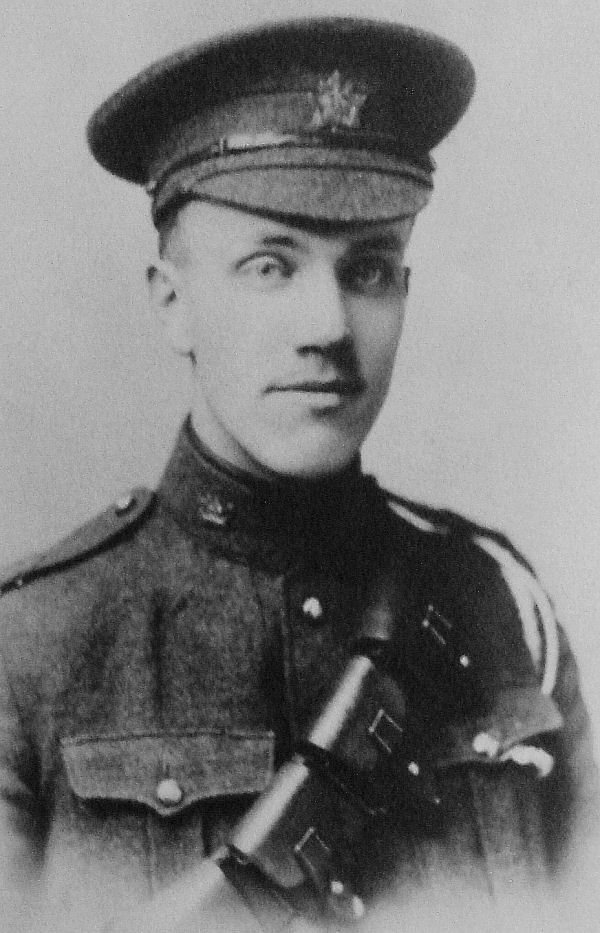
Pte Clifford E. Rogers

4th Divisional Cyclist Company of the Canadian Expeditionary Force was organized in Toronto in March 1916 under the command of Captain G. L. Berkley, with a strength of 8 officers and 191 other ranks. They deployed from Halifax aboard HMT Olympic 1 May 1916, arriving in England 6 May, and were attached to Canadian Reserve Cyclist Company near Swindon at Chisledon Camp. The unit was disbanded by General Order 208 of 15 November 1920.

In addition to the training the Cyclists had received under the direction of the Corps of Guides in Canada, a much more intensive course was started in England which consisted of musketry, bombing, and bayonet fighting coupled with the specialized training in signalling and topography techniques, range-finding, tactics and the use of Lewis guns.

== World War II (1939–1945) ==
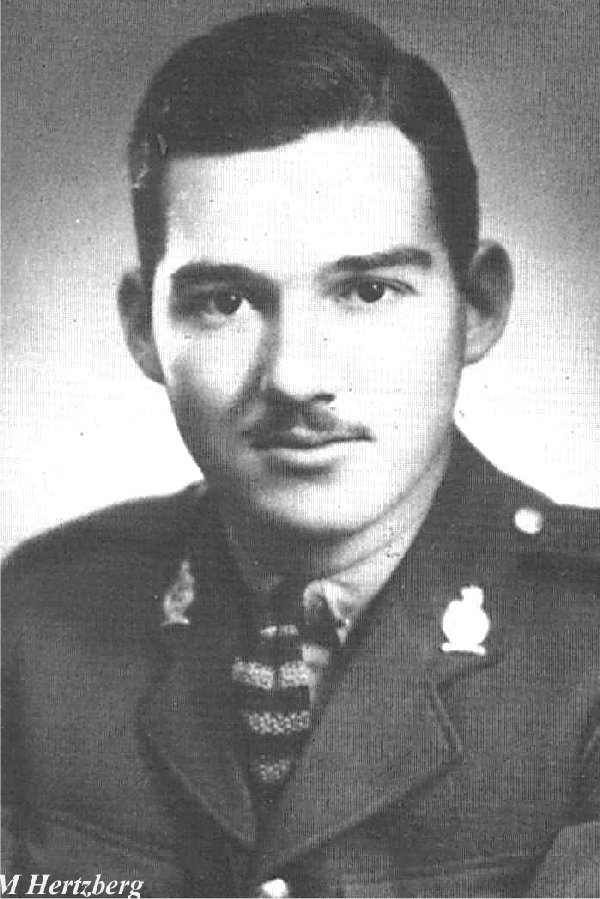
Captain Olaf Morris Hertzberg

The Canadian Virtual War Memorial lists six fallen soldiers as members either of "2 Intelligence Company", or "2 Field Security Sec.". The unit was known as 2 Field Security Section before 1947 when it was designated No. 2 Intelligence Company. Other fallen soldiers from Toronto, listed only as members of the Canadian Intelligence Corps, who were likely members of the unit include:

- Captain Olaf Morris Hertzberg, (December 18, 1919 – February 26, 1943). Enlisted: September 2, 1939 Toronto, Ontario. Mentioned in Dispatches, "in recognition of gallant and distinguished services in the combined attack on Dieppe."
- Sergeant William Allan McCarthy, (January 14, 1917 – September 6, 1944). Son of Mrs. M. E. McCarthy, of Toronto, Ontario.

=== Captain Frank Pickersgill ===
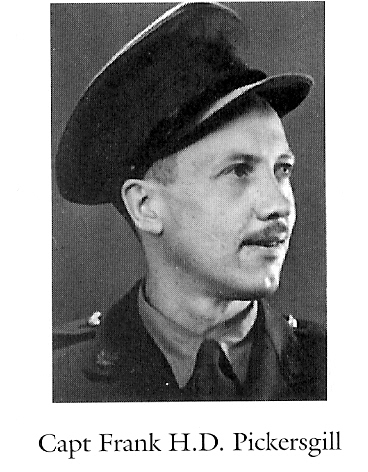
Capt Frank Pickersgill

May 28, 1915 – September 14, 1944. Born in Winnipeg, Manitoba. Son of Frank Allan Pickersgill and Sara Cornelia (née Smith) Pickersgill, of Vancouver, British Columbia. Brother of Jack Pickersgill, a member of the House of Commons of Canada and a Cabinet Minister until 1967.

Captain Frank Pickersgill (code name: Bertrand) spoke English, French, German, Spanish and Greek. After receiving his MA in classics at U of T in 1938, he went to study in London, England. While travelling in Europe he was interned as an enemy alien by the Germans and put to hard labour. After using a metal file smuggled to him in a loaf of bread to saw his way out of his cell and escape, he returned to Britain, briefing Canadian units on conditions in German-occupied France. He volunteered to be parachuted into France with the Special Operations Executive (SOE) to support the French Resistance. Along with John Kenneth Macalister, another U of T student and Rhodes scholar from Guelph, Ontario, he was inserted on the night of June 15, 1943. The two were almost immediately picked up in a random search by the German army.

The two men were tortured by the Gestapo, who wanted them to pretend to still be free, and so encourage more SOE personnel to parachute in and be captured. Neither cooperated with the enemy. The Gestapo entertained Pickersgill at their Paris headquarters in an effort to persuade him to assist them. Pickersgill didn't relent. Instead, he broke a wine bottle, used the jagged edge to slit a guard's throat and managed to escape by jumping out a second-storey window before SS guards shot him four times and recaptured him. He was sent to the Buchenwald extermination camp, where he and Macalister were strangled as spies in early September, 1944. Buchenwald survivors said Pickersgill continued to try to keep his fellow captives' spirits up to the very end, telling bad jokes and encouraging them to march in step like soldiers.

Captain Pickersgill, an alumnus of the University of Toronto, was honoured on September 15, 2004, at a wreath-laying at a small garden dedicated to him and his fellow Special Operations Executive agent, Captain John Kenneth Macalister at the foot of the University's Soldiers' Tower.

He was buried at Groesbeek Memorial, Netherlands. Grave Reference: Panel 11.

==== Citations ====
1939-45 Star, France and Germany Star, Defence Medal, War Medal 1939-45, Canadian Volunteer Service Medal and Clasp. Mention in Dispatches, 12 November 1945. He was posthumously awarded the Cross of the Chevalier de la Légion d'Honneur (France) in a ceremony on 12 December 1950 at the French embassy in Ottawa, Ontario.

=== Captain John Kenneth MacAlister ===
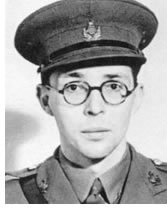
Captain John K. MacAlister

July 19, 1914 – September 14, 1944. John Kenneth Macalister (code name: Valentin, alias: Jean Charles Mauinier) was born July 19, 1914, in Guelph, Ontario. Son of Alexander and Celestine MacAlister; husband of Jeannine (née Lucas) MacAlister, of Paris, France. He spoke French and English. After graduating at the top of his law class at the University of Toronto, Macalister attended Oxford on a Rhodes Scholarship. He graduated from there with first-class honours, and went on to the bar exams in London where he came first among the 142 from across the empire who sat the tests. He turned down a position teaching law at the University of Toronto in order to serve as an intelligence officer, responding to the faculty with only, "Sorry. Many thanks. Macalister."

He was parachuted into France with the SOE to support the French Resistance on the night of June 15, 1943. They were met by agent Yvonne Rudelatt as planned, but were shortly afterward stopped by the Gestapo, who had been tipped off by an informer. Although they tried to get away, shots were fired and Rudelatt was hit, causing the car to crash. They were taken to Fresnes prison, where they were interrogated and tortured repeatedly. Macalister steadfastly refused to reveal his security checks to the Germans, who had his codes and wished to send misleading messages back to the SOE's London headquarters. Macalister gave his interrogators nothing and when his captors tried to send messages, SOE recognized them as fake. He was sent to the Buchenwald extermination camp, where he was executed as a spy September 14, 1944.

Captain MacAlister, an alumnus of the University of Toronto was honoured on September 15, 2004, at a wreath-laying at a small garden dedicated to him and his fellow SOE agent, Captain Frank Pickersgill at the foot of the University's Soldiers' Tower. In 1995, the former principal of University College, Douglas LePan published an epic poem on MacAlister titled Macalister or Dying in the Dark.

He was buried at Brookwood Memorial, Surrey, United Kingdom. Grave Reference: Panel 21 Column 1.

==== Citations ====
Mention in Dispatches, 15 November 1945 "for his great bravery and self-sacrifice".

=== Warrant Officer Class II (CSM) James Smart Milne ===
December 25, 1897 – August 19, 1942. Killed in action at Dieppe. He was buried at Dieppe Canadian War Cemetery (Hautot-Sur-Mer), Seine-Maritime, France. Grave Reference L. 51.

=== Sergeant William Corson ===
November 10, 1905 – August 19, 1942. Killed in action at Dieppe. He was buried at Dieppe Canadian War Cemetery (Hautot-Sur-Mer), Seine-Maritime, France. Grave Reference: B. 26.

=== Sergeant George Anthony Osipoff ===
September 25, 1919 – August 9, 1944. Son of Anton and Teena Osipoff. Husband of Ethel M. Osipoff, of Chichester, Sussex, England. Sergeant Ossipoff was working as a furrier when he enlisted at Regina on the outbreak of the war. He was killed in action on Operation Totalize during the push to Falaise, and was buried at Bretteville-Sur-Laize Canadian War Cemetery, Calvados, France. Grave Reference: XIII. E. 16.

=== Lance Corporal Joseph William Place ===
November 26, 1916 – June 5, 1943. Son of Tom and Mary Place; husband of Ruth Place, of Hamilton, Ontario. He was buried at Brookwood Military Cemetery, Surrey, United Kingdom. Grave Reference: 40. E. 4.

== Korean War (1950–1953) ==
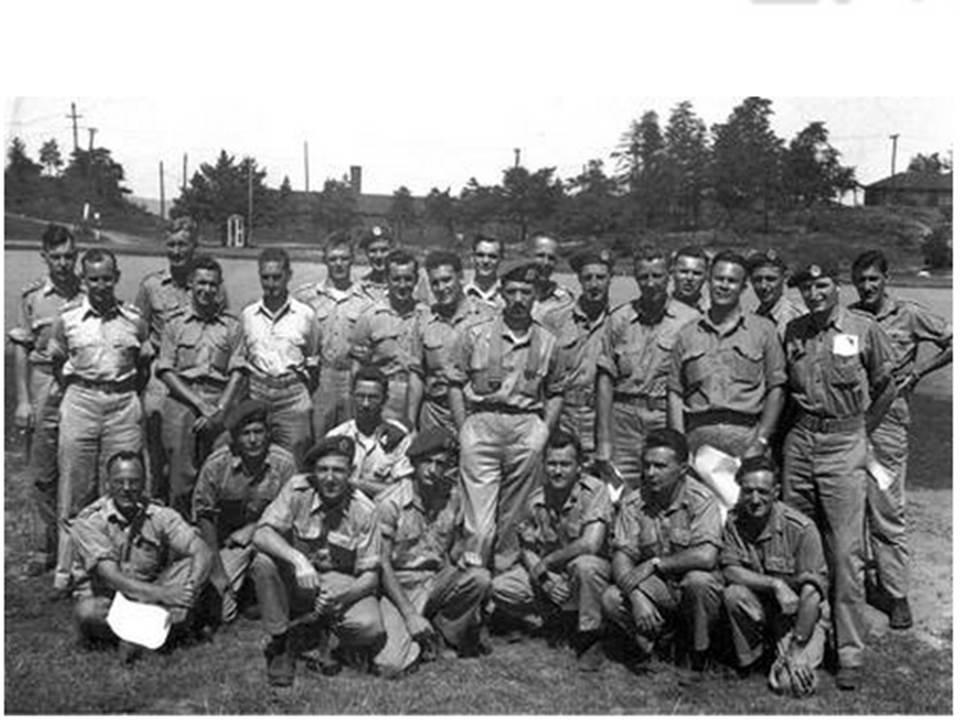
2 Int Coy, Toronto, 1948 – SSgt Struthers pictured far right

Staff Sergeant James Hillary Struthers was one of the few Canadian Intelligence Corps personnel to serve in the Korean War. He was a World War II veteran who had served in the Royal Canadian Dragoons from 1938 to 1946. Following the end of the war he returned to Toronto, where he joined the Canadian Intelligence Corps as a reservist in 2 Intelligence Company. In May, 1951, he deployed to Korea with 1 Field Security Section, which had a unit strength of two intelligence officers, 17 intelligence operators and 12 other non-intelligence members. Their tasks included counter intelligence and force protection through screening of civilian labourers, refugee control, and interrogations; activities now known as HUMINT. The unit was disbanded in December 1951 in an effort by Ottawa to reduce the Canadian contribution to the war.

== War in Afghanistan (2005–2011) ==
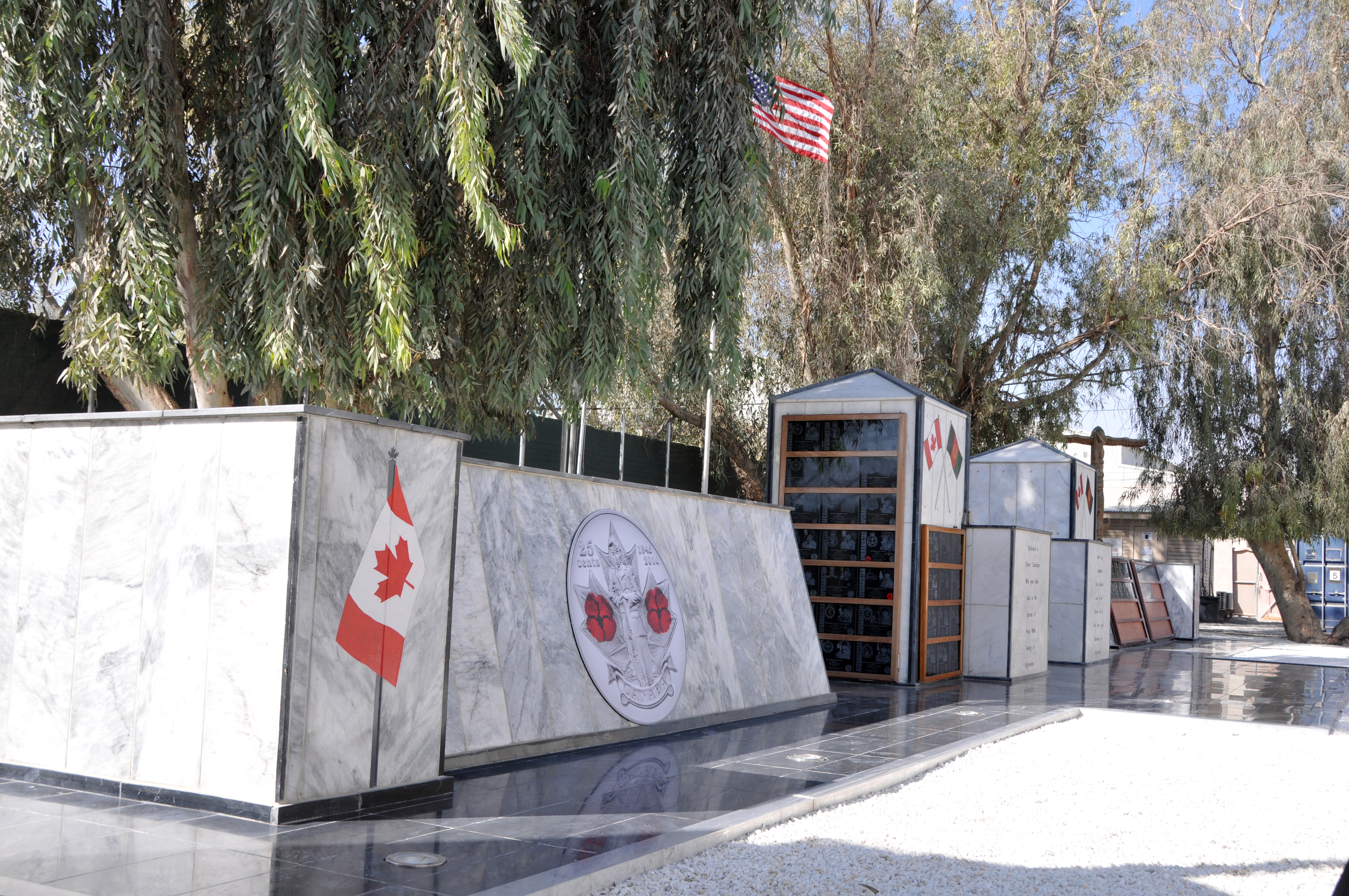
Canadian Afghan War Memorial, Kandahar, 2010

Soldiers from 2 Intelligence Company deployed on operations in Afghanistan from 2005 through the end of combat operations in 2011, and following that on the NATO Training Mission and withdrawal (2012–14). Throughout the combat operations period, up to 25 percent of the unit's effective strength was deployed.

2 Intelligence Company personnel served with various formations and units, including at ISAF Joint Command (IJC), Information Dominance Centre (IDC) Kabul, Regional Command South, Task Force Kandahar HQ, Battle Group, Canadian Operational Mentor and Liaison Teams (OMLTs), National Support Element and the All Source Intelligence Centre. Operations conducted include MEDUSA, ATHENA and ARCHER.

=== Citations ===
Unit member citations from the war include a Mention in Dispatches October 2, 2007, and a Meritorious Service Medal awarded June 20, 2012.

== Notable women ==
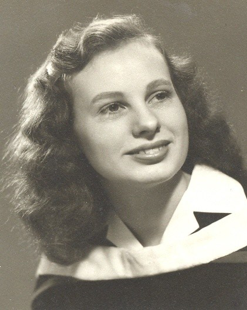
Colonel Doris Guyatt

Women have always played an important role in the Canadian Intelligence Corps.

=== Honorary Lieutenant-Colonel Dr. Doris Guyatt ===
Prior to her appointment as Honorary Lieutenant-Colonel of the 25 Field Ambulance in 1992, H LCol Doris Guyatt P.h.D., CD, served with 2 Intelligence Company for seventeen years from 1958 to 1975 and then from 1975 for 1992 as a Military Aide de Camp to five Lieutenant Governors of Ontario. Throughout this period, she was also a dedicated and active member of the Canadian Intelligence and Security Association and became its President in 1997. She also served as president of the Canadian Federation of Business and the Professional Women's Club, director of the Atlantic Council of Canada, director of the Royal Canadian Military Institute, and member of the College of Electors of the University of Toronto.

She was the recipient of the Queen Elizabeth II Silver Jubilee Medal, 125th Anniversary of the Confederation of Canada Medal, the Queen Elizabeth II Golden Jubilee Medal, the Queen's Diamond Jubilee Medal, the Canadian Forces' Decoration and the Commissionaires Long Service Medal.

=== Major Sandra L. Bullock ===
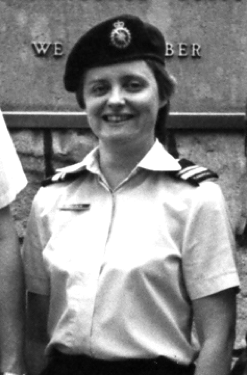
Major Sandra L. Bullock

When the inauguration of the new Intelligence Company in Toronto (2 Int Coy) took place on October 29, 1993 with MGen J. Vernon and MGen Reginald J.G. Weeks present to sign, Major Sandra L. Bullock became the first female commanding officer of an intelligence unit in Canada. She first joined the Intelligence Company 20 years earlier in 1974 as a private in the Army Reserve. She completed her Reserve Intelligence Officer Course in 1986 and was assigned Intelligence Branch Number 700. She retired in 1997. Since retiring, she served as president of The Warriors' Day Parade Council.

== Commanding officers ==
1. Maj S.L. Bullock CD, 1993-1996
2. Maj R.C. Armstrong CD, 1996-1999
3. Maj L.D. Robertson CD, 1999-2002
4. Maj R.A. Roach CD, 2002-2005
5. Maj D.F Agnew CD, 2005-2008
6. Maj P.E.D Nicholson CD, 2008-2012
7. Maj L.D. Robertson CD, 2012-2016
8. Maj D.A.M. Johnston CD, 2016-2018
9. Maj I.K. Chen CD, 2018-2021
10. Maj J.F. Curry CD, 2021-2024
11. Maj A.H.K. Wong CD, 2024–Present

== Sergeant majors ==
1. WO A. Black CD
2. WO T. Armstrong CD
3. WO R. Fonger CD
4. WO N. Procenko CD
5. MWO R.D. Santos CD
6. MWO A. Tanchak CD, 2016-2019
7. MWO K. Kalk CD, 2019-2022
8. MWO R. Kambo CD, 2022–2025
9. MWO M. Pankatz CD, 2025-Present

== Honorary lieutenant colonels ==
1. H LCol Norman Cohen CD, 1998-2007
2. H LCol David A. Rubin KStJ QC, 2007-2013
3. H LCol Gregory J.M. Perkell, 2013-2018
4. H LCol Donald C.F. Stewart, 2018-2024
5. H LCol Jessica Clark Barrow, 2025 - Present

== Museum ==
The 2 Intelligence Company and Camp X Museum is located at Casa Loma in Toronto. The museum consists of eight display cases: five that cover 2 Int Coy (and predecessor units) historical time periods, three that focus on Camp X, and scale model Camp X diorama.

== Camp X ==
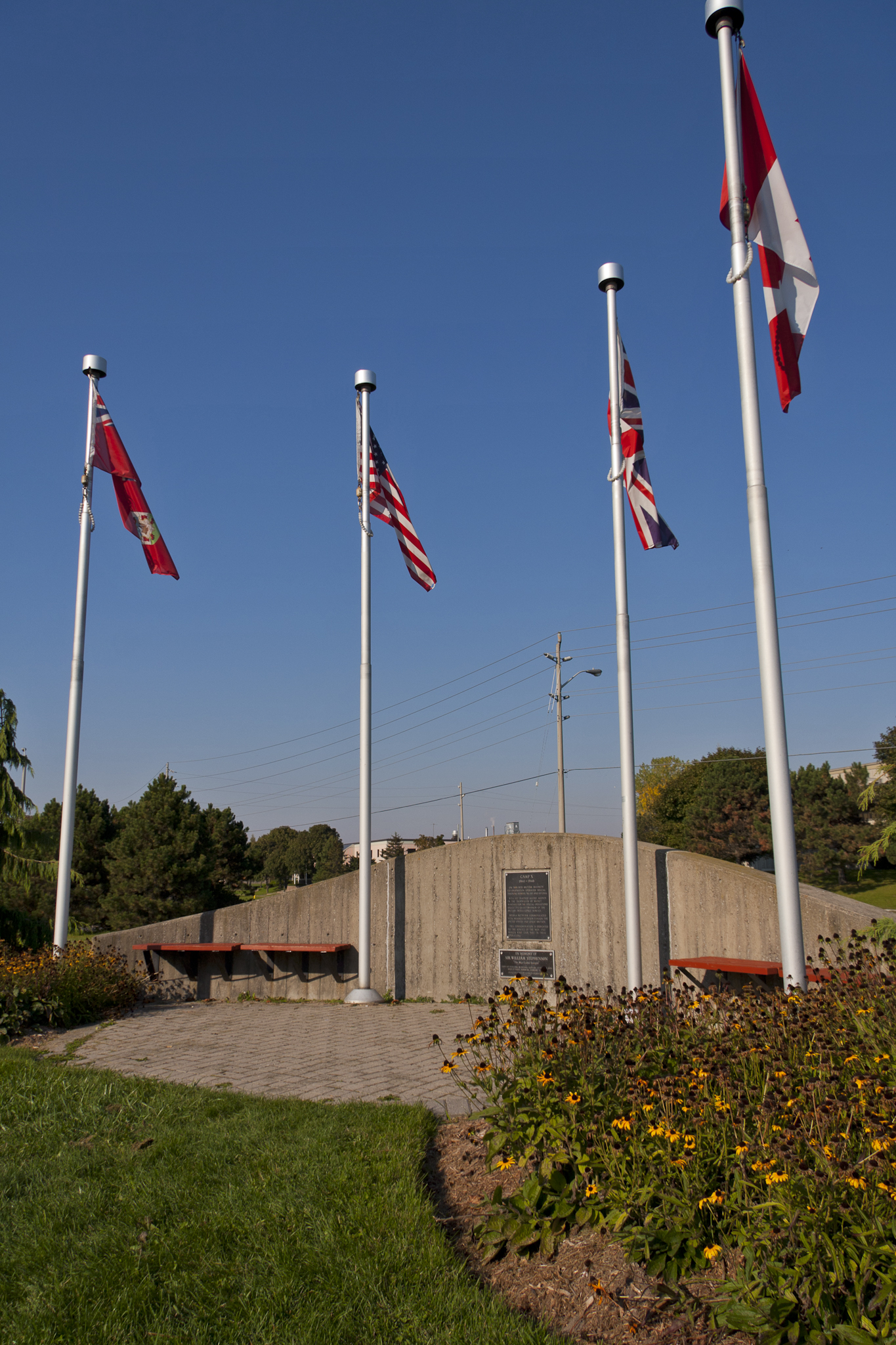
Monument at the site of Camp X in Whitby, Ontario

2 Intelligence Company conducts the annual Remembrance Day parade at Intrepid Park, the site of a World War II commando and espionage training site known as Camp X (or Special Training School 103 as it was officially known).

Many in the intelligence world consider Camp X to be the finest espionage training camp of the Second World War. It is said that the U.S. Central Intelligence Agency named its training facility the 'Farm' as homage to Camp X, the first school of its kind in North America.

Founded by Sir William Stephenson (more popularly known by his codename 'The Man Called Intrepid'), Camp X operated from 1941 to 1946 as a vital co-operative training ground for agents in Canadian, British and American service, who were inserted deep in Nazi-occupied Europe. Over 500 agents trained at Camp X before going on to work as secret agents, security personnel, intelligence officers, or psychological warfare experts, serving in clandestine operations in German-occupied Europe, supporting the efforts of underground resistance movements, or monitoring Nazi propaganda elsewhere.

Trainees at the camp learned sabotage techniques, subversion, intelligence gathering, lock picking, explosives training, radio communications, encode/decode, recruiting techniques for partisans, the art of silent killing and unarmed combat. Camp X offered no parades for its graduates and none were ever publicly recognized for their accomplishments.

Agents were not protected by the Geneva Convention relative to the Treatment of Prisoners of War and many were captured, tortured, and executed by hostile forces. Approximately half of them did not return from their missions.

A monument was erected in 1984 to honour the men and women of Camp X. It is surrounded by four flags: that of Bermuda (where Sir William Stephenson lived for many decades) and those of wartime Allies the United States, Canada and Britain. The annual parade at this memorial honours the service of the fallen soldiers and the veterans who trained at this site, but could never be publicly recognized for their service during their lifetime.

Camp X was also the site of Hydra, a sophisticated top-secret communications relay station that facilitated the transmission of Allied sensitive and secret information during the war, and continued to operate until 1969. Built and run by Canadian electrical engineer Benjamin de Forest Bayly, it was considered one of the world's most advanced communications centres at that time.

In the fall of 1945, the Royal Canadian Mounted Police delivered to Camp X one of its most informative visitors, Igor Gouzenko, a Russian embassy cypher-clerk who defected to Canada. During an extensive debriefing, Igor revealed the magnitude of an elaborate Soviet espionage operation in Canada.

In March 2012 Parks Canada designated "Camp X" a National Historic Event.

== The Garden of Remembrance ==
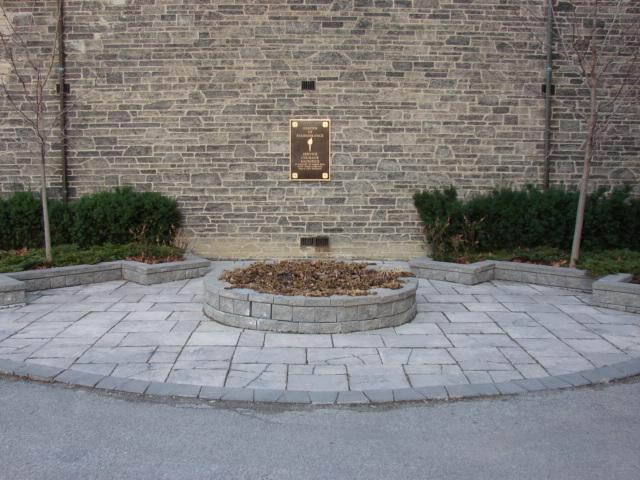
Garden of Remembrance

On September 15, 2004, alumni veterans from the Soldiers' Tower Committee and members of 2 Intelligence Company held a ceremony to dedicate the Pickersgill-Macalister Garden of Remembrance at the foot of Soldiers' Tower to the memory of Captain John MacAlister and Captain Frank Pickersgill. MacAlister and Pickersgill were members of 2 Intelligence Company who were executed in the Buchenwald concentration camp by the German Gestapo, after being parachuted into France for the SOE prior to D-Day. A plaque at the garden displays the following inscription: "This garden is in memory of those who gave their lives for peace and freedom. It was originally dedicated to the memory of Captain John Kenneth Macalister (University College BA 1936) and Captain Frank Herbert Dedrick Pickersgill (University College MA 1938)".

The late University College principal Douglas LePan (BA 1935, DLitt 1990, DLitt Sac. Hon. 1997) a veteran and award-winning poet, had known Macalister as a student, and was chiefly responsible for the creation of the Pickersgill-Macalister Memorial Garden on the west side of Soldiers' Tower. In 1995 LePan published a long verse drama about MacAlister titled MacAlister, or Dying in the Dark.

== Centennial Cannon ==
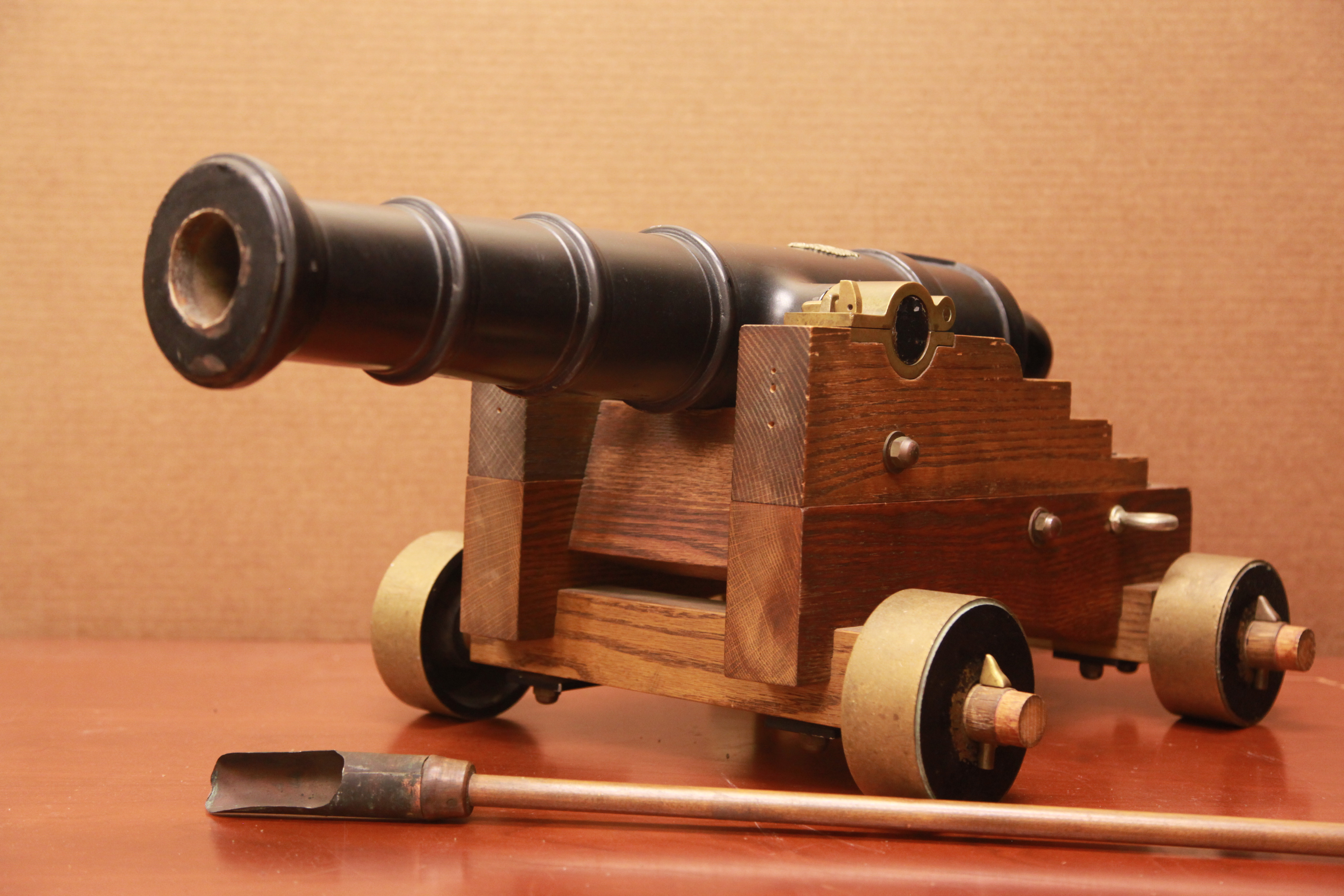
Canadian Intelligence Corps' Centennial Cannon

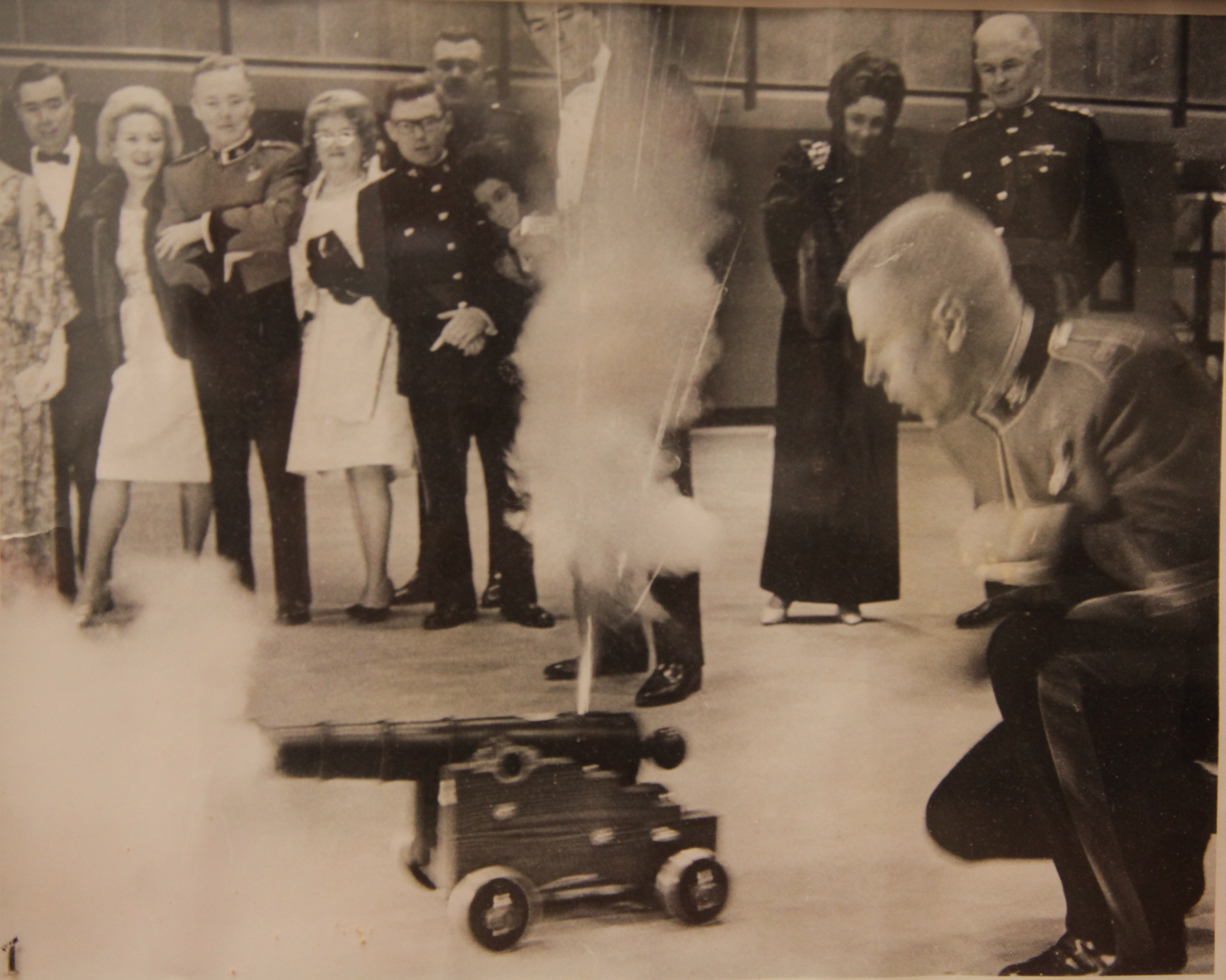
Toronto Garrison Ball 1967

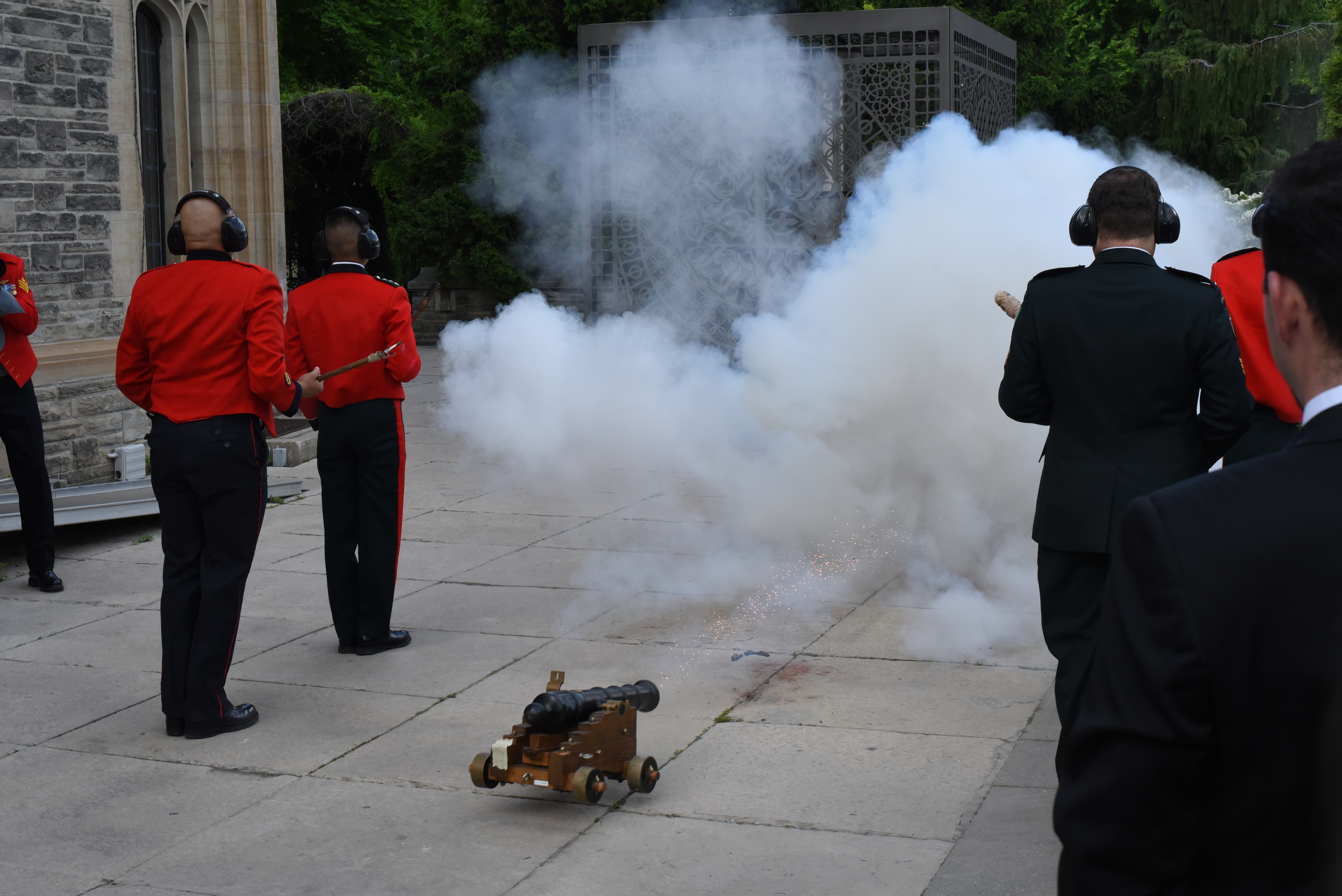
Centennial Cannon being fired at Casa Loma, May 2024

The Intelligence Corps' Centennial Cannon was produced by Compton House Limited as an operational muzzle-loading cannon to be fired for the Canadian Centennial. It is a George III one-pounder, however it carries the Canadian Intelligence Corps crest in place of the George III cipher. Two C INT C "collar dogs" are mounted on the forward face of the carriage. The squat 30-inch barrel is mounted on an oak carriage, fitted with bronze wheels, trunion caps and hardware. The barrel is cast in iron, with drawn steel bore tube for reinforcement. It weighs 83 pounds.

The Centennial Cannon was proved on December 4, 1966, at Aurora, Ontario, by Duncan Webster, Historian, Antique Arms Expert and Curator of the Canadiana Gallery of the Royal Ontario Museum. The cannon is the first muzzle loading cannon ever produced in Canada, with the exception of some miniatures and replicas made privately by collectors.

The gun was given by Duncan F. Cameron, a retired officer of 2 Intelligence Company, to the unit Officers' Mess to mark Canada's Centennial. He presented the gun to Major Wilford C. Wheeler, commanding officer of 2 Intelligence Company at the unit's Christmas Ball, December 16, 1966, at which time it was fired. It was also fired on February 24, 1967, to officially open the Toronto Garrison Officers' Centennial Ball at Moss Park Armoury. It is used by the unit to mark ceremonial occasions, and was fired at a fundraising event at Casa Loma in 2024.

The gun is on display in the museum at Casa Loma, in Toronto.

== See also ==
- Intelligence Branch (Canadian Forces)
- 3 Intelligence Company
- 4 Intelligence Company
- 6 Intelligence Company
