= Victor Brereton Rivers =

Canadian Army officer

- Born: 2 February 1860; Brockville, Canada West
- Died: 25 September 1911 (of TB) Buried in Kingston at Cateraquai Cemetery
- Allegiance: Canada
- Branch: Corps of Guides (Canada)
- Rank: Lieutenant Colonel
- Conflicts: North-West Rebellion: Battle of Fish Creek; Battle of Batoche

Lieutenant Colonel Victor Brereton Rivers (2 February 1860 - 25 September 1911) was the first Intelligence Staff Officer of the Canadian militia on 6 February 1901. His staff work led shortly after, on 1 April 1903, to the formation of the Corps of Guides, a forerunner of the Canadian Forces Intelligence Branch.

== Early life ==
He was born 2 February 1860 and lived in Broockville, Canada West. He was educated as part of the first class at the Royal Military College of Canada in Kingston, Ontario, student No. 10, one of the "Old Eighteen". He entered the college on 1 June 1876. Since cadets received their numbers based on their standings in the entrance examinations, he was 10 of 18. As a sergeant, having completed his full period of instruction at the College, he was granted a second-class certificate of graduation dated 30 June 1880. The Dominion Annual Register and Review recorded that the aggregate number of marks he obtained was 24274 (honours).

== Career ==
He became a career soldier with the Canadian Permanent Active Militia, as a lieutenant in 'A' Battery, which operated the first Gatling Gun to be used in combat in Canada. He was a veteran of the Battle of Fish Creek (24 April 1885) and the Battle of Batoche (5–12 May 1885). At the Battle of Fish Creek, District of Saskatchewan, the Dominion forces under General Middleton attempting to quell Louis Riel's North-West Rebellion retreated. At the Battle of Batoche, District of Saskatchewan, the Dominion forces defeated the Métis' attempt to maintain Aboriginal independence in the disputed "Canadian" North-West Territories. Portions of letters he sent to his wife Maud from the front were posted in the Brockville newspaper of the time.

He was elected president of the Royal Military College Club in 1891.

During the Second Boer War in South Africa (1899–1902), Canadian mounted troops gathered information of intelligence value with the Strathcona’s Horse and British scout units. Canadian intelligence efforts in South Africa led to his appointment on 6 February 1901 as the first Intelligence Staff Officer of the Canadian Militia. He reported to the first Director General of Military Intelligence (DGMI) Brevet-Major William A.C. Denny, Royal Army Service Corps. His staff work led shortly after, on 1 April 1903, to the formation of the Corps of Guides (Canada), "The Guides should be intelligent men and capable of active work with a knowledge of the topographical features of the country as well as the roads, the country between the roads, sidepaths, names of farmers, etc. in the area, and when possible, should be in possession of a horse". This organization was the forerunner of the Canadian Forces Intelligence Branch. He served as a Lieutenant-Colonel in the Militia headquarters staff, Ottawa. He died of tuberculosis in 1911.

== Family ==
He married Maud Gertrude Gildersleeve, born 26 March 1864, who after his death never remarried and died 19 December 1954 at age 90. Their home in Ottawa, Ontario, was at 252 Daly Avenue.

They had four children: Helen who died at 2 months of age; Marjorie, born 11 August 1889 who died 6 September 1911 of tuberculosis at age 20 (nineteen days before her father); Charles, who served in WW1 as a pilot and who died of stomach cancer in 1967 at age 72 having had no children; and the youngest, Victor Henry, who served in the trenches during WW1 where he was gassed but survived and died in 1994 at age 96. He had two children Victor B. Rivers and Timothy C. Rivers.

Maud's father was Charles Fuller Gildersleeve, originally a lawyer but became general manager of the Northern Navigation Company.
