= 3 Intelligence Company =

3 Intelligence Company Canadian Forces
- Active: November 4, 1995 – present
- Country: Canada
- Branch: Intelligence
- Type: Army
- Role: Combat Intelligence
- Part of: 5th Canadian Division
- Garrison/HQ: Halifax
- March: Silver and Green by Capt J.M. Gayfer

Insignia
- Addreviation: 3 Int Coy

3 Intelligence Company (abbreviated 3 Int Coy) is a line unit reporting directly to the 5th Canadian Division which is headquartered in Halifax, Nova Scotia. The Intelligence Operators & Intelligence Officers of the unit train regularly to augment their Regular Force counterparts on domestic and foreign operations.

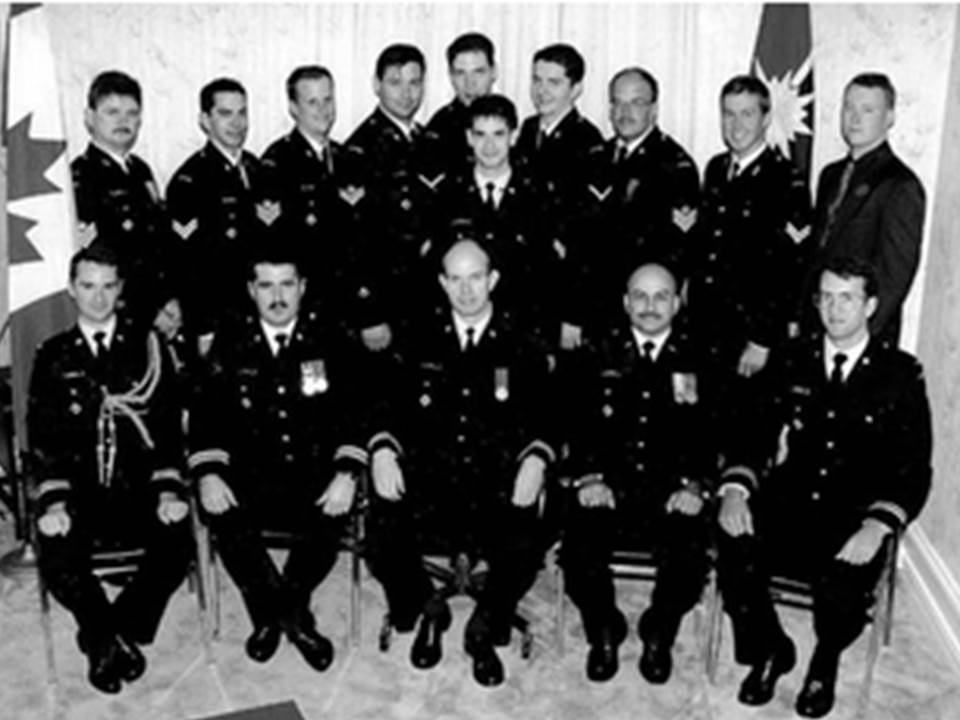
3 Int Coy – November 4, 1995

Tracing its lineage to the original 3 Intelligence Company (1950) that was dissolved at Unification, the current unit was stood up on November 4, 1995 at a parade near the old library building in Royal Artillery Park, downtown Halifax.

== Lineage ==
The Canadian Army announced the formation of 3 Intelligence Company on February 27, 1950 and the unit was formally stood up on November 15, 1950. The first commanding officer was Major Edward Fairweather Harrington who had formerly served in the Halifax Rifles (23rd Armoured Regiment). Maj Harrington served in the First World War with the Royal Flying Corps, and in the Second World War with the Canadian Intelligence Corps. The first home of the unit was at the Queen Street Armouries.

== See also ==
- Military history of Canada
- History of the Canadian Army
- Canadian Forces
- Intelligence Branch (Canadian Forces)
- 2 Intelligence Company
- 4 Intelligence Company
- 6 Intelligence Company
