= Charles Hamilton Mitchell =

Canadian military officer and engineer

Charles Hamilton Mitchell CB, CMG, DSO
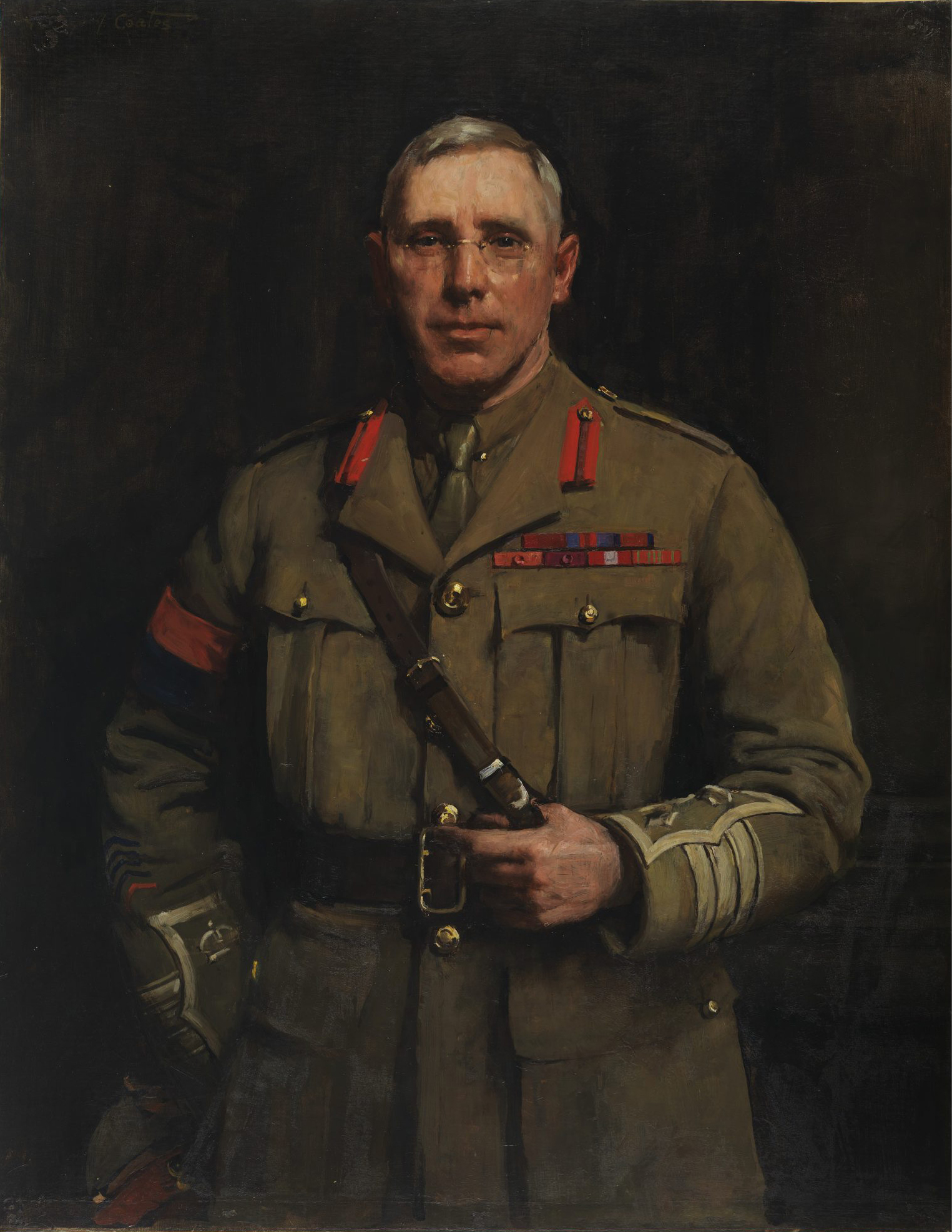

Dean of the University of Toronto Faculty of Applied Science and Engineering
- In office 1919–1941
- Preceded by: William Hodgson Ellis
- Succeeded by: Clarence Richard Young

Personal details
- Born: 18 February 1872 Petrolia, Ontario
- Died: 26 August 1941 (aged 69) Toronto, Ontario
- Education: University of Toronto
- Military career
- Burial place: Mount Pleasant Cemetery
- Allegiance: Canada
- Branch: Corps of Guides (Canada)
- Service years: 1899-1919
- Rank: Brigadier General

Charles Hamilton Mitchell, CB, CMG, DSO (1872–1941) was a civil engineer and an intelligence officer of the Canadian Armed Forces in World War I, with the rank of brigadier-general. He served in France, Italy, and England during the war as an intelligence officer, winning several honours, becoming the most decorated intelligence officer in Canadian military intelligence history. After the war, he returned to Canada to serve as the dean of the Faculty of Applied Science and Engineering at the University of Toronto. He helped greatly expand and improve the faculty during his tenure and served in that role until 1941.

== Early life and education ==
Charles Hamilton Mitchell was born to George Mitchell and Agnes Becket in 1872 at Petrolia, Ontario. His father, George Mitchell, was a clergyman and a graduate of Upper Canada College and the University of Toronto in mathematics. He was the great-grandson of a United Empire Loyalist.

He attended the School of Practical Science at the University of Toronto, studying civil engineering at the school. He received his SPS diploma in 1892 and his B.A.Sc. in 1894. After graduating from the University of Toronto, he worked as a civil engineer (officially qualifying as a C.E. in 1898), specializing in hydraulic and hydro-electric power development. He took employment as the assistant city engineer in Niagara Falls and later served as the city engineer. After leaving that post, he set up a Toronto-based consulting firm in 1906 in partnership with his brother Percival, working largely in hydroelectric power plant construction. He was responsible for the design and construction of several plants in the Maritimes, Ontario, and Western Canada.

In 1901 he married Myra Ethlyn Stanton, daughter of John N. Stanton and Martha Hubbs of St Catharines. They had one son, Donald Russell Mitchell in 1902, though Donald Russell survived for only 3 weeks.

== Military service ==
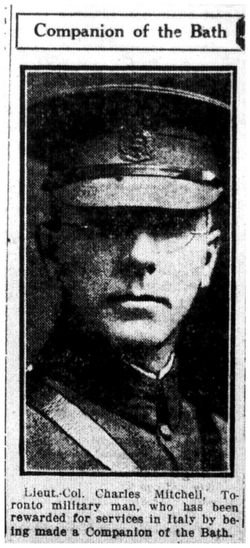
Newspaper clipping of Charles Mitchell after being made a Companion of the Order of Bath in 1918.

Mitchell joined the Militia in 1899. Prior to World War I, he served in the 44th Lincoln and Welland Regiment and the Corps of Guides. Upon the outbreak of war in 1914 Mitchell attested to serve in the Canadian Expeditionary Force (CEF) and was appointed general staff officer (3rd grade) on staff of the Headquarters, 1st Canadian Division. When the Canadian Corps was formed in August 1915, Col. Mitchell was sent to its Headquarters as G.S.O.2 (Int), the senior Intelligence appointment in the CEF. He therefore became involved from the very beginning in establishing a corps intelligence organization. He had no Canadian precedent to guide him, although he could call on his experience in First Division and on the considerable help he received from his British counterparts.

In September 1916 he became the head of the Intelligence Branch of the Second Army as a colonel and in October 1918 he was promoted to brigadier general and served as a senior intelligence officer in the War Office in London following posts in France and Italy. He returned to the Canadian Army in June 1919, having won numerous honours and decorations, including French, Belgian and Italian awards. He was appointed to the Order of the Bath on 3 June 1918, while serving on the headquarters of the General Staff of the British Army in Italy with the CEF. He remains the most decorated intelligence officer in Canadian military intelligence history.

== Postwar work ==
Prior to his service in the war, Mitchell had represented engineering graduates of the University of Toronto on the Senate from 1901 to 1913. From 1913 to 1919, he served on the board of governors of the university until his appointment as dean.

After the war, he officially took up the position as dean of the Faculty of Applied Science, beginning his term in 1919. Mitchell never had any experience in academic administration, but he quickly grew into the role. His exemplary service record also lent him authority early in his term, when fully half the student population consisted of returning veterans.

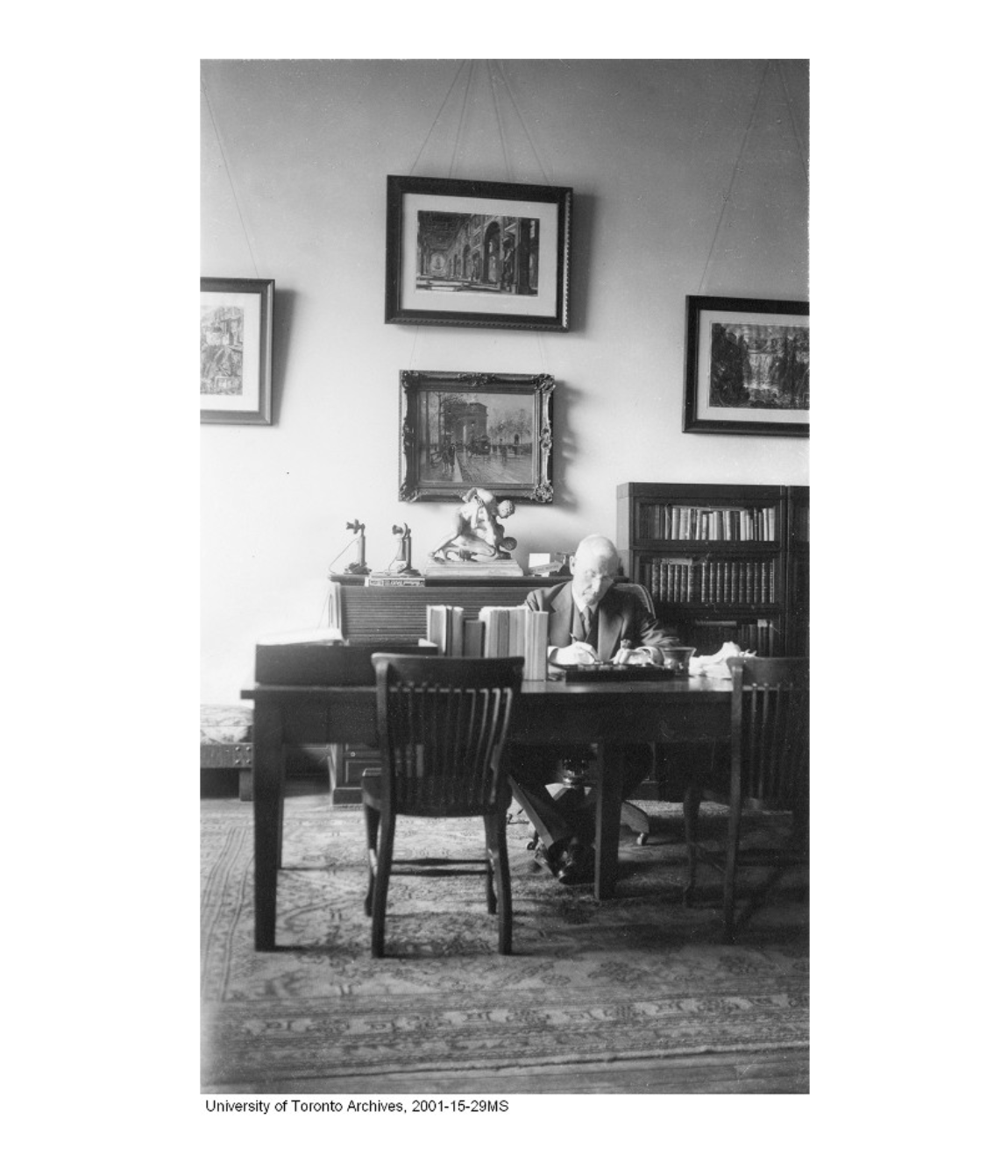
Charles H Mitchell in his University of Toronto study in 1940.

Mitchell oversaw the faculty during the entirety of the interwar period. In this time, the faculty grew from a student body of 772 in 1919 to 961 in 1940, despite rising academic standards and the effects of The Great Depression. The programs of engineering, physics, and mining geology were also added during this period.

In addition to his academic role, Mitchell was involved in various public duties. In 1924 he was with American representatives on the Joint Board of Engineers to study the feasibility of a St. Lawrence waterway. He also served on the board of trade while he was dean. Mitchell retired in 1941, shortly before his death. He was succeeded by C.R. Young.

== Death ==
General Mitchell died 26 August 1941, and his wife 1 May 1958.

== Honours and awards ==
- Companion of the Order of Bath (1918)
- Companion of the Order of St Michael and St George (1917)
- Distinguished Service Order (1916)
- Officer of the Order of Leopold (Belgium) (1917)
- Croix de Guerre (Belgium) (1918)
- Officer of the Legion of Honour (France) (1916)
- Officer of the Order of the Crown (Italy) (1918)
- War Merit Cross (Italy) (1919)
- Several Mentions in Dispatches (1916, 1916, 1917, 1917, 1918, 1919)
