= Corps of Guides (Canada) =

Canadian army administrative unit

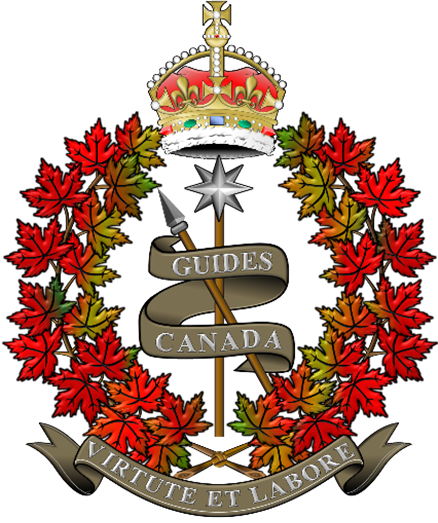
- Badge of the Corps of Guides
- Active: 1 April 1903 to 31 March 1929
- Country: Canada
- Type: Mounted corps
- Role: Non-Permanent Active Militia
- Mottos: Virtute et labore (Latin for 'by virtue and labour')
- Colors: Scarlet and khaki

The Corps of Guides was an administrative corps of the Non-Permanent Active Militia in Canada. It was responsible for both intelligence staff duties as well as the collection of military intelligence for the defence of Canada through its mounted detachments (later cyclist companies) dispersed throughout the military districts of Canada. The customs and traditions of the Corps of Guides are perpetuated in the Canadian Army today by the Canadian Intelligence Corps.

== Formation ==
Lieutenant-Colonel Victor Brereton Rivers, a former officer cadet at the Royal Military College of Canada was one of the first of a small band of Canadian military intelligence officers serving in an organization that was in effect the forerunner of Canadian Forces Intelligence Branch as it is known today. He carried out the necessary staff work which led to the formation of the "Canadian Corps of Guides" (C of G) as authorized by "General Order 61 of 01 April 1903." This order directed that at each of the 12 military districts across Canada there would be a District Intelligence Officer (DIO) whose duties included command of the Guides Mounted Detachment in his district.

The C of G was a mounted corps of Non-Permanent Active Militia with precedence immediately following the Canadian Engineers. The officers, non-commissioned officers (NCOs), and men were appointed individually to the headquarters staffs of various commands and districts to carry out intelligence duties. From the authorizing order, it is apparent that one of the functions of the C of G was to ensure that in the event of war on Canadian soil, the defenders would possess detailed and accurate information of the area of operations.

The ranks of the C of G were filled quickly, and by the end of 1903, the General Officer Commanding the militia reported, "The formation of the Corps has been attended by the best possible results. Canada is now being covered by a network of Intelligence and capable men, who will be of great service to the country in collecting information of a military character and in fitting themselves to act as guides in their own districts to forces in the field. I have much satisfaction in stating that there is much competition among the best men in the country for admission into the Corps of Guides. Nobody is admitted into the Corps unless he is a man whose services are likely to be of real use to the country."

The training of the corps began at once under the supervision of the Director of Intelligence. Special courses stressed the organization of foreign armies, military reconnaissance, and the staff duties of intelligence officers. Instruction in drill and parade movements was kept to a minimum, although this was covered in other training that Guides officers and NCOs were required to complete before promotion. Various GOs in the early 1900s amended the organization of the Corps so that eventually one Mounted Detachment was established for each division.

Each Military District was sub-divided into local "Guide Areas". The head of this organization was "a Director General of Military Intelligence (DGMI)," under the control of the General Officer Commanding (GOC). "The DGMI was charged with the collection of information on the military resources of Canada, the British Empire, and foreign countries."

"The first DGMI was Brevet-Major William A.C. Denny, Royal Army Service Corps, psc, a veteran of South Africa." His staff included LCol Victor Brereton Rivers as ISO and two AISOs, Captain A.C. Caldwell and Captain W.B. Anderson responsible for the Information and Mapping Branches respectively. They were supported by three lieutenants, a sergeant and two NCOs. This was the basic organization for military intelligence at the national level with which Canada entered the First World War. Captain R.M. Collins, the Secretary of the Australian Defence Department, who had recently visited Canada, reported that:

"The Canadian Forces were run by a Militia Council, similarly constituted to the Australian Military Board with the Minister as President and the First Military Member. The Chief of the General Staff (CGS) had the responsibility to "advise on questions of general military policy; Intelligence, and preparation for war; as well as the education of staff officers. Of particular interest was the fact that there were two Intelligence Officers on the Canadian Staff, assisted by a Corps of Guides element (consisting of 185 Militia officers) which had been raised on 1 April 1903."

A report was prepared following his visit, recommending that provision be made for a Director of Education and a Director of Intelligence, as this was the only way that the many duties assigned to the Chief of Intelligence could be properly discharged. He pointed to the Canadian example as a sound arrangement to emulate.

The Canadian C of G were responsible for the collection of military information, and their duties were described as follows: "The Guides should be intelligent men and capable of active work with a knowledge of the topographical features of the country as well as the roads, the country between the roads, sidepaths, names of farmers, etc., in the area, and when possible, should be in possession of a horse."

== Uniform and insignia ==
Prior to the outbreak of war, the full dress uniform of the Canadian Corps of Guides comprised a khaki "lancer style" tunic with scarlet plastron, cuffs and collars. The tunic was piped in scarlet, as were the khaki trousers. A white Wolseley helmet with bronze spike and scarlet/khaki puggaree were parts of the corps' distinctive full dress.

== The First World War ==
When Canada entered the Great War on 4 August 1914, "the Corps of Guides volunteered for service in a body and a concentration...moved to Camp Valcartier as part of the general mobilization" then in progress. The Guides were organized for employment as a domestic field intelligence and scouting force within Canada and were therefore not required in France and Belgium. It became evident at Valcartier that the NPAM did not contain a Cyclist Company; this was despite the fact that Cyclist Companies had been a standard component of the Mounted Troops of an infantry division in the British Army since 1908. While the Guides were surplus to the requirements of the Canadian Expeditionary Force they became the logical choice to support the establishment of the Cyclist Company required of an infantry division in the British Expeditionary Force (World War I).

The 1st Canadian Divisional Cyclist Company was therefore formed at Valcartier to be part of the Divisional Mounted Troops of the 1st Canadian Division, with most of its officers and many of its other ranks coming from the Corps of Guides. The use of the Guides officers to provide the leadership backbone of the 1st Canadian Divisional Cyclist Company was logical, as their duties were expected to be similar, with scouting and reconnaissance being key doctrinal tasks for both the Guides and the Cyclists. The birth of the 1st Canadian Divisional Cyclist Company at Valcartier started what became an enduring connection between the Guides and the Cyclists.

General Sir Arthur Currie recorded:

"The Corps of Guides was absorbed into existing Units and formations. Officers to the number of about thirty were absorbed into Staff posts and various regimental and special duties. Owing to their special training in reconnaissance and scout duties generally, the officers appointed to Staff duties were utilized essentially as Staff Captains for Intelligence and General Staff Officers. Non-Commissioned Officers and men were absorbed into cavalry, horse artillery and various other Staff duties and, subsequently, into the Cyclist Corps which later became the natural channel for the absorption of the Guide personnel."

After the initial rush of mobilization at Valcartier, Guides units were activated for home defence duties under Order in Council PC 2067/2068. Their domestic role was split into two distinct parts. The first task was to provide Counterintelligence, to identify threats to Canada and the Allied war effort from foreign agents on Canadian soil; this task endured throughout the entire war. No 11 Mounted Detachment of the Corps of Guides was formally called-out on Active Service under General Order (GO) in 1914, to perform local security duties within Vancouver, British Columbia. Primary source material from across Canada during this period clearly indicates that this internal security and counterintelligence task was common across the majority of Canada's Military Districts, including along the Welland Canal and in Halifax, Nova Scotia.

The second task for the Corps of Guides was to recruit and train drafts for the Cyclist units of the Canadian Expeditionary Force in the field, notably the 1st, 2nd and 3rd Canadian Divisional Cyclist Companies as well as the Canadian Reserve Cyclist Company, but also the Canadian Corps Cyclist Battalion. In 1917 the CEF established 10 Cyclist Depot Platoons across Canada to recruit and train men for the CEF's Corps of Cyclists under GO, taking over this task from the Corps of Guides. Nevertheless, the connection between the Guides and Cyclists within the NPAM had been made and would be the keystone of the Guides' future in the years which followed.

== Post-War Conversion to Cyclists ==
In the aftermath of the First World War, it was realized that the Guides were unlikely to be called upon for service under the precepts which had created it. After the war, the Director of Military Operations and Intelligence (DMO&I), Col J. Sutherland-Brown, had planned to convert the Mounted Detachments of the Guides into Cyclist Companies for use as divisional-level Mounted Troops for security and protection duties, all while retaining the Corps' role as it related to military intelligence staff duties. The Otter Commission determined that this was the most viable course of action for the future of the Guides. In 1920 General Orders 75/20 and 208/20 were issued, converting all Mounted Detachments of the Guides into Cyclist Companies under the pre-existing construct of the Corps of Guides. The concept of employment for the newly created Cyclist companies was similar to the previous Mounted Detachments; Cyclist Companies were assigned to the Divisions and Brigades of the various Military Districts of Canada for security as well as screening and protection duties.

As with most of the NPAM, the inter-war years were lean for the Corps of Guides. No summer training camps were authorized in 1920, and between 1922 and 1924 summer training was restricted to 50% of the establishment. In 1926, Cyclist Company establishments grew to one Major, one Capt, four Lieutenants, one Warrant Officer level 2, one Company Quarter-Master Sergeant, one Sergeant (artificer), four Sergeants, eight Corporals, one driver, two cooks, six batmen, and 88 Privates. Equipment consisted of 2 horses, 117 bicycles, and 1 wagon. The horses, wagon, and, at least in the early days, the bicycles, had to be hired for the summer camp training period. The organization of the Guides' Cyclist Companies was much the same as it had been in wartime, consisting of an HQ of 10, and 4 platoons of 27, for a total of 118 all ranks.

Junior officer training included normal military subjects, plus instruction in such special-to-corps subjects as characteristics of Cyclists, platoon drill with bicycles, Cyclists in reconnaissance, employment of Cyclists for protection, tactical action of Cyclists, map-reading and field sketching, employment of Cyclists with corps or divisional Troops, the role of the Unit in war, and almost as an afterthought, Intelligence in peace and war. Captains had to know these subjects and, in addition, become proficient in dismounted action and the employment of Cyclists in coast defence. Majors had to have a full knowledge of Intelligence in peace and war. NCOs took a modified version of the subaltern's course.

== Disbandment ==
Throughout the 1920s, the NPAM struggled to appeal to Canadians and the Cyclists were no exception. Small units like the Cyclist Companies of the Corps of Guides cost a great deal to administer for little apparent return; this was particularly true for a Corps which although instrumental in fielding Canada's wartime Cyclist units had itself not deployed abroad on active service. With recruiting declining, the government decided to disband the Corps of Guides. In a twist of irony, the Guides were done-in by peace and not war, with General Order 191 (issued: 1 December 1928), disbanding the Corps of Guides effective 31 March 1929. The disbanding of the Guides meant that only a small intelligence staff was left in Ottawa and in some of the Military Districts to carry out a military intelligence function for the nation.

== Corps of Guides prize ==
The Corps of Guides (Canada) prize was awarded from 1926 to 1941 (except 1940) to the gentleman cadet at the Royal Military College of Canada in Kingston, Ontario earning the greatest number of marks in map reading and field sketching throughout his whole course. Between 1941 and 1952, no awards were made. Thereafter, the Corps of Guides was awarded for surveying and field sketching.

== Perpetuation ==
The customs and traditions of the Corps of Guides are perpetuated in the Canadian Army today by the Canadian Intelligence Corps (the army members of the Canadian Armed Forces Intelligence Branch), with many units of the Corps (particularly those of the Primary Reserve) perpetuating the historic Mounted Detachments and Cyclist Companies of their respective geographic areas.

== Notable Members ==
- Charles Hamilton Mitchell, CB, CMG, DSO
- Victor Brereton Rivers
- Johnson Lindsay Rowlett Parsons, CMG, DSO

== Sources ==
- Harold A. Skaarup, Out of Darkness – Light, a History of Canadian Military Intelligence, volume one, Pre-Confederation to 1982. Lincoln, Nebraska, iUniverse.com, 2005.
- Hahn, Major J. E. he Intelligence Service Within the Canadian Corps 1914-1918. Toronto, Ontario: Macmillan, 1930.
