= Intelligence Branch =

Unified intelligence branch of the Canadian Armed Forces

- Branche du service du renseignement
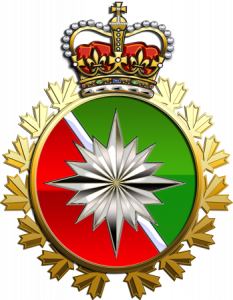
- Badge of the Intelligence Branch
- Active: 1982–present
- Country: Canada
- Branch: Canadian Armed Forces
- Type: Personnel branch
- Role: Military intelligence
- Mottos: E tenebris lux (Latin for 'Out of the darkness, light')
- March: "E Tenebris Lux"

The Intelligence Branch (French: Branche du service du renseignement) is a personnel branch of the Canadian Forces (CF) that is concerned with providing relevant and correct information to enable commanders to make decisions.

The branch works in a variety of challenging positions, at home and abroad, meeting the needs of commanders and operational planners of the Canadian Forces at all levels and in all environments. Since the branch's inception, members have deployed overseas to Bosnia and Herzegovina, Haiti, Somalia, Rwanda, Timor-Leste, Latvia, Ukraine, Mali, Kuwait, Afghanistan, and Iraq. Branch members have also deployed domestically on a number of operations. These include tasks related to the ice storms in Quebec, floods in Winnipeg, fires in British Columbia and the Canadian military's response to the COVID-19 pandemic.

== History ==
=== Early intelligence units ===
The first intelligence collection unit in Canada was the "4th Troop of Volunteer Cavalry of Montreal (or Guides)", formed on 7 February 1862. Renamed "The Royal Guides or Governor General's Body Guard for Lower Canada", and later "The Guides", the unit was disbanded in 1869 after helping to repel Fenian raiders.

During the North-West Rebellion (1885), various irregular cavalry units were used as scouts. One of these scout units, drawn from the Dominion Land Survey, was called the "Intelligence Corps", commanded by Captain Jack Dennis. With a strength of three officers and 30 men performing long-range reconnaissance and light cavalry functions, it was the first unit to be designated an intelligence unit in the British Empire. These scout units, the forerunners of the Fort Garry Horse and North Saskatchewan Regiment, were disbanded by 18 September 1885.

During the Boer War in South Africa, Canadian mounted troops gathered information of intelligence value with Strathcona's Horse and British scout units. Canadian intelligence efforts in South Africa led to the appointment on 6 February 1901 of Lieutenant-Colonel Victor Brereton Rivers, RCA, as the first intelligence staff officer of the Canadian Militia.

On 1 April 1903, the Corps of Guides was created in the Canadian Militia. Under the new structure, a district intelligence officer responsible to director general of military intelligence (DGMI) was appointed to oversee Corps of Guides units established in each of Canada's 12 military districts. The first DGMI, Lieutenant-Colonel W.A.C. Denny, had a very small staff overseeing information collection and mapping, and approximately 185 militia officers serving the Canadian Corps of Guides.

By 1914, the Canadian Corps of Guides totalled some 500 men of all ranks. Because their mounted scout role appeared inappropriate for war in Europe, many Corps of Guides personnel were absorbed into existing units in the Canadian Militia and Canadian Expeditionary Force. Others became intelligence staff officers and non-commissioned officers serving with the British Intelligence Corps. The intelligence system created within the 1st Canadian Division prior to its deployment to France in 1915 served as the basis for the development of intelligence structures generally throughout the Canadian Corps.

After the war, a position for a director of military operations and intelligence was maintained in the Canadian Militia. Corps of Guides units in Canada were converted to cyclist companies charged with protecting the main force form surprise during time of war. After these companies were disbanded on 31 March 1929, a small number of staff continued to perform intelligence duties. In 1932, intelligence staffs of the Royal Canadian Air Force and Militia were amalgamated.

=== Canadian Intelligence Corps ===
When Canada mobilized in September 1939, intelligence structures based on British organizations were rapidly developed. In December 1940, there were about 60 all ranks posted on intelligence duties. Foreseeing the need for 200 intelligence personnel, Major John Page proposed that field security (FS) functions be separated from the Canadian Provost Corps. Page also advocated for an intelligence corps similar to the British Intelligence Corps.

The establishment of the First Canadian Army in April 1942 increased demand for intelligence specialists. On 29 October 1942 the Canadian Intelligence Corps (C Int C) was officially recognized as a corps. Canadians from universities and industry joined the C Int C to participate in diverse intelligence duties. Many became casualties at the Dieppe Raid, in northwestern Europe and the Adriatic. Army intelligence sections or staffs were represented at army, corps, division, and district levels, with seven field security sections in existence as well. By 1943, for the first time in history, Canadian personnel filled all intelligence appointments within Canada's army formations and units.

=== Post-World War II ===
In 1948, the Canadian Militia was authorized six intelligence training companies: No. 1 in Montreal, No. 2 in Toronto, No. 3 in Halifax, No. 4 in Vancouver, No. 5 in Winnipeg, and No. 6 in Edmonton. The mission of these companies was to provide a pool of trained intelligence personnel to augment the Regular Force when needed.

During the 1950s and 1960s, C Int C personnel were engaged in various intelligence roles in Canada, Germany, the United Kingdom, the United States and Cyprus.

After the unification of the Canadian Forces in 1968, the C Int C, the Canadian Provost Corps, and the Air Force Police were united to become the Security Branch. The Canadian Forces School of Intelligence and Security (CFSIS) was formed to train these personnel.

In 1981, the Security Branch was divided into two separate branches: one for intelligence and the other for security. Sir William Stephenson ("A Man Called Intrepid") accepted the appointment as first colonel commandant of the tri-service Intelligence Branch, which was formed on 1 October 1982. The formal re-badging of the branch occurred on 29 October 1982, the 40th anniversary of the birth of the C Int C.

In 2000, a further separation from the Security Branch occurred, with intelligence training moving from CFSIS at CFB Borden to the newly formed Canadian Forces School of Military Intelligence (CFSMI) at CFB Kingston. This ended the formal affiliation of the Intelligence Branch with the military police.

During the War in Afghanistan, the Intelligence Branch fielded the first Canadian all-source intelligence centres, which have today become the gold standard for intelligence support to the Canadian Army on deployed operations.

=== Branch cap badge ===
When the Intelligence Branch was formed in 1982, a new badge was introduced. The colours of scarlet, dark green and white denote the evolution of the branch from the Canadian Corps of Guides, the Canadian Intelligence Corps, and the Canadian Forces Security Branch, respectively. The North Star symbol embodied in the Canadian Intelligence Corps badge is also found in the branch badge, preserving historic ties. The compass rose shape of the badge draws attention to the branch's worldwide scope of responsibilities.

== Branch today ==
The Canadian Forces School of Military Intelligence (CFSMI), based in Kingston, Ontario, is the home of intelligence training for the Canadian Armed Forces. Identical training is provided to both Regular Force and Reserve members. CFSMI's mission is to provide core and specialist intelligence training to officers and non-commissioned members of the Intelligence Branch.

Today, the CAF's technical authority for intelligence is the commander of Canadian Forces Intelligence Command (CFINTCOM), who oversees the military's specialized collection and analysis capabilities. This includes the Canadian Forces Joint Imagery Centre, which is responsible for the production of imagery intelligence, and Joint Task Force X, which is responsible for human intelligence.

Army reservists, employed at 6 Intelligence Company (Edmonton, Vancouver, Winnipeg, and Calgary), 2 Intelligence Company (Toronto) and 7 Intelligence Company (Ottawa), 4 Intelligence Company (platoons in Montreal and Quebec City), 3 Intelligence Company (Halifax, Nova Scotia), make an important contribution to the Intelligence Branch for overseas deployments. As a result, individual movement between Regular and Reserve components is relatively fluid compared with other branches in the CAF.

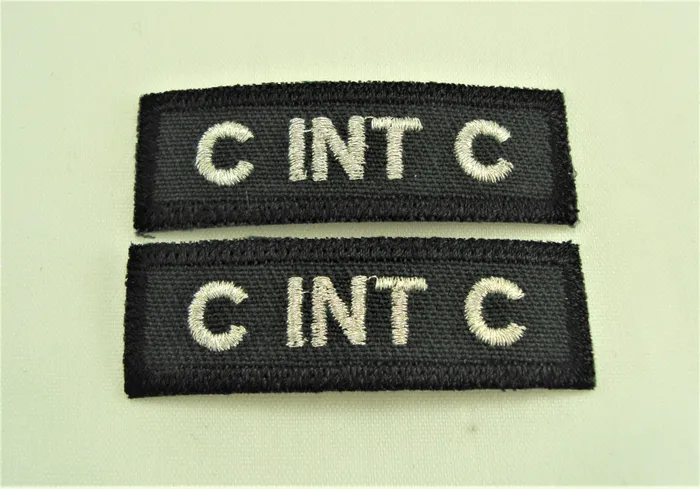
English shoulder title of the Canadian Intelligence Corps

In December 2016, the Canadian Intelligence Corps was re-activated and army-uniformed members of the Intelligence Branch resumed the use of this designation. Prior to this, the shoulder titles on army uniforms in English was "INT" and in French "RENS". The current shoulder title is "C Int C" (English) or "C Rens C" (French).

Naval reservists are also employed as both intelligence officers and intelligence operators across the country at Naval Reserve units.

== See also ==
- Canadian Forces Intelligence Command
- Signals intelligence
- Canadian Security Intelligence Service
- Communications Security Establishment
- RCMP Security Service
- Royal Canadian Mounted Police

== Order of precedence ==
Preceded by Public Affairs Branch	Intelligence Branch	Succeeded by Cadet Instructors Cadre
