= 4 Intelligence Company =

4 Intelligence Company Canadian Forces
- French: 4ième Compagnie du renseignement
- Active: 1994 – present
- Country: Canada
- Branch: Intelligence
- Type: Army
- Role: Combat Intelligence
- Size: Company
- Part of: 2nd Canadian Division
- Garrison/HQ: Garrison Longue-Pointe, Montreal
- March: Silver and Green by Capt J.M. Gayfer

Insignia
- Abbreviation: 4 Int Coy

4 Intelligence Company (4 Int Coy), in French and officially 4ième Compagnie du renseignement (4e Cie de rens), is a Canadian Forces Primary Reserve Intelligence Branch unit headquartered in Montreal, with a platoon at Valcartier Garrison near Quebec City. It is a part of the 2nd Canadian Division. The unit draws its historical lineage from the 4th Troop of Volunteer Cavalry of Montreal (or Guides) that took part in the actions to repel Fenian raiders attempting to invade Canada in 1866.

Members of the unit deploy on domestic and foreign operations, and are primarily responsible for tactical, or combat intelligence.

== Lineage ==
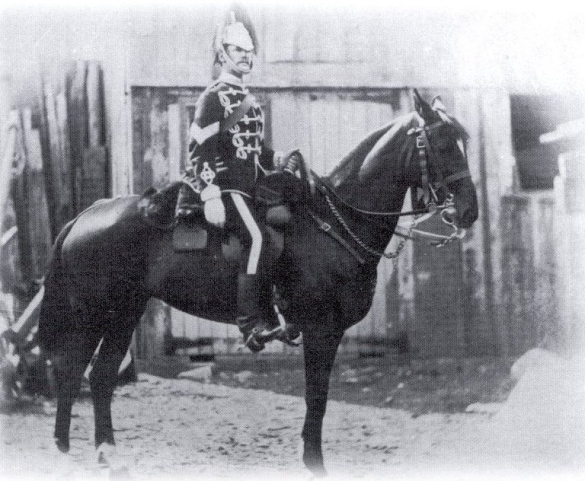
Corporal, Royal Guides, circa 1866

4 Intelligence Company perpetuates the presence of a military intelligence unit in Montreal that can be traced to the original 4th Troop of Volunteer Cavalry of Montreal (or Guides), formed on February 7, 1862. The unit was later renamed The Royal Guides or Governor General's Body Guard for Lower Canada, and later The Guides. The uniform (pictured) combined elements of British Dragoon and Light Dragoon styles. The blue tunic had white frogging and lace. The dragoon-style helmet was in white metal with a white horsehair plume. The unit was disbanded in 1869.

No. 4 Guides Company was established in Montreal when the Canadian Corps of Guides was formed by General Order 61 of April 1, 1903, and was later re-designated No. 4 Cyclist Company. On March 31, 1929 the Corps of Guides was disbanded.

In 1948 No. 1 Intelligence Training Company was formed in Montreal when the Canadian Militia was authorized six Intelligence Training Companies across Canada. With Unification, the amalgamation of the Regular Force Intelligence component with the Provost Corps led to the amalgamation of their militia counterparts. On February 1, 1970 the unit was reduced to a section which continued to support the 2nd Canadian Division headquarters.

In 1994 a new Intelligence company was stood up in Montreal, with a strength of 68 all-ranks, and designated 4ième Compagnie du renseignement (4 Intelligence Company).

== NATO Field Security ==
No. 1 Intelligence Training Company was mobilized in February 1951 to form No. 2 Field Security Section (No. 2 FSS) for service in Europe with the 27 Canadian Infantry Brigade. This FSS was the forerunner of the FSS in the 4 Canadian Mechanized Brigade Group headquarters, which is now the Joint All Source Intelligence Centre (JASIC) supporting 1 Canadian Division. This is the only instance of a Primary Reserve Intelligence Branch unit being mobilized in Canadian military history.

== Badge ==
The 4 Intelligence Company Badge was approved May 1, 1999. The announcement of the Letters Patent was made in Volume III, page 420 of the Canada Gazette. In the badge the traditional colours and compass rose of the Canadian Forces Intelligence Branch are placed within a bordure of fleurs-de-lis, indicating that the unit is based in Quebec. Official use of this badge was rescinded by the Inspector of Canadian Forces Colours and Badges, June 12, 2000.

== Russian T-72 Tank ==
4 Intelligence Company acquired a Russian T-72 tank on February 2, 1996 for full-scale identification training. The tank was originally used for testing and evaluation at CFB Valcartier before it was delivered to the military tank park and museum at Longue Pointe, Montreal.

== See also ==
- Military history of Canada
- History of the Canadian Army
- Canadian Forces
- Intelligence Branch (Canadian Forces)
- 2 Intelligence Company
- 7 Intelligence Company
- 3 Intelligence Company
- 6 Intelligence Company
