= John B. McDiarmid =

Canadian-born American classical philologist (1913–2002)

John Brodie McDiarmid (June 6, 1913 – April 15, 2002) was a Canadian-born academic who played an important role in Canadian Naval Intelligence during World War II. He was chairman of the Classics Department at the University of Washington, was the university's first Professor of Humanities, and was co-founder of the Seattle Chapter of the Archaeological Institute of America.

== Life and career ==
=== Early life and education ===
McDiarmid was born in Toronto, Ontario, the only child of Scottish immigrants. He graduated from Upper Canada College high school with the highest grades in his class, earning scholarships to the University of Toronto. McDiarmid took his B.A. in Greek and Latin at Victoria College, University of Toronto, in 1936, and graduated with honors, recipient of the Kerr's Cup. He paid his way through school teaching immigrants working on the Frontier Railroad how to speak and read English, and worked as a deckhand on a lake steamer. In 1940, he was awarded a Ph.D. in Greek, with additional two years studies in Sanskrit and Ancient Languages, from Johns Hopkins University, Phi Beta Kappa. While at Johns Hopkins he met and later married sculptor Mary Kahn, a graduate of Goucher College and Arts Students League.

=== Wartime experience ===
In 1942, during World War II, McDiarmid, joined the Royal Canadian Navy (RCN). After training in Halifax, Nova Scotia, he was appointed to Naval Services Headquarters in Ottawa and was assigned to the Operational Intelligence Center (OIC). He headed the RCN U-boat tracking team, charged with defending the North American Atlantic Coast against submarine attacks, and helped develop a system for interpreting and breaking German communication codes. He served under Lieutenant Commander Jean Maurice Barbe Pougnet (Jock) De Marbois, OBE, RD. In 1943, he served aboard HMS Hurricane, then, in London he became a member of the British Admiralty Tracking Room team for decryption procedures—part of the force working to break the code of Hitler's cipher device, the ENIGMA machine.

As a result of his work in the Admiralty's OIC, RCN researchers contacted him after the close of the war to gain information about the project. In 1982, in a letter to Vice Admiral Sir Peter Gretton, McDiarmid described the procedures of the until then top secret Admiralty Tracking room. "In the tracking room all signals containing or referring to Special Intelligence were decoded or encoded. No special intelligence ever left the room except to be burned and flushed down the head by an officer of the room; and no chart outside of the room showed more Special Intelligence than was revealed by our daily Secret and Top Secret signals. Admission to the room was severely restricted to those who had a need to know…" McDiarmid retired at the end World War II with the rank of Commander, RCVN.

=== University of Washington ===
McDiarmid returned to Johns Hopkins to a teaching position in the Classics Department, where he served from 1945 to 1949. In 1949, he accepted the position as the first chairman in the Classics Department at the University of Washington, in Seattle. He remained chairman of the Department until 1973. He was instrumental in the rapid growth of the department and in reorganizing its curriculum. He played a key role in the formation of the Classics Department graduate program. He was the first University of Washington Professor of Humanities in 1977–1978. He and provost Solomon Katz founded the Seattle chapter of the Archaeological Institute of America.

== Achievements and awards ==
McDiarmid's other honors and achievements include membership in the Institute for Advanced Study, Princeton, NJ, 1952–1953 (at same time as Albert Einstein) and 1957–1958, under the directorship of atomic-bomb physicist J. Robert Oppenheimer; and Guggenheim Fellow, 1957–1958. He was a founding member of the Intercollegiate Center for Classical Studies in Rome. As a scholar and an authority on ancient Greece, he wrote and published many articles on its literature and philosophers and was a popular lecturer on these subjects. The University of Washington's Classics Department lecture series, in which graduate students select the speakers, is called the John and Mary McDiarmid Lectureship. His wife, Mary Kahn McDiarmid, former president of Northwest Sculptors and president of Northwest Bonsai Society, died in 1988.

His study on Theophrastus was reviewed and improved by two renowned scholars Harold F. Cherniss and Eric A. Havelock (p. 133). Cherniss makes the strong suggestion that "further investigation must be made of the relationship of Theophrastus to Aristotle (p.87)". Several translations of Theophrastus by Fortenbaugh and others have appeared since McDiarmid's article. Havelock would go on to challenge the traditional views of Platonism which Cherniss maintained. Havelock wrote in his later works on Greek philosophy that he found Aristotle more reliable than Cherniss let on and the successive accounts by doxographers that McDiarmid states "each doxographer raises individual problems in addition to those that are due to the common dependence on Theophrastus' work" (ibid). It remains a valuable mid-century source and textual apparatus for present day scholarship in the field of Ancient philosophy, reprinted in 1970, and was cited as a source for understanding PreSocratic philosophers recently on the subject of rewriting the history of Ancient Greek philosophy. His study is also noted as raising the sceptical view regarding Theophrastus and Aristotle as reliable sources for the PreSocratics.

== Works ==
McDiarmid's published works include:

- "Theophrastus on the Eternity of the World". Transactions and Proceedings of the American Philological Association 71 (1940): 239–47.
- "Note on Heraclitus Fragment 124". American Journal of Philology 62 (October 1941): 492–94.
- "Euripides' Ion 1561". American Journal of Philology 68 (January 1947): 86–87.
- "Theophrastus on the Presocratic Causes." Harvard Studies in Classical Philology 61 (1953): 85–156.
- "Biographical Tradition of the Presocratics". In mimeograph to the membership of the Society for Ancient Greek Philosophy for their 1955 annual meeting, at which the paper was presented and discussed.
- "Phantom Words in Democritean Terminology". Hermes 86 (November 1958): 291–98.
- "Theophrastus, De Sensibus 66, Democritus' Explanation of Salimity". American Journal of Philology 80 (January 1959): 56-66..
- "Plato and Theophrastus' De Sensibus". Phronesis 4 (1959): 59–70.
- "Theophrastus De Sensibus 61–62: Democratus' Theory of Weight." Classical Philology 55 (January 1960): 28–30.
- "The Manuscript Tradition of Theophrastus' De Sensibus". Archiv für Geschichte der Philosophie 44, no. 1 (1962): 1–32.
- "Theophrastus on the Presocratic Causes". In Studies in Presocratic Philosophy, vol 1: The Beginnings of Philosophy, pp. 178–238. International Library of Philosophy and Scientific Method. London: Routledge & Kegan Paul. New York, The Humanities Press, 1970.
