= 6 Intelligence Company =

- 6^{e} Compagnie du renseignement (French)
- Active: 1993–present
- Country: Canada
- Branch: Canadian Army
- Role: Military intelligence
- Size: 3 platoons
- Part of: 3rd Canadian Division
- Garrison/HQ: Jefferson Armoury, Edmonton
- March: "Silver and Green" by Capt J.M. Gayfer
- Website: canada.ca/en/army/corporate/3-canadian-division/6-intelligence-company.html

6 Intelligence Company (6 Int Coy; French: 6^{e} Compagnie du renseignement) is a military intelligence unit of the Canadian Army. It is a line unit that falls directly under 3rd Canadian Division command, which is headquartered in Edmonton. The company is divided into three platoons, which are in Vancouver, Winnipeg, and Edmonton, with a detachment in Calgary. The members of the unit are recruited from other military trades as well as from various civilian organizations. The intelligence operators and intelligence officers of the unit train regularly to support domestic and foreign missions at the tactical, operational, and strategic levels.

== Lineage ==
The unit history dates to August 30, 1950, when No. 4 Intelligence Training Company was formed in Vancouver (though the formation of the unit was announced by Army headquarters February 27, 1950). On July 15, 1956, the minister of national defence, Ralph Campney, approved the relocation of a detachment to Edmonton. Two years later Western Command proposed that the detachment in Edmonton should form a new company; however the chief of the general staff rejected the proposal at the time. On February 7, 1962, the detachment was formally designated No. 6 Intelligence Training Company, and Captain John Singer was appointed the first commanding officer.

== See also ==
- Military history of Canada
- History of the Canadian Army
- Canadian Forces
- Intelligence Branch (Canadian Forces)
- 2 Intelligence Company
- 3 Intelligence Company
- 4 Intelligence Company
