= 7 Intelligence Company =

- Active: 1993-Present
- Country: Canada
- Branch: Canadian Army
- Role: Combat Intelligence
- Part of: Intelligence Branch
- Garrison/HQ: Ottawa
- March: Silver and Green by Capt J.M. Gayfer

7 Intelligence Company (abbreviated 7 Int Coy) is a Canadian Forces Primary Reserve Intelligence Branch unit based in Ottawa. It is part of the Canadian Army Intelligence Regiment. The Intelligence Officers and Operators of the unit reside in the National Capital Region. They deploy on domestic and foreign operations, and are primarily responsible for tactical, or combat intelligence.

== History ==
Ottawa's reserve intelligence unit, originally named 2 Intelligence Platoon, was established 18 February 1993 by the Treasury Board as a support unit for the Special Service Force, in Canadian Forces Base Petawawa. The unit was transferred to 1st Canadian Division in 1994 and then to 4th Canadian Division (then called Land Force Central Area) on 8 April 1995.

The unit was officially renamed 7 Intelligence Company on 18 July 2013. In April, 2017, the company became a reserve subunit within the Canadian Army Intelligence Regiment, and as part of that unit transferred to 5th Canadian Division, within the 6 Canadian Combat Support Brigade (6 CCSB), in October of the same year.

Unit members have provided support to operations domestically during the Red River floods of 1997, the Ontario-Quebec ice storm of 1998, and the 2018 British Columbia forest fire. They have also deployed on overseas operations in Afghanistan and the former Yugoslavia, among others.

== Treatment of Casey Brunelle ==
In 2013 Casey Brunelle testified in a sexual harassment investigation involving two other soldiers and allegedly faced reprisals from his unit. In 2017 a civilian committee found that there had been false accusations made against Brunelle. His negative performance review and potential loss of security clearance were unjustified, according to the committee. In 2019 then-Chief of the Defence Staff Jonathan Vance responded to the case siding for the most part with the military.
