= Combat Training Centre =

- Centre d'instruction au combat (French)
- The badge of the Combat Training Centre
- Active: 1965–present
- Country: Canada
- Branch: Canadian Army
- Type: Combat training
- Part of: Canadian Army Doctrine and Training Centre
- Garrison/HQ: Oromocto, New Brunswick
- Website: canada.ca/en/army/corporate/canadian-army-doctrine-and-training-centre/combat-training-centre.html

Commanders
- Commander Combat Training Centre: Colonel B.J. Honig, CD

The Combat Training Centre (French: Centre d'instruction au combat) is responsible for the individual training of Canadian Army soldiers and officers in military occupational classifications that are controlled by the Canadian Army. The centre is headquartered at the 5th Canadian Division Support Base Gagetown, New Brunswick, and maintains schools at CFB Kingston, 8 Wing Trenton and CFB Borden in Ontario. It is a formation of the Canadian Army Doctrine and Training Centre, the former Land Force Doctrine and Training System which was renamed as part of the reorganization of the Canadian Army on 18 July 2013.

== History ==
The modern CTC traces its history to when the Royal Canadian Infantry School and the Royal Canadian Armoured School were merged to form the Combat Arms School (CAS) at CFB Borden on 24 November 1966. The CAS and the Canadian Forces School of Artillery were amalgamated and moved to CFB Gagetown in September 1970. On 4 September 1992, the CTC was allocated to the newly created Land Force Atlantic Area. It was subsequently transferred to the Land Force Doctrine and Training System when that formation was created in 2000.

== Mission ==
The mission of the Combat Training Centre is to train Canadian Army officers and soldiers.

== Structure ==
The Combat Training Centre is made up of the following schools:

The Royal Canadian Armoured Corps School (RCACS). RCACS delivers individual training to Regular and Reserve Force soldiers and officers of the Royal Canadian Armoured Corps. The RCACS provides training in driving, maintenance, gunnery, tank and reconnaissance tactics.

The Royal Regiment of Canadian Artillery School (RCAS). RCAS delivers individual training to Regular and Reserve Force soldiers and officers of the Royal Regiment of Canadian Artillery. Training includes instruction in how to fire and manoeuvre artillery, how to observe and control artillery fire and how to deliver weapons by fixed-wing aircraft, helicopter and unmanned aerial vehicle.

The Royal Canadian School of Infantry (RCS of I). The RCS of I trains Regular and Reserve Force officers and soldiers of the Royal Canadian Infantry Corps in infantry skills, including leadership, navigation, close combat, weapons, reconnaissance and sniping. The RCS of I also provides leadership and soldier skills training to all Canadian Army officers on the Basic Military Officer Qualification - Army (BMOQ-A) Course, formerly known as Common Army Phase (CAP).

The Canadian Forces School of Military Engineering (CFSME). CFSME trains engineering officers and soldiers of the Canadian Army and Royal Canadian Air Force. The mission of the Engineers is to assist friendly troops to survive, move and operate while denying the same to the enemy.

The Canadian Forces School of Communications and Electronics, CFB Kingston, Ontario. CFSCE is the Canadian Forces' Network Operations Centre of Excellence, which trains Army and Air Force personnel to conduct the spectrum of network operations. Officers and soldiers are trained at CFSCE to provide friendly troops with the ability to communicate and transfer data at all operational levels and to defend military networks from interference by an adversary.

The Royal Canadian Electrical and Mechanical Engineers School (RCEMES), CFB Borden. RCEMES trains both officers and craftsmen of the Royal Canadian Electrical and Mechanical Engineers to maintain, repair and sustain Army equipment ranging from small arms to main battle tanks.

The Tactics School. Tactics School advocates the training and education of Army and other CF personnel by providing formal courses, learning support and Counter-Improvised Explosive Devices and other centre-of-excellence expertise. The Tactics School is focused on developing the Army's future leaders primarily for the combat team level.

The Canadian Army Advanced Warfare Centre (CAAWC), 8 Wing Trenton, Ontario. CAAWC trains Army personnel in the skills required to conduct operations in a variety of challenging environments such as mountains, jungles, deserts and the Arctic. It is also the home of basic and advanced parachute training and parachute maintenance for the Canadian Forces.

The Canadian Army Trials and Evaluations Unit conducts impartial trials and evaluations of new or modified equipment to ensure that soldiers' concerns and recommendations are represented.

The Army Learning Support Centre integrates emerging technologies and learning methods into training, including distance learning, 3D modelling, gaming, animation and virtual reality; while significantly reducing the costs required for training with improved success rates across the board.

== See also ==
- History of the Canadian Army
- Canadian Armed Forces
- Canadian Forces School of Military Engineering
