= Royal Canadian Armoured Corps School =

Military education and training school in New Brunswick, Canada

- École du Corps blindé royal canadien (French)
- Active: 13 August 1940 – present
- Country: Canada
- Branch: Canadian Army
- Type: Armoured
- Role: Military training establishment
- Size: Three training squadrons and Regimental Headquarters
- Part of: Combat Training Centre
- Garrison/HQ: 5th Canadian Division Support Base Gagetown
- Motto: Disciplina ante augmentationem (Latin for 'training before growth')
- Colors: Red and yellow
- March: "My Boy Willie"

Commanders
- Notable commanders: F. F. Worthington, Sydney Valpy Radley-Walters

The Royal Canadian Armoured Corps School (French: École du Corps blindé royal canadien) is part of the Combat Training Centre at 5th Canadian Division Support Base Gagetown, New Brunswick, and is responsible for the tactical and technical training for armoured non-commissioned members and officers, in addition to maintaining certain specialized qualifications on behalf of the Canadian Army. Non-commissioned members and officers alike are trained on the Leopard 2, Textron Tactical Armoured Patrol Vehicle, Coyote Reconnaissance Vehicle, and LAV VI armoured fighting vehicles.

== Officer training ==
Regular Force officer training used to be divided into two phases: Armour Troop Leader 1.1 (ATL 1.1) and Armour Troop Leader 1.2 (ATL 1.2). In ATL 1.1, students were taught about commanding a crew of a single vehicle on the Leopard 2 MBT. ATL 1.2 trained students as armoured reconnaissance troop leaders, using the LAV 6 and Textron Tactical Armoured Patrol Vehicle.

ATL was unified into a single course in May 2022, running 14 weeks long (plus gunnery in the shape of 5 weeks for Regular force and 3 weeks for Reserve force officers)
