= Tanks of Canada =

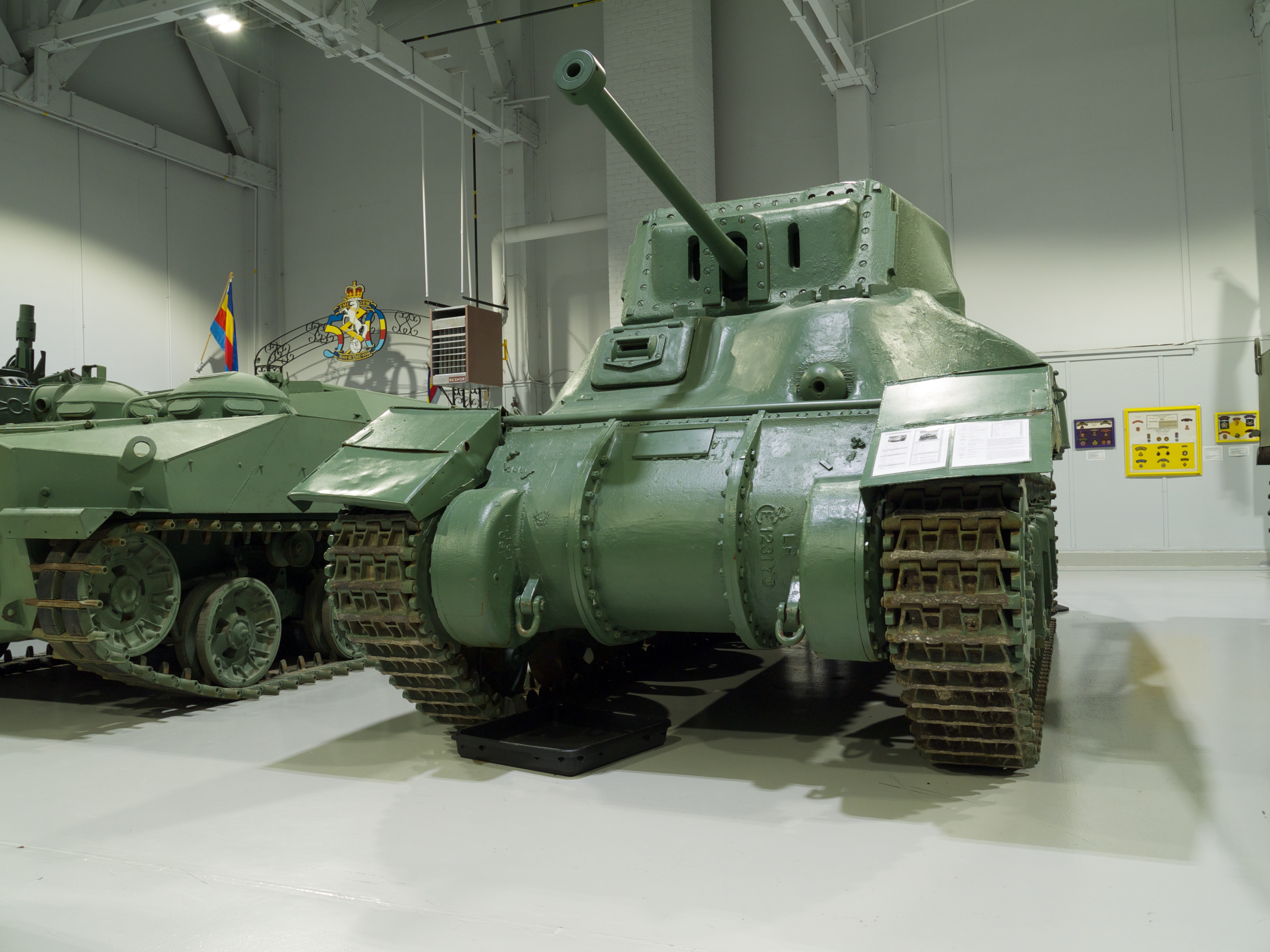
Ram Mk.II – late production

The history and development of tanks in the Royal Canadian Armoured Corps can be broken down into smaller categories: their origin during World War I; the interwar period; World War II; the Cold War; and the modern era.

== Overview ==
Originally formed as the Canadian Cavalry Corps in 1910, Canada's first tank units were not raised until late in 1918. Initially, these units were considered to be part of the Machine Gun Corps and the 1st Canadian Tank Battalion; 2nd Canadian Tank Battalion and the 3e Bataillon de chars d'assaut were all too late to join the fighting in the First World War. However, the 1st Canadian Tank Battalion was still training in Mark V tanks in the U.K. when the Canadian Tank Corps was finally authorized two days after the armistice.

The first tanks since the First World War did not arrive until a few Vickers Mark VI light tanks appeared the year before Canada went to war with Germany again. From these modest beginnings, the modern Canadian Armoured Corps began on 13 August 1940. Initially, the Canadian Armoured forces brokered a deal to obtain scrap iron on behalf of the Canadian Government because isolationist laws prohibited the U.S. from foreign arm sales. At the time, there were no tanks available to be acquired from Britain. Therefore, 219 US M1917 tanks, a First World War design, were obtained at scrap prices. They were sufficient to begin some tank training and familiarisation, but were of very limited combat use. Events of the Second World War later thrust Canada into large scale tank production with thousands of Valentine, Ram, and Grizzly tanks and their armoured variants being produced.

Canada would also go on to build modern armoured fighting vehicles that served during the Cold War and the War in Afghanistan.

== Canadian tanks ==
=== Valentine tank ===
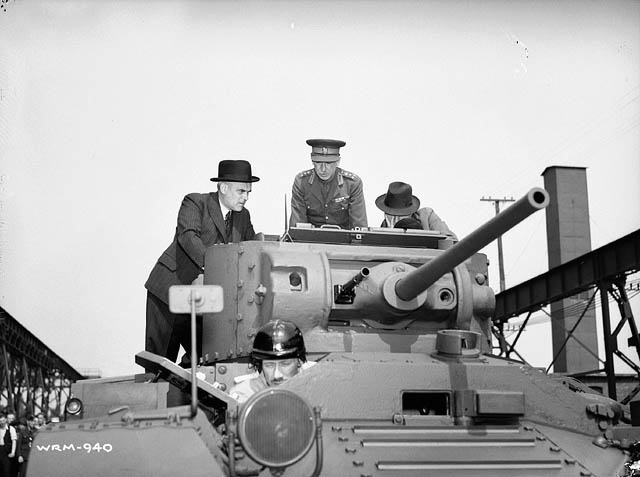
The first tank to be manufactured in Canada, a Valentine VI, being inspected by C D Howe the Canadian Minister of Munitions and Supply in May 1941

After the fall of France, it was decided the nascent Canadian armoured divisions would be equipped by tanks produced in Canada. To form the 1st Army Tank Brigade, Valentine tanks were ordered. This British design was to be built in Canada. Aside from the necessary adjustments to the design to incorporate local engineering standards and available components, the Canadian Valentines used a GMC engine. This engine, being an improvement over the original, was later applied to British production. Even before the loss of the majority of the United Kingdom's tank force in France in 1940 after Dunkirk, it was recognised that tank production in the UK at the start of the war was insufficient and capacity in the US was taken for British needs. So it was necessary that if Canada was to equip with tanks they would have to be manufactured locally. In June 1940 the Canadian Pacific Railway's Angus Shops in Montreal, as the only large firm with spare capacity, had received a contract to produce 300 partially fitted out Valentine tanks for the British; this was followed later with one for 488 complete tanks for Canada. However, the Valentine was an infantry tank and Canada required a cruiser tank for its recently formed armoured division. In the end 1,940 Valentines were produced by CPR most of which were supplied to the USSR. Although the Valentine used a number of American produced parts, its reliance on British components, difficulties in adapting its manufacture to North American methods, and other problems such as limitations to the availability of the right type of armour plate affected Valentine production. In practice, Canada never used most of the 1,400 Valentines they built as they were supplied under lend-lease to the Soviet Union.

=== Ram tank ===
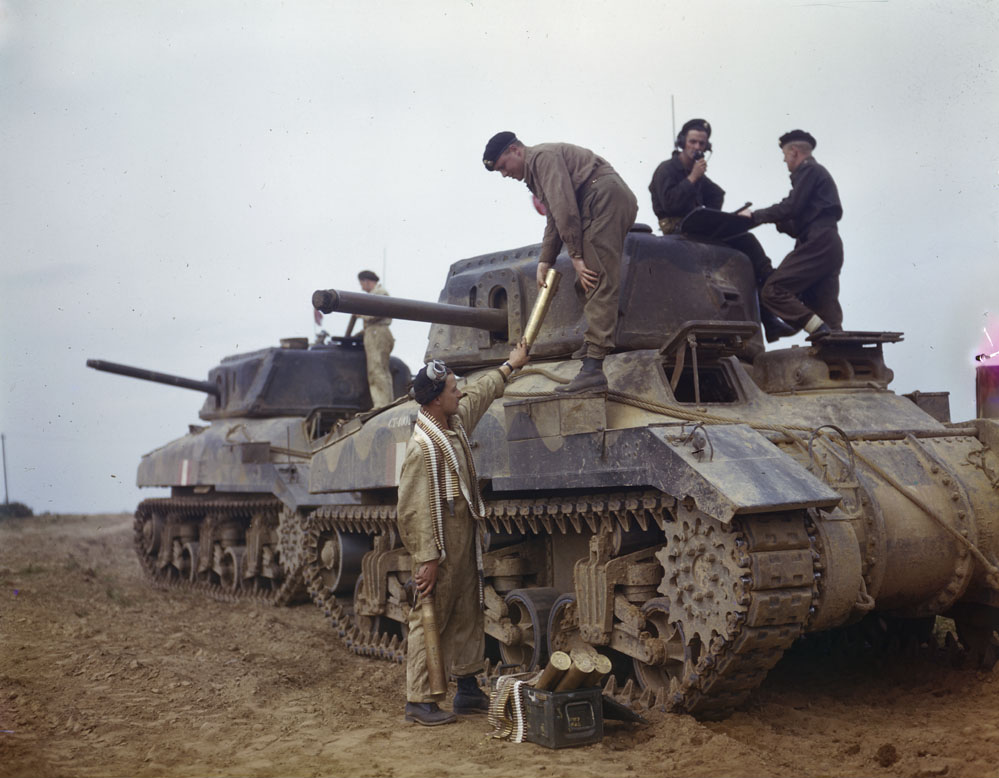
Ram Mk.II (early production) tanks during the war

The Canadian Joint Committee on Tank Development concluded in September 1940 that its cruiser tank should be based on a US rather than a British design. This would be quicker and allow it to use components already in production for the US design. In early 1941 the 1st Tank Brigade was sent to Britain and equipped with the Matilda infantry tank. For the formation of two armoured divisions it was expected that 1,200 cavalry tanks were needed. The United Kingdom was not in a position to supply them, as it had shortfalls in supply for its own needs. This meant that Canada had to develop its own production. To this end a tank arsenal was set up under the management of a subsidiary of a US firm engaged in tank production. This Canadian indigenous tank design would become the standard armoured vehicle for the Canadian army. The result was the Ram cruiser tank, based on the chassis and running gear of the US M3 Lee; Rams were produced by the Montreal Locomotive Works (MLW) from 1941 to 1943.

Except for the Badger flame thrower tank conversion of the Ram tank and other variants that were in action in NW Europe, the Ram tank did not go to war with the Canadian Armoured Divisions. The decision was made to use the new Sherman tank as standard equipment. The Ram's main contribution to the war effort was to fully equip large armoured units formed in Canada and the U.K. with a modern tank it could use to conduct essential tactical training prior to the invasions in Italy and Normandy. The Ram was produced in numerous variants, the most notable being the Kangaroo Armoured Personnel Carrier.

==== Variants of the Ram tank ====
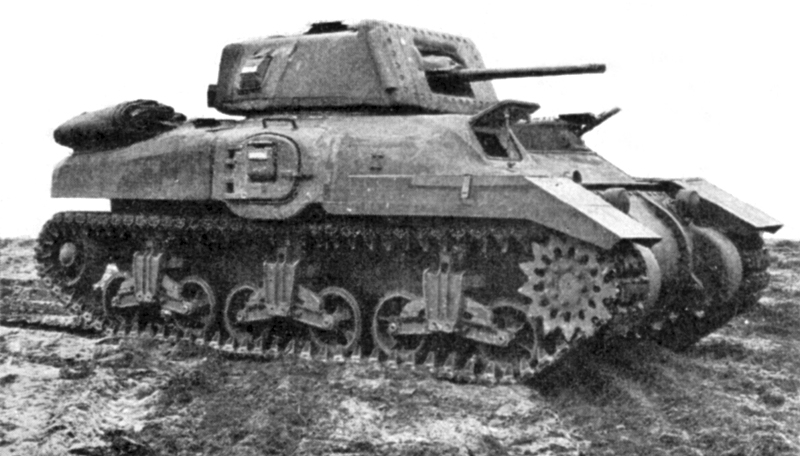
Ram Mk I

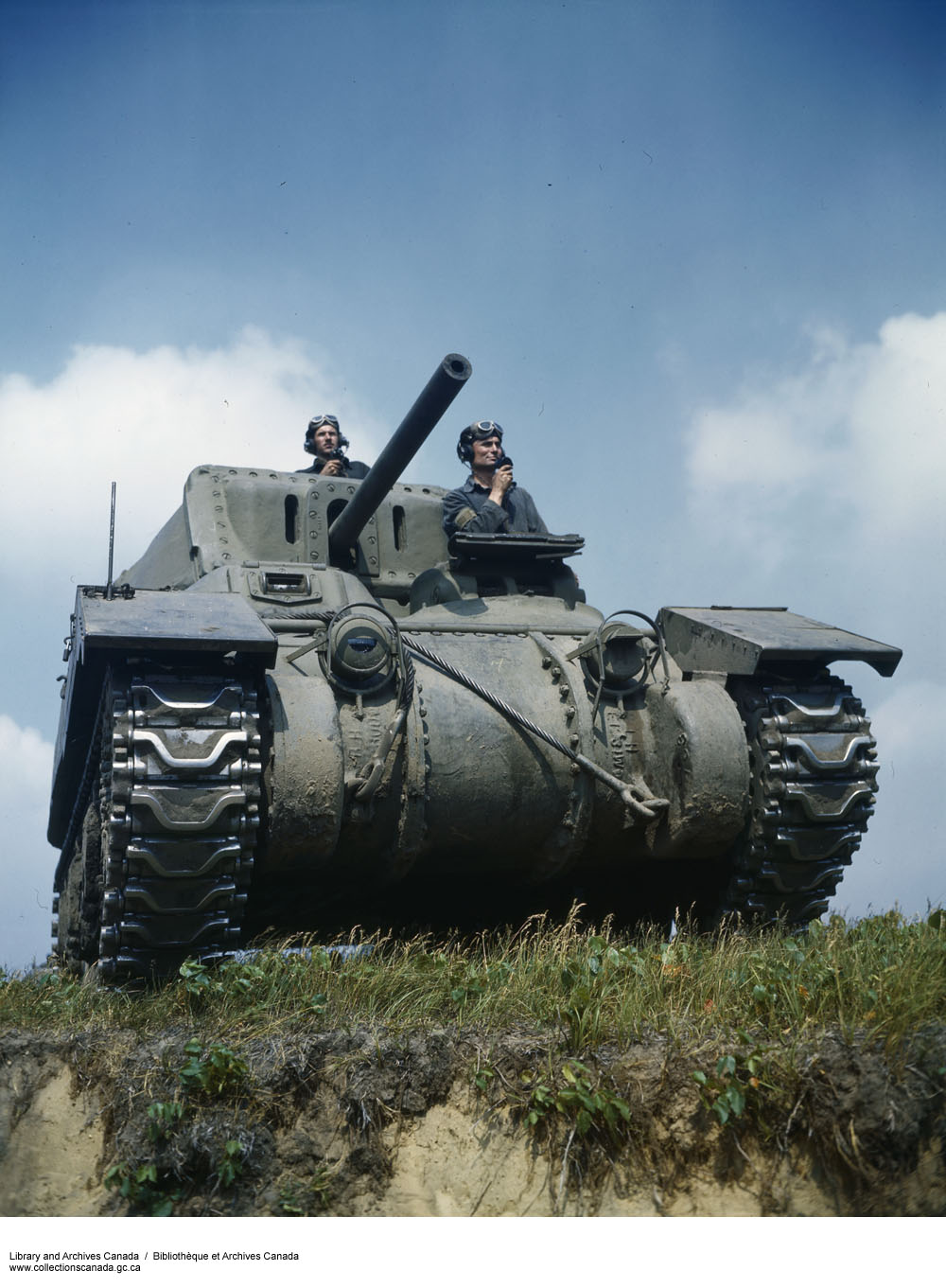
Ram Mk II – early production

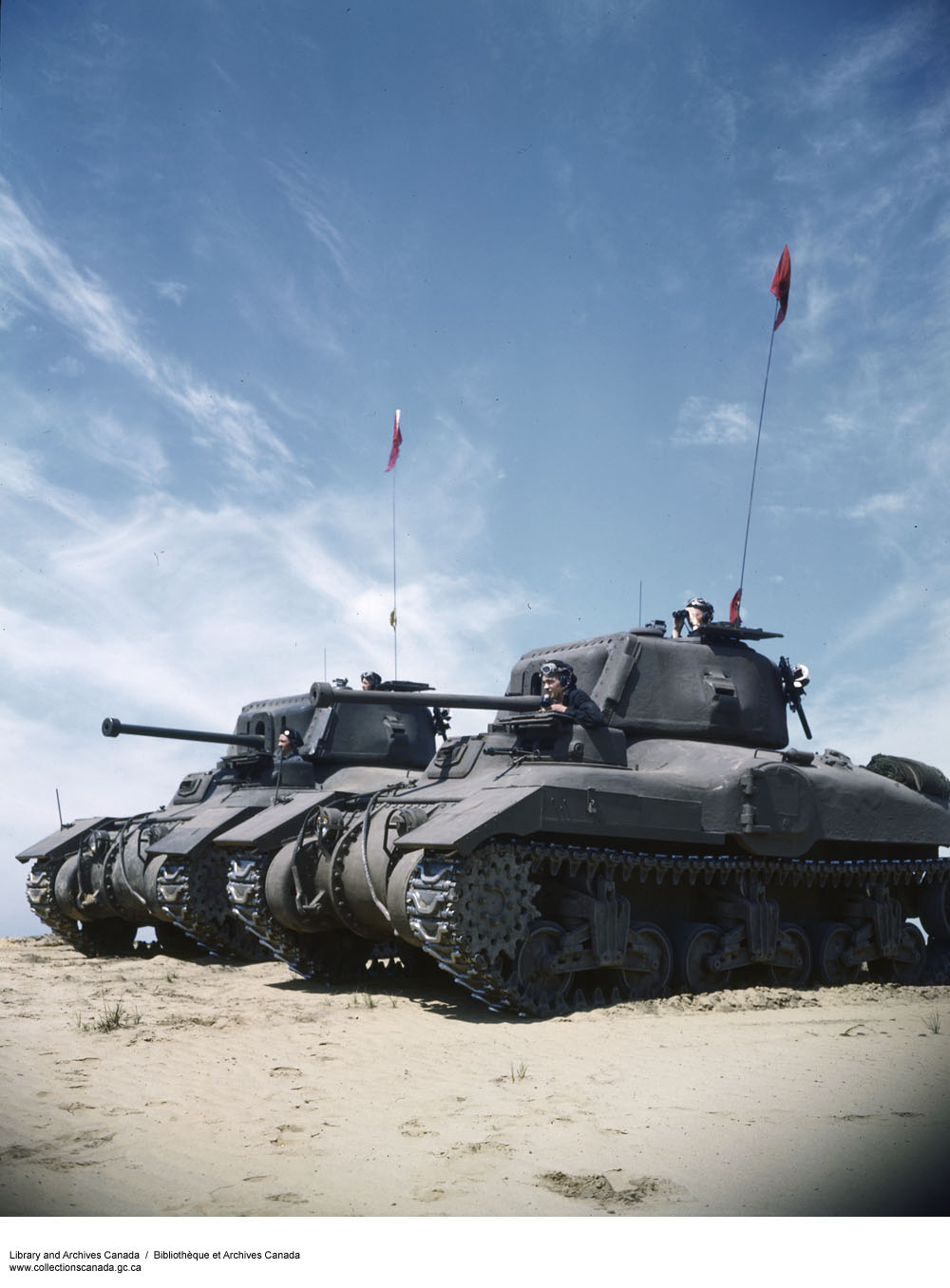
Ram Mk II – later production, with Mk V QF 6 pounder but still with auxiliary turret

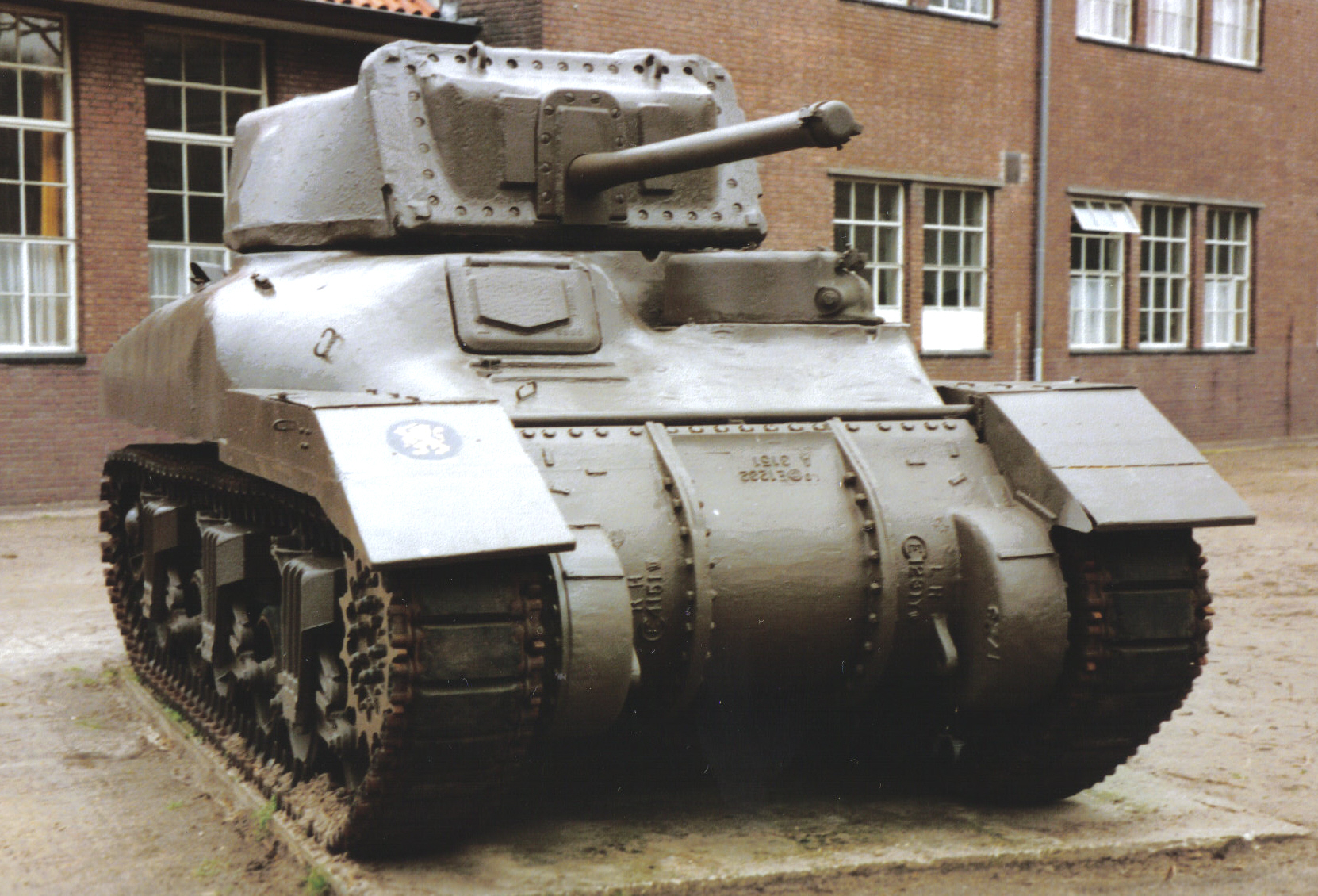
Ram OP/Command tank at Amersfoort

- Tank cruiser, Ram Mk I: Ordnance QF 2 pounder / 40mm gun (171 rounds).
- Tank cruiser, Ram Mk II
  - Early production: Mk III QF 6 pounder (57 mm) gun with 92 rounds.
  - Late production: Mk V six-pounder. Auxiliary turret and sponson door removed. Browning .303 in (7.7 mm) machine gun fitted in ball mount.
- Badger: A flamethrower equipped tank. The first Badgers were Ram Kangaroos with the Wasp II flamethrowing equipment (as used on the Universal Carrier) installed in place of the bow MG. Later models were turreted Rams with the equipment in place of the main gun.
- Ram Kangaroo: Ram with turret removed to give an armoured personnel carrier capable of carrying 11 battle-ready troops as well as the two crew.
- Ram OP/Command (84): An armoured vehicle to function as a mobile observation posts for the Forward Observation Officers (FOO) of Sexton self-propelled gun units, based on Ram Mk II. The gun was replaced by a dummy, and two Wireless Set No. 19 radios were fitted with a No. 58 set. Crew of six. They were built from the last 84 Rams off the production line in 1943.
- Ram GPO: Like OP but with special equipment for "Gun Position Officers" of self-propelled artillery regiments. Had Tannoy loudspeakers mounted.
- Sexton "25-pdr, SP, Tracked": Self-propelled artillery vehicle armed with QF 25 pounder gun in open-topped superstructure.
- Ram Ammunition Carrier: Also called "Wallaby", an armoured ammunition supply vehicle, converted as for the Kangaroo but used to carry 25-pdr ammunition for Sexton.
- Ram ARV Mk I: Armoured recovery vehicle created by adding winch gear added to Ram Mark I .
- Ram ARV Mk II: ARV based on Ram Mk II. Jibs and earth spade added, turret replaced by dummy.

=== Grizzly ===
Grizzly tank with a Sexton behind

The M3 was succeeded by the superior M4 Sherman. The Allies agreed to standardise on the M4, and MLW began producing the Canadian version, the Grizzly tanks in August 1943. The Grizzly's suspension used 17-tooth drive sprockets and CDP tracks. In comparison, the M4 used 13 tooth drive sprockets. The CDP track was lighter and simpler than the standard US tracks and did not require rubber, which was scarce since the Japanese advance into Southeast Asia. The Canadian Grizzly tank production halted when it became apparent US production would be sufficient. Instead, MLW produced the Sexton self-propelled gun Mk II. The Sexton Mk II used the Grizzly chassis, with the upper hull modified to carry the Commonwealth standard QF 25 pounder gun. The Sexton was the Commonwealth counterpart to the US M7 Priest. A small batch of Grizzly medium tank was fitted with an Ordnance QF 17-pounder for training but none saw action.

=== Cougar ===
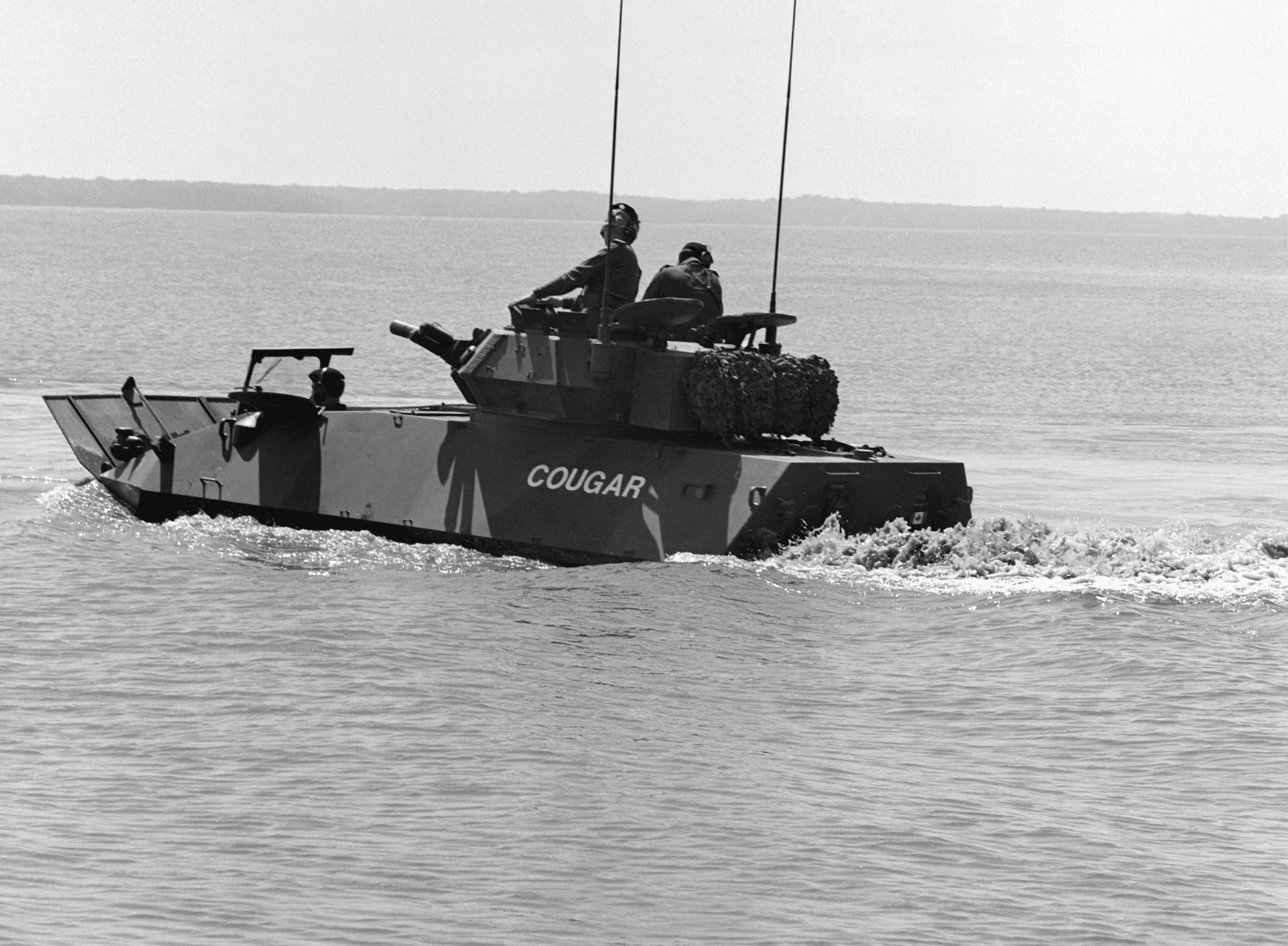
Cougar swimming

Starting with the introduction of the U.S.-designed and built Sherman tank, Canada began a tradition of acquiring U.S., British and then later German made armour to equip the Canadian Army. Often there were revisions to the original specification driven by Canadian requirements. It wasn't until the late 1970s that an armoured vehicle was fielded by Canadian Armoured Regiments that was developed and built in Canada. Although not a Main Battle Tank, the Cougar AVGP - manufactured at GM Diesel Division in London, ON (now part of General Dynamics Land Systems) was envisioned. The AVGP was the first Canadian built AFV in service since the Second World War. The amphibious Cougar was a direct Fire Support Vehicle (Wheeled) FSV(W) variant of the AVGP (Armoured Vehicle General Purpose). It was based on the Swiss MOWAG 6X6 Piranha hull with a 76 mm main gun mounted in a British FV101 Scorpion Tank turret. Cougars entered service in the late 1970s in Canadian based regular and reserve Armoured Regiments. They were intended as a quick air transportable fighting vehicles and used by the CAST Brigade for service in Norway and later with the 1st Canadian Division committed to NATO's CENTAG. They were too light to be effective against MBTs however the end of the Cold War meant they were used in stability operations in Bosnia and Somalia and relegated to training the tank crews in Canada that later received Leopard C1 tanks from the Canadian Forces in Germany that returned in 1994.

=== Coyote ===
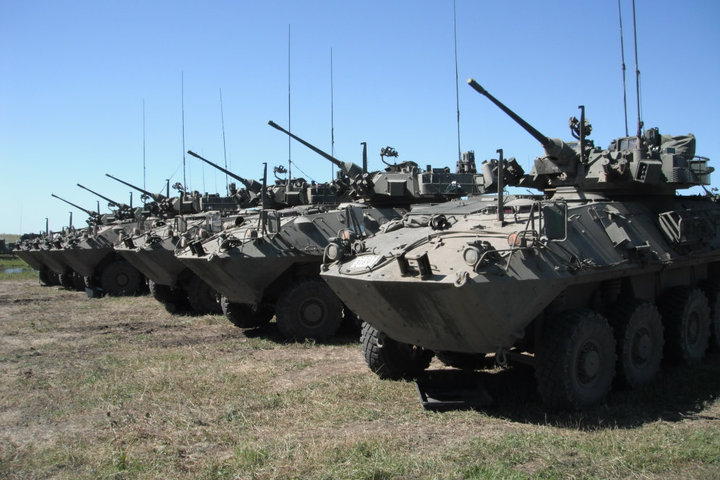
Coyote from the 12^{e} Régiment blindé du Canada

The experience gained by the Cougar and AVGP program evolved into the highly successful, made in Canada, LAV-25 and LAV III armoured vehicles that have been deployed by armies around the world. The Coyote Armoured Reconnaissance Vehicle is a Canadian produced eight-wheeled armoured reconnaissance vehicle based on and upgraded version of the LAV-25. 203 of them entered Canadian service by 1996.

=== Plan to transition to the armoured combat vehicle ===
As originally conceived in the early 1990s, the armoured combat vehicle (ACV) was intended to replace the AVGP Cougar for the types of missions that it had been called upon to carry out in operations other than war (OOTW) in Somalia and Bosnia. Such a purchase was seen as part of a two-tier equipping strategy – the wheeled 105 mm-armed ACV and some other lighter-weight equipment for OOTW and a main battle tank (MBT) and related heavier equipment for warfighting.

However, by the mid-1990s elements of the Canadian army were envisioning the ACV replacing both the AVGP Cougar and Canada's obsolescent Leopard 1 MBTs as part of a move to a medium-weight wheeled army. In 2003, Canada announced that it would replace its Leopard 1s with lightweight M1128 mobile gun systems. This decision was made although the MGS met neither some of the key capabilities sought in the conceptual Canadian ACV nor the futuristic, high technology (and still-not achieved) requirements for a future ACV that had been highlighted only the year before by the Commander of the Canadian Army to a Canadian Parliamentary committee.

Canadian research-wargaming-based operational research studies and other professional public commentators all argued against this move. The biggest concerns were that the ACV's planned weak armour and firepower meant that it could not manoeuvre in the presence of a modern enemy and that it could only use ambush tactics against modern MBTs and AFVs, becoming in effect a death trap if it tried, at all, to fulfil the MBT role. Operational research also looked at the benefits of giving the ACV a through-the-barrel (TBM) as well as the equivalent of 400mm of additional armour. The research found that such improvements gave the ACV MBT-like firepower but still left it unable to manoeuvre in the presence of a capable enemy.

Operational research also highlighted an additional, unintended consequence of removing MBTs from the Canadian army. Their loss would also remove the tank-based armoured engineering vehicles and bridgelayers as well as the MBT-mounted mine rollers, mine ploughs, and dozer blades which were all needed to deal with enemy obstacles under fire. The study recommended that none of the envisioned LAV-based armoured engineer vehicles should be procured, as they were inferior to the Leopard tank-based engineering vehicles then in service.

=== Leopard II ===
Conventional fighting against the Taliban by the Canadian Army in the Panwayi district of Afghanistan in September 2006 led to a rethinking of the ACV plan. A squadron of Leopard 1s was rushed out to Kandahar Province in Afghanistan and arrangements were made for the army to borrow modern Leopard 2 MBTs from Germany for deployment to Kandahar until Canada could buy used Netherlands' Leopard 2s to replace its Leopard 1s. In 2007, Canada abandoned its plan to buy the Mobile Gun System. In the context of the Russo-Ukrainian War, by 24 February 2023 Canada had announced that it would provide Ukraine with eight Leopard II tanks and a Leopard II-based Armoured Recovery Vehicle.

== List of tanks in the Canadian Army ==
| Vehicle | Role |
|---|---|
| Mark V tank | WWI ended while the 1st Canadian Tank Battalion was still training in Mark V tanks in the U.K. Shortly after the war ended, the tanks were returned to the British. |
| Carden Loyd tankette | Twelve used by Canadian Armoured Fighting Vehicle School in a training role from 1931. |
| Vickers Light Tank Mk VI | Twelve of these pre-WWII machine gun equipped light tanks were delivered in 1938. Some were retained for driver training in Canada in the early years of WWII. |
| M1917 | Acquired by Canada on an emergency basis early in WWII from United States. Used as a tank trainer in Canada. |
| Valentine tank | First Canadian-built tank. Most sent to the Soviet Union under Lend Lease, while a small number were remained in Canada for training crews. |
| Matilda tank | Acquired in small numbers from British stocks to train crews in the U.K. prior to the arrival of the Ram Tank from Canada. Did not see action with the RCAC. |
| M3 Lee | Acquired in small numbers from British secondary stocks to train crews in the U.K. prior to the arrival of the Ram Tank from Canada. Did not see action with the RCAC. |
| Ram tank | Canadian indigenous tank design based on components from the M3. Superseded by the Sherman tank as standard equipment in the RCAC. The Ram's main contribution was to give armoured units in Canada and the U.K. a modern tank to conduct essential tactical training and build organizational knowledge prior to re-equipping with Sherman tanks for the invasions in Italy and Normandy. Ram tanks without their turrets known as Kangaroos were operated by the 1st Canadian Armoured Carrier Regiment, formed from RCAC personnel overseas, and provided lifesaving battlefield mobility to Canadian and British infantry. Variants like the Badger did see action as a flame thrower tank in NW Europe, and former gun tanks as Command tanks. |
| Churchill tank | Issued to Canadian Tank brigades which saw action at Dieppe, Italy, Normandy and NW Europe. |
| M3 & M5 Stuart | Used as a Reconnaissance tank throughout the WWII campaigns with and without the 37mm gun turret. The earlier M3 was mostly used as a training tank while in England. The improved Stuart tank (known as the M5 Stuart), and some turretless recce versions, were widely used. Also used as a training tank with reserve units for more than a decade after the war. |
| Grizzly I cruiser | Canadian-built M4A1 Sherman tank variant. Production in Canada was halted when U.S. factories overwhelmingly began producing enough Sherman tanks for the U.S. and its allies. Grizzlies remained in Canada for crew training, and postwar were shipped to Portugal as military aid. |
| Sherman M4A2 tank | U.S.-built, issued on a very large scale. The M4A2 was the standard medium tank in the Canadian Army during WWII, replacing the Ram tank, and known by its British designation as the Sherman III. Postwar, limited numbers remained in Army Reserve service and were used for training during until replaced by the Canadian version of the M4A3E8. Examples of the 105mm Sherman were trialed late in the war, but did not arrive as standard issue, they still used some. |
| Sherman Firefly | The Sherman VC was issued starting before the Normandy invasions as additional firepower to defeat German Tiger and Panther tanks. Based on the US M4 30-cylinder multi-bank engine Sherman V and converted in Britain with the powerful 3-inch (76.2 mm) calibre British QF 17-pounder anti-tank gun as its main weapon, among other changes. They also used the standard 75mm, M4A4 (Sherman V) version of the tank as an upgrade to their Sherman III models. |
| M10 tank destroyer | An American-made turreted tank destroyer initially armed with the 3-inch Gun M7 and modified to the standard British 17-pounder anti-tank gun. Its angular welded steel hull used many components of the M4A2. The M10 was issued to Canadian anti-tank units in NW Europe. |
| 17pdr SP Achilles | More commonly known today as the M10 Achilles, was a modification of the M10 GMC. The turret was modified to accommodate the more powerful and larger 17pdr (76.2mm) gun over the original 3-inch Gun M7 fitted to the M10 GMC. Of the 1,600 M10 GMC's given to Britain, about 1,000 were modified into the Achilles. |
| Staghound Armoured Car | Although the Canadian Army issued smaller scout cars and light armoured cars equipped with machine guns and cannons, the Staghound Armoured car with a turret mounted 37 mm main gun was the only heavy armoured car employed by RCAC Armoured Car and Reconnaissance regiments in the NW Europe campaign. The Staghound's were deployed for flank security, protecting lines of communication and in the screening force where they sometimes fought in the recce role. Some Staghounds remained in Army Reserve service and were used for training during the post war years. |
| Sherman M4A2E8 & M4A3E8 tank M4A2(76) W HVSS | 294 M4A2E8 tanks were purchased by the Canadian government in 1946 and another 20 M4A3E8 tanks acquired from US stocks already in Korea for Korean War service in 1951. Offered to Canada by the US from its arsenals, the tanks had been delivered too late for shipment as Lend Lease to Russia. The E8 tank was the last of the design continuum which had started frantically early in WW2. It featured the long barrelled 76 mm High Velocity gun, a further refined hull fitted with HVSS Horizontal volute spring suspension giving a much better ride, and a large turret with two crew hatches. Canadians fought these tanks with distinction in the Korean War. Afterwards they were replaced by the Centurion Mk.3 tank in the Regular Force. Most were returned to stores in the early 1960s, but some lasted into the early 1970s. |
| M24 Chaffee light tank | Thirty-two were ordered in 1947 for recce duties. |
| Centurion tank | Canada initially ordered 274 Mk. 3 tanks equipped with the 20-pounder main gun, nine Armoured Recovery Vehicles and four Bridge-layers. Acquired for NATO use, most served with 4 CMBG in Germany and the remainder served in Canada. Additional orders for the Mk. 5. These were updated to Mk.6 with the NATO standard 105 mm gun. The Mk. 6 and Mk. 11's, a further updated Mk. 6, were deployed as combat tanks, and the earlier Mk. 3 and Mk. 5s were retained as trainers. From 1969 to 1970 the Canadian Army lists 77 tanks in Germany (mostly Mk 5 and Mk 11's). The remainder in Canada (60 at CFB Wainwright AB, 59 at CFSD Longpointe PQ, 46 at CFB Gagetown NB, 30 at CFB Borden, 29 at CFB Meaford ON, 27 at CFB Calgary AB, 12 at CFB Petawawa ON, 6 at RCEME School Kingston ON and 1 at the LETE Test Establishment Orleans, CFB Ottawa ON) for a total of 347 Tanks, including 120 Mk. 5's, three Mk. 5 Recovery tanks and some Mk. 11's fitted with IR and coaxial ranging guns. Replaced by Leopard C1 MBT, and to a limited extent AVGP Cougars which were intended as a cost saving measure to replace the Centurions that had been used for the training role in Canada. Many of the tanks were sold to Israel which converted them to diesel engines. Some of these hulls are still in use in the IDF as variants. Overall, the Canadian Centurion tanks served for 25 years, from January 1952 to January 1977 when they were replaced by Leopard 1. |
| Ferret armoured car | The small and agile Ferret armoured car was operated by Canadian Armoured Recce units from 1954 to 1981. Canada ordered 124 Mk. 1's but some Mk. 2's were also acquired from BAOR stocks in Germany. The distinctive machine gun turret of the Mk. 2 was removed for Canadian service. The Ferrets were replaced by the Lynx. |
| Lynx reconnaissance vehicle | The Canadian Forces accepted 174 vehicles from 1968, supplementing and finally replacing the Ferret. Typically Lynxes were issued to Regular Force armoured regiment's reconnaissance squadrons (D Sqn) with three troops of seven Lynxes, organized into three two-vehicle patrols plus the troop leader's vehicle, and headquarters. Elsewhere in the brigade, nine Lynxes were used in each reconnaissance platoon of infantry battalion's combat support company. The commander operated a M2HB from the M26 manually traversed heavy machine gun cupola from inside the vehicle. The rear-facing observer operated the radio and fires the pintle-mounted 7.62mm machine gun. Well-liked but worn out, by 1993 they were withdrawn from service and replaced by the Coyote. |
| Cougar AVGP | Manufactured at GM Diesel Division in London, ON, now part of General Dynamics Land Systems, the AVGP was the first Canadian built AFV in Canadian service since the Second World War. The amphibious Cougar was a direct Fire Support Vehicle (Wheeled) FSV(W) variant of the Armoured Vehicle General Purpose. It was based on the Swiss MOWAG 6X6 Piranha hull with a low-pressure 76 mm main gun mounted in a British FV101 Scorpion Tank turret. Originally intended to be used as a tank trainer in Canada and as a light armoured vehicle in peace keeping missions Cougars entered service in the late 1970s in Canadian based regular and reserve Armoured Recce Regiments. They were also used as a quick air transportable fighting vehicle by the CAST Brigade for Cold War service in Norway and later with the 1st Canadian Division in NATO's CENTAG. They were too lightly armed to be effective against MBTs however the end of the Cold War saw their deployment on stability operations in Serbia and Somalia. Also used for tank crew training in Canada, and limited training exercises alongside Leopard tanks brought back from the bases in Germany in 1994. |
| Coyote Armoured Reconnaissance Vehicle | A Canadian produced eight-wheeled armoured reconnaissance vehicle based on the LAV-25, 203 in service by 1996. |
| Leopard 1 | Main Battle Tank Leopard 1A3 type |
| Leopard C2 | Main Battle Tank Leopard 1A5 type |
| Leopard 2 | Main Battle Tank Leopard 2 type in gun tank, ARV, and AEVs variants. 3 variants of the gun tank, Leopard 2A4, Leopard 2A4M, and Leopard 2A6M. |
| TAPV Armoured Reconnaissance Vehicle. | Delivered starting in 2016 |

== See also ==
- Cold War tank formations
- Royal Armoured Corps
- Royal Australian Armoured Corps
- Royal Canadian Armoured Corps
- Royal New Zealand Armoured Corps
- Monarchy of Canada
- List of infantry weapons and equipment of the Canadian military
- List of modern Canadian Army equipment
