= RCAC =

RCAC may refer to:

- Royal Canadian Armoured Corps
- Royal Canadian Air Cadets
- Royal Canadian Army Cadets
- Recreational Canoe Association of Canada
