= Christina Lea Gilchrist =

Canadian sex worker (born 1991)

Christina Gilchrist
- Gilchrist in 2021, self-released photo also used in the Ottawa Citizen article about her in 2024
- Born: 20 October 1991 (age 34); Toronto, Ontario, Canada
- Citizenship: Canada
- Occupation: sex worker
- Website: sluts4soldiers.ca

Christina Lea Gilchrist (born 20 October 1991) is a Canadian sex worker, BDSM educator, and activist for the full decriminalization of sex work. Gilchrist gained notoriety in 2024 for advertising a 25% discount to members of the Canadian Armed Forces.

== Career ==
Gilchrist, born and raised in Eastern Toronto, moved to Kingston in 2012. She joined the local BDSM scene where she met a soldier "who put on his uniform" after engaging in "an intense military course called contact after capture" which "cemented soldiers as a fetish". Gilchrist is not a member of the military and is "not affiliated with the CAF in any capacity".

Gilchrist gained notoriety in 2024 for advertising a 25% discount to members of the Canadian Armed Forces. The discovery of her "SLUTS4SOLDIERS" business cards in the barracks resulted in CFB Kingston (a Canadian military installation in Ontario) issuing a base-wide memo warning troops to stay away from the Kingston-area woman. In response, private lawyer for members of the military Rory G Fowler commented: "I find it mildly offensive that a law enforcement agency that purportedly prides itself on professionalism, would threaten a civilian with criminal charges where that so-called law enforcement agency has no standing[.]"

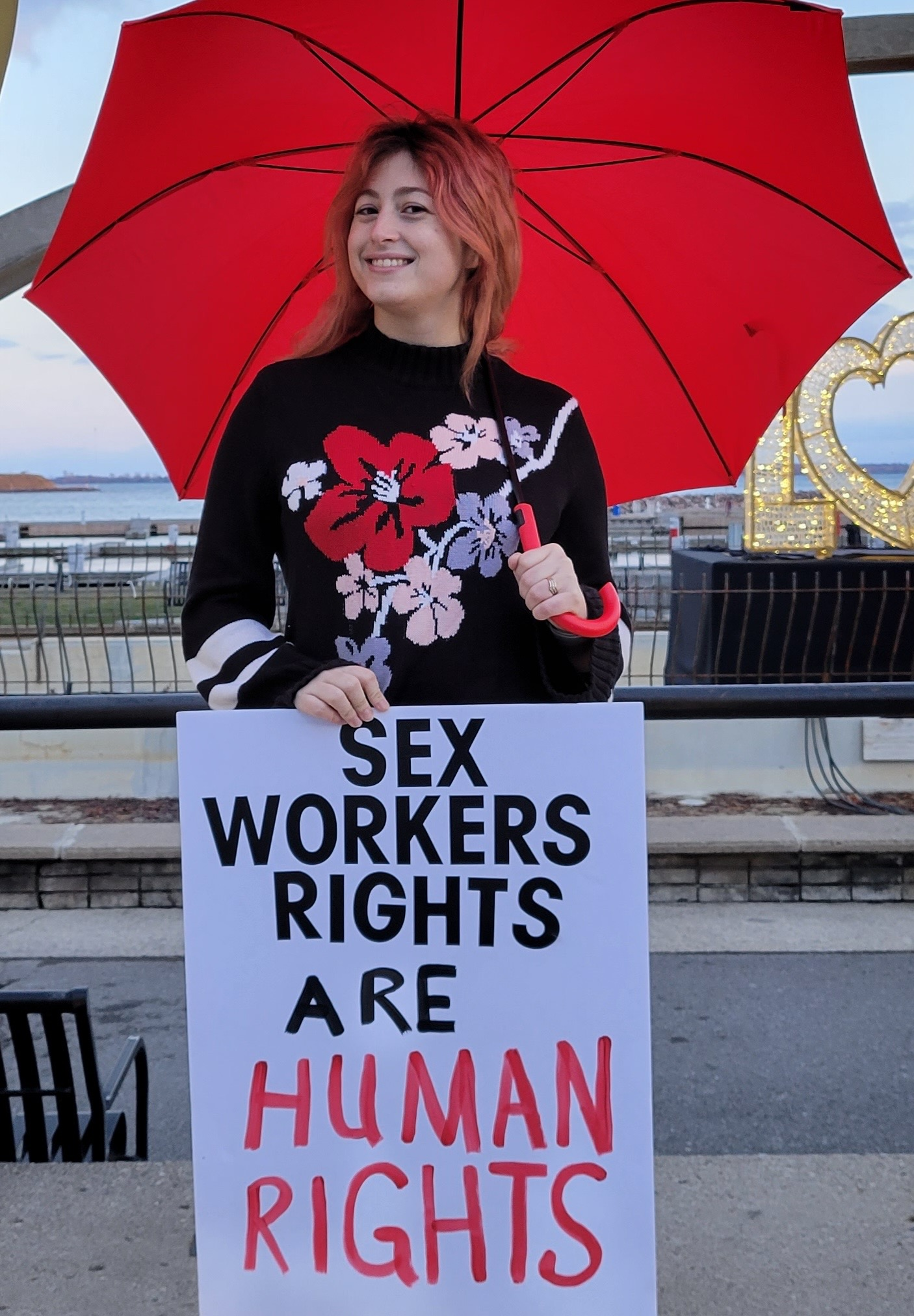

Gilchrist told the Daily Hive:

Canada needs to implement FULL DECRIMINALIZATION to protect the most at-risk people in our community, sex workers are your neighbours. Sex workers are in your family. We deserve to feel safe at work. We can't do that if our clients are afraid of being charged.
