= Royal Canadian Armoured Corps =

Armoured corps of the Canadian Army

- Corps blindé royal canadien
- Active: 13 August 1940 – present
- Country: Canada
- Branch: Canadian Army
- Type: Personnel branch
- Size: 3 Regular Force regiments; 18 Reserve Force regiments
- Mottos: "Worthy" (official); "Through the mud and the blood to the green fields beyond" (unofficial)
- Colours: Yellow and Red
- March: "My Boy Willie"
- Website: Official website

The Royal Canadian Armoured Corps (RCAC; French: Corps blindé royal canadien) is the armoured corps within the Canadian Army, including three Regular and 18 Reserve Force regiments, as well as the Royal Canadian Armoured Corps School.

The corps was formed as the Canadian Armoured Corps in 1940, within the Canadian Army (Active). In August 1945, it was given its "royal" designation, and following the Second World War, several Reserve Force units were incorporated into the corps. From 1968 until 2013, it was officially named the Armoured Branch.

== History ==
=== Pre-1940 ===
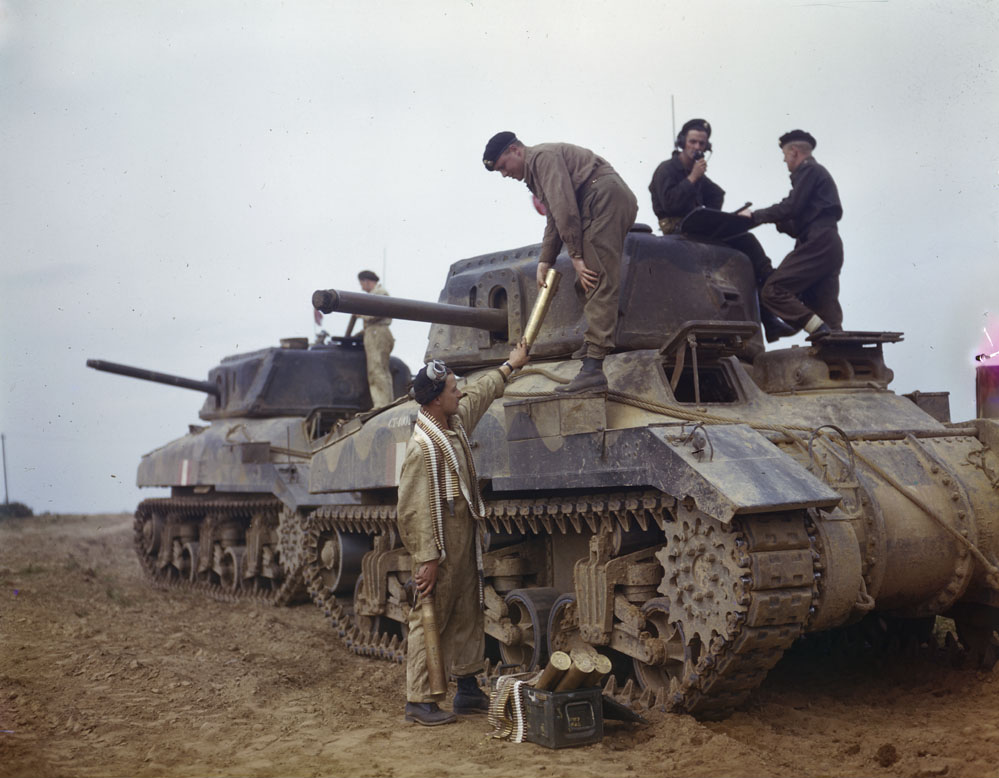
Canadian-manufactured Ram tanks during the Second World War. These AFVs were used primarily for training and did not see action as battle tanks, though a large number were converted into armoured personnel carriers, flamethrower carriers and armoured observation posts.

Originally formed as the Canadian Cavalry Corps in 1910, Canada's first tank units were not raised until late in 1918. Initially these units were considered to be part of the Machine Gun Corps and the 1st Canadian Tank Battalion, 2nd Canadian Tank Battalion and the 3^{e} Bataillon de chars d'assaut were all too late to join the fighting in the First World War. However, the 1st Canadian Tank Battalion was still training in Mark V tanks in the U.K. when the Canadian Tank Corps was finally authorized two days after the armistice. It seems like tanks were forgotten by the cavalry after the war. Although, in the 1930s there were some small attempts at mechanization with motorcycles, experimental armoured cars and the purchase of a few tracked Carden Loyd machine gun carriers for training. However, the first tanks since the First World War did not arrive until a few machine gun–armed Vickers Mk VI light tanks appeared just one year before Canada went to war with Germany again.

=== Regimental heritage ===
The first set of Canadian armoured regiments were drawn from the cavalry. Many armoured regiments were created from cavalry units, and in fact the first "armoured" regiments were titled "mechanized cavalry" regiments. The second set of regiments was drawn from the tank corps (which formerly belonged to first the infantry and then the machine gun corps). This began in 1936 with the creation of tank battalions and continued on from 1940 when many other types of regiment were mobilized as armoured units for the Second World War.

=== Second World War ===
From these modest beginnings the modern Canadian Armoured Corps began on 13 August 1940 with Major-General (then Colonel) F. F. Worthington as its first colonel-commandant. Over the course of the war from 1939 to 1944, the Armoured Corps gradually took over responsibilities from other corps, such as tank regiments all being converted to armoured regiments, the transition of infantry reconnaissance battalions to the Armoured Corps, as well as anti-armour responsibilities from the artillery corps. Towards the close of the Second World War, the corps was subsequently bestowed the honour of the 'royal' designation by King George VI in 1945.

Initially its equipment was 219 US M1917 tanks – a First World War design – obtained at scrap prices. They were sufficient for some training and familiarisation, but otherwise of very limited combat use. To form the 1st Army Tank Brigade, Valentine tanks were ordered. This British design was to be built in Canada. Aside from the necessary adjustments to the design to incorporate local engineering standards and available components, the Canadian Valentines used a GMC engine. This engine, being an improvement over the original, was later applied to British production. In practice, Canada never used most of the 1,400 Valentines they built, as they were supplied under lend-lease to the Soviet Union.

In early 1941 the 1st Tank Brigade was sent to Britain and equipped with the Matilda infantry tank. For the formation of two armoured divisions it was expected that 1,200 cruiser tanks were needed. The United Kingdom was not in a position to supply them, as it had shortfalls in supply for its own needs. This meant that Canada had to develop its own production. To this end a tank arsenal was set up under the management of a subsidiary of a US firm engaged in tank production in order to build the Ram and Grizzly tanks and their variants in Canada.

Events of the Second World War thrust Canada into large-scale tank production with thousands of Valentine, Ram, and Grizzly (Sherman) tanks and their armoured variants being produced. Canada also went on to build modern armoured fighting vehicles that served during the Cold War, the War in Afghanistan and global peacekeeping operations.

=== Post-war ===
In 1955, the corps was given an official French title (Corps blindé royal canadien) in addition to the English title.

In 1968, with the unification of the Canadian Army into the Canadian Armed Forces, the name of the Royal Canadian Armoured Corps was changed to simply the Armour Branch. Despite the change however, the corps continued to use its traditional title. In 2003, Canada planned to replace all its tanks with lightweight M1128 mobile gun systems. In 2007, due to experience gained during Afghanistan, Leopard tanks were purchased. In April 2013, the traditional designation of the "Royal Canadian Armoured Corps" was restored for official use.

== Training ==
=== Royal Canadian Armoured Corps School ===
The Royal Canadian Armoured Corps School at CFB Gagetown, New Brunswick, designs and conducts tactical and technical training for armoured crewmen and officers, in addition to maintaining specialized qualifications on behalf of the Canadian Army. Crewmen and officers are trained on the Leopard 2A4 MBT, Coyote Reconnaissance Vehicle, LAV 6, and Textron tactical armoured patrol vehicle.

=== Tactics School ===
The Tactics School at CFB Gagetown develops, conducts and monitors combined-arms operations. Within a battle group context, the Tactics School focusses on tactics, techniques, and procedures at the combat team level. The Tactics School's mission is to educate and train army junior officers in the integration of combat functions at the combat team level on the tactical battlefield.

== Regular Force ==
A doctrinal Canadian armoured regiment consists of four squadrons of medium to heavy tanks, as well as a close reconnaissance troop equipped with light tanks and/or armoured cars.

Order of precedence	Regiment	Headquarters	Role	Sub-Units
1	Royal Canadian Dragoons	CFB Petawawa	Armoured	Three light armoured squadrons.
2	Lord Strathcona's Horse (Royal Canadians)	CFB Edmonton	Armoured	Three tank squadrons.
3	12^{e} Régiment blindé du Canada	CFB Valcartier	Armoured	Three light armoured squadrons.

When required an armoured regiment will be tasked to provide an armoured squadron to its higher formation to provide it with a formation mounted reconnaissance capability.

== Primary Reserve ==
Order of precedence	Regiment	Headquarters	Role
1	Governor General's Horse Guards	Toronto, Ontario	Household cavalry/armoured reconnaissance
2	8th Canadian Hussars (Princess Louise's)	Moncton, New Brunswick	Armoured reconnaissance
3	Halifax Rifles (RCAC)	Halifax, Nova Scotia	Armoured reconnaissance
4	Ontario Regiment (RCAC)	Oshawa, Ontario	Armoured reconnaissance
5	Queen's York Rangers (1st American Regiment) (RCAC)	Toronto, Ontario	Armoured reconnaissance
6	Sherbrooke Hussars	Sherbrooke, Quebec	Armoured reconnaissance
7	12^{e} Régiment blindé du Canada (Milice)	Trois-Rivières, Quebec	Armoured reconnaissance
8	1st Hussars	London, Ontario	Armoured reconnaissance
9	Prince Edward Island Regiment (RCAC)	Charlottetown, Prince Edward Island	Armoured reconnaissance
10	Royal Canadian Hussars (Montreal)	Montreal, Quebec	Armoured reconnaissance
11	British Columbia Regiment (Duke of Connaught's Own)	Vancouver, British Columbia	Armoured reconnaissance
12	South Alberta Light Horse	Medicine Hat, Alberta	Light Cavalry
13	Saskatchewan Dragoons	Moose Jaw, Saskatchewan	Armoured reconnaissance
14	King's Own Calgary Regiment (RCAC)	Calgary, Alberta	Armoured reconnaissance
15	British Columbia Dragoons	Kelowna, British Columbia	Armoured reconnaissance
16	Fort Garry Horse	Winnipeg, Manitoba	Armoured reconnaissance
17	Régiment de Hull (RCAC)	Gatineau, Quebec	Armoured reconnaissance
18	Windsor Regiment (RCAC)	Windsor, Ontario	Armoured reconnaissance

== Supplementary Order of Battle ==
Units on the Supplementary Order of Battle legally exist, but have no personnel or materiel.

Regiment	Formed	To SOB	Headquarters
4th Princess Louise Dragoon Guards	1875	1965	Ottawa, Ontario
12th Manitoba Dragoons	1903	1964	Winnipeg, Manitoba
14th Canadian Hussars	1910	1968	Swift Current, Saskatchewan

== Equipment ==
List of current vehicles operated by the RCAC include:

Vehicle	Role
Leopard 2	Main battle tank
LAV 6.0	Infantry fighting vehicle
Coyote Reconnaissance Vehicle	Armoured reconnaissance vehicle
Textron tactical armoured patrol vehicle	Armoured Reconnaissance Vehicle
G-Wagon	Light utility vehicle (armour kits available to be fitted)

=== List of tanks and combat vehicles ===
Vehicle	Role
Mark V tank	Intended for combat; however, the end of WWI ceased further training
Carden Loyd tankette	Training
Vickers Light Tank Mk VI	Tank training and driver training
M1917	Tank training and driver training
Valentine tank	Lend-Lease for the Soviet Union, and tank training
Matilda tank	Tank training
M3 Lee	Tank training
Ram tank	Tank training, and combat support in several variants
Churchill tank	Combat tank at Dieppe, in Italy, Normandy and NW Europe
M3 & M5 Stuart	M3 used mostly as a training tank while in England; M5 widely used as a reconnaissance tank throughout WWII; also used as a training tank with reserve units for more than a decade after the war.
Grizzly I cruiser	Tank training
Sherman M4A1 tank	Combat tank at in Italy, Normandy and NW Europe
Sherman Firefly	Combat tank in Normandy and NW Europe, adapted for combat against more heavily armoured German Tiger and Panther tanks
Staghound Armoured Car	Issued to armoured car and reconnaissance regiments in the NW Europe campaign.
Sherman M4A2E8 and M4A3E8	Main battle tank for training and combat in Korea
M24 Chaffee light tank	Reconnaissance tank
Centurion Tank	Main battle tank, and support variants
Ferret Armoured Car	Wheeled scout car
Lynx reconnaissance vehicle	Tracked reconnaissance vehicle
Cougar AVGP	Direct-fire support vehicle (wheeled), tank trainer and light armoured vehicle
Coyote Armoured Reconnaissance Vehicle	Wheeled armoured reconnaissance vehicle
Leopard 1	Main battle tank
Leopard C2	Main battle tank
Leopard 2	Main battle tank in gun tank, ARV, and AEVs variants
Textron tactical armoured patrol vehicle	Wheeled patrol and reconnaissance vehicle

== Order of precedence ==
RCHA on parade without guns: (See note below)

Preceded by Army elements of Royal Military College of Canada	Royal Canadian Armoured Corps	Succeeded by Royal Canadian Artillery

RCHA on parade with guns: (See note below)

Preceded by Royal Canadian Horse Artillery	Royal Canadian Armoured Corps	Succeeded by Royal Canadian Artillery

Note: The honour of "the right of the line" (precedence over other units), on an army parade, is held by the units of the Royal Canadian Horse Artillery when on parade with their guns. On dismounted parades, RCHA units take precedence over all other land force units except formed bodies of officer cadets of the Royal Military College representing their college. RCA units parade to the left of units of the Royal Canadian Armoured Corps.

== See also ==
- Royal Armoured Corps
- Royal Australian Armoured Corps
- Royal New Zealand Armoured Corps
- Category: Armoured regiments of Canada
- Supplementary Order of Battle
- Tanks of Canada
- List of modern Canadian Army equipment
- List of infantry weapons and equipment of the Canadian military
