= Canadian Army Doctrine and Training Centre =

- Centre de doctrine et d'instruction de l'Armée canadienne
- CADTC formation patch
- Active: 2000–present
- Country: Canada
- Branch: Canadian Army
- Type: Training centre (2000–2026); Training division (2026–present)
- Role: Army training
- Size: 3,200 regular and reserve personnel
- Part of: Canadian Army
- Garrison/HQ: Kingston, Ontario
- Motto: Victoria per scientia
- Website: canada.ca/en/army/corporate/canadian-army-doctrine-and-training-centre.html

Commanders
- Commander: Major General John W. Errington
- Deputy Commander: Colonel Tyler R. Donnell
- Deputy Commander (Reserve): Brigadier General Guinevere Bourque
- Formation CWO: Chief Warrant Officer Pascal Gagné
- Formation CWO (Reserve): Chief Warrant Officer Bryan Gardner

The Canadian Army Doctrine and Training Centre (CADTC) (French: Centre de doctrine et d'instruction de l'Armée canadienne), formerly the Land Force Doctrine and Training System (LFDTS), is a formation of the Canadian Army headquartered at McNaughton Barracks, CFB Kingston, Ontario. CADTC is the organization that is responsible for delivering army training and developing army doctrine. Approximately 3,200 officers and soldiers are assigned to CADTC. The organization was renamed on 18 July 2013 as part of the reorganization of the Canadian Army. In 2026, the CADTC was reorganized into a training division with the purpose of unifying the Canadian Army's training centres into a single formation.

== Structure ==
The Canadian Army Doctrine and Training Centre is composed of its headquarters in Kingston and a number of training establishments across Canada.

- Canadian Army Doctrine and Training Centre Headquarters, at CFB Kingston
  - Canadian Army Command and Staff College, at CFB Kingston
  - Canadian Manoeuvre Training Centre, at CFB Wainwright
  - Army Doctrine Centre, at CFB Kingston
  - Canadian Army Simulation Centre, at CFB Kingston
  - Canadian Army Lessons Learned Centre, at CFB Kingston
  - Peace Support Training Centre, at CFB Kingston
  - Canadian Armed Forces Arctic Training Centre, in Resolute (Nunavut))
  - Combat Training Centre at CFB Gagetown
  - Army Training Centre

== See also ==
- History of the Canadian Army
- Canadian Forces
