= Peace Support Training Centre =

Coordinates: 44.246157°N 76.45427°W

- Centre de formation pour le soutien de la paix
- Badge
- Country: Canada
- Branch: Canadian Army
- Type: Military education and training
- Part of: Canadian Army Doctrine and Training Centre
- Headquarters: CFB Kingston
- Mottos: Disce, præpara, flore (Latin for 'Learn, prepare, succeed')
- Website: canada.ca/en/department-national-defence/services/benefits-military/education-training/establishments/peace-support.html

The Peace Support Training Centre (PSTC; French: Centre de formation pour le soutien de la paix), is at McNaughton Barracks, CFB Kingston, Ontario, Canada, and is a subordinate unit of the Canadian Army Doctrine and Training Centre. PSTC delivers training to the Canadian Armed Forces (CAF), other Canadian government departments (OGDs), and foreign militaries. PSTC is also engaged in instructor exchanges with ABCA, NATO, and other countries.

== Role ==
PSTC was formed in July 1996 and was officially established as a unit 5 September 2000. With an original mandate of training personnel for United Nations Military Observer (UNMO) positions, the PSTC has expanded to a unit of over 60 personnel that runs on average 35 courses per year with a throughput of 1,000 students.

PSTC also developed training for personnel working as part of provincial reconstruction teams (PRT), and Security Force Capacity Building/Security Force Advisor Training (SFCB/SFAT).

=== Mission ===
"PSTC will provide specific, individual training to prepare selected members of the Canadian Forces, other government departments (OGD) and foreign military personnel for full-spectrum operations (FSO) within the contemporary operating environment, while fulfilling our centre of excellence (CoE) responsibilities."

=== Courses and training packages ===
- Civil-Military Cooperation (CIMIC) Operator
- Civil-Military Cooperation (CIMIC) Staff Officer
- Hazardous Environment Training (HET)
- Individual Pre-Deployment Training (IPT)
- Information Operations (Info Ops) Officer
- United Nations Military Expert on Mission Training (UNMO Military Observer) (UNMEM)
- Psychological Operations (PSYOPS) Tactical Operator
- Psychological Operations (PSYOPS) Analyst
- Psychological Operations (PSYOPS) Officer

== Organization ==
PSTC is a training unit directly under the Canadian Army Doctrine and Training Centre. It has a liaison and coordination relationship with the Influence Activities Task Force (IATF), another organization under CADTC. PSTC has two training sub-units and a standards sub-unit. The training sub-units and their specialties are as follows:

- A Squadron – Military Observer, Hazardous Environment Training, Individual Pre-Deployment Training, Security Force Advisory Training.
- B Squadron - Civil-Military Cooperation, Information Operations, Psychological Operations
