= CFB Chilliwack =

Former Canadian Forces base in British Columbia, Canada

Coordinates: 49°6′11.35″N 121°57′46.05″W

- Chilliwack, British Columbia, Canada
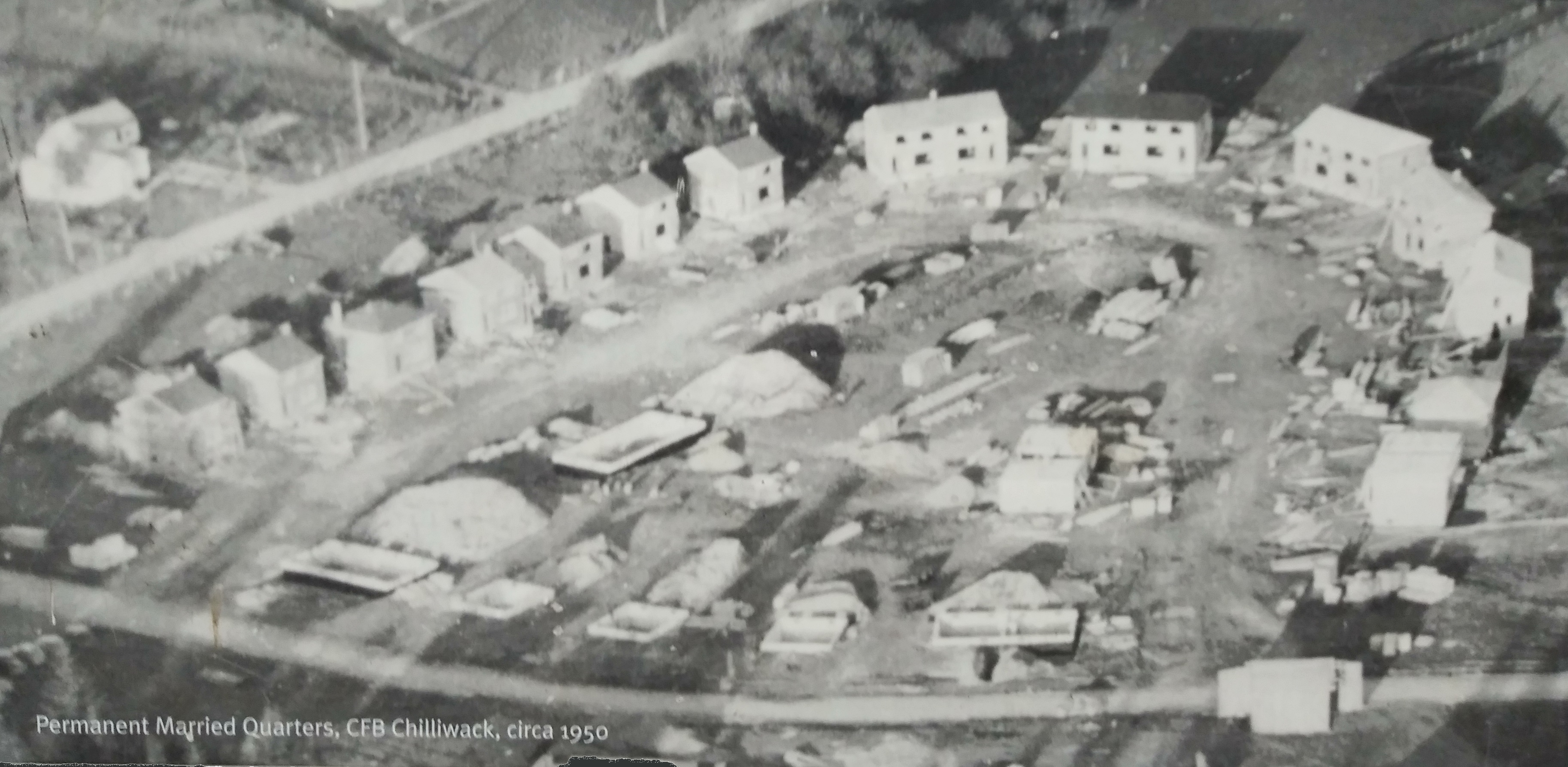
- Aerial photo of the Permanent Married Quarters CFB, Chilliwack

Site information
- Type: Military base
- Controlled by: Canadian Forces

Site history
- Built: 1942
- In use: 1942–present

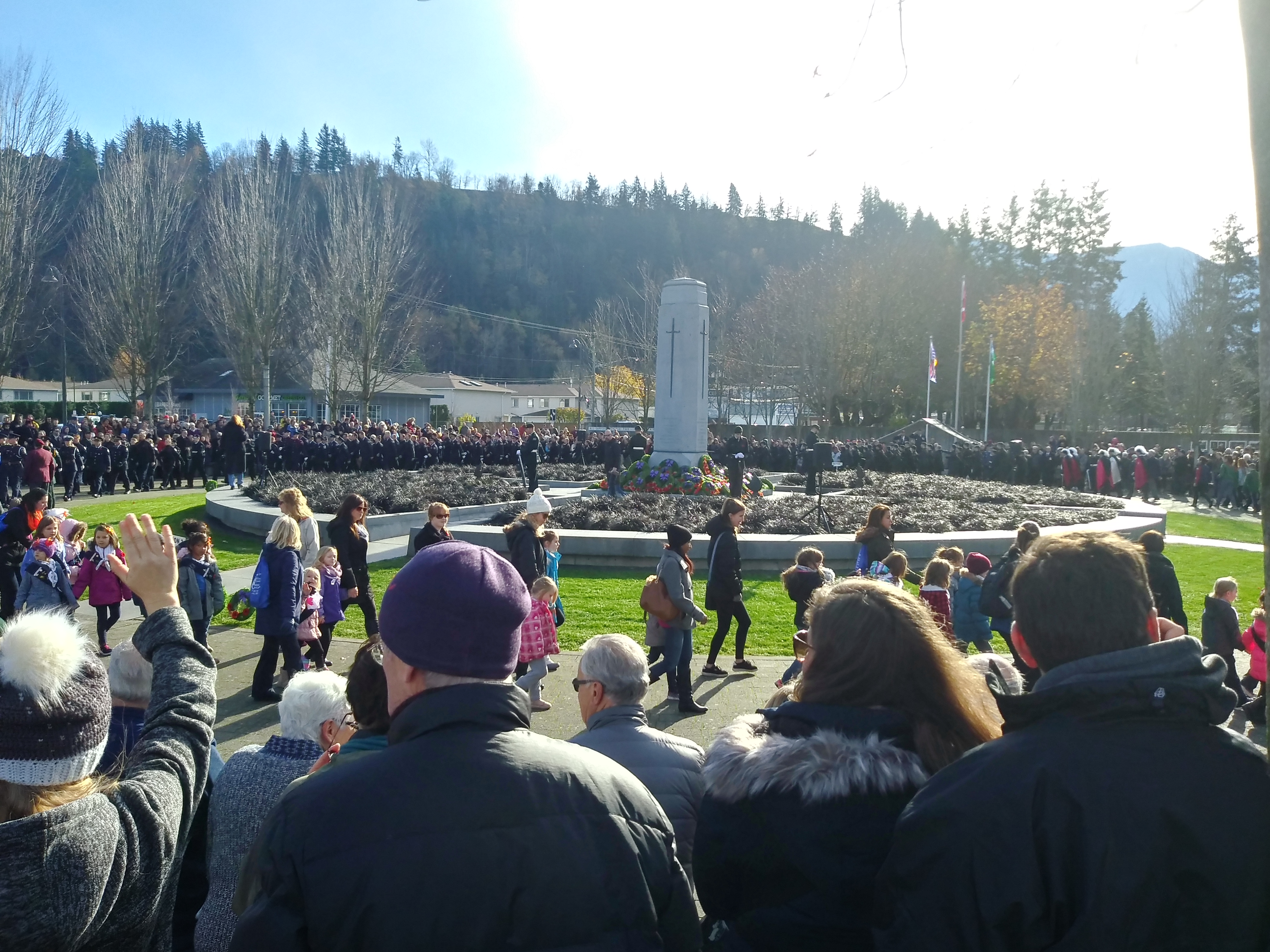
CFB Chilliwack memorial cenotaph at Keith Wilson and Vedder, Nov. 11, 2018

Canadian Forces Base Chilliwack (also CFB Chilliwack) was a Canadian Forces base located in Chilliwack, British Columbia.

== Camp Chilliwack ==
Military Camp Chilliwack (shortened to Camp Chilliwack) was established on February 15, 1942, on a parcel of land in the rural community of Vedder Crossing, along the north side of the Vedder River several kilometres east of its discharge point into the Fraser River. The property was bounded by Keith Wilson Road and Vedder Road and was intended as a Canadian Army post for defending the Lower Mainland of British Columbia.

Camp Chilliwack was created only two months after the Empire of Japan's surprise attack on Pearl Harbor, launching the Pacific Theatre of World War II. The swift succession of Japanese operations in the Aleutian Islands and a submarine presence off the west coast of North America, coupled with the fall of Hong Kong took the Department of National Defence by surprise.

The Canadian military's presence in British Columbia was restricted at that time to the Royal Canadian Navy base at Esquimalt on southern Vancouver Island plus a chain of RCAF land-based and flying boat stations including Sea Island (Vancouver), Victoria, Allingford Bay, Bella Coola and Prince Rupert. The rapid flow of events during late 1941 and early 1942 saw the United States military presence in the Pacific Northwest expand dramatically, with corresponding increases in Canada to meet the perceived Japanese threat. One manifestation was the agreement in February 1942 by both nations to construct the Alaska Highway as a defence project, followed by the Royal Air Force's decision to construct RAF Station Comox to boost Commonwealth air defence for Canada's west coast.

Camp Chilliwack opened several months later and housed several army units for territorial defence. But it soon became apparent as 1942 wore on that the Japanese threat to mainland North America was minor. Consequently, Camp Chilliwack was also designated as a recruit training centre and hosted the No. 112 Canadian Army Basic Training Centre, as well as the A6 Canadian Engineering Training Centre (which was moved from Camp Dundurn in Saskatchewan).

During the postwar years and into the Cold War, Camp Chilliwack continued to operate as a permanent training establishment for the Canadian Army, as well as providing support to regular and reserve army units in British Columbia. The A6 Canadian Engineering Training Centre was renamed the Royal Canadian School of Military Engineering. In 1957, the 58th Field Engineer Squadron moved from the navy base at Esquimalt to Camp Chillwack.

In 1968, Canada unified its military forces when it merged the Canadian Army, Royal Canadian Air Force and Royal Canadian Navy to create the Canadian Forces. Camp Chilliwack was renamed "Canadian Forces Base Chilliwack" (CFB Chilliwack) to reflect the new organization.

The Royal Canadian School of Military Engineering was renamed the Canadian Forces School of Military Engineering following unification, and in 1970 the Canadian Forces Officer Candidate School (CFOCS) moved to CFB Chilliwack.

In 1977, 3 Field Squadron was renamed 1 Combat Engineer Regiment.

CFB Chilliwack took responsibility for supporting all Canadian Forces units in the lower mainland of British Columbia, including the Jericho Beach Garrison in Vancouver.

In 1994, the 3rd Battalion, Princess Patricia's Canadian Light Infantry moved to CFB Chilliwack from Esquimalt, the last new unit to transfer to the facility.

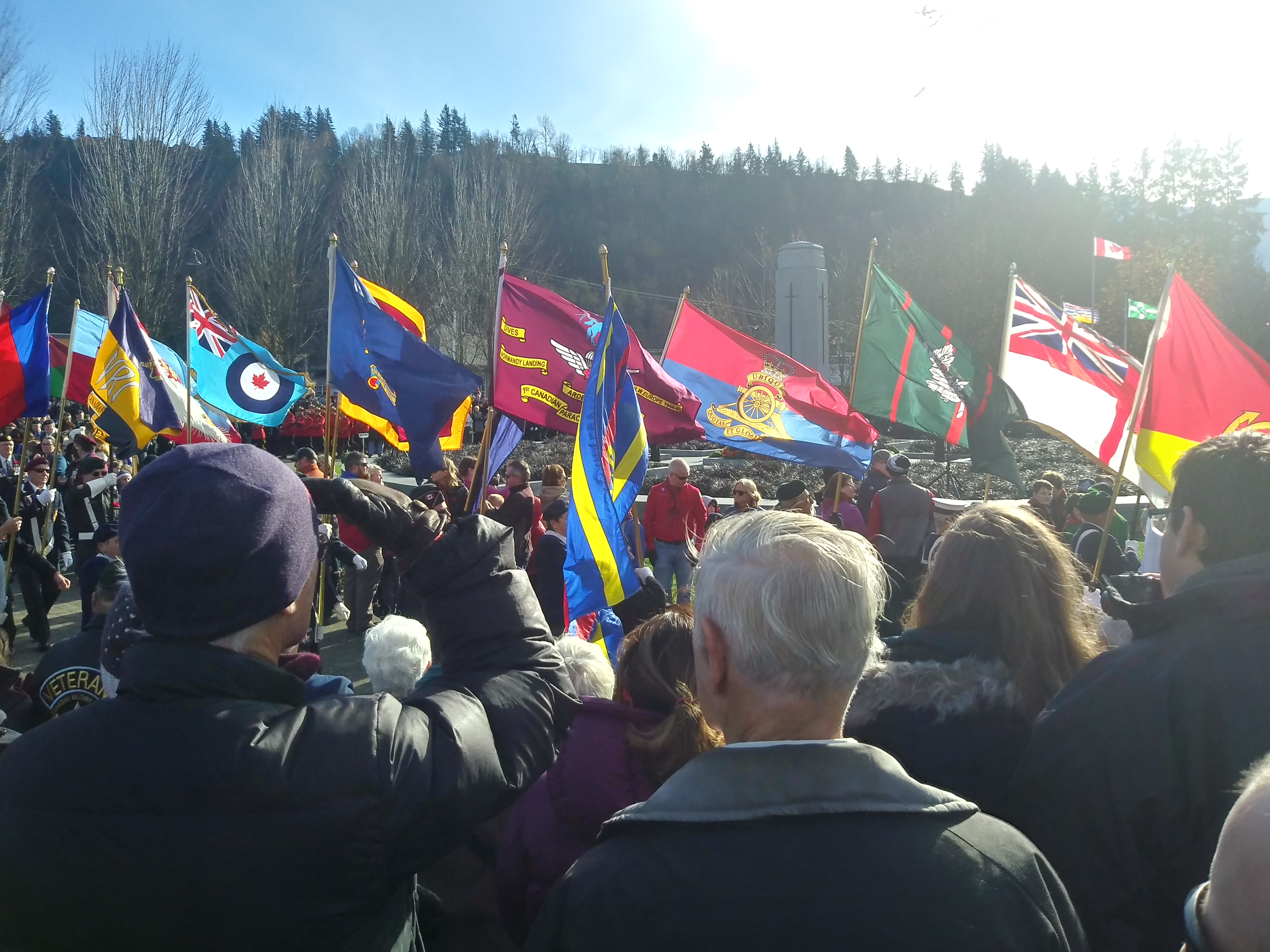
Flags at CFB Chilliwack memorial cenotaph at Keith Wilson and Vedder, 2018

== Closure ==
Defence budget cutbacks and force consolidation following the end of the Cold War saw CFB Chilliwack identified in the mid-1990s as a candidate for closure by 1997. The CFOCS was moved to ASU St-Jean while the CFSME was moved to CFB Gagetown and 3PPCLI moved to CFB Edmonton.

The base consisted of two separate properties; the Vedder Creek location was the main part of the base and was mothballed, whereas the Chilcotin training area and firing ranges were kept by DND for use by local reserve units in the Vancouver area.

Area Support Unit Chilliwack (ASU Chilliwack) was established on September 2, 1997, at the Vedder Creek property to provide support to reserve and regular force units on mainland British Columbia, while the remainder of the Vedder Creek property has been transferred to the Canada Lands Company for disposal and is currently being developed into a residential subdivision named "Garrison Crossing."

After the closure of CFB Chilliwack, the Royal Engineer Log Building was moved by 6 Field Squadron from CFB Chilliwack to the Six Field Engineer Squadron Museum Association's Armoury in 2000. It was originally built in 1860 to provide accommodation for the Royal Engineer team surveying the 49th parallel between Canada and the United States.

== Post office ==
CFB Chiliwack had a Military Post Office (MPO) from July 1944 to August 1946. A regular post office with the name "CFB Chilliwack" was opened in 1979.
