= Canadian Forces School of Military Engineering =

- École du génie militaire des Forces canadiennes
- School badge
- CFB Gagetown, New Brunswick; Canada

Information
- Former names: Royal Canadian School of Military Engineering; Royal Canadian Engineer Training Centre
- Type: Military engineering
- Motto: Ductores docemus (Latin for 'We teach leaders')
- Established: July 1907
- Status: Open
- Closed: 1914–1917 (World War I)

The Canadian Forces School of Military Engineering (CFSME), at CFB Gagetown in Oromocto, New Brunswick, is responsible for the conduct of 85 different courses that span all ranks and occupations within the Combat Engineering and Construction Engineering organizations. CFSME is the Canadian Forces centre of excellence in military engineer training.

Originally A6 Canadian Engineering Training Centre, the school was established in Camp Dundurn in Saskatchewan and then moved to Chilliwack, British Columbia, to train military engineers for the Canadian Army during the Second World War. The A6 Canadian Engineering Training Centre was renamed the Royal Canadian School of Military Engineering.

In 1968 Canada unified its military forces when it merged the Canadian Army, Royal Canadian Air Force and Royal Canadian Navy to create the Canadian Forces. The Royal Canadian School of Military Engineering was renamed the Canadian Forces School of Military Engineering following unification. It also became responsible for the military engineering training for the whole of the Canadian Forces. On the closing of CFB Chilliwack in the late 1990s the school moved to its current location in CFB Gagetown.

The school exists as a unit of the Combat Training Centre and it consists of the following sub-units:

- Field Engineering Training Squadron (FETS)
- Construction Engineering Training Squadron (CETS)
- Reserve Engineer Training Squadron (RETS)
- Tactics Squadron
- Construction Engineering and Management Squadron (CEMS)
- Explosive Ordnance Disposal Squadron (EOD)
- Standards and Training Development Squadron (STDS)
- Administration Squadron
