= CFB Kingston =

Canadian military base in Kingston, Ontario

Coordinates: 44°14′30″N 76°27′00″W

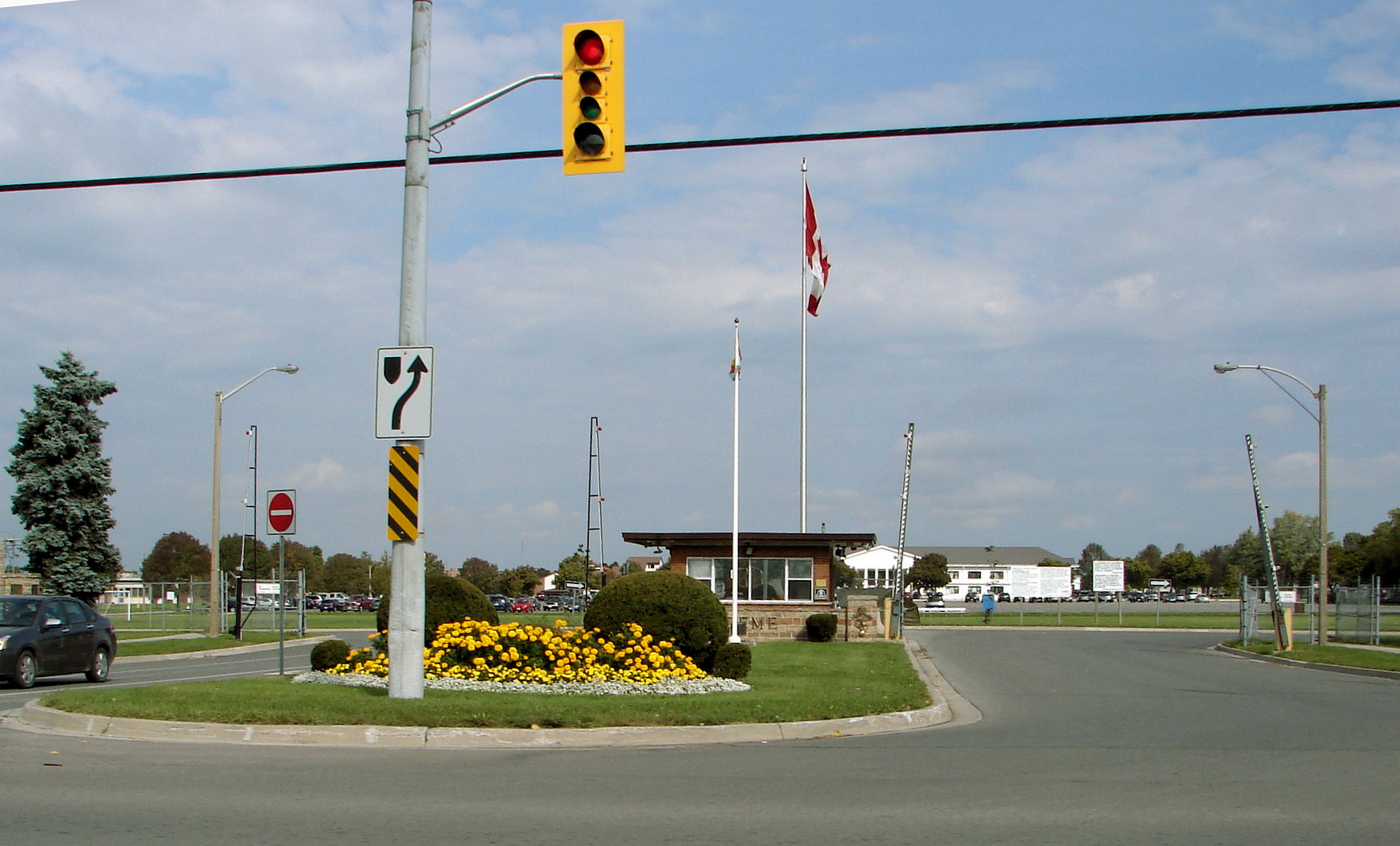
Main entrance of CFB Kingston

Canadian Forces Base Kingston (also CFB Kingston) is a Canadian Forces base in Kingston, Ontario.

== History ==
The Barriefield Military Camp, commonly called Camp Barriefield, was established as a military base at the outbreak of the First World War in 1914 on the east bank of the Cataraqui River opposite the city of Kingston in the village of Barriefield. Located north of King's Highway 2, the name of the military base and village was in honour of the Royal Navy's Rear-Admiral Sir Robert Barrie who served during the War of 1812.

In 1937 the base expanded to the south side of King's Highway 2 with the opening of the Vimy Barracks, named in honour of the Battle of Vimy Ridge. The Vimy Barracks became home to the Royal Canadian Corps of Signals which relocated to the Barriefield Military Camp from the Borden Military Camp. The Signal Training Centre, later renamed the Royal Canadian School of Signals was also established at the base.

The Barriefield Military Camp continued to expand as one of Canada's largest training bases when the Royal Canadian Ordnance Corps established a training centre during the Second World War. Following the war, the original part of Barriefield Military Camp on the north side of the King's Highway 2 was renamed the McNaughton Barracks in honour of the Canadian Army's General A.G.L. McNaughton who served during the First and Second World Wars. From 1945 to 1969 the McNaughton Barracks were host to the Royal Canadian Electrical and Mechanical Engineers School.

The base was renamed to Canadian Forces Base Kingston (CFB Kingston) in 1966 in the lead-up to the February 1968 unification of the Canadian Army, Royal Canadian Navy and Royal Canadian Air Force to form the Canadian Armed Forces. CFB Kingston was placed under Training Command and was responsible for providing training facilities and support services to its integral units and lodger units.

In September 1975, Training Command was disbanded and the base was transferred to Canadian Forces Training System. The Royal Military College of Canada, the National Defence College, the Canadian Land Force Command and Staff College and the Canadian Forces School of Communications and Electronics were some of the units supported by the base and under the authority of the commander of CFB Kingston. On September 1, 1988, the 1st Canadian Division Headquarters was established to serve as a staging base for the deployment of troops and materiel on active operations; in this role it supported Operation Friction which was Canada's support to the United Nations for the Persian Gulf War in 1991.

On March 30, 1995, responsibility for CFB Kingston was transferred to Land Force Command, now known as the Canadian Army (since August 2011).

On June 26, 1997, Air Command reorganized by disbanding the 10 Tactical Air Group and replacing this unit with the newly formed 1 Wing. The headquarters for 1 Wing was relocated to CFB Kingston, however, the unit's six tactical helicopter squadrons flying the CH-146 Griffon were spread out at Canadian Forces bases across the country.

== Lodger units ==
Primarily a training base, CFB Kingston is home to the following lodger units:

- Canadian Army
  - Canadian Army Doctrine and Training Centre (CADTC)
  - 1st Canadian Division, Headquarters
  - Peace Support Training Centre (PSTC)
  - Princess of Wales' Own Regiment (PWOR)
  - Communications and Electronics Branch
    - Canadian Forces School of Communications and Electronics (CFSCE)
    - Canadian Forces Joint Signal Regiment
    - 21 Electronic Warfare Regiment
    - 772 Electronic Warfare Squadron
    - 2 Electronic Warfare Squadron
    - Canadian Forces Crypto Maintenance Unit
- Royal Canadian Air Force
  - 1 Wing (commonly referred to as 1 Wing Kingston)
- Royal Canadian Navy
  - HMCS Cataraqui
- Canadian Defence Academy
  - Royal Military College of Canada; CFB Kingston is the base designated to support RMC, located nearby at Point Frederick
- Canadian Forces Health Services Group
  - 1 Dental Unit — Detachment Kingston
  - 33 Canadian Forces Health Services Centre
- National Cadets & Junior Canadian Rangers Support Group
  - HMCS Ontario Cadet Training Centre
- Canadian Forces Joint Operations Group
- Canadian Forces Joint Support Group
- Canadian Forces National Counter-Intelligence Unit Detachment Kingston
- Military Post Office 305 Vimy Post Office
- Civilian Human Resources Office
- Kingston Garrison Learning and Career Centre
- Dispute Resolution Centre
- Canadian Forces Housing Agency
- 2 Military Police Regiment Detachment Kingston
- Military Communications and Electronics Museum
- Kingston Military Community Sports Center (PSP)
- Garrison Golf and Curling Club

=== Garrison Golf and Curling Club ===
Garrison Golf & Curling Club is a golf and curling club, located within CFB Kingston. Garrison is a private club, primarily for the use of Canadian Forces personnel and Canadian Department of National Defence employees, although civilians are also eligible to join. The Curling Club was established in 1961 with four sheets of ice, which it has operated since that time. The Golf Club began in 1971 with the first nine holes, designed by Richard H. Green, the longtime professional at Cataraqui Golf and Country Club, and Johnny Marsh. The second nine holes of golf were opened in 1985, and were based on a design by Tom McBroom, who has since become one of Canada's leading golf course architects.

The golf course has been a frequent host of Ontario and Canadian championships for the Canadian Forces, as well as local, regional, and provincial events. Matt McQuillan, now a member of the Canadian Professional Golf Tour and a tour winner, learned the game at Garrison as a junior player in the 1990s. McQuillan earned 2011 PGA Tour playing privileges in December, 2010.

== Architecture ==
CFB Kingston includes several recognized and classified federal heritage buildings on the Register of the Government of Canada Heritage Buildings.

- McNaughton Barracks
  - Canadian Forces Health Services Clinic, Building MB-62 Recognized - 2002
  - Lewis Hall, Building MB39 Recognized - 1996
  - Sherman Hall, Building MB37 Recognized - 1996
- Vimy Barracks
  - Barracks Block, Building VB-7 Recognized - 2002
  - Beament Hall, Building VB-2 Recognized - 1996
  - Carruthers Hall, Building VB-1 Recognized - 1996
  - Forde Building VB-16 Recognized - 1997
  - McKee Hall, Building VB-6 Recognized - 1996
  - Officer's Mess Building VC1 Recognized - 1996

== Awards ==
CFB Kingston received an award from the Ontario Power Authority's for their leadership in pursuing energy efficiency. CFB Kingston and Direct Energy partnered in 2005 to create the largest Federal Building Initiative project ever conducted in Canada, resulting in a $21-million energy performance contract (EPC) expected to save the base more than $2 million annually in utility costs. At CFB Kingston, energy efficiency measures cover a number of base-wide initiatives, such as lighting upgrades, improved building controls and water conservation.
