= Textron tactical armoured patrol vehicle =

Tactical armoured patrol vehicle
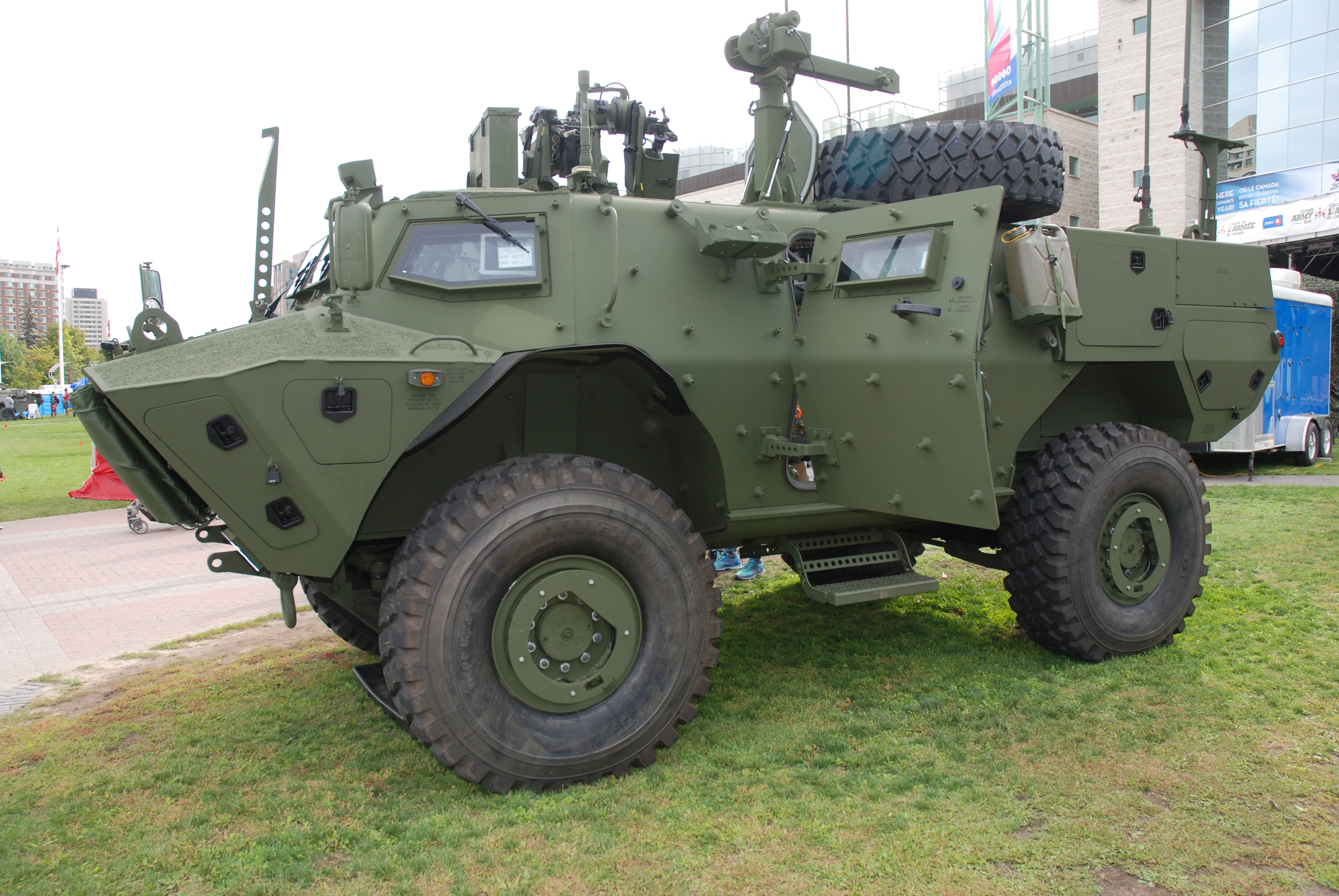
- A TAPV on display outside Ottawa City Hall.
- Type: Armoured car
- Place of origin: Canada; United States (design and manufacture)

Service history
- In service: 2016–present
- Used by: Canada

Production history
- Designer: Textron Systems
- Manufacturer: Textron Marine & Land Systems

Specifications
- Mass: 14,743 kg (32,503 lb) (curb, no armour), 17,743 kg (39,117 lb) (GVW, no armour), 16,435 kg (36,233 lb) (curb, with armour), 18,482 kg (40,746 lb) (GVW, with armour)
- Length: 6.31 m (248 in)
- Width: 2.75 m (108 in)
- Height: 3.225 m (127 in)
- Crew: 3 (commander, driver and gunner), 3 (passengers)
- Armour: Composite armour
- Main armament: 40 mm HK GMG
- Secondary armament: C6 general purpose machine gun
- Engine: Cummins QSL 365; 365 hp (272 kW); 1,113 lb⋅ft (1,509 N⋅m)
- Transmission: Allison MD3560 automatic (six forward, one reverse)
- Suspension: 4×4 wheeled, fully independent
- Operational range: 654 km (406 mi)
- Maximum speed: 110 km/h (68 mph)

The Textron TAPV (tactical armoured patrol vehicle) is an armoured car currently in use by the Canadian Army. It is essentially a more heavily armoured upgrade of the M1117 armoured security vehicle, developed for use by the military police of the US Armed Forces. In 2015, Textron rebranded the platform as the Commando family of vehicles, from which the TAPV most closely resembles the Command Elite variant. As of 2022 Textron was still marketing the product, then 10 years old.

== History ==
The TAPV program began in 2009, and in 2012 the contract was awarded to Textron Systems. 500 vehicles were purchased, with an unused option to order an additional 100. The vehicles were procured in two configurations: 193 in Reconnaissance configuration, and 307 in General Utility configuration. A total of 364 are equipped with a Kongsberg Protector RWS. Used for reconnaissance, troop transport, command & control, VIP transport, patrolling, and military police duties, the TAPV procurement provided a similar capability to the RG-31 Nyala MRAP vehicle procured by Canada as an Urgent Operational Requirement (UOR) for operations in Afghanistan. The TAPV has yet to see combat.

One Textron TAPV demonstration vehicle was built in 2011. Four pre-production vehicles were originally delivered to the Canadian Army and underwent various trials and training exercises with plans for an additional two to be delivered. First production vehicles were scheduled to be delivered in 2014, however deliveries ultimately began in August 2016 and were completed on 18 December, 2018, when the 500th and final TAPV was delivered. The new vehicle will gradually replace a portion of the Mercedes-Benz G-Wagon-based Light Utility Vehicle Wheeled (LUVW) Standard Military Pattern (SMP) fleet and Coyote armoured cars, which are currently in service with the Canadian Army.

Textron Systems Canada Inc., a Textron Inc. company, announced August 19, 2016, the delivery of the first TAPV to the Canadian Army. The Canadian Army fielded the first vehicles to the 5th Canadian Division Support Base Gagetown and the 2nd Canadian Division Support Base Valcartier.

Textron Systems planned to deliver at least 30 vehicles per month to the Canadian Army with all 500 vehicles scheduled to be delivered by December 2017. The fleet was to be distributed across seven bases.

The first operational exposure for the TAPV fleet was in early May 2017 when a task force from 2nd Canadian Division from Canadian Forces Base Valcartier deployed on Operation LENTUS to assist flooded communities in Quebec. The TAPV and LAV 6 family of armoured vehicles were featured in the media video coverage. Nearly 2,200 military members, deployed to the areas of Saint-Jean-sur-Richelieu, Shawinigan, Laval, Pierrefonds, Rigaud, Oka, and Gatineau in support of civilian authorities when provincial and territorial authorities became overwhelmed by the natural disaster.

== Design ==
The history of the design/bid process which was won by the Textron group is summarized in Esprit de Corps (magazine) volume 19 number 5.

=== Engine and suspension ===
The TAPV is powered by a Cummins QSL diesel engine, which provides 365 horsepower (272 kW), allowing the vehicle a maximum speed of 105 km/h (65 mph), and a maximum range of 644 km (400 miles). The vehicle utilizes an independent suspension axle system originally developed by Irish Timoney, and it has a central tire inflation system to prevent flat tires during combat operations.

=== Armour ===
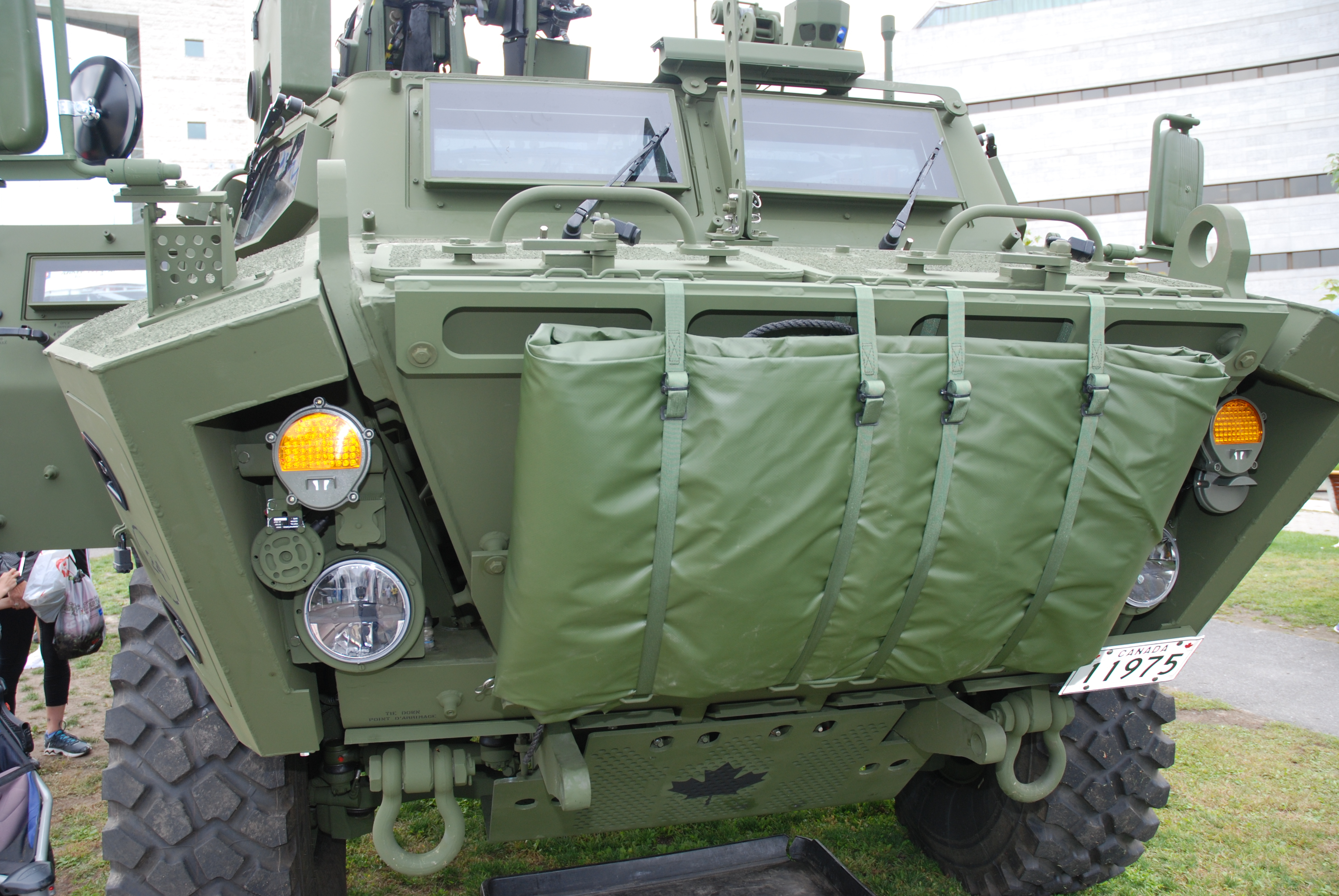
The TAPV from its front. It has an angled V-shaped hull.

The TAPV relies upon composite armour to provide the maximum protection to the vehicles occupants. The armour is stated as being 20% better than the armour on the M1117. The TAPV also has a V-shaped hull, which provides protection against mine and improvised explosive device (IED) blasts. The vehicle also has a high ground clearance, which increases protection from mine and IED blasts. It can withstand up to 10 kg of explosive force directly under its hull, and can resist even 12.7 mm armour-piercing rounds. Each of the seats in the vehicle are blast protected, and the vehicle has vented wheel wells to disperse the energy of an explosion out from the vehicle.

=== Armament ===
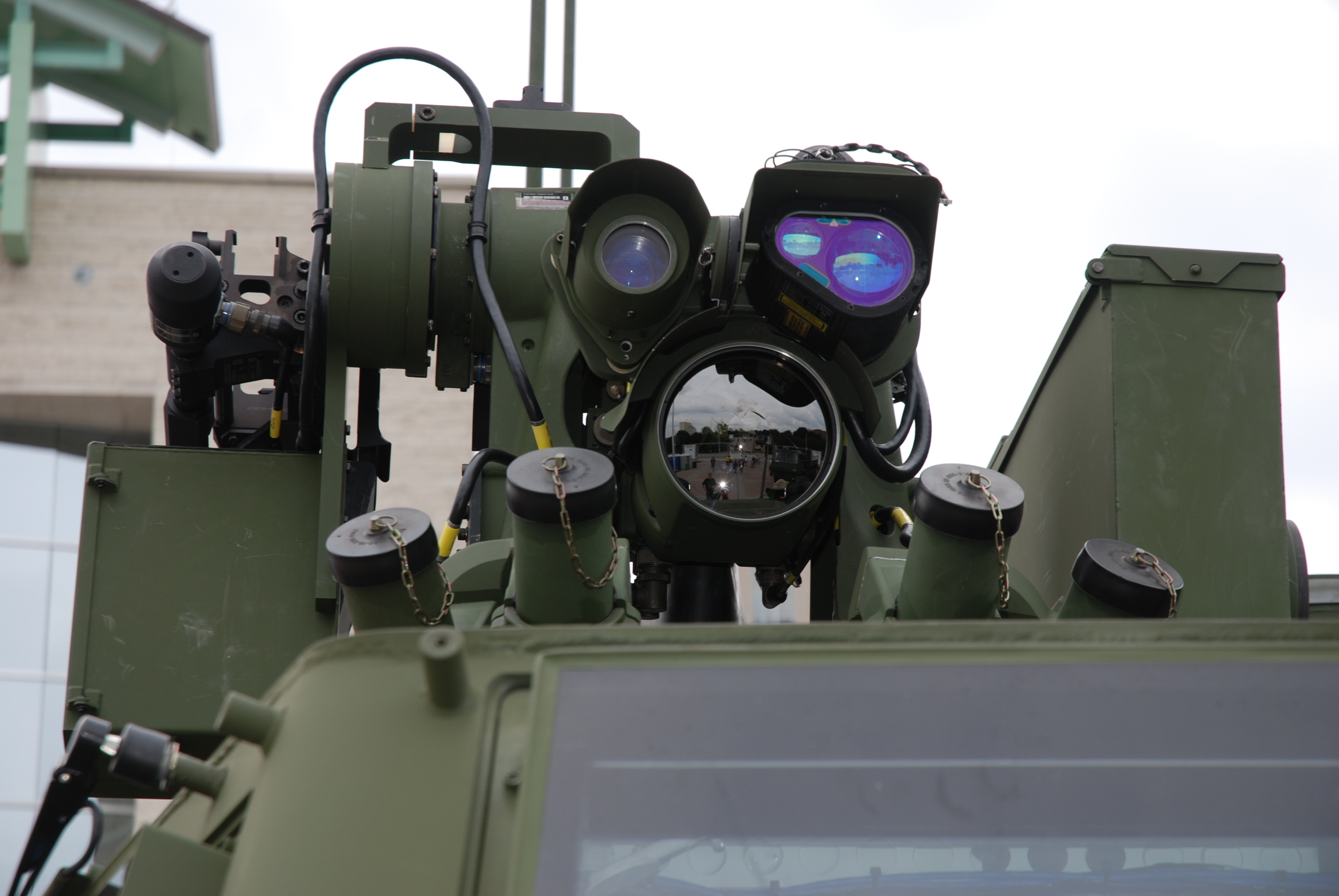
The Protector remote weapon system on a TAPV

A portion of the TAPV fleet was fielded with a remote weapons system based on the M151 Protector. The weapon system is called the Dual Remote Weapon System, and mounted both a C6 7.62 mm general purpose machine gun and a HK GMG 40 mm automatic grenade launcher. The vehicle also possesses smoke grenade launchers located on the remote weapon system.

=== Amphibious ===
The TAPV can handle water (fording) depth up to 1.5 metres (4.9 ft) but is not built as a fully amphibious vehicle.

== Operators ==
- Canada: Canadian Army - 500 in service

== See also ==
"Combat reconnaissance/patrol vehicle" with rear engine:

- BRDM-2 – (Soviet Union)
- D-442 FÚG – (Hungarian People's Republic)
- ABC-79M – (Romania)
- RBY MK 1 – (Israel)
- Fennek – (Germany)
