= CFB Gagetown =

Military base in New Brunswick, Canada

5th Canadian Division Support Base Gagetown Gagetown Heliport
- IATA: YCX; ICAO: CYCX; WMO: 71701

Summary
- Airport type: Military
- Owner: Government of Canada
- Operator: Canadian Armed Forces
- Location: Oromocto, New Brunswick
- Built: 1958
- Commander: Colonel K.E. Osmond
- Occupants: C Squadron, Royal Canadian Dragoons, 2nd Battalion, The Royal Canadian Regiment, 4th Artillery Regiment (General Support), 4 Engineer Support Regiment, 5th Canadian Division Training Centre, 5th Canadian Division Support Group, 31 Military Police Company
- Time zone: AST (UTC−04:00)
  - Summer (DST): ADT (UTC−03:00)
- Elevation AMSL: 166 ft (51 m)
- Coordinates: 45°50′16″N 066°26′12″W
- Website: https://www.canada.ca/en/army/corporate/5-canadian-division/5-canadian-division-support-base-gagetown.html

Map
- Location within New Brunswick Location within Canada

Helipads
Number	Length		Surface
Number	ft	m	Surface
H1	150	46	Asphalt
- Source: Canada Flight Supplement; Environment Canada

CFB Gagetown is a large Canadian Forces Base covering an area over 1,100 km^{2} (420 sq mi), located in southwestern New Brunswick. At 274,000 acres, it is the biggest facility in Eastern Canada, and Canada's second-largest facility.

== Construction of the base ==
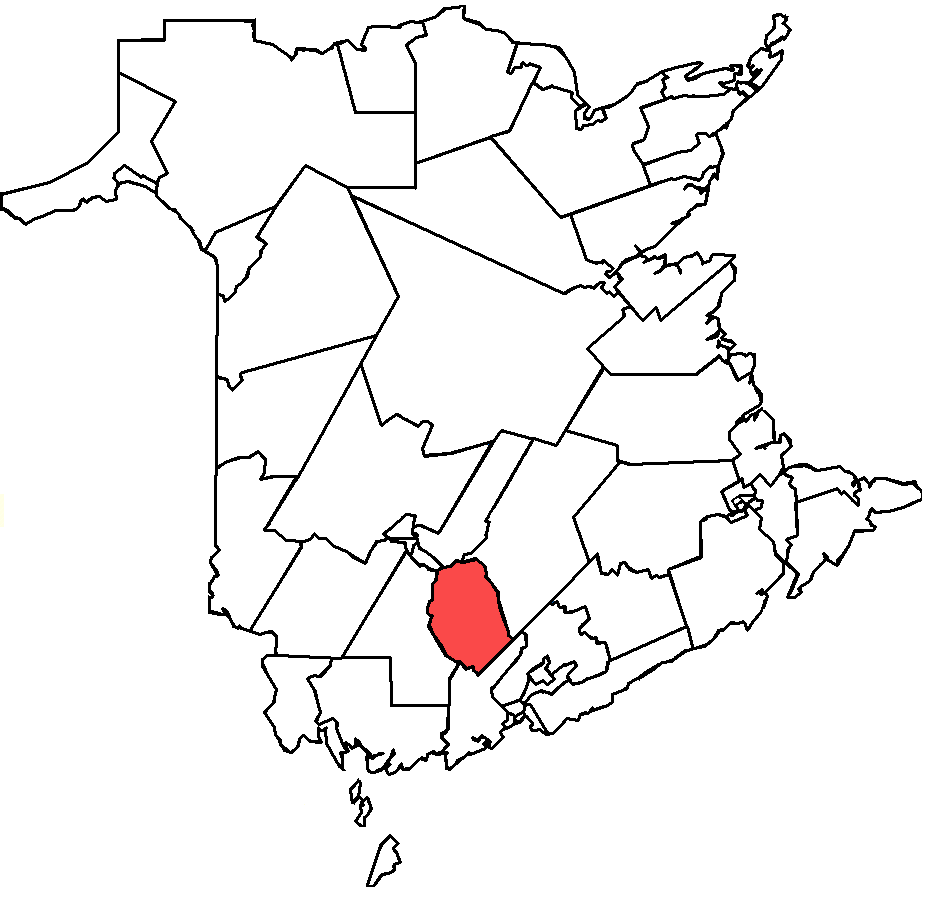
The town of Oromocto is home of the CFB Gagetown.

At the beginning of the Cold War, Canadian defence planners recognized the need for a suitable training facility where brigade and division-sized armoured, infantry, and artillery units could exercise in preparation for their role in the North Atlantic Treaty. The facility would need to be located relatively close to an all-season Atlantic port and have suitable railway connections.

Existing training facilities dating from the First and Second World Wars in eastern Canada were relatively small (Camp Debert, Camp Aldershot, Sussex Military Camp, Camp Valcartier, Camp Petawawa, Camp Utopia), thus a new facility was considered. At the same time, regional economic development planners saw an opportunity for a military base to benefit the economy of southwestern New Brunswick.

The area under consideration was an expansive plateau west of the Saint John River between the cities of Saint John and Fredericton, measuring approximately 60 km (37 mi) in length and 40 km (25 mi) in width; more accurately it runs between Oromocto in the north to Welsford in the south, and between the Saint John River in the east and the south branch of the Oromocto River in the west.

Over 900 families inhabited the area primarily engaged in agriculture and forestry. The terrain was variable, providing mixed Acadian forest, swamp and marshland, as well as open farming areas similar to the North European Plain. The influence of the St. Croix Highlands, part of the Appalachian Mountain range, creates hilly terrain and valleys in the southern and western part of the region close to the Nerepis and Oromocto rivers.

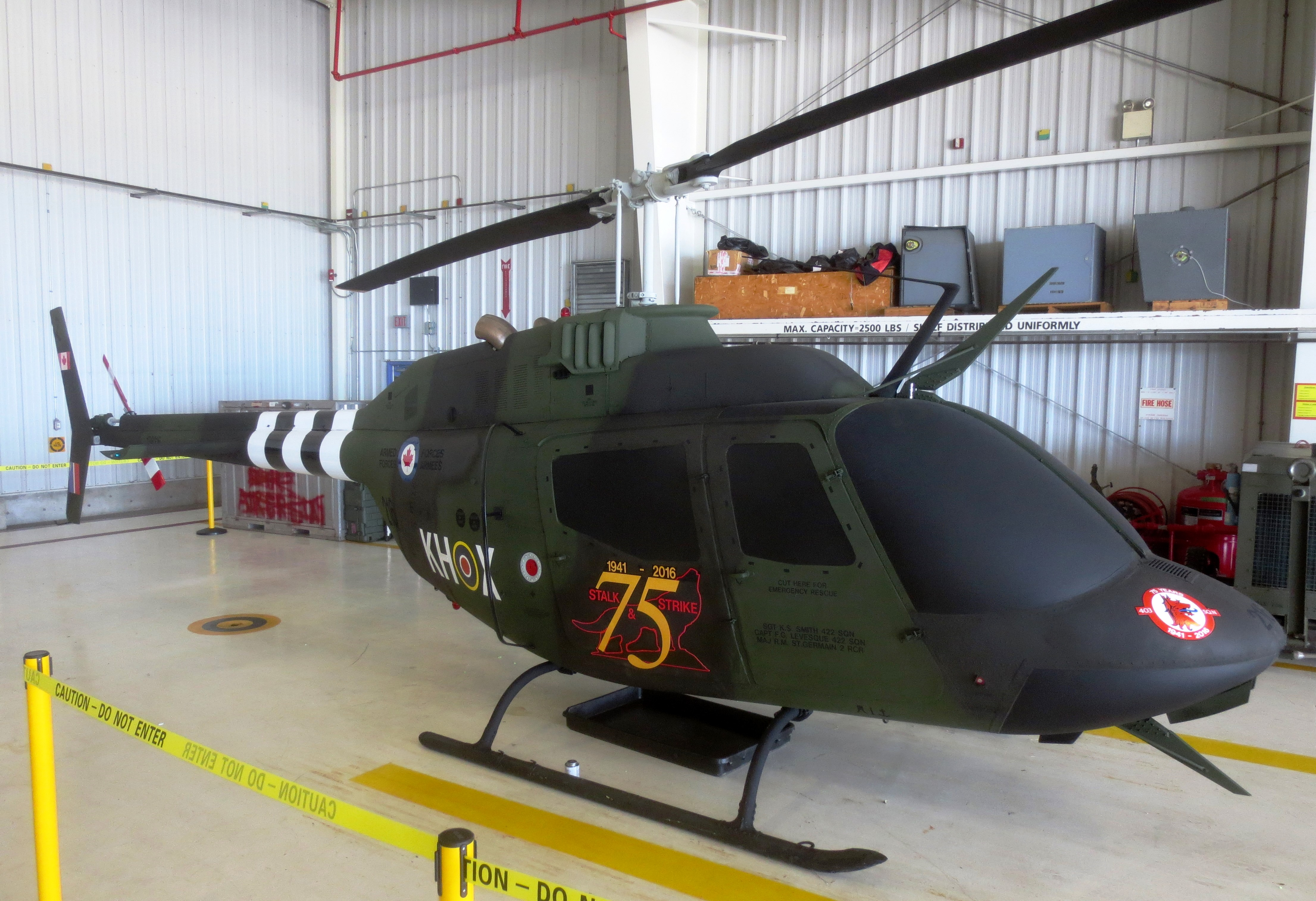
A Bell CH-136 military helicopter at CFB Gagetown

The expropriation of lands began in the early 1950s, much to the surprise of local residents who had been kept in the dark about the expropriation until the last minute. In total, between 2,000 and 3,000 residents were forced to move. An additional 44 cemeteries were within the expropriated land. The base was surveyed so as to not affect some of the historic communities along the western bank of the Saint John River such as Arcadia, Hampstead, and Browns Flat; the expropriation began several kilometres west of the river and eliminated the communities of Petersville, Hibernia, New Jerusalem, North Clones and others. This remains the largest single land expropriation in the history of New Brunswick.

The base headquarters were chosen for the northern part of the base adjacent to the (then) small village of Oromocto. In preparation for the influx of service personnel, Oromocto was redesigned as a "planned" town, with buried electrical utilities and residential and commercial clustering typical of larger planned towns such as Richmond Hill, Ontario.

Construction of the base facilities in Oromocto benefited from convenient railway connections provided by Canadian National and Canadian Pacific railways. A new alignment of the Trans-Canada Highway was built on the eastern bank of the Saint John River, opposite from Oromocto in the early 1960s (see Route 2) and a new highway bridge across the Saint John River connected the Trans-Canada Highway to the village of Burton, just south of Oromocto and near the east gate for the base.

The Gagetown Military Camp (or Camp Gagetown) opened in 1956 and was named after the village of Gagetown, although the base was located west of this historic village and was headquartered 25 km (16 mi) to its north in Oromocto. The base's territory measured 1,129 km^{2} (436 sq mi) and included numerous live-fire ranges for infantry, armoured, and artillery units, as well as aerial weapons ranges.

At the time of its opening in 1956, until the opening of Shoalwater Bay Military Training Area in Australia in 1965, Camp Gagetown was the largest military training facility in the Commonwealth of Nations. By comparison, CFB Suffield has 2,690 km^{2} (1,040 sq mi) with 2,270 km^{2} (880 sq mi) usable by the military, and 420 km^{2} (160 sq mi) designated as the Suffield National Wildlife Area.

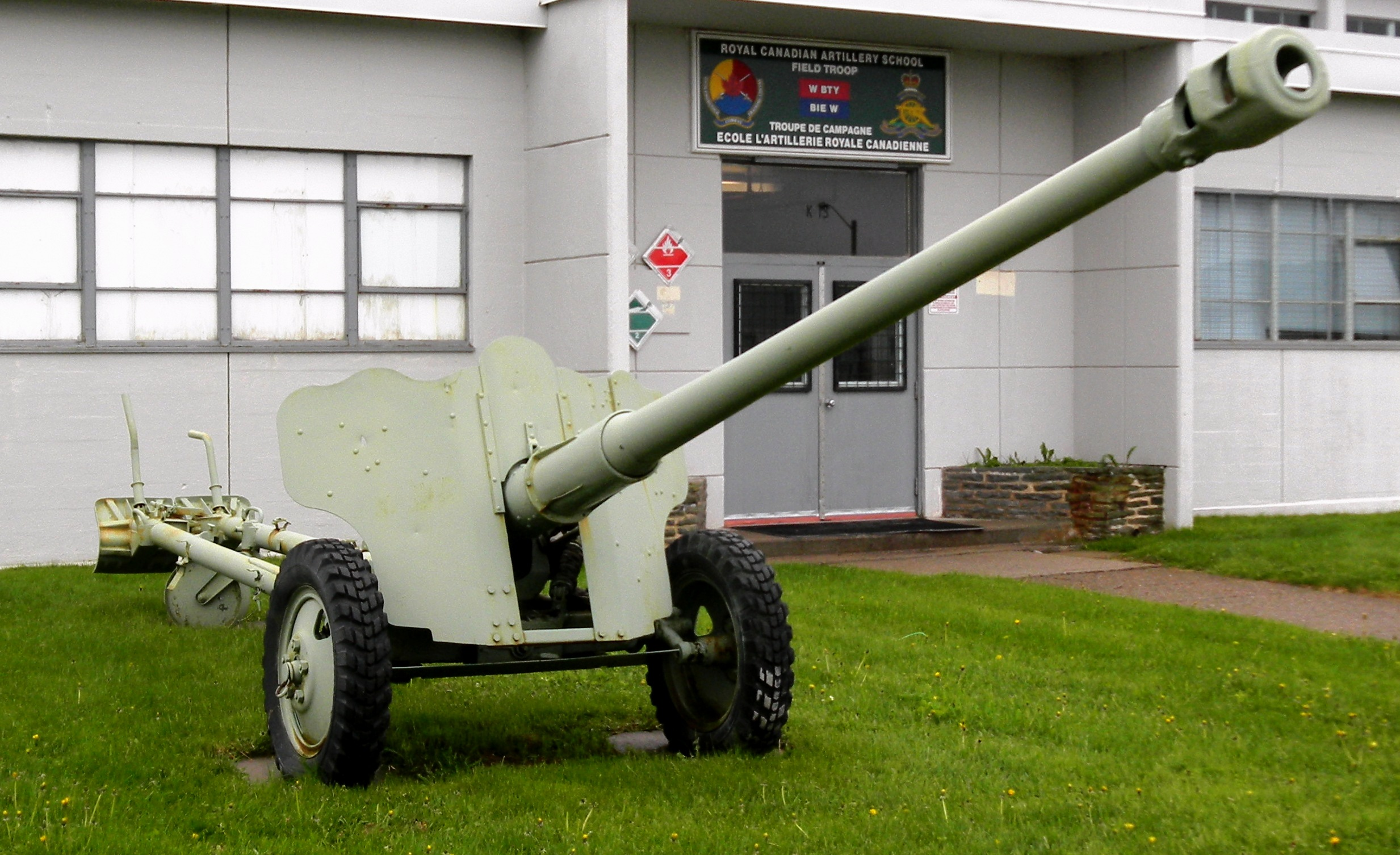
A Soviet 85 mm divisional gun D-44 outside the Royal Regiment of Canadian Artillery school at CFB Gagetown

The training area has been heavily "landscaped" over the years by military foresters and many woodlines have been sculpted to form shapes recognizable from the air, including:

- Scotty Dog Woods 45°39′18″N 066°14′07″W
- Square Woods
- Flag Woods
- The "CTC" cutting 45°43′30″N 066°11′33″W
- The "Maple Leaf" cutting 45°43′51″N 066°11′31″W

== Operations ==
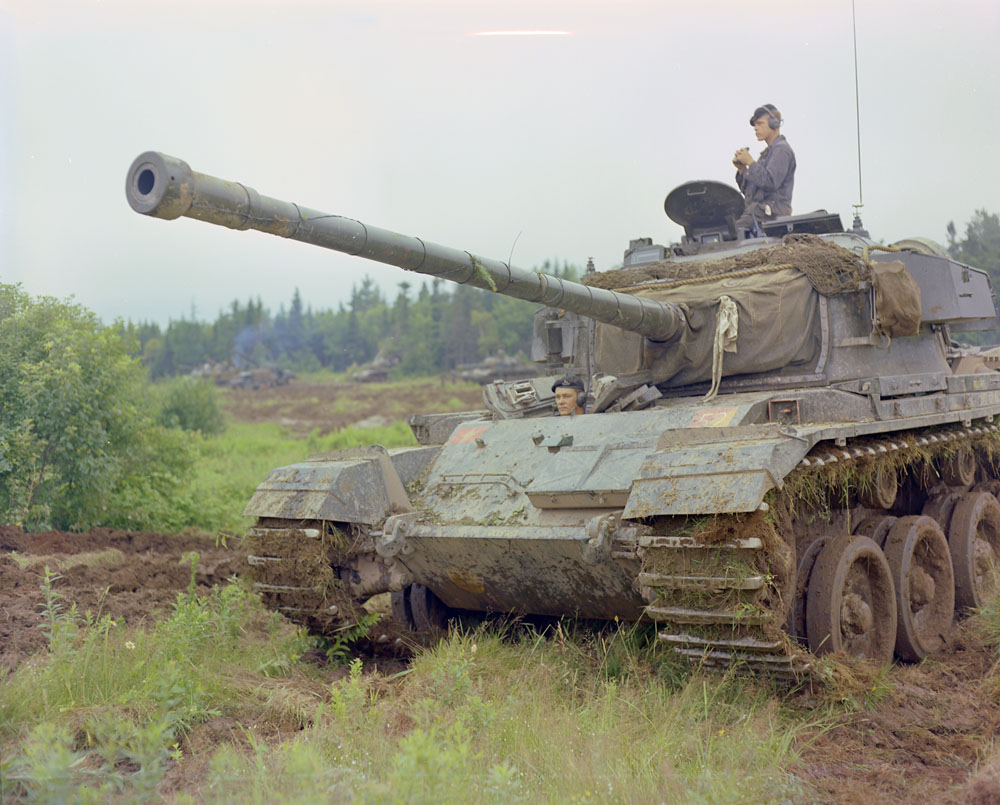
Centurion tank in Gagetown, 1963

Initially, Camp Gagetown was the home base for 3 Canadian Infantry Brigade Group and many of its regiments including The Black Watch and the 1/8th Canadian Hussars (Princess Louise's). Through this period, the role of base commander was filled by the Commander 3 CIBG, with the first incumbent being Maj Gen R.W. Moncel. By 1960, 3 CIBG had been reorganized and re-branded as 3 Canadian Mechanized Brigade Group.

In 1968, the Army, Air Force and Navy were merged to form the unified Canadian Forces and Camp Gagetown was renamed Canadian Forces Base Gagetown (CFB Gagetown). By 1969, 3 CMBG had been reorganized as 3 Combat Group and many of its Valcartier based units had been re-allocated to the new 5 Canadian Mechanized Brigade Group. At that time, the occupants of CFB Gagetown consisted of Headquarters, 3 Combat Group; 2nd Regiment, Royal Canadian Horse Artillery; The Royal Canadian Dragoons; 2 Field Squadron, Royal Canadian Engineers; 3 Signal Squadron; 1st Battalion, The Black Watch (Royal Highland Regiment) of Canada; 2nd Battalion, The Black Watch (Royal Highland Regiment) of Canada; 3 Service Battalion; and 4 Engineer Stores Depot.

In November 1969, the Commander of the Army directed the disbandment of 3 Combat Group and the formation of the Combat Training Centre in Gagetown. In May 1970, 3 CG stood down. Brigadier-General C.J.A. Hamilton, the last commander of 3 CG, handed command of CFB Gagetown to Brigadier-General Duncan McAlpine, the first commander of CTC. From that time forward, CFB Gagetown functioned as the primary combat training centre for Force Mobile Command (renamed Land Force Command in the 1990s). Combat Training Centre Gagetown (CTC Gagetown) consisted of armour, artillery, and infantry training schools. In the early 1970s, 422 and 403 helicopter squadrons were relocated to CFB Gagetown. Their helipad is located at the end of Champlain Road.

The 1980s saw numerous new training facilities built and ranges modernized, and this continued into the 1990s as the Canadian Forces closed smaller bases. A large training building housing much of CTC was opened in late 1992.

On 4 September 1992, the CTC, inclusive of CFB Gagetown, was allocated to the newly created Land Force Atlantic Area (LFAA). In the late 1990s, the Canadian Forces School of Military Engineering was relocated to CFB Gagetown from CFB Chilliwack.

In early 2000's command of CFB Gagetown shifted from being a secondary duty of the CTC Commander to being the responsibility of the commander of the newly created 3 Area Support Group. This period of time saw significant infrastructure investment at CFB Gagetown with a new 21,000 m^{2} two-building facility being opened in 2003 to replace fourteen older buildings that had been housing 2 RCR, and a new 247-room, four-floor training quarters building opening in 2006.

In 2013, the base was renamed 5th Canadian Division Support Base Gagetown (5 CDSB Gagetown) as part of a significant Canadian Army re-branding. This name change was done in parallel with the renaming of LFAA to the 5th Canadian Division, and the renaming of 3 ASG to 5th Canadian Division Support Group (5 CDSG). In June 2026, the 5th Canadian Division was stood down. In September of that year, 5 CDSG was renamed to Canadian Support Group Atlantic and transferred under the new Canadian Army Support Division. With this change, the base once again became named CFB Gagetown.

CFB Gagetown continues to function as the army's primary training facility.

== Units and formations ==
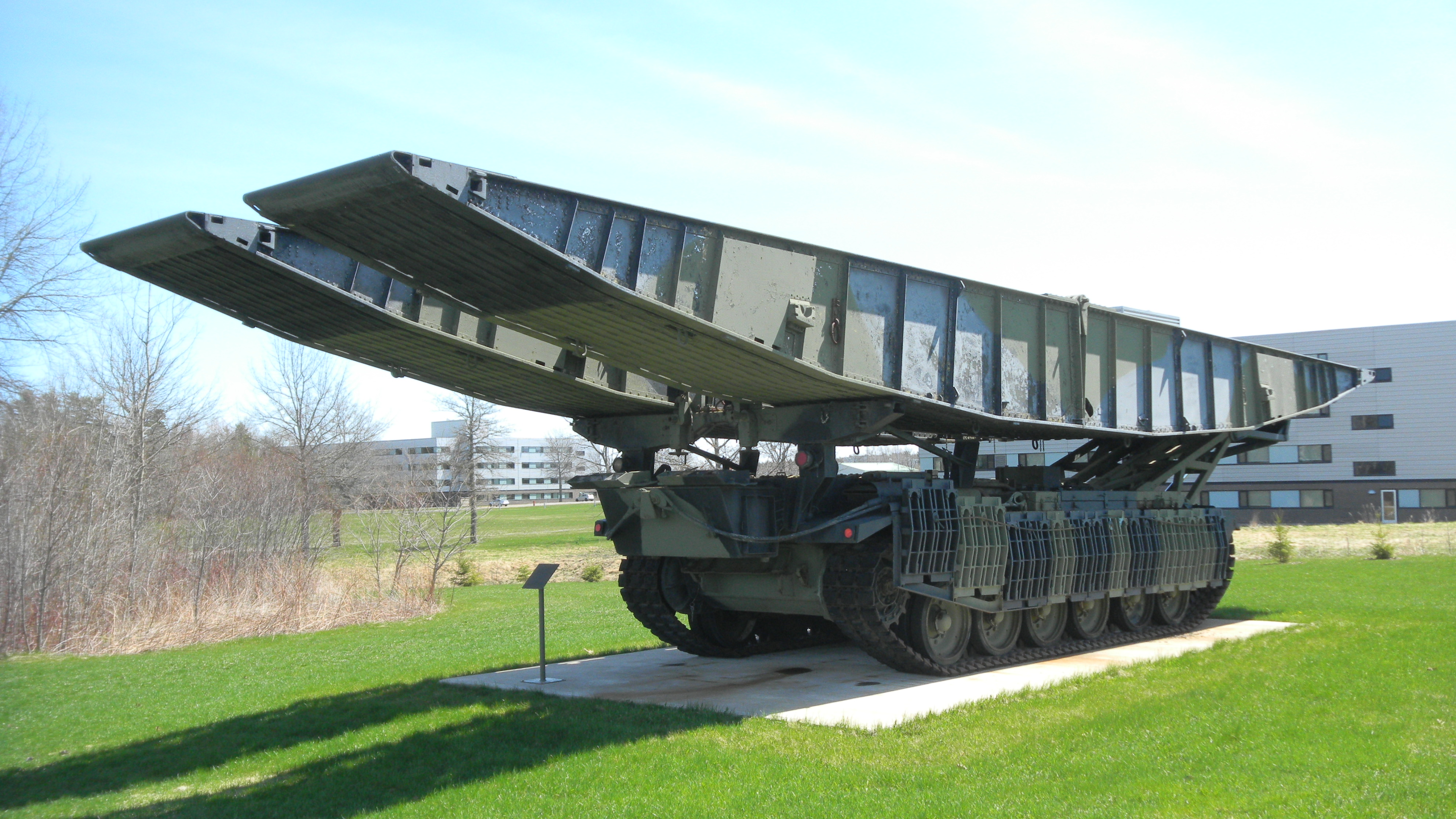
A Centurion Bridgelayer, CFB Gagetown

Principal units and formations of the CFB Gagetown are:

- 5th Canadian Division
- Combat Training Centre (Royal Canadian Armoured Corps School, Royal Canadian Artillery School, Canadian Forces School of Military Engineering, Infantry School and Tactics School)
- 5th Canadian Division Support Group
- 42 Health Services
- 1 Dental Unit Detachment Gagetown and the Joint Personnel Support Unit
- 2nd Battalion, The Royal Canadian Regiment
- 4th Artillery Regiment (General Support), RCA
- 4 Engineer Support Regiment
- 403 Helicopter Operational Training Squadron
- C Squadron, The Royal Canadian Dragoons
- Joint Meteorological Centre
- Canadian Army Trials and Evaluation Unit
- 5th Canadian Division Training Centre
- 3 Military Police Regiment Detachment Gagetown
- Argonaut Army Cadet Summer Training Centre

== Defoliant testing ==
Portions of the training area were subject to testing of defoliants during the 1960s. The use of Agent Orange and Agent Purple has led to an inquiry as to its long-term effects upon the soldiers and civilian base personnel who were exposed to it. The affected areas had soil tests that measured dioxin levels at 143 times the Canadian Council of Ministers of the Environment guidelines for maximum exposure.

== St. Mary's Chapel ==
CFB Gagetown has a chapel that is administered by the Military Ordinariate of Canada. Services at the chapel are available for all military persons and the civilian personnel of the base. During the week, the chapel organizes Mass in French and English.

== Economic facts ==
- The base and its lodger units provide full-time employment to approximately 6,500 military members and 1,000 civilians.
- The base contributes over CA$200 million to the local economy annually.
- The base contributes more than CA$700 million to the provincial economy annually.
