= Land Force Western Area =

- Active: 1 September 1991 – June 2014
- Country: Canada
- Branch: Canadian Army
- Type: Headquarters
- Part of: Canadian Army
- Garrison/HQ: CFB Edmonton
- Motto: Pace Paratus ad Arma "In peace prepared for war"
- March: "Invercargil"
- Website: www.army-armee.forces.gc.ca/en/western/index.page
- Abbreviation: LFWA

Land Force Western Area (LFWA) was a formation of the Canadian Army responsible for operations in the Canadian provinces of Manitoba, Saskatchewan, Alberta and British Columbia. LFWA was headquartered at CFB Edmonton. The command was formed in 1991. In 2013 it was announced that LFWA would be renamed 3rd Canadian Division. This change took place in the summer of 2014.

== History ==
LFWA was created on 1 September 1991, taking command of what was previously Prairie Militia Area, Pacific Militia Area, and the Regular Force Army units and formations in western Canada from the northern lakehead region of Ontario to the Pacific Ocean. At that point in time, the Militia Areas ceased to exist, and the seven subordinate Militia Districts were reorganised into four: British Columbia District, Alberta District, Saskatchewan District, and Manitoba-Lakehead District.

Later that decade, the four reserve force districts were again reorganized into three Canadian Brigade Groups.

In 2014 LFWA was renamed 3rd Canadian Division. With this change of name, the formation was also granted the identifying patch and historical lineage to the division that fought in the two world wars.

== Commanders ==
- Major-General T.F. de Faye (1991–93)
- Major-General E.S. Fitch, OMM, MSM, CD (July 1999 - July 2001)
- Brigadier-General Beare, CD (2004–2005)
- Brigadier-General Jorgensen, OMM, MSM, CD (2008 −2010)
- Brigadier-General P.F. Wynnyk, OMM, CD (2010–2012)
- Brigadier-General J.C.G. Juneau (2012–2014)

== Units ==
Land Force Western Area had four brigade groups (one Regular Force and three Reserve Force), and an Area Support Group.

There were also five units are under direct command of LFWA that did not operate under the brigade or area support groups. They were:

- Land Force Western Area Headquarters – (CFB Edmonton)
- 6 Intelligence Company
- 1 Area Construction Troop, 4 Engineer Support Regiment – (CFB Edmonton)
- 4th Canadian Ranger Patrol Group – (Group HQ in Victoria, BC. Ranger Company HQs in Victoria, Edmonton and Winnipeg, plus Junior Canadian Ranger Company HQ also in Victoria. 42 Canadian Ranger Patrols (platoon size) across the four western provinces)
- Land Force Western Area Training Centre – (CFB Wainwright)

The LFWA maintained an official military band until 1998.

=== 1 Canadian Mechanized Brigade Group ===
1 Canadian Mechanized Brigade Group was a Regular Force brigade group based out of CFB Edmonton.

1 Canadian Mechanized Brigade Group		CFB Edmonton
1 CMBG Headquarters & Signal Squadron		CFB Edmonton
1st Regiment, Royal Canadian Horse Artillery	Artillery	CFB Shilo
Lord Strathcona's Horse (Royal Canadians)	Armoured	CFB Edmonton
1 Combat Engineer Regiment	Combat engineers	CFB Edmonton
1st Battalion, Princess Patricia's Canadian Light Infantry	Mechanized infantry	CFB Edmonton
2nd Battalion, Princess Patricia's Canadian Light Infantry	Mechanized infantry	CFB Shilo
3rd Battalion, Princess Patricia's Canadian Light Infantry	Light infantry	CFB Edmonton
1 Service Battalion	Logistic Service and Support	CFB Edmonton

=== 1 Area Support Group ===
1 Area Support Group was headquartered out of CFB Edmonton. The Support Group was responsible for providing service and support to the units of Land Force Western Area.

1 Area Support Group	CFB Edmonton
1 Field Ambulance	CFB Edmonton
1 Military Police Regiment	CFB Edmonton
CFB/ASU Edmonton	
CFB/ASU Shilo	
CFB Suffield	
CFB/ASU Wainwright	
ASU Calgary	
ASU Chilliwack	

=== 38 Canadian Brigade Group ===
38 Canadian Brigade Group (38 CBG) was a Reserve Force brigade group based out of Winnipeg, Manitoba. It's composed of units in Saskatchewan, Manitoba and eastwards into Ontario to Thunder Bay, Ontario.

38 Canadian Brigade Group		Winnipeg
38 Canadian Brigade Group Headquarters		Winnipeg
The Saskatchewan Dragoons	Armoured reconnaissance	Moose Jaw
The Fort Garry Horse	Armoured reconnaissance	Winnipeg
10th Field Artillery Regiment, RCA	Artillery	Regina and Yorkton
26th Field Artillery Regiment, RCA	Artillery	Brandon and Portage la Prairie
116th Independent Field Battery, RCA	Artillery	Kenora
38 Combat Engineer Regiment	Combat engineers	Saskatoon, Winnipeg
38 Signals Regiment	Communications	Regina, Saskatoon, Winnipeg, Thunder Bay
The Royal Winnipeg Rifles	Light infantry	Winnipeg
The Lake Superior Scottish Regiment	Light infantry	Thunder Bay
The North Saskatchewan Regiment	Light infantry	Saskatoon and Prince Albert
The Royal Regina Rifles	Light infantry	Regina
The Queen's Own Cameron Highlanders of Canada	Light infantry	Winnipeg
38 Service Battalion	Service and support	Regina, Saskatoon, Winnipeg, Thunder Bay

=== 39 Canadian Brigade Group ===
39 Canadian Brigade Group (39 CBG) was a Primary Reserve brigade group based out of Vancouver, British Columbia. All of the units of the brigade are from the province of British Columbia.

39 Canadian Brigade Group		Vancouver
39 Canadian Brigade Group Headquarters		Vancouver
The British Columbia Regiment (Duke of Connaught's Own)	Armoured reconnaissance	Vancouver
The British Columbia Dragoons	Armoured reconnaissance	Kelowna and Vernon
5th (British Columbia) Field Artillery Regiment, RCA	Artillery	Victoria and Nanaimo
15th Field Artillery Regiment, RCA	Artillery	Vancouver and Aldergrove
39 Combat Engineer Regiment	Combat engineers	Vancouver, Chilliwack and Trail
39 Signal Regiment	Communications	Vancouver, Victoria and Nanaimo
The Rocky Mountain Rangers	Light infantry	Kamloops
The Royal Westminster Regiment	Light infantry	New Westminster and Aldergrove
The Seaforth Highlanders of Canada	Light infantry	Vancouver
The Canadian Scottish Regiment (Princess Mary's)	Light infantry	Victoria, Nanaimo and Comox
39 Service Battalion	Service and support	Richmond and Victoria

=== 41 Canadian Brigade Group ===
41 Canadian Brigade Group (41 CBG) was a Reserve Force brigade group based out of Calgary, Alberta. The units forming the brigade group are from the province of Alberta, as well as a company based out of Yellowknife, Northwest Territories.

41 Canadian Brigade Group		Calgary
41 Canadian Brigade Group Headquarters		Calgary
The South Alberta Light Horse	Armoured reconnaissance	Edmonton and Medicine Hat
The King's Own Calgary Regiment (RCAC)	Armoured reconnaissance	Calgary
20th Field Artillery Regiment, RCA	Artillery	Edmonton and Red Deer
20th Independent Field Battery, RCA	Artillery	Lethbridge
41 Combat Engineer Regiment	Combat engineers	Calgary and Edmonton
41 Signal Regiment	Communications	Calgary, Edmonton, and Red Deer
The Loyal Edmonton Regiment (4th Battalion, Princess Patricia's Canadian Light Infantry)	Light infantry	Edmonton and Yellowknife
The Calgary Highlanders	Light infantry	Calgary
41 Service Battalion	Service and support	Calgary and Edmonton

== Museums ==
Name	Town/City	Regions	Type	Summary
Loyal Edmonton Regiment Museum	Edmonton	Edmonton Metropolitan	Military	website, history of the Loyal Edmonton Regiment
5th (BC) Regiment Museum	Victoria	Capital	Military	website, history of coast artillery and associated units from 1861 to the present day
Canadian Scottish Regiment (Princess Mary’s) Regimental Museum	Victoria	Capital	Military	
Regimental Museum of the BC Regiment	Vancouver	Metro Vancouver	Military	History and artifacts of The British Columbia Regiment (Duke of Connaught's Own)
Royal Westminster Regiment Historical Society and Museum	New Westminster	Metro Vancouver	Military	
Seaforth Highlanders of Canada Regimental Museum and Archives	Vancouver	Metro Vancouver	Military	
12th Manitoba Dragoons Museum	Brandon	Westman	Military	website, history of the 26th Field Artillery Regiment, Royal Canadian Artillery
Royal Winnipeg Rifles Regimental Museum	Winnipeg	Winnipeg Capital	Military	website, history of the Royal Winnipeg Rifles

== Acronyms ==
- ASU: Area Support Unit
- CFB: Canadian Forces Base
- RCA: The Royal Regiment of Canadian Artillery
- RCAC: Royal Canadian Armoured Corps
