= Area Support Unit Chilliwack =

Canadian Armed Forces facility in Chilliwack, British Columbia

Coordinates: 49.101°N 121.977°W

- Active: 2 September 1997 - 31 March 2013
- Country: Canada
- Type: Area Support Unit
- Size: Approximately 80 pers
- Part of: 3rd Canadian Division 1 Area Support Group
- Garrison/HQ: Chilliwack, British Columbia
- Mottos: "Ad Mare Usque Mons" "From Sea to Mountain"
- Abbreviation: ASU Chilliwack

Area Support Unit Chilliwack (ASU Chilliwack) is a Canadian Forces facility located in Chilliwack, British Columbia.

Located in the upper valley of the Fraser River, approximately 100 km (62 mi) east of Vancouver, it is the only Land Force Command facility in the province. It provides essential support and services for 200 Regular Force and 1800 Reserve Force personnel.

== Mission ==
The mission of ASU Chilliwack is to provide direct support for all its assigned dependencies by providing logistical support and maintenance.

== Badge ==
The unit badge depicts the Rocky Mountains and the Pacific Ocean, which form the east and west boundaries of the unit's area of operations, respectively. This concept is further illustrated by the unit motto Ad Mare Usque Mons (Latin), which translates to "From Sea to Mountain".

== History ==
Military presence in the region is thought to have begun with the Royal Engineers who established a camp at Sumas near Chilliwack Mountain in 1858. From the camp, they conducted surveys and established boundary markers along the border to the south.

Camp Chilliwack was opened on 15 February 1941, as part of a government decision to establish a military training facility in the region. Initially, it served as a garrison for several army units that had been formed for terrestrial defence.

In 1966, Camp Chilliwack was renamed to Canadian Forces Base Chilliwack (CFB Chilliwack) as part of the Canadian Forces unification program. Along with the change in name, CFB Chilliwack assumed additional responsibilities, such as providing support to all of the CF units on the lower mainland and assuming responsibility for the Jericho Beach Garrison in Vancouver. In 1970, Canadian Forces Officer Candidate School was established at CFB Chilliwack and offered a tri-service Basic Officer Training Course. In 1994, the 3rd Princess Patricia's Canadian Light Infantry (3PPCLI) moved from CFB Esquimalt on Vancouver Island to CFB Chilliwack.

Due to budget cuts, CFB Chilliwack was closed in 1997 and new bases were found for the units located at the former CFB Chilliwack. The Canadian Forces Officer Candidate School was moved to St-Jean, Quebec, the Canadian Forces School of Military Engineering was moved to CFB Gagetown, New Brunswick, and 3PPCLI moved to CFB Edmonton, Alberta. Because of the closure of CFB Chilliwack, a need arose for a supporting formation to provide area-wide support for the Canadian Forces units remaining in mainland BC. In response to this need, 1 Area Support Group (1ASG) was created in 1999. On 4 February 1999, ASU Chilliwack was formed and allocated as a unit within the 1ASG.

The unit closed in March 2013 with the loss of 17 of 22 fulltime civilian posts and all 11 casual civilian posts.

== Supported Units ==
ASU Chilliwack supports the following Canadian Forces units on the British Columbia Mainland:

- 39 Canadian Brigade Group
  - The British Columbia Regiment (Duke of Connaught's Own)
  - The British Columbia Dragoons
  - 39 Combat Engineer Regiment
  - The Seaforth Highlanders of Canada
  - The Rocky Mountain Rangers
  - The Royal Westminster Regiment
  - 15th Field Regiment, Royal Canadian Artillery
  - 39 Signal Regiment
  - 39 Service Battalion
    - 12 (Vancouver) Service Company
- 6 Intelligence Company, Detachment Vancouver
- 12 Field Ambulance
- 12 Military Police Platoon
- HMCS Discovery
- 192 Construction Engineering Flight (Aldergrove)
- Canadian Forces Recruiting Centre (Vancouver)
- National Defence Quality Assurance Region (Vancouver)
- National Defence Public Affairs (Vancouver)
- University Liaison Office (Vancouver)
- Regional Cadet Support Unit (Pacific)

== Training Areas ==
ASU Chilliwack has responsibility over several military training areas. These areas are often used by Regular Force units from 1 Canadian Mechanized Brigade Group, Reserve Force units from Mainland British Columbia, some units training for deployment to Afghanistan, and as well as Cadets.

ASU Chilliwack maintains ranges and training areas for use by it dependencies, as well as visiting units.

- Vokes Range
- Slesse Creek Demolition Training Areas
- Columbia Valley Training Area
- Trail Rifle Range
- Stone Creek Training Area
- Vernon Military Camp
- OPSEE Training Area
- Chilcotin Training Area
- Vedder Mountain Training Area
- Richmond – Armoury and transmitter site
