= 1 Area Support Group =

Support formation of the Canadian Army

- Active: 1998–2013
- Country: Canada
- Branch: Canadian Army

1 Area Support Group was a formation within the Canadian Army, established in 1998 to provide logistical and administrative support to military units across Western Canada. Headquartered at Canadian Forces Base - CFB Edmonton, 1 ASG played a pivotal role in ensuring operational readiness and support for various units until its restructuring in 2013.

== Mission and responsibilities ==
1 ASG's primary mission was to deliver comprehensive support services, including:

- Logistics and Supply Chain Management: Ensuring the timely provision of equipment, supplies, and services to operational units.
- Maintenance and Technical Support: Providing repair and maintenance services for military equipment and infrastructure.
- Administrative Services: Handling personnel administration, financial services, and other essential administrative functions.
- Training Support: Facilitating training exercises and providing necessary resources and infrastructure.

== Former Constituent bases and units ==
1 Area Support Group consists of 12 bases and units:

- Canadian Forces Base Shilo, near Brandon, Man.
- Canadian Forces Base Wainwright, located 200 kilometres (120 mi) east of Edmonton, Alberta.
- Canadian Forces Base Suffield, located near Medicine Hat, Alberta.
- Canadian Forces Base Edmonton
- Area Support Unit Calgary
- Area Support Unit Chilliwack
- 1 Area Support Group Headquarters, based at CFB Edmonton
- 1 Service Battalion, based at CFB Edmonton
- 1 Military Police Unit, headquartered at CFB Edmonton
- 731 Signals Squadron, based at CFB Shilo
- 742 Signals Squadron, based at CFB Edmonton
- The Royal Canadian Artillery Band, based at CFB Edmonton

== Restructuring and transition ==
In 2013, as part of a broader reorganisation of the Canadian Army, 1 ASG was merged with Area Support Unit Edmonton to form the 3rd Canadian Division Support Group. This restructuring aimed to streamline support services and enhance operational efficiency across the division.
