= CFB Wainwright fire =

2026 disaster in Alberta, Canada

Coordinates: 52°46′33″N 110°55′27″W

2026 CFB Wainwright fire
- NASA FIRMS image of the fire.
- Date: October 17, 2026
- Location: CFB Wainwright, Alberta, Canada
- Cause: Under investigation
- Deaths: 5
- Injuries: 39

On the afternoon of October 17, 2026, a fire ignited in a training area at CFB Wainwright, a Canadian military base in Alberta, and spread rapidly beyond it. Four service members were immediately killed, and 39 others were wounded, 19 of them critically. A fifth soldier died in hospital on November 13. A National Defence official said the incident was under investigation and that there were no indications of "any terrorist activity". Family members of personnel at the base said online that it was under a communications lockdown, which a former senior military officer told CBC News was normal protocol after a major incident.

== Background ==
CFB Wainwright is a Canadian Armed Forces base adjacent to Wainwright, Alberta. It was founded in 1940. The base is one of Canada's largest and most active; it hosts the Canadian Manoeuvre Training Centre and the Army Training Centre (West) (recently known as the 3rd Canadian Division Training Centre), as well as being the training ground for Canadian Army field forces based in Edmonton. It has 1,310 soldiers stationed there. According to the 2021 census, the population of Wainwright is 6,606.

== Incident ==
At approximately 4 pm ABT on October 17, 2026, the Royal Canadian Mounted Police were called to respond to a fire at a training area within the base, which was spread by strong winds reaching up to 69 kilometres per hour (43 mph). Citing multiple unnamed military sources, Global News reported that a preliminary investigation suggested a munition from a live training exercise had sparked a fast-moving grass fire, which caused an explosion. In a press conference on October 18, Major-General Wade Rutland, commander of the 1st Canadian Division, said that the cause of the fire was not known and could not be confirmed if it was related to munitions. He also said that the fire had travelled 1 kilometre (0.62 mi) in 30 to 60 seconds, and that no explosions occurred. He added that those soldiers injured or killed were taking part in section-level attack and grenade exercises. On October 18, a government press release confirmed that the unit involved was the 3rd Battalion, Princess Patricia's Canadian Light Infantry (3PPCLI), and that the fire started during the live-fire exercise Apollo Shooter before "high wind speeds enabled the fire to grow and spread very rapidly."

The fire occurred just two days before the 2026 Alberta referendum.

== Fatalities ==
The five service members killed were identified as:

- Sergeant Morgan Wong, Loyal Edmonton Regiment, serving with 3rd Battalion, Princess Patricia's Canadian Light Infantry (3PPCLI), from Edmonton, Alberta
- Private Shaun Farrell, 3PPCLI, from Prince Albert, Saskatchewan
- Private Aidan Goulding, 3PPCLI, from North Vancouver, British Columbia
- Private Hayden Lykkemark, 3PPCLI, from Langley, British Columbia
- Private William Douglas Dal Bianco, 3PPCLI

== Emergency response ==
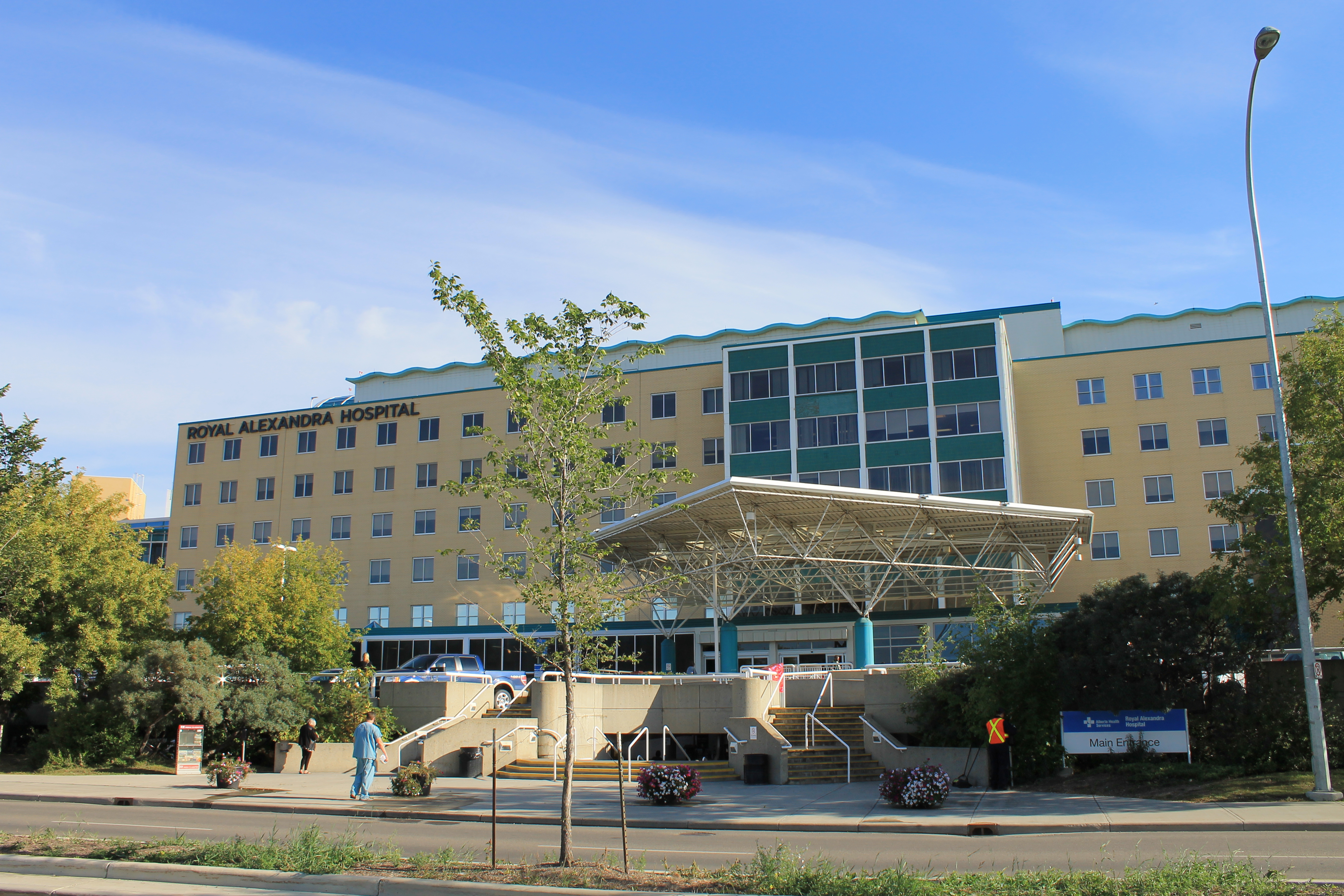
The Royal Alexandra Hospital in Edmonton, which treated victims of the fire

Minister of National Defence David McGuinty confirmed that the Canadian Armed Forces, as well as all three levels of government and other provinces were organizing support. He said that he could not "recall an incident like this in recent memory".

Initial reports by Global News and CBC News indicated that at least seven people had been killed. In a press conference held on October 18, Prime Minister Mark Carney confirmed that four service members had been killed, while dozens of others were seriously wounded. Just after 10:45 pm on October 17, the Municipal District of Wainwright said the fire was being held.

According to Dr. Warren Thirsk, an emergency department physician at the Royal Alexandra Hospital, a code orange was declared in Edmonton in response to a high number of patients being transported to the city's hospitals from Wainwright. Thirsk told CBC News that Wainwright's healthcare facilities were "completely overwhelmed" by the number of patients and that he believed the number of patients would overwhelm Edmonton. Most of the injured were transported to the Royal Alexandra Hospital and University of Alberta Hospital in Edmonton, Red Deer Regional Hospital in Red Deer, and the Foothills Medical Centre in Calgary.

At 2:15 pm on October 18, Alberta's health care authority, Acute Care Alberta (ACA), stood down all activations of code orange across the province. ACA also stated that Emergency Health Services Alberta had dispatched 30 units to Wainwright, including 22 ground ambulances, two STARS helicopters, and six fixed-wing air ambulances. Fixed-wing air ambulances included Saskatchewan Lifeguard, Alberta Central Airways (Lac La Biche and Fort McMurray), and CanWest Air (Slave Lake, Medicine Hat and Edmonton), of which some aircraft made multiple flights to and from Wainwright Municipal Airport transporting the most critical patients.

Firefighters from multiple jurisdictions responded to the fire. 11 search and rescue technicians from 435 Transport and Rescue Squadron at CFB Winnipeg were deployed to CFB Wainwright area by parachute from a CC-130H Hercules to provide assistance. This marked the largest deployment of SAR techs to an active emergency in recent memory, according to a DND spokesperson. Saskatchewan Premier Scott Moe said his province was sending assistance to Alberta.

On October 22, 33 civilian medical burn specialists from Toronto's Sunnybrook Health Sciences Centre and Hamilton Health Sciences were flown to Edmonton by an RCAF cargo aircraft to provide specialized surgical and burn care for soldiers that remain critically injured. They include 24 nurses from Sunnybrook's burn unit and 9 members of Hamilton's surgical and burn programs. The flight also transported specialised instruments and tools, as well as skin grafts.

On November 4, the Department of National Defence stated that 25 soldiers remained in hospital, four of which were flown to burn centres in British Columbia and Ontario.

On November 14, the Department of National Defence announced the death of a fifth service member, Private William Douglas Dal Bianco, who had succumbed to his injuries the previous day.

== Reactions ==
Flags at half-mast outside Mount Allison University in Sackville, New Brunswick, four days after the fire.

Prime Minister Mark Carney and provincial premier Danielle Smith expressed their condolences. Federal opposition leader and regional MP Pierre Poilievre did as well, writing "Pray for Wainwright, everyone" on social media. On October 18, Carney announced on social media that the Canadian flag would fly at half-mast on federal buildings across the country, including the Peace Tower, saying: "All Canadians stand with the service members at CFB Wainwright, their families and their community." In a statement in Ottawa later that day, he said "a violent, fast-moving fire" had swept through the base, called what followed "one of the worst tragedies for the forces on Canadian soil in peacetime", and said "the nation is in mourning for those brave members of our armed forces whom we have lost". On October 18, the Office of the Secretary to the Governor General published a statement by King Charles III, who said he and Queen Camilla were "greatly shocked and saddened to learn of the tragic incident" and expressed "deepest sympathy and heartfelt condolences" to those affected.

Governor General and Commander-in-Chief of the Canadian Armed Forces, Louise Arbour, extended her support to military members, families, and affected communities in addition to recognizing the dedication and courage of first responders through an official statement from Rideau Hall.

Former prime minister Justin Trudeau stated in a brief social media post: "My thoughts are with the Canadian Forces community, the victims, and all those impacted by yesterday's horrible tragedy at CFB Wainwright. We mourn with you."

On the evening of October 18, the National Hockey League's Calgary Flames held a moment of silence for victims of the fire prior to a home game against the Carolina Hurricanes. A moment of silence was held on October 19 before Carney's address in the House of Commons.

On November 4, a funeral service was held honouring one of the soldiers killed in the fire, Pte. Shaun Farrell.

== Investigation ==
Three separate investigations into the fire are being performed by the Canadian Forces Provost Marshal and Military Police, Alberta's chief medical examiner's office, and a Canadian Armed Forces Board of Inquiry. In a press conference on October 22, military officials including General Jennie Carignan, Chief of Defence Staff, and Major-General Rutland provided further information about the cause of the fire, while stressing that the investigation remained in the early stages. Investigators currently believe that the fire ignited on an automatic grenade launcher range, in an area known as "Permanent Danger Area 2". Due to the location of the fire, firefighters could not enter the area and suppress the fire due to the possibility of unexploded ordnance. The fire was then monitored until a sudden change of wind direction and velocity led the fire to rapidly spread. The Canadian Forces Provost Marshal, Brigadier-General Vanessa Hanrahan, said that there was no indication that oil and gas infrastructure was impacted or involved in the fire, nor was there any indication of explosions of any kind.
