= 1st Combat Engineer Regiment =

1st Combat Engineer Regiment may refer to:

- 1st Combat Engineer Regiment (Australia), a regiment of the Royal Australian Engineers.
- 1 Combat Engineer Regiment (Canada), a regiment of the Canadian Military Engineers.

== See also ==
- 1st Combat Engineer Battalion, a battalion of the United States Marine Corps.
- 1st Foreign Engineer Regiment, a regiment of the French Foreign Legion.
