= 1 Service Battalion =

- 1^{er} Bataillon des services (French)
- Battalion badge
- Active: 1 September 1968–present
- Country: Canada
- Branch: Canadian Army
- Role: Combat service support
- Size: One battalion of four companies
- Part of: 1 Canadian Mechanized Brigade Group
- Garrison/HQ: CFB Edmonton
- Motto: Officium super omnia (Latin for 'duty above all')
- Colors: Marine Corps scarlet, oriental blue, gold
- March: "Duty Above All"
- Website: www.canada.ca/en/army/corporate/3-canadian-division/1-service-battalion.html

Commanders
- Commanding officer: LCol James Legendre
- Regimental sergeant major: CWO Patrick (Pat) Lebel

Insignia
- Abbreviation: 1 Svc Bn / 1 B^{on} Svc

1 Service Battalion (1 Svc Bn; French: 1^{er} Bataillon des services) is a deployable field unit of the Canadian Forces. It provides second- and limited third-line combat service support to units throughout the 3rd Canadian Division. Located at Steele Barracks, Canadian Forces Base Edmonton, 1 Svc Bn is composed of the battalion headquarters and four functional companies: Transportation, Supply, Maintenance, and Administration. Administration Company is distinct in that it provides first-line support to the battalion itself, while the remaining companies provide second- and limited third-line support to units across the 3rd Canadian Division.

The battalion is composed of an integrated and cohesive team of active military members and public servants. Soldiers must maintain their soldiering and war-fighting skills to a high degree of proficiency, while concurrently developing expertise in their respective trades.

The battalion's primary focus is on conducting and training for operations; however, the unit also provides combat service support on a daily basis to 1 Canadian Mechanized Brigade Group and the 3rd Canadian Division. 1 Svc Bn has, from 1990 to 2010, regularly generated, trained, and deployed the National Support Element (NSE) for several Canadian deployments.

The unit motto is officium super omnia which translates to "duty above all". The current commanding officer is Lieutenant-Colonel James Legendre and the regimental sergeant major is Chief Warrant Officer Patrick (Pat) Lebel.

== History ==
1 Service Battalion (1 Svc Bn) was officially formed on 1 September 1968, however, the unit's roots can be traced back to around the start of the 20th century through the history of its functional companies: Transportation, Supply and Maintenance. These three companies are descendants of the Royal Canadian Army Service Corps (RCASC), the Royal Canadian Ordnance Corps (RCOC), and the Royal Canadian Electrical and Mechanical Engineers (RCEME) respectively.

=== Royal Canadian Army Service Corps ===
Until the formation of the service battalions in September 1968, all transportation service was provided by the Royal Canadian Army Service Corps (RCASC). The RCASC was established, by General Order No. 141, as the Canadian Army Service Corps (CASC), on 1 November 1901. The CASC was modelled directly off the British Army Service Corps to provide all transportation and supply services to the Army. Initially, the CASC consisted of four companies to support the Active Militia units. The Corps grew quickly, doubling the number of units by 1903, and growing by another three companies by 1905. By the summer of 1914 the CASC had a strength of 3000 personnel in eighteen companies.

During World War I, the CASC provided a support element for each Canadian division, and later on, for the Canadian Corps. With the introduction of motorized vehicles, the CASC carried commodities of a greater range and of greater weights. Motorized transportation also resulted in expanded responsibilities such as driving ambulances and engineer pontoon vehicles, carrying all natures of ammunition, and mobile repair and recovery. In recognition of the services rendered during World War I, King George V authorized the designator "Royal" in 1919.

The RCASC, along with the rest of the army, underwent a rapid expansion as Canada mobilized for the Second World War. The RCASC provided support to Canadian soldiers wherever they went; training in Canada and Great Britain, the campaign in north-west Europe, and in the campaign in Italy. The RCASC moved supplies from the rear areas to the front-lines. They delivered all rations, ammunition, petroleum products, and all other essentials. They did so with a variety of vehicles ranging from 3- to 10-ton trucks, and 40-ton tank transporters.

During the 1950s, the RCASC committed No. 1 and No. 2 Movement Control Groups, 54 Canadian Transport Company, 28 Motorized Ambulance Company, and 58 General Transport Company to the Korean War. In 1952, 23 Transport Company relieved 54 Transport Company, which was in-turn relieved by 56 Transport Company. 3 Transport Company was the last to serve in Korea in 1954. 4 Transport Company (previously known as 56 Transport Company and then 5 Transport Company) moved from Winnipeg to Calgary in August 1967. In June 1968, 4 Transport Company combined with elements of the static 13 Transport Company. Three months later that organization became the Transport Company of 1 Svc Bn.

=== Royal Canadian Ordnance Corps ===
The Royal Canadian Ordnance Corps (RCOC) can trace its roots back to the Canadian Stores Department. Formed in 1871, the Canadian Stores Department was a civil department of the Canadian Government. This civil service was charged with control of forts, ammunition, stores, buildings and an ordnance depot left by the departing British Military. On 1 July 1903, the responsibilities of the Canadian Stores Department were transferred to the Ordnance Stores Corps. In 1907 it was renamed the Canadian Ordnance Corps (COC).

During the First World War, the COC, in conjunction with the CASC, was supporting 400,000 men, 150,000 French civilians, and 25,000 horses. In 1919, for recognition of outstanding service during the War, King George V authorized the "Royal" designation.

In the Second World War, the RCOC had a strength of 35,000 military personnel, not including the thousands of civilian personnel employed at RCOC installations. They procured all the material goods required by the Army, from clothing to weapons. Up until 1944, the RCOC was responsible for maintenance and repair. Ordnance Field Parks, that carried everything from spare parts to spare artillery, supported the Divisions and Corps.

In 1960, 1 Ordnance Field Park moved from Edmonton to Calgary and in 1968 merged with the Base Supply organization to become the Supply Company of 1 Svc Bn.

=== Royal Canadian Electrical and Mechanical Engineers ===
The Corps of RCEME was formed on 15 May 1944 as an amalgamation of elements of the RCOC, the RCASC, and the Royal Canadian Engineers. It was modelled after the British Royal Electrical and Mechanical Engineers (REME). It was born out of lessons learned during the Second World War. It became apparent that due to the increasing complexity of military equipment, technical expertise needed to be pooled to be most effective.

After the Second World War, the RCEME contributed units to Canadian commitments overseas. RCEME units that served in the Korean War included No. 25 Canadian Support Workshop, No. 191 Canadian Infantry Workshop, No. 23 Infantry Workshop (renamed No. 40 Infantry Workshop), and No. 42 Infantry Workshop.

No. 43 Infantry Workshop, which had gone to Germany as No. 195 Workshop, returned from service in Germany to Barriefield in 1955. In 1958, the unit was re-designated again as 1 Field Workshop. In mid-1958, the unit was moved to Calgary to support 1 Canadian Infantry Brigade Group. In September 1968, No. 1 Field Workshop merged with No. 215 Workshop and became Maintenance Company, 1 Svc Bn.

=== Formation to present day ===
As previously mentioned, the unit was officially stood up 1 September 1968. Initially, it was composed of a small headquarters, Transport Company, Supply Company, Maintenance Company, Construction Engineer Company, and Military Police Platoon. The battalion's tasks were: to deploy as a service support unit on order; to assist Canadian Forces Base Calgary with the provision of administrative support to local units; and, to provide a field logistics capability to support 1 Canadian Infantry Brigade Group. In 1975, the Military Police Platoon was removed from the organization to become 1 MP Platoon, and the Construction Engineer Company left and became part of CFB Calgary's Technical Services Branch. In 1976, the Administration Company was added to provide integral service support to the unit so that the unit could better concentrate on providing close and general support to the brigade group. The Administration Company consisted of the unit's headquarters, Transport Platoon, Supply Platoon, and Maintenance Platoon, as well as messing, personnel administration, and medical services.

In late 1978 and early 1979, a band was formed and took part in its initial training phase during rehearsals at a shack in Sarcee Barracks. Unlike others at the time, it was an unauthorized Canadian military band. Each member was issued band heraldry in the spring of the year and consisted of the following musicians at that time: the band sergeant, a band administration officer, a drum major, four snare drummers, two side drummers, a bass drummer, three glockenspiel players, three buglers, and two baritone buglers.

On 24 April 1982, in recognition of its support to and close association with the City of Calgary, 1 Svc Bn was awarded the freedom of the city. As part of the ceremony, the battalion marched to Calgary City Hall where Mayor (and later Alberta Premier) Ralph Klein presented the honour.

As a result of the government's decision to close CFB Calgary, 1 Svc Bn moved to Steele Barracks in Edmonton on 23 September 1996. In July 1999, as part of the army's combat service support core restructure, part of the battalion was removed to form 1 General Support Battalion (1 GS Bn). This relieved 1 Svc Bn of its static or base responsibilities. The smaller unit was then composed of Administration Company, Maintenance Company, and Supply and Transportation Company.

On 28 June 2003, the City of Spruce Grove granted 1 Svc Bn freedom of the city. The honour was marked with a parade through the city and several static displays of vehicles and equipment.

On 6 February 2006, 1 Svc Bn and 1 GS Bn were reunited as a single unit, 1 Svc Bn. On 3 April of the same year, 1 Svc Bn was transferred from 1 Canadian Mechanized Brigade Group to 1 Area Support Group.

On 11 September 2011, the Town of Morinville granted 1 Svc Bn freedom of the city. The honour was marked with a parade through the city and several static displays of vehicles and equipment.

On 23 April 2012, 1 Svc Bn returned to the command of 1 Canadian Mechanized Brigade Group in accordance with the Canadian Forces Force 2013 laydown. The event was marked with a transfer of command authority parade to formalize the transfer.

=== Current order of battle ===
The Unit Headquarters is responsible for command and control of the unit, planning and coordinating support operations and training, issuing direction to the companies, and maintaining liaison with supported and supporting organizations. The unit headquarters includes the Operations Cell, Training Cell, Battalion Orderly Room, and the command team of the commanding officer, the regimental sergeant major, the deputy commanding officer, the adjutant and the battalion administration coordinator.

Transportation Company is responsible to provide second- and limited third-line transport and movements support. The second-largest company, it is organized into four platoons: Headquarters Platoon, Field Platoon, C Platoon, and Movements and Postal Platoon. Support tasks executed by the company include the provision of the general cargo and personal transport, refuelling services, snow and ice control operations at CFB Edmonton, multi-modal movements planning and control, aerial resupply and postal services. Additionally, the company provides specialist transportation-related training and manages the conduct of the Canadian Forces Mobile Support Equipment Safety Program in the Edmonton Garrison.

Supply Company is the third-largest company in the battalion. The company is organized with a headquarters and five platoons: the Systems Control Platoon, Stocks Platoon, Garrison Support Services Platoon, Laundry, Bath, and Decontamination Platoon, and Combat Supply Platoon. Supply Company provides a variety of essential stores and services to supported units both in garrison and while on deployed operations. The current Supply Company facility, located within the Edmonton Garrison, was originally conceived and designed in 1996 by officer commanding Supply Company Captain Stewart Campbell.

Maintenance Company is the largest of the companies in the battalion. The company provides second- and limited third-line repair and recovery services to assigned dependencies both in garrison and on deployments, as well as providing integral-level support to specified units that do not possess their own integral Land Equipment Management System resources. Maintenance Company consists of the Headquarters, Vehicle Platoon, Artisan Platoon, and Garrison Maintenance Platoon.

Administration Company is the smallest in the battalion and is composed of the Headquarters Platoon, Maintenance Platoon, Transport Platoon, Quartermaster Platoon, Signals Troop, and Finance Platoon. The role of Administration Company is to provide efficient and effective first-line support to the other companies of 1 Svc Bn and any external elements that are attached to the unit. This includes the provision of transportation, maintenance, supply, signals, administrative, and food services support that the members of the other companies need in order to successfully carry out their assigned tasks.

== Deployed operations ==
=== International ===
- Operation Unifier – Ukraine (2015–present)
- Operation Impact – Middle East (2014–present)
- Operation Reassurance – Poland/Latvia (2014–present)
- Operation Attention – Afghanistan (2011–2014)
- Operation Archer – Afghanistan (2005–2013)
- Operation Athena – Afghanistan (2005–2011)
- Operation Apollo – Afghanistan (2001–2003)
- Operation Kinetic – Macedonia (1999–2000)
- Operation Palladium – Bosnia (1995–2004)
- Operation Mandarin – Croatia (1994)
- Operation Harmony – Croatia (1992–1995)
- Operation Marquis – Cambodia (1992–1993)
- Operation Matador – Namibia (1988–1989)
- Operation Danaca – Middle East (1974–2006)
- Operation Snowgoose – Cyprus (1964–1993)

=== Domestic ===
- Operation Lentus 18 – British Columbia forest fires (July–September 2018)
- Operation Lentus 17 – British Columbia forest fires (July 2017)
- Operation Lentus 15 – Saskatchewan fire (July 2015)
- Operation Lentus 14 – Manitoba floods (July 2014)
- Operation Lentus 13 – southern Alberta floods (June 2013)
- Operation Lustre – Manitoba floods (May 2011)
- Operation Podium – Winter Olympic Games in Vancouver, B.C. (winter 2010)
- Operation Grizzly – G8 Leaders Summit in Kananaskis, Alberta (summer 2002)
- Operation Peregrine – military support for fighting forest fires in BC (2003)
- Operation Recuperation – ice storm relief in eastern Canada ( January–February 1998)
- APEC Economic Leaders' Meeting – Vancouver, B.C. (November 1997)
- Operation Assistance – Manitoba flood response ( April–May 1997)
- Winter Olympic Games – Calgary, Alberta (1988)
- Operation Gamescan – Summer Olympic Games in Montreal, Quebec (1976)

== Commanding officers ==
- Lieutenant-Colonel B.B. Cox, CD – September 1968 – August 1969
- Lieutenant-Colonel D.V. Geary, CD – August 1969 – July 1971
- Lieutenant-Colonel C.A. Millar, CD – July 1971 – July 1973
- Lieutenant-Colonel R.D. Leech, CD – July 1973 – April 1975
- Lieutenant-Colonel P.P. Pospisil, CD – April 1975 – May 1977
- Lieutenant-Colonel R.G. Dauphinee, CD May 1977 – June 1979
- Lieutenant-Colonel D.N. Basinger, CD – June 1979 – July 1981
- Lieutenant-Colonel R.T. Baxter, CD – July 1981 – July 1983
- Lieutenant-Colonel I.J. Campbell, OMM, CD – July 1983 – July 1985
- Lieutenant-Colonel H.L. Corbett, OMM, CD – July 1985 – July 1987
- Lieutenant-Colonel G.A. Walsh, CD – July 1987 – July 1989
- Lieutenant-Colonel E.K. Beselt, CD – July 1989 – June 1991
- Lieutenant-Colonel K.A. Strain, CD – June 1991 – July 1993
- Lieutenant-Colonel J.L.S. Hamel, CD – July 1993 – June 1995
- Lieutenant-Colonel D.N. Redman, CD – June 1995 – April 1997
- Lieutenant-Colonel M.E. McQuillan, OMM, CD, PEng – April 1997 – June 1999
- Lieutenant-Colonel A.C. Patch, OMM, CD – June 1999 – June 2001
- Lieutenant-Colonel J.R. Peverley, CD – June 2001 – July 2003
- Lieutenant-Colonel C.A. Lamarre, CMM, MSC, CD – July 2003 – June 2005
- Lieutenant-Colonel J.D. Conrad, MSM, CD – June 2005 – Feb 2006
- Lieutenant-Colonel D.C. Bell, CD – Feb 2006 – July 2006
- Lieutenant-Colonel K.W. Horlock, OMM, MSM, CD – July 2006 – June 2007
- Lieutenant-Colonel B.J. MacGillivray, CD – June 2007 – June 2009
- Lieutenant-Colonel R.B. Dundon, CD – June 2009 – April 2011
- Lieutenant-Colonel K.D. Brodie, CD – April 2011 – June 2013
- Lieutenant-Colonel J.P.S. McKenzie, CD – June 2013 – June 2015
- Lieutenant-Colonel B.D. Davidson, CD – June 2015 – June 2017
- Lieutenant-Colonel H.S. Morrison, CD – June 2017 – July 2019
- Lieutenant-Colonel G.M. Grenier-Lachance, CD – July 2019 – May 2021
- Lieutenant-Colonel J.L. Boland, CD - May 2021 – June 2023
- Lieutenant-Colonel C.R. Read, CD - June 2023 – Present

== Regimental sergeants major ==
- Chief Warrant Officer F. Maiden, CD – September 1968 – February 1969
- Chief Warrant Officer C.E. Short, CD – February 1969 – May 1974
- Chief Warrant Officer R.F. Wallace, CD – July 1974 – July 1975
- Chief Warrant Officer G.E. Welsh, CD – July 1975 – July 1978
- Chief Warrant Officer G.L. Pelletier, CD – August 1978 – August 1980
- Chief Warrant Officer G.P. Martin, CD – August 1980 – July 1983
- Chief Warrant Officer H.C. Moore, MMM, CD – August 1983 – June 1986
- Chief Warrant Officer K.T. Morrison, MMM, CD – June 1986 – July 1988
- Chief Warrant Officer G.D. Fehr, MMM, CD – August 1988 – June 1991
- Chief Warrant Officer R.V. Seyffert, CD – June 1991 – July 1994
- Chief Warrant Officer P.B. Gilby, CD – April 1994 – April 1997
- Chief Warrant Officer G.M. Clough, MMM, CD – April 1997 – July 2000
- Chief Warrant Officer D.B. Chipman, MMM, CD – July 2000 – July 2002
- Chief Warrant Officer G.W. Morrison, MMM, CD – July 2002 – June 2005
- Chief Warrant Officer P.J. Earles, MSM, CD – June 2005 – February 2006
- Chief Warrant Officer R.J. Daly, MSM, CD – February 2006 – June 2007
- Chief Warrant Officer G.A. Hughes, MMM, CD – June 2007 – June 2009
- Chief Warrant Officer G.R. Vey, MMM, CD – June 2009 – July 2012
- Chief Warrant Officer T.J. Harrison, CD – July 2012 – June 2015
- Chief Warrant Officer W.J. Bantock, MMM, CD – June 2015 – July 2018
- Chief Warrant Officer S.R. Wilson, MMM, CD – July 2018 - May 2021
- Chief Warrant Officer G. Page, MMM, CD - May 2021 – Present

== Unit flag ==
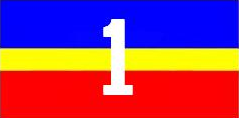
The 1 Service Battalion flag.

The 1 Svc Bn Unit flag has links with the traditions of the founding corps. The official colours of the unit flag are Marine Corps scarlet and oriental blue with an intervening gold stripe and the number one emblazoned in the centre. These colours have a history of association with army services. The oriental blue colour of the flag is reminiscent of the old RCOC flag while the gold colour can be found on the former banners of the RCASC, the RCEME Corps, and the Royal Canadian Army Pays Corps (RCAPC).

== Unit badge ==
The badge of 1 Svc Bn (seen above) was selected after many years of discussion in 1978. The badge depicts a Dall ram's head against the battalion flag oriented diagonally inside a ceremonial Canadian Forces unit badge. The Dall sheep is indigenous to Alberta and it was selected to represent the "Army of the West" many years ago by Major-General F.F. Worthington.

== Unit building ==
On 15 November 2017, 1 Service Battalion finalized the exterior naming of building 179 with "Édifice Bell/Slumkofske Building". The building is named after two distinguished soldiers: Colonel Bell was a logistician of the First World War and Sergeant Lawrence Albert Slumkofske a RCEME soldier who served in the Second World War.

The official naming of building 179 occurred with the unveiling of a dedication plate in the foyer of the building on 20 October 1996 by Major-General M.D. Jeffries CD.
