= 408 Tactical Helicopter Squadron =

Canadian military flying unit

- 408^{e} Escadron tactique d'hélicoptères
- Active: 1941–1945, 1949–present
- Country: Canada
- Branch: Royal Canadian Air Force
- Role: Tactical helicopters
- Part of: 1 Wing Kingston
- Garrison/HQ: CFB Edmonton
- Motto: For freedom
- Mascot: Canada Goose
- Battle honours: English Channel and North Sea, 1941–1943; Baltic, 1941–1943; Fortress Europe, 1941–1944; France and Germany, 1944–1945; Biscay Ports, 1941–1944; Ruhr, 1941–1945; Berlin, 1943–1944; German Ports, 1941–1945; Normandy, 1944; Rhine; Biscay, 1942–1943; Afghanistan
- Website: canada.ca/en/air-force/corporate/squadrons/408-squadron.html

Insignia
- Identification symbol: Canada goose in profile

Aircraft flown
- Transport: CH-146 Griffon

408 Tactical Helicopter Squadron (408 THS) (French: 408^{e} Escadron tactique d'hélicoptères) is a unit of 1 Wing, Kingston. It is co-located with 1 Canadian Mechanized Brigade Group at Canadian Forces Base (CFB) Edmonton.

Equipped with 16 CH-146 Griffon helicopters, it rotates a high combat-readiness level with 400 Squadron (CFB Borden, Ontario) and 430 Squadron (CFB Valcartier, Quebec). Its primary role is in support of contingency operations and vanguard brigades requiring tactical helicopter resources.

No. 408 Squadron's mandate also includes supporting United Nations and NATO peacekeeping operations, land force training, and support to other government departments. For example, 408 Squadron's eight Griffons were assigned to support the Canadian contingent in the Balkans in 1999. Their job was to ferry small teams of paratroopers, infantrymen, and tankers to certain areas to check out water reservoirs, power grids, suspected weapons caches, minefields, and mass grave sites.

== History ==
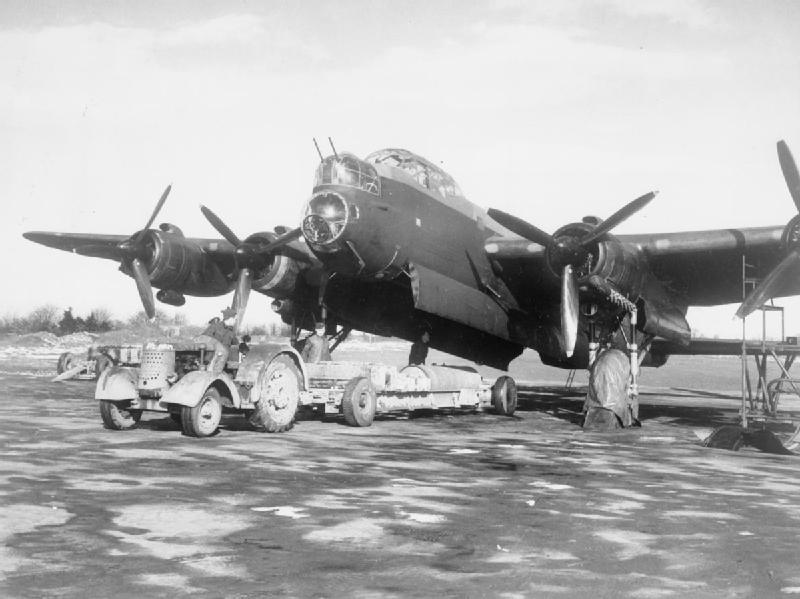
Bombing up a 408 Squadron Lancaster Mk II at RAF Linton-on-Ouse, England

No. 408 Squadron's history dates back to 24 June 1941, when RAF Bomber Command's directive called for the formation of 408 Squadron as part of No. 5 Group RAF. It was to be the second Royal Canadian Air Force (RCAF) bomber squadron formed overseas. Goose Squadron, as it was to become known, was initially based at RAF Lindholme in Yorkshire, England, and equipped with Handley Page Hampdens. During the war, the Goose Squadron converted aircraft several times. No 408 would change from Hampden aircraft to the Halifax, and then to the Lancaster in August 1943 after moving to RAF Linton-on-Ouse and becoming part of No. 6 Group.

It flew 4,610 sorties and dropped 11,340 tons of bombs. A total of 170 aircraft were lost and 933 personnel were killed, listed as missing in action (MIA) or prisoners of war (POW). Squadron members won two hundred decorations, and 11 battle honours for its wartime operations.

On 5 September 1945 No 408 Squadron was officially disbanded.

On 10 January 1949, Goose Squadron was reformed at RCAF Station Rockcliffe, Ontario. Equipped with eight Lancaster Mark X photographic aircraft, it was tasked with the mapping of Canada, specifically the far North. In 1962, the squadron formed a flight of Canadair CT-133 Silver Star aircraft and was given the additional task of photo reconnaissance missions in support of army exercises.

On 29 February 1964, the Lancaster aircraft were retired and replaced with Dakotas. The Goose Squadron was moved to Rivers, Manitoba, and re-designated as a transport support and area reconnaissance squadron.

On 1 May 1964, RCAF Station Rivers Transport Support Flight with its C-119 Boxcars was transferred into 408 Squadron. In 1965, the Boxcars were replaced by CC-130 Hercules aircraft. As the decade drew to a close, 408 Squadron was once again redesignated. On 1 October 1968, it started its long history with 10 Tactical Air Group as a "Tactical Fighter Squadron".

During this post-war era, the squadron flew seven different aircraft: the Lancaster, Cansos, Norseman, Dakotas, Boxcars, T-33s, and Hercules aircraft. Late in 1970, the squadron was once more disbanded.

On 1 January 1971, 408 Squadron was once again re-activated at Namao in Edmonton, Alberta, as a tactical helicopter squadron (THS) and equipped with CH-135 Twin Huey and CH-136 Kiowa helicopters.

Its primary tasking is to provide tactical aviation to the army. The mission includes air mobile assault, air ambulance, air observation, reconnaissance insertions, troop movement, airborne command and control platform and dropping paratroopers. In September 1996, the squadron was re-equipped with CH-146 Griffon helicopters.

Personnel from 408 Squadron deployed to Afghanistan nearly continually from 2006 until 2011. Initially forming a Tactical Unmanned Aerial Vehicle (TUAV) detachment using the CU-161 Sperwer. From 2008, 408 members were deployed to Kandahar airfield operating the CH-146 Griffon and CH-147D helicopters as part of the Joint Task Force Afghanistan Air Wing. The primary role of the JTF-A Air Wing was to provide transportation, reconnaissance, armed escort, and fire support to the International Security Assistance Force (ISAF).

In July 2018, 408 THS deployed to Mali as part of Task Force Mali on Operation Presence. In Mali, 408 THS operated the CH-146 Griffon in the armed escort role, providing support to MEDEVAC and utility missions. 408 THS completed its tour in Mali in January 2019, having participated in seven medical evacuation missions

== Aircraft ==
- Handley Page Hampden
- Handley Page Halifax B Mk II, III, V, VII
- Avro Lancaster Mk II, X
- Consolidated PBY Canso
- Noorduyn Norseman
- Canadair CT-133 Silver Star
- Douglas Dakota
- Fairchild C-119 Boxcar
- Lockheed CC-130 Hercules
- Bell CH-135 Twin Huey
- Bell CH-136 Kiowa
- Bell CH-146 Griffon

== Images ==
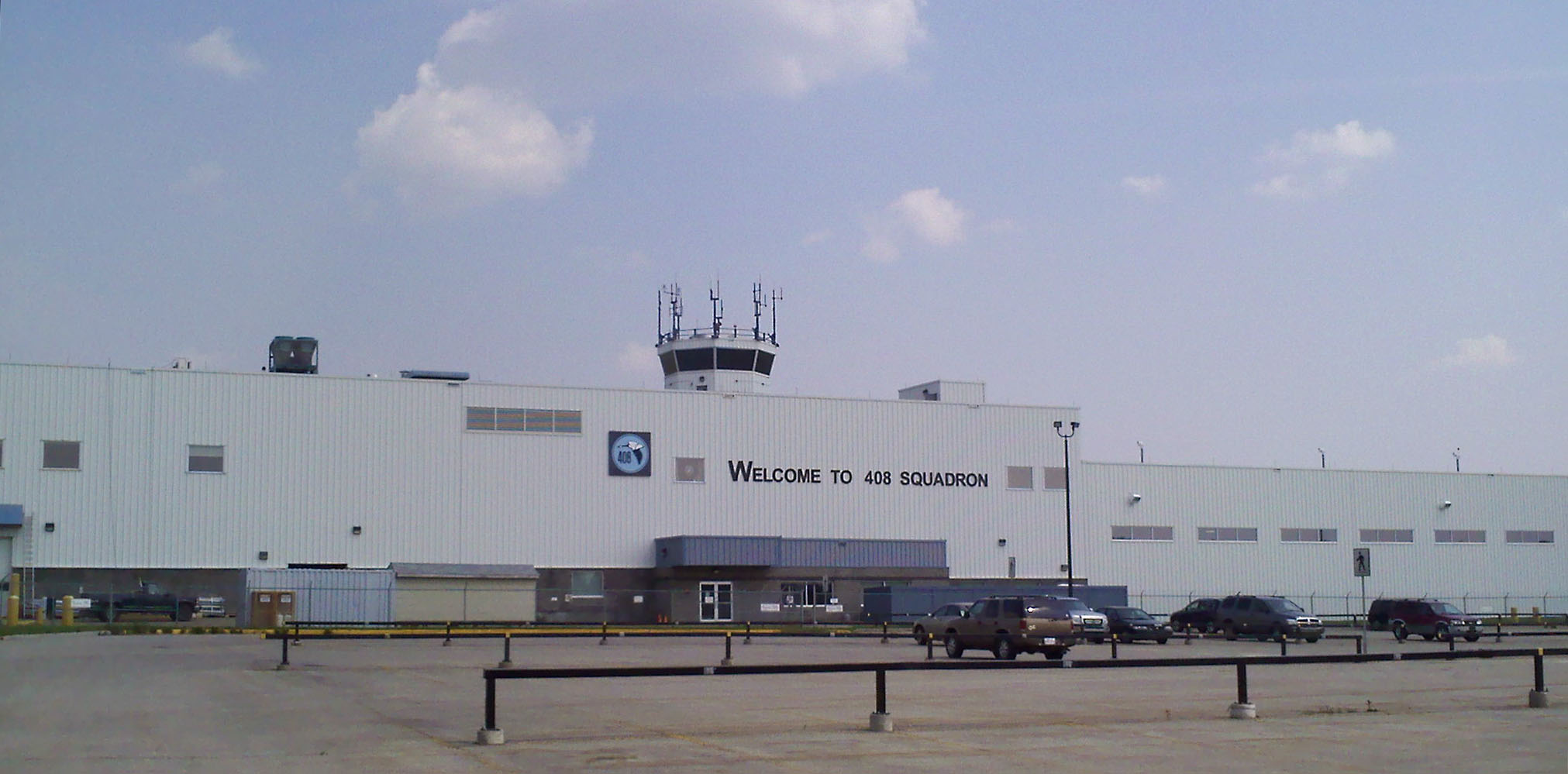
408 Squadron hangar exterior, 2011

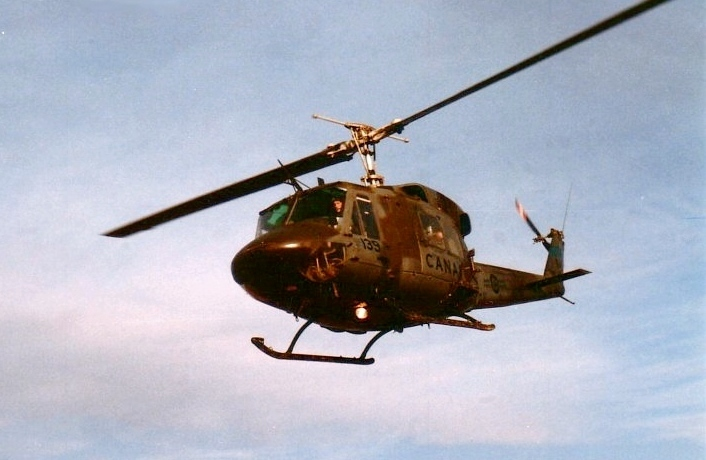
Bell CH-135 Twin Huey serving with 408 Tactical Helicopter Squadron on Exercise RV85 during 1985

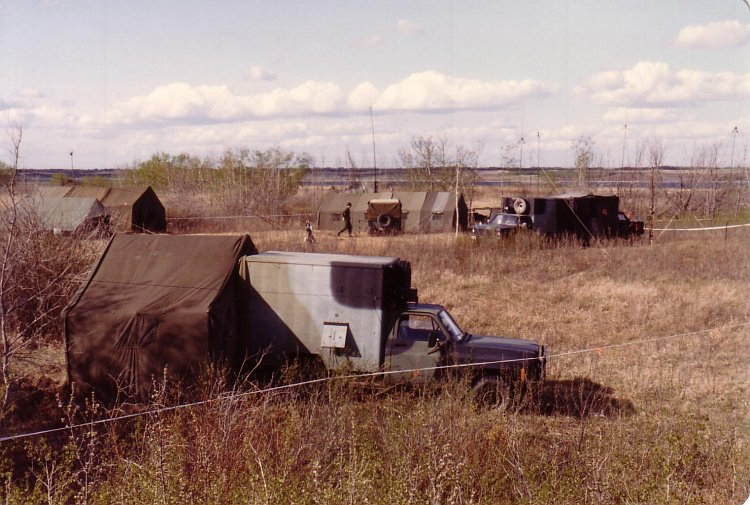
408 Tactical Helicopter Squadron Headquarters on Exercise RV83, Camp Wainwright, 1983

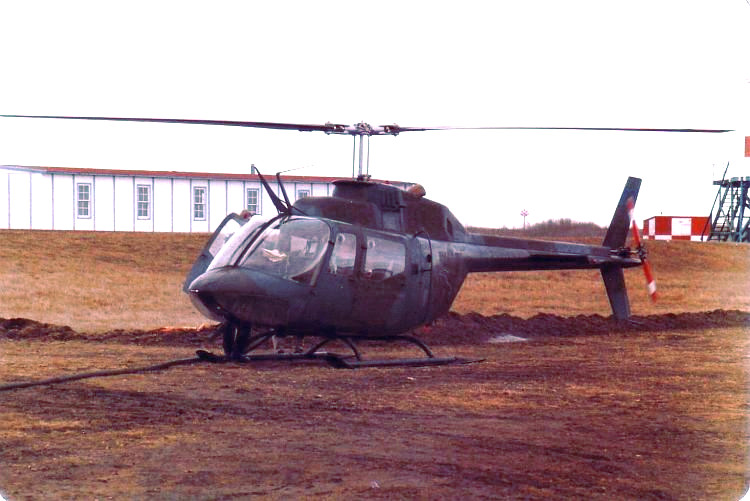
Bell CH-136 Kiowa of 408 Tactical Helicopter Squadron Camp Wainwright 1984

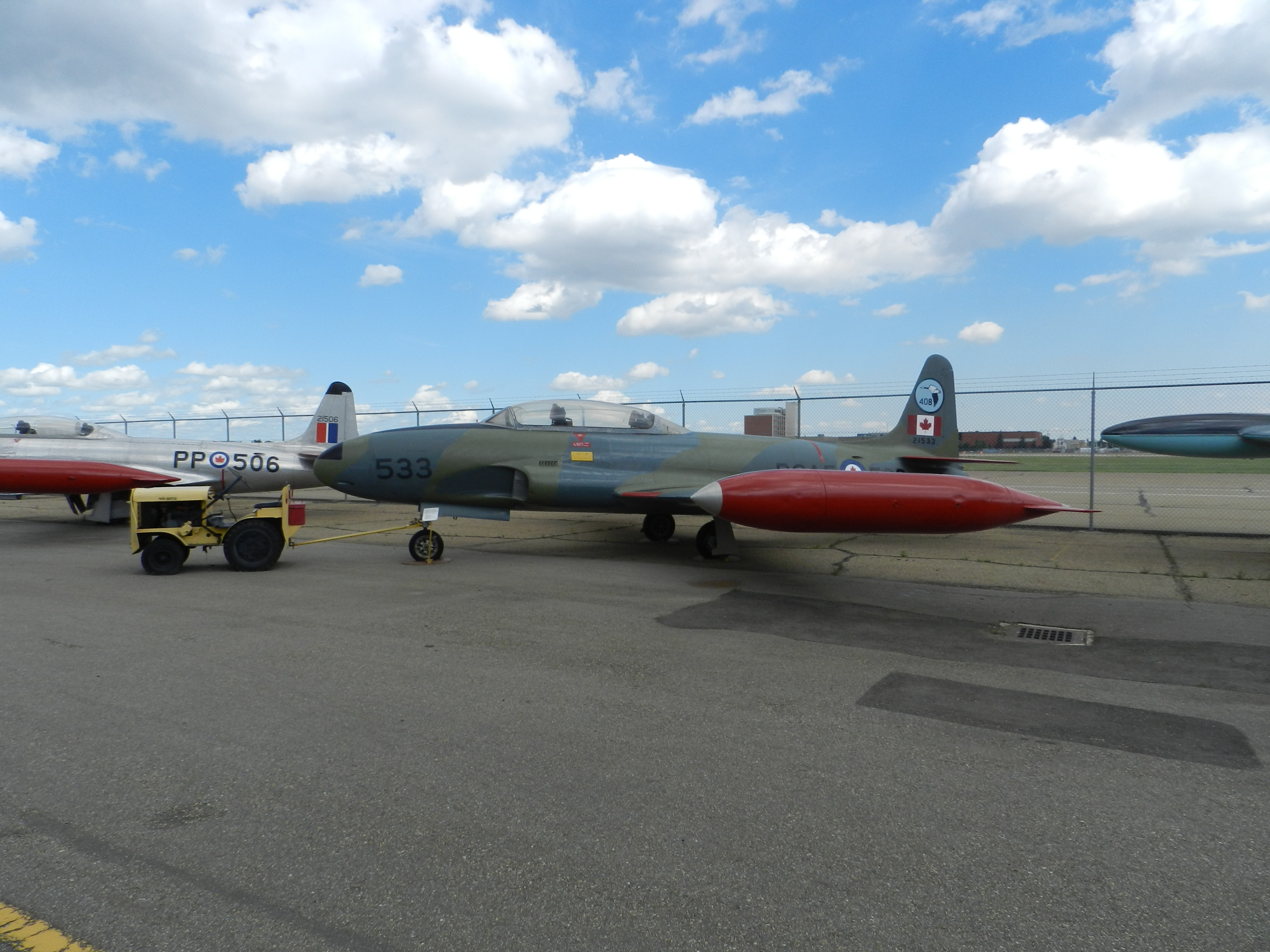
Canadair CT-133 Silver Star, older RCAF colours at the Alberta Aviation Museum

== Badges ==
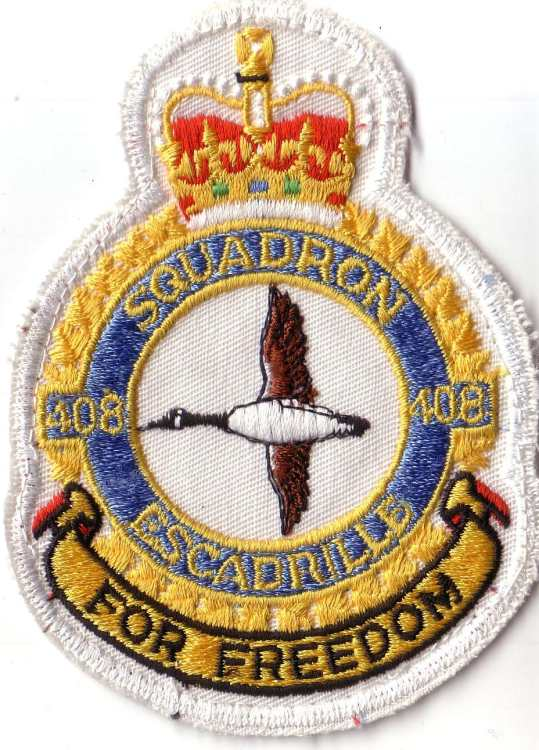
408 Tactical Helicopter Squadron official badge c. 1985

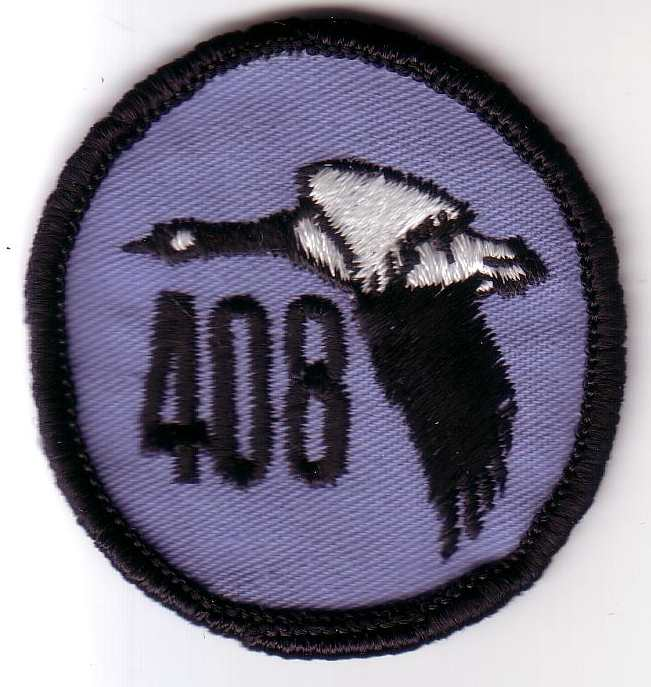
408 Tactical Helicopter Squadron unofficial badge from c. 1950–85

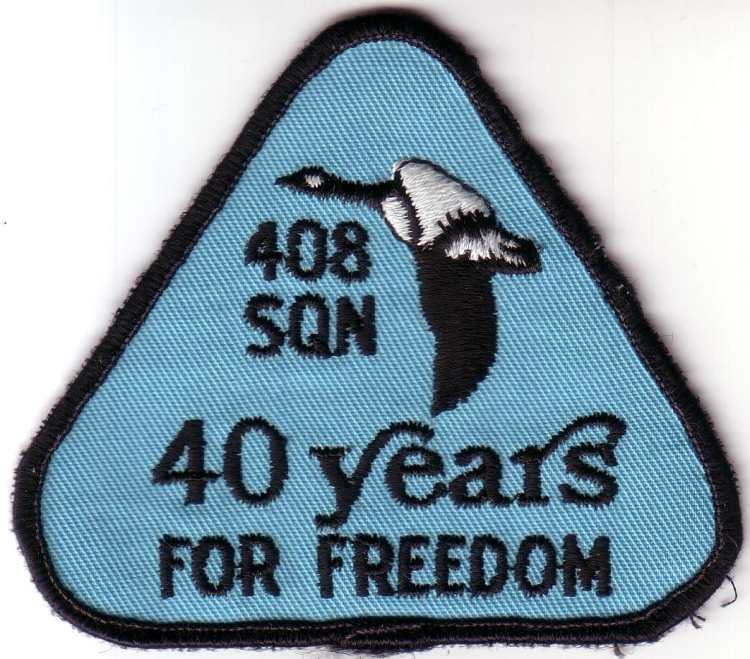
408 Tactical Helicopter Squadron unofficial 40th anniversary badge worn 1981–83

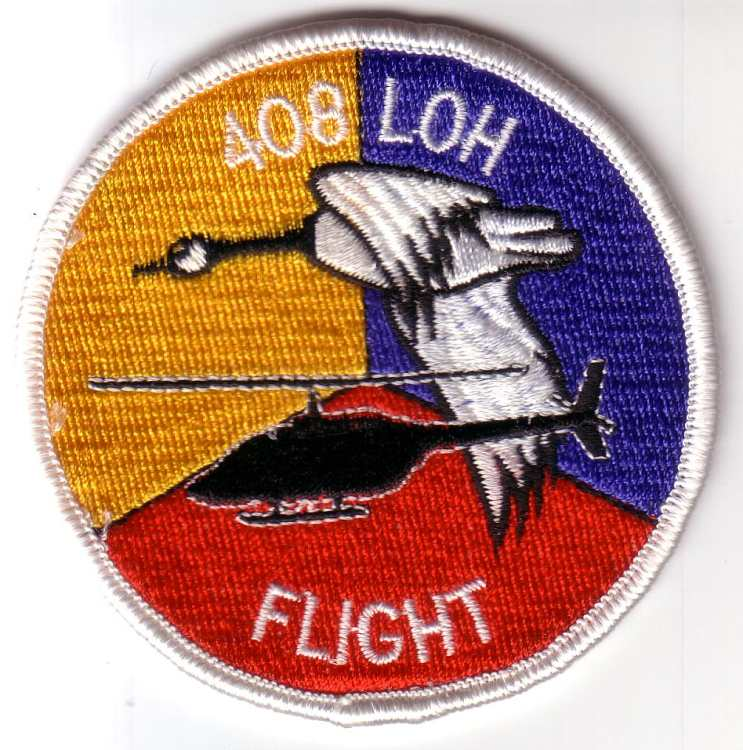
408 Tactical Helicopter Squadron LOH Flight badge worn by CH-136 Kiowa crews c. 1990.

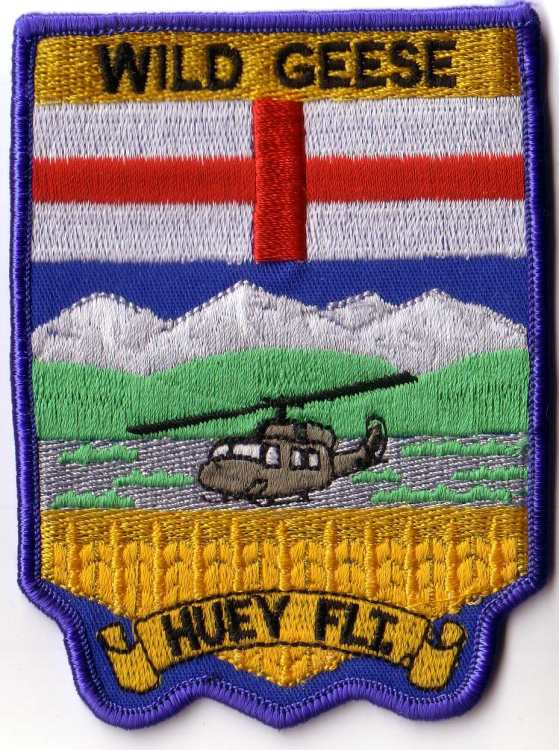
408 Tactical Helicopter Squadron UTTH Flight badge worn by CH-135 Twin Huey crews c. 1990. The badge is based on the shield of the province of Alberta

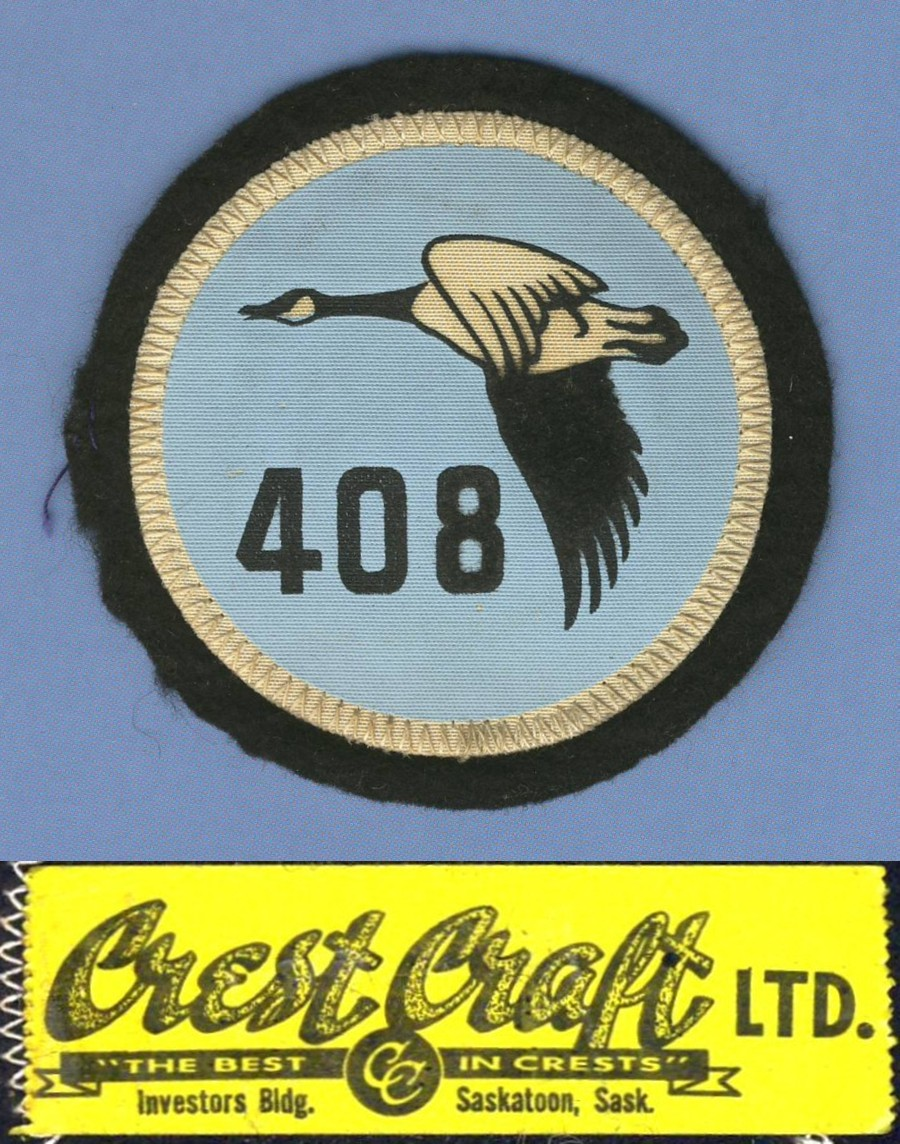
408 Squadron uniform patch manufactured by Crest Craft. Probably made in the mid to late 1960s and used during C-130 Hercules era.
