= Operation Reassurance =

Operation of the Canadian Armed Forces

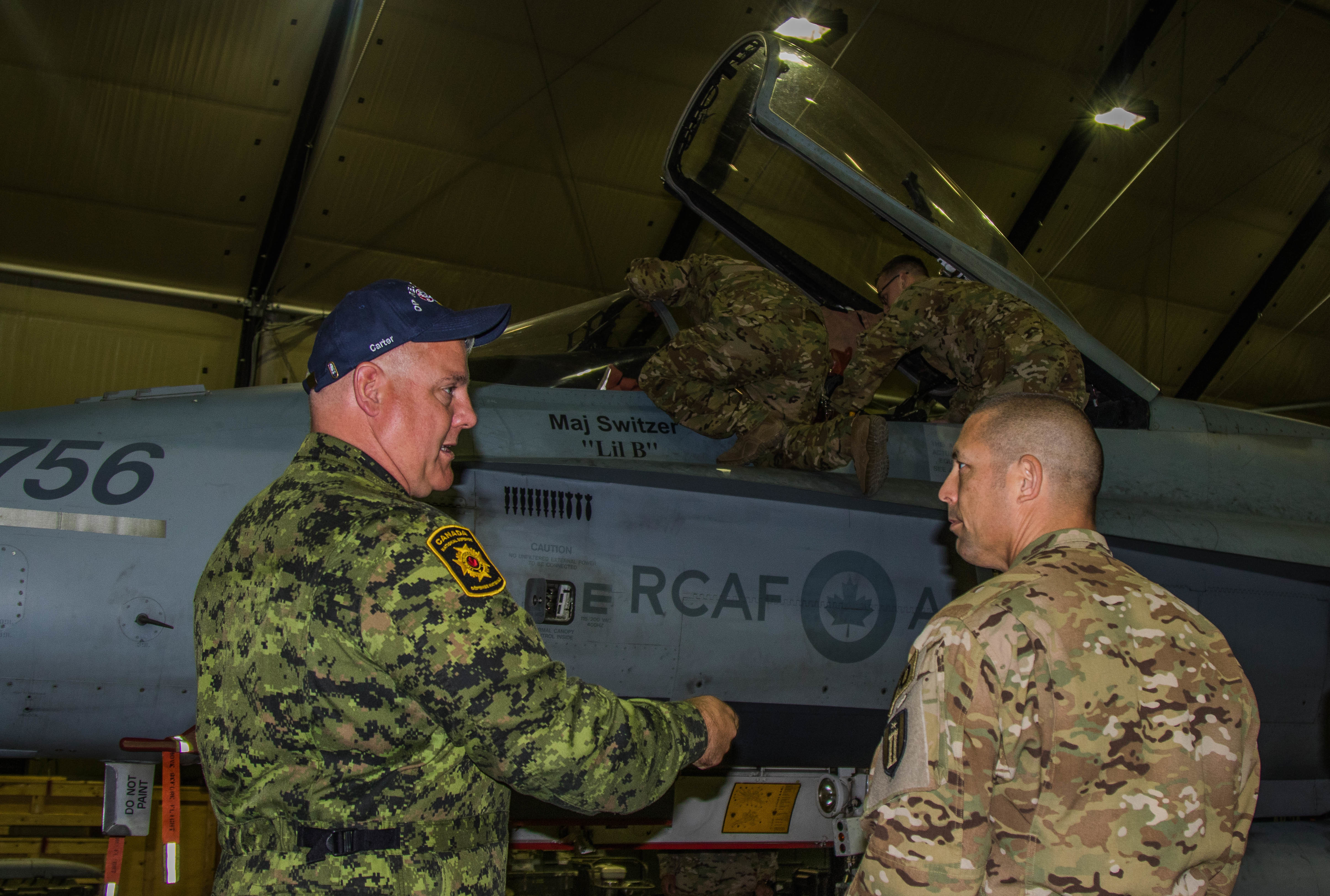
CF-188 Hornet on the NATO eAP mission at Mihail Kogălniceanu, Romania in 2018

Operation Reassurance (OpRe) is an initiative of the Canadian Armed Forces (CAF) which dates from 2014, when NATO partners "agreed upon and began to enact a series of military measures on 16 April 2014", in response to the February 2014 annexation of Crimea by the Russian Federation. The initial financial commitment was agreed to at a meeting of the Harper Cabinet the next day. As of 25 March 2022 it funds the deployment of approximately 1,375 CAF members.

== History ==
In January 2016, 5 Canadian Mechanized Brigade Group (5 CMBG) of the 2nd Canadian Division was sent to eastern Europe.

Under Minister of Defence Harjit Sajjan on 22 August 2016 soldiers from the 3rd Canadian Division departed for OpRe on "as part of the Government of Canada's ongoing commitment to Eastern Europe". They were to replace 5 CMBG.

Latvia, the site of the Canadian-led NATO battlegroup, in its region

In 2017, 540 members of the CAF were deployed to a base near Riga, Latvia, to establish a NATO battlegroup, whose certification exercise was conducted in August of that year. The NATO battlegroup in Latvia was part of the NATO Enhanced Forward Presence. The Latvian deployment is the largest deployment of Canadian troops in Europe and was renewed in 2018 for another four years to March 2023.

From June to December 2019 Commodore Josée Kurtz commanded Standing NATO Maritime Group 2 (SNMG2) under OpRe. SNMG2 is tasked with patrol of the Mediterranean Sea and Black Sea.

From July to December 2020 HMCS Toronto was deployed to Standing NATO Maritime Group 1 (SNMG1) under OpRe.

On 18 January 2021 Commodore Bradley Peats assumed command of SNMG1 aboard HMCS Halifax as part of OpRe.

Between July and December 2021 HMCS Fredericton was deployed in the NATO Maritime Command. The Royal Canadian Navy (RCN) commitment, of approximately 240 sailors, was then taken over by HMCS Montréal.

On 22 February 2022 Justin Trudeau announced the deployment of 460 additional troops to Latvia under the OpRe initiative.

As of February 2022 eight different RCN ships over 15 deployments had contributed to OpRe.

On 9 March 2022 Trudeau joined NATO Secretary-General Jens Stoltenberg, Spanish Prime Minister Pedro Sánchez and Latvian Prime Minister Arturs Krisjanis Karins in Oviedo, Asturias, to announce the early renewal of the OpRe Latvian troop commitment. Spain would send 150 troops to Latvia. The size of the Canadian-led battlegroup numbered in February 2022 around 1,400 troops and included soldiers from Spain, Poland, Italy, Slovakia, Czechia, Slovenia, Albania and Montenegro.

On 19 March 2022 HMCS Halifax departed for Europe to join with SNMG1.

As of 25 March 2022 OpRe accounted for

- approximately 500 sailors onboard two Halifax-class frigates, operating with NATO
- 695 soldiers leading a NATO Enhanced Forward Presence Battle Group in Latvia
- 140 members of the Royal Canadian Air Force and approximately 5 CF-188 Hornet aircraft participating in NATO Enhanced Air Policing (eAP), and one CP-140 Aurora long-range patrol aircraft

On August 26, 2025 Prime Minister Carney approved an extension of this mission into 2029. Canada has 2,200 soldiers deployed to Latvia: 500 to a headquarters in Riga, and 1700 to Camp Adazi. Over 2025 this number will increase to 2,600 soldiers with the additional 400 being based a new location in Latvia.

On October 17, 2026 a grass fire at CFB Wainwright killed 4 soldiers and injured 39 who are due to deploy to OpRe in the spring of 2027.
