= 1 Signal Regiment =

- 1^{er} Régiment des transmissions
- Active: 1958–present
- Country: Canada
- Branch: Canadian Army
- Type: Military communications
- Role: The provisioning of communications, security and service support to the commander of 1 Canadian Mechanized Brigade Group and his staff.
- Part of: 1 Canadian Mechanized Brigade Group
- Garrison/HQ: CFB Edmonton
- Mottos: Velox, Versutus, Vigilans (Swift, Skilled, Alert)
- Branch colors: French grey and dark blue
- March: "Begone Dull Care"
- Mascot: Jimmy
- Engagements: Bosnia-Herzegovina; Operation Palladium; Kosovo; Operation Kinetic; War in Afghanistan (2001–2014); Operation APOLLO; Operation ATHENA; Operation Mountain Thrust; Operation Zahara; Battle of Panjwaii; Domestic Operations; 1997 Red River flood; Operation Assistance; Ice Storm of 1998; Operation Recuperation

Commanders
- Commanding Officer: Lieutenant-Colonel J. Chor
- Regimental Sergeant Major: Chief Warrant Officer H.M. Keating

1 Signal Regiment is a Regular Force army unit of the Canadian Armed Forces at CFB Edmonton. The regiment is part of 3rd Canadian Division's 1 Canadian Mechanized Brigade Group (1 CMBG). Prior to its June 2026 reorganization from squadron to regiment, it was named 1 Canadian Mechanized Brigade Group Headquarters and Signal Squadron.

== History ==
1 Signal Regiment traces its heritage back to the formation of the Royal Canadian Corps of Signals on 24 October 1903. Before the end of the Second World War, small signal sections provided tactical communications for the Canadian Army's various brigade headquarters. After the war, brigade communication requirements expanded significantly, and it became necessary for the army to expand these sections into squadrons.

In 1958, as part of the reorganization of the Canadian Army, 1 Signal Squadron was formed from elements of the 1 Canadian Divisional Signal Regiment, in Borden, Ontario and was relocated Calgary, Alberta by the end of the year.

Initially, 1 Signal Squadron was a separate unit from the brigade group headquarters. In 1972, for reasons of efficiency and cost effectiveness, 1 Combat Group Headquarters and 1 Signal Squadron were combined into 1 Combat Group Headquarters and Signal Squadron. In 1978, the unit was redesignated 1 Canadian Brigade Group Headquarters and Signal Squadron, and took its current name in 1992, becoming the 1 Canadian Mechanized Brigade Group Headquarters and Signal Squadron.

On June 19, 2026, the unit held a change of command ceremony in conjunction with the unit's reorganization from squadron to regiment and its change of name to 1 Signal Regiment.

== Commanding officers ==
=== 1 Signal Squadron ===
- Major A.P. Cote, May 1958 – July 1959
- Major E.G. Coombe, July 1959 – June 1962
- Major D.C. Coughtry, June 1962 – August 1964
- Major B.H. Bennett, August 1964 – May 1965
- Major P.H. Sutton, January 1966 – July 1967
- Major J.D.B. Kent, July 1967 – March 1969
- Captain J.H. Racine, March 1969 – July 1969
- Major G.L. Mowry, July 1969 – July 1971
- Major A.J. Freeman, July 1971 - December 1972

=== 1 Combat Group Headquarters and Signal Squadron ===
- Maj A.J. Freeman, December 1972 - July 1973
- Major D.R.A. McLean, July 1973 – April 1975
- Captain Routledge, April 1975 – February 1976
- Major J.M. Savage, February 1976 – July 1978
- Maj P.P.A.J.D. Boudreau, July 1978 - December 1978

=== 1 Canadian Brigade Group Headquarters and Signal Squadron ===
- Major P.P.A.J.D. Boudreau, December 1978 - July 1981
- Major J.N. Brittain, July 1981 – July 1983
- Major L.M. Juteau, July 1983 – July 1985
- Major J. Holt, July 1985 – July 1988
- Major H.W. Coyle, July 1988 – July 1990
- Major R.W. Wright, July 1990 – July 1992
- Major R.C. Johnston, July 1992 - August 1992

=== 1 Canadian Mechanized Brigade Group Headquarters and Signal Squadron ===
- Maj R.C. Johnston, August 1992 - July 1994
- Major A.A. McPhee, July 1994 – July 1997
- Major B.K. Green, July 1997 – July 1998
- Major S.W. Hall, July 1998 – February 2000
- Major R.T. Williams, February 2000 – July 2000
- Major P.R. Bossé, July 2000 – July 2002
- Lieutenant-Colonel A.H.J. Schwab, July 2002 – June 2004
- Major J. Blythe, June 2004 – December 2006
- Lieutenant-Colonel G.T. Whelan, December 2006 – August 2008
- Lieutenant-Colonel P.R.T Whynacht, August 2008 – June 2010
- Major N.Y. Lemieux, June 2010 – January 2011
- Lieutenant-Colonel L.M. Smid, January 2011 – June 2013
- Major J.Y.A. Côté, June 2013 – June 2015
- Major W.K.E. Jull, June 2015 – 2017
- Major J.C. Gash, June 2017 – June 2018
- Major B.N. Blyth, June 2018 – Aug 2020
- Major R.W. Thompson, Aug 2020 – June 2022
- Major G.J. Barr, June 2022 – August 2024
- Major C.J.I. Gergely, August 2024 – June 2026

=== 1 Signal Regiment ===
- Major C.J.I. Gergely, June 2026
- Lieutenant-Colonel J. Chor, June 2026 - Present

== Regimental sergeants major ==
=== 1 Signal Squadron ===
- WO2 S. Reading, 1958 – 1959
- WO2 G.E. Wilson, 1959–1960
- WO2 K.F. NcKnight, 1960 – 1961
- WO2 W. Shannon, 1961 – 1963
- WO2 J.M. Blair, 1963 – 1965
- WO2 E.G. Chartrand, 1965 – 1967
- MWO B. Murphy, 1967–1969
- MWO Clark, 1969 – 1972
- MWO H. Searls, 1972

=== 1 Combat Group Headquarters and Signal Squadron ===
- MWO H. Searls, December 1972 - June 1975
- CWO B. Janik, June 1975 – June 1978
- CWO W. Kelly, June 1978 – December 1978

=== 1 Canadian Brigade Group Headquarters and Signal Squadron ===
- CWO W. Kelly, December 1978 – June 1981
- CWO F.O. Marryatt, June 1981 – July 1986
- CWO S.A. Macaulay, July 1986 – July 1990
- CWO J.E. Pollock, July 1990 - August 1992

=== 1 Canadian Mechanized Brigade Group Headquarters and Signal Squadron ===
- CWO J.E. Pollock, August 1992 - September 1994
- CWO J.C. Browne, September 1994 – March 1997
- MWO A.H. Whittal, March 1997 – August 1997
- CWO H.D. Elhorn, August 1997 – February 2000
- MWO R.F. Phillips, February 2000 – June 2000
- CWO J.M. Laviolette, June 2000 – July 2003
- CWO V.W. Kelley, June 2003 – February 2005
- CWO A.O. Lopes, February 2005 – April 2006
- CWO R.J. Richard, January 2006 – November 2007
- CWO W.A. Brown, November 2007 – June 2010
- CWO F.I.E. Petzold, June 2010 – October 2011
- CWO P.C. West, October 2011 – June 2013
- CWO R.S. Guérin, June 2013 – June 2015
- CWO T.F. Stevens, June 2015 – June 2018
- CWO S.B. Edwards, June 2018 – July 2021
- CWO S.R.J. Loyer, July 2021 – May 2023
- CWO G.D. Given, May 2023 – June 2026

=== 1 Signal Regiment ===
- CWO G.D. Given, June 2026
- CWO H.M. Keating, June 2026 – Present

== See also ==
- 1 Canadian Mechanized Brigade Group
