= Regular Force =

Canadian Armed Forces' full-time military

In the Canadian Armed Forces, a Regular Force unit or person is part of the full-time military, as opposed to being part of the Primary Reserve which has more flexibility. There are many bases and wings across Canada, and factors like trade, career progression, and environment will affect where the person ends up. They receive more pay and benefits than members of the Primary Reserve and can be ordered into overseas deployments.

Regular Force personnel are employed full-time, and have usually signed long-term contracts ranging anywhere from three to nine years, not including subsidized training or education.

There are approximately 68,000 Regular Force personnel in the Canadian Forces, close to the current authorized strength of 71,500 Regular Force members. On the other hand, the Reserve Forces have an authorized force size of 30,000 members.

== Organization ==
=== Royal Canadian Navy ===
The Royal Canadian Navy (RCN) protects Canadian sovereignty and interests at sea, at home and abroad. Whether during times of conflict or peace, the RCN promotes global stability, enforces international law and helps protect both the Canadian and world economies. The RCN is made up of approximately 8,400 Regular Force personnel, 4,100 Reservists and 3,800 civilian employees.

The Regular Force component of the Royal Canadian Navy consists of the two fleets, MARLANT and MARPAC and all ships crews except for the majority of those serving on board the Kingston-class coastal defence vessels which are crewed largely by the Primary Reserve.

=== Canadian Army ===
The Canadian Army produces soldiers for operations at home and abroad. 22,500 members serve as full-time soldiers in the Regular Force 21,500 are part-time, volunteer soldiers in the Reserve Force.

The Regular Force component of the Canadian Army consists of three field-ready brigades, with elements of a fourth at CFB Gagetown:

- 1 Canadian Mechanized Brigade Group at CFB Edmonton and CFB Shilo
- 2 Canadian Mechanized Brigade Group at CFB Petawawa
- 5 Canadian Mechanized Brigade Group at CFB Valcartier

Each brigade contains one regiment each of artillery, armour, and combat engineers and three battalions of infantry (all scaled in the British fashion), as well as a headquarters/signals squadron, and several minor organizations. A tactical helicopter squadron, a field ambulance, and a service battalion (logistics) are co-located with each brigade but not part of the brigade's command structure.

=== Royal Canadian Air Force ===
The Royal Canadian Air Force (RCAF) is a part of National Defence and the Canadian Armed Forces. It defends and protects Canadian and North American airspace in partnership with the United States. The RCAF also contributes to international peace and security.

The Regular Force component of the Royal Canadian Air Force consists of all wings with their sub-unit squadrons at bases across the country.

== History ==
The heritage of the Canadian Infantry and Armoured Regiments is deeply rooted in the heritage and history of the British Army. Many regiments are modeled after the regiments of the British Army, with an official system of "alliances" or affiliations established to perpetuate a sense of shared history.

During the inter-war years between the two world wars, Canada scraped by with a small standing army of 3,000 to 4,000 men. Its mission is nothing but the training of the militia, both for direct defense and for the task of providing expeditionary forces if necessary. However, in 1946, a permanent armed force of approximately 51,000 personnel was authorized, of which approximately 25,000 at all levels were assigned to the Army's active duty units and the remainder to the Navy and Air Force. This "active-duty army" is no longer just a trainer for the militia, but can be deployed to respond to international events that Canada may have to deal with. While the militia will remain the larger force in numbers, its training will no longer be a priority for the regular army.

Between 1953 and 1971, the regular Canadian infantry consisted of seven regiments, each of two battalions. Approximately two-thirds of the Regular Force is composed of anglophone units, while one third is francophone.

== Employment and training ==
Members of the Regular Force can join through job applications, recruitment, or paid education programs. When applying to join the Canadian Armed Forces, applicants complete the Canadian Forces Aptitude Test (CFAT) and select up to three preferred positions. Members of the Reserve Force can apply to initiate a component transfer (CT) online through the Defence Wide Area Network (DWAN) to transition to the Regular Force.

=== Paid education ===
The paid education programs pay for the complete cost of school fees, including tuition, books, and academic equipment, as well as an annual salary of $27,600 per year with health and dental benefits. Graduates of the paid education program are guaranteed a job with the CAF in their field. Military commitment with the paid education program requires two months of service for every month of paid education.

Programs eligible for the paid education program include skilled trades, undergraduate degrees, and graduate specialty programs.

The Non-Commissioned Member Subsidized Training and Education Plan (NCMSTEP) provides paid education for authorized courses of study. This program is for both civilians without CAF service and non-commissioned members of the Regular Force or Reserve Force. Non-commissioned members are any military personnel other than officers, who are enrolled in the CAF.

The Regular Officer Training Plan (ROTP) provides paid education for undergraduate university degrees in engineering, Science, or Arts, with graduates entering the officer rank upon completion of their degree. Applicants can attend either of the two Canadian military colleges or at another Canadian university. If applicants choose to attend one of the military colleges, they also receive second language training. While enrolled in school, students are enlisted as officer or naval cadets. Graduate programs, such as medical or dental training, are also available as part of the paid education program.

=== Indigenous recruitment ===
There are also recruitment programs for Indigenous peoples, both paid education and designated recruitment.

The Aboriginal Leadership Opportunity Year (ALOY) offers Indigenous students the opportunity to enroll for one academic year at Royal Military College in Kingston, Ontario, as an officer cadet. This program includes individual learning plans designed to provide students with smaller learning groups for both non-credit and first-year university-level courses. Upon completion of the one-year program, students can apply to complete a degree program at the Royal Military College or join the CAF full-time.

The Canadian Armed Forces Indigenous Entry Program (CAFIEP) is a three-week training program at either the Canadian Forces Leadership and Recruit School in Saint-Jean-sur-Richelieu, Quebec, or at Canadian Forces Base Halifax, Nova Scotia. At the end of the three weeks, recruits return home until the next available Basic Training course.
