= Canadian Manoeuvre Training Centre =

- Centre canadien d'entraînement aux manœuvres
- Active: 2004—present
- Country: Canada
- Branch: Canadian Army
- Part of: Canadian Army Doctrine and Training Centre
- Headquarters: CFB Wainwright, Alberta
- Motto: Doctrinas bello aptare (Latin for 'teaching the arts of war')
- Website: canada.ca/en/army/corporate/canadian-army-doctrine-and-training-centre/canadian-manoeuvre-training-centre.html

Commanders
- Commander: Colonel Scott MacGregor

The Canadian Manoeuvre Training Centre (CMTC) is the Canadian Army's functional centre of excellence for collective training and is the army collective training training authority on behalf of its higher headquarters, the Canadian Army Doctrine and Training Centre. It is housed by 3rd Canadian Division Support Base Detachment Wainwright, in Denwood, Alberta.

As of 2023, the commander of the CMTC is Colonel Scott MacGregor.

== Overview ==
CMTC's mission is to deliver collective training within a realistic and immersive contemporary operating environment. CMTC also provides support to exercise design, delivery, and execution for the Canadian Army and its allies. CMTC executes its mission through a combination of force-on-force exercises, simulation training, courses, professional development, and exchanges with allies.

Logo of CMTC

=== History ===
CMTC was established in 2004 and delivered its first exercise, Exercise Maple Guardian in 2006, but assisted in running the brigade training event in 2005. In 2006, the primary focus of CMTC was to train task forces deploying to Afghanistan. Since the end of the Canadian combat mission in Afghanistan, CMTC continues to design and deliver collective training exercises to maintain the warfighting capabilities of the Canadian Army's brigades and battlegroups.

== Formation structure ==
CMTC manages exercise design, delivery, and execution through leveraging its sub-components

=== CMTC Headquarters ===
CMTC Headquarters is the unit responsible for exercise design and planning. It conducts planning conferences, writing boards, and site reconnaissance with exercise participants in order to design exercises that will best fit their training aims. During in-house exercises, CMTC Headquarters leads the exercise control. CMTC Headquarters is also responsible for maintaining connections with allied training centres and industry partners to incorporate best practices across a wide network.

=== CMTC Operations Group ===
CMTC Operations Group is the unit responsible for the execution of exercises. This is done through the employment of its sub-units, which provide a rich training environment, facilitate learning, and inform exercise control. The operations group consists of:

==== Observer controller trainers ====
Observer controller trainers are experienced officers, warrant officers and non-commissioned members who coach and mentor the training audience, by leveraging their experience, knowledge of doctrine, and interpretation of discrete and aggregate data. CMTC's observer controller trainers support all CMTC-led exercises, and often support other excises for the Canadian Army and allies. They also provide courses for Canadians and allies on how to be an observer controller trainer, and how to conduct an after-action review.

==== Contemporary Operating Environment Force ====
Contemporary Operating Environment Force provides unconventional, para-military, and host-nation forces and key personalities to role-play in exercises. They cover any gaps the spectrum of personalities in the battlespace, between the opposing force, training audience, and the population base. The employment of Contemporary Operating Environment Force causes soldiers to consider every person in the battlespace, and forces them to remain aware throughout the entire exercise. CMTC's Contemporary Operating Environment Force also supports allied exercises around the world.

==== Support Group ====
CMTC has an integral administration and network support capability that provides admin services to its own members and the exercises it leads.

=== Formation Training Group ===
Formation Training Group provides training to the Canadian Army at the formation level. This includes the design and delivery of Exercise United Resolve and the provision of the Canadian Army Exercise Planning and Execution Course and the Civilian - Military Interagency Planning Seminar.

=== Army Collective Training ===
Army Collective Training is responsible for upholding CMTC's duties as the functional centre of excellence for CT doctrine. CMTC's exercises are designed around the achievement of battle task standards, which are derived from operational needs and implemented in doctrine. Army Collective Training ensures that doctrine is updated as the operational environment shifts, to ensure exercises are relevant to the needs of training audiences.

== Exercises ==
=== Exercise Maple Resolve ===
Exercise Maple Resolve is the Canadian Army's cornerstone exercise for proving brigades, battlegroups, and their soldiers in the contemporary operating environment. During the exercise, soldiers test their ability to integrate with allies and other government departments as they hone their warfighting skills within a realistic, complex and demanding environment.

=== Exercise Unified Resolve ===
Exercise Unified Resolve is the Canadian Army's largest and most complex computer-assisted training exercise. The training plays a key role in confirming the operational readiness of mechanized brigade group command and control elements and tests their ability to plan and conduct missions. During the simulation, participants react to computer-assisted scenarios within the contemporary operating environment across the full spectrum of conflict.

=== Integrated Capstone Exercise ===
CMTC conducts the Integrated Capstone Exercise as part of the CAF's contribution as the framework nation for the Enhanced Forward Presence Battlegroup Latvia. Integrated Capstone Exercise confirms that the Enhanced Forwarding Presence meets the supreme allied commander Europe's requirements, and that the eight sending nations and framework nation are effectively integrated into one multinational battlegroup. CMTC typically deploys on two Integrated Capstone Exercise rotations a year, spring and fall.

=== Joint Readiness Training Centre Rotation ===
CMTC conducts the certification and validation of a light infantry battle group in the planning and command and control of high-intensity tactical operations facing a hybrid threat consisting of a near-peer conventional force and irregular units in a joint, interagency, multi-national, and public contemporary operating environment. The field training exercise is in Fort Johnson, Louisiana, United States.

== Exercise features ==
=== Weapons Effects Simulation ===
The Weapons Effects Simulation system is a live simulation system that represents people, vehicles, and equipment in combat situations. The system includes both vehicle and person-worn systems with laser detectors and projectors, linked to a GPS system that allows each individual soldier's actions and fate on the battlefield to be centrally tracked. The system is provided by CUBIC.

=== Civilians in the battlespace ===
CMTC contracts a population of civilians in the battlespace who populate several villages and an urban area with actors. Actors allow the training of soldiers in realistic scenarios that go beyond force-on-force combat. The civilians have an integral make-up and production team that coordinates and executes the representation of casualties with realistic injuries.

=== Exercise network ===
CMTC has the capability to run a simulated social media network on top of an isolated network. This allows everyone in the battlespace to interact in a public forum. Access to the network is granted through internet cafes and cellphones in each community. This network reinforces to training audiences that actions in the physical domain impact the information domain, and vice versa.

=== After-action reviews ===
CMTC builds after-action reviews into the various stages of its exercises. CMTC after-action reviews are informed by feedback from observer controller trainers who observe the battle in person and from command nodes, data as shown by Weapons Effects Simulation system, and the opposing force and the Contemporary Operating Environment Force. CMTC's observer controller trainers coordinate all of the available inputs for commanders to conduct their own after-action reviews.

=== Multinational training environment ===
CMTC seeks allied partners for all major exercises. CAF members deployed on operations can expect to be working in a multinational context. The regular inclusion of allies into training opportunities better prepares soldiers for the realities of integrating people, capabilities, and equipment from other nations.
