= 1 Field Ambulance =

- 1^{re} Ambulance de campagne
- Country: Canada
- Branch: Canadian Armed Forces
- Type: Field ambulance
- Role: Military medicine
- Part of: 1 Health Services Group
- Garrison/HQ: CFB Edmonton
- Motto: Militi succurrimus (Latin for 'We hasten to aid the soldiers')
- Colors: Sanguine, deep green
- March: "The Farmer's Boy"

Commanders
- Colonel-in-chief: Anne, Princess Royal

1 Field Ambulance (French: 1^{re} Ambulance de campagne) is a medical unit with the Canadian Armed Forces in Edmonton, Alberta. 1 Field Ambulance sent a contingent to Kandahar Province in Afghanistan in the fall of 2009.

== Notable members ==
- Master Corporal Paul Franklin, who lost his legs in Afghanistan in 2006 but continued to serve in uniform for several years.
- Corporal Andrew James Eykelenboom, killed in a suicide attack near Spin Boldak (August 11, 2006).
- Private Colin William Wilmot, killed when a bomb detonated while he was on a foot patrol in the early morning of July 6, 2008.
