= CFB Wainwright =

Military base in Denwood, Alberta, Canada

CFB Wainwright Wainwright/Camp Wainwright Field Heliport
- IATA: none; ICAO: none; TC LID: CFF7; WMO: 71118

Summary
- Airport type: Military
- Operator: DND
- Serves: Wainwright, Alberta
- Location: Denwood, Alberta
- Time zone: Alberta Time (UTC−06:00)
- Elevation AMSL: 2,170 ft (660 m)
- Coordinates: 52°49′41″N 110°54′16″W

Map
- Location in Alberta CFF7 (Canada)

Helipads
Number	Length		Surface
Number	ft	m	Surface
FATO	4,000 x 100	1,219 × 30	Grass / snow
PAD	132 x 100	40 × 30	Concrete
- Source: Canada Flight Supplement; Environment Canada

3rd Canadian Division Support Base Detachment Wainwright, commonly referred to as Canadian Forces Base Wainwright or CFB Wainwright, is a Canadian Forces base in Denwood, Alberta, adjacent to the town of Wainwright.

== History ==
The 583 km^{2} (225 sq mi) Buffalo National Park was closed in 1940. Under a wartime Order in Council, the Department of National Defence (DND) occupied most of the park for military training, formally taking it over on September 30, 1940. After the park was abolished in 1947, the Government of Alberta transferred 150 sq mi (390 km^{2}) of the former park to Canada for DND's use under an agreement approved that year. The land was used for an ammunition storage facility as well as an army training camp. DND owned an adjacent 75 km^{2} (29 sq mi) property and used the facility for live-fire artillery, armoured and infantry training.

Called Wainwright Military Camp, or just Camp Wainwright, after the nearby Canadian National Railways division point, the facility saw use from January 29, 1945, to May 24, 1946, as a prisoner of war (POW) internment camp for 523 captured German officers, soldiers and civilians from its first day of operation to 1,100 POWs at its peak. During the 16 months the POW camp was in full operation, only two prisoners made a successful escape. They were recaptured just over a month later, but not until they had reached Gary, Indiana, United States.

Decommissioned as a POW internment camp in 1946, Camp Wainwright reverted to a Canadian Army training facility. The camp staff and guard company were reduced to nil strength a few weeks later, marking the end of this chapter of CFB/ASU Wainwright's history. Wainwright's infrastructure expanded significantly during the Korean War as buildings were constructed to house and train soldiers in three Canadian Army battalions, as well as units that would form British Commonwealth Forces Korea such as the 25th Canadian Infantry Brigade.

The February 1968 merger of the Canadian Army, Royal Canadian Navy and Royal Canadian Air Force to form the Canadian Forces was predated by a number of major changes to Canada's military structure. One of these saw Camp Wainwright transferred on January 1, 1967, to become an auxiliary satellite training camp of CFB Calgary. This was reverted on August 1, 1967, due to command and control problems, and Camp Wainwright became Canadian Forces Base Wainwright (CFB Wainwright) as a separate entity within the establishment of CFB Calgary.

An airfield was opened at CFB Wainwright in October 1967 and at the time of official unification, CFB Wainwright became a component of Training Command, as the facility was tasked as a training area. CFB Wainwright offered both officer and basic training courses, battalion-level unit operations and acted as a host for training foreign detachments. Wainwright also offered administrative support services for 1 Canadian Brigade Group units.

Subsequent changes to the force structure saw Wainwright's role as a training facility evolve, particularly as the garrisons at CFB Calgary and CFB Edmonton shifted some of their training to the newly established and much larger CFB Suffield.

On July 15, 1974, the 1 Combat Group Operational Training Detachment was formed at CFB Wainwright to conduct individual training for two or more units of Mobile Command's 1 Combat Group.

In 1980, to celebrate the 75th anniversary of the formation of Alberta, a small number of bison was transferred from Elk Island National Park to the grounds of the base. The herd remains on the base as of 2018.

In 1983, CFB Wainwright consisted of the training facilities, the 742 Communication Detachment and a British Army liaison detachment.

Defence cuts following the end of the Cold War during the 1990s resulted in the closure of CFB Calgary and consolidation of units at CFB Edmonton. CFB Wainwright was also impacted by defence cuts and was reduced to an area support unit (ASU). ASU Wainwright, as the facility is also called, has 690 military personnel and 300 civilian workers. As part of 3rd Canadian Division Support Group (3 CDSG), it hosts the 3rd Canadian Division Training Centre (3 CDTC) and the Canadian Manoeuvre Training Centre (CMTC), as well as the following units:

- 3rd Canadian Division Support Group Signal Squadron
- 1 Field Ambulance Detachment
- 1 Dental Detachment
- 1 Garrison Military Police Company detachment
- 1 Engineer Equipment Troop

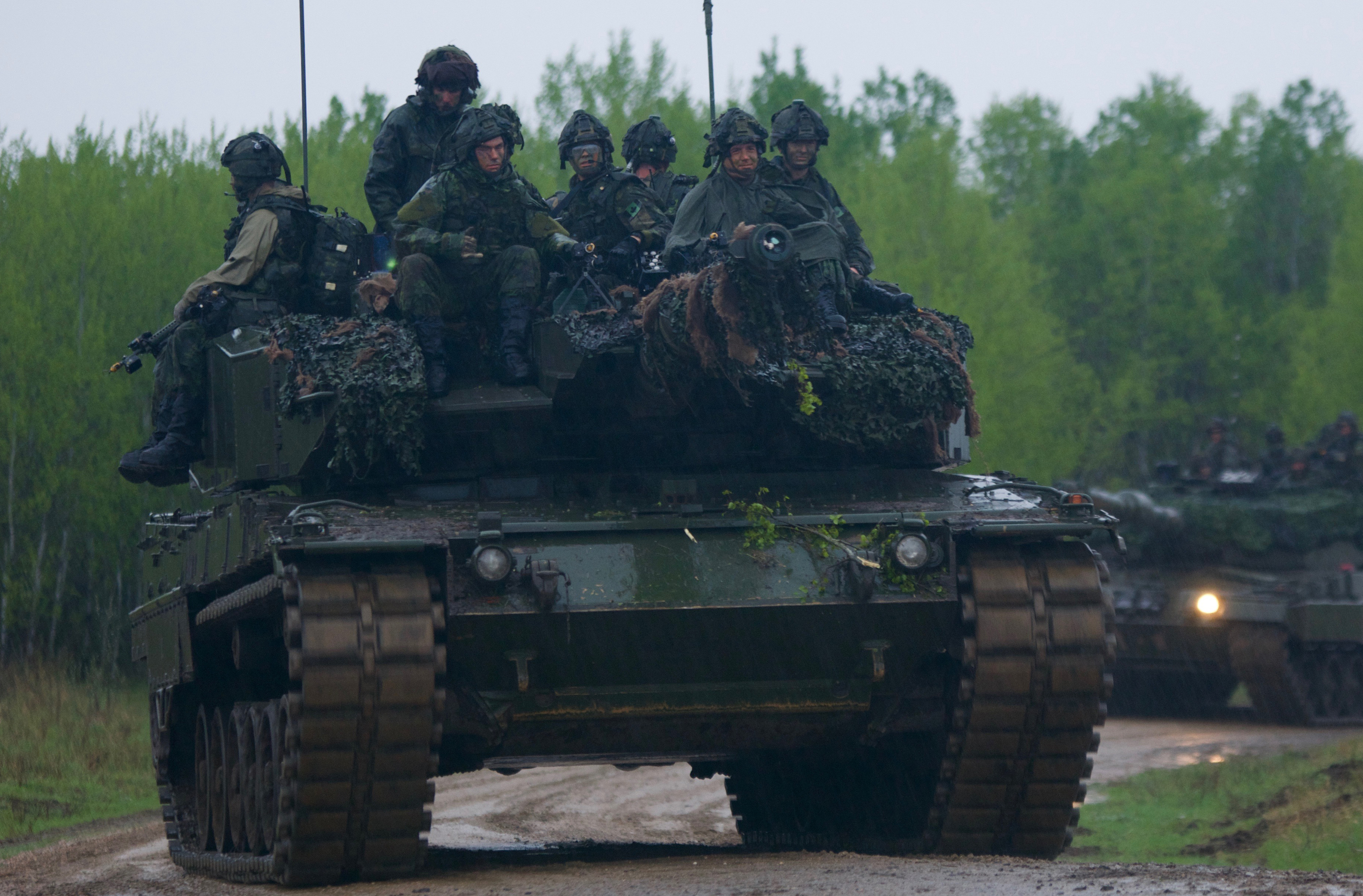
Canadian soldiers aboard a Leopard 2A4 during manoeuvres in 2017 at the garrison.

The transient military population averages over 1,000 personnel at any given time, and in the summer it grows significantly when hundreds of primary reservists undertake annual training. As of 2009 it is the main training base of 1 Canadian Mechanized Brigade Group, including Princess Patricia's Canadian Light Infantry (PPCLI), and covers an area of 609 km^{2} (235 sq mi), which includes 25 weapons ranges. Although primarily a training base for the Canadian Army it is also used by the Royal Canadian Air Force to train fighter bombers and search and rescue practice. The base also includes Wainwright/Wainwright (Field 21) Airport (52°49′51″N 111°06′04″W) located 9 nautical miles (17 km; 10 mi) west of Wainwright, approximately 7 NM (13 km; 8.1 mi) west of CFB Wainright, with a 7,349 ft (2,240 m) asphalt runway.

The Wainwright Military Family Resource Centre (MFRC), located on CFB Wainwright, provides resources and support for military families.

Since 1942, 140 Royal Canadian Sea Cadet Corps Cayuga has operated on CFB Wainwright. In 2015, 3003 Royal Canadian Army Cadet Corps Battle River (PPCLI) was relocated to CFB Wainwright from Edgerton, Alberta.

=== 2026 fire incident ===
At approximately 4 pm Alberta Time on October 17, 2026, the Royal Canadian Mounted Police were called to respond to a fire at a training area within the base, which was spread by strong winds. Minister of National Defence David McGuinty confirmed that the Canadian Armed Forces and that all three levels of government and other provinces were organizing support. Sources in the Canadian Armed Forces told Global News that the fire started when a live-fire training exercise ignited a gas explosion; however, the provincial regulator reported no signs of damage to any gas infrastructure. Just after 10:45 pm on October 17, the Municipal District of Wainwright No. 61 said the fire was being held.

On October 18, Prime Minister Mark Carney confirmed the deaths of four service members and added that dozens were seriously injured. A code orange was declared in Edmonton, according to Dr. Warren Thirsk, an emergency department physician at the Royal Alexandra Hospital, a disaster response protocol required for a high number of patients being transported to the city's hospitals from Wainwright. Wainwright's healthcare facilities were "completely overwhelmed" by the number of casualties. Most of the 39 hospitalized casualties were transported by two STARS air ambulance helicopters, six airplanes, and 22 ground ambulances to the Royal Alexandra Hospital and University of Alberta Hospital in Edmonton, Red Deer Regional Hospital in Red Deer, and the Foothills Medical Centre in Calgary. A fifth member died on November 13.

== See also ==
- Wainwright Aerodrome
- Canadian Manoeuvre Training Centre
