= 1 Canadian Mechanized Brigade Group =

Brigade of the Canadian Army

- 1^{er} Groupe-brigade mécanisé du Canada
- Brigade group badge
- Active: 1953–present
- Country: Canada
- Branch: Canadian Army
- Type: Brigade group
- Part of: 1st Canadian Division
- Garrison/HQ: Edmonton
- Motto: Semper vigilans
- March: "Sons of the Brave"
- Website: canada.ca/en/army/corporate/3-canadian-division/1-canadian-mechanized-brigade-group.html

Commanders
- Current commander: Colonel S. French MSM CD

Insignia
NATO Map Symbol
1
1

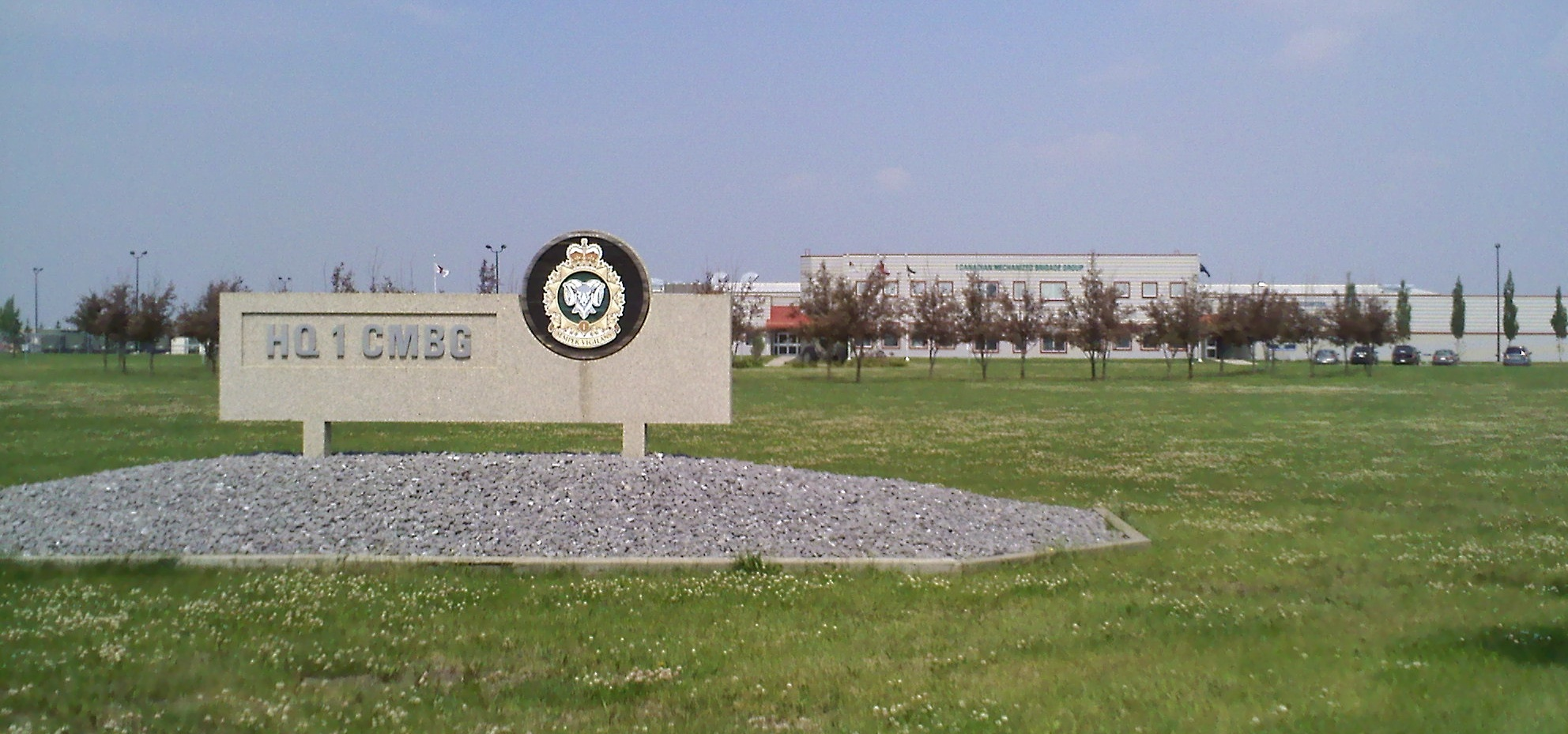
Headquarters

1 Canadian Mechanized Brigade Group (1 CMBG; French: 1^{er} Groupe-brigade mécanisé du Canada, 1 GBMC) is a Canadian Forces brigade group that is part of the 1st Canadian Division of the Canadian Army. Originally headquartered at CFB Calgary, it is currently based in CFB Edmonton in Alberta with one major unit at CFB Shilo in Manitoba, and consists of six Regular Force units.

== History ==
The brigade's history goes all the way back to the 1st Canadian Infantry Brigade, which was formed in 1911. The brigade fought in the First World War (the Somme, Vimy Ridge, Passchendaele, Amiens and Second World War (Sicily, Italy, Holland).

On 14 October 1953, the 1st Canadian Infantry Brigade was reactivated to relieve the 27th Canadian Infantry Brigade in West Germany as part of the NATO force. The unit returned to Canada in 1955 and was headquartered in Edmonton; in October, it was designated as the First Canadian Infantry Brigade Group. It moved into the Currie Barracks in Calgary in 1958.

The unit was redesignated 1 Combat Group in 1972, 1 Canadian Brigade Group in 1976, then 1 Canadian Mechanized Brigade Group in 1992. In 1989 at the height of the Cold War the 1st Canadian Mechanized Infantry Division consisted of three brigades, one of them being the 1st Canadian Brigade Group. It had the following structure:

Its headquarters were relocated at Steele Barracks in Edmonton in 1997.

As part of Operation Reassurance, 1 CMBG sent a contingent of approximately 200 personnel for Task Force Kandahar Headquarters for a nine-month rotation starting February 2009 and sent approximately 2500 personnel for the task force in September 2009 for a six-month tour.

== Composition ==
The units that comprise 1 CMBG, as at 11 September 2026, are:

Unit	Type	Locations
Lord Strathcona's Horse (Royal Canadians)	Armoured	CFB Edmonton
1 Combat Engineer Regiment	Armoured combat engineers	CFB Edmonton
1 Signal Regiment	Military communications	CFB Edmonton
1st Battalion, Princess Patricia's Canadian Light Infantry	Mechanized infantry	CFB Edmonton
2nd Battalion, Princess Patricia's Canadian Light Infantry	Mechanized infantry	CFB Shilo
1 Service Battalion	Combat service support	CFB Edmonton

As part of the Canadian Army's major restructuring in September 2026, 1 CMBG gave up its artillery regiment – 1st Regiment, Royal Canadian Horse Artillery – and its light infantry battalion – 3rd Battalion, Princess Patricia's Canadian Light Infantry – to the 1st Canadian Artillery Brigade and the 3rd Canadian Light Infantry Regiment respectively.

1 CMBG is colocated with, and frequently operates alongside, three regular force units which are not part of the formation:

408 Tactical Helicopter Squadron of 1 Wing
1 Field Ambulance of Canadian Forces Health Services Group
1 Military Police Regiment of Canadian Forces Military Police

== See also ==
- Military history of Canada
- History of the Canadian Army
- Canadian Forces
- List of armouries in Canada
