= 1 Combat Engineer Regiment =

- 1^{er} Régiment du génie de combat (French)
- Royal Canadian Engineers
- Active: 1977–present
- Country: Canada
- Branch: Canadian Army
- Type: Combat engineers
- Part of: 1 Canadian Mechanized Brigade Group
- Garrison/HQ: CFB Edmonton
- Motto: Ubique
- March: "Wings"
- Engagements: War in Afghanistan: Operation Enduring Freedom
- Website: www.canada.ca/en/army/corporate/3-canadian-division/1-combat-engineer-regiment.html

Commanders
- Commanding officer: LCol D. Amundsen
- Regimental sergeant major: CWO K. Smith

Insignia
- NATO Map Symbol

1 Combat Engineer Regiment (Note: Like most numbered Canadian Forces units, the regiment is only known as "1 Combat Engineer Regiment" and not "1st Combat Engineer Regiment".) (1 CER, French: 1^{er} Régiment du génie de combat) is a Regular Force regiment of the Royal Canadian Engineers (RCE) commanded by a lieutenant-colonel. Its headquarters is in the Patton Building at CFB Edmonton (Steele Barracks), Alberta, and it is assigned to 1 Canadian Mechanized Brigade Group.

== History ==
1 CER was continually involved with rotations to Afghanistan as part of the ongoing war on terror. Due to the regiment's special armoured engineer capability, every Canadian rotation since 2006 had a minimum of an armoured troop from 1 CER attached.

1 CER had six soldiers killed in Afghanistan.

== Organization ==
Sub-unit	Size	Composition
Regimental Headquarters	50	Command team (commanding officer, deputy commanding officer, regimental sergeant major, adjutant) headquarters troop (operations and training, signals, drivers, library, RSM assistant.)
11 Field Squadron	60	Squadron headquarters, field troops (stood down in 2016, stood up again in 2020)
12 Field Squadron	70	Squadron Headquarters, jump troop, field troop
13 C-IED Squadron	0	This squadron is not currently active. it was closed when 11 Fd Sqn was stood back up in July 2020 it was organized as a field squadron, as an armoured engineer squadron, and as a counter-IED squadron.
17 Armoured Squadron	60	Squadron headquarters, armoured training cadre, armoured engineer troop
15 Combat Support Squadron	80	Squadron headquarters, heavy equipment troop, resource troop, construction troop, dive troop, explosive ordnance disposal
18 Administration Squadron	120	Squadron headquarters, orderly room, padre, maintenance troop, logistics troop, family support services

== Armoured engineers ==
1 CER is different from other CERs as it holds the Canadian Army's armoured engineer capability. Formerly this was provided by the Badger Armoured Engineer Vehicle (AEV) Since 2018 the Badger AEV has been replaced by a Leopard 2–based AEV that is known in Canadian service as the AEV2 (still commonly called the Badger, or Badger 2).

== Order of precedence ==
Preceded by First in precedence of Canadian Military Engineers	1 Combat Engineer Regiment	Succeeded by *2 Combat Engineer Regiment
