= CFB Edmonton =

Canadian Forces base in Alberta

Canadian Forces Base Edmonton CFB Edmonton / BFC Edmonton (French)
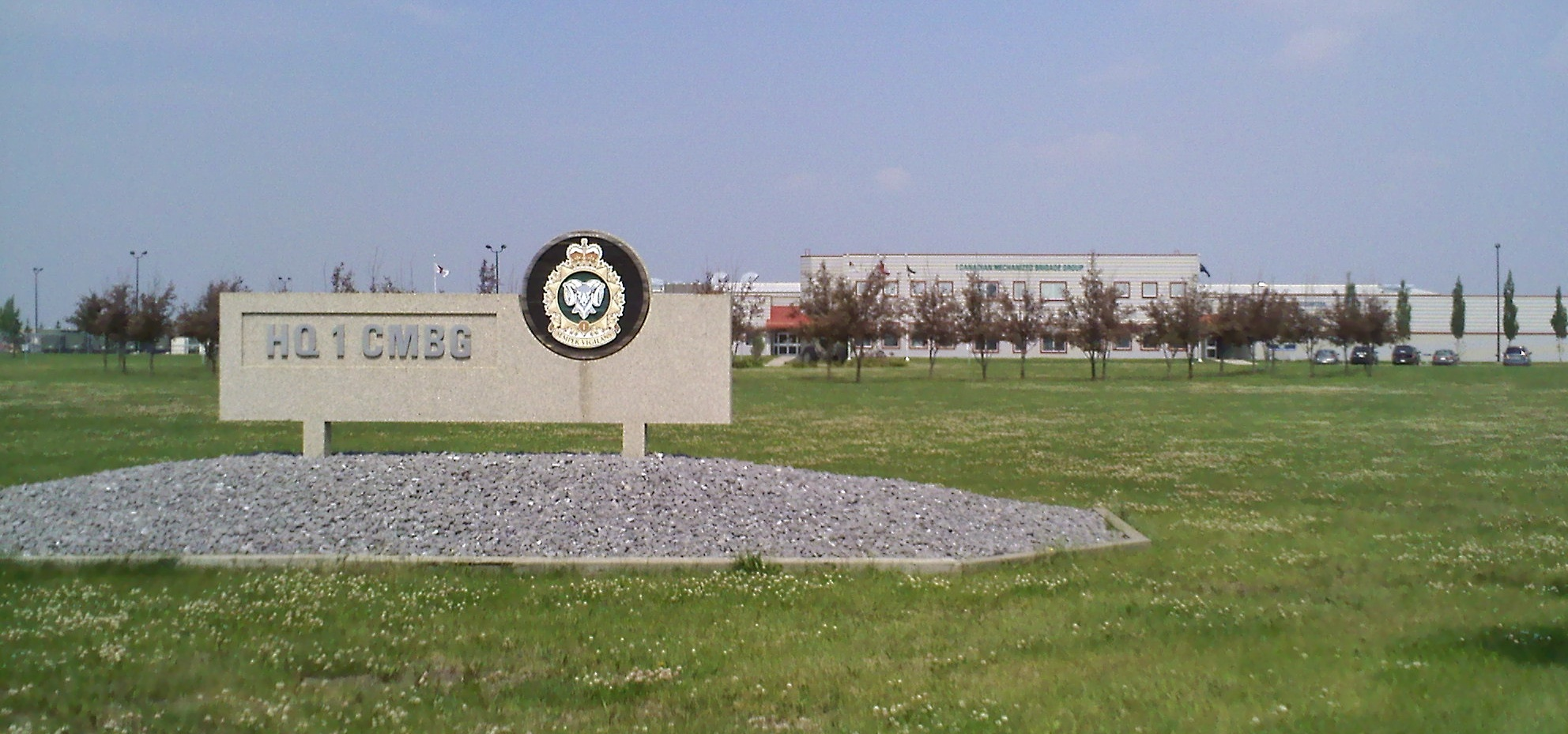
- 1 Canadian Mechanized Brigade Group at CFB Edmonton
- IATA: none; ICAO: CYED; WMO: 71121

Summary
- Airport type: Military
- Owner: Department of National Defence
- Operator: Department of National Defence
- Location: Sturgeon County, near Edmonton, Alberta
- Built: 1955
- Commander: Lieutenant-Colonel John Southen
- Occupants: 1st Canadian Division
- Time zone: Alberta Time (UTC−06:00)
- Elevation AMSL: 2,257 ft (688 m)
- Coordinates: 53°40′09″N 113°28′32″W
- Website: Canadian Forces Base Edmonton

Map
- Location in Alberta CYED (Canada)

Helipads
Number	Length		Surface
Number	ft	m	Surface
03H/21H	148 × 492	45 × 150	Asphalt
- Source: Canada Flight Supplement; Environment Canada

Canadian Forces Base (CFB) Edmonton, commonly referred to as CFB Edmonton is a Canadian Forces base in Sturgeon County adjacent to the City of Edmonton in Alberta, Canada. It is also known as Edmonton Garrison or "Steele Barracks", and listed in the Canada Flight Supplement as "Edmonton/Namao Heliport".

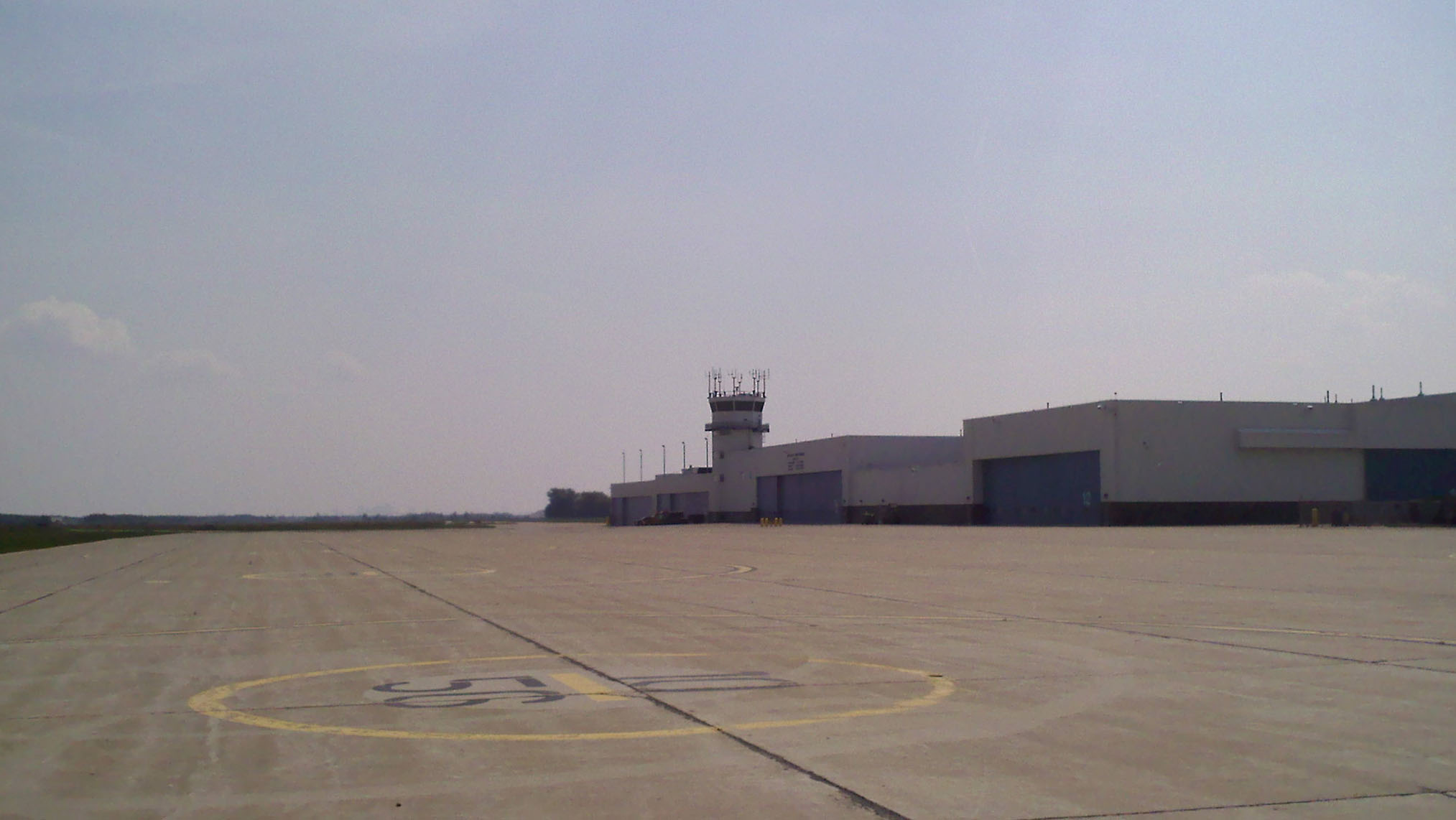
Helipads, and airside air traffic control tower, at CFB Edmonton

== History ==
RCAF Station Edmonton was established at Blatchford Field, a few kilometres south from where CFB Edmonton would eventually be established. The airfield was established in 1927 as a private and commercial interest by bush pilots, with support from the mayor of Edmonton, airfield namesake Kenny Blatchford, opening a few months after he ended his term as mayor with his election as a member of Parliament representing the city. The airfield became important to the opening up and development of the Canadian north, while also cementing Edmonton's place as the "Gateway to the North".

During the Second World War, Blatchford Field became a Royal Canadian Air Force (RCAF) training station under the British Commonwealth Air Training Plan. No. 16 Elementary Flying Training School (No. 16 EFTS) and No. 2 Air Observers School (No. 2 AOS) used the aerodrome. The RCAF also ran No. 4 Initial Training School (No. 4 ITS) which was a ground school at the University of Alberta. No. 16 EFTS closed in 1942, and No. 2 AOS closed in 1944. After No. 2 AOS closed, the station formally became known as RCAF Station Edmonton. Many RCAF squadrons and units were located here, including a survival school and the RCAF Winter Experimental Establishment (WEE). A United States Army Air Forces (USAAF) B-29 bomber detachment also used the station.

During the war, the airfield was a major factor in supporting the Allies of World War II, becoming a staging point for the U.S. defence of Alaska, as well as a major waypoint of the Northwest Staging Route supplying equipment and aircraft to the Soviet military. Aircraft had to be ferried, and transport aircraft used the aerodrome to support the construction of the Alaska Highway. Air traffic increased significantly, and flying activities were becoming hazardous. Since the old airfield could not be expanded because of its proximity to the city of Edmonton, the U.S. Government built a new air facility at Namao, about 11 km (6.8 mi) north of the city. The United States Army Corps of Engineers built two runways at the base, 03/21 and 12/30, both 2,100 m (6,890 ft) long and Canada's longest at the time. The Americans ran the Namao airfield until the end of the war when the Canadian government took it over. With time, RCAF Station Edmonton also developed severe limitations at Blatchford, and on 1 October 1955 all RCAF Squadrons and support units were transferred to the "new" RCAF Station Namao. Blatchford Field was turned over to the Edmonton municipal government and became the commercial Edmonton City Centre (Blatchford Field) Airport.

During the Cold War, RCAF Station Namao was used by the United States Strategic Air Command, which constructed a "nose dock" for servicing the nose and wings of heavy jet bombers and tankers on the south side of the airfield. The station also hosted the Edmonton Rescue Coordination Centre, and served as home base for UN Food Aid flights, delivering aid to Ethiopia, Somalia, and Bosnia. Because Namao at that time had a 4,200-metre (13,780 ft) runway, 12/30, NASA designated it an emergency Space Shuttle landing site.

In 1968, when Canada's armed services were amalgamated, RCAF Station Namao was re-designated Canadian Forces Base Edmonton (Lancaster Park) and was under command of the new Air Transport Command and later Air Command.

Federal budget cuts forced the command of the air station to be transferred to Land Force Command in 1994. CFB Edmonton (Lancaster Park)/18 Wing Edmonton was re-designated CFB Edmonton.

Although both runways are still visible they are no longer in use except for a 148 ft × 492 ft (45 m × 150 m) section of 03/21 used by helicopters.

In 2010–2011, the Government of Canada announced the construction of new facilities for visiting Canadian Armed Forces members training at CFB Edmonton.

In April 2025, the units that constituted CFB Edmonton (Operations Service, Technical Services, Personnel Services, and Corporate Services) were re-combined into CFB Edmonton. This reversed a change that had taken place in 2013, which had split the base into several units.

== Units ==
These units are headquartered at CFB Edmonton:

- 3rd Canadian Division
  - 1 Canadian Mechanized Brigade Group
    - Lord Strathcona's Horse (Royal Canadians)
    - 1 Combat Engineer Regiment
    - 1 Signal Regiment
    - 1st Battalion, Princess Patricia's Canadian Light Infantry
    - 3rd Battalion, Princess Patricia's Canadian Light Infantry
    - 1 Service Battalion
  - 3rd Canadian Division Support Group
  - D Company, 3rd Canadian Division Training Centre
  - 6 Intelligence Company
- 1 Military Police Regiment
- 1 Field Ambulance
- 1 Dental Unit Detachment Edmonton
- 408 Tactical Helicopter Squadron
- 4th Canadian Ranger Patrol Group

== Today ==
The principal function of the CFB Edmonton today is to field a general-purpose combat-effective mechanized brigade group, or any portion thereof, ready for deployment to a minimal-intensity battlefield in accordance with assigned tasks.

CFB Edmonton is the headquarters of 3rd Canadian Division, the highest army authority in western Canada, and 1 Canadian Mechanized Brigade Group (1 CMBG), the only Regular Force brigade group in the region. The base is at Steele Barracks (named for Sir Sam Steele) just north of the city. The area formerly known as CFB Griesbach within the city itself is no longer operational. All buildings and land were sold and are no longer Crown assets. The final closure was announced by Minister Peter MacKay in 2012. The base as a collective is an important part of the community surrounding Edmonton and is home to some of the most prestigious and experienced units in the Canadian Military.

The 3rd Battalion, Princess Patricia's Canadian Light Infantry, along with elements of Lord Strathcona's Horse (Royal Canadians) and 1 Combat Engineer Regiment (all part of 1 CMBG) were chosen to be a part of Canada's military response to the September 11, 2001 attacks and were deployed on combat operations to Afghanistan (including Operation Anaconda) in 2001 and 2002. Units from the base were deployed to Kandahar, Afghanistan, as part of the Canadian Forces command takeover in that area as well. Units from Edmonton were also deployed on domestic operations such as to assist with the Red River Flood in 1997 (where the entire 1 CMBG was deployed) and, more recently, as a part of Operation Peregrine in response to the forest fires in British Columbia in 2003. Units from CFB Edmonton were also deployed on numerous peacekeeping operations, including to Bosnia and Kosovo, among others.

At the end of March 2010 there were 4,237 regular military, 905 reserve Class A, B, and C forces, and 665 civilian workers at CFB Edmonton. CFB Edmonton has around one-third of the Canadian army's fighting power.

In February 2012, the Alberta government, the federal government and military officials in Ottawa and Edmonton discussed the use of the runway for medical evacuation flights with the planned closure of Edmonton City Centre Airport. Alberta Deputy Premier Doug Horner said that he had spoken with the Minister of National Defence, Peter MacKay, and the Minister of Public Works, Rona Ambrose, for further discussion. It was ultimately decided to operate all medical flights out of a purpose-built facility at the Edmonton International Airport.

On June 7, 2013, the base hosted the raising of a rainbow flag to kick off Edmonton Pride, the first time that the flag was flown on a Canadian military base.

CFB Edmonton also participated in Operation Unifier in Ukraine, 2015–2016.

In August 2016 CFB Edmonton troops joined the NATO mission in Poland, Operation Reassurance.

On 10 September 2026, the Canadian Army was went through a reorganization in which it was changed from geographic divisions and instead made into mandate-driven divisions. 3rd Canadian Division became 1st Canadian Division and the division headquarters was changed to CFB Edmonton.

== Canadian Forces Service Prison and Detention Barracks (CFSPDB) ==
CFB Edmonton is also the location for Canada's only military prison. The prison hosts all military offenders serving disciplinary sentences longer than 14 days. Prisoners are forbidden to speak with other inmates, smoke or have visitors until they earn 112 marks, which are given out at a maximum of eight per day, but fewer for misbehaviour. In 2018 the number of inmates had declined, and the 25-cell prison sat empty most of the time.
