= Princess Pat =

Princess Pat may refer to:

- Princess Pat (song), a 1917 North American song
- The Princess Pat, an operetta by Victor Herbert
- Princess Pat (brand), cosmetic company
- Patrice Munsel, an operatic soprano nicknamed "Princess Pat"
- SS Princess Patricia, a cruise ship in the Princess Cruises fleet
- Princess Pat Stakes, American horse race

== See also ==
- Princess Patricia of Connaught
- Princess Patricia's Canadian Light Infantry
