= Operation Harpoon =

Operation Harpoon may refer to:

- Operation Harpoon (1942), an Allied convoy sent to supply Malta in the Axis-dominated central Mediterranean Sea
- Operation Harpoon (2002), a Canadian-American operation against the Taliban in the Arma mountains of Afghanistan
- Operation Harpoon, an operation by Israeli Mossad and Shurat HaDin targeting terrorist money networks

== See also ==
- Operation Harpune, a major German deception plan of 1941 to conceal preparations for Operation Barbarossa
