= Princess Patricia's Canadian Light Infantry =

Canadian military unit

- Badge of the regiment
- Founded: 10 August 1914
- Country: Canada
- Branch: Canadian Expeditionary Force; Canadian Army
- Type: Infantry
- Role: Mechanized infantry (two battalions); Light infantry (one battalion)
- Size: Three battalions
- Part of: Royal Canadian Infantry Corps
- Garrison/HQ: RHQ: Edmonton; 1st Battalion: Edmonton; 2nd Battalion: Shilo; 3rd Battalion: Edmonton
- Nicknames: The Pats, Patricia's, The Patricia's, VP, The Picklies or Princess Pat's, Dirty Patricias, The Vicious Patricias
- Colours: 2nd Battalion entitled to wear US PUC streamer on regimental colour
- March: Quick: "Has Anyone Seen the Colonel / Tipperary / Mademoiselle from Armentières" (medley); Slow: "Lili Marlene"; 1st Battalion: "The Maple Leaf"; 2nd Battalion: "March Winnipeg"; 3rd Battalion: "Imperial Echoes"
- Engagements: First World War; Second World War; Korean War; Croatian War of Independence: Operation Medak Pocket; War in Afghanistan
- Decorations: US Presidential Unit Citation (2nd Battalion); Commander-in-Chief Unit Commendation: 2nd Bn PPCLI Battle Group: Medak Pocket, Croatia, Operation Harmony, 1993; Commander-in-Chief Unit Commendation: 3rd Bn PPCLI Battle Group: Afghanistan, Operation Apollo, 2002; Commander-in-Chief Unit Commendation: 1st Bn PPCLI Battle Group: Afghanistan, Operation Archer, 2006
- Battle honours: See #Battle honours
- Website: www.ppcli.com

Commanders
- Colonel-in-chief: Adrienne Clarkson
- Colonel of the Regiment: Brigadier-General R.R. Romses
- Abbreviation: PPCLI

Princess Patricia's Canadian Light Infantry (PPCLI, generally referred to as the Patricia's) is one of the three Regular Force infantry regiments of the Canadian Army of the Canadian Armed Forces. Formed in 1914, it is named for Princess Patricia of Connaught, daughter of the then-Governor General of Canada. The regiment is composed of three battalions, for a total of 2,000 soldiers. The PPCLI is the main lodger unit of Canadian Forces Base (CFB) Edmonton in Alberta and CFB Shilo in Manitoba, and attached to the 1st Canadian Division; as such, it serves as the "local" regular infantry regiment for much of Western Canada. The Loyal Edmonton Regiment (LER), a Reserve Force battalion, is affiliated with the PPCLI but is not formally part of it. As part of this affiliation, the LER carries the designation '4th Battalion, Princess Patricia's Canadian Light Infantry'.

The PPCLI is a "British-style" regiment which serves as the spiritual home and repository of customs and traditions for a number of battalions that do not necessarily serve together operationally. Its three battalions are independent operational entities. Two battalions – 1st and 2nd – serve with 1 Canadian Mechanized Brigade Group (1 CMBG) while the 3rd Battalion is now part of the 3rd Canadian Light Infantry Regiment. The regimental title is honorific: two of the battalions are mechanized infantry and the unit has never been organized as a traditional light infantry regiment.

The PPCLI was raised on the initiative of Captain Andrew Hamilton Gault in 1914 as part of the British Empire's war effort for the First World War. It was the first Canadian infantry unit to enter the theatre of operations, arriving in France on December 21, 1914. The regiment served with both the British and Canadian Expeditionary Forces, and was retained as a regular infantry regiment after the war. The regiment mobilized again in the Second World War, provided three battalions in succession for the Korean War, and most recently fought in the War in Afghanistan. The regiment has also provided units for numerous NATO operations and United Nations peacekeeping missions. The regiment has received 39 battle honours, three Commander-in-Chief Unit Commendations and the United States Presidential Unit Citation.

== Structure ==
The regiment is composed of three battalions, all of which are Regular Force units and part of the 1 Canadian Mechanized Brigade Group (1CMBG). Each battalion is a distinct operational entity in the Canadian Forces' order of battle. The two first battalions are mechanized infantry, while the third one is light infantry. The regimental headquarters are on CFB Edmonton.

Battalion	Base	Brigade	Type
1st Battalion	CFB Edmonton (Alberta)	1 Canadian Mechanized Brigade Group	Mechanized infantry
2nd Battalion	CFB Shilo (Manitoba)	1 Canadian Mechanized Brigade Group	Mechanized infantry
3rd Battalion	CFB Edmonton (Alberta)	1 Canadian Mechanized Brigade Group	Light infantry

NATO Map Symbols
1 PPCLI	1 CMBG
2 PPCLI	1 CMBG
3 PPCLI	1 CMBG

=== 1st Battalion ===
The 1st Battalion, Princess Patricia's Canadian Light Infantry (1PPCLI) is at Steele Barracks, CFB Edmonton, Alberta. 1 PPCLI is a mechanized infantry battalion of the Regular Force and uses the LAV 6.0 (light armoured vehicle) as its primary fighting vehicle. The battalion is made of three rifle companies, a combat support company comprising reconnaissance and signals platoons as well as a sniper group, and an administration company. The current commanding officer is Lieutenant-Colonel M.O. Litzenberger, CD and the regimental sergeant-major (RSM) is Chief Warrant Officer C.J. Nevell, CD.

=== 2nd Battalion ===
The 2nd Battalion, Princess Patricia's Canadian Light Infantry (2PPCLI) is based at Kapyong Barracks in CFB Shilo, Manitoba. The battalion is a mechanized infantry unit of the Regular Force and is part of the 1CMBG. The battalion is composed of three rifle companies (A, B and C), one combat support company, and one command and administration company. Each rifle company is made of three platoons and a headquarters element, and has 15 LAV 6.0 infantry fighting vehicles. The combat support company is composed of a reconnaissance platoon and a signals platoon. The current commanding officer is Lieutenant-Colonel P.S.R. Brown, CD. and the Regimental Sergeant Major (RSM) is Chief Warrant Officer T.J. Barter, CD

=== 3rd Battalion ===
The 3rd Battalion Princess Patricia's Canadian Light Infantry (3PPCLI) is based at Steele Barracks, CFB Edmonton, Alberta. The battalion is a light infantry unit of the Regular Force, and the only one in Western Canada. The battalion is composed of three rifle companies, one combat support company and one combat service support company. 3PPCLI also maintains an airborne and mountain operations capability. The current commanding officer (CO) is Lieutenant-Colonel J.M.P. Cressall, CD and the regimental sergeant major is Chief Warrant Officer K.P. Doerr, CD.

== Lineage ==
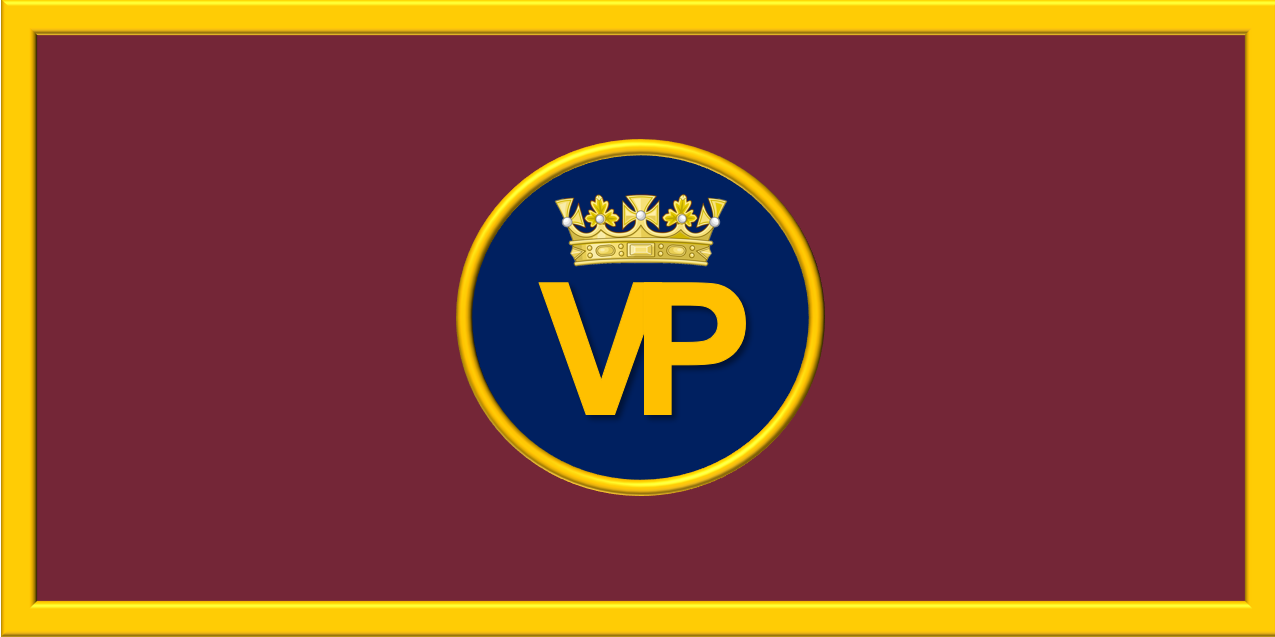
Camp flag of Princess Patricia's Canadian Light Infantry

Princess Patricia's Canadian Light Infantry originated in Ottawa, Ontario, on 10 August 1914. The Permanent Active Militia (Regular Force) component was formed on 1 April 1919 and the Canadian Expeditionary Force component of the regiment was disbanded on 30 August 1920.

Following the Second World War on 1 March 1946, the Canadian Active Service Force regiment was disbanded and the 2nd Battalion, Princess Patricia's Canadian Light Infantry, CIC was redesignated Princess Patricia's Canadian Light Infantry, CIC. On 27 June 1946, the regiment was embodied in the post-war Permanent Force (Active Force).

On 7 August 1950, the 2nd Battalion, Princess Patricia's Canadian Light Infantry, RCIC was authorized to be formed as an Active Force unit embodied in the Special Force. On 1 January 1952, it ceased to be embodied in the Canadian Army Special Force.

On 30 November 1950, the 3rd Battalion, Princess Patricia's Canadian Light Infantry, RCIC was authorized to be formed as an Active Force unit embodied in the Special Force. On 1 November 1953, it ceased to be embodied in the Canadian Army Special Force. On 8 January 1954, it was reduced to nil strength and the battalion was disbanded on 21 July 1954. On 27 April 1970, the 3rd Battalion, Princess Patricia's Canadian Light Infantry was authorized to be formed as a Regular Force unit.

=== Lineage chart ===
Lineage chart

1914	Princess Patricia's Canadian Light Infy
1918	260th Bn, Canadian Rifles, CEF (Siberia)
1919	Princess Patricia's Canadian Light Infy (Note: Permanent Active Militia component formed)
1920	CEF component disbanded	Disbanded
1939	The Princess Patricia's Canadian Light Infy, CASF
1942	Princess Patricia's Canadian Light Infy, CASF, CIC
1945	1st Canadian Infy Bn (Princess Patricia's Canadian Light Infy), CASF
1945	2nd Bn, Princess Patricia's Canadian Light Infy, CIC
1946	Princess Patricia's Canadian Light Infy, CIC	Disbanded
1950	Princess Patricia's Canadian Light Infy (1st Bn) RCIC	2nd Bn, Princess Patricia's Canadian Light Infy, RCIC	3rd Bn, Princess Patricia's Canadian Light Infy, RCIC
1952	1st Bn, Princess Patricia's Canadian Light Infy	2nd Bn, Princess Patricia's Canadian Light Infy
1953	3rd Bn, Princess Patricia's Canadian Light Infy
1954	Disbanded
1970	3rd Bn, Princess Patricia's Canadian Light Infy
1997	Perpetuates 260th Bn	Perpetuates 260th Bn	Perpetuates 260th Bn

== Perpetuations ==
On 3 November 1997, the regiment was granted the perpetuation of the 260th Battalion Canadian Rifles, Canadian Expeditionary Force (Siberia).

== History ==
=== Early history and First World War (1914–1919) ===
At the outbreak of the First World War, when Canada was lacking regular military forces, the then-Captain Andrew Hamilton Gault raised the Patricias. Hamilton Gault offered $100,000 (equivalent to $2,736,667 in 2025) to finance and equip a battalion to participate in the Canadian war effort overseas. (Note: "Princess Patricia's Canadian Light Infantry : Origin", Department of National Defence) The government temporarily accepted his offer on August 6, 1914, and officially authorized it on August 10. The Department of Militia and Defence contributed to the equipment of the unit. The charter of the regiment was signed on August 10, and the Governor General of Canada, The Duke of Connaught and Strathearn, approved the creation of the regiment.

A sandstone slab memorial at Lansdowne Park is dedicated to the founding of Princess Patricia's Canadian Light Infantry at this location in August 1914.

Lieutenant-Colonel Francis D. Farquhar was instrumental in assisting Hamilton Gault in founding the regiment. Colonel Farquhar, Military Secretary to Canada's Governor General, asked the Duke of Connaught for permission to name the regiment after his daughter, Princess Patricia of Connaught. She was pleased to accept this honour and thus Princess Patricia's were established. "Light Infantry" in the battalion name was chosen by Captain Gault, who served during the Second Boer War and liked the impression of an irregular force that the name inspired.

Farquhar and Gault moved expeditiously to mobilize the regiment. The day after authority was granted, August 11, the two men began an aggressive recruitment campaign. Due to the patriotic outpouring following the August 4 declaration of war, 3,000 applicants were recruited within eight days. By August 19 a full complement of 1,098 had been selected, of those, 1,049 had previously served in South Africa or in the British Army. Farquhar became the first commander of the battalion. The regiment's first formal parade was conducted on August 23 in Ottawa, during which Princess Patricia presented the regimental standard. Princess Patricia, Colonel-in-Chief, designed and made by hand the regimental flag to be presented on that occasion. It is a crimson flag with a circular royal blue centre. In the circle are gold initials "V P", which stands for Victoria Patricia. The regimental standard became known as the "Ric-A-Dam-Doo". This flag was carried in every regimental action during the war. It was not officially adopted as a regimental colour and consecrated as such until after the war.

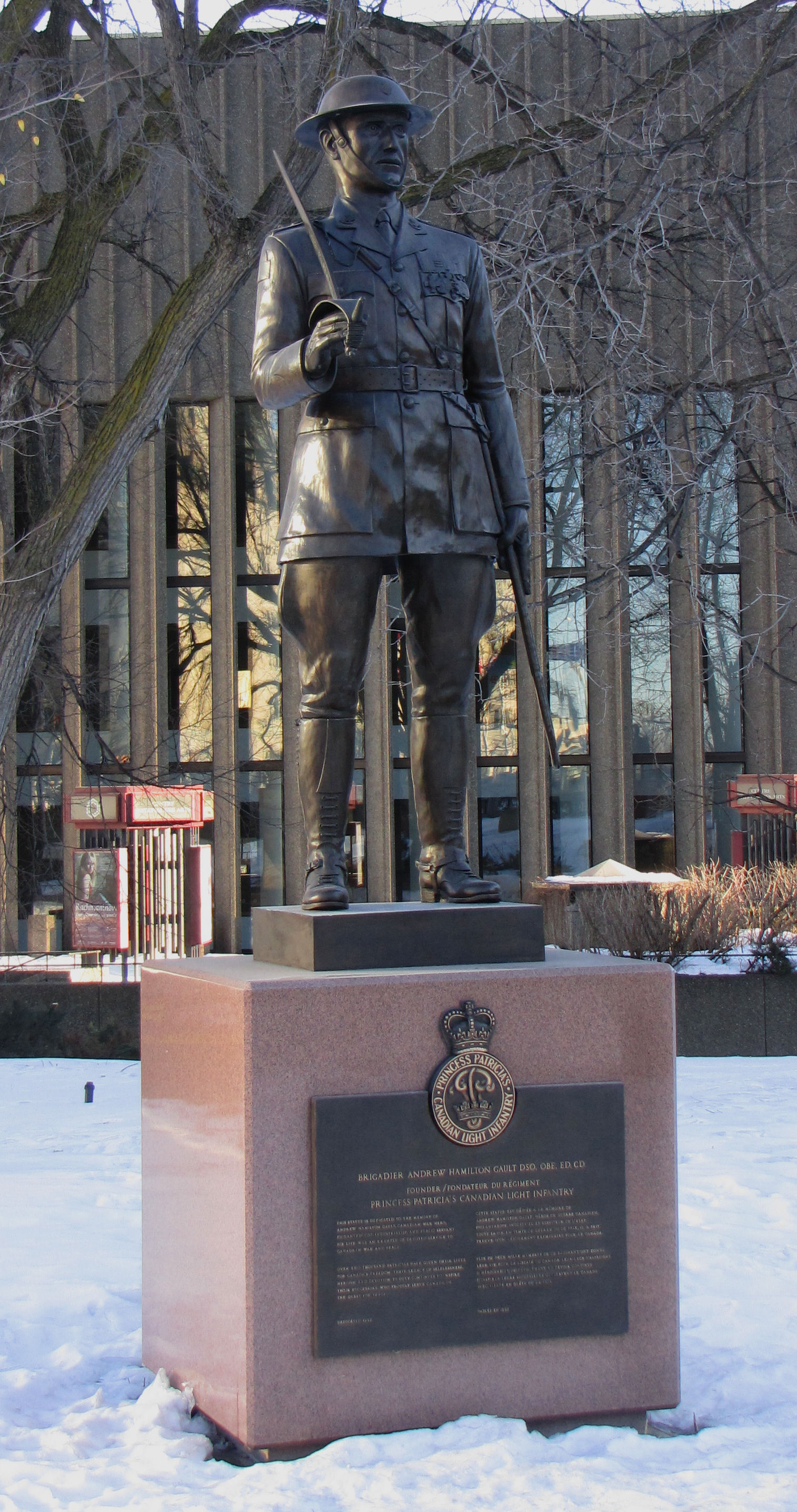
Brigadier Andrew Hamilton Gault statue, near the National Arts Centre in Ottawa

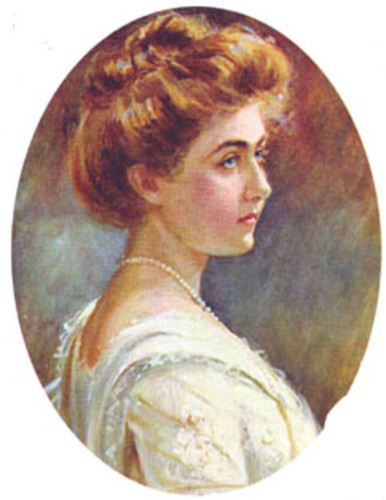
Princess Patricia of Connaught

As a Canadian regiment mobilized in a time of wartime shortages, the regiment was equipped with weapons from a variety of sources. Private soldiers initially carried the Canadian .303 Ross rifle, while officers and non-commissioned officers normally carried the 1914 Colt Canadian-contract .45 M1911 pistol.

The regiment left Ottawa on August 28 and boarded the SS Megantic in Montreal, Quebec. However, because of enemy action in the Atlantic Ocean, the regiment had to disembark at Lévis, Quebec. During the period of training at Lévis, following extensive tests on the Ross rifle, the Patricias issued the first of what would be many damning reports of the suitability of the Ross rifle for combat. The regiment finally left on September 27 from Quebec City on board the Royal George for England in company with the rest of the first Canadian contingent.

Upon arrival at their camp on the Salisbury Plain, England, on October 18 the regiment was first stationed at Bustard Camp near Stonehenge. On November 16 the unit joined the 80th Brigade of the British Expeditionary Force at Winchester. At that time the regiment abandoned the troubled Ross rifle in favour of the British Lee–Enfield. On 20 December, the regiment departed for the port of Southampton with the rest of the brigade and embarked for France arriving the next day. On this date the PPCLI was the only Canadian infantry unit on the battlefield; only the 1st Canadian Medical Corps was there before.

The Patricias first took their place in the trenches on January 6, 1915, at a location known to the British Army's soldiers as "Dickiebush". When Farquhar was killed in action at St Eloi on March 20, he was replaced by Lieutenant-Colonel H. Buller, another British regular, who had served with him on the staff of the governor general before the war.

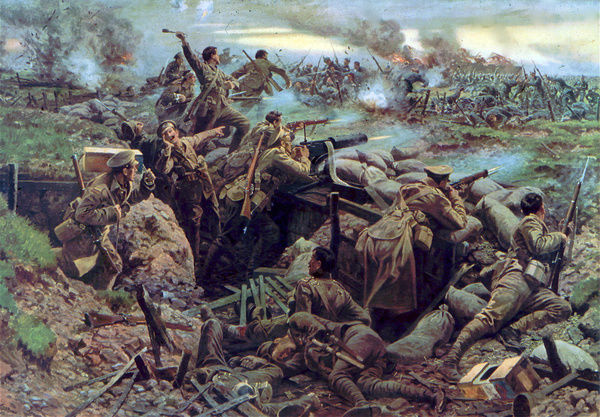
PPCLI at The Battle of Frezenberg

On May 8, the stout defence of Bellewaerde Ridge during the Battle of Frezenberg established the reputation of the Patricias but at tremendous cost. When they came out of the line the 700 men that had started the battle had been reduced to just 150 who were battle ready. The tattered remains were commanded by a lieutenant, all other officers having been killed or wounded. The phrase "holding up the whole damn line" became one of unit's unofficial mottos for the regiment. This action was immortalised in the painting Canadians at Ypres by William Barnes Wollen. As of 2025 the painting is on show with a diorama at the Military Museums in Calgary.

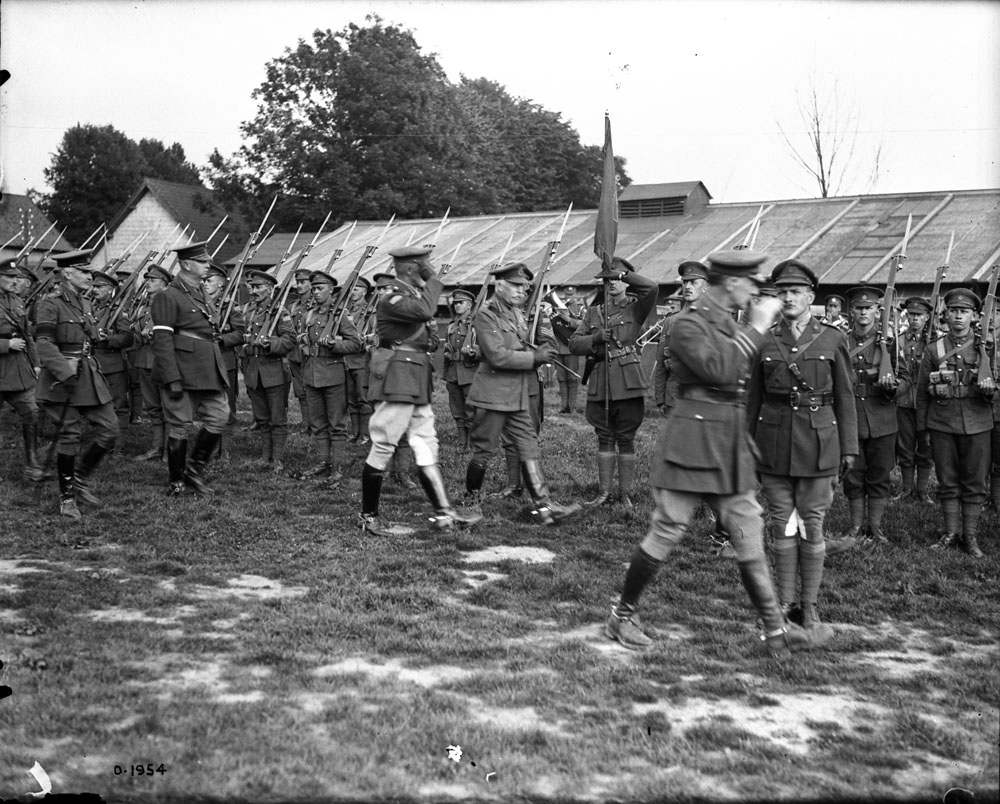
Prince Arthur, Duke of Connaught and Strathearn, inspecting the PPCLI guard of honour, September 1917.

The PPCLI served for a year with the 80th Brigade before joining the new 7th Brigade within the 3rd Canadian Division on December 22. In 1916 the regiment fought major battles at Mount Sorrel and on the Somme. It was not until October 1916 that the first Canadian, Lieutenant-Colonel Agar Adamson, was appointed to command the regiment. In 1917 as part of the Canadian Corps, the regiment took part in the Battle of Vimy Ridge on April 9, and Passchendaele later the same year. In 1918 the regiment fought at the Battle of Amiens, Jigsaw Wood, and the Battle of the Canal du Nord as part of the great battles of the Hundred Days Offensive that ended the war. The 4th Company PPCLI entered Mons with other Canadian troops in the early morning before the armistice of 11 November 1918 took effect at 11 am.

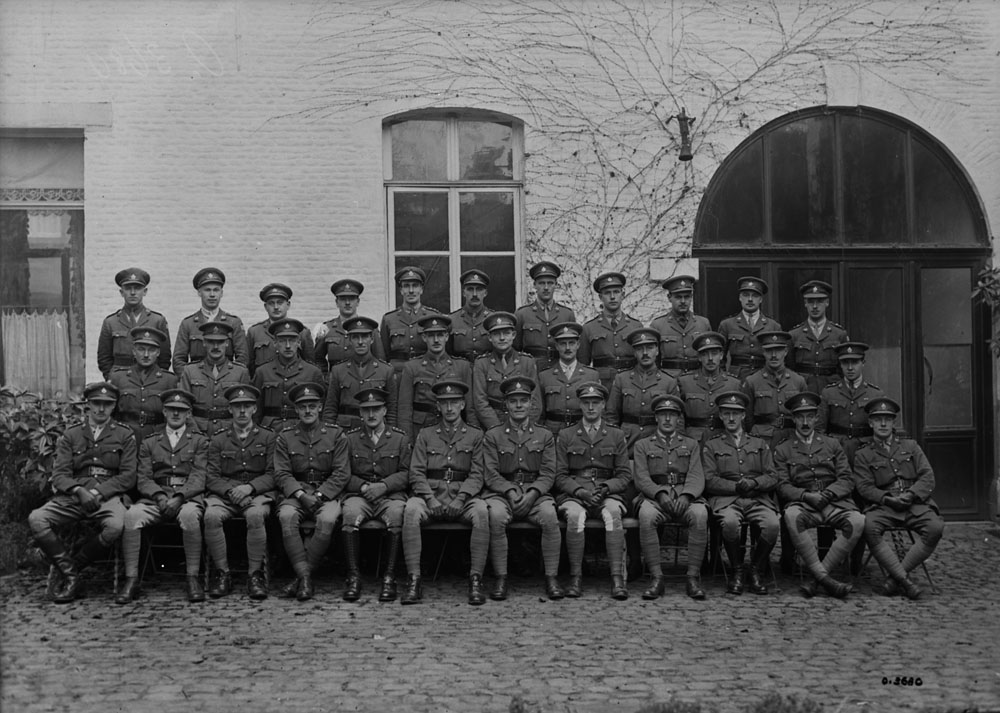
Officers of the PPCLI in Mons, France, November 1918.

During the Battle of Passchendaele Sergeant George Harry Mullin earned the Victoria Cross, the highest honour in the British Empire. Sergeant Robert Spall earned the regiment's second Victoria Cross at Parvilliers on August 12 and 13, 1918.

A former Patricia, Lieutenant Hugh McKenzie, who had risen from private to company sergeant-major before accepting his commission and transferring to the Canadian Machine Gun Corps, was awarded the Victoria Cross posthumously for his actions during Passchendaele. He had already won the Empire's second-highest award for gallantry, the Distinguished Conduct Medal, while serving with the regiment as well as the French Croix de Guerre. On 30 October 1917, he was a member of the 7th Canadian Machine Gun Company, Canadian Machine Gun Corps, leading a section of four machine guns in support of the regiment. Seeing that one of the PPCLI companies was hesitating to advance in the face of a German machine gun position on dominating ground, he handed command of his troops to an NCO and went to rally the men of his old regiment. McKenzie organized an attack and captured the enemy position. Once on the position, however, he realized that it was itself under dominating enemy machine gun fire from a nearby pillbox. McKenzie organized parties to capture the pillbox by making both frontal and flanking attacks. He was killed while leading the frontal attack. When the awarded of his Victoria Cross was announced in the London Gazette on 12 February 1918, his surname was misspelled as "Mackenzie."

On February 4, 1915, Private Guy Dwyer became the Patricias' first combat death of the war. The last of the Patricias killed in action was likely Corporal Percy Wainwright Carleton on 10 November 1918. In total 1,272 officers and enlisted men of the Patricias were killed and 82 officers and enlisted men were captured during the war.

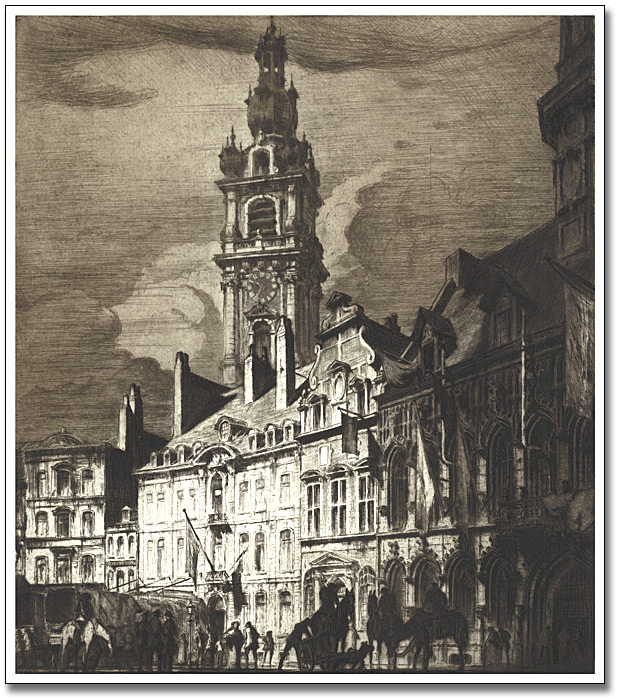
The Canadians entering Mons

The 3rd Canadian Division CEF distinguishing patch of the PPCLI

The 260th Battalion, Canadian Rifles, CEF (Siberia) was authorized on 1 November 1918 in Victoria, B.C. and embarked for Russia on 29 December 1918. It served with the 16th Infantry Brigade as part of the Allied Forces in eastern Russia until 9 May 1919. The battalion was disbanded on 15 November 1920. The service of the 260th Battalion, CEF (Siberia) resulted in Princess Patricia's Canadian Light Infantry being awarded the battle honour Siberia, 1918-1919.

=== Between the wars (1918–1939) ===
On March 20, 1919, the regiment became a component of the Permanent Active Militia. In 1920 the regimental headquarters, A Company and D Company were relocated to Fort Osborne Barracks, in Winnipeg, Manitoba, while B Company relocated to Esquimalt, British Columbia. The period between the two wars was a recession period for the Canadian Armed Forces, and the regiment lost 209 soldiers in 1924.

In 1926 a group of officers and friends of the PPCLI erected a plaque in the chapel of a women's monastery on Echo Drive, across the Rideau Canal from Lansdowne Park which was dedicated to the memory of the war dead and veterans of the PPCLI during the First World War. It was moved to St. Clement Chapel, Albion Road in 1985, then to St. Clement's new premises at 87 Mann Avenue in 1993.

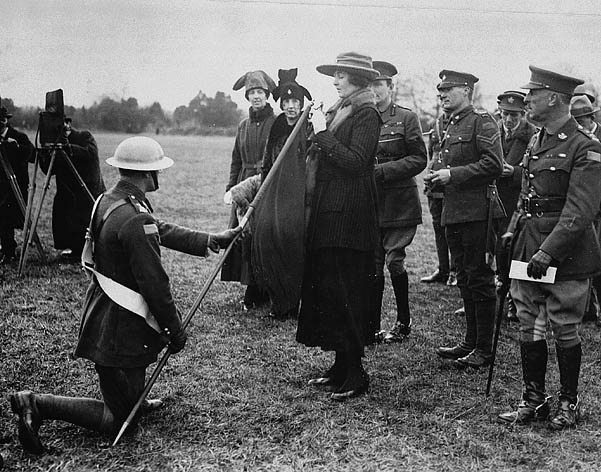
Princess Patricia inspecting the PPCLI in 1919

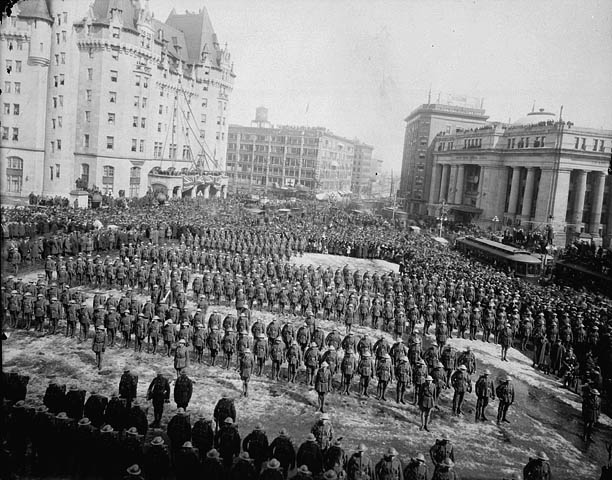
The return of Princess Patricia's Canadian Light Infantry, Ottawa, March 1919

=== Second World War (1939–1945) ===
World War II began in Europe on September 1, 1939, and the Parliament of Canada declared war between Canada and Germany on September 10, 1939. The same day, the Patricias were mobilized for active service. The regiment recruited in Winnipeg and Vancouver until October. The regiment sailed from Halifax, Nova Scotia on the December 21, 1939, arriving in Aldershot, England, as part of the 2nd Brigade of the 1st Canadian Infantry Division under the command of Lieutenant-Colonel W.G. Colquhoun. They spent New Year's Eve in Cove, west of Farnborough. On February 10, 1940, the colonel-in-chief, Princess Patricia, inspected her regiment for the first time in twenty-one years. The regiment spent three and a half years in United Kingdom, most of which was spent in coastal defence and training in various parts of the country.

On July 10, 1943, the PPCLI, forming part of the 1st Canadian Infantry Division and the British Eighth Army, landed in Sicily during Operation Husky. The Patricia won its first battle honours of the Second World War at Leonforte. Later, on September 4, 1943, the regiment landed and fought in Italy, advancing North for two months. The unit was slowed down by the demolished bridges and the German rear guard. In December 1943 the regiment fought during the Moro River Campaign; that year the soldiers spent Christmas in Ortona.

In May 1944, the PPCLI took part in the offensive against the Hitler Line, west of Monte Cassino, during the allied offensive against Rome. At that point, the regiment was a component of the newly formed I Canadian Corps. In August, the unit took part in the offensive against the Gothic Line and in the assaults on San Fortunato and Rimini.

On March 13, 1945, the I Canadian Corps was transferred to Northwest Europe where it joined the First Canadian Army and took part in the liberation of the Netherlands. Shortly after, the regiment captured the city of Apeldoorn, and, on May 7, 1945, it was the first allied force to enter Amsterdam, under the command of Lieutenant-Colonel Clark.

On June 1, 1945, a new battalion of the regiment was authorized to be part the Canadian Pacific Force in the campaign against Japan. Its official designation was 1st Canadian Infantry Battalion, Princess Patricia's Canadian Light Infantry, 2nd Canadian Infantry. After the destruction of Hiroshima and Nagasaki by American atomic bombs and Japan's subsequent surrender on August 15, 1945, the Pacific Force was disbanded. On September 2, the new battalion was renamed 2nd Battalion, Princess Patricia's Canadian Light Infantry, Canadian Infantry Corps and became a component of the interim force, waiting for the formation of a permanent force.

In October 1945, the regiment's serving battalion in Europe, understrength, returned to Winnipeg and was demobilized.

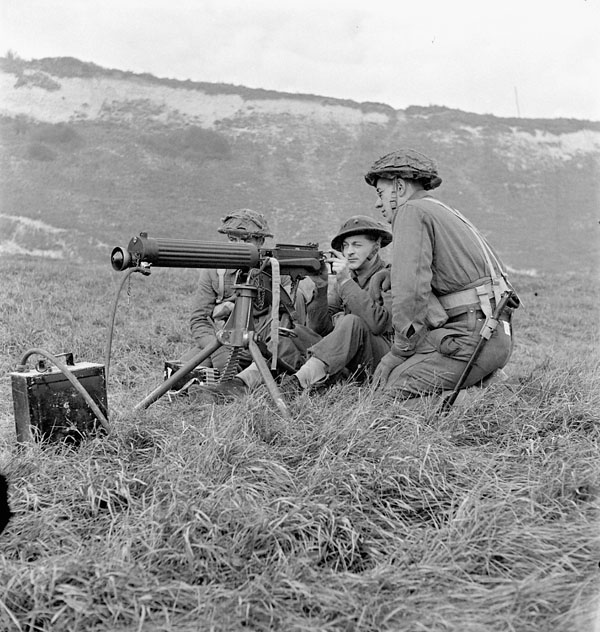
Soldiers of Princess Patricia's Canadian Light Infantry firing a Vickers machine gun during a training exercise, Eastbourne, England, December 3, 1942

Map of the Sicilian campaign operations

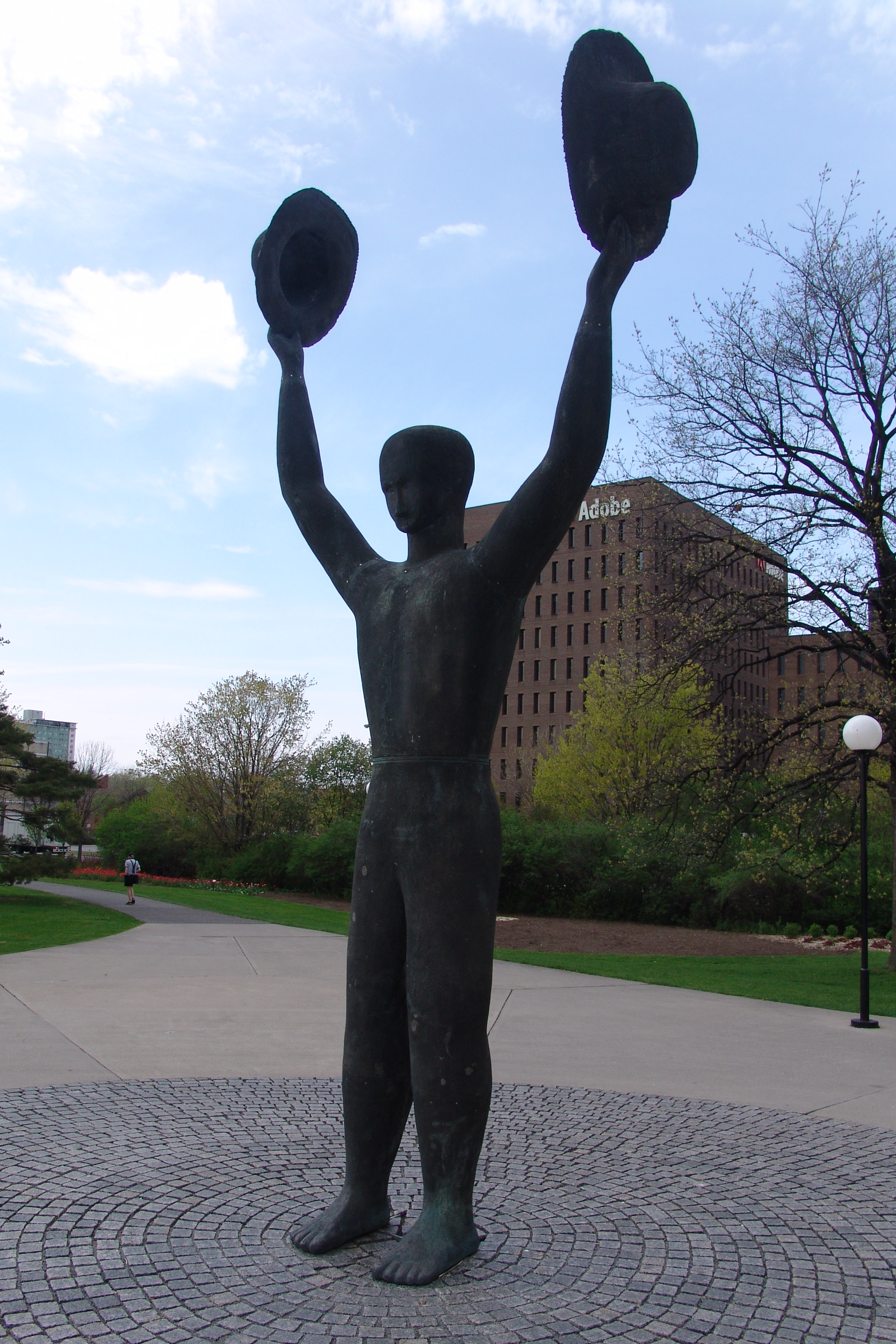
Monument given to Canada by the Netherlands for the liberation of Apeldoorn

=== After the war (1945–1950) ===
After the war, in January 1946, while the interim force was gradually disbanded and the permanent force was formed, the 2nd Battalion returned to CFB Shilo. On June 10, it was relocated to Calgary, Alberta. On March 1, 1947, the battalion was renamed from 2nd Battalion, Princess Patricia's Canadian Light Infantry, Canadian Infantry Corps to 2nd Battalion, Princess Patricia's Canadian Light Infantry.

In 1948, on the eve of the Korean War, an emphasis was put on the airborne troops and the 2nd Battalion was the first unit chosen to fill this role, on a voluntary basis. In the end, all the members of the unit, including the officers, became paratroopers; training was completed in the spring of 1949.

=== Korean War (1950–1954) ===
On August 15, 1950, the 2nd Battalion was created within the regiment to be a component of the Canadian Army Special Force in response to the North Korean invasion of South Korea; the unit adopted the designation of 2nd Battalion, Princess Patricia's Canadian Light Infantry. The new battalion trained in Calgary and at CFB Wainwright, in Alberta, before boarding the USS Private Joe P. Martinez on November 25, 1950, to Pusan in South Korea. The battalion landed in Korea in December and trained in the mountains for eight weeks before finally taking part in the war on February 6, becoming a component of the 27th British Commonwealth Brigade of the IX American Corps in the 8th US Army. The 2nd Battalion of the PPCLI was the first Canadian infantry unit to take part in the Korean War.

On April 22, 1951, Chinese forces undertook a major offensive against the United Nations forces and pierced through the first line of defence held by the ROK Army 6th Division. During the Battle of Kapyong the 2nd Battalion, PPCLI, the 3rd Battalion, Royal Australian Regiment, and A Company, 72nd Heavy Tank Battalion (US) were tasked with the defence of the Kapyong Valley. The heavily outnumbered Australian and US units held on until the afternoon of the 24th when, having suffered heavy casualties, they were withdrawn from the battlefield to occupy reserve positions, leaving the 700 men of 2 PPLCI on Hill 677 encircled and cut off from support. The 2 PPCLI held the position on Hill 677 in a last stand throughout the night of 25 April against the attacks of two PVA divisions, originally consisting of 20,000 men. The delay of the Chinese forces for three days while United Nations forces withdrew to a new defensive line saved Seoul and prevented US forces in Korea, then in general retreat, from encirclement. For their action, these three units received the United States Presidential Unit Citation and the Republic of Korea Presidential Unit Citation.

On May 25, 1951, the 2nd Battalion, PPCLI was transferred to the 25th Canadian Infantry Brigade within the 1st Commonwealth Division. In the fall, the 2nd Battalion was replaced by 1 PPCLI and returned to Calgary. Meanwhile, in Canada, a new battalion was created on November 30, 1950. This 3rd Battalion trained at CFB Wainwright, CFB Borden, and Camp Ipperwash, before sending troops with the 1st and 2nd Battalions during their tour in Korea.

In October 1951, 2 PPCLI participated in Operation Commando, taking and holding a key position on the flanks of Hill 355. They repelled a counter-attack from a large force of Chinese PVA infantry on 12 October.

The 3rd Battalion replaced the 1st Battalion in the fall of 1952, and occupied Hill 355 until late November 1952. After three months of active service the battalion was disbanded on February 8, 1954. The PPCLI was again reduced to two battalions, and the commander, regimental sergeant major, and members of the disbanded 3rd Battalion were chosen to form the new 2nd Battalion of the Canadian Guards.

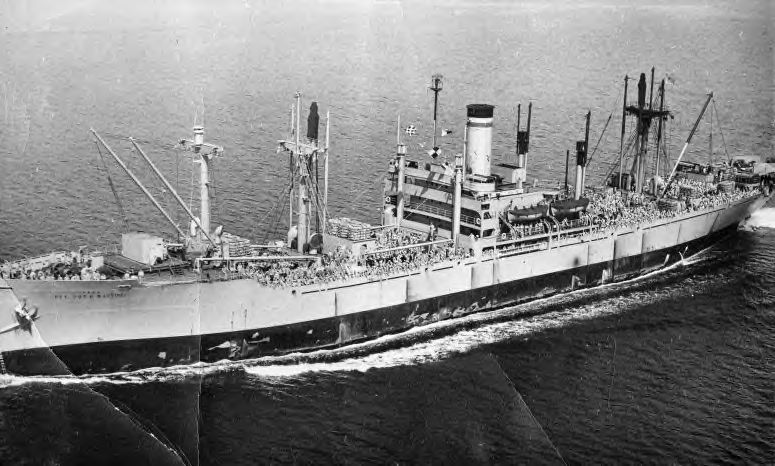
USS Private Joe P. Martinez transported the 2PPCLI to the Korean theatre of operations in 1950

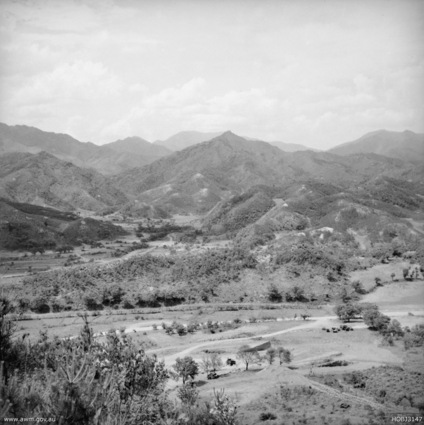
Kapyong in 1952

=== Service in Canada and Germany (1950–1988) ===
In the spring of 1950, the 1st Battalion supported civil authorities responding to floods in Manitoba.

From 1950 to 1969, Canada, as a NATO member, maintained a brigade-group in Germany. The 2nd Battalion, PPCLI served in Germany from October 1953 to the fall of 1955, when the 1st Battalion replaced it until the fall of 1957. In the fall of 1963 the 1st Battalion deployed for its second rotation until 1966. The 2nd Battalion returned in July 1984 for four years. In 1994 CFB Lahr in Germany closed, effectively ending the Canadian rotations.

=== Cold War and peacekeeping (1968–2003) ===
The 1st Battalion, Princess Patricia's Canadian Light Infantry was sent to Cyprus in 1968 within the United Nations Peacekeeping Force in Cyprus (UNFYCIP). Different infantry units including the two PPCLI battalions then undertook six-month rotations in the country until 1993. PPCLI completed 12 tours in Cyprus.

In 1970, the 1st Battalion of The Queen's Own Rifles of Canada was based in Victoria, British Columbia. Due to a reorganization, its members were rebadged to the newly recreated 3rd Battalion, Princess Patricia's Canadian Light Infantry. The regiment also increased in size when the Canadian government closed 4 Canadian Mechanized Brigade Group.

The sculpture Anti-Tank Patrol by André Gauthier was commissioned to mark the 75th anniversary of the regiment in 1989.

The Patricias served in Israel, Golan, Egypt, Lebanon, Kuwait, Iraq, Nigeria, Uganda, Congo, Vietnam, Central America, Angola, Somalia, Rwanda, Korea, Croatia, and Bosnia, for various missions.

During the Yugoslav Wars in the early 1990s, soldiers from PPCLI served in the United Nations Protection Force (UNPROFOR), the United Nations peacekeeping force in Croatia. In the autumn of 1992, The 3rd Battalion replaced the Royal 22nd Regiment in Sector North, stationed out of Camp Polom, near Pakrac. The 22nd had actually spent much of their six-month tour out of position. They were with General Lewis MacKenzie, securing the Sarajevo airport for UN relief shipments. It was replaced by a battle group of 875 members mostly from the 2nd Battalion PPCLI in 1993. The battle group was dispatched to the Medak Pocket in September 1993 to interpose themselves between Serb and Croatian forces. After the Croatians opened fire on the PPCLI troops, they became involved in an intense firefight. In 2002, Colonel Jim Calvin and his men were awarded the Commander-in-Chief Unit Commendation for their bravery. A battle group drawn mostly from 1st Battalion PPCLI replaced the 2nd in 1994; the 2nd Battalion also served with the stabilization force in 1997, 2000 and 2003, the 3rd Battalion in 2000, and the 1st Battalion in 2002 and 2003. B Company, 1st Battalion, deployed as part of Lord Strathcona's Horse (Royal Canadians) Battle Group to northwest Bosnia from July 1997 to January 1998. Elements of PPCLI served with Lord Strathcona's Horse during the 1917–1918 winter, and in 1999, the 1st Battalion sent a complete battle group to the Kosovo Force.

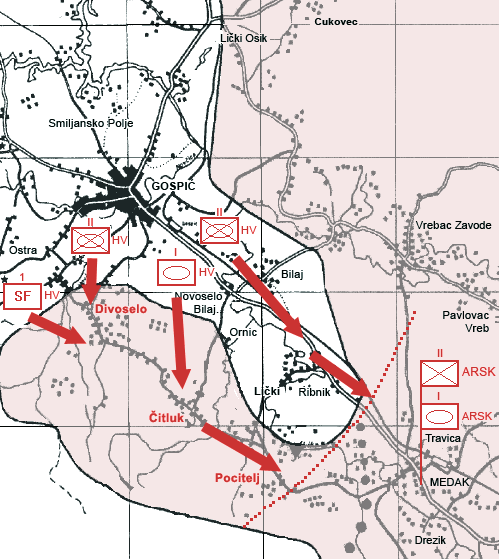
Battle of Medak Pocket

In the spring of 1997, the 1st Battalion supported civil authorities with the Manitoba floods yet again. In 1998, it was again mobilized, this time to respond to the 1998 North American ice storm in Quebec. To celebrate the announcement of the re-opening of Canada House in 1998, a detachment of the 3rd Battalion was sent to London to mount the Royal Guard at the Buckingham Palace, a rare honour. The Royal Canadian Regiment had the same honour two years later, at the re-opening.

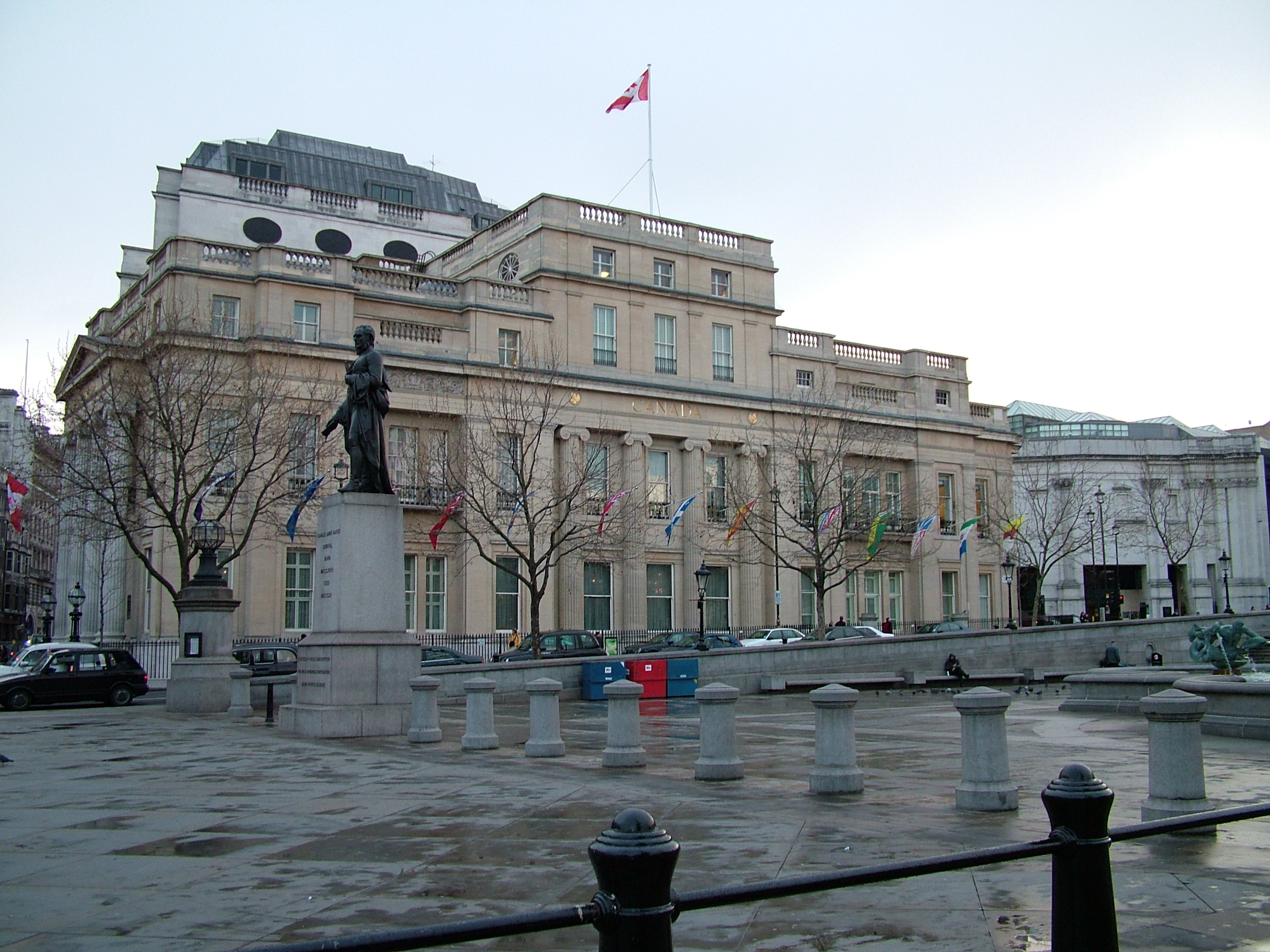
Canada House in London

=== War in Afghanistan (2001–2010) ===
==== Operation Apollo (2002–2003) ====
On January 22, 2002, during Operation Apollo, the Canadian contribution to Operation Enduring Freedom and the War in Afghanistan, the 3rd Battalion, Princess Patricia's Canadian Light Infantry, deployed to Afghanistan. The battle group also included a reconnaissance squadron from Lord Strathcona's Horse and support elements from the 1 Service Battalion. These were the first major troops Canada sent in the theatre of operations, only preceded by a small team of Joint Task Force 2 operators in late 2001.

In March 2002, during Operation Anaconda, members of the 3PPCLI were in the Afghan province of Paktiya, clearing the mountains looking for Taliban and members of Al-Qaeda. The Canadian element of the operation, led by the United States, was composed of sixteen soldiers including six snipers. This sniper team, led by Master-Corporal Graham Ragsdale, registered more than 20 kills while Master-Corporal Arron Perry set the new world record for farthest combat kill with a .50 calibre McMillan Tac-50 sniper rifle that killed a Taliban fighter at a distance of 2,310 metres (1.44 mi). Later on in the mission, Corporal Rob Furlong set yet a new record by firing a shot from a McMillan Tac-50 that killed a Taliban fighter at a distance of 2,430 metres (1.51 mi). Both shots surpassed the long-standing previous world record of 2,250 metres (1.40 mi) set by U.S. Marine Gunnery Sergeant Carlos Hathcock during the Vietnam War. The U.S. Army awarded the team members the Bronze Star for their actions in combat. Other Canadian snipers recorded high hit ratios and some extremely difficult shots, but remain anonymous.

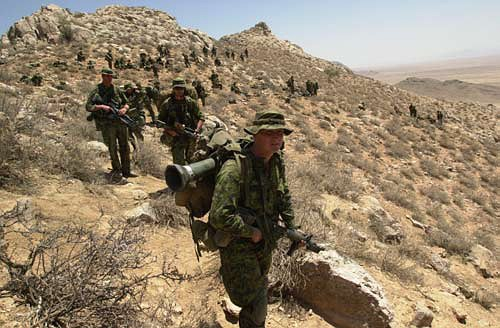
Soldiers from 3PPCLI in Afghanistan in 2002

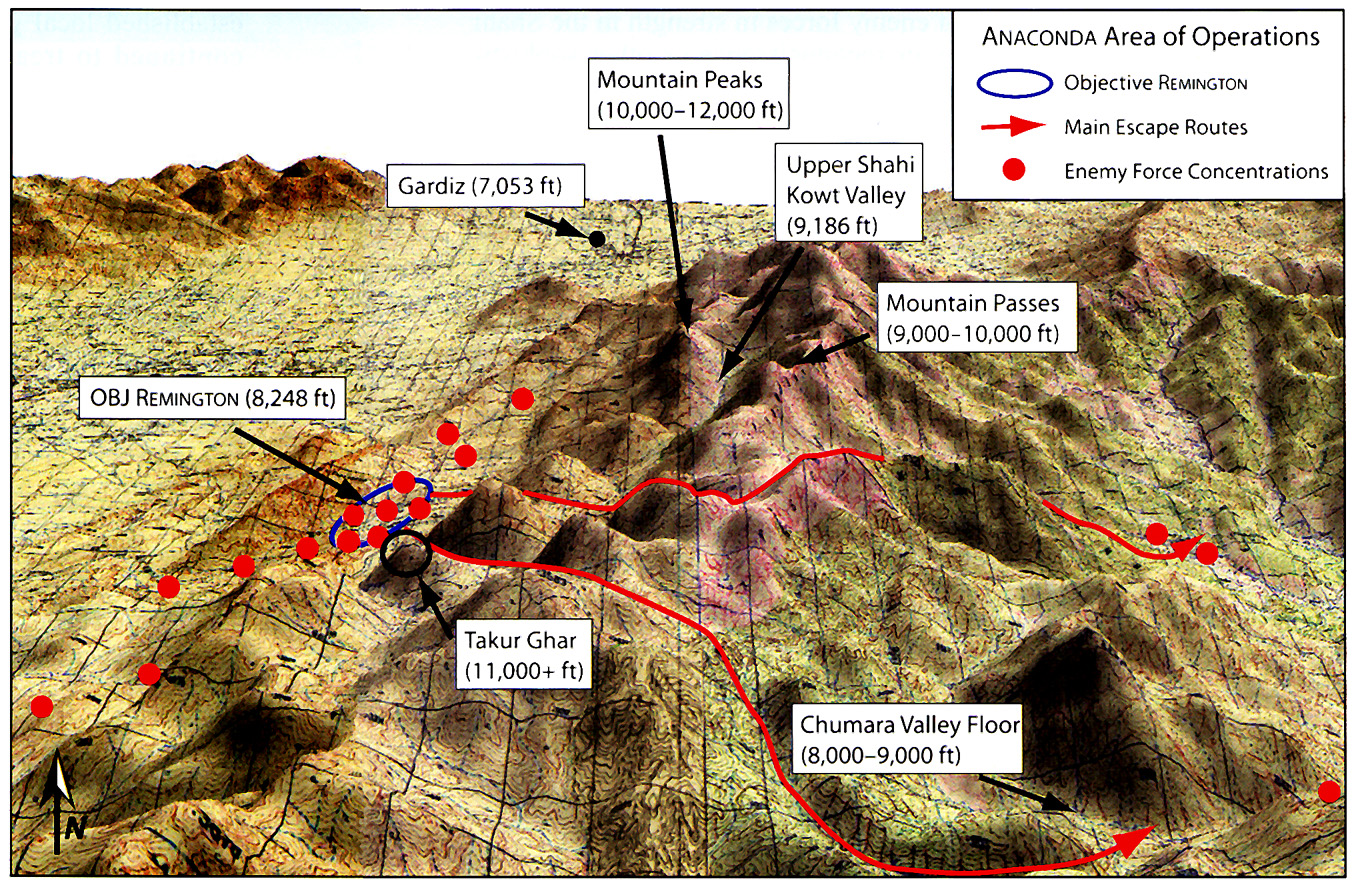
Map of Anaconda operations

On March 13, 2002, Operation Harpoon was launched in parallel of Operation Anaconda, with the goal of eliminating a small pocket of Taliban fighters. The operation involved air elements as well as a ground battlegroup composed of Canadian and American soldiers, led by Lieutenant-Colonel Pat Stogran, commander 3PPCLI battlegroup. The next day, a reconnaissance platoon from 3PPCLI led the American troops to a network of caves and bunkers used by Al-Qaeda resisters. The battlegroup proceeded to destroy the bunkers and Operation Harpoon ended on March 19.

After Operation Harpoon, the 3PPCLI returned to Kandahar International Airport, and started training for future operations. On April 18, 2002, the 3rd Battalion was involved in a highly publicized case of friendly-fire (blue on blue). The Canadian soldiers were participating in planned nighttime training exercises near Kandahar when Major Harry Schmidt, an American pilot from the Illinois Air National Guard, flew overhead. Believing he was being fired upon by enemy soldiers, Schmidt dropped one 500-pound (230 kg) laser-guided bomb on the soldiers from his F-16. Sergeant Marc Léger, Corporal Ainsworth Dyer, Private Richard Green and Private Nathan Smith were killed instantly and eight were injured. Schmidt was court-martialed by the U.S. and convicted of dereliction of duty as a result, in what became known as the Tarnak Farm incident.

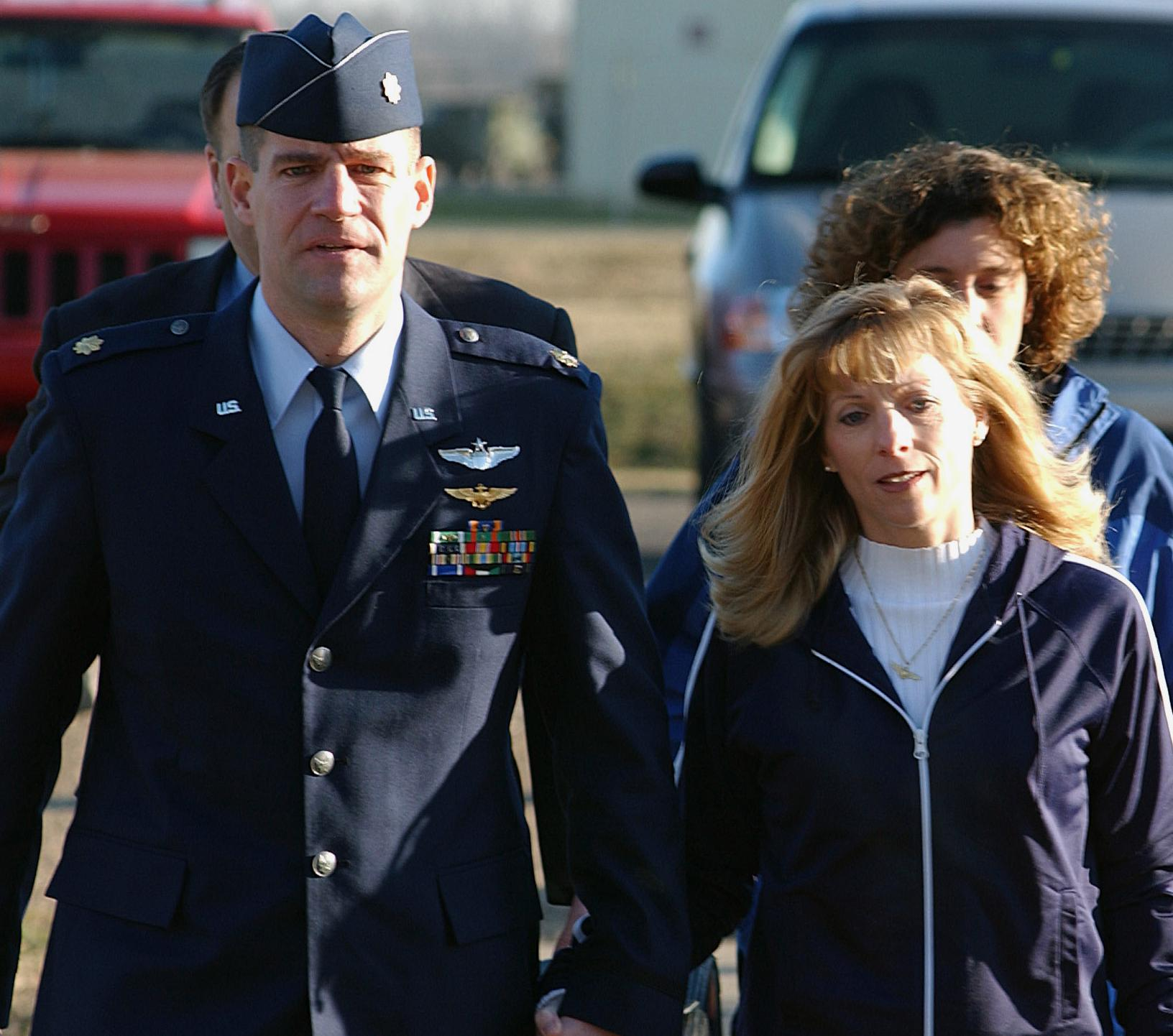
U.S. Air National Guard Major Harry Schmidt before a hearing

On May 4, 2002, Operation Torii was launched, and Lieutenant-Colonel Stogran led an international task force, which included 400 Canadian soldiers. The goal of the mission was to discover networks of caves used by the Talibans and Al-Qaeda, as well as to gather intelligence in the Tora Bora region.

From June 30 to July 4, 2002, the majority of 3PPCLI relocated to Zabul Province, Northwest of Kandahar, to establish for the first time a coalition presence in the region.

The 3rd Battalion started preparing its redeployment back to Canada on July 13, and its members came back home in two contingents, on July 28 and July 30, after a short stay in Guam. In March 2003, the 1st Battalion, Princess Patricia's Canadian Light Infantry, deployed a 35-soldier platoon to serve alongside already deployed units from Operation Apollo. The platoon was replaced in July by a Royal Canadian Horse Artillery platoon.

==== Operation Athena (2004–2010) ====
From August 2004 to February 2005, during Operation Athena, the 3rd Battalion deployed a reconnaissance platoon with the LdSH (RC) reconnaissance squadron to Kabul. A battlegroup built on 1PPCLI deployed in Kandahar from February to July 2006.

When the 1PPCLI deployed to Afghanistan, the Taliban began a major offensive and the Canadians were caught in the middle. After a spring in which a record number of attacks against Canadian soldiers had been set, and numerous offensives by Canadians which included six deaths to the Canadian Forces, the Taliban in Kandahar and Helmand provinces were massing and Operation Mountain Thrust was launched in the beginning of the summer. Canadians were the leading combatants and the first fighting in the Battle of Panjwaii took place. Complex mud-walled compounds made the rural Panjwaii district take on an urban style of fighting in some places. Daily firefights, artillery bombardments, and allied airstrikes turned the tides of the battle in favour of the Canadians.

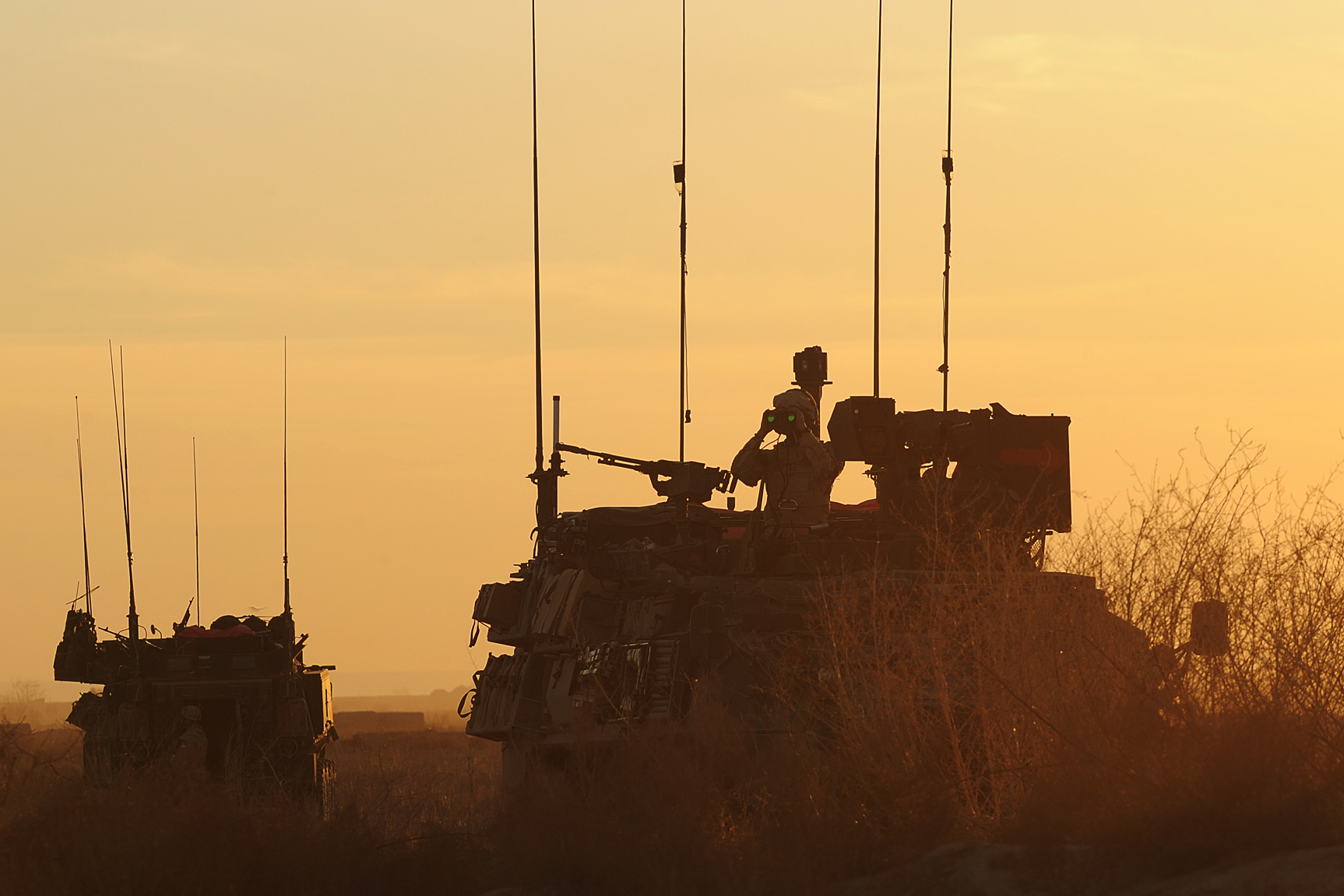
LAV-III patrol in Afghanistan (1PPCLI)

After Operation Mountain Thrust came to an end, Taliban fighters flooded back into the Panjwaii district in numbers that had not been seen yet in a single area in the post Anaconda war. The Canadian Forces, which came under NATO command at the end of July, launched Operation Medusa in an attempt to clear the areas of Taliban fighters once and for all.

The fighting of Operation Medusa was conducted with a larger force of Canadians, most of them being brand new to combat and largely fought by the rotation replacing the 1PPCLI, a battle group built around the 1st Battalion, Royal Canadian Regiment (RCR).

For their actions in 2006, the 1st Battalion PPCLI Battle Group was given the Commander-in-Chief Unit Commendation from the Governor-General of Canada.

The 2nd Battalion, PPCLI, took over from the 3rd Battalion, Royal 22^{e} Régiment (R22eR) in February 2008. In August of the same year, it is replaced by the 3RCR, and in September 2009, 1PPCLI returns in Afghanistan to replace 2R22eR, where it stayed until May 2010.

== Affiliate regiments ==
- United Kingdom – The Rifles
- Australia – The Royal Australian Regiment

== Battle Honours ==
Battle honours are the right given by the Canadian Crown to the regiment to mark on its colours the name of the battles or operations in which they stood out. Princess Patricia's Canadian Light Infantry has received 41 battle honours. Battle honours in all caps were awarded for participation in large operations and campaigns, while those in lowercase indicate honours granted for more specific battles. Those battle honours in bold type are authorized for emblazonment on the regimental colours. Two soldiers of the regiment have been awarded the Victoria Cross, the highest honours of the Commonwealth forces, during World War I.

Battle honours:

First World War
- **YPRES, 1915, '17**
- **Frezenberg**
- Bellewaarde
- **MOUNT SORREL**
- SOMME, 1916
- **Flers-Courcelette**
- Ancre Heights
- ARRAS, 1917, '18
- **Vimy, 1917**
- Arleux
- HILL 70
- **Passchendaele**
- **AMIENS**
- **Scarpe, 1918**
- HINDENBURG LINE
- Canal du Nord
- **PURSUIT TO MONS**
- **FRANCE AND FLANDERS, 1914-18**
- SIBERIA, 1918-1919
Second World War
- **LANDING IN SICILY**
- **Leonforte**
- Agira
- SICILY, 1943
- **The Moro**
- **The Gully**
- LIRI VALLEY
- **Hitler Line**
- **GOTHIC LINE**
- **RIMINI LINE**
- **San Fortunato**
- Savio Bridgehead
- Naviglio Canal
- **Fosso Munio**
- Granarolo
- ITALY, 1943–1945
- Apeldoorn
- **NORTH-WEST EUROPE, 1945**
Korean War
- **Kapyong**
- **KOREA, 1950–1953**
Southwest Asia
Afghanistan

== Victoria Cross recipients ==
Recipient	Location of action	Date of action
Sergeant George Mullin	Passchendaele, Belgium	30 October 1917
Sergeant Robert Spall (Note: Awarded posthumously)	Parvillers, France	12–13 August 1918

== Recognition ==
- Freedom of the city was exercised by the 3rd Battalion in Victoria, British Columbia on June 15, 1974.
- The regiment was granted the Freedom of the City of Edmonton, an honour in respect of the centennial of the regiment. This permits the regiment to conduct parades on city streets as of May 22, 2014.

=== Bands ===
External videos
- 1991 Sunset Ceremony Stick Drill 3rd Battalion PPCLI, Victoria, BC

Instead of a regimental band, PPCLI maintains three drum lines that form the regimental corps of drums, which provides ceremonial musical support. It is the Canadian counterpart to the Corps of Drums of the British Army Royal Logistics Corps, and thus it is an all-percussion unit that occasionally marches with the Royal Canadian Artillery Band. From 1919 to 1994 however, PPCLI did maintain a regimental band. PPCLI's band date back to the First World War when its core band came from the St. Mary's Boys Brigade Band and the 140th New Brunswick Battalion in January 1916. PPCLI Band was formed in 1919 under the guidance of Captain Tommy James and was stationed at Fort Osborne Barracks in Winnipeg. In early 1940s, the 1st Canadian Division Band was largely made up of former PPCLI bandsmen, which provided the basis to be reactivated after the war at Wainwright, Alberta. Due to military budget cuts in 1994, the entire band was disbanded and reduced to a corps of drums. The drum line was inactive due to the Afghanistan War in the early 2000s; however, it was re-formed under the leadership of Sergeant Keith Mooney and Warrant Officer Dave Kennedy in 2014. The process for establishment began in 2012 with the research for drum patterns and sequences. The drum line took part in the regimental Centennial Parade in September 2014.

The Edmonton Police Service pipe band, which was formed in 1914, was dissolved during the First World War, with its musicians being re-augmented to PPCLI and leading the regiment into battle. Members of the pipe band also served as stretcher bearers during the war. As a result of this close history together, the Pipes and Drums of the EPS, which was re-founded in 1961, is the only non-military civilian band within the Commonwealth to wear the badges of three Canadian regiments, with one of these being PPCLI. While serving as a public relations tool for the EPS, it performs alongside the regiment during public events in Edmonton. The band was invited to play at PPCLI's beating retreat ceremony in 1964 and at the regimental trooping the colour in 1967.

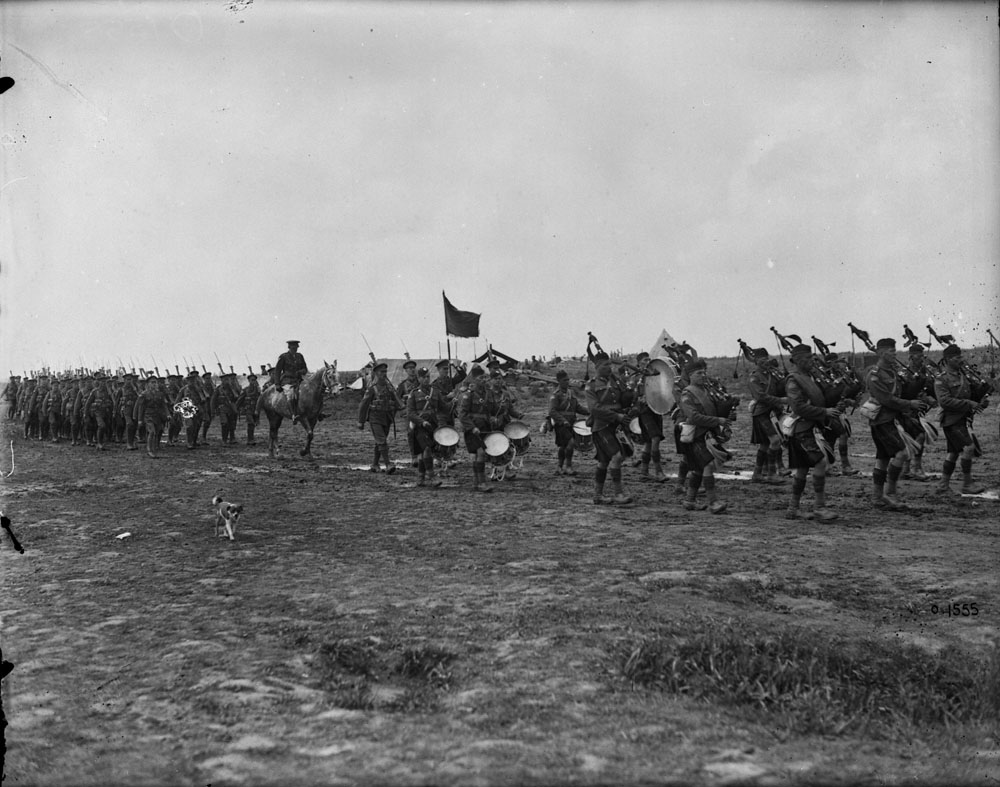
PPCLI parading with the pipes and drums at its head, July 1917.

== Traditions ==
Since March 17, 2007, the regiment's colonel-in-chief is former Governor-General of Canada Adrienne Clarkson. The previous colonel-in-chief was Countess Mountbatten of Burma, herself succeeding Princess Patricia. This is the first time that a person who is not a member of the Canadian Royal Family has been invited to take such a position with the regiment. The new colonel-in-chief took up her appointment at a ceremony on March 17, 2007, at the Regimental Headquarters in Edmonton.

The PPCLI does not have an official motto; however, their unofficial motto, "First In The Field", is based on the fact that they were the first Canadian unit to deploy in the Great War. The regiment also uses another non-official motto, Once a Patricia, Always a Patricia, which reminds that the regimental family includes retired soldiers and officers and those who transferred elsewhere in the Canadian Forces. March 17 is the most important date within the regiment, as it corresponds to Princess Patricia's birthday. May 8 is the anniversary of the 1915 Battle of Frezenberg and is observed by a parade and a church ceremony. April 25 is the anniversary of the Battle of Kapyong, normally observed by the 2nd Battalion with a parade. On August 10, the regiment celebrates the foundation of the PPCLI in 1914. September 21 is the anniversary of the Battle of San Fortunato in 1944.

The regimental march of Princess Patricia's Canadian Light Infantry consists of the songs "Has Anyone Seen The Colonel?", "It's a Long Way To Tipperary", and "Mademoiselle from Armentières".

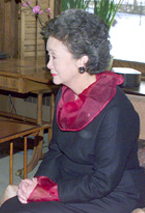
Adrienne Clarkson, Colonel-in-Chief of Princess Patricia's Canadian Light Infantry

== Colonels in Chief ==
- Princess Patricia of Connaught CI GCStJ VA CD 22 February 1918 – 12 January 1974
- The Countess Mountbatten of Burma CBE DStJ MSC CD 15 June 1974 – 17 March 2007
- The Rt Hon Adrienne Clarkson PC CC CMM COM DStJ CD 17 March 2007 – Present

== List of colonels of the regiment ==
- Brigadier Andrew Hamilton Gault, OBE, DSO, ED, CD (September 25, 1958 – November 28, 1958)
- Major-General Cameron B. Ware, DSO, CD (September 13, 1959 – April 21, 1977)
- Major-General George Grenville Brown, CD (April 21, 1977 – July 6, 1983)
- Colonel William Benjamin Scott Sutherland, CD (July 6, 1983 – October 14, 1987)
- Brigadier-General R. Stuart Graham, CD (October 15, 1987 – October 19, 1990)
- Major-General Herbert C. Pitts, MC, CD (October 19, 1990 – July 3, 1994)
- Major-General C. William Hewson, CMM, CD (July 3, 1994 – June 24, 2000)
- General A.J.G.D. de Chastelain, CC, CMM, CD, CH (June 24, 2000 – June 20, 2003)
- Major-General Robert I. Stewart, CMM, CD (June 20, 2003 – August 30, 2006)
- Brigadier-General J.E.L. Gollner, OMM, CD, (August 30, 2006 - May 17, 2010)
- Lieutenant-General Ray R. Crabbe, CMM, MSC, CD (May 17, 2010 – June 11, 2015)
- Major-General W. Brian Vernon, CD (June 11, 2015 – June 15, 2018)
- Brigadier-General V.W. Kennedy, OMM, MSM, CD (June 15, 2018 – Present)

== The Patrician ==
The Patrician is a regimental journal first published in May 1933. In 1946, a monthly paper started publishing, but was suspended during the Korean War. In 1953, The Patrician started publishing twice annually until 1960 when it became annual because of financial restraints. The Patrician adopted its present format in 2003.

== Ric-A-Dam-Doo ==
Ric-A-Dam-Doo is a nickname for the original camp flag of the PPCLI. Various sources claim that "Ric-A-Dam-Doo" is presumably an anglicization of the Scottish Gaelic for "cloth of thy mother"; but it is not clear that this claim has been confirmed by a Gaelic speaker. The independent companies that preceded the formation of the 42nd Regiment of Foot were known in Scottish Gaelic as Am Freiceadan Dubh, which translates to "The Black Watch" in English.

In 1984, in a conversation with the PPCLI Colonel-of-The-Regiment, Colonel William Sutherland, Lieutenant James MacInnis surmised that the PPCLI's founder, Brigadier Hamilton Gault, a former Black Watch officer from the Canadian Militia, may have used the Gaelic term when referring to the flag and Lieutenant MacInnis believed that subsequent soldiers' bastardization of the Gaelic phrase Rìgh-ùr na Duibh became accepted practice. MacInnis's knowledge came from his own family history. An ancestor, Donald Livingston, son of Anna MacInnis rescued the Rìgh-ùr na Duibh of the Appin Regiment after their defeat at the Battle of Culloden in 1746. Today, the Appin Regiment Colour is displayed in the National Museum of Scotland in Edinburgh. The Ric-A-Dam-Doo was hand-sewn by Princess Patricia and presented to the regiment.

The Ric-A-Dam-Doo

The Princess Pat's Battalion
They sailed across the Herring Pond,
They sailed across the Channel too,
And landed there with the Ric-A-Dam-Doo
Dam-Doo, Dam-Doo.

The Bombers of the Princess Pat's
Are scared of naught, excepting rats,
They're full of pep and dynamite too,
They'd never lose the Ric-A-Dam-Doo,
Dam-Doo, Dam-Doo.

Old Hammy Gault, our first PP,
He led this band across the sea,
He'd lose an arm, or leg or two
Before he'd lose the Ric-A-Dam-Doo,
Dam-Doo, Dam-Doo.

And then we came to Sicily.
We leapt ashore with vim and glee.
The Colonel said the Wops are through
Let's chase the Hun with the Ric-A-Dam-Doo,
Dam-Doo, Dam-Doo.

The Ric-A-Dam-Doo, pray what is that?
'Twas made at home by Princess Pat,
It's Red and Gold and Royal Blue,
That's what we call the Ric-A-Dam-Doo,
Dam-Doo, Dam-Doo.

In 2011, Colonel-in-Chief Adrienne Clarkson asked Bryan Adams to write a song to commemorate the 100th anniversary of the PPCLI. Together with his songwriting partner Jim Vallance, they composed the song "Ric-A-Dam-Doo". It was recorded by the wives of the regiment in Edmonton, Alberta, and was released to the public by Universal Records.

"Ric-A-Dam-Doo" (written by Adams / Vallance)

in a foreign field
in a distant land
when our country calls we will be there

hear the battle cry
see the Ric A Dam Doo
it's the flag of freedom in the air

we were glorious, victorious
standing shoulder to shoulder to the end
while the world is turning
keep the home fires burning
until we meet again

o'er stormy seas
however far away
never fear nor fail it's the cross we bear

under crimson and blue
it's the Ric A Dam Doo
singing songs of freedom everywhere

we were glorious, victorious
standing shoulder to shoulder to the end
while the world is turning
keep the home fires burning
until we meet again

under crimson and blue - it's the Ric A Dam Doo

== Western Hockey League affiliation ==
The PPCLI is not directly affiliated with the Western Hockey League, but they are associated through name with the Regina Pats who were formed in 1917 in Regina, Saskatchewan, as a major junior hockey team. The "Patricias" shortened their name to the Regina "Pats" in 1923, and to this day wear the PPCLI patch on their hockey jersey's shoulders. The Regina Pats are the longest lived major junior hockey team in the world.

== In popular culture ==
In the movie "Across the Pacific" (1942), a cashiered U.S. Army officer, played by Humphrey Bogart crosses the border in 1941 and attempts to enlist in the Princess Pats. He is refused, as the regiment expects all its officers to have high moral standards. The character later comments that his rejection "was a *little* on the insulting side".

The famed campfire song, Princess Pat, is said to be a variant of the infantry's marching song.

A soldier of the regiment is interviewed in Max Brooks's zombie novel World War Z.

The character Major Patrick Gordon/Patrick Crawley in Season 2 of Downton Abbey was a member of PPCLI.

The Canadian infantry soldiers in the Afghanistan War-based movie Hyena Road are members of the PPCLI.

In 1968 movie "The Devil's Brigade", Sgt. Patrick O'Neill (played by Jeremy Slate) is wearing P.P.C.L.I. insignia on his shoulder.

In the "Ultimate Soldier Challenge" TV show on History Channel (Season 1, Episode 5), three teams of two soldiers (US Marines, Canadians, and Contractors) are competing in various military tasks. The Canadians (Alex and Andrija) are from the PPCLI.

== Freedoms ==
The regiment has received the Freedom of several locations throughout its history; these include:

- 1952: Calgary
- (British Columbia) 16 September 1972: Esquimalt.
- (British Columbia) 15 June 1974: Victoria.
- 1985: Ypres
- (Ontario) 1985: Ottawa.
- (Manitoba) 1989: Winnipeg.
- 2011: Kapyong
- (Manitoba) 22 May 2012: Brandon.
- (Alberta) 10 August 2014: Edmonton.
- (Alberta) 15 September 2014: Gibbons.

== Badge ==
Coat of arms of Princess Patricia's Canadian Light Infantry
Notes The announcement of the Letters Patent was made on November 22, 2008, in Volume 142, page 2987 of the Canada Gazette. Adopted 2008 Badge Argent the coronet of Her Royal Highness Princess Patricia enfiled by her cypher Or all within an annulus Gules edged and inscribed PRINCESS PATRICIA'S CANADIAN LIGHT INFANTRY in letters Or the whole ensigned by the Royal Crown proper. Symbolism The crown represents service to the Sovereign. The cypher and coronet are those of H.R.H. Princess Patricia, the granddaughter of Queen Victoria, who granted the regiment the right to bear her name. “PRINCESS PATRICIA'S CANADIAN LIGHT INFANTRY” is the regimental title.

== Order of precedence ==
Preceded by The Royal Canadian Regiment	Princess Patricia's Canadian Light Infantry	Succeeded by Royal 22^{e} Régiment

== Possible specialist Arctic sovereignty role ==
It has been suggested in a Canadian professional military journal that the regiment's third battalion (3 PPCLI) could be adapted to become a specialized light infantry battalion that is able to deploy parachute infantry and marine infantry company groups to support the protection of Canada's sovereignty in the Arctic.

== See also ==
- Princess Pat

== Bibliography ==
- Lilwall, Scott (2020). "A Battalion ApartTales of Princess Patricia's Canadian Light Infantry and the Ric-A-Dam-Doo". CBC News.
- Hodder-Williams, Ralph (1923). Princess Patricia's Canadian Light Infantry 1914–1919, Volume 1. Hodder and Stoughton Limited.
- Hodder-Williams, Ralph (1923). Princess Patricia's Canadian Light Infantry 1914–1919, Volume 2. Hodder and Stoughton Limited. ISBN 9781843425625.
- Hodder-Williams, Ralph (1968). Princess Patricia's Canadian Light Infantry 1914–1919, Second Edition (Volumes 1 and 2 [Omitting Appendix 5]) in one volume. The Carswell Printing Company.
- Stevens, G.R. (1923). Princess Patricia's Canadian Light Infantry 1914–1919, Volume Three. Southarm Printing Company.
- Williams, Jeffery (1985). Princess Patricia's Canadian Light Infantry. L. Cooper in association with Secker & Warburg. ISBN 9780436571114.
- Frost, Charles Sydney (1988). Once A Patricia (Memoirs of a Junior Infantry Officer in World War II). Vanwell Publishing. ISBN 9780920277195. "Once A Patricia (Memoirs of a Junior Infantry Officer in World War II)."
- Parrot, Donald Fleming (1990). Princess Patricia's Regiment, 1938–1941. D.F. Parrott. ISBN 9780969441007.
- Mitchell, Michael (1992). Ducimus, The Regiments of the Canadian Infantry. Canadian Infantry Heritage Foundation. ISBN 9780969642107.
- Peacock, Robert S. (1994). Kim-Chi, Asahi and Rum (A Platoon Commander Remembers Korea). Lugus Publishing. ISBN 9780921633679.
- Williams, Jeffery (1995). First in the Field, Gault of the Patricia's. Leo Cooper. ISBN 9780850524369.
- Newman, Stephen Keith (2000). With the Patricia's in Flanders, 1914–1918: then & now. Bellawaerde House Publishing. ISBN 9780968769607.
- Bercuson, David Jay (2001). The Patricias: The Proud History of a Fighting Regiment. Stoddart Publishing. ISBN 9780773732988. "The Patricias: The Proud History of a Fighting Regiment."
- Zubrowski, Robert F. (2003). As Long as Faith and Freedom Last: Stories from Princess Patricia's Canadian Light Infantry from June 1914 to September 1919. Bunker to Bunker Publishing. ISBN 9781894255264.
- Gray, Hub; Litwin, Grania (2003). Beyond The Danger Close: The Korea Experience Revealed, 2nd Battalion Princess Patricia's Canadian Light Infantry. Bunker to Bunker Publishing. ISBN 9781894255240.
- Frost, Charles Sydney (2004). Always A Patricia (A Veteran Remembers). Borealis Press. ISBN 9780888871992.
- Bercuson, David J. (2013). The Patricias: A Century of Service. Goose Lane Editions. ISBN 9780864926753.
