= Robert Spall =

Robert Spall VC
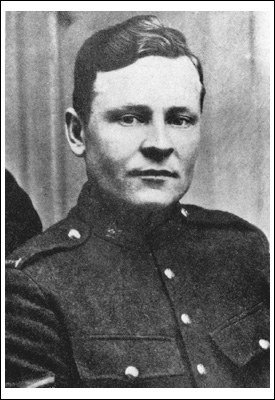
- Born: 5 March 1890; Acton, London, England
- Died: 13 August 1918 (aged 28); Parvillers-le-Quesnoy, France
- Military career
- Allegiance: Canada
- Branch: Canadian Expeditionary Force
- Service years: 1915 - 1918
- Rank: Sergeant
- Units: Princess Patricia's Canadian Light Infantry
- Conflicts: First World War †
- Awards: Victoria Cross

Robert Spall VC (5 March 1890 – 13 August 1918), was a Canadian recipient of the Victoria Cross, the highest and most prestigious award for gallantry in the face of the enemy that can be awarded to British and Commonwealth forces.

Robert Spall was born in Acton, London, England on March 5, 1890. He enlisted in the Canadian Expeditionary Force in July 1915.

Spall was 28 years old, and a sergeant in Princess Patricia's Canadian Light Infantry, Canadian Expeditionary Force during the First World War, and was awarded the VC for his actions on 13 August 1918 near Parvillers-le-Quesnoy, France.

His citation reads:

For most conspicuous bravery and self-sacrifice when, during an enemy counter-attack, his platoon was isolated. Thereupon Serjt. Spall took a Lewis gun and, standing on the parapet, fired upon the advancing enemy, inflicting very severe casualties. He then came down the trench directing the men into a sap seventy-five yards from the enemy. Picking up another Lewis gun, this gallant N.C.O. again climbed the parapet, and by his fire held up the enemy. It was while holding up the enemy at this point that he was killed. Serjt. Spall deliberately gave his life in order to extricate his platoon from a most difficult situation, and it was owing to his bravery that the platoon was saved.

— The London Gazette, 26 October 1918

Sergeant Spall's final resting place was lost and as such he is commemorated on the Canadian National Vimy Memorial with the over 11,000 other Canadian dead of the war killed in France but whose remains were lost or never recovered.

His Victoria Cross is displayed at the PPCLI Museum at The Military Museums in Calgary, Alberta, Canada.

He is also commemorated in Acton, London, England with a plaque outside the house he was born at 16 Spencer Road.

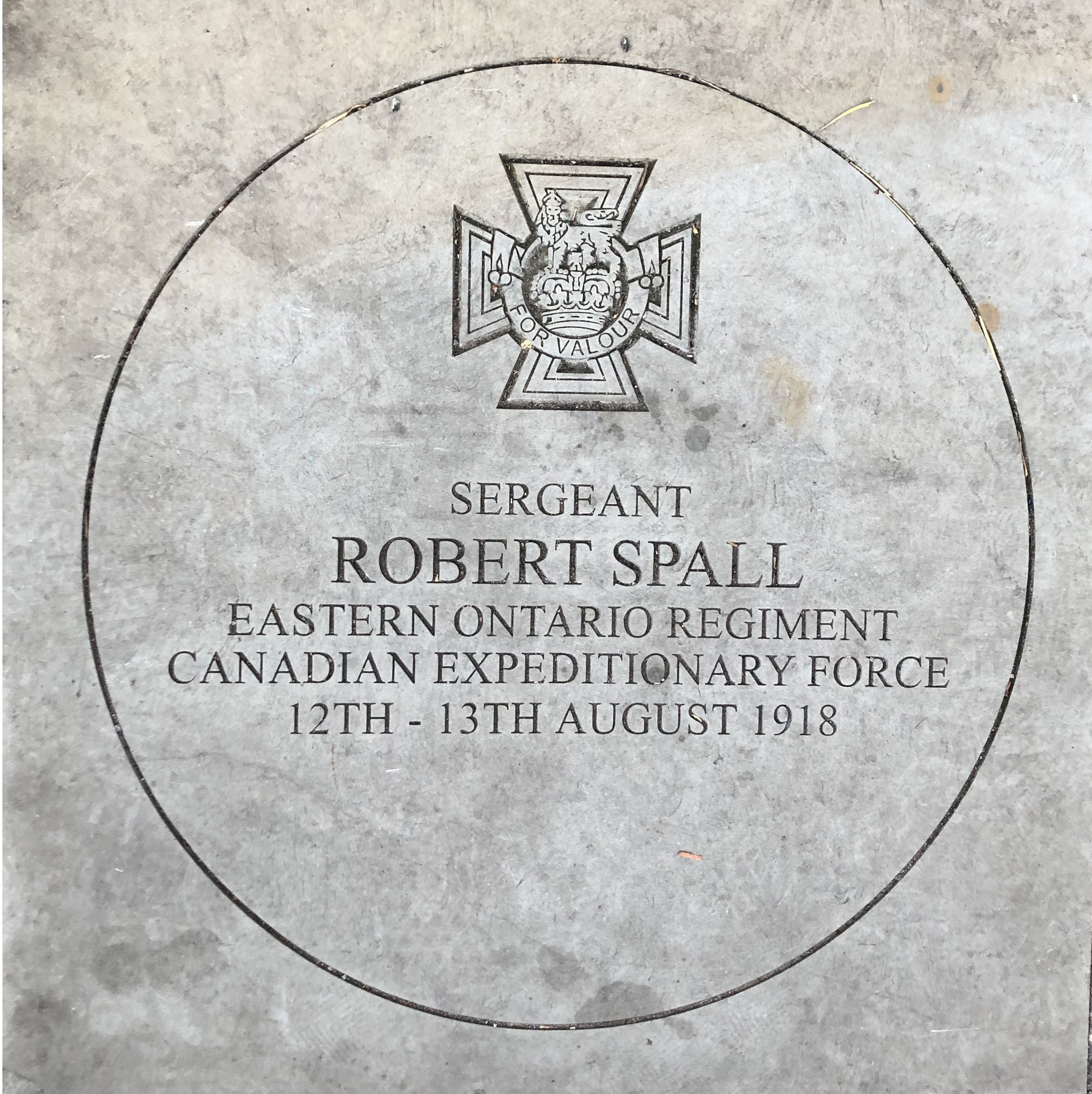
Robert Spall's birthplace plaque in Acton
