= James Mess =

Canadian brigadier (1890–1962)

Brigadier James Mess (1890 – 13 December 1962) was a Canadian industrialist and Army officer, who served as the Deputy Adjutant-General and Director of Recruiting during the Second World War.

Mess served in France during the First World War as part of the 4th Canadian Machine Gun Battery, before taking over the command of the 10th Canadian Machine Gun Battery. He was subsequently wounded and was second-in-command of a machine gun depot in England. After the war he became the commander of the Canadian Machine Gun Corps.

On the outbreak of the Second World War he was appointed Director of Recruiting in a civilian capacity, and Deputy Adjutant-General with the rank of brigadier. He resigned on 29 November 1944 in protest against the King government's policy of limited conscription, which he viewed as "inadequate" and "not good enough".
