= Hugh McKenzie (VC) =

Recipient of the Victoria Cross

Lieutenant Hugh McKenzie VC DCM
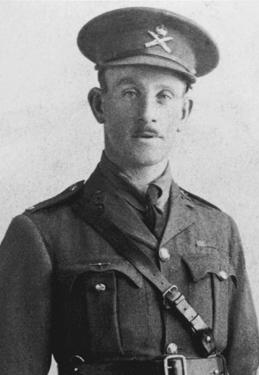
- Hugh McKenzie during the First World War
- Born: Hugh McDonald McKenzie; 5 December 1885; Liverpool, United Kingdom
- Died: 30 October 1917 (aged 31); Passchendaele salient, Belgium
- Burial place: No known grave, memorialised on the Menin Gate
- Spouse: Marjorie McKenzie
- Military career
- Allegiance: Dominion of Canada
- Branch: Canadian Militia: Canadian Expeditionary Force
- Service years: 1914–17
- Rank: Lieutenant
- Units: Princess Patricia’s Canadian Light Infantry; Canadian Machine Gun Corps: 7th Brigade Machine Gun Company
- Conflicts: First World War: Battle of Passchendaele; Second Battle of Passchendaele †
- Awards: Victoria Cross; Distinguished Conduct Medal; Croix de Guerre
- Other work: Teamster

Hugh McDonald McKenzie VC DCM (5 December 1885 – 30 October 1917) was a Canadian soldier who served during World War I. McKenzie was a recipient of the Victoria Cross, the highest and most prestigious award for gallantry in the face of the enemy that can be awarded to British and Commonwealth forces. McKenzie received the award posthumously for his actions during an attack that took place during the Second Battle of Passchendaele in October 1917.

== Early life ==
McKenzie was born in Liverpool, in the United Kingdom, on 5 December 1885. Shortly after his birth the family moved to Inverness, in Scotland. After his father died, the family moved to Dundee and McKenzie later found work with the Caledonian Railway Company. He emigrated to Canada in 1911, living with his wife, Marjorie, in North Bay, Ontario.

== Military service ==
In August 1914, shortly after the outbreak of the First World War, McKenzie volunteered for the Canadian Expeditionary Force and enlisted in Princess Patricia's Canadian Light Infantry. On enlistment, his attestation papers state that he had been previously employed as a teamster and had previous military experience. Serving initially as a private, McKenzie was promoted steadily through the ranks, reaching sergeant in September 1916 and becoming a company sergeant-major in early 1917. As a corporal, in early 1916, he had received the Distinguished Conduct Medal for actions while in command of a machine-gun section. In January 1917, he was commissioned as a second lieutenant and was transferred to the Canadian Machine Gun Corps, attached to the 7th Brigade Machine Gun Company.

He was 31 years old, and a lieutenant when the following deed took place for which he was awarded the VC:

On 30 October 1917 at the Meetscheele Spur, near Passchendaele, Belgium, Lieutenant McKenzie was "in charge of a section of four machine guns accompanying the infantry in an attack. Seeing that all the officers and most of the NCOs of an infantry company had become casualties and that the men were hesitating before a nest of enemy machine-guns, he handed over his command to an NCO, rallied the infantry, organised an attack and captured the strong-point". As machine-gun fire from a pill-box nearby inflicted further casualties on the advancing Canadians, McKenzie conducted a brief reconnaissance of the position and after placing down troops in fire support positions, he led a frontal attack on the position. The pill-box was subsequently captured but McKenzie was killed in the effort.

Hugh McKenzie also received the French Croix de Guerre for his actions. He has no known grave and is commemorated on the Menin Gate war memorial in Ypres, Belgium.

When the award of his Victoria Cross was announced in the London Gazette on 12 February 1918, his surname was misspelled as "Mackenzie." He is also commemorated by a plaque at the Rosebank Primary School, in Dundee, Scotland, which he attended as a child.

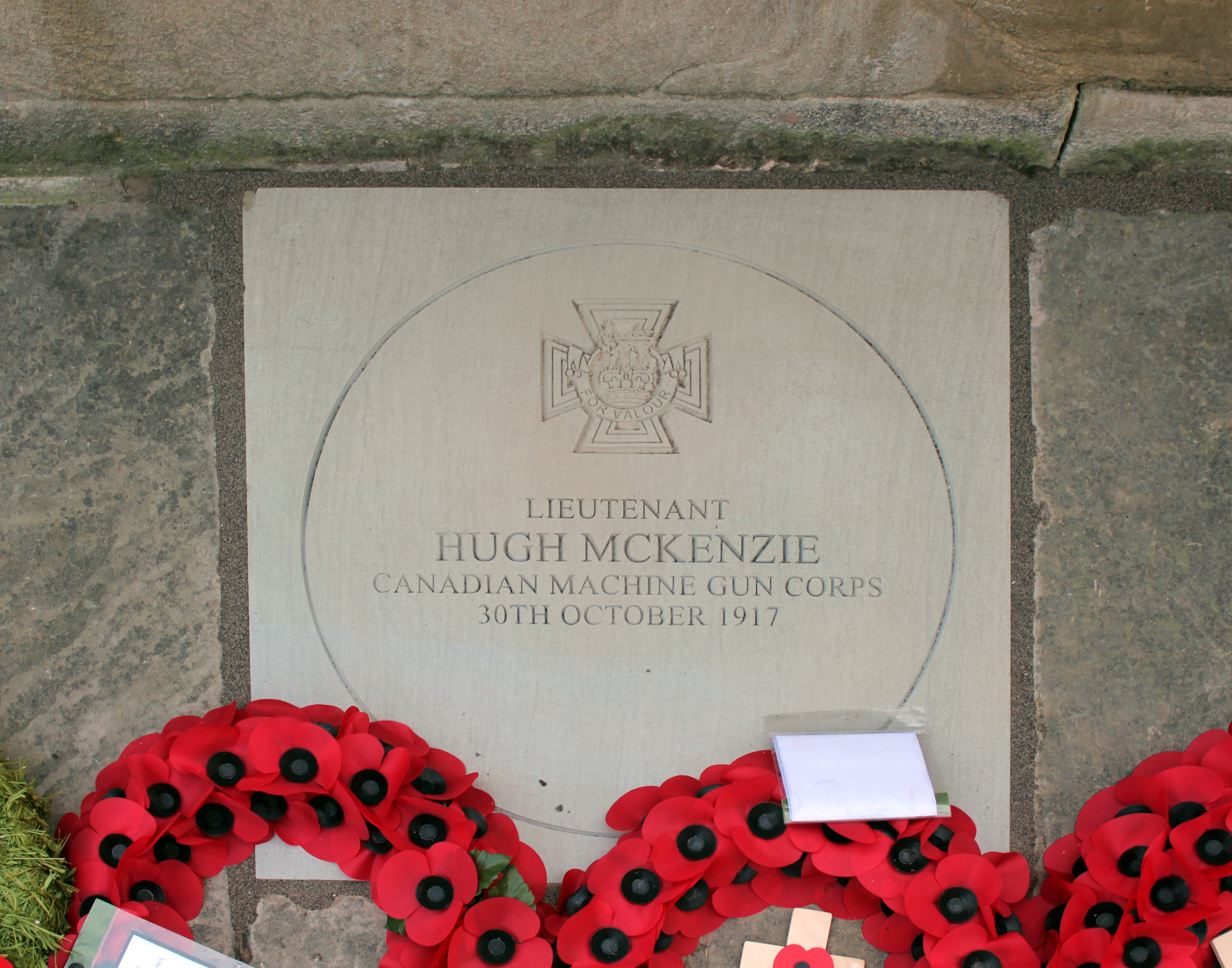
Centenary memorial at Our Lady and St Nicholas church, Liverpool, unveiled 30 October 2017

== The medal ==
His Victoria Cross is displayed at the Museum of the Regiments in Calgary, Alberta, Canada.
