= George Mullin (VC) =

Major George Mullin VC MM
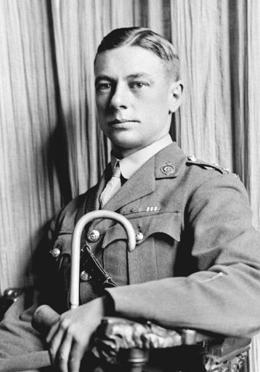
- Lieutenant George Mullin c.1918
- Born: 15 August 1891; Portland, Oregon, United States
- Died: 5 April 1963 (aged 71); Regina, Saskatchewan, Canada
- Burial place: South Side Cemetery, Moosomin, Saskatchewan
- Military career
- Allegiance: Canada
- Branch: Canadian Militia: Canadian Expeditionary Force; Canadian Army
- Service years: 1914-?
- Rank: Major
- Nickname: Harry
- Units: Princess Patricia's Canadian Light Infantry
- Commands: Sergeant at Arms, Saskatchewan Legislature; Captain, Veterans Guard
- Conflicts: World War I: Western Front; Battle of Passchendaele; Second Battle of Passchendaele; World War II
- Awards: Victoria Cross; Military Medal; Mentioned in Despatches

George Harry Mullin VC, MM (15 August 1891 – 5 April 1963) was an American-Canadian soldier in the Canadian army. Mullin was a recipient of the Victoria Cross, the highest award for gallantry in the face of the enemy that can be awarded to British and Commonwealth forces.

== Details ==
Mullin was born in Portland, Oregon, and his parents brought him to Moosomin in the North-West Territories' District of Assiniboia at the age of two. He enlisted in the Canadian Expeditionary Force in December 1914.

== Action ==
He was 26 years old, and a sergeant in Princess Patricia's Canadian Light Infantry, Canadian Expeditionary Force during the First World War when the following deed took place for which he was awarded the VC.

On 30 October 1917 at Passchendaele, Belgium, Sergeant Mullin single-handedly captured a pill-box which had withstood heavy bombardment and was causing heavy casualties and holding up the attack. He rushed the snipers' post in front, destroyed the garrison with bombs, shot two gunners and then compelled the remaining 10 men to surrender. All the time rapid fire was directed on him and his clothes were riddled with bullets, but he never faltered in his purpose and he not only helped to save the situation but indirectly saved many lives.

=== Citation ===
The citation reads:

No. 51339 Sjt. George Harry Mullin, M.M., Can. Inf.

For most conspicuous bravery in attack, when single-handed he captured a commanding "Pill-box" which had withstood the heavy bombardment and was causing heavy casualties to our forces and holding up the attack. He rushed a sniper's post in front, destroyed the garrison with bombs, and, crawling on to the top of the "Pill-box," he shot the two machine-gunners with his revolver. Sjt. Mullin then rushed to another entrance and compelled the garrison of ten to surrender.

His gallantry and fearlessness were witnessed by many, and, although rapid fire was directed upon him, and his clothes riddled by bullets, he never faltered in his purpose and he not only helped to save the situation, but also indirectly saved many lives.

— London Gazette, 11 January 1918

== Further Information ==
Mullin had earlier received the Military Medal and finished the war as a lieutenant. In 1934 he was appointed as Sergeant at Arms of the Saskatchewan legislature. Mullin served as a captain in the Veterans Guard during the Second World War. He was also a father of 4 and a loving husband.

Mullin is commemorated with the two-block long residential street 'Mullin Avenue' in the south central part of Regina, Saskatchewan.

Mullin is buried at Moosomin South Side Cemetery, Moosomin, Saskatchewan, Canada in the Legion Plot (approximately N 50.13409 W 101.68206 ).

His Victoria Cross is displayed at the Museum of the Regiments in Calgary, Alberta, Canada.
