= Arnold Safroni-Middleton =

British composer (1873–1950)

George Arnold Haynes Safroni-Middleton, also known as Count Safroni (3 September 1873 – 7 November 1950) was a British composer, director, violinist, harpist, writer and amateur astronomer. For several works he used the pseudonym William H. Myddleton.

== Biography ==
Safroni-Middleton was born in Kent. He studied violin with Pablo de Sarasate and afterwards started performing as violinist. He played the violin in the Orchestra of "Her Majesty's Theatre" in Sydney, the Orchestra of the Opera House in Auckland, the Providence Opera House in Providence (Rhode Island), the Tokyo Orchestra, the Government House (Sarawak) Orchestra and the Government House (Hayti) Mexico Orchestra. As solo performer he toured around Australia, South America, Italy and Spain.

Later he became bandmaster of the Orchestra of the Carl Rosa Opera Company in London.

As a writer he wrote many novels, travel guides and poems. He explored Borneo, Papua New Guinea and Malaysia.

As a composer he is mainly known for his marches and dance music for the harmony orchestra. His best known piece is probably Imperial Echoes (1913), which for many years was the theme of Radio Newsreel on BBC radio.

He died in Streatham and was buried at West Norwood Cemetery on 10 November 1950, age 77.

== Compositions ==
=== Works for orchestra ===
- Imperial Echoes (BBC Radio Newsreel march)
- The Leek - A Selection of Welsh Melodies published by Boosey and Hawkes early 20th c.
- The Rose - A Selection of English Melodies published by Boosey and Hawkes early 20th c.
- The Shamrock - A Selection of Irish Melodies published by Boosey and Hawkes early 20th c.
- The Thistle - A Selection of Scotch Melodies published by Boosey and Hawkes 1903.

=== Works for harmony orchestra ===
- American President, march
- Boys of The Old Brigade
- By Imperial Command, march
- By Order of the King, march
- Call of the Empire, march
- Chanson de la Nuit, entr'acte
- Down South
- Firenze, waltz
- House of Hanover, march
- Imperial Echoes, march
- Imperial March, march
- King's Cavalier, march
- Light of the Regiment
- Men of the Mist, march
- Negro dream
- Salute the Standard, march
- Samoan Love Waltz
- Sierra Leone, march
- The Dashing British, march
- The Last Tryst, concert waltz
- The Monk's Dream
- The Night Riders, march
- The Phantom Brigade, march
- The Relief, march
- The Shamrock
- The Scottish Thistle
- The Stronghold, march

=== Stage plays ===
- La Foresta, musical comedy
- Gabrielle, musical comedy

== Publications ==
- Bush Songs and Oversea Voices, including Songs of the South Sea Islands, Australia, Etc., London, John Long, 1914, 159 p.
- Sailor and Beachcomber: Confessions of a Life at Sea, in Australia and amid the Islands of the Pacific, Grant Richards, London, UK, 1915, 304 p.
- A Vagabond's Odyssey: Being Further Reminiscences of a Wandering Sailor-Troubadour in Many Lands, Dodd & Mead, 1916, 328 p.
- Wine Dark Seas and Tropic Skies: Reminiscences and a Romance of the South Seas, Grant Richards, London, UK, 1918
- Gabrielle of the Lagoon: A Romance of the South Seas, The Solomon Isles. J.B. Lippincott Co., Philadelphia/London, 1919, 286 p.
- South Sea Foam: The Romantic Adventures of a Modern Don Quixote in the Southern Seas, George H. Doran, 1920, 350 p.
- Sestrina: A Romance of the South Seas, George H. Doran, 1920, 256 p.
- No Extradition, Ward, Lock & Co., 1923
- Tropic Shadows: Memories of the South Seas, Together with Reminiscences of the Author's Sea Meetings with Joseph Conrad, London: The Richards Press, 1927, 302 p.
- Two Faces in Borneo: A Drama of a Dual Personality, London, The Richards Press, 1928
- Tides of Sunrise and Sunset: The Fourth Dimension of Romance, London: Heath Cranton, 1932. 219 p.
- In the Green Leaf: A Chapter of Autobiography, London: Fortune Press, 1950, 199 p.
- Australian Bush Lyrics

== Bibliography ==
- Wolfgang Suppan, Armin Suppan: Das Neue Lexikon des Blasmusikwesens, 4th edition, Freiburg-Tiengen, Blasmusikverlag Schulz GmbH, 1994, ISBN 3-923058-07-1
- Paul E. Bierley, William H. Rehrig: The heritage encyclopedia of band music : composers and their music, Westerville, Ohio: Integrity Press, 1991, ISBN 0-918048-08-7
- Norman E. Smith: March music notes, Lake Charles, La.: Program Note Press, 1986, ISBN 978-0-9617346-1-9
- John L. Adams: Musicians' autobiographies - An annotated bibliography of writings available in English, 1800 to 1980, Jefferson, North Carolina: McFarland, 1982, 126p.
- Leslie Gilbert Pine: Who's who in music, First post-war edition (1949–50), London: Shaw Publishing, 1950, 419 p.
- Sir Landon Ronald: Who's who in music, London: Shaw Publishing, 1937
