= Imperial Echoes =

Imperial Echoes (1913) is the title a piece for solo piano by Arnold Safroni that was later adapted as a military march and became well known through its frequent use on BBC radio during the Second World War and beyond.

== Original composition ==
Imperial Echoes was published by Boosey and Hawkes of London in 1913. Its composer, George Arnold Haynes Safroni-Middleton (1873–1950), used the name Arnold Safroni for professional purposes and also composed as W.H. Myddleton.

== His Master's Voice recording and Radio Newsreel ==
In 1928 the tune was adapted as a march by James Ord Hume (1864–1932) and recorded for His Master's Voice by the Band of the Royal Air Force, conducted by Squadron Leader R.P. O'Donnell, M.V.O. In 1940 the opening and closing parts of this recording were chosen to introduce and close the BBC's daily news programme Radio Newsreel (initially, Radio News Reel), which was broadcast on both the Home Service in Britain and the Overseas Service (later the World Service). As such it became one of a group of tunes, including Lillibullero and Eric Coates' Calling All Workers, that became inextricably associated with the BBC's output during the war. Radio Newsreel, with its theme, continued until 1970 in Britain and 1988 on the World Service.

In 1997 the BBC issued the 1928 recording on compact disc as part of a compilation of television and radio themes.

== Other versions ==
Imperial Echoes became a regular part of the repertoire of military bands and was adopted by the Royal Army Pay Corps as its regimental quick march. As such, the tune has been recorded by a number of bands. Other versions have included a jazz interpretation by Acker Bilk and a recording on the organ of the Blackpool Tower Ballroom by Reginald Dixon. It is currently the official marchpast in quick time for the 3rd Battalion, Princess Patricia's Canadian Light Infantry.
