= Radio Newsreel =

Former news programme produced by the British Broadcasting Corporation

- Other names: The News and Radio Newsreel
- Genre: News magazine
- Running time: 15 mins
- Country of origin: United Kingdom
- Language(s): English
- Home station: BBC General Forces Programme; BBC Light Programme; BBC Home Service; BBC Radio 4; BBC World Service
- Syndicates: Mutual Broadcasting System; Canadian Broadcasting Corporation; Public Radio International
- Created by: Norman Collins
- Original release: 1940 – 31 October 1988
- Opening theme: "Imperial Echoes" by Arnold Safroni

Radio Newsreel is a news programme produced by the British Broadcasting Corporation between 1940 and 1988. The 15-minute programme, which was eventually broadcast four times a day on the BBC World Service with a daily broadcast on the BBC Light Programme (as part of The News and Radio Newsreel), was composed of recorded dispatches from correspondents in the field, live and recorded actuality and such other features, borrowed from the format of the cinema newsreel, as interviews with people currently in the news.

An example of the programme's early content is the coverage of Captain George Robinson's "Adventure in a lifeboat adrift in the Atlantic", broadcast on 19 August 1942.

The programme was broadcast in the United Kingdom at 19:00 each evening; transmission to North America was scheduled for 03:30 GMT, (22:30 EST, 19:30 PST).

Radio Newsreel was created by Norman Collins, who had worked as the head of the BBC General Forces Programme and the BBC Light Programme. It was originally broadcast on the Overseas Service of the BBC, and also broadcast by the BBC General Forces Programme from 27 February 1944 until 28 July 1945. It returned to domestic airwaves on 3 November 1947, when it started to be broadcast by the BBC Light Programme, later transferring to the BBC Home Service and eventually BBC Radio 4. In 1953, the programme had a domestic audience of over 4 million listeners. On 3 April 1970, it was broadcast in the UK for the last time, but it continued to be broadcast on the BBC World Service for a further 18 years, with the final edition on 31 October 1988.

Outside the United Kingdom, the programme was also carried weekly on the Mutual Broadcasting System in the United States during World War II and as part of the Canadian Broadcasting Corporation's radio programming in the 1970s. Until 1987, American Public Radio also carried the programme in the United States.
