= Operation Harpoon (2002) =

- Part of the War in Afghanistan (2001–2021)
Date	March 13–19, 2002
Location	Paktia Province, Afghanistan
Result	Coalition victory

Belligerents
United States; Canada	Taliban; Al-Qaeda

Commanders and leaders
(Canada) Pat Stogran	?

Strength
Battalion-sized (600–1,500)	?

Casualties and losses
0 killed Unknown wounded	3 killed Unknown wounded

Operation Harpoon was the code name of a joint American–Canadian military operation which took place in March 2002 in Paktia Province, Afghanistan. This operation took place in roughly the same region as Operation Anaconda. It was also the first major Canadian combat mission in half a century.

== Operation ==
The Operation started in the early hours of March 13 using land and air forces to eliminate pockets of Taliban and Al-Qaeda resistance in the Arma Mountains in eastern Afghanistan. The land component was a battalion-sized Canadian and an American force from the 187th Regt of the 101'st Abn Div (Rakkasans) under the command of Lieutenant-Colonel Pat Stogran, the commanding officer of the 3 PPCLI (Princess Patricia's Canadian Light Infantry) battle group.

On March 14, 2002, Stogran's Canadian troops led one of his American platoons to a cave-and-bunker complex, where the Americans proceeded to destroy several bunkers. The Canadian and American force also investigated 30 caves and four mortar positions, resulting in three enemy casualties. There were no Casualties for the coalition.
