= Princess Pat (song) =

Canadian military cadence and campfire song

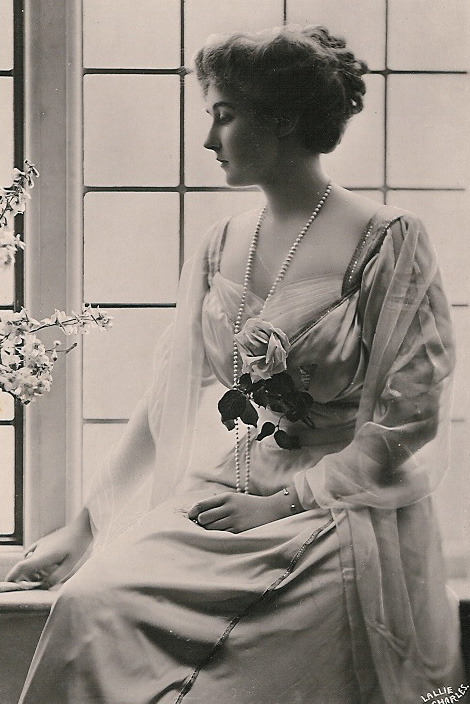
Princess Patricia of Connaught

"Princess Pat" is a 1917 North American song, popular to sing at campfires. It began as a military cadence of Princess Patricia's Canadian Light Infantry.

== Lyrics ==
This is a repeat after me song (This is a repeat after me song)

The Princess Pat (The Princess Pat)
Lived in a tree (Lived in a tree)
She sailed across (She sailed across)
The seven seas (The seven seas)

She sailed across (She sailed across)
The channel two (The channel two)
And took with her (And took with her)
A Ric-A-Bamboo. (A Ric-A-Bamboo)

Now what is that? (Now what is that?)
It's something made (It's something made)
By the Princess Pat, (By the Princess Pat)

It's red and gold, (It's red and gold)
And purple too, (And purple too)
That's why it's called (That's why it's called)
A Ric-A-Bamboo. (A Ric-A-Bamboo)

Now Captain Jack, (Now Captain Jack)
Had a mighty fine crew, (Had a mighty fine crew)
They sailed across (They sailed across)
The channel too, (The channel too)

But his ship sank (But his ship sank)
And yours will too (And yours will too)
If you don't take (If you don't take)
A Ric-A-Bamboo. (A Ric-A-Bamboo)

Now what is that, (Now what is that)
It's something made (It's something made)
By the Princess Pat, (By the Princess Pat)

It's red and gold,(It's red and gold)
And purple too, (And purple too)
That's why it's called (That's why it's called)
A Ric-A-Bamboo. (A Ric-A-Bamboo)

The Princess Pat (The Princess Pat)
Saw Captain Jack, (Saw Captain Jack)
She reeled him in, (She reeled him in)
And brought him back. (And brought him back)

She saved his life, (She saved his life)
And his crew's too. (And his crew's too)
And she saved 'em with (And she saved 'em with)
A Ric-A-Bamboo. (A Ric-A-Bamboo)

Now what is that, (Now what is that)
It's something made (It's something made)
By the Princess Pat, (By the Princess Pat)

It's red and gold, (It's red and gold)
And purple too, (And purple too)
That's why it's called (That's why it's called)
A Ric-A-Bamboo. (A Ric-A-Bamboo)

== The Real Princess Pat and her Colors ==
Princess Patricia, the Colonel-in-Chief, designed and made by hand the regimental colors of the Canadian Forces infantry regiment, named in her honour. They are a crimson flag with a circular purple centre. In the circle are gold initials V P which stand for Victoria Patricia. The regimental colours became known as the "Ric-A-Dam-Doo", reportedly from the Gaelic for "cloth of your mother". This color was carried in every regimental action during World War I.

== The Ric-a-Dam-Doo ==
The original Ric-a-Dam-Doo is now in The Military Museums in Calgary.

It's red and gold, and purple too.
