= Parvillers-le-Quesnoy =

- Commune
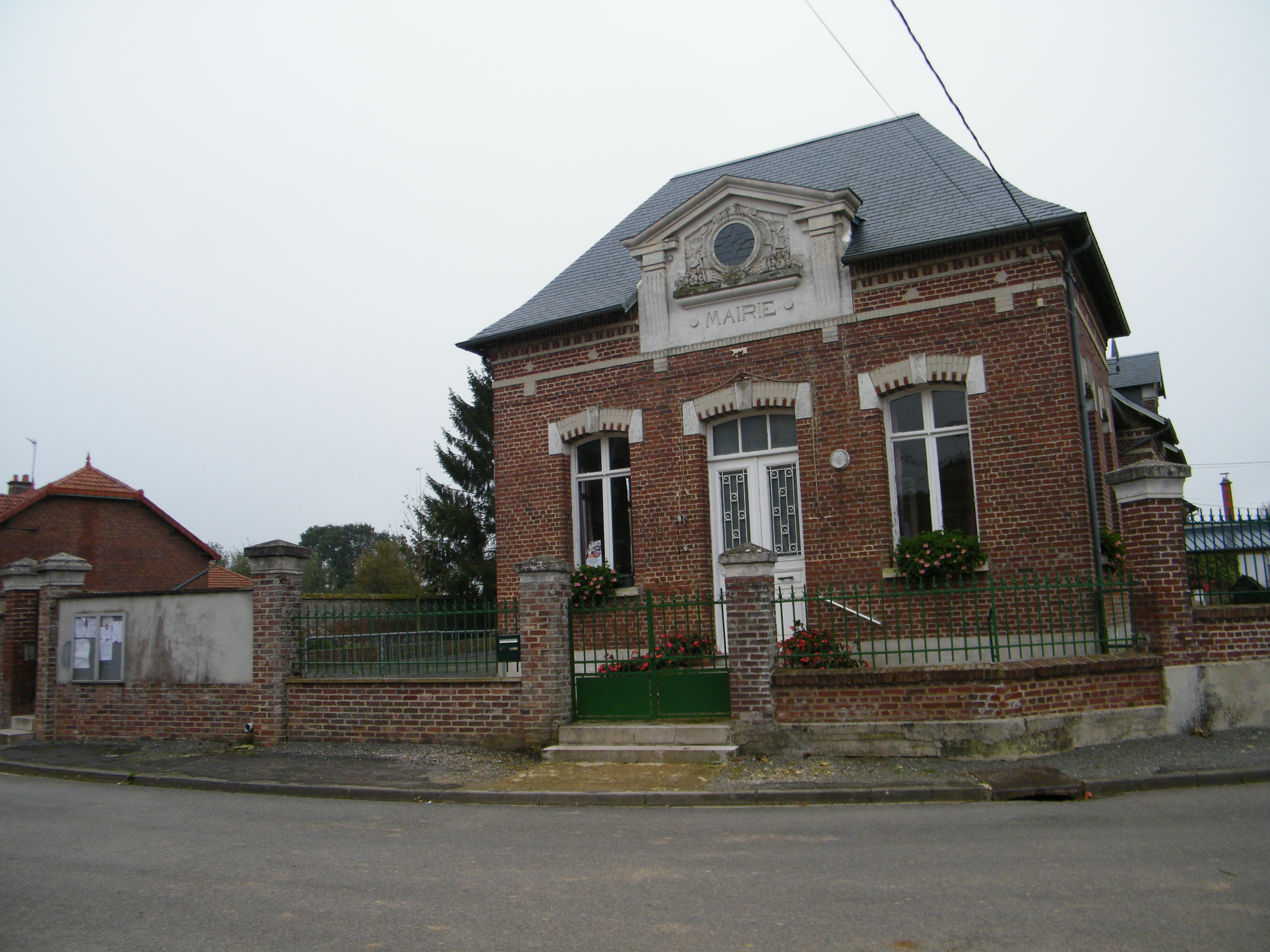
- The town hall in Parvillers-le-Quesnoy

- Coat of arms
- Location of Parvillers-le-Quesnoy
- Location within France Location within Hauts-de-France
- Coordinates: 49°44′50″N 2°44′21″E
- Country: France
- Region: Hauts-de-France
- Department: Somme
- Arrondissement: Péronne
- Canton: Moreuil
- Intercommunality: CC Terre de Picardie

Government
  - Mayor (2020–2026): Christian Balcone
- Area^{1}: 9.5 km^{2} (3.7 sq mi)
- Elevation: 101 m (331 ft)
- Highest elevation: 106 m (348 ft)
- Lowest elevation: 89 m (292 ft)
- Population (2023): 244
  - Density: 26/km^{2} (67/sq mi)
- Time zone: UTC+01:00 (CET)
  - Summer (DST): UTC+02:00 (CEST)
- INSEE/Postal code: 80617 /80700
- ^{1} French Land Register data, which excludes lakes, ponds, glaciers > 1 km^{2} (0.386 sq mi or 247 acres) and river estuaries.

Parvillers-le-Quesnoy is a commune in the Somme department in Hauts-de-France in northern France.

== Geography ==
The commune is situated on the D238 and D34 crossroads, 40 kilometres (25 mi) southeast of Amiens.

== Population ==
Historical population
Year	Pop.	±% p.a.
1968	174	—
1975	171	−0.25%
1982	154	−1.48%
1990	189	+2.59%
1999	221	+1.75%
2007	200	−1.24%
2012	225	+2.38%
2017	233	+0.70%
2023	244	+0.77%
Source: INSEE

== See also ==
- Communes of the Somme department
