= Canadian Machine Gun Corps =

- Active: 16 April 1917 – 15 December 1936
- Country: Canada
- Branch: Canadian Expeditionary Force (1917–1920); Canadian Militia (1919–1936)
- Type: Machine gunners
- Role: Direct and indirect machine gun fire
- Part of: Canadian Expeditionary Force (1917–1918); Permanent Active Militia (1919–1923); Non-Permanent Active Militia (1919–1936)
- Nickname: "Emma Gees"
- Engagements: First World War

Commanders
- Notable commanders: Raymond Brutinel

The Canadian Machine Gun Corps (CMGC) was an administrative corps of the Canadian Expeditionary Force (CEF) and of the Canadian Militia. The CMGC was first formed as part of the Canadian Expeditionary Force on the Western Front during the First World War. Before the CMGC was organized in 1917, machine guns in the Canadian Expeditionary Force (CEF) evolved from a small, battalion-level attachment into a specialized corps-level weapon system. By 1918, the CMGC consisted of four battalions (each of four machine gun companies), and five independent motor machine gun batteries, attached to each of the four Canadian divisions. In addition, the 20th Machine Gun Company CEF served at Vladivostok as a unit in the Canadian Siberian Expeditionary Force.

The Canadian Permanent Machine Gun Brigade was organized in the Permanent Force on 16 April 1917. The brigade was redesignated the Royal Canadian Permanent Machine Gun Brigade on 16 June 1921. This brigade was disbanded on 1 November 1923. The Non-Permanent Active Militia component of the CMGC continued to serve until it was disbanded as part of the 1936 militia reorganization, and its roles were transferred to the newly formed infantry (machine gun) battalions.

== Early history ==
In 1914, Canada entered the First World War with little prepared machine-gun capacity. The Canadian Militia followed British doctrine, and only four machine guns were available at Valcartier for instructional purposes when the First Contingent was mobilized.

The 1st Canadian Division went overseas with four Colt machine guns per infantry battalion. The Colt (nicknamed the “Potato-Digger”) was air-cooled, portable, and useful in principle, but it was prone to jamming after rapid fire and proved difficult to maintain in the mud and dust of Flanders. Private financing helped create some early machine-gun units. Joe Boyle of the Yukon funded a machine-gun company, and other wealthy businessmen sponsored similar units, but these did not become part of the 1st Canadian Division that deployed to Britain and France in late 1914 and early 1915.

By the time the 1st Canadian Division entered the trenches in February 1915, its machine-gun organization had doubled. Each infantry battalion had two sections and four guns, with a total establishment of 35 all ranks and 13 horses per battalion machine-gun detachment. A typical section was organized around a gun crew of six: one man carried and positioned the tripod, another mounted and fired the gun, and others carried ammunition and assisted with loading and cooling. A Vickers could fire about 600 rounds per minute, but its gun, tripod, water, ammunition, and spare parts made it difficult to move quickly under fire.

=== Ypres ===
The Canadians’ first major test came during the Second Battle of Ypres in April 1915. German machine guns inflicted severe losses on Canadian attacks, including an assault near Kitchener’s Wood in which a company of the 2nd Battalion was largely destroyed after advancing into the open under German automatic fire. The battle exposed two major problems: Canada lacked enough machine guns, and the Colt was unreliable under field conditions. Canadian commanders reported that the gun’s extractor failed, its exposed mechanism clogged with sand and dirt, and its heavy tripod made movement difficult. Arthur Currie’s 2nd Brigade concluded that the weapon was unsuited to service conditions and recommended re-equipping with the British Vickers.

=== Late 1915–1916 ===
In July 1915, the CEF began issuing the Lewis light machine gun experimentally at four guns per battalion. The Lewis was lighter, air-cooled, fed from a 47-round pan magazine, and could be carried and operated by a small team, making it better suited to infantry platoons and mobile operations. At the same time, the heavier guns—Colts and, increasingly, Vickers—were withdrawn from dispersed battalion control and grouped under brigade headquarters. By October 1915, the establishment had increased to eight Lewis guns per battalion and 16 Vickers guns per brigade.

This created the basic division of labour that would define Canadian machine-gun doctrine:

Weapon	Typical level	Role
Colt / Vickers	Brigade	Concentrated defensive fire, barrages, and indirect fire
Lewis Gun	Battalion, later Platoon	Immediate infantry support, covering fire, raids, and consolidation

The next major reorganization came in early 1916. The 1st Canadian Machine Gun Company was formed in January 1916, and 15 more were created before the end of the year. These companies took over the heavier Vickers guns from the infantry battalions and operated them under brigade command. The Vickers replaced the Colt in 1916. It was heavier and less mobile, but much more dependable, water-cooled, belt-fed, and capable of sustained fire—qualities that made it suitable for prolonged defensive engagements and indirect barrage missions.

By late 1916, the Canadian Corps had four divisions, with each division supported by four machine-gun companies. As well, the Canadian Cavalry Brigade was supported by its own Brigade Machine Gun Squadron (the cavalry equivalent of a company). For example, the 7th Canadian Machine Gun Company was formed in the field in March 1916 from machine gunners of the 7th Canadian Infantry Brigade and was formally designated in July 1916.

=== The Somme ===
During the Battle of the Somme in 1916, Canadian machine gunners used massed Vickers fire both defensively and offensively. During the assault on Courcelette on 15 September 1916, the 5th Canadian Infantry Brigade was supported by 44 Vickers guns divided into “left” and “right” groups; concentrated fire helped suppress German positions and support the infantry advance.

The Somme also demonstrated the limits of machine-gun support. Lewis guns sent forward with assaulting infantry were vulnerable to shellfire, and attacks without adequate suppression often ran into devastating German machine-gun fire. Canadian units concluded that machine guns needed better coordination, communications, ammunition supply, and planning.

=== Vimy Ridge ===
By early 1917, the CEF was moving toward a more specialized machine-gun organization. Canadian brigades were instructed to equip their battalions with 14 Lewis guns each, while brigade machine-gun companies held 16 Vickers guns and numerous mountings. Canadian gunners became known for concentrated brigade-level fire and for pioneering overhead and barrage-fire techniques.

At the Battle of Vimy Ridge, Canadian machine gunners refined indirect fire: heavy guns were locked at high elevation to fire over the heads of advancing infantry and onto roads, communication trenches, and supply routes behind the German lines. During the 9 April 1917 assault, both Canadian and some British machine-gun units employed 362 Vickers guns: 104 advanced with the infantry while 258 provided indirect barrage fire. Nearly five million rounds were allocated for the barrage.

== History (1917–1918) ==
The success of these methods, together with continued debate over whether machine guns belonged to infantry or required a separate command structure, made a dedicated corps (much like along the lines of the British Army's Machine Gun Corps) increasingly attractive. As such, on 16 April 1917—only a week after Vimy—the Canadian Machine Gun Corps (CMGC) was first formed to take charge of all Canadian Corps machine guns, finally giving gunners a formal chain of command from the individual Vickers crew through brigade, division, and corps headquarters.

The official publication of the formation occurred in the Canadians' Routine Order 558 of 22 February 1917. It was initially composed of:

- Machine Gun Squadron, Canadian Cavalry Brigade,
- Machine gun companies,
- 1st Motor Machine Gun Brigade and motor machine gun batteries,
- A depot organized in England on 4 January 1917 (authorized by Canadians' Routine Order 150 of same date).

By 1918, the CMGC had been reorganized into four machine-gun battalions—one for each Canadian division—with each battalion containing four machine-gun companies.

By the time of the Armistice on 11 November 1918, the corps comprised a corps headquarters, four Vickers-gun battalions, two motor machine-gun brigades, a machine-gun school, and a reinforcement depot in France. Its recorded strength was 422 officers, 8,349 other ranks, and 464 machine guns.

In addition, the 20th Machine Gun Company, CEF served at Vladivostok as a unit in the Canadian Siberian Expeditionary Force.

== Post war ==
The CEF component of the CMGC was officially disbanded on 15 November 1920. A separate Permanent Force formation, originally the Canadian Permanent Machine Gun Brigade, had been organized on 16 April 1917. It became the Royal Canadian Permanent Machine Gun Brigade on 16 June 1921 and was disbanded on 1 November 1923.

The Non-Permanent Active Militia component continued until the 1936 Militia reorganization. It was then disbanded, with its role transferred to newly created infantry (machine gun) battalions.

== Victoria Cross recipient ==
Lieutenant Hugh McKenzie was posthumously awarded the Victoria Cross for his actions on 30 October 1917 during the Battle of Passchendaele.

== Memorials ==
The CMGC donated a wall plaque at St. George's Church in Ypres.

== Related units ==
This unit was allied with the Machine Gun Corps of the British Army.

== See also ==
- Australian Machine Gun Corps
- New Zealand Machine Gun Corps
