= Canadian Army =

Land component of the Canadian Armed Forces

- Armée canadienne
- Badge of the Canadian Army
- Founded: 19 May 1855; 171 years ago (Note: The Canadian Army originates from the Province of Canada's "Active Militia", created through the Militia Act of 1855. However, several Canadian Army units perpetuate the battle honours of Canadian units from the War of 1812. The Active Militia was later adopted by the Canadian confederation through the Militia Act of 1868. In 1940, an order in council retitled the Active Militia to the Canadian Army. In 1968, the Canadian Army was formally amalgamated into the Canadian Armed Forces, serving as the forces' land component.)
- Country: Canada (Note: Province of Canada (1855–1867))
- Type: Army
- Role: Land warfare
- Size: 44,000 total personnel: 22,500 active; 21,500 reserve (includes 5,300 Canadian Rangers)
- Part of: Canadian Armed Forces
- Headquarters: NDHQ Carling, Ottawa, Ontario
- Motto: Vigilamus pro te (Latin for 'We stand on guard for thee')
- Colour: Red
- March: "The Great Little Army"
- Mascot: Juno the Bear
- Engagements: Fenian raids (1866–1870); Red River Rebellion (1870); North-West Rebellion (1885); Second Boer War (1899–1902); First World War (1914–1918); Russian Civil War (1918–1919); Second World War (1939–1945); Korean War (1950–1953); Medak Pocket (1993); War in Afghanistan (2001–2014)
- Website: www.canada.ca/en/army.html

Commanders
- Commander-in-Chief: Charles III, King of Canada
- Commander of the Canadian Army: Lieutenant-General Michael Wright
- Deputy Commander of the Canadian Army: Major-General Peter Scott
- Canadian Army Sergeant Major: Chief Warrant Officer Christopher Robin

Insignia
- Flag

The Canadian Army (French: Armée canadienne) is the ground force of Canada, and one of the three environmental commands of the Canadian Armed Forces, responsible for conventional land operations. As of 2024, it includes about 22,500 Regular Force personnel and 21,500 reservists, including 5,300 Canadian Rangers. Headquartered at NDHQ Carling in Ottawa, it maintains bases and facilities across Canada. The commander of the Canadian Army reports to the Chief of the Defence Staff.

The army traces its roots to the colonial-era Canadian militia, though nearly all of its existing units were established after the Militia Act of 1855, which created the Active Militia in the Province of Canada. Shortly after Confederation, the Active Militia became Canada's sole functional military force, participating in several conflicts before being renamed the Canadian Army during the Second World War. It was reorganized as Force Mobile Command in 1965, ahead of the 1968 unification of Canada's military. Renamed Land Force Command in 1992, it reverted to the Canadian Army name in 2011.

The army is organized into four principal formations, which includes three divisions comprising Regular and Reserve Force elements, and the Canadian Army Doctrine and Training Centre for training and doctrine development. The three divisions include several brigade groups made up of units from the Royal Regiment of Canadian Artillery, Royal Canadian Armoured Corps, and Royal Canadian Infantry Corps. The army operates a variety of equipment sourced domestically and from other countries.

== History ==
=== Origins and the Sedentary Militia ===
The Canadian Army traces its origins to colonial militias established in New France and British North America. These community-based militias supported French and British military actions on the continent. Prior to Canadian Confederation in 1867, militia acts passed in the Province of Canada, Nova Scotia, and New Brunswick required males aged 16 to between 50 and 60 to serve in local sedentary militias, unorganized, mostly untrained forces mustered only infrequently each year.

Some of the Army's oldest units trace their lineage to these sedentary militia units, like the predecessor of the Governor General's Horse Guards, the Governor General's Body Guard. Several units also perpetuate the lineage of Canadian units raised during the War of 1812. However, most active Army units were formed following the transformation of the Province of Canada's military system under the Militia Acts of 1846 and 1855.

=== Development of the Active Militia ===
Plans for a trained volunteer "active militia" in the Province of Canada began with the Militia Act of 1846, although actual active militia units were not formed until a more practical framework was established through the Militia Act of 1855. The Militia Act of 1868 formally integrated the colonial Canadian Militia, both the Sedentary and Active components, into the new federal framework. However, the Sedentary Militia fell into disuse by 1873, leaving the Active Militia as Canada's only functional military force.

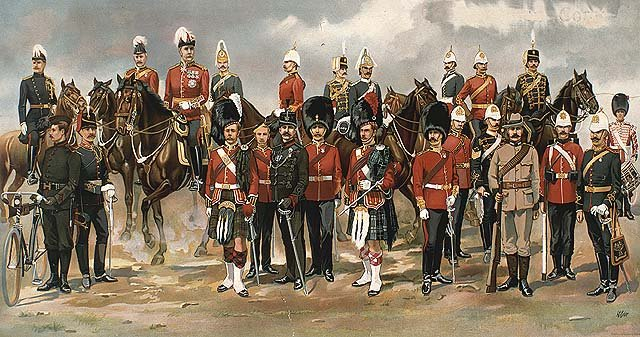
Uniforms of Canadian Militia units, c. 1898

In 1871, the Active Militia formed its first full-time volunteer units, which later became the nucleus of Permanent Force. By the 1880s, Permanent Force had expanded beyond artillery to include infantry and cavalry corps. During the late 19th century, the Active Militia repelled the Fenian raids from 1866 to 1871 and defeated the North-West Resistance in 1885. Active Militia officers first participated in overseas service during the Nile Expedition of 1884 to 1885, while Active Militia units undertook their first official overseas deployment during the Second Boer War from 1900 to 1902.

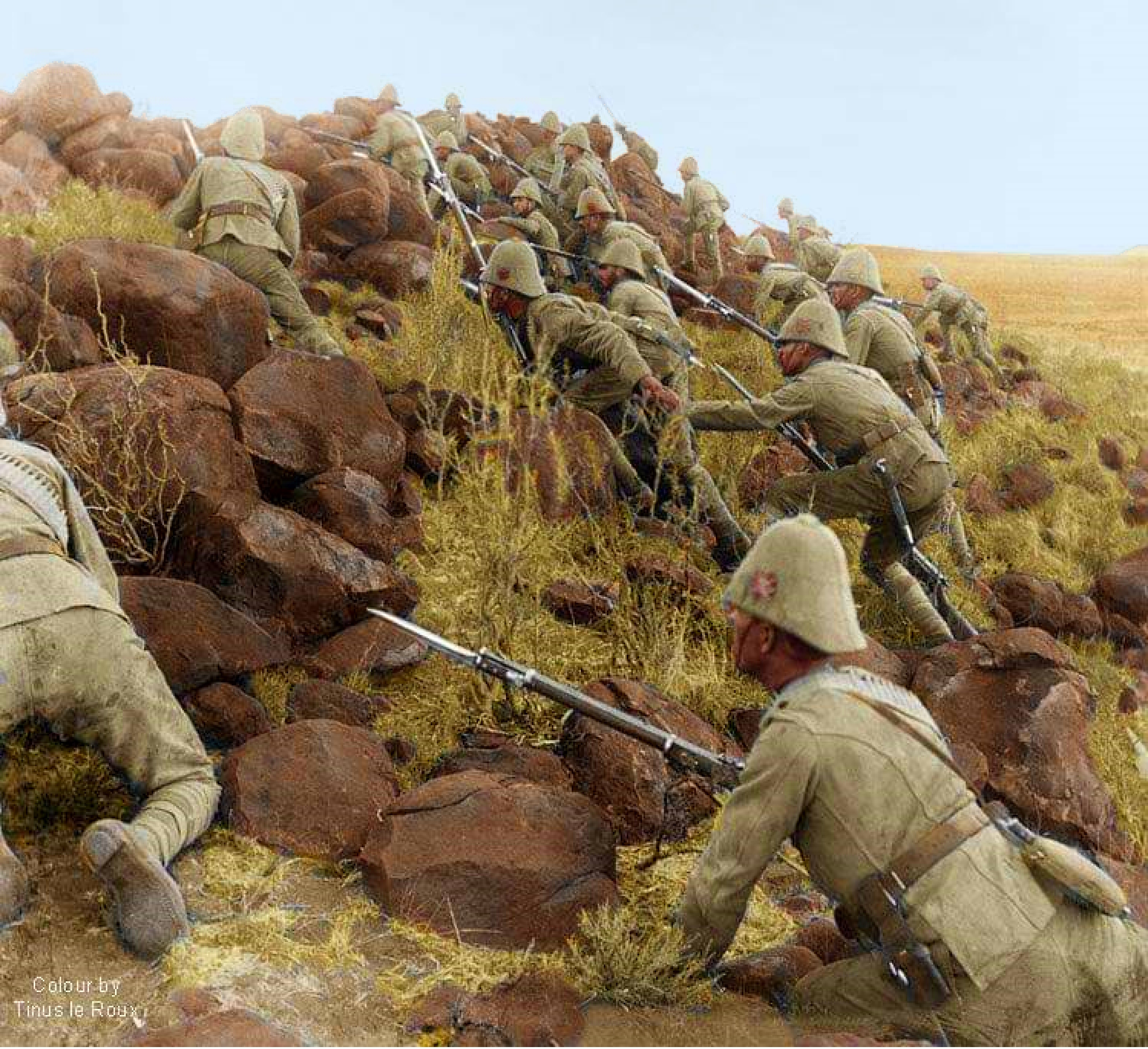
Canadian soldiers at the Battle of Paardeberg during the Second Boer War, 1900

However, by the end of the 19th century, the militia remained limited in capability. Major-General Edward Hutton, former General Officer Commanding the Militia of Canada, described the Militia as "a collection of military units without cohesion, without staff, and without those military departments by which an army is moved, fed, or ministered to in sickness."

Reforms under Frederick Borden, minister of militia and defence from 1896 to 1911, revitalized the force through the creation of engineering, medical, signalling, and support corps in the early 1900s. In 1904, the position of General Officer Commanding, traditionally held by a British Army officer, was replaced by the Canadian-appointed Chief of the General Staff of the Militia. Policies adopted by Canada at the 1907 Imperial Conference and the 1909 Defence Conference led the Canadian Militia to maintain broad uniformity with the British Army in organization, equipment, and training doctrine.

=== World War I and Interwar Period ===
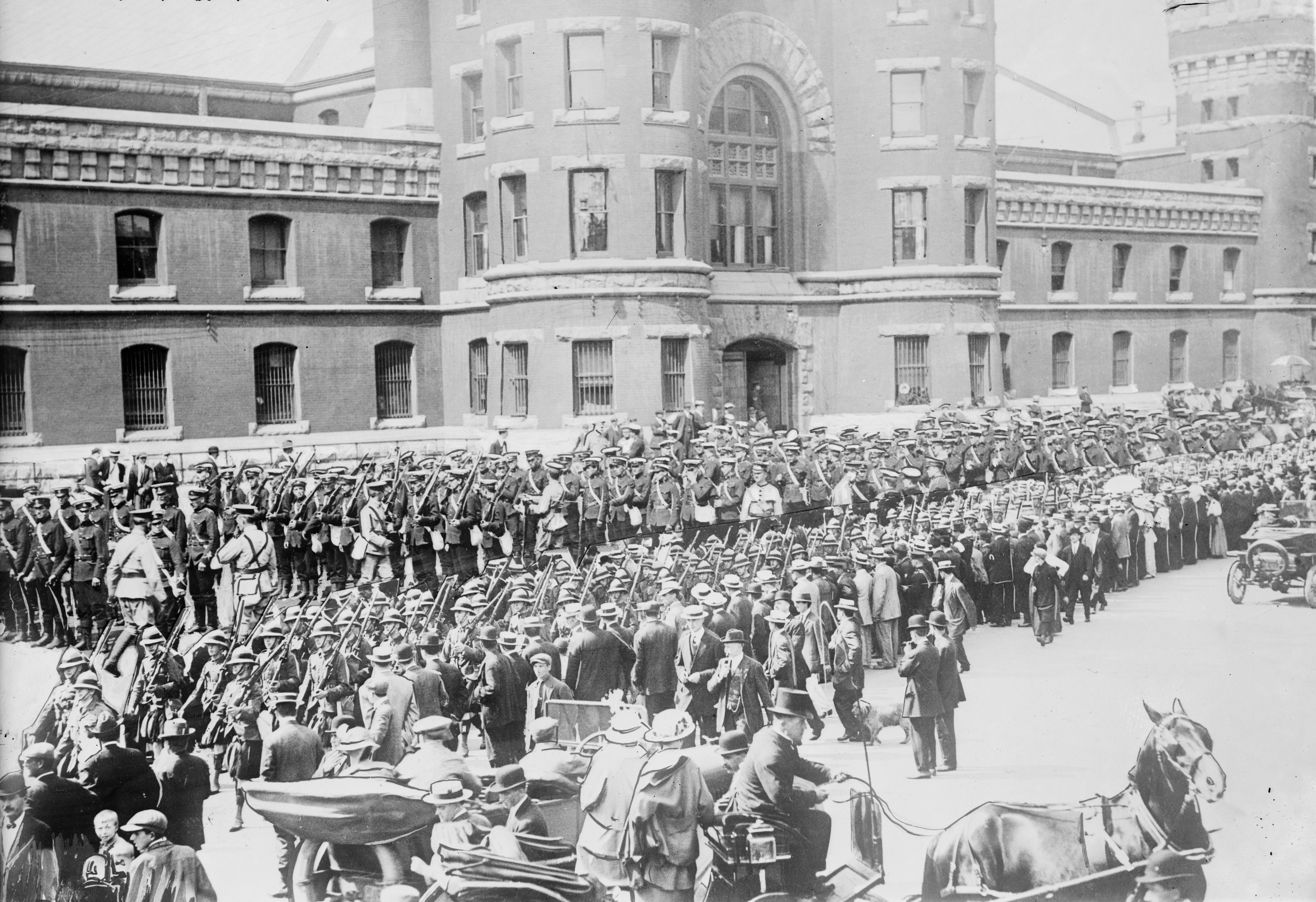
Members of the 48th Highlanders of Canada, 12th York Rangers, and the 10th Royal Grenadiers leave for training camp, 1914

At the outbreak of World War I, the Canadian militia was not mobilized, with existing mobilization plans for the force considered too slow to meet the urgent demands of the war. Instead, a new force was formed, the Canadian Expeditionary Force (CEF). (Note: Although Permanent Force as a whole was not mobilized, select militia units, like the Royal Canadian Regiment, were deployed as part of the CEF.) Although the militia provided only a small number of trained soldiers, it offered the foundation on which a national army could be built. Most CEF officers originated from the Non-Permanent Active Militia (NPAM). The militia's administrative structure and staff were also utilized to recruit personnel for the CEF.

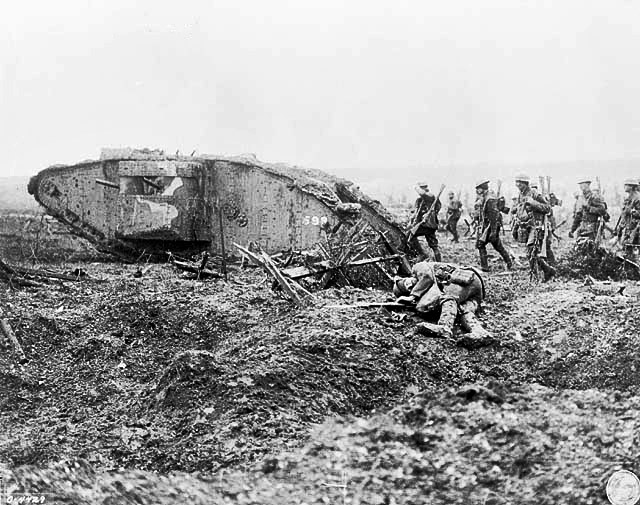
Canadian soldiers advance during the Battle of Vimy Ridge, 1917

The militia's pre-war limited development was evident in the appointment of a British lieutenant-general to command the 1st Canadian Division until 1917, when command of the Canadian Corps passed to Lieutenant-General Arthur Currie, a former NPAM officer. Canadian units first entered the front lines in February 1915, and by 1918, the Canadian Corps was regarded as "the most powerful self-contained striking force on any battlefront," in part because it retained four-battalion infantry brigades while British Army brigades were reduced to three battalions. More than 620,000 people served in the CEF, with 60,000 Canadians died during the war.

Following the war, steps were taken within the Canadian Militia to preserve the legacy and battle honours of CEF units. Two CEF units were incorporated into Permanent Force, while others had their honours perpetuated through NPAM regiments. In 1923, the civilian portfolio responsible for militia affairs was consolidated with the other service portfolios under a single Minister of National Defence. During the 1930s, the militia began a program of rearmament and reorganization, although its budget reflected its position as the lowest priority compared with the navy and the air force.

=== World War II and post-war period ===
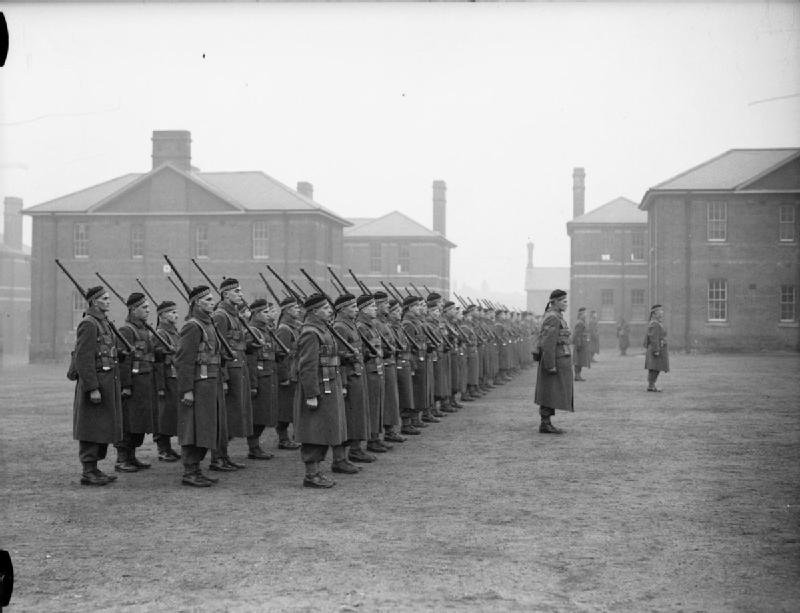
Toronto Scottish Regiment soldiers deployed to the UK months after the outbreak of World War II, 1939

The Government of Canada ordered a partial mobilization of the militia on 25 August, followed by full mobilization after the Canadian declaration of war on Germany on 10 September. Unlike the First World War, the mobilized units were drawn largely from existing militia battalions rather than newly created formations. In November 1940, the Canadian Militia was formally retitled as the Canadian Army, with the Permanent Active Militia becoming Canadian Army (Active) and NPAM becoming Canadian Army (Reserve).

Canadian Army units saw little action in the early stages of the war. One brigade briefly took the field during the fall of France in 1940, after which Canadian Army units were largely occupied with the defence of the UK against a possible German invasion. The Canadian Army later played major roles in the Allied invasion of Sicily and Italy, the Battle of Normandy, and the North West Europe campaign, particularly the liberation of the Netherlands, remaining in combat until 5 May 1945 with the German surrender at Lüneburg Heath. During the conflict, the First Canadian Army was formed. It became the largest field army ever assembled by the Canadian Army, with more than 450,000 personnel under the command of General Henry Crerar. (Note: At its peak, the First Canadian Army had more than 450,000 soldiers. This included personnel from Canadian units and from British, Polish, American, Belgian, and Dutch units placed under the First Canadian Army's operational command.) Like in the First World War, the Canadian Army served under British higher command in operations. During the war, 730,000 people served in the Canadian Army, 24,500 of whom died.

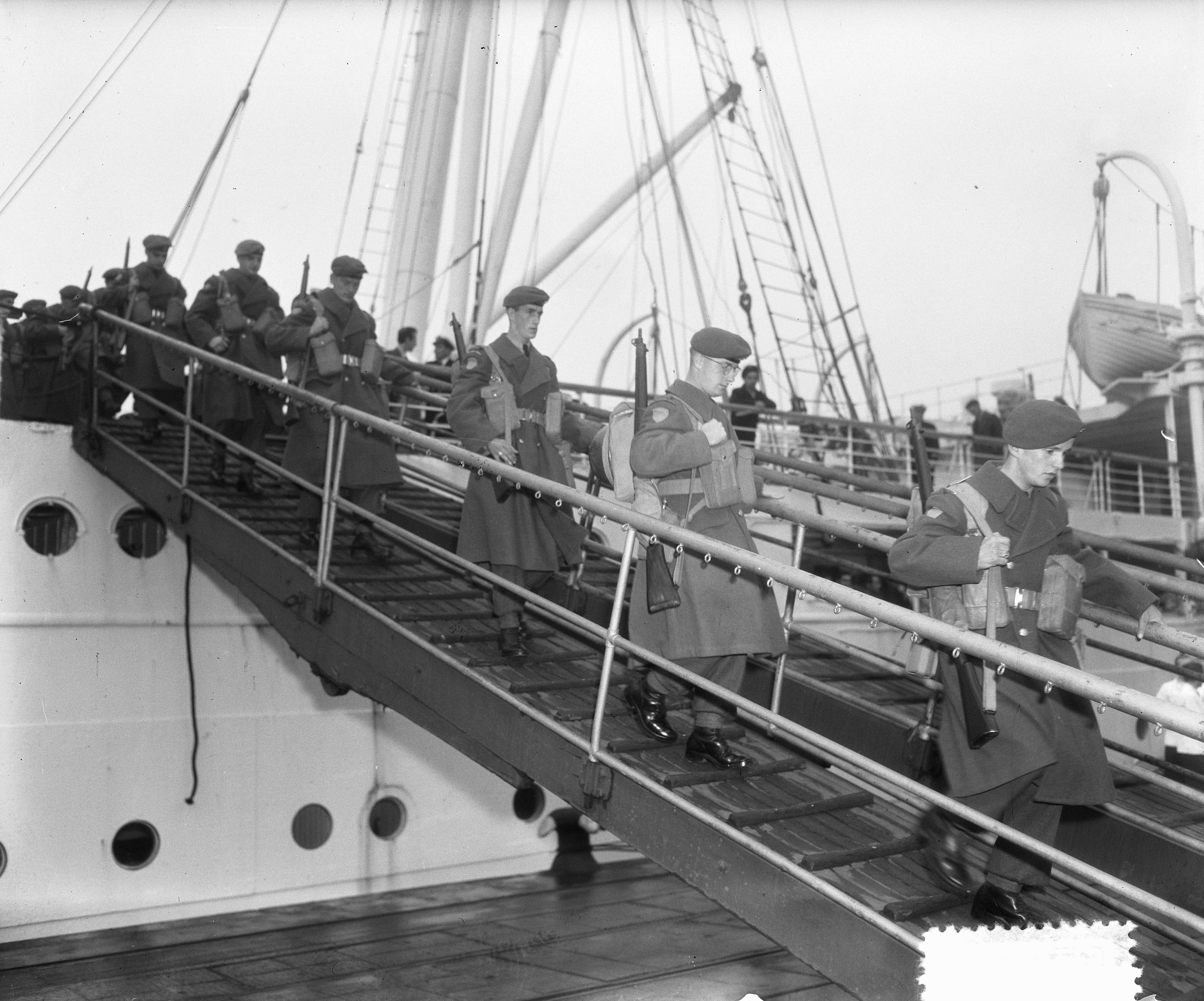
The 27th Canadian Infantry Brigade, created for service in West Germany disembarks in Rotterdam, 1951

Although the Canadian Army demobilized after the Second World War, it did not reduce its numbers to pre-war levels like it did following the First World War. Its participation in NATO in 1949 also led the Canadian Army to its largest peacetime size. As part of its commitments to NATO, the Canadian Army had detachments in Europe.

During this period, Canada also contributed to early UN peacekeeping operations, like the United Nations Truce Supervision Organization in 1948, the United Nations Emergency Force during the 1956 Suez Crisis and the United Nations Peacekeeping Force in Cyprus in 1964. The Canadian Army also provided several units, later consolidated into the 25th Canadian Infantry Brigade, to serve under the 1st Commonwealth Division of the United Nations Command during the Korean War.

=== Post-unification ===
The Canadian Army was reduced in size during the 1960s due to budgetary and manpower constraints. By the mid-1960s, the Canadian government began a process of unifying the country's separate armed service branches into a single force. As a part of the anticipated unification, the Army was reorganized into Force Mobile Command in 1965, before it was unified with the other two service branches, the Royal Canadian Navy and the Royal Canadian Air Force, to form the single-service Canadian Armed Forces. This resulted in some units being reduced to nil strength and transferred to the Supplementary Order of Battle. However, other new units were also created to increase French Canadian representation.

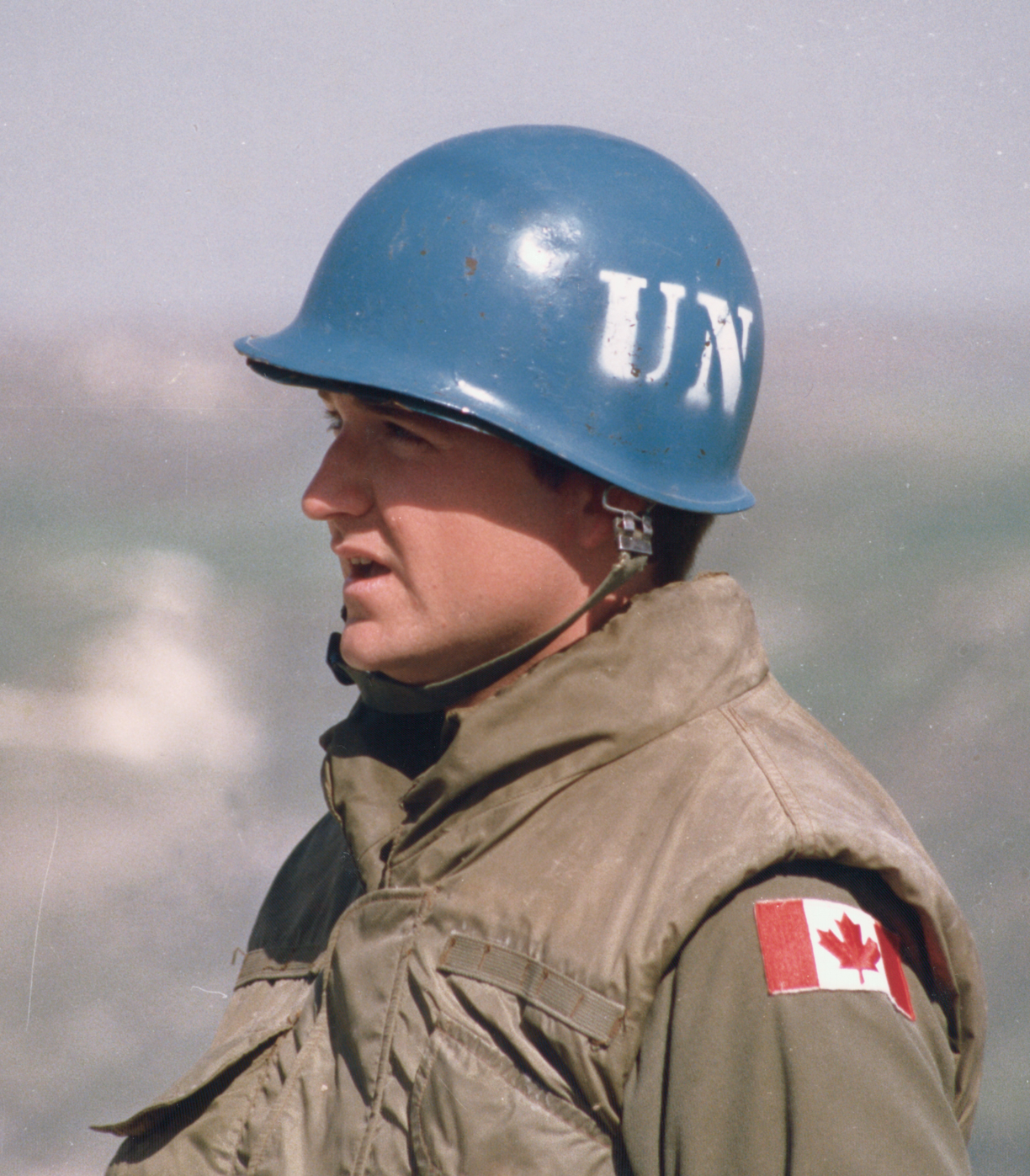
A Canadian soldier on a United Nations peacekeeping mission, 1976

The rationale for unification was to improve efficiency and reduce cost. However, unification efforts faced resistance from army regiments, who viewed them as an attempt to erase their history, traditions, and identities. Regimental identities and ethos were gradually restored within Mobile Command during the 1970s and 1980s. During the later Cold War years, the CAF was reduced in size and scaled back troop deployments in Europe, although it continued to uphold peacekeeping commitments, participating in every UN peacekeeping mission until 1989.

The end of the Cold War prompted the CAF to end its European military deployments, although it did play a limited role in the 1991 Gulf War and took part in several peacekeeping missions. In 1992, Force Mobile Command was redesignated as Land Force Command as part of broader post-Cold War restructuring. Many of the army's post-Cold War peacekeeping missions, particularly in Yugoslavia and Rwanda, became volatile, with peacekeepers facing aggression and lacking adequate support. The misconduct of the Canadian Airborne Regiment during operations in Somalia also led to intense public scrutiny and the regiment's eventual disbandment.

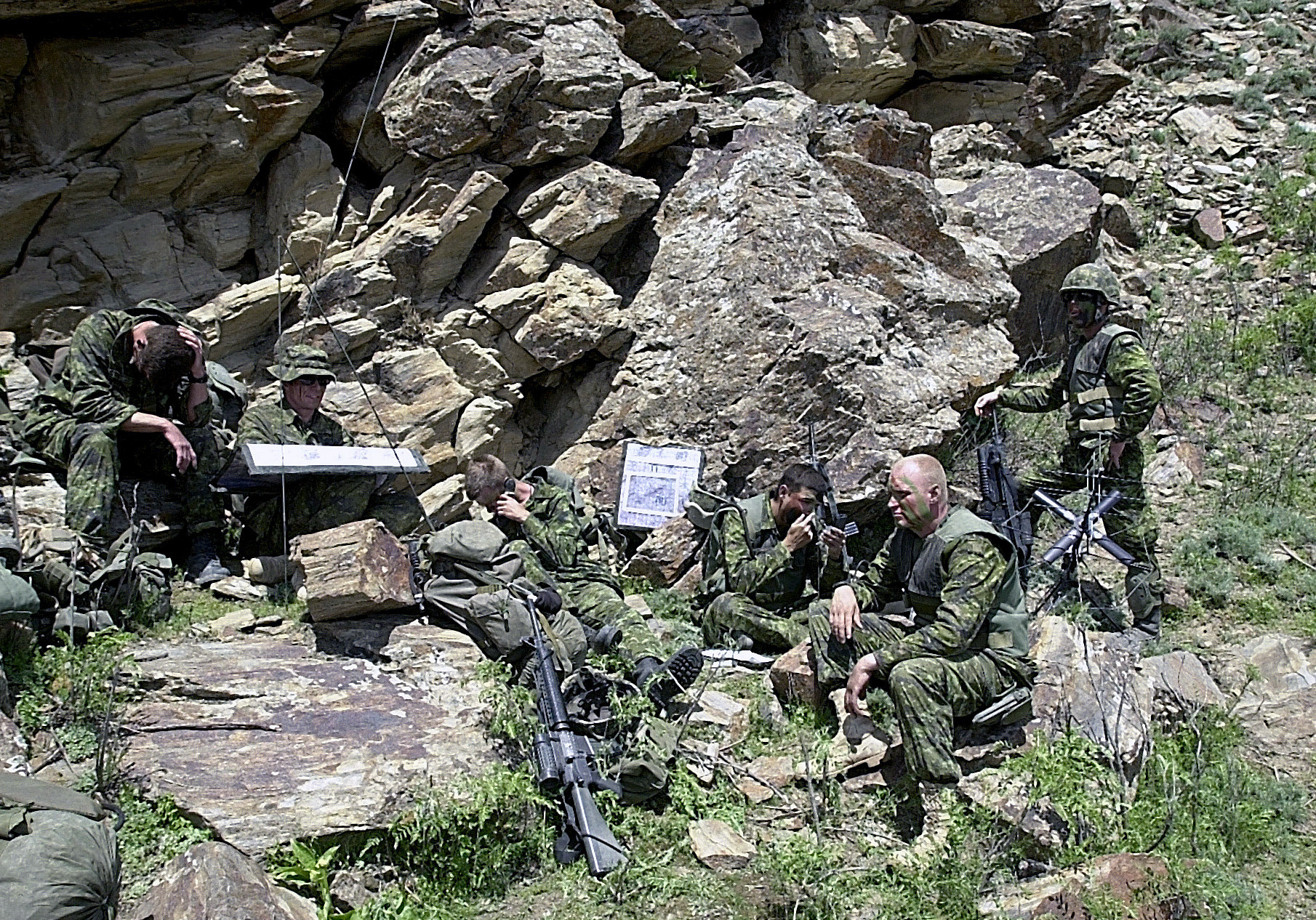
Members of Princess Patricia's Canadian Light Infantry in Afghanistan, 2002

The army hit its lowest enlistment numbers in decades in 2001, before it rebounded as a result of the War in Afghanistan. The 12-year Afghan mission was the longest military campaign undertaken by the CAF. In 2011, Land Forces Command was renamed to the Canadian Army, restoring the pre-unification name for Canada's military land forces.

Following the document Inflection Point 2025, the commander of the army Lieutenant-General Michael Wright ordered staff to prepare a significant reorganization from its conventionally configured divisions to four task specific formations. The Defence of Canada Division will be primary reserve, heavy with the Canadian Rangers, with integrated air and missile defences. The Manoeuvre Division will group the regular force brigades for conventional warfare, creation of a sustainment brigade and a light infantry regiment from the three existing light battalions. In support will be a training formation and a support division.

== Structure ==
The Canadian Army is the land component of the Canadian Armed Forces, and the CAF's largest element. Command is held by the commander of the Canadian Army, a lieutenant-general, with a major-general serving as their deputy. The commander of the Canadian Army reports to the chief of the Defence Staff, who, in turn, reports to the minister of National Defence, the head of the Department of National Defence.

Four formations reports to Canadian Army Headquarters, a "manoeuvre" division, a "defence of Canada" division, a support division, and a training formation, Canadian Army Doctrine and Training Centre (CADTC). Canadian Forces Military Police regiments are generally situated with a division and placed under its operational control, although they are not formally a component of the division.

=== Regular Force and Army Reserve ===
Army personnel are organized into Regular Force and the Canadian Army Reserve, the latter also called the Militia. The Regular Force is made up of officers and non-commissioned members enrolled for continuing, full-time military service.

The Army Reserve is made up of officers and non-commissioned members enrolled for service that is not continuous or full-time. The reserves provides the basis for mobilizing additional forces and supports both domestic and expeditionary operations. Army Reserve units are organized within 2nd Canadian Division, with each unit including a small cadre of Regular Force personnel for administrative and training support. Regular Force units may also draw on Army Reserve personnel to augment its capabilities, and reservists may volunteer for full-time service to support domestic or expeditionary operations.

=== Formations ===
The Army's four formations include 1st Canadian Division, the 2nd Canadian Division, the Canadian Army Support Division, and the Canadian Army Doctrine and Training Centre (CADTC).

==== 1st Canadian Division ====
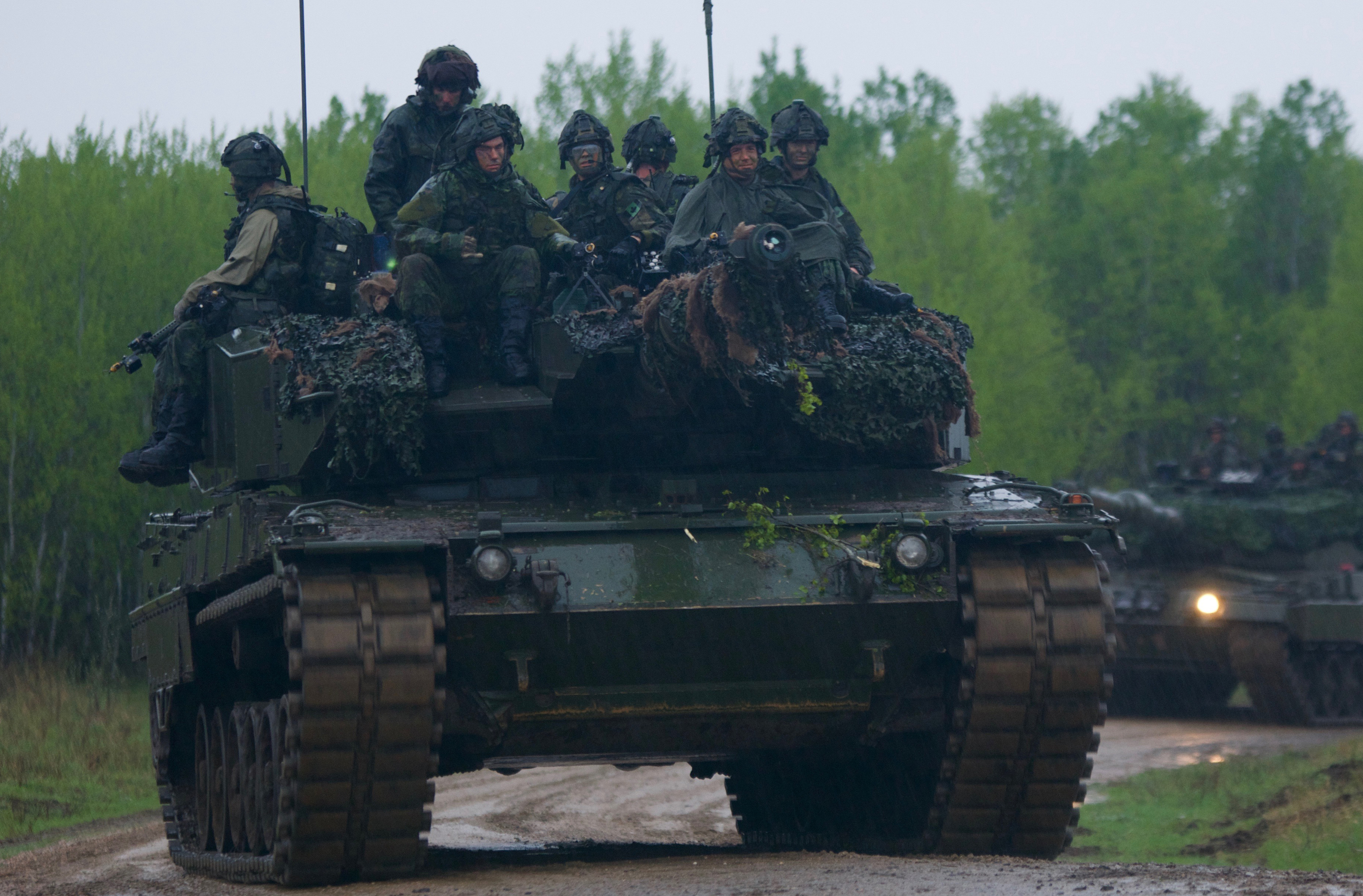
Soldiers from 2 Canadian Mechanized Brigade Group sit atop a Leopard 2A4 tank, 2017

Headquartered at Canadian Forces Base Edmonton, the 1st Canadian Division serves as the Army's high readiness manoeuvre division, responsible for building and maintaining a force capable of conducting a full spectrum of combat roles, including expeditionary warfare.

The division includes three mechanized brigade groups that operate tanks, armoured vehicles and reconnaissance platforms, 1 Canadian Mechanized Brigade Group, 2 Canadian Mechanized Brigade Group, and 5 Canadian Mechanized Brigade Group. The mechanized brigade groups are commanded by a colonel and consists of Regular Force personnel. Each mechanized brigade group includes two mechanized battalions, a support battalion, and regiments and units from the Royal Canadian Armoured Corps, Canadian Military Engineers, Royal Regiment of Canadian Artillery, and Communications and Electronics Branch.

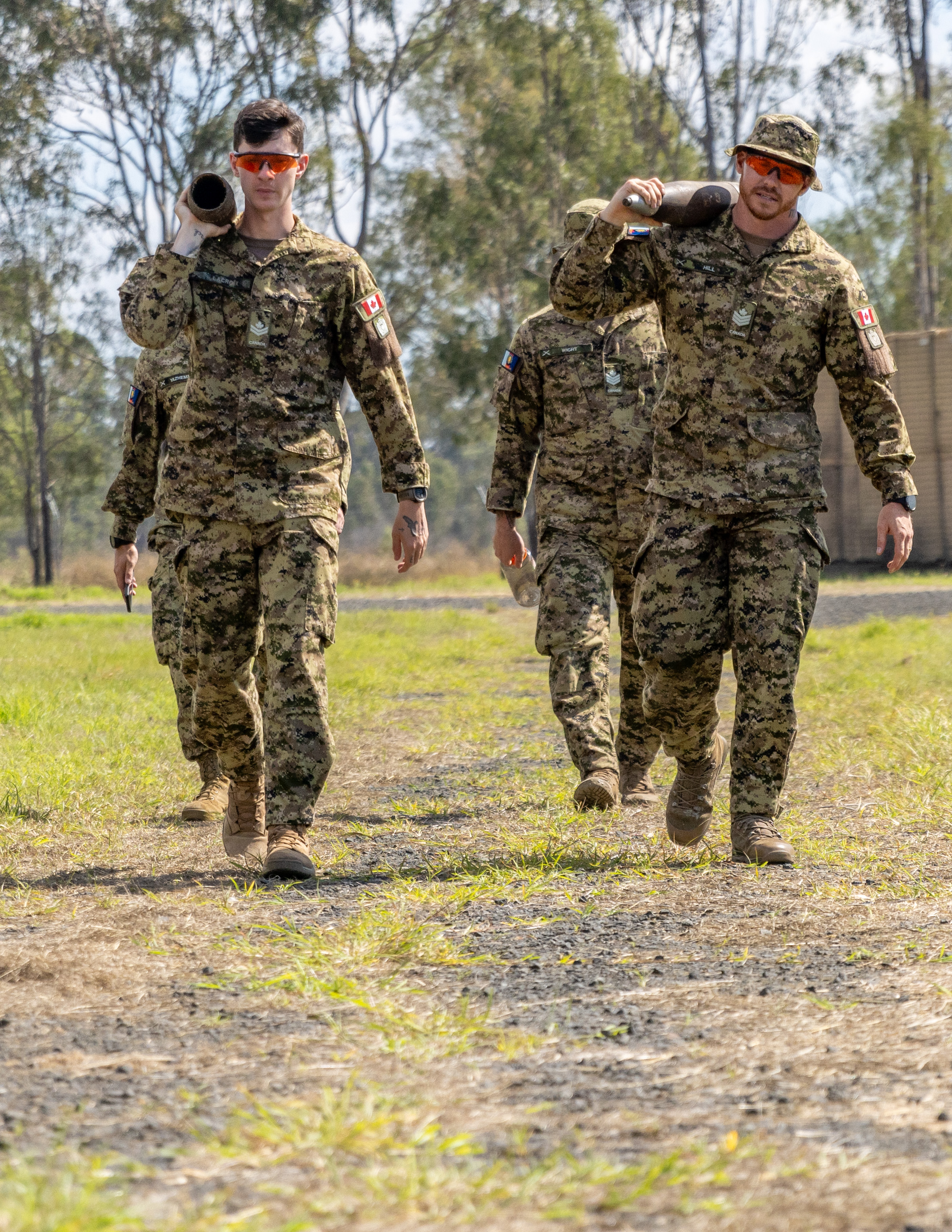
Soldiers of 6th Canadian Combat Support Brigade carrying simulated ordnances

Other formations in the division include 1st Canadian Artillery Brigade, responsible for coordinating artillery; 1st Canadian Sustainment Brigade, responsible for logistics and combat service support; 3rd Canadian Light Infantry Regiment, responsible for the division's light infantry forces; 6th Canadian Combat Support Brigade, responsible for air defence, combat engineering, electronic warfare, CBRN defence, psychological operations, and uncrewed systems; and 10th Signal Regiment, responsible for communications across the division.

==== 2nd Canadian Division ====
Headquartered in Montreal, the 2nd Canadian Division is the Army's component responsible for the "defence of Canada" and leads Canadian joint domestic operations south of the 60th parallel. It integrates personnel from the Regular and Reserve forces and maintains a national network that responds to domestic emergencies, contingency operations, and threats to Canadian territory and critical infrastructure.

Its formations includes several regional brigade groups that help augment the CAF's expeditionary operations, and maintain readiness to respond to natural disasters and other domestic emergencies within their regions; while the Canadian Ranger Group provides Arctic surveillance and community liaison operations in the Arctic.

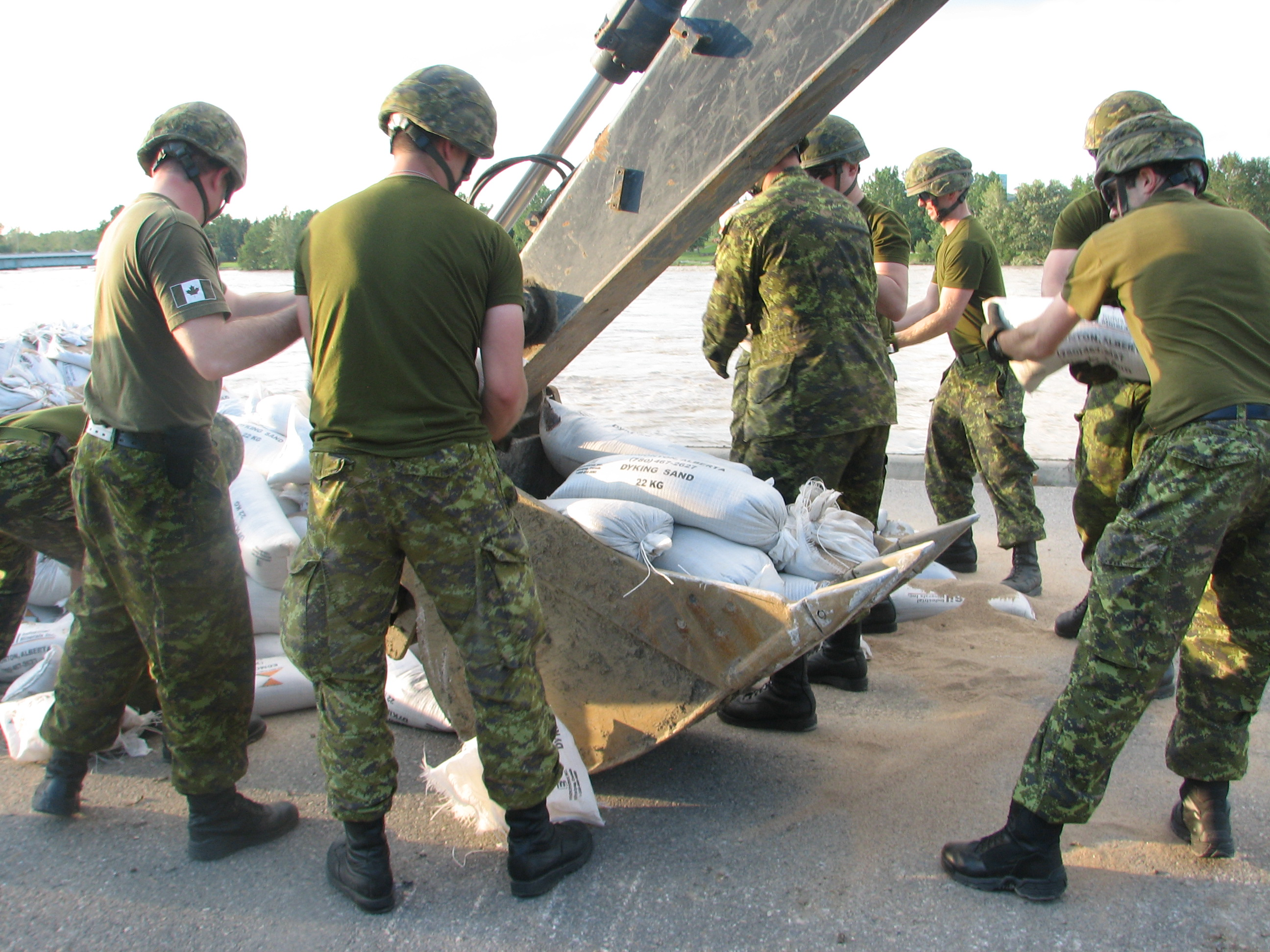
Soldiers from the Calgary Highlanders, a unit of 41 Canadian Brigade Group, assist with flood mitigation during the 2013 Alberta floods.

Formations within the division include:

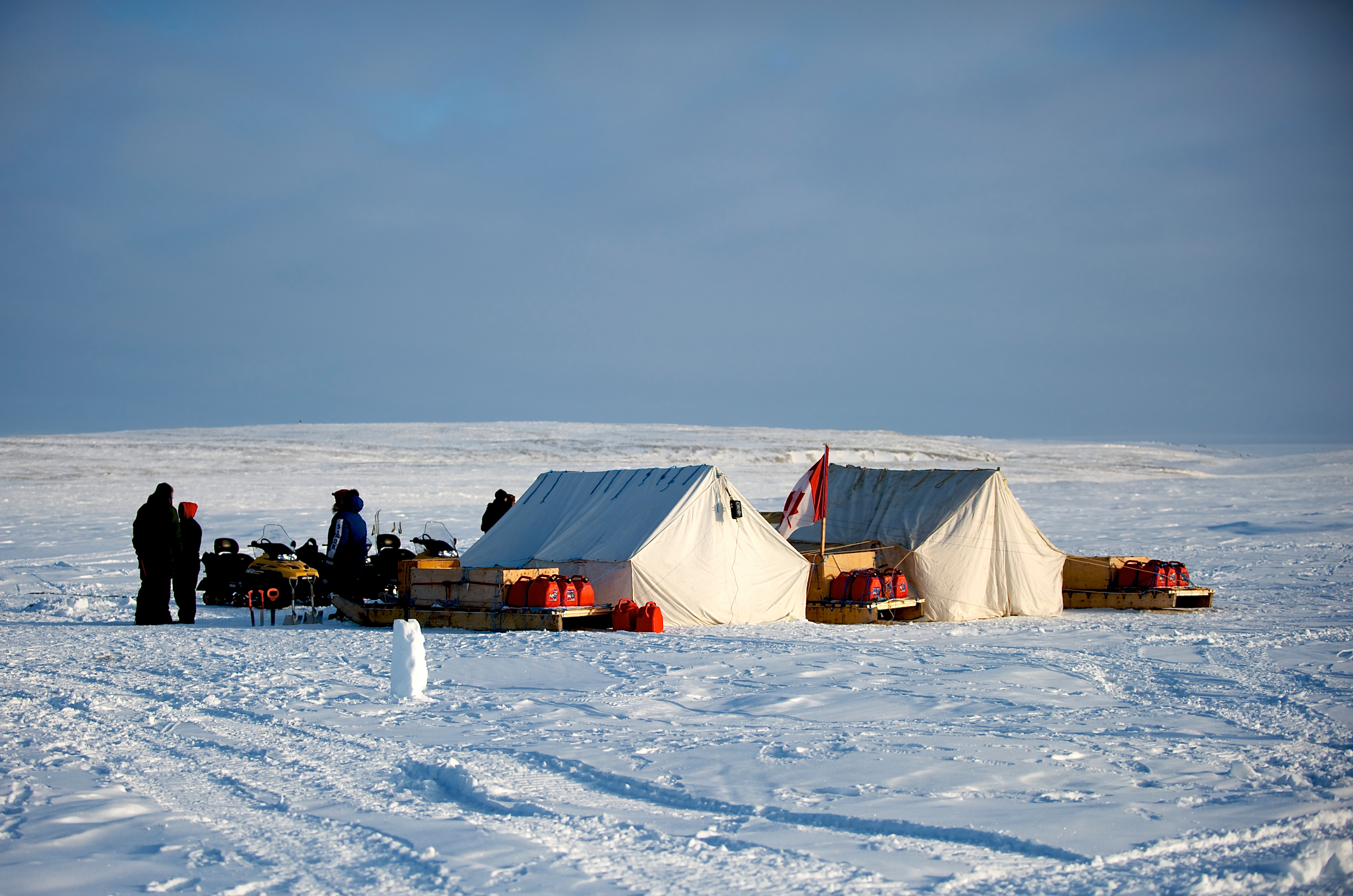
Canadian Rangers training camp in Alert, Nunavut

- 2nd Military Intelligence Battalion
- 31 Canadian Brigade Group (made up of 13 units based in southwestern Ontario)
- 32 Canadian Brigade Group (made up of 14 units based in Ontario's Greater Golden Horseshoe)
- 33 Canadian Brigade Group (made up of 16 units based in eastern Ontario, and parts of central and northeastern Ontario)
- 34 Canadian Brigade Group (made up of 15 units based in western Quebec)
- 35 Canadian Brigade Group (made up of 12 units based in eastern Quebec)
- 36 Canadian Brigade Group (made up of 11 units based in Nova Scotia and Prince Edward Island)
- 37 Canadian Brigade Group (made up of 9 units based in New Brunswick and the island of Newfoundland)
- 38 Canadian Brigade Group (made up of 13 units based in Manitoba, Saskatchewan, and northwestern Ontario)
- 39 Canadian Brigade Group (made up of 11 units based in British Columbia)
- 41 Canadian Brigade Group (made up of 9 units based in Alberta and the Northwest Territories)
- Canadian Rangers Group (made up of 5 patrol groups based in northern Canada and seven Canadian provinces)

==== Support Division ====
Based in Kingston, Ontario, the Canadian Army Support Division provides the infrastructure, services, and technical support for Army operations. The division provides unified command of bases, garrisons, and detachments, and standardizes command and control across support units.

The division operates four geographically-based Canadian Support Groups: Atlantic, Central, East and West. Support units responsibilities include technical services, equipment maintenance, sustainment, training and education, as well as infrastructure development intended to support future Army growth and modernization.

==== Canadian Army Doctrine and Training Centre ====
The Canadian Army Doctrine and Training Centre is responsible for the development of doctrine, manages the Army's intellectual growth, and oversees all individual and collective training across its establishments and divisions. Headquartered in Kingston, Ontario, CADTC oversees land operations training delivered at its training centres, staff colleges, and across the Army's divisions.

CADTC is also responsible for the development of doctrine. Advanced and future war doctrine is developed at the Canadian Army Land Warfare Centre (CALWC), which also publishes the peer-reviewed Canadian Army Journal.

== Personnel ==
As of 2024, the Canadian Army included 22,500 full-time soldiers in the Regular Force. In the same year the Reserve Force had 21,500 part-time soldiers, including 5,300 Canadian Rangers. In addition to commissioned and non-commissioned members, the Army employs 3,500 civilian personnel to support its operations.

=== Rank and insignia ===
Military ranks in the Canadian Army denote an individual's position within the Army's hierarchy. Advancement through the ranks corresponds to increased responsibility and authority. The rank structure is used to facilitate the transmission of orders during operations, ensure clarity of command, and maintain discipline and order.

==== Commander-in-Chief ====
Board

Sleeve

Commander-in-Chief board and sleeve used by the governor general of Canada when wearing an army uniform.

In their capacity as the Commander-in-Chief of Canada, the governor general of Canada is entitled to wear a distinctive general officer uniform from any of three environments: navy, army, or air force. The army uniform features a unique general sleeve braid embellished with the governor general's badge. The badge is also embroidered on the uniform's shoulder straps.

==== Officers ====
Army officers hold positions of command and responsibility. Their roles typically include overseeing personnel, planning, and directing operations, making decisions within their scope of authority, and providing advice to achieve operational objectives.

The rank insignia for Army general officers, like those of other Canadian Armed Forces general and flag officers, features maple leaves, the number of which corresponds to the officer's rank. The rank insignia for senior officers generally consists of a combination of pips and St. Edward's Crown, although the insignia for majors only includes the crown. The insignia for junior and subordinate officers/officer cadets consists solely of pips, with the number corresponding to the officer's rank.

Foot guards use alternate titles for some ranks for traditional reasons, with second lieutenants styled as ensigns.

NATO code	OF-10	OF-9	OF-8	OF-7	OF-6	OF-5	OF-4	OF-3	OF-2	OF-1
Canadian Army
Canadian Army		General	Lieutenant-general	Major-general	Brigadier-general	Colonel	Lieutenant-colonel	Major	Captain	Lieutenant	Second lieutenant
Canadian Army		Général(e)	Lieutenant(e)-général(e)	Major(e)-général(e)	Brigadier(ère)-général(e)	Colonel(le)	Lieutenant(e)-colonel(le)	Major(e)	Capitaine	Lieutenant(e)	Sous-lieutenant(e)

==== Non-commissioned members ====
Non-commissioned members in the Army perform operational and support duties and contribute to maintaining safety, discipline, and the welfare of their units.

Some Army units use alternative titles for the rank of private for regimental or historical reasons. This includes certain infantry units, with guardsman used by foot guards, fusilier by fusilier regiments, and rifleman or voltigeur by rifle regiments. Armoured units use the title trooper, artillery units use gunner, the Canadian Rangers uses ranger, Canadian Military Engineers use sapper, the Corps of Royal Canadian Electrical and Mechanical Engineers uses craftsman, and the Royal Canadian Corps of Signals uses signaller. The lowest rank in Canadian military bands is referred to as musician, piper, or drummer, depending on the type of band and instrument played.

Other alternative rank used by Army units includes bombardier and master bombardier for corporal and master corporal in Royal Canadian Artillery units, and colour sergeant for warrant officers in regiments of foot guards.

NATO code	OR-9	OR-8	OR-7	OR-6	OR-5	OR-4	OR-3	OR-2	OR-1
Canadian Army									No insignia
Canadian Army	Chief warrant officer	Master warrant officer	Warrant officer	Sergeant		Master corporal	Corporal	Private (trained)	Private (basic)
Canadian Army	Adjudant(e)-chef	Adjudant(e)-maître	Adjudant(e)	Sergent(e)		Caporal(e)-chef	Caporal(e)	Soldat(e) (formé(e))	Soldat(e) (confirmé(e))

In addition to rank insignias, non-commissioned members appointed as the Canadian Forces Chief Warrant Officer, Command Chief Warrant Officer, or Senior Appointment Chief Warrant Officer wear distinct insignias to denote the senior appointment. Leaders of military bands, such as drum, pipe, and trumpet/bugle majors, also wear distinctive insignia denoting their appointments.

=== Training ===
Newly enrolled non-commissioned members of the Army undergo foundational training through Basic Military Qualification (BMQ), while newly enrolled officers go through Basic Military Officer Qualification (BMOQ). Both BMQ and BMOQ take place at Canadian Forces Leadership and Recruit School.

==== Officer entry plans ====
The Canadian Army commissions officers through multiple entry plans, each designed for candidates with different educational backgrounds and levels of military experience, to develop them to the required standard of proficiency expected of an officer. This typically includes providing pathways to complete an academic degree. However, individuals who already possess an academic degree or technology diploma may qualify for the Direct Entry Officer Plan, which serves as a direct pathway to commissioning.

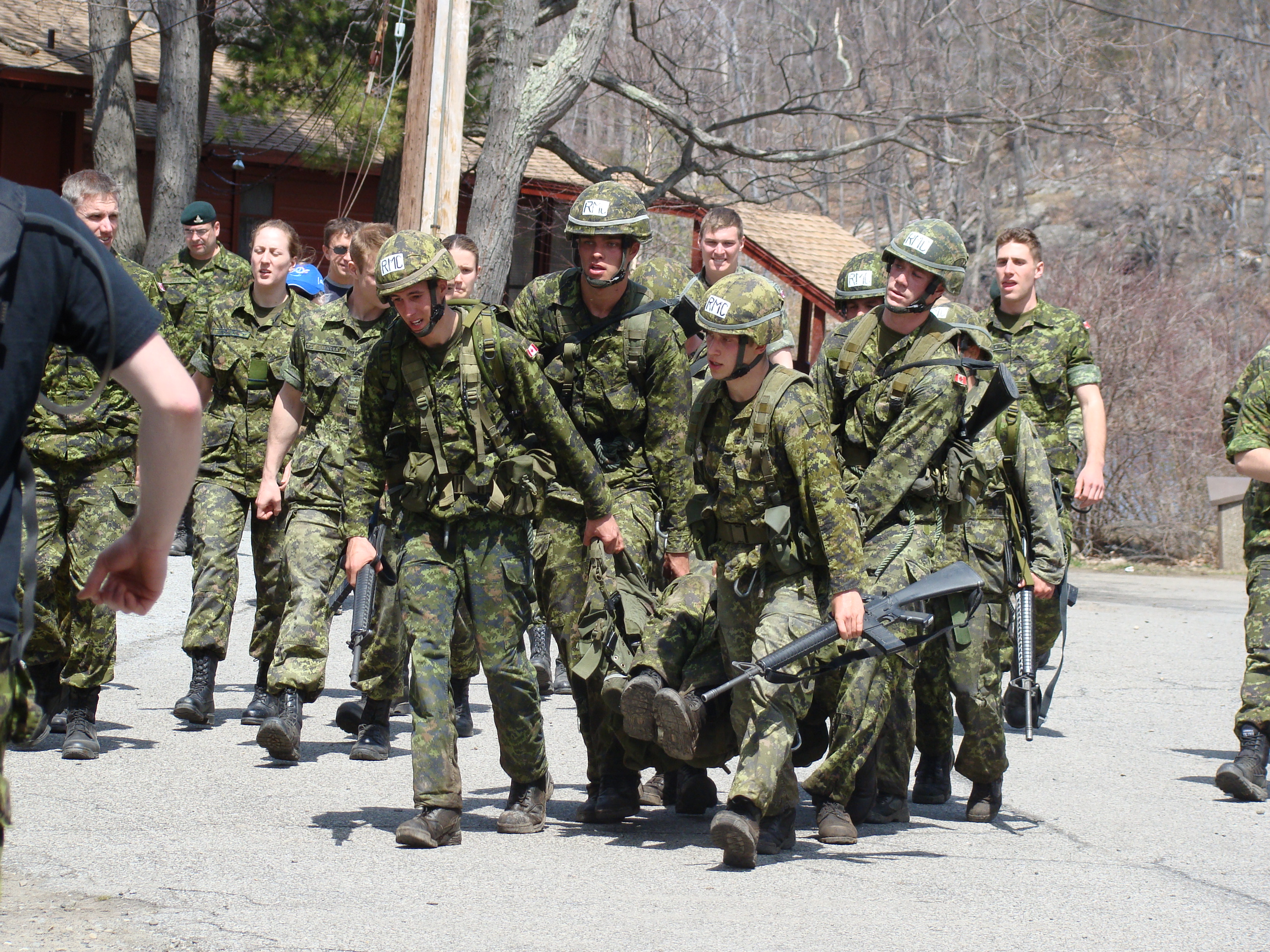
Officer cadets of the Royal Military College of Canada during the 2009 Sandhurst Competition

Several entry plans offer paid or subsidized education in exchange for military service. The Regular Officer Training Plan involves earning an academic degree at the Royal Military College of Canada (RMC), the Royal Military College Saint-Jean (RMC Saint-Jean), or a civilian Canadian university. Due to shortages in specific officer occupations, the Continuing Education Officer Training Plan (CEOTP) was created for select candidates who are otherwise qualified for service as officers but lack an academic degree, allowing them to enter the Army and complete their degree while serving.

Several entry plans facilitate the transition of serving non-commissioned members to officers. The University Training Plan for Non-Commissioned Members allows serving members to earn a degree at RMC, RMC Saint-Jean, or a civilian Canadian university in preparation to become officers. The Commissioning from the Ranks Plan commissions experienced candidates who demonstrate officer potential, supplementing other commissioning routes. The Special Requirements Commissioning Plan leverages the skills of senior non-commissioned members, such as Chief Warrant Officers, and provides them a route to commissioning.

==== Occupational training ====
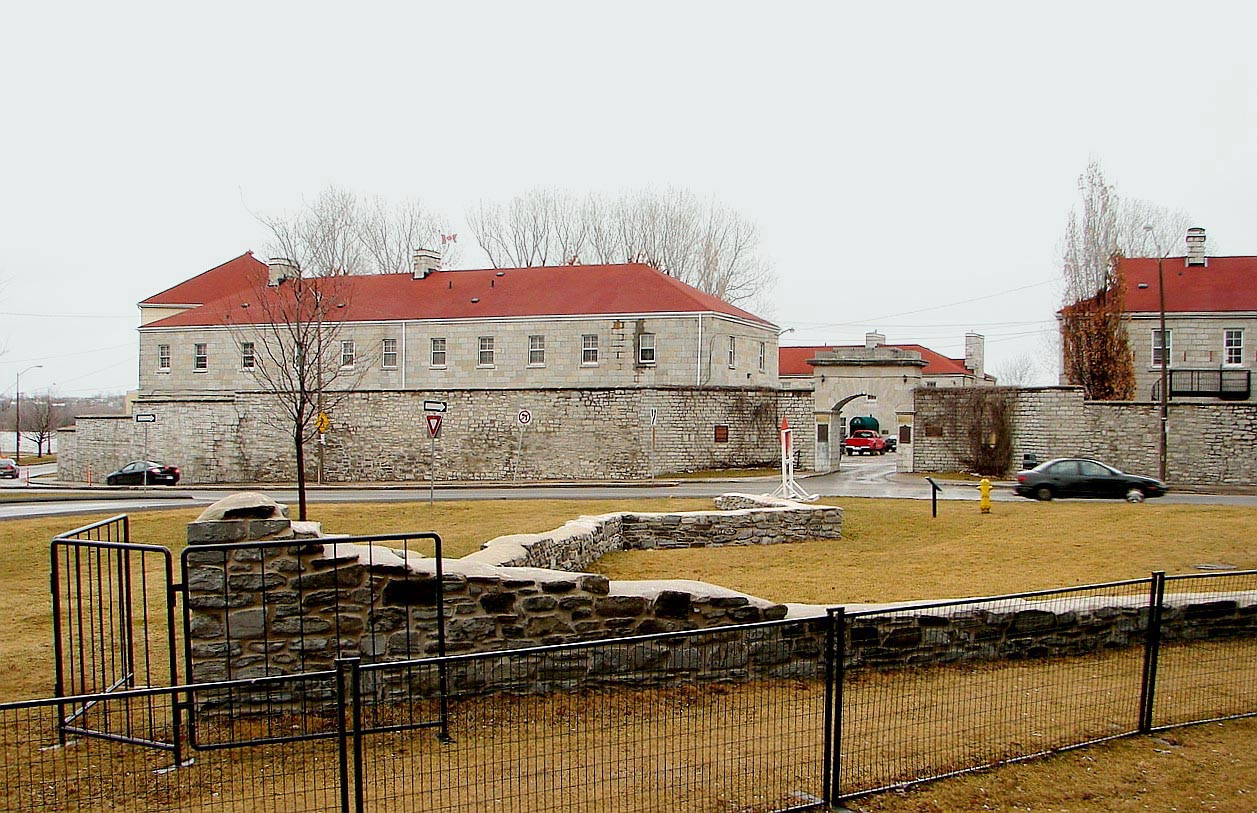
Exterior of Fort Frontenac, home of the Canadian Army Command and Staff College

The Canadian Army Doctrine and Training Centre oversees the Army's training organizations and establishments, like the Canadian Manoeuvre Training Centre, Peace Support Training Centre and the Canadian Army Command and Staff College. Schools operated by CADTC include through the Combat Training Centre (CTC), including Canadian Army Advanced Warfare Centre and the Tactics School.

Several unified Canadian Armed Forces schools are also accessible to Army personnel, including the Canadian Forces College and the CTC's Canadian Forces School of Military Engineering. The latter institution was formerly an army run institution until 1968, when its mandate was expanded to meet the needs of the Navy and Air Force.

=== Uniforms ===
Uniforms worn by the Canadian Army are regulated by the Dress Instructions for the Canadian Forces. Misuse of the likeness of Canadian Army uniforms is an offence under Article 419 of the Criminal Code of Canada and is punishable by summary conviction.

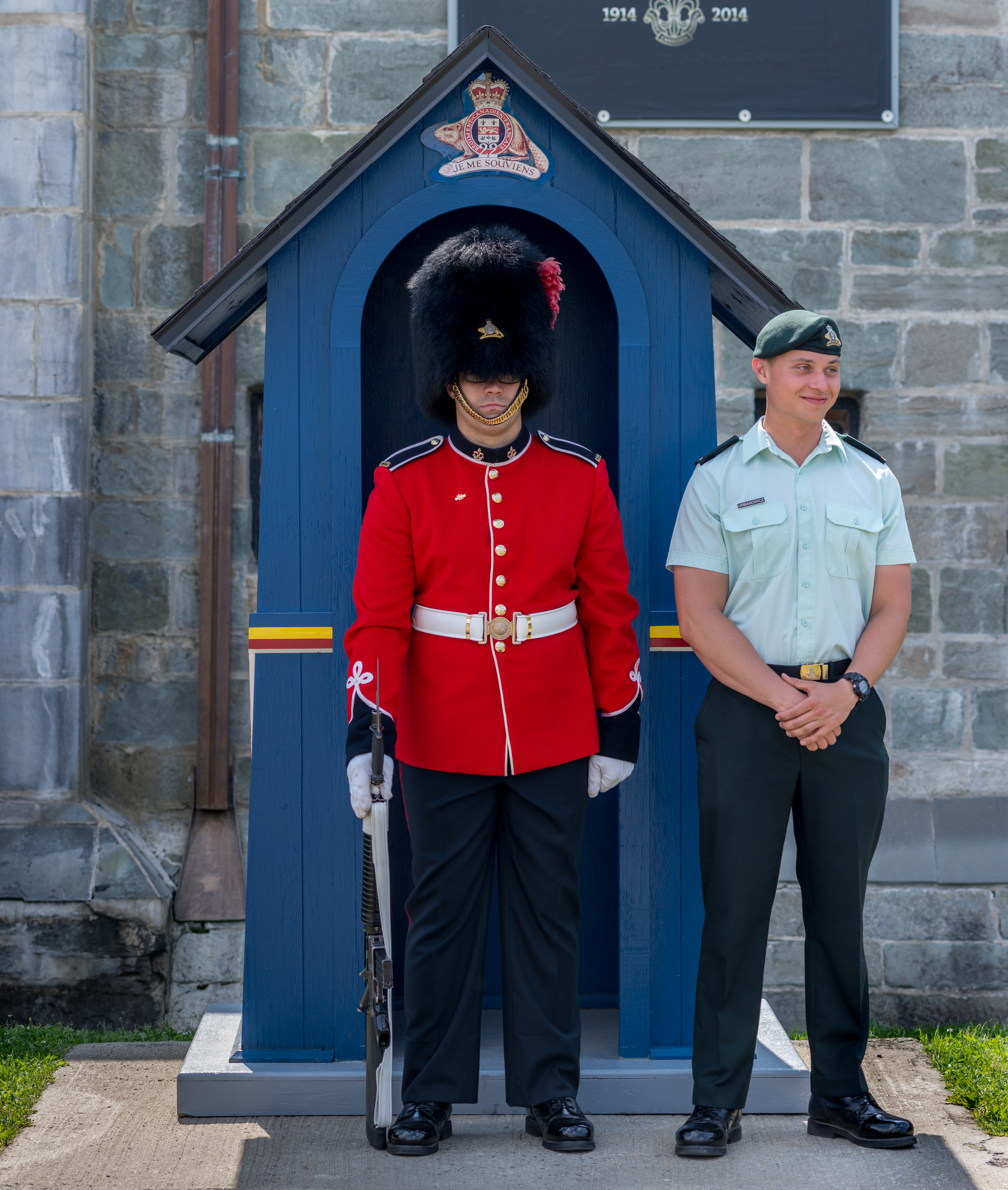
A Royal 22nd Regiment soldier in No. 1B ceremonial full dress alongside another in No. 3B service dress, 2018

Uniforms of the Canadian Armed Forces, including the Army, are categorized into five types, including No. 1 Dress (ceremonial dress), No. 2 Dress (mess dress), No. 3 Dress (service dress), No. 4 Dress (occupational dress), and No. 5 Dress (operational dress). Each category contains several orders that specify variations for particular occasions.

==== Daily duty and operational attire ====
No. 3 Dress is the Canadian Army's service dress uniform worn for daily duties and travel. It includes a beret, necktie, service jacket, and trousers in Army environmental colours, paired with black leather shoes. Variations include No. 3A, a long-sleeved version, and No. 3B, a short-sleeved version.

No. 5 Operational Dress consists of uniforms worn during operations, operational training, or as directed. These include field combat clothing featuring CADPAT digital camouflage, as well as aviation and naval combat dress. Operational uniforms are used across the entire Canadian Armed Forces and are not specific to any single environmental command.

==== Formal attire ====
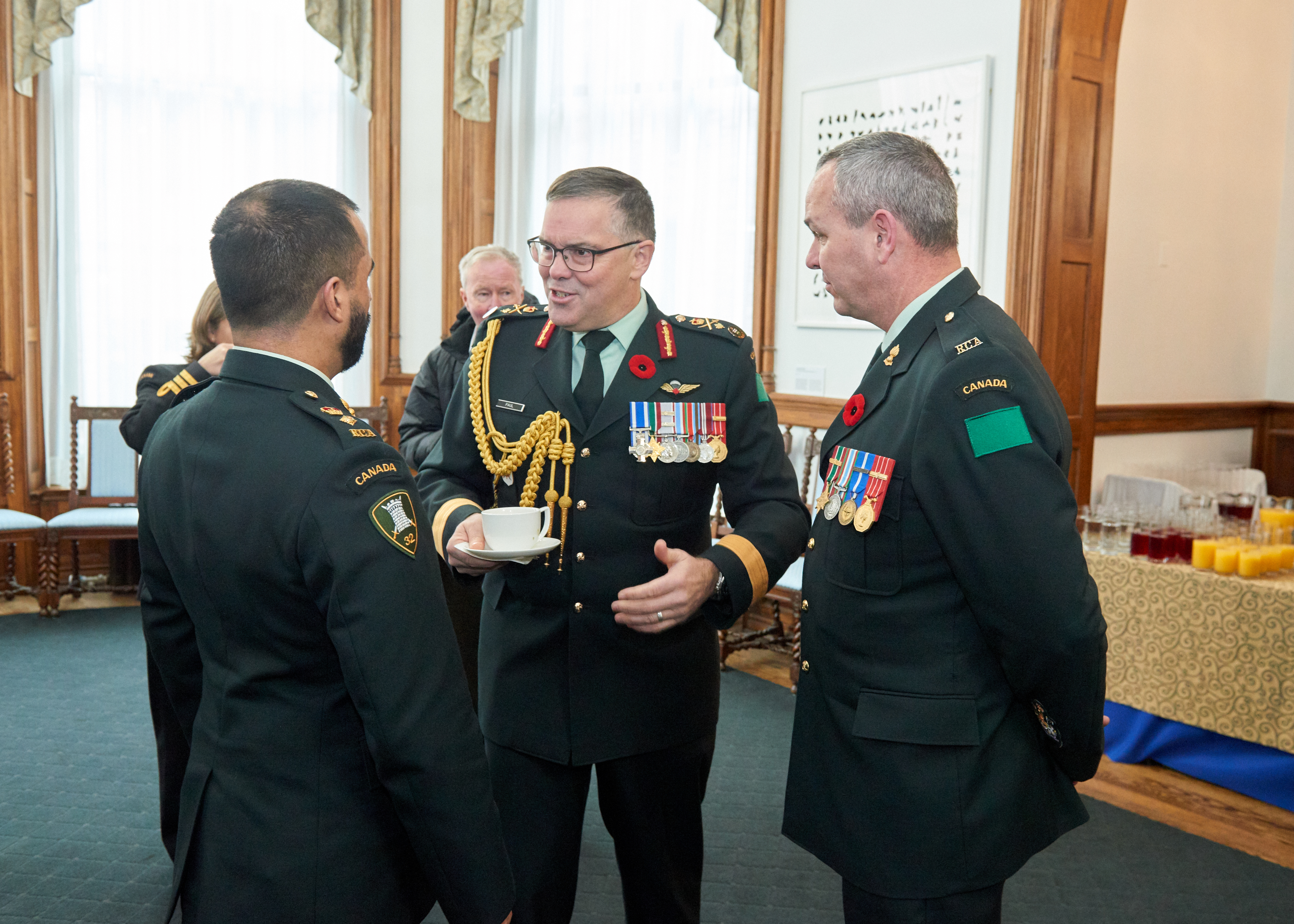
Officers in No. 1 Dress, the Army's ceremonial service dress, with a remembrance poppy on their lapels

No. 1 Dress includes uniforms for formal occasions, and whose appearance reflect the heritage of the unit. The Army's service dress uniforms may also be used for formal occasions, with No. 1 Dress outlining its use when worn with medals and accoutrements, and No. 1A Dress outlining its use when worn with medals only.

The Army's universal full dress uniform, No. 1B Dress, is the Army's most formal attire and includes a white Wolseley helmet, a red coat, and royal blue trousers. Most units are authorized some minor regimental differences to reflect the unit's history, although some units are authorized significant differences from the universal full dress. This includes changes to the headdress for artillery, hussar, horse guards, rifle, and kilted Irish and Canadian-Scottish regiments, as well as changes to the colour of the tunic or doublet. Unlike other uniforms in the CAF, which are issued, full dress uniforms are generally purchased by the service member, except for officer cadets at Canadian military colleges and volunteers to the Ceremonial Guard, for whom they are provided.

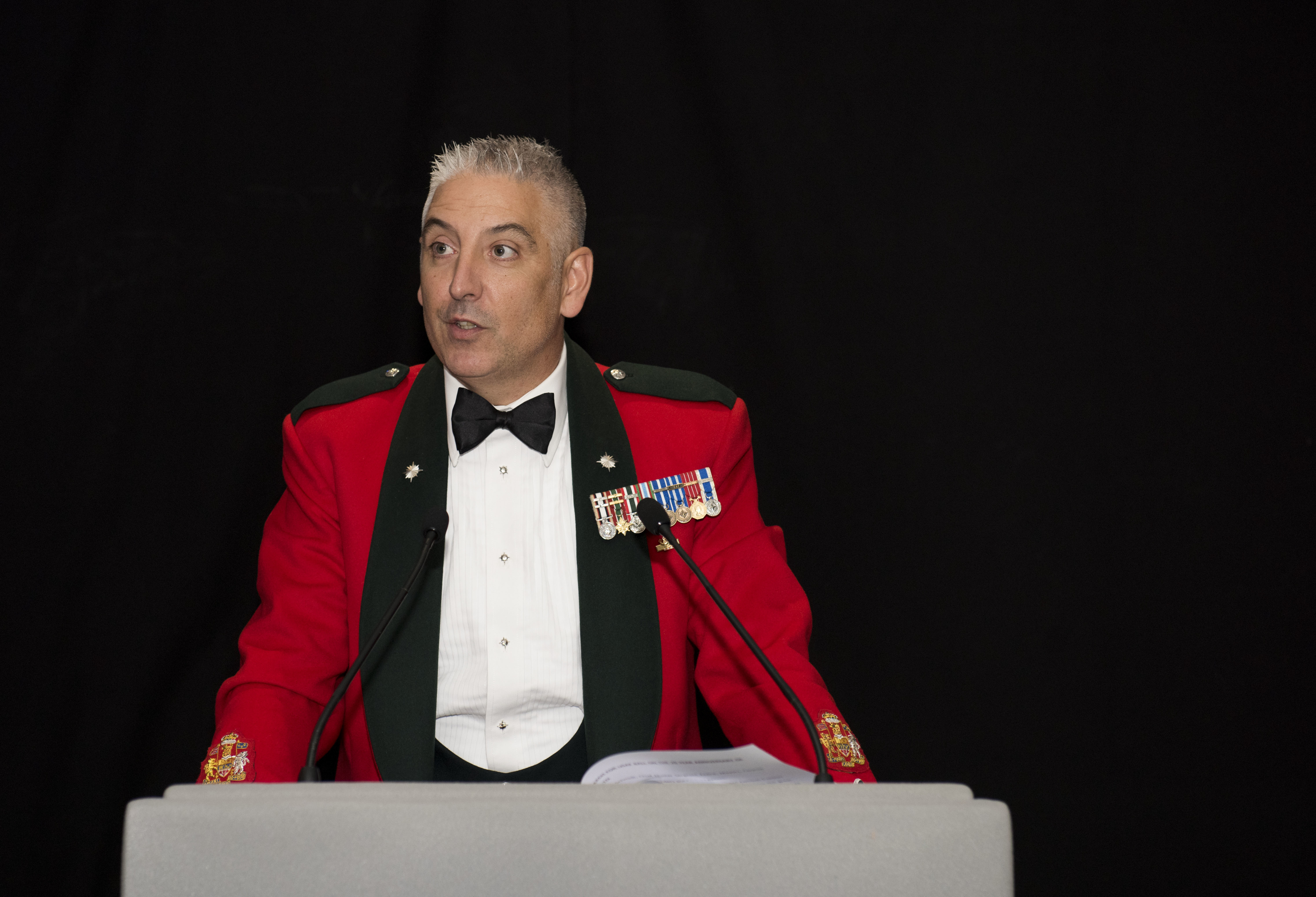
A Canadian Army chief warrant officer in No. 2 mess dress during a formal ball

No. 2 Dress is a uniform worn for military dinners and other formal evening events. The standard pattern includes a red mess jacket, blue waistcoat, and either trousers or a kilt. Similar to full dress uniforms, several Army units have authorized regimental variations to their mess dress.

== Equipment ==
=== Vehicles ===
==== Armoured ====
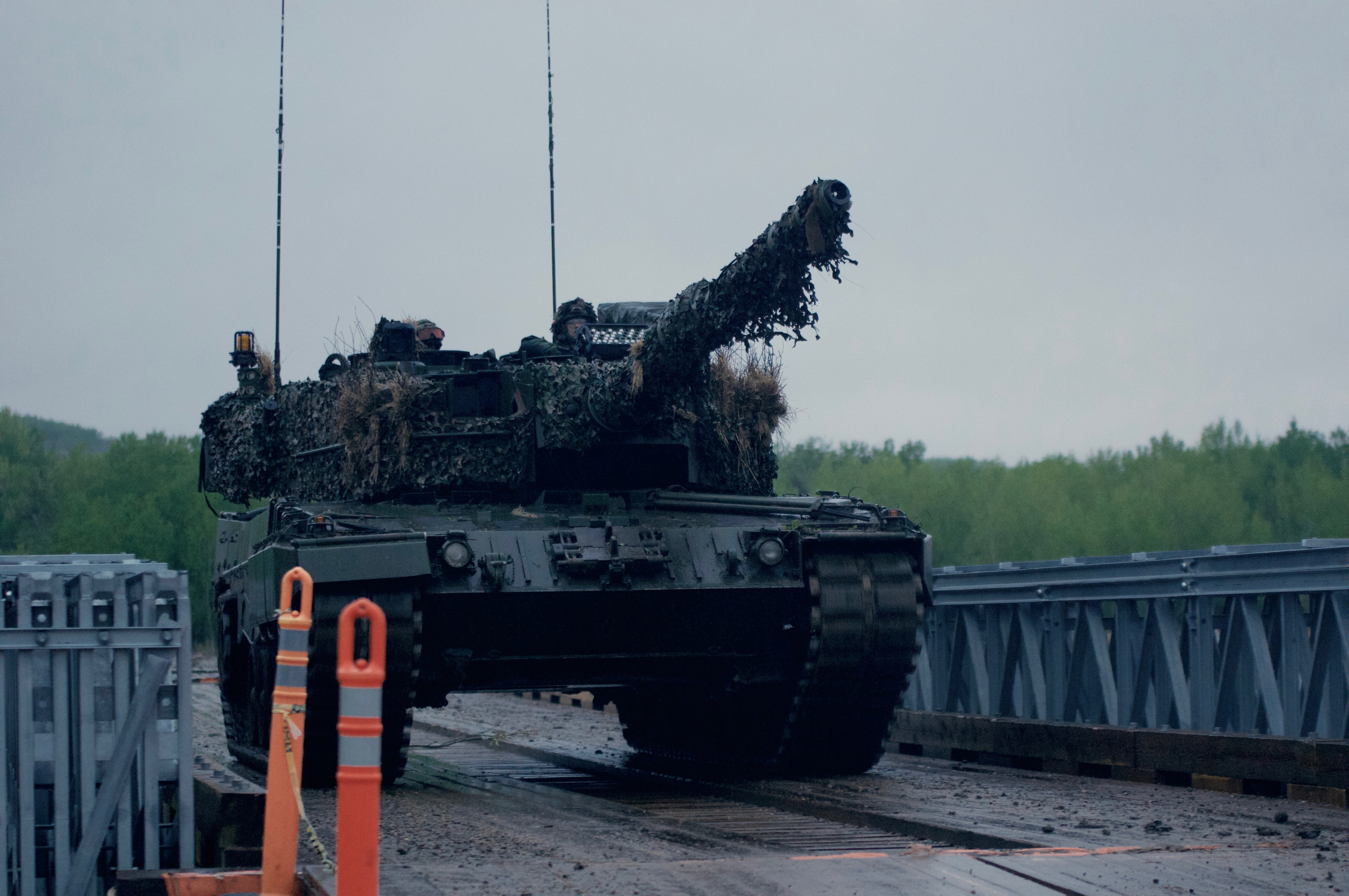
A Leopard 2A4 during a military exercise at CFB Wainwright, 2017

The Canadian Army operates a variety of armoured vehicles including the Leopard 2 series main battle tank, which includes variants such as the Leopard 2A4, 2A4M, 2A6M. These tanks are primarily deployed to provide direct fire support. They are supported by LAV 6 infantry fighting vehicles, which offer enhanced fire support, protection, and mobility for infantry.

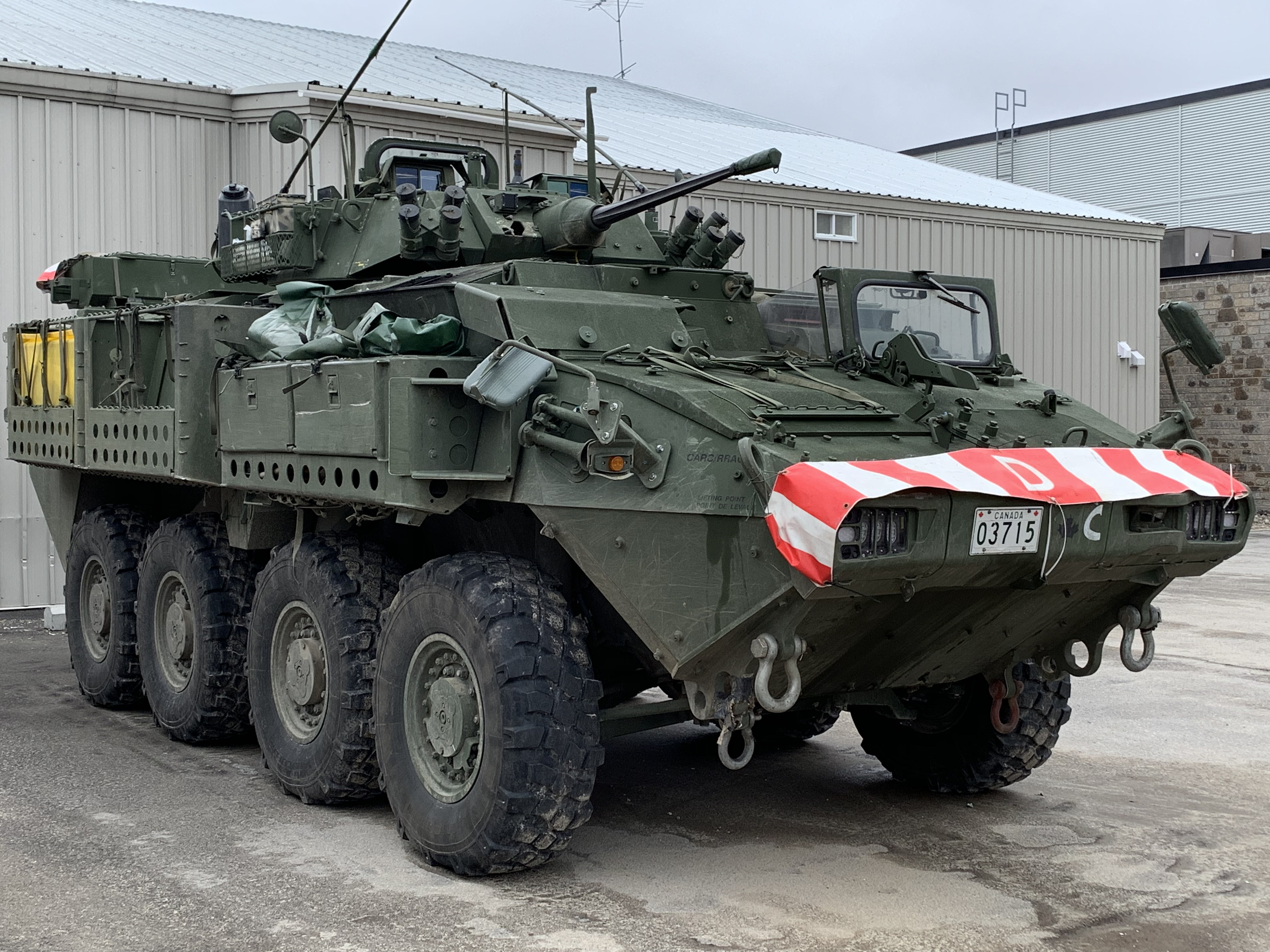
A LAV 6 infantry fighting vehicle in Saint-André-Avellin, Quebec, 2019

Armoured reconnaissance and command and control vehicles in use include the Coyote armoured vehicle and the Textron tactical armoured patrol vehicle. Armoured support vehicles in use include the Armoured Combat Support Vehicle and the Leopard 2ARV and 2AEV variants, the latter two used for armoured recovery and engineering purposes.

The army also operates several specialized armoured vehicles for demining and route clearance, including the Buffalo, and Husky VMMD. For transport, route opening personnel utilize the Cougar mine-resistant ambush protected vehicle.

==== Utility and support ====
Utility vehicles the Canadian Army uses for personnel transport and logistics includes the amphibious Bandvagn 206 and the G Wagon - Light Utility Vehicle Wheeled. Support vehicles used by the Army include the Light Support Vehicle Wheeled, Medium Support Vehicle System, and the Heavy Logistics Vehicle Wheeled.

=== Weapons ===
The Canadian Army's standard issue weapon is the 5.56 mm Colt Canada C7 and C8 rifles, while the C22 pistol is the standard sidearm. The C7A2 serves as the standard personal assault rifle, while the C8A3 carbine is used when space constraints limit the use of the C7A2.

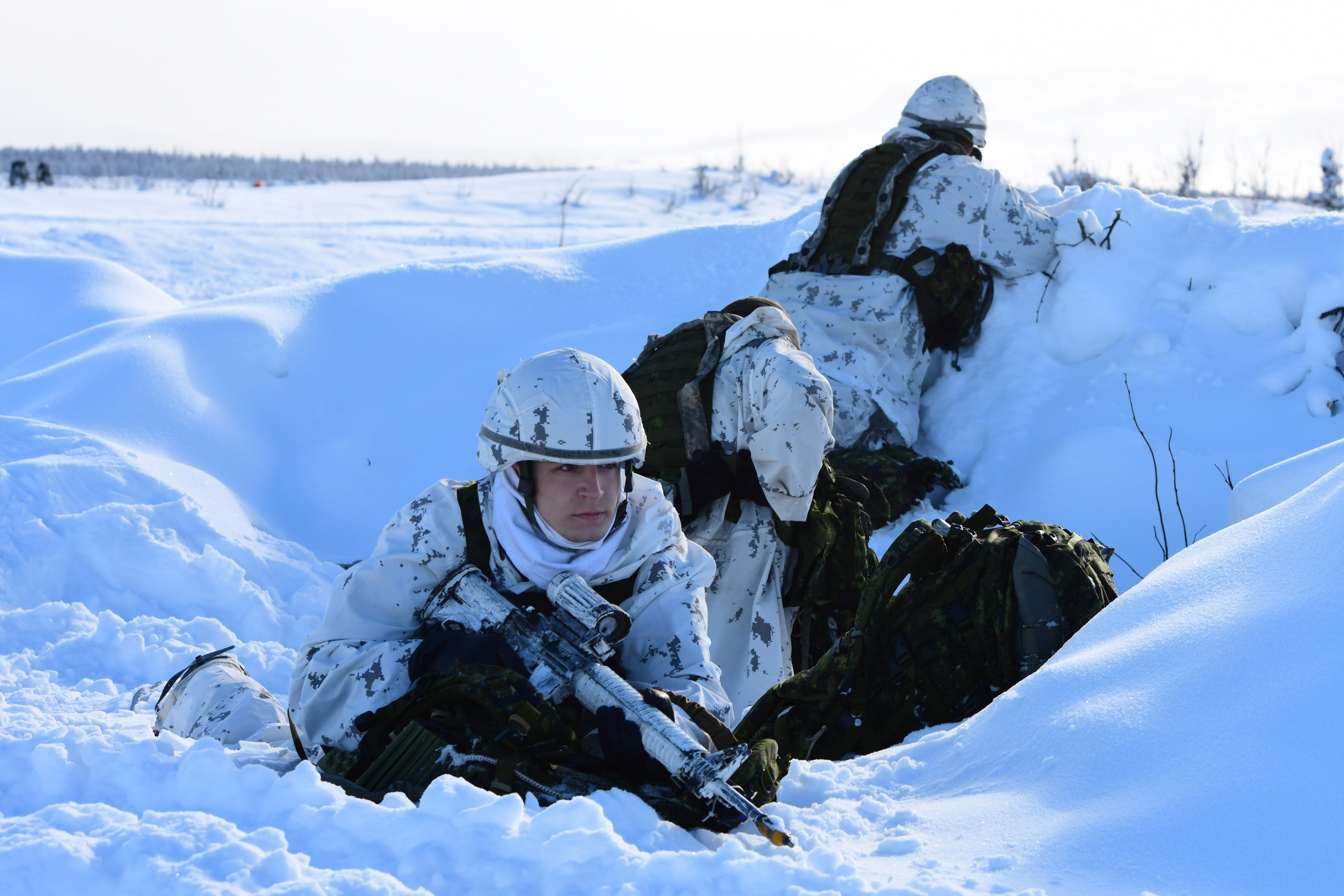
Canadian Army soldiers equipped with C7A2 rifles set up a defensive perimeter, 2022

The .50 calibre C15A2 is the designated long-range sniper weapon of the Canadian Army, while the Colt Canada C20 DMR is the designated marksman rifle. Weapons used to provide support and sustained fire include the C9A2 light machine gun, C6A1 general-purpose machine gun, and the M2HB heavy machine gun. Other weapons used by Canadian soldiers include the 81mm mortar for indirect fire and the M72 LAW anti-tank weapon.

The Canadian Army has two artillery systems, the C3 105mm howitzer and the M777 155mm howitzer. The former provides close fire support while the latter system can provide fire support as far as 40 kilometres (25 mi). The M777 howitzer is also able to be combined with the M982 Excalibur guided artillery shell, providing accurate fire up to 30 kilometres (19 mi) away.

== Bases and facilities ==
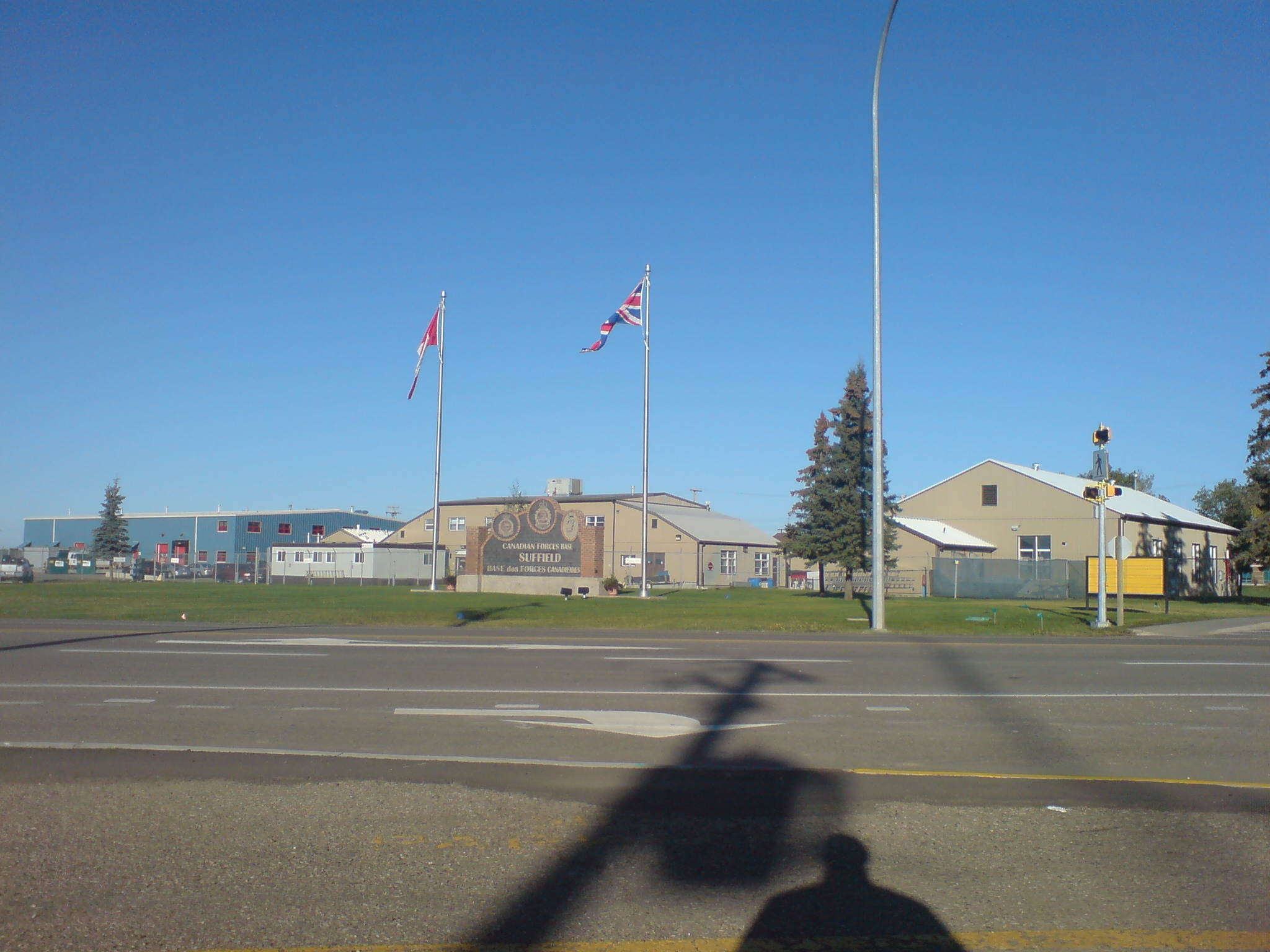
Entrance to CFB Suffield, the largest Canadian Forces base used by the Army

There are 10 Canadian Forces Bases that the Canadian Army uses to house brigade groups and regiments, as well as to provide training and support facilities for its personnel. This includes CFB Gagetown in New Brunswick, CFB Valcartier in Quebec, Garrison Petawawa, CFB Kingston and CFB Toronto in Ontario, CFB Shilo in Manitoba, and CFB Edmonton and CFB Suffield in Alberta. CFB Suffield is the largest Canadian Army base, hosting the Army's largest military training area, as well as the British Army Training Unit Suffield.

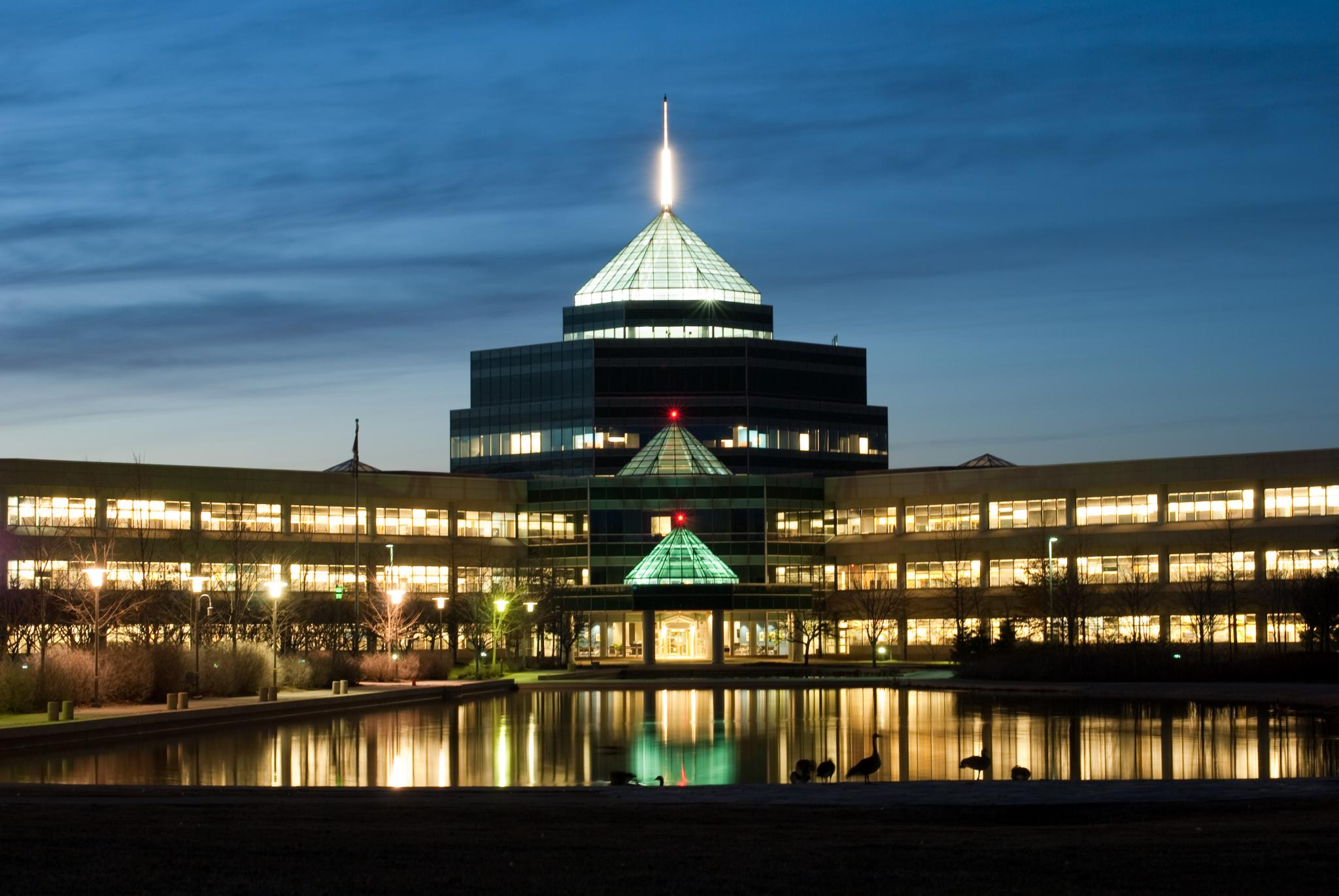
NDHQ Carling in Ottawa houses Canadian Army Headquarters

Alongside these 10 Canadian Forces Bases, the Canadian Army also operates several detachments and support bases, like 3rd Canadian Division Support Base Detachment Wainwright. Canadian Army Headquarters, the central administrative and command location for the Canadian Army, is at NDHQ Carling in Ottawa.

The Canadian Army Reserve maintains 169 armouries across Canada. Approximately 97 per cent of Canadians live within 45 minutes of a Canadian Army Reserve armoury.

== Symbols ==
=== Badges ===
The Canadian Army and its brigades, support groups, and regiments, all have distinct badges that serve as visual identifiersfor these commands and units. Badges of the Canadian Army are approved by the minister of National Defence, with any badges containing a Royal device, like a Crown, also requiring the authorization of the monarch or Governor-in-Council.

==== Canadian Army badge ====
The Canadian Army badge is made up of three conjoined maple leaves superimposed on crossed swords, surmounted by the Crown. The design, created by Archer Fortescue Duguid, was issued with approval on 7 April 1947. The crossed swords symbolize the Army's military history and its teamwork in defence of Canada. The three maple leaves are taken from the coat of arms of Canada, representing the heritage of the army and its service to the Canadian sovereign and country.

Prior to the adoption of a unique badge, the Army used the Canadian coat of arms as its badge. Discussions about a unique badge for the Army began as early as 1945, before Duguid's design was selected. Several Canadian Army Orders issued in subsequent years modified the design, like in 1953 when the crown was changed from the Tudor Crown to St Edward's Crown.

Following the 1968 unification of Canada's military branches into the CAF, the Army's badge was replaced by CAF emblems. A new insignia was approved for Force Mobile Command in 1967 anticipation of unification, featuring a red 11-point maple leaf on a white field over four blue arrowheads pointing to the cardinal directions, symbolizing national identity and mobility by land, sea, and air. The insignia was incorporated into the standardized heraldic frames for CAF commands following royal approval in September 1968, with its heraldic blazon published in 1976.

1993–2011

2011–2016

2016–2026

Former badges used by the Canadian Army

After Force Mobile Command was reorganized as Land Force Command, a new badge for the army was created, based on the original Canadian Army badge but with a single maple leaf instead of three conjoined leaves. During this reorganization, there was a proposal for Land Force Command Headquarters to readopt the original Canadian Army badge, however, it was not implemented.

Shortly after and Force Command was redesignated as the Canadian Army, it adopted a new badge that incorporated the original pre-unification Canadian Army badge into the CAF's heraldic frame. In 2016, the Army approved a new badge that revived the original 1947 design and removed the heraldic frame. In 2026, the Canadian Royal Crown replaced St Edward's Crown.

=== Flags ===
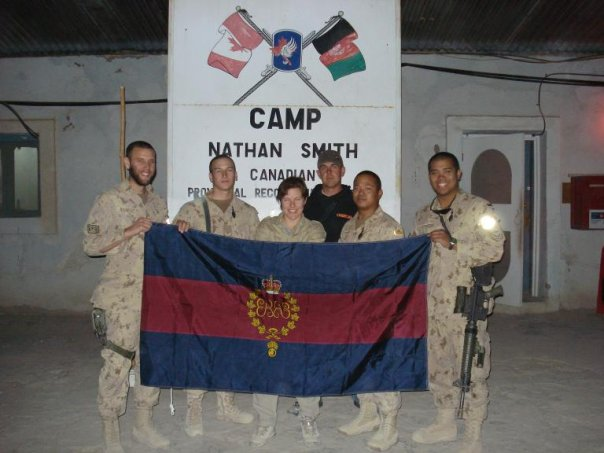
Canadian Grenadier Guards carry their regimental flag at Camp Nathan Smith in Afghanistan, 2008

The Canadian Army, and its regiments and service battalions have flags that serve as symbols and visuals identifiers for these units.

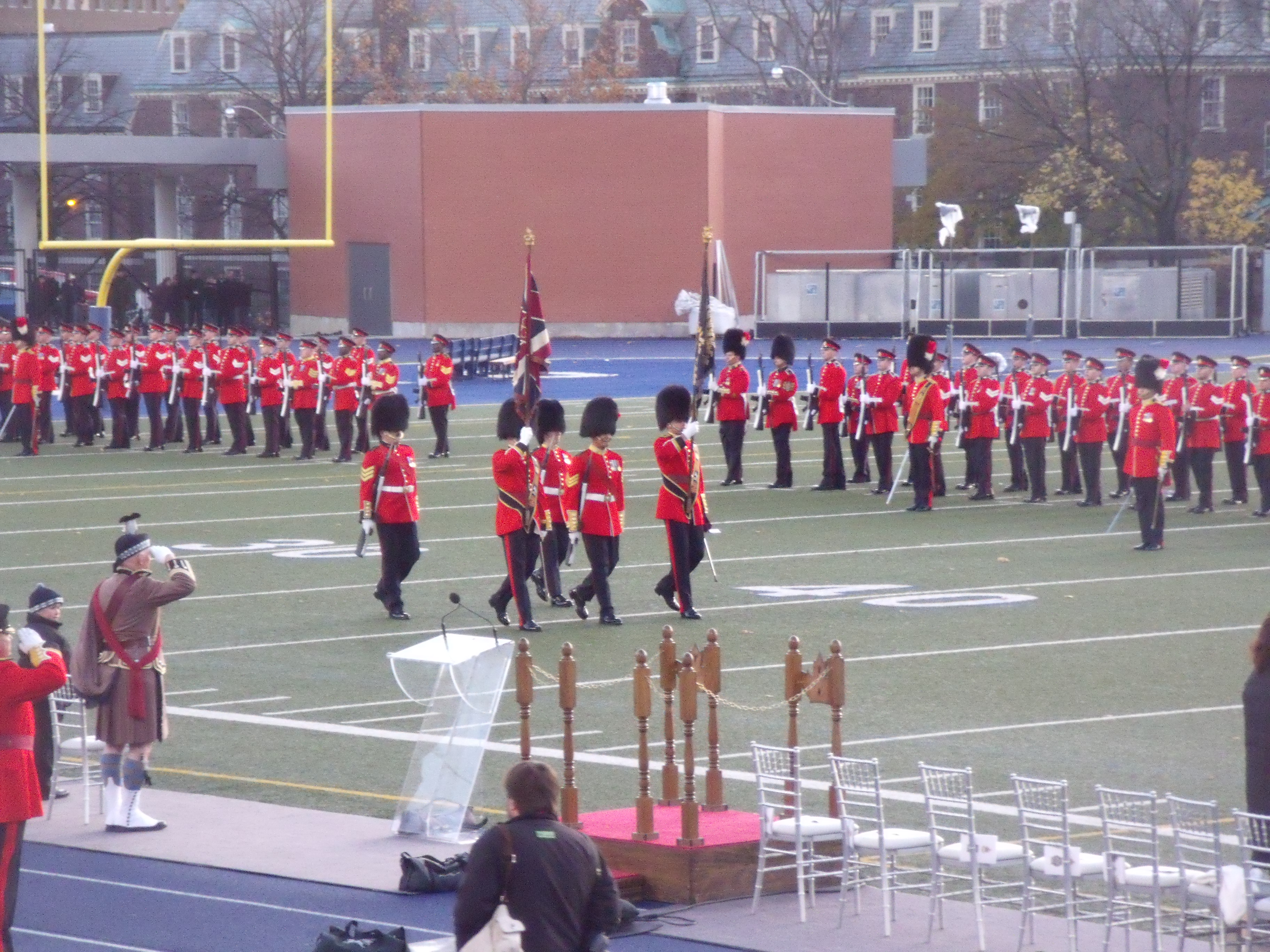
March-off of the Royal Regiment of Canada's old colours during the presentation of new colours, 2009

The Army's armoured and infantry regiments also possess consecrated flags known as colours, symbolizing the unit's honour, pride, and dedication to Canada and typically display battle honours to the unit.

==== Canadian Army flag ====
The Canadian Army has a CAF command flag, adopted in 2018. It includes a red field and is charged with a white maple leaf bearing the Canadian Army badge, and features the flag of Canada in the canton. Red is used as it is the Army's official colour, the white maple leaf is based on the emblem worn by Canadian soldiers during the First World War, while the national flag in the canton signifies its use as a CAF command flag.

=== Marches ===
The Canadian Army, along with its formations and units, have authorized marches distinct to their own organizations. The Great Little Army was adopted as the Army's official march in 2013, replacing Celer Paratus Callidus, which had been used since 1968. An army spokesperson noted that the previous march was neither "particularly tuneful nor easily recognizable," while the new march was "appropriate in both name and tune."

=== Mascot ===
The Army adopted an anthropomorphic bear as its military mascot to represent its personnel, with the name "Juno" selected through a public contest in 2003, honouring the Juno Beach landings of the Battle of Normandy. On Remembrance Day in 2015, the Army adopted a polar bear at the Toronto Zoo as its "live mascot", also naming her Juno and appointing her an honorary private. She was later promoted to honorary corporal on her first birthday and to honorary master corporal on her fifth.

== See also ==
- ABCANZ Armies
- Arctic Response Company Group
- Canadian Army Trophy
- Formation patches of the Canadian Army
- List of armies by country
- Regimental nicknames of the Canadian Forces
- Soldier Apprentice
