= Tactics School (Canada) =

Canadian Army Tactics School
- Badge of the Tactics School
- Country: Canada
- Branch: Canadian Army
- Type: Military Training Establishment
- Size: unit
- Garrison/HQ: CFB Gagetown
- Motto: Tactica
- Colors: Blue and White

The Canadian Army Tactics School supports the training and education of Army and other Canadian Armed Forces personnel by providing formal courses, learning support, and Counter-Improvised Explosive Devices and other Centre of Excellence expertise. The Tactics School is focussed on developing the Army's future leaders. Much of the school's curriculum revolves around command and employment of a combat team. The Tactics School also holds the Canadian Army Learning Support Centre which "was created to help the Army modernize its training methods [and] includes everything from hyper-realistic computer simulations to purpose-built models turned out using three dimensional printers". Unique amongst Canadian Army training establishments, the School has a high number of civilian contractors, employees, and interns.
