= Formation patches of the Canadian Army =

After the re-introduction of Formation Badges by the British Army in 1941, the Canadian Army followed suit. The 2nd Canadian Infantry Division used a "battle patch" system of geometric shapes identifying individual brigades and battalions, similar to that used by the 2nd Canadian Division in the First World War, during the 1941-42 period, but abandoned this system after the Dieppe Raid.

Other Canadian divisions used plain formation patches, and separate unit titles.".

First Canadian Army

I Canadian Corps

II Canadian Corps

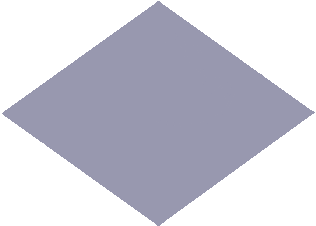
Atlantic Command (Canadian Army)

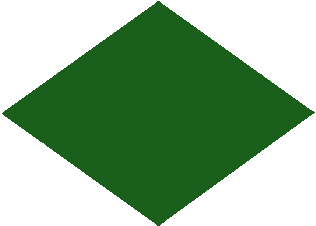
Pacific Command (Canadian Army)

1st Canadian Division

2nd Canadian Division
See also During World War II

3rd Canadian Division

4th Canadian Armoured Division

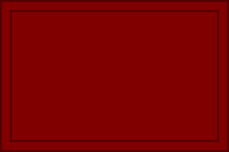
5th Canadian Armoured Division

6th Canadian Division (CAPF)

6th Canadian Division

7th Canadian Division

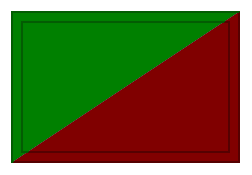
8th Canadian Division

Canadian Army Support Division

Canadian Army Doctrine and Training Division

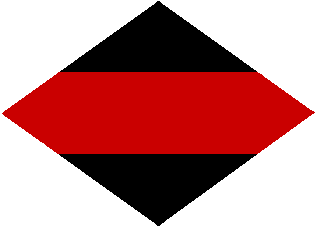
1st Canadian Armoured Brigade

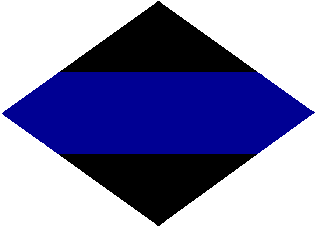
2nd Canadian Armoured Brigade

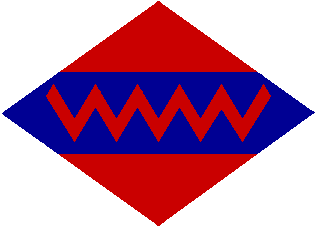
Formation patch used by Royal Canadian Artillery
units attached to the First Canadian Army
