= Juno (bear) =

Canadian Army mascot

- Species: Polar bear (Ursus maritimus)
- Sex: Female
- Born: November 11, 2015 (age 10); Toronto, Ontario
- Occupation: Army mascot
- Named after: Juno Beach
- Military career
- Allegiance: Canada
- Branch: Canadian Army
- Service years: 2016 – present
- Rank: Master Corporal

Master Corporal Juno (born November 11, 2015) is a female polar bear who serves as the Canadian Army's official mascot. Juno resides at the Toronto Zoo.

On February 27, 2016, Juno was made an honorary private and official live mascot of the Canadian Army. On her first birthday, she was promoted to honorary corporal. On November 11, 2020, Juno was promoted to honorary master corporal, and became the highest-ranking bear as recognized by the Guinness World Records.

Juno serves as symbol of the Canadian Army and helps contribute to its morale, public affairs, and corporate image.

== History ==
Juno was born on November 11, 2015, Remembrance Day. She was named by Toronto Zoo staff after Juno Beach, where many Canadian soldiers were injured and killed in the Normandy landings in World War II. Within a week of her birth, her twin brother had died and her mother, Aurora, was not producing the colostrum she needed. She became lethargic and quiet, so zoo staff took her away from her mother and attempted to "hand raise" her.

After being adopted by the Canadian Army, Juno was deployed on Operation Socialization to Assiniboine Park Zoo, in Winnipeg, Manitoba, from March 2017 to October 2018, an 18-month deployment.

== See also ==
- Major General Sir Nils Olav III of the Norwegian King's Guard, residing in the penguin enclosure at Edinburgh Zoo as of 2026
