= Sandhurst Competition =

Military skills competition

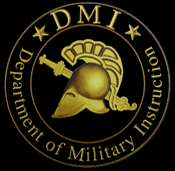
- Date: April
- Locations: West Point, New York
- Inaugurated: 1967
- Most recent: 2025

The Sandhurst Military Skills Competition is a military skills competition at West Point that first began in 1967 with the presentation of a British officer's sword to the United States Corps of Cadets by the British Exchange Officer. 2010's event, dubbed SANCOM10, was a two-day event conducted at West Point, New York. The 2009 competition featured a record 49 teams and nearly 500 competitors. Besides the 36 squads from each of the West Point companies, visiting service academy teams included the Naval, Air Force and Coast Guard Academies, Britain's Royal Military Academy Sandhurst (RMAS) teams "Red" and "Blue", Australia's Royal Military College Duntroon, Canada's Royal Military College (RMC), the National Military Academy of Afghanistan, and the Chilean Military School. That year saw eight ROTC squads: Texas A&M, BYU, East Carolina University, Iowa State University, Florida Tech, Georgetown, University of Hawaii, and Appalachian State.

== History ==
A U.S. Air Force Academy Cadet crosses one-rope bridge in 2004.

In 1967, the Royal Military Academy Sandhurst (RMAS) presented West Point with a British officer's sword. The intent was for the sword to be the prize for a competition, the aim of which was to promote military excellence among the Corps of Cadets. The original purpose statement read as follows; "To provide the Corps of Cadets with a challenging and rewarding regimental skills competition, which will enhance professional development and military excellence in selected soldier skills." Between 1967 and 1975, the competition criteria were similar to those for the current Superintendent's Award, that is: Varsity Athletic participation, Intramural sports performance, physical fitness tests, drill and ceremonies and Cadet Brigade Company evaluations.

In 1975 the then Commandant, BG Philip R. Feir and the British Exchange Officer, Major Robert Hodges, KORBR, studied the criteria and determined that they were inappropriate. They felt that the criteria fell short of the original intent of the award which was to increase 'military excellence in the field'. More specifically they recommended that the format be changed significantly to test the cadets' ability to "shoot, move, and communicate", stressing teamwork among the classes as a fundamental and essential element in the competition. Thus the competition was set up to be conducted in the Spring during drill and intramural time to include the following; equipment inspection, communications, weapon handling, swift movement, shooting and land navigation. All 36 companies provided 5 four-man patrols and one alternate patrol per company, with all four classes represented in each patrol. Over 864 cadets competed each year, or 20% of the Corps. The competition was conducted at Camp Buckner during 20 weekdays in April. The logistical problems of the program led to calls for it to move to Summer Training, and so in 1981, a major placement study took place. It concluded that the advantages of conducting it in the Spring outweighed the disadvantages, and also recommended that it should take place at West Point. So in 1982, the competition was run in two phases, again in April, in roughly the same format, with a navigation course on one day, set by the orienteering club, and the firing of the M16 sub-caliber device in the indoor range.

In 1986 it was decided that the teams should complete the competition on a single day, to include firing the M16 on an outdoor range. In 1988 company team composition changed to 2 nine person squads including one female, instead of the 5 four-man patrols. From 1992 onwards, one team of nine from each company have competed, together with a varying number of ROTC teams. Since 1993 two teams from RMA Sandhurst have taken part, and from 1997, a team from RMC Canada has also participated. 2002 saw a further increase in the number of external teams competing; including a team from Germany (to help mark the Bi-Centennial Competition), and teams from the Naval, Air Force and Coast Guard Academies. The 2003 Competition saw the German Team replaced by the Merchant Marine Academy.

The Reginald E. Johnson Memorial Plaque is awarded to the competition's highest scoring squad each year. It is commemorated to team leader Cadet Reggie Johnson who died while taking part in the land navigation phase of the competition on Friday, 11 April 1980. The original plaque was replaced in 1999 with a mounted cadet sabre, to be presented annually to the best team. The competition was won for the first time by RMC (Canada) in 2005 and they successfully defended their title during both the 2006 and 2007 Sandhurst Competitions.

== The competition today ==
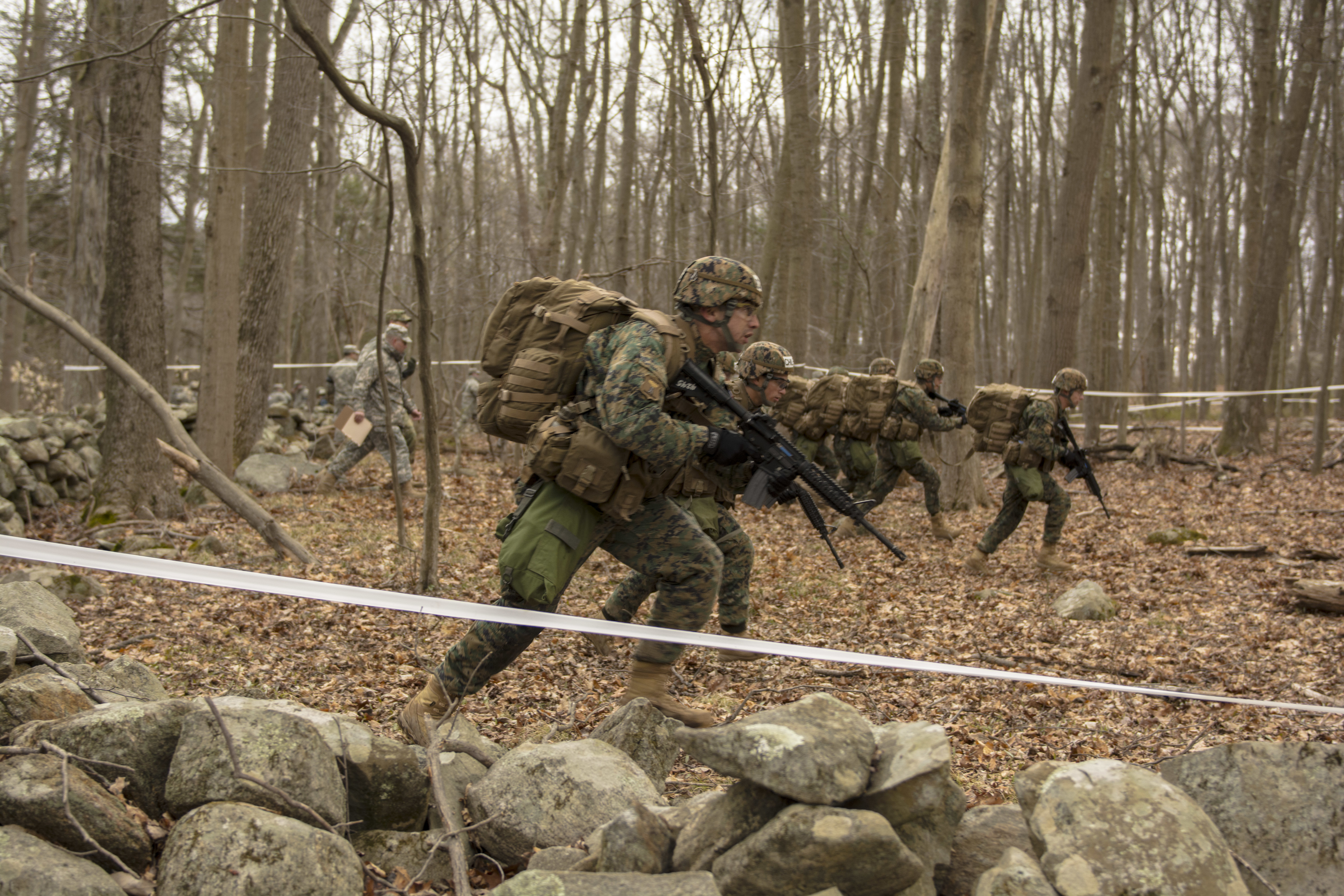
Cadets from the Turkish Military Academy during the 2016 Sandhurst competition

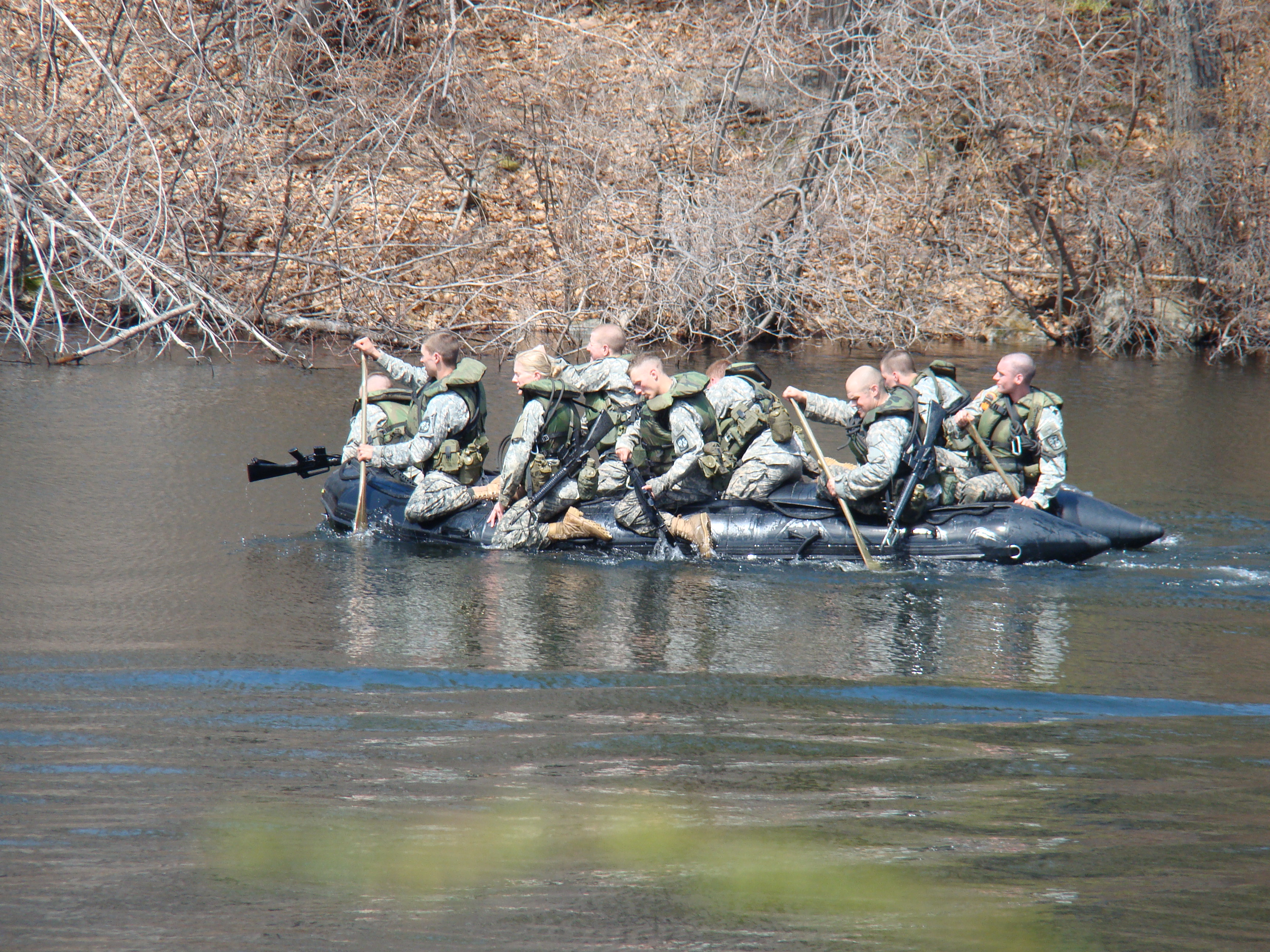
Texas A&M's Squad at the boat skill in 2009.

Since 1986, each USMA cadet company and visiting team selects an 11-member squad (at least two female members) with two alternates. A West Point female cadet volunteers to work with the Afghan team's squad as there are no women at the NMAA. Each squad is required to perform a series of military tasks along a route which took most teams approximately four hours to complete. Scores are determined by combining the points they earn by performing each military task along the route, with the points earned for completing the course within the 4-hour time frame. Examples of events include rappelling, building and crossing a one-rope bridge, obstacle course navigation, combat swim (with full gear), rifle marksmanship, a raft paddle, 12' wall climb, and weapon handling skills. This year's weapons events were held the evening prior to the course navigation phase. In 2005, Britain's Prince Harry (then third in line for the British crown) visited West Point and participated in the competition as a Sandhurst cadet. In 2014, Sandhurst Blue from RMAS won the competition.

== Winning squad ==
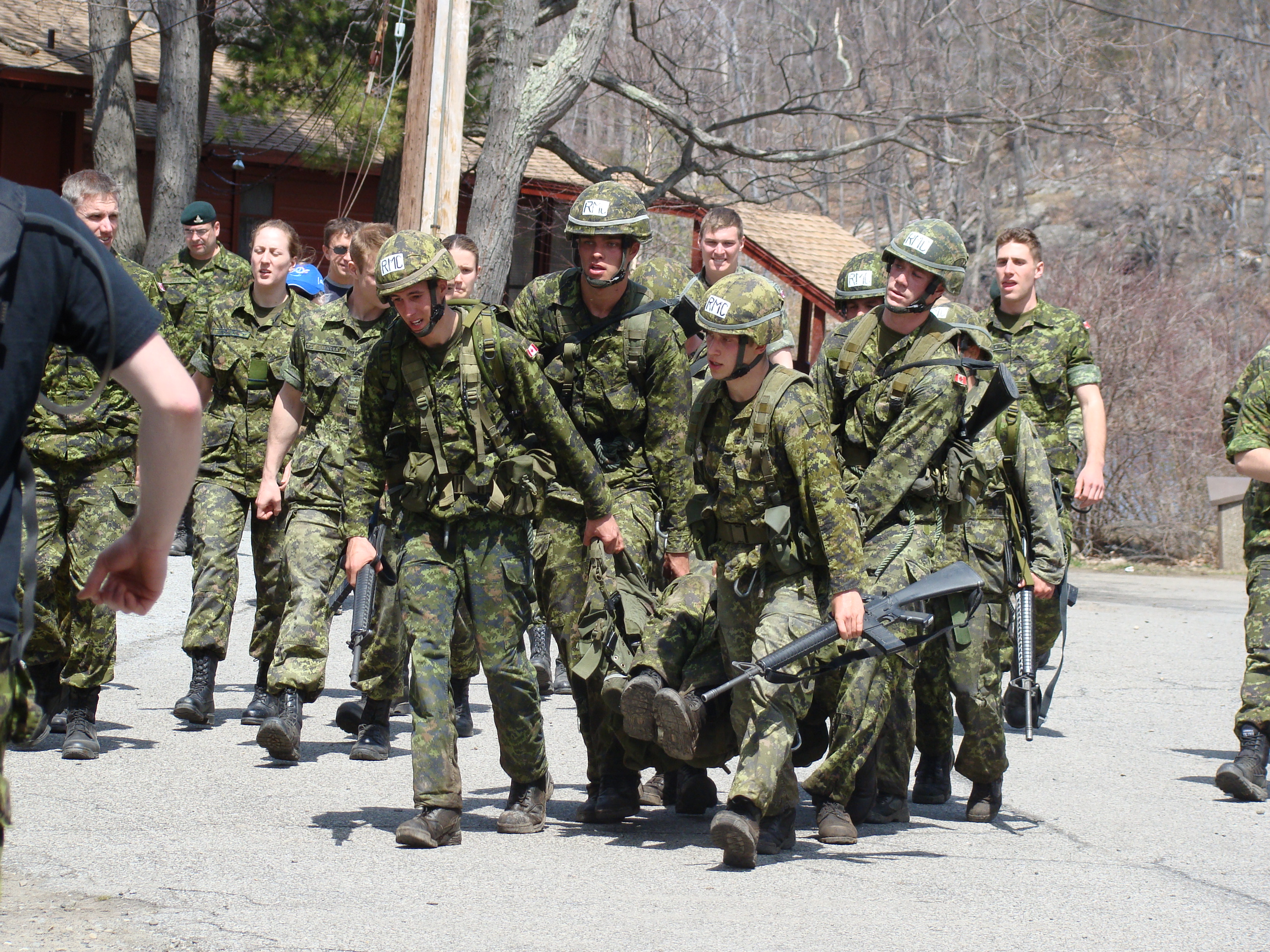
2009's champion squad: Royal Military College of Canada

Since 1994, when RMA Sandhurst began holding the event, the competition was won by either a Sandhurst squad or a Royal Military College of Canada squad, until 2011 when Company B-3 of West Point won. The Royal Military College of Canada took the honors for the fifth time in 2016. In 2021, for the first time, USMA Black & Gold had a clean sweep by ranking both 1st and 2nd in the competition respectively.

2026 - USMA Black
2025 - USMA Black
2024 - USMA Black
2023 - USMA Black
2022 - United States Air Force Academy
2021 - USMA Black
2020 - No Competition (COVID)
2019 - USMA Black
2018 - United States Air Force Academy
2017 - USMA Black
2016 - Royal Military College of Canada
2015 - Sandhurst Red
2014 - Sandhurst Blue
2013 - Sandhurst Blue
2012 - Royal Military College of Australia - Duntroon
2011 - USMA B-3
2010 - Sandhurst A
2009 - Royal Military College of Canada
2008 - Sandhurst Red
2007 - Royal Military College of Canada
2006 - Royal Military College of Canada
2004 - Sandhurst Red
2003 - Sandhurst Blue
2002 - Sandhurst Red
2001 - Sandhurst Blue
2000 - Sandhurst 2
1999 - Sandhurst 1
1998 - Sandhurst 2
1997 - Sandhurst 1
1996 - Sandhurst 1
1995 - Sandhurst 1
1994 - Sandhurst 1
