= Canadian Army Support Division =

- CASD formation patch
- Active: 10 September 2026–Present
- Country: Canada
- Branch: Canadian Army
- Type: Support Division
- Role: Logistical support Technical support
- Size: 13,000 (Note: 5,880 Regular Force members, 5,980 Reserve Force members, 620 Canadian Rangers, and 1,140 civilian employees as of September 2026)
- Garrison/HQ: Kingston, Ontario
- Nickname: CASD (English abbreviation)
- Mottos: Pax et bello paratus (English: Prepared in peace and war)
- Colors: Red and Green

The Canadian Army Support Division is a Division of the Canadian Army that was formed as part of the restructuring of the Canadian Armed Forces.

== History ==
The Canadian Army Support Division was formed on 10 September 2026 as part of the 2026 restructuring of the Canadian Armed Forces. The division is headquartered in Kingston, Ontario. The purpose of the division is to provide support to the operations of the Canadian Army.

== Organization ==
- CASD Headquarters
- Canadian Support Group Atlantic
  - CSGA HQ
  - CFB Gagetown
  - Camp Aldershot
  - Garrison Sydney
  - Garrison St. john’s
  - Detachment Charlottetown
  - Atlantic Signals Squadron
- Canadian Support Group East
  - CSGE HQ
  - CFB Valcartier
  - CFB Montreal
  - Garrison St-Jean
- Canadian Support Group Central
  - CSGC HQ
  - CFB Petawawa
  - CFB Meaford
  - Garrison Toronto
  - Central Signals Squadron
- Canadian Support Group West
  - CSGW HQ
  - CFB Edmonton
  - CFB Shilo
  - CFB Suffield
  - CFB Wainwright
- CFB Kingston
