= List of Canadian Coast Guard bases and stations =

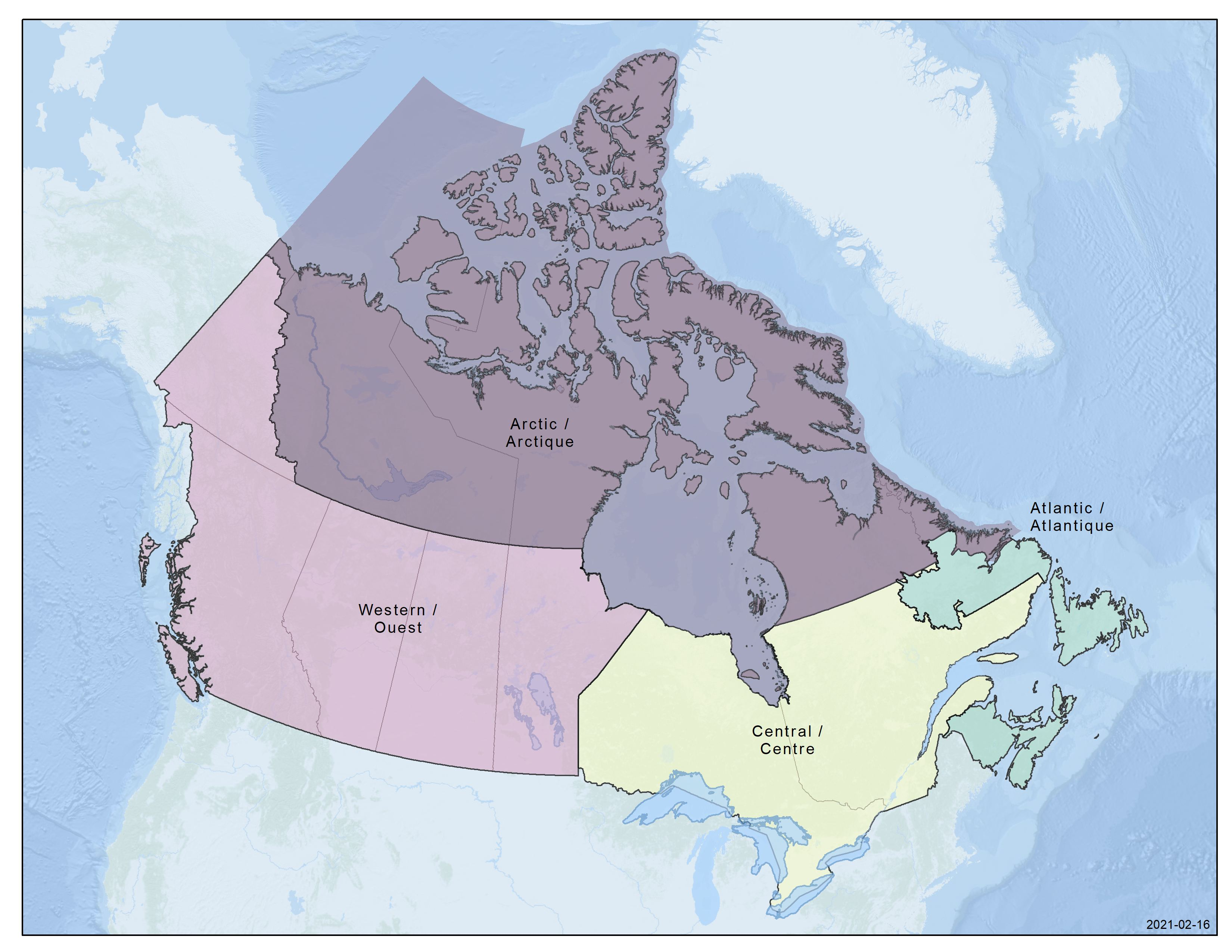
Map showing the operating regions of the Canadian Coast Guard: the Atlantic Region, the Central Region, the Arctic Region and the Western Region

The Canadian Coast Guard (CCG) maintains a number of major bases and operating stations on the Atlantic and Pacific coasts, as well as in the St. Lawrence River, Great Lakes and major navigable inland waterways such as Lake of the Woods, Lake Winnipeg, and Great Slave Lake/Mackenzie River.

Currently, there are no vessels permanently based in the eastern Arctic, although CCG vessels and aircraft frequently operate there, staging out of bases on the Atlantic coast and supported by a base in Iqaluit, Nunavut.

== Organization ==
In October 2018, it was announced that the Canadian Department of Fisheries and Oceans and the Canadian Coast Guard would be reorganized into four operational regions with the creation of a new Arctic Region; this transition to four regions was completed in April 2021.

Canadian Coast Guard regions are defined as:

- The Arctic Region consists of the Yukon North slope, Northwest Territories, Nunavut, Nunavik, Nunatsiavut, and Hudson and James Bay. This boundary is inclusive of Inuit Nunangat.
- The Western Region consists of British Columbia, Alberta, Saskatchewan, Manitoba and Yukon, minus the Yukon slope.
- The Central Region consists of Ontario and Quebec, minus the Nunavik region in northern Quebec.
- The Atlantic Region consists of New Brunswick, Nova Scotia, Prince Edward Island, and Newfoundland and Labrador, minus the Nunatsiavut region in Labrador.

== Bases and stations ==
- CCG National Headquarters Ottawa, Ottawa, ON

=== Arctic Region ===
- CCG Regional Headquarters, Arctic Region, Yellowknife NT
- CCG Base Hay River, Hay River, NT
- CCG Base Iqaluit, Iqaluit, NU
- CCG IRB Station, Rankin Inlet, NU

=== Atlantic Region ===
- CCG Regional Headquarters, Atlantic Region, St. John's, NL
- CCG Base Dartmouth, Dartmouth, NS
- CCG Station Bickerton, Bickerton East, NS
- CCG Station Burgeo, Burgeo, NL
- CCG Station Burin, Burin, NL
- CCG Station Clark's Harbour, Clark's Harbour, NS
- CCG Station Courtney Bay, Saint John, NB
- CCG Station Lark Harbour, Lark Harbour, NL
- CCG Station Louisbourg, Louisbourg, NS
- CCG Station Old Perlican, Old Perlican, NL
- CCG Station Port au Choix, Port au Choix, NL
- CCG Station St. Anthony, St. Anthony, NL
- CCG Station Sambro, Sambro, NS
- CCG Station Shippagan, Shippagan, NB
- CCG Station Souris, Souris, PE
- CCG Station Summerside, Summerside, PE
- CCG Station Twillingate, Twillingate, NL
- CCG Station Westport, Westport, NS
- CCG IRB Station Bonavista Bay, Terra Nova National Park
- CCG IRB Station Charlottetown, Charlottetown, PE
- CCG IRB Station Conception Bay, Conception Bay South, NL
- CCG IRB Station Halifax, Halifax, NS
- CCG IRB Station Mahone Bay, Chester, NS
- CCG IRB Station Notre Dame Bay, Lewisporte, NL
- CCG IRB Station Pictou, Pictou, NS
- CCG IRB Station Saint John River, Grand Bay-Westfield, NB
- CCG IRB Station Shediac, Shediac, NB
- Joint Rescue Coordination Centre Halifax, CFB Halifax
- Canadian Coast Guard College, Westmount, NS

=== Central Region ===
- CCG Regional Headquarters, Central Region, Sarnia, ON
- CCG Base Burlington, Burlington, ON
- CCG Base Parry Sound, Parry Sound, ON
- CCG Base Prescott, Prescott, ON
- CCG Base Quebec, Quebec, QC - also home to Maritime Rescue Sub-Centre Quebec
- CCG Base Sorel, Sorel, QC
- CCG Base Thunder Bay, Thunder Bay, ON
- CCG Sub-Base Amherstburg, Amherstburg, ON
- CCG Sub-Base Kenora, Kenora, ON
- CCG Hovercraft Base Trois-Rivières, Trois-Rivières, QC
- CCG Station Cap-aux-Meules, Cap-aux-Meules, QC
- CCG Station Cobourg, Cobourg, ON
- CCG Station Goderich, Goderich, ON
- CCG Station Havre-Saint-Pierre, Havre-Saint-Pierre, QC
- CCG Station Kegaska, Kegaska, QC
- CCG Station Kingston, Kingston, ON
- CCG Station Meaford, Meaford, ON
- CCG Station Port Dover, Port Dover, ON
- CCG Station Port Weller, Port Weller, ON
- CCG Station Rivière-au-Renard, Rivière-au-Renard, QC
- CCG Station Tadoussac, Tadoussac, QC
- CCG Station Tobermory, Tobermory, ON
- CCG IRB Station Brebeuf, Brebeuf Island, ON
- CCG IRB Station Britt, Gereaux Island, ON
- CCG IRB Station Hill Island, Hill Island, ON
- CCG IRB Station Lac des Deux Montagnes, Oka, QC
- CCG IRB Station Lac St-Francois, Valleyfield, QC
- CCG IRB Station Lac St-Louis, Beaconsfield, QC
- CCG IRB Station Long Point, St. Williams, ON
- CCG IRB Station Montreal, Montreal, QC
- CCG IRB Station Montreal Harbour, Longueuil, QC
- CCG IRB Station Port Lambton, Port Lambton, ON
- CCG IRB Station Quebec, Quebec, QC
- CCG IRB Station Sorel, Sorel, QC
- CCG IRB Station Thames River, Lighthouse Cove, ON
- CCG IRB Station Trois-Rivières, Trois-Rivières, QC
- Joint Rescue Coordination Centre Trenton, CFB Trenton

=== Western Region ===
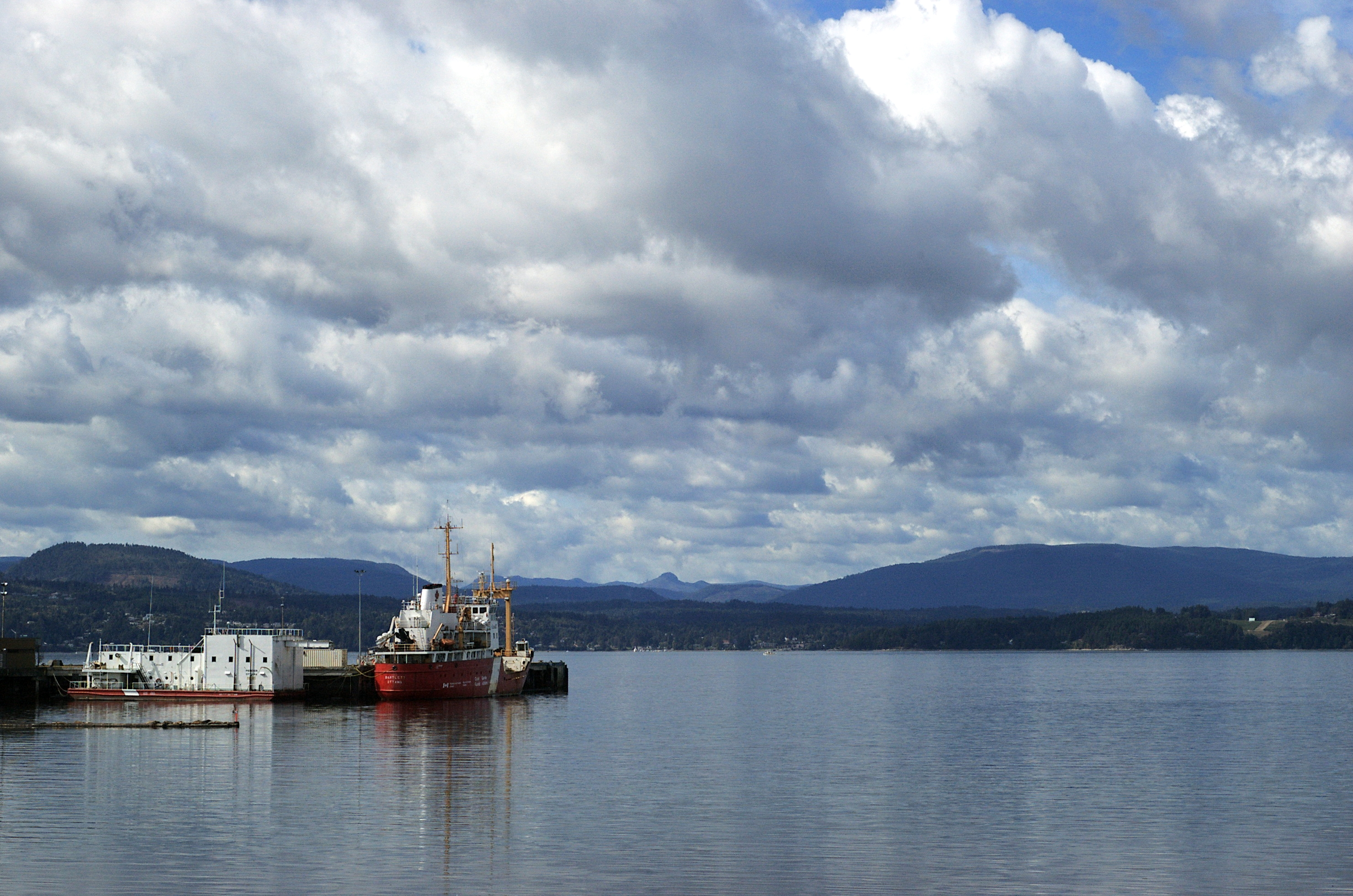
Patricia Bay Base

- CCG Regional Headquarters, Western Region, Victoria, BC
- CCG Base Patricia Bay (at Victoria Airport), Sidney, BC
- CCG Base Seal Cove, Prince Rupert, BC
- CCG Base Selkirk, Selkirk, MB
- CCG Hovercraft Base Sea Island, Richmond, BC
- CCG Base Hardy Bay, Port Hardy, BC
- CCG Station Bamfield, Bamfield, BC
- CCG Station Bella Bella, Bella Bella, BC
- CCG Station Campbell River, Campbell River, BC
- CCG Station Ganges, Saltspring Island, BC
- CCG Station Gimli, Gimli, MB
- CCG Station Kitsilano, Vancouver, BC
- CCG Station Port Hardy, Port Hardy, BC
- CCG Station Powell River, Powell River, BC
- CCG Station Sandspit, Sandspit, BC
- CCG Station Tahsis, Tahsis, BC
- CCG Station Tofino, Tofino, BC
- CCG Station Victoria, Victoria, BC
- CCG IRB Station Cortes Island, Cortes Island, BC
- CCG IRB Station Nootka Sound, Nootka Sound, BC
- CCG IRB Station Kelsey Bay, Kelsey Bay, BC
- CCG IRB Station Sointula, Sointula, BC
- Joint Rescue Coordination Centre Victoria, CFB Esquimalt

== See also ==
- List of Canadian Coast Guard MCTS Centres
- Equipment of the Canadian Coast Guard
