= Canadian Armed Forces Search and Rescue =

Navy and Air Force resources and operations

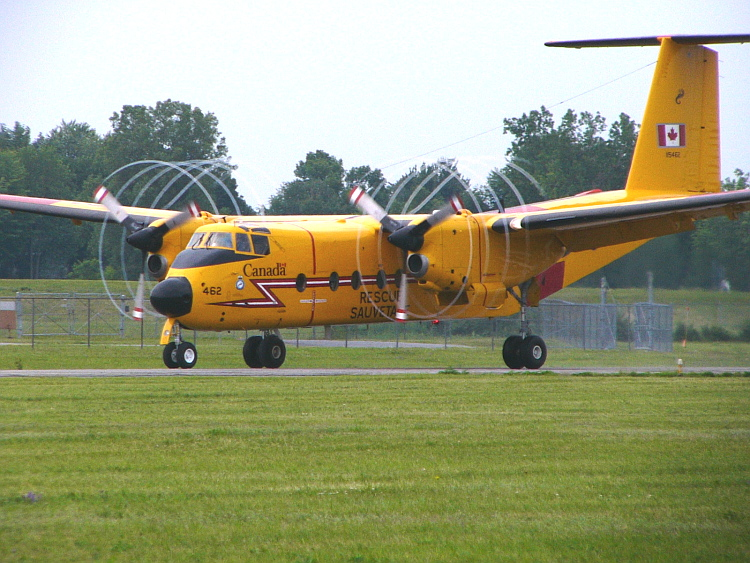
Canadian Forces CC-115 Buffalo fixed wing SAR aircraft from 442 Transport and Rescue Squadron.

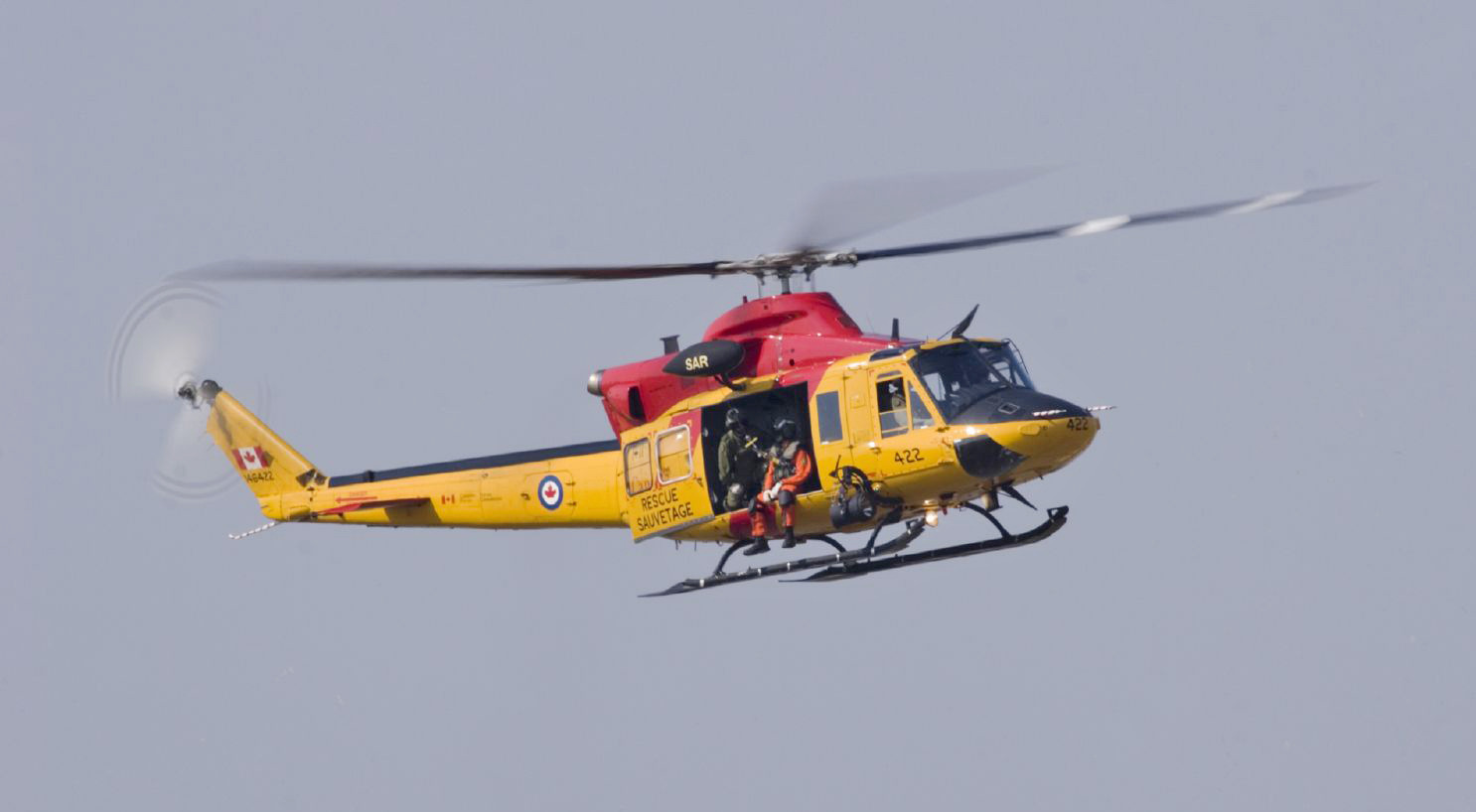
CH-146 Griffon in SAR markings

Canadian Armed Forces Search and Rescue (CAFSAR; French: Recherche et sauvetage des Forces armées canadiennes) is the collective name used to refer to search and rescue (SAR) resources and operations within the Canadian Armed Forces (CAF). The Royal Canadian Navy (RCN) and Royal Canadian Air Force (RCAF) are jointly responsible for Canada’s SAR operations.

== History ==
Military search and rescue in Canada traces its history to 1942 when Wilfred "Wop" May pioneered the concept of parachuting survival experts into airplane crash sites. The Royal Canadian Air Force, impressed with "Wop's" rescue squad, enrolled the first three RCAF Pararescue jumpers in June 1944. January 1945 saw the first RCAF pararescue course with graduates stationed to Dartmouth, Nova Scotia; Sea Island, British Columbia; and Edmonton, Alberta. The RCAF and the Fleet Air Arm of the Royal Canadian Navy (RCN) began to task aircraft resources for SAR operations and occasionally perform joint operations. Unification of the RCAF and RCN with the Canadian Army in 1968 formed the Canadian Armed Forces, at which time SAR operations were divided between Maritime Command and Force Mobile Command.

The formation of the Canadian Coast Guard in 1962, as well as its civilian predecessor agencies and some volunteer organizations, have held responsibility for the vast majority of maritime SAR operations in Canada since the 19th century. Pacific and Atlantic maritime SAR is directed from Joint Rescue Coordination Centres (JRCC) located at Maritime Pacific and Atlantic Naval Headquarters in Esquimalt, BC and Halifax, NS. The centres are staffed by Royal Canadian Air Force and Canadian Coast Guard personnel. A third JRCC is located at Trenton, Ontario and is responsible for the Great Lakes and the North.

In 2014, the RCAF revamped its FWSAR replacement project to have the competitors suggest the best locations to base the aircraft out of.

== Operations ==
Search and rescue operations cover the entirety of Canada's SAR Region (SRR) which measures 15,540,000 km^{2} (6,000,000 sq mi). Resources are operationally administered in three SAR regions by each respective Joint Rescue Coordination Centre (JRCC):

- Halifax SRR (administered by JRCC Halifax)
- Trenton SRR (administered by JRCC Trenton)
- Victoria SRR (administered by JRCC Victoria)

== Resources ==
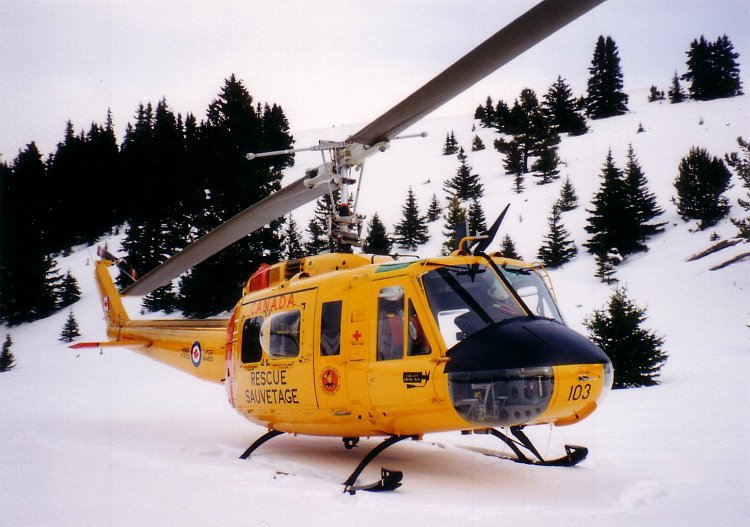
CH-118 Iroquois helicopter from CFB Cold Lake in the mountains of British Columbia.

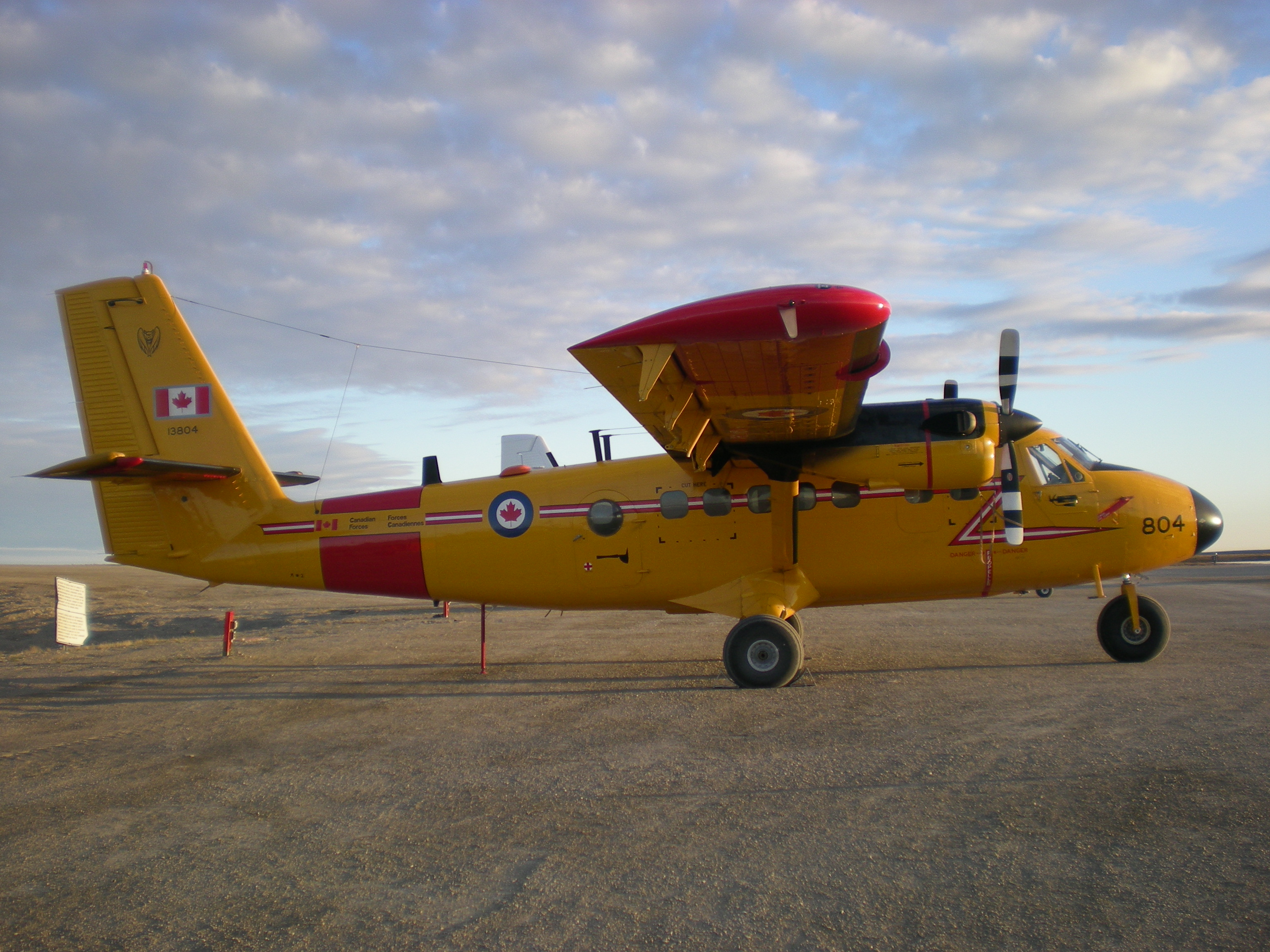
CC-138 Twin Otter at Cambridge Bay Airport.

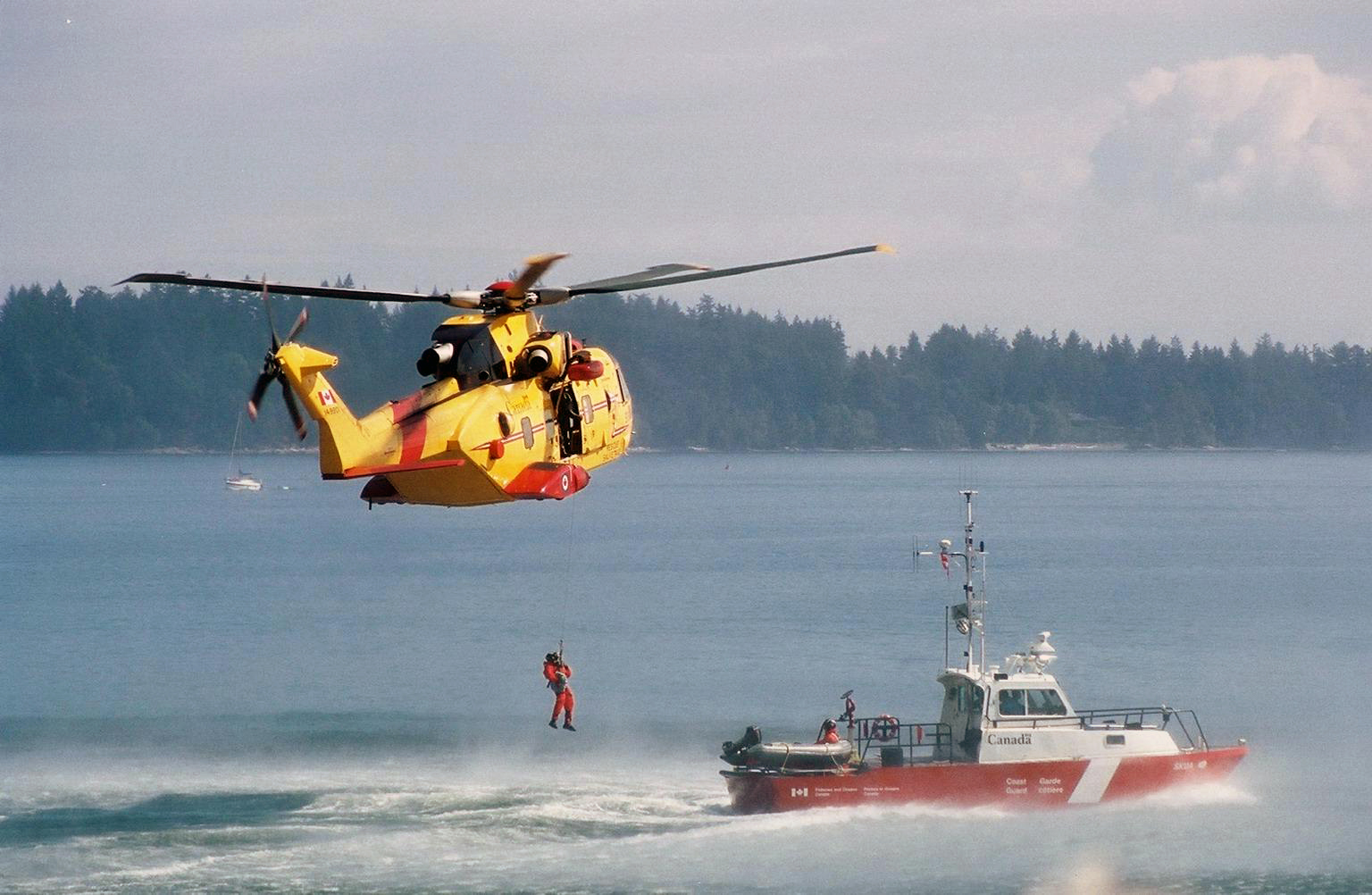
Canadian Forces CH-149 Cormorant helicopter exercising with a Canadian Coast Guard vessel.

Canadian Forces search and rescue resources are mostly in the form of squadrons of dedicated SAR aircraft located at bases across the country supported by 750 personnel, which includes ground crew, air crew, and 140 Search and Rescue Technicians (SAR Techs). They are primarily based at 5 bases across Canada. CF SAR operations occasionally provide assistance to civilian agencies which lack the resources and equipment to conduct a large scale SAR operation.

Search and Rescue technicians (SAR Techs)

Search and Rescue technicians are advanced trauma life support pararescue specialists trained in military freefall, diving, mountaineering, rappeling, wilderness survival in extreme conditions, hoist rescue operations and various other rescue-related tasks, such as securing landing zones/drop zones or leading mountain rescue operations in coordination with civilian agencies and volunteer organizations. After a two-week selection period, SAR Techs undergo 11 months of initial training at the Canadian Forces School of Search and Rescue, based at 19 Wing Comox in British Columbia.

Squadrons

- 103 Search and Rescue Squadron - 9 Wing Gander
- 413 Transport and Rescue Squadron - 14 Wing Greenwood
- 418 Search and Rescue Operational Training Squadron - 19 Wing Comox
- 424 Transport and Rescue Squadron - 8 Wing Trenton
- 435 Transport and Rescue Squadron - 17 Wing Winnipeg
- 442 Transport and Rescue Squadron - 19 Wing Comox

Equipment

- CH-149 Cormorant, land-based SAR helicopter
- CH-146 Griffon, land-based SAR helicopter
- CC-130 Hercules, transport and rescue (long-range)
- CC-295 Kingfisher, rescue (delivery underway; full operational capability 2029)

Additional resources available for SAR include:

- CC-138 Twin Otter, primarily transport aircraft. The Twin Otters often participate in Arctic SAR missions because they are the only RCAF aircraft permanently based in Northern Canada.
- CP-140 Aurora, anti-submarine/marine reconnaissance fixed wing (sometimes used to assist search and rescue in marine operations).

Retired aircraft (1968–present)

- CH-113 Labrador, helicopter (replaced by CH-149 Cormorant)
- CH-118 Iroquois, land based SAR helicopter (replaced by CH-146 Griffon)
- Vertol Model H-21B or Vertol Model 44A (Royal Canadian Air Force)
- Grumman SA-16 Albatross (Royal Canadian Air Force)
- Consolidated PBY Canso (Royal Canadian Air Force)
- C-47 Dakota (Royal Canadian Air Force)
- Sikorsky S-55 (Royal Canadian Navy)
- CH-124 Sea King, anti-submarine/multimission helicopter
- CC-115 Buffalo, transport and rescue (retired)

== See also ==
- National Search and Rescue Program
