= Joint Rescue Coordination Centre =

Joint Rescue Coordination Centre is a specific Rescue coordination centre and may refer to:

== Canada ==
- Joint Rescue Coordination Centre Halifax
- Joint Rescue Coordination Centre Trenton
- Joint Rescue Coordination Centre Victoria

== Norway ==
- Joint Rescue Coordination Centre of Northern Norway
- Joint Rescue Coordination Centre of Southern Norway
