= MRSC =

MRSC may refer to:

- Maritime Rescue Sub-Centre, a rescue coordination centre dedicated to organizing search and rescue in a maritime environment
  - MRSC St. John's in Newfoundland and Labrador, Canada
  - MRSC Quebec in Quebec, Canada
- Member of the Royal Society of Canada
- Member of the Royal Society of Chemistry
- Municipal Research and Services Center, a Seattle, Washington, organization
