= Maritime Rescue Sub-Centre St. John's =

Canadian Coast Guard centre

Coordinates: 47.5584°N 52.7046°W

Maritime Rescue Sub-Centre St. John's (MRSC St. John's) is one of two Maritime Rescue Sub-Centres operated by the Canadian Coast Guard.

== Operations ==
In Canada, MRSCs are established to enhance maritime SAR co-ordination through improved communications and local knowledge. MRSCs thus expedite the initiation of appropriate action and allow a timely response to SAR incidents within their Search and Rescue Sub-Region (SRS). The responsibilities of an MRSC are similar to those of a JRCC, but on a smaller scale. MRSCs carry out SAR co-ordination functions under the authority of the SRR Commander through the JRCC, including co-ordinating responses to humanitarian incidents in accordance with national and regional policies. MRSCs normally co-ordinate maritime SAR incidents which occur within their SRS.

As such, MRSC St. John's is responsible for tasking appropriate maritime SAR resources in order to solve an incident. This is most often the dedicated SAR vessels of the Canadian Coast Guard, however, they may also initiate a request for other resources such as Canadian Coast Guard Auxiliary vessels, Royal Canadian Air Force primary or secondary SAR aircraft, Royal Canadian Navy warships, or Royal Canadian Mounted Police and municipal police small craft as required.

MRSC St. John's is tasked with coordinating maritime search and rescue operations in waters surrounding the province of Newfoundland and Labrador and had an area of responsibility that is located wholly within the search and rescue region (SRR) of Joint Rescue Coordination Centre Halifax (JRCC Halifax).

Any SAR operation in response to an aircraft incident remains the responsibility of JRCC Halifax or JRCC Trenton and MRSC Québec may assist the JRCC in tasking and coordinating any maritime resources and provide local expertise and assistance to the JRCC. Any SAR operation in response to an aircraft incident remains the responsibility of JRCC Halifax and MRSC St. John's may assist the JRCC in tasking and coordinating any maritime resources and provide local expertise and assistance to the JRCC.

== History ==
MRSC St. John's operated out of Canadian Coast Guard Base St. John's (CCG Base St. John's) from 1977 until May 2012 when it was closed.

=== Closure ===
MRSC St John's was closed following a decision made by the Conservative Government as part of their budget cuts in 2012. All SAR operations were then transferred to JRCC Halifax. Prior to closure the centre handled about 500 calls every year.

=== Reopening ===
In 2016 the new Liberal government of Justin Trudeau hinted at their interest to reopen the St. John's centre in the near future. In May 2018 the centre reopened and in 2019 it is expected to move to a new, purpose-built facility in St John's harbour.

== See also ==
- Maritime Rescue Sub-Centre Quebec
