= CCGA =

CCGA may refer to:

- Cornwall Commonwealth Games Association
- Canadian Coast Guard Auxiliary
- Chicago Council on Global Affairs
- College of Coastal Georgia
