= 424 Transport and Rescue Squadron =

424 "Tiger" Transport and Rescue Squadron
- Country: Canada
- Branch: (Canada) Royal Canadian Air Force
- Type: Strategic transport, Search and Rescue
- Part of: 8 Wing Trenton
- Motto: Castigandos castigamus (English: We chastise those who deserve to be chastised)
- Battle honours: English Channel and North Sea 1943–1945, Baltic 1944–1945, Fortress Europe 1943–1944, France and Germany 1944–1945, Biscay Ports 1943–1944, Ruhr 1943–1945, Berlin 1944, German Ports 1943–1945, Normandy 1944, Rhine, Biscay 1943–1944, Sicily 1943, Italy 1943, Salerno.
- Website: airforce.gc.ca

Commanders
- Commander: Lieutenant-Colonel N. Prescott

Aircraft flown
- Transport: Lockheed CC-130J Hercules and Bell CH-146 Griffon

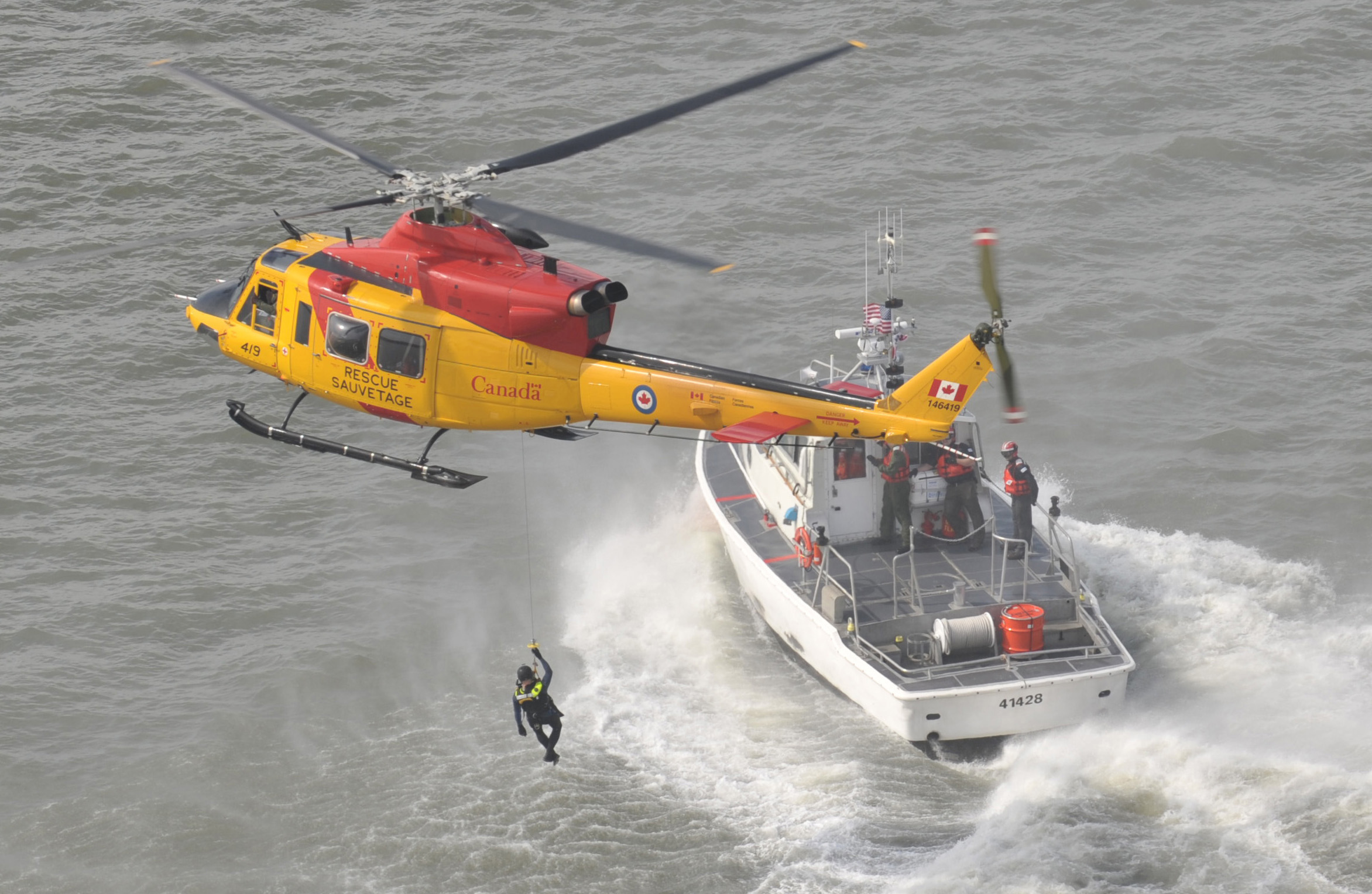
A CH-146 of the Royal Canadian Air Force 424 Squadron conducts rescue swimmer hoist training in 2012

424 Transport and Rescue Squadron (French: 424^{e} Escadron de transport et de sauvetage), nicknamed "Tiger Squadron", is a Royal Canadian Air Force strategic transport and search and rescue unit based at Canadian Forces Base (CFB) Trenton in the Canadian province of Ontario. The squadron is the primary provider of search and rescue response for the Trenton Search and Rescue Region, which extends from Quebec City to the Rocky Mountains, and from the Canada–United States border to the North Pole, covering an area of over ten million square kilometres in Central, Western, and Northern Canada.

The squadron operates the Lockheed CC-130J Hercules transport aircraft and the Bell CH-146 Griffon helicopter. Pararescue specialists, known as Search and Rescue Technicians (SAR Techs) are on constant standby to deploy within 2 hours of notification.

== The 'City of Hamilton' Squadron ==
No. 424 Squadron RCAF was formed at RAF Topcliffe, North Yorkshire on 15 October 1942, as the sixth RCAF Overseas bomber squadron, first being allocated to No. 4 Group RAF, initially equipped with the medium bomber Vickers Wellington Mk IIIs (later Mk Xs). It began operations on 15 January 1943, having joined No. 6 Group RCAF seeing moves to RAF Leeming, and then RAF Dalton. By the end of April 1943, 424 had bombed Frankfurt, Stuttgart, Mannheim, Bochum, Hamburg, Cologne, Essen, and took part in a third trip to Duisburg.

On 10 April 1943, 424 Squadron was selected to become part of No. 205 Group RAF, forming part of No. 331 (RCAF) Medium Bomber Wing, flying new Wellington bombers, for operations in North Africa. Tropicalized for use in the heat, sand, and frequent dust storms, the Wellington B.Mk.X aircraft, offered much improved performance now also able to fly on one engine. Its new mission, first to support Operation Husky, the invasion of Sicily (9/10 July) stationed in Tunisia, bombing airfields, harbours, freight yards and rail junctions.

424 Squadron was declared operational at Zina (Kairouan West) Airfield, Tunisia on 26 June 1943, operating from a rough and primitive airstrip scraped out of scrubby unused olive groves, initially bombing 'per-invasion' targets, then bombing in support of Allied Ground Forces in Sicily, and Operation AVALANCHE the invasion of Southern Italy (3 September). Flying almost nightly, the 'Tigers' operated from Zina Airfield until 29 September 1943, with moving to El Hani East Landing Ground (Kairouan)they continued to support Allied Ground Forces in Italy. The last mission of No. 331 (RCAF) Wing was on 5 October 1943 when twenty-one 'Wellington' B.Mk.X aircraft of 424 and 425 Squadrons bombed the airfield at Grosseto, Italy, half-way between Rome and Pisa, seeing their departure on 15 October 1943.

Back to Yorkshire, on 6 November 1943, 424 Squadron was assigned to No. 63 Base RCAF, at RAF Skipton-on-Swale, arriving in time for yet another North Yorkshire winter, but with a change to the Handley Page Halifax Mk. III. Operating out of Skipton-on-Swale, it continued in the night offensive against Germany throughout 1944. In October 1944, a Mat Ferguson 'Squadron Badge' was submitted to the Chester Herald of the Royal College of Arms and 'much modified' came to be approved by King George VI in June 1945, 424 Squadron finally gaining the nickname "Tiger".

In January 1945, it was re-equipped with Lancaster Mk Is and Mk IIIs and flew its final sortie in April 1945. Serving with No.1 Group RAF 'Bomber Command Strike Force', after the war, it flew POW repatriation missions from Italy from 30 August before disbanding at Skipton on 15 October 1945. The squadron was disbanded on 15 October 1945, having received fourteen battle honours.

Having lost fifty-two aircraft, 37 KIA and 236 MIA, for distinguished service the squadron was awarded 1 DSO, 1 CGM (NCOs and other ranks), 1 Bar DFC, 49 DFCs (officers & warrant officers), 11 DFMs (NCOs), and 1 MiD. The Distinguished Service Order was awarded to F/L Edward William Smith (J16164) – effective 15 March 1945, The London Gazette dated 23 March 1945, from Metis Beach QC, he completed two operational tours, first with No.102 (Ceylon) Squadron RAF, and a second with No.424 (Tiger) Squadron RCAF. "This officer has completed two very successful tours of operations. He has attacked some of the enemy's most important and heavily defended targets. On one occasion, his aircraft was shot down by enemy action and another time he was forced down on to the sea. Flight Lieutenant Smith has consistently flown in adverse weather and in the face of intense enemy opposition but he has never let that deter him from completing his missions. Throughout his operational career this officer has displayed the highest standard of courage, determination and devotion to duty."

== Post-Unification 1968 ==
Returning to Canada, the squadron was reactivated on 15 April 1946 at Mount Hope, as 424 (Light Bomber) Squadron (Auxiliary), seeing its headquarters again at 275 James Street, in The City of Hamilton, Ontario. As it was here 'The City of Hamilton' Squadron began its 'lineage' with the RCAF Canadian Home War Establishment (HWE) No. 19 Bomber Squadron, on 15 May 1935.

Having been deactivated in 1964, on 8 July 1968, with unification of the Canadian Forces, the squadron was reactivated as 424 Communications and Transport Squadron, operating from Hangar 9 at CFB Trenton. The squadron has flown more than 14 different types of aircraft during its history.

On 27 October 2011, the squadron acknowledged the death of Sergeant Janick Gilbert, a Search and Rescue technician who perished while participating in a rescue mission in the waters of Nunavut.

On 17 December 2013, a Bell CH-146 Griffon helicopter from the squadron was dispatched from CFB Trenton to Kingston, Ontario, to rescue a stranded crane operator above a large fire at a student housing project under construction. A Search and Rescue Technician was lowered by winch cable from the helicopter and successfully rescued the construction worker.

In February 2017, members of the squadron founded an association for current and former unit members. The goals of the association are to foster camaraderie between its members, commemorate the history of the unit and support its commanding officer.
