= Sri Lanka Maritime Rescue Coordinating Centre =

The Maritime Rescue Coordination Centre Colombo (MRCC Colombo) is a planned center responsible for coordinating air-sea rescue within the territorial waters of Sri Lanka and international waters. It will be located at the Naval Headquarters with a sub centre based at Hambantota, under a grant from the Government of India.

== See also ==
- Sri Lanka Navy
- Sri Lanka Coast Guard
