= Maritime Rescue Sub-Centre Quebec =

Canadian Coast Guard centre

Coordinates: 46.8097°N 71.2030°W

Maritime Rescue Sub-Centre Quebec (MRSC Quebec; French: Sous-centre de secours maritime) is a Canadian Maritime Rescue Sub-Centre that coordinates search and rescue operations in the following waters:

- the St. Lawrence River within the province of Quebec
- the northern and western waters of the Gulf of St. Lawrence within the province of Quebec
- the navigable estuary portion of the Saguenay River
- the Richelieu River within the province of Quebec
- the southern portion of the Ottawa River downstream from the Carillon Generating Station

Operated by the Canadian Coast Guard (CCG), MRSC Quebec has an area of responsibility that straddles the search and rescue regions (SRR) of Joint Rescue Coordination Centre Halifax (JRCC Halifax) in the east and Joint Rescue Coordination Centre Trenton (JRCC Trenton) in the west.

In Canada, MRSCs are established to enhance maritime SAR co-ordination through improved communications and local knowledge. MRSCs thus speed up the initiation of appropriate action, and allow a timely response to SAR incidents within their Search and Rescue Sub-Region (SRS). MRSC Québec is also the sole bilingual Search and Rescue Centre in Canada and one of the two Rescue centres in North America using French language as the main working language (Fort-de-France, in Martinique being the second one).

MRSC Québec is responsible for tasking appropriate maritime SAR resources in order to resolve an incident. This is most often the dedicated SAR vessels of the Canadian Coast Guard, however, they may also initiate a request for other resources like volunteers from the Canadian Coast Guard Auxiliary, Royal Canadian Air Force primary or secondary SAR aircraft, Royal Canadian Navy warships, Sûreté du Québec small craft, and municipal police small craft as required.

Any SAR operation in response to an aircraft incident remains the responsibility of JRCC Halifax or JRCC Trenton and MRSC Québec may assist the JRCC in tasking and coordinating any maritime resources and provide local expertise and assistance to the JRCC.

MRSC Quebec has operated out of Canadian Coast Guard Base Quebec (CCG Base Quebec) since 1977 and handles an average of 1500 incidents each year.
