= Joint Rescue Coordination Centre Halifax =

Canadian rescue coordination centre

Joint Rescue Coordination Centre Halifax (JRCC Halifax)
- Centre conjoint de coordination des opérations de sauvetage Halifax
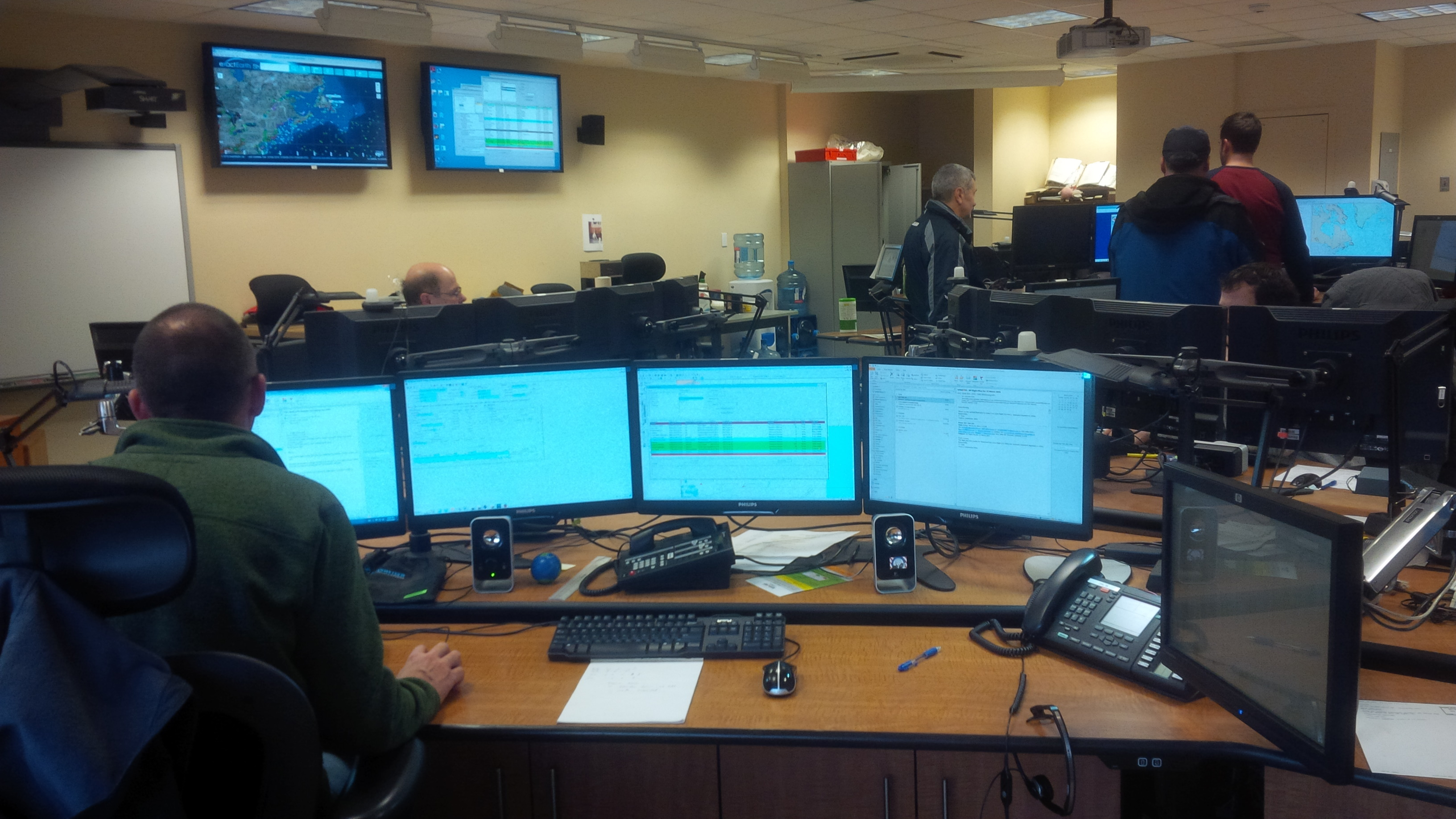

JRCC overview
- Jurisdiction: Halifax Search and Rescue Region (SRR)
- Headquarters: Halifax, Nova Scotia; 44.6617813°N 63.5884056°W
- Ministers responsible: David McGuinty, Minister of National Defence; Joanne Thompson, Minister of Fisheries, Oceans, and the Canadian Coast Guard
- JRCC executives: Major Christopher Simm, Officer in Charge; Major Stephen Park, Succeeded; Steve Waller, CCG Lead
- Parent department: Canadian Armed Forces (CAF); Canadian Coast Guard (CCG)
- Website: www.canada.ca/en/department-national-defence/services/operations/military-operations/types/search-rescue/eastern-canada.html

The Joint Rescue Coordination Centre Halifax (JRCC Halifax) is a rescue coordination centre operated by the Royal Canadian Air Force (RCAF) and the Canadian Coast Guard (CCG).

JRCC Halifax is responsible for coordinating the Search and Rescue (SAR) response to air and marine incidents within the Halifax Search and Rescue Region (SRR). This region covers areas of the Atlantic Ocean west of 30° west longitude, north of 42° north latitude and south of 70° north latitude. It includes the land mass of eastern Canada comprising the entirety of Newfoundland and Labrador, Prince Edward Island, New Brunswick, Nova Scotia, the eastern half of Quebec, the southern half of Baffin Island and the French archipelago of St. Pierre and Miquelon. This area measures 4.7 million km^{2} of which approximately 80% is water.

As a secondary role, JRCC Halifax coordinates requests by other levels of government for federal SAR resources. These secondary request are commonly made for humanitarian reasons that fall within provincial or municipal jurisdiction (e.g., searching for missing hunters, hoisting injured hikers and medical evacuation when civilian agencies are unable due to weather or location).

== Mission ==
"The national search and rescue (SAR) objective is to prevent loss of life and injury through search and rescue alerting, responding and aiding activities using public and private resources."

JRCC Halifax coordinates and controls Search and Rescue Units (SRUs) within its area of responsibility. The centre serves as a communications hub and primary point of contact for the coordination and direction of rescue units and on-scene commanders in order to meet the national objective in the safest and most effective manner possible.

== Command and control ==
The minister of national defence has overall responsibility for the operation of the coordinated federal SAR system with primary (full-time) SAR resources provided by the Canadian Forces and Department of Fisheries and Oceans. Within the Canadian Forces, SAR policy and procedures are the responsibility of Canadian Joint Operations Command, with each JRCC being operationally responsible to the senior military officer in their region. JRCC Halifax is responsible to the commander of Joint Task Force (Atlantic).

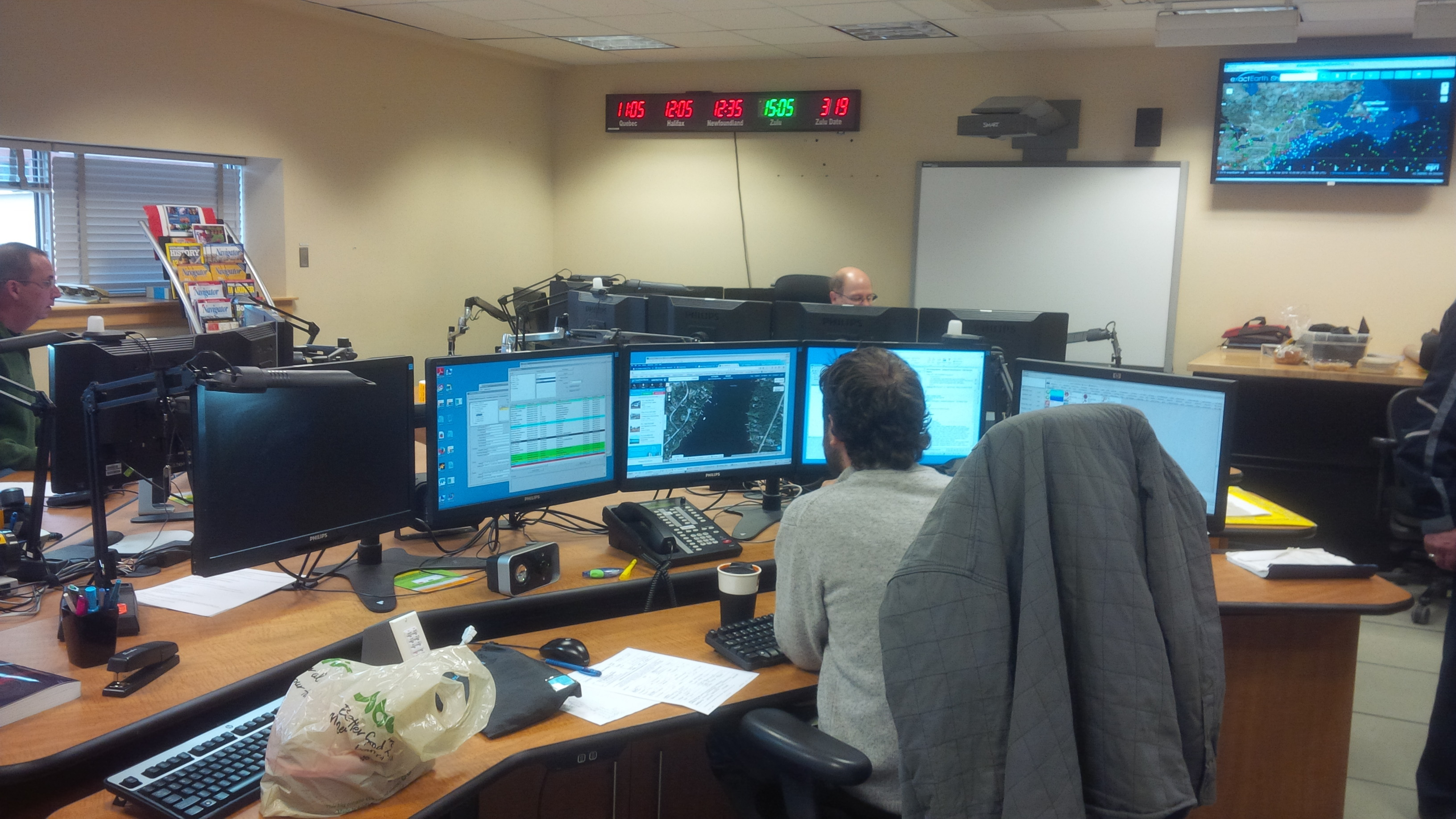
Joint Rescue Coordination Centre Halifax (JRCC Halifax)

== Personnel ==
JRCC Halifax is staffed by personnel from the RCAF and CCG 24 hours a day, year-round. Duty staff are

- three maritime SAR co-ordinators commonly referred to as the "marine controllers" (experienced CCG officers),
- one assistant maritime SAR co-ordinator or "marine assistant" (experienced CCG officer),
- one aeronautical SAR co-ordinator commonly referred to as the "air controller" (experienced RCAF pilot or navigator); and
- one assistant aeronautical SAR co-ordinator or "air assistant" (experienced RCAF air traffic controller or air weapon controller).

Air and Marine controllers are collectively called "mission coordinators". All JRCC personnel function together as a team to ensure that response to distress incidents is co-ordinated effectively.

== Location ==
JRCC Halifax is located at CFB Halifax in Halifax, Nova Scotia. JRCC Halifax is connected with the Canadian Mission Control Centre (CMCC), Nav Canada, and the Canadian Coast Guard Marine Communications and Traffic Services radio systems.

== Resources ==
=== Air ===
The primary SAR air resource in the Halifax SRR is 413 Transport and Rescue Squadron located at 14 Wing Greenwood in Nova Scotia and 103 Search and Rescue Squadron located at 9 Wing Gander in Newfoundland and Labrador. 413 and 103 squadrons are equipped with the CH-149 Cormorant helicopter; 413 also flies CC-130 Hercules fixed wing aircraft. There are also resources available from the 444 Combat Support Squadron at 5 Wing Goose Bay in Newfoundland and Labrador; 444 flies the CH-146 Griffon.

Secondary resources include other RCAF aircraft such as CP-140 Aurora based at 14 Wing, as well as aircraft operated by the Civil Air Search and Rescue Association (CASARA) which is a national organization of volunteer pilots/aircraft owners who actively participate in aircraft searches and receive compensation for expenses incurred while training and in actual search and rescue operations.

=== Maritime ===
The Canadian Coast Guard provides the primary maritime resources to the federal SAR system, with vessels continually on offshore SAR patrols off the coasts of Nova Scotia and Newfoundland and Labrador. In addition to approximately 20 dedicated rescue cutters there are 11 seasonal inshore rescue boats.

Secondary resources include other CCG vessels and Royal Canadian Navy (RCN) warships, as well as vessels operated by the Canadian Coast Guard Auxiliary (CGA) which is a national organization of volunteer mariners/vessel owners who actively participate in maritime searches and receive compensation for their services.

=== Adjacent RCCs ===
JRCC Halifax works closely with, and shares resources freely with three adjacent RCCs:

- JRCC Trenton, to the west,
- RCC Boston to the southwest and RCC Norfolk to the south, and
- RCC Southampton to the east.

Canadian JRCCs share common air and marine radio circuits and all JRCCs are linked by hot line telephones. Canadian JRCC's are mutually connected through the Canadian SAR Mission Management System (SMMS) Computer Network. It is not unusual for UK, American or Canadian rescue units to respond to distress calls in each other's area when they are the closest available unit. Joint operating agreements and special customs procedures promote maximum cooperation that provides an optimal response to any distress.

=== MRSCs ===
The Halifax SRR includes two Maritime Rescue Sub Centres (MRSCs) which are staffed exclusively by CCG personnel for coordinating maritime rescues in support of JRCC Halifax within specific geographic areas. These include:

- MRSC St. John's (covers all maritime waters around Newfoundland and Labrador, including St. Pierre and Miquelon)
- MRSC Quebec (covers all maritime waters in southern Quebec - the Gulf of St. Lawrence and St. Lawrence River)

=== SARSAT ===
One of the most useful tools in the National Search and Rescue Program is the Cospas-Sarsat satellite surveillance system that was jointly founded in 1981 by Canada, USA, France and USSR. At present 18 countries participate. The Canadian system uses three earth stations - Edmonton, Churchill and Goose Bay, to monitor satellites in polar orbit. These satellites detect and locate air and marine emergency beacons, referred to as Electronic Location Transmitters (ELTs) and Electronic Position Indicating Radio Beacons (EPIRBs), which transmit on 121.5, 243.0 and 406.0 MHz. The resultant distress signals are relayed to the Canadian Mission Control Centre, co-located at JRCC Trenton (at CFB Trenton) and then routed to the appropriate JRCC for action.
