= Canadian Coast Guard =

Canadian government agency

- Garde côtière canadienne
- Heraldic badge of the Canadian Coast Guard
- Founded: January 26, 1962; 64 years ago
- Country: Canada
- Type: Special operating agency
- Role: Coast guard: Marine search and rescue; aids to navigation and waterways management; marine communications and traffic services; vessels of concern; icebreaking; marine pollution response
- Size: 6,700 employees (2025)
- Part of: Government of Canada; Department of National Defence
- Headquarters: Ottawa, Ontario
- Mottos: Saluti Primum, Auxilio Semper (Latin for 'Safety First, Service Always')
- Annual budget: $2.84 billion (2025-26)
- Website: www.canada.ca/en/canadian-coast-guard.html

Commanders
- Minister of National Defence: David McGuinty
- Deputy Minister: Christiane Fox
- Commissioner: Kevin Brosseau
- Deputy Commissioner (Programs): Marc Mes
- Deputy Commissioner (Shipbuilding and Material): Robert (Robb) Wight

Insignia
- Jack

- Racing stripe

- Corporate signature

The Canadian Coast Guard (CCG; French: Garde côtière canadienne; GCC) is a special operating agency responsible for marine search and rescue (SAR), navigation aids, marine communications and traffic services, icebreaking, and marine pollution response. Formed in 1962, the CCG is a civilian organization currently housed within the Department of National Defence (DND) and headquartered in Ottawa, Ontario. The CCG operates 119 vessels of varying sizes and 23 helicopters, along with a variety of smaller craft.

== Role and responsibility ==
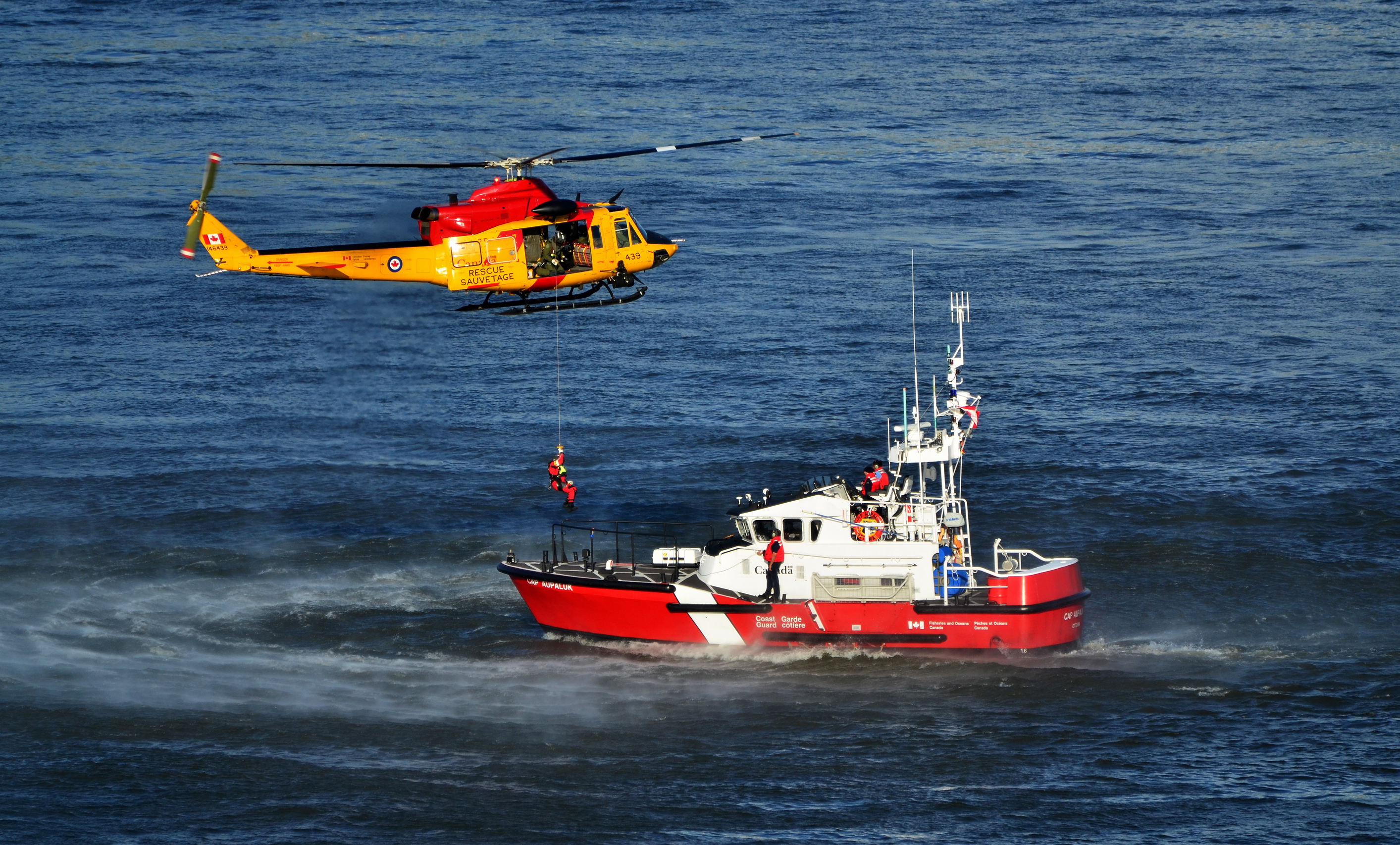
CCGS Cap Aupaluk assisting the Royal Canadian Air Force in a training exercise

Unlike armed coast guards of some other nations, the CCG is a government marine organization without naval or law enforcement responsibilities. Naval operations in Canada's maritime environment are exclusively the responsibility of the Royal Canadian Navy. Enforcement of Canada's maritime-related federal statutes may be carried out by peace officers serving with various federal, provincial or even municipal law enforcement agencies.

Although CCG personnel are neither a naval nor law enforcement force, they may operate CCG vessels in support of naval operations, or they may serve an operational role in the delivery of maritime law enforcement and security services in Canadian federal waters by providing a platform for personnel serving with one or more law enforcement agencies. The CCG's responsibility encompasses Canada's 202,080-kilometre-long (109,110 nmi; 125,570 mi) coastline. Its vessels and aircraft operate over an area of ocean and inland waters covering approximately 2.3 million square nautical miles (7.9 million square kilometres).

=== Mission and mandate ===
"Canadian Coast Guard services support government priorities and economic prosperity and contribute to the safety, accessibility and security of Canadian waters."

The CCG's mandate is stated in the Oceans Act and the Canada Shipping Act.

The Oceans Act gives the CCG responsibility for providing:

- aids to navigation;
- marine communications and traffic management services;
- icebreaking and ice-management services;
- channel maintenance;
- marine search and rescue;
- marine pollution response;
- support of other government departments, boards and agencies by providing ships, aircraft and other services; and
- security, including security patrols and the collection, analysis and disclosure of information or intelligence.

The Canada Shipping Act gives the minister powers, responsibilities and obligations concerning:

- aids to navigation;
- Sable Island;
- search and rescue;
- pollution response; and
- vessel traffic services.

== History ==
=== Predecessor agencies and formation (1867–1962) ===
Originally a variety of federal departments and even the navy performed the work which the CCG does today. Following Confederation in 1867, the federal government placed many of the responsibilities for maintaining aids to navigation (primarily lighthouses at the time), marine safety, and search and rescue under the Marine Service of the Department of Marine and Fisheries, with some responsibility for waterways resting with the Canal Branch of the Department of Railways and Canals.

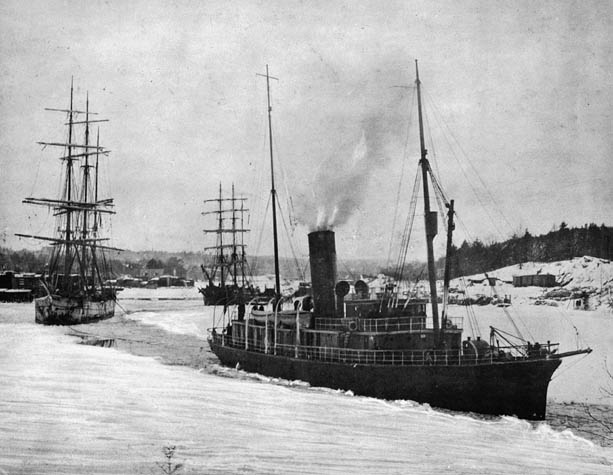
The Canadian government vessel CGS Stanley escorting two vessels, 1910.

Lifeboat stations had been established on the east and west coasts as part of the Canadian Lifesaving Service; the station at Sable Island being one of the first in the nation. On the Pacific coast, the service operated the Dominion Lifesaving Trail (now called the West Coast Trail) which provided a rural communications route for survivors of shipwrecks on the treacherous Pacific Ocean coast off Vancouver Island. These stations maintained, sometimes sporadically in the earliest days, pulling (rowed) lifeboats crewed by volunteers and eventually motorized lifeboats.

After the Department of Marine and Fisheries was split into separate departments, the Department of Marine continued to take responsibility for the federal government's coastal protection services. During the inter-war period, the Royal Canadian Navy also performed similar duties at a time when the navy was wavering on the point of becoming a civilian organization. Laws related to customs and revenue were enforced by the marine division of the Royal Canadian Mounted Police. A government reorganization in 1936 saw the Department of Marine and its Marine Service, along with several other government departments and agencies, folded into the new Department of Transport.

Following the Second World War, Canada experienced a major expansion in ocean commerce, culminating with the opening of the St. Lawrence Seaway in 1958. The shipping industry was changing throughout eastern Canada and required an expanded federal government role in the Great Lakes and the Atlantic coast, as well as an increased presence in the Arctic and Pacific coasts for sovereignty purposes. The government of Prime Minister John Diefenbaker decided to consolidate the duties of the Marine Service of the Department of Transport and on January 26, 1962, the Canadian Coast Guard was formed as a subsidiary of DOT. One of the more notable inheritances at the time of formation was the icebreaker Labrador, transferred from the Royal Canadian Navy.

=== Expansion years (1962–1990) ===
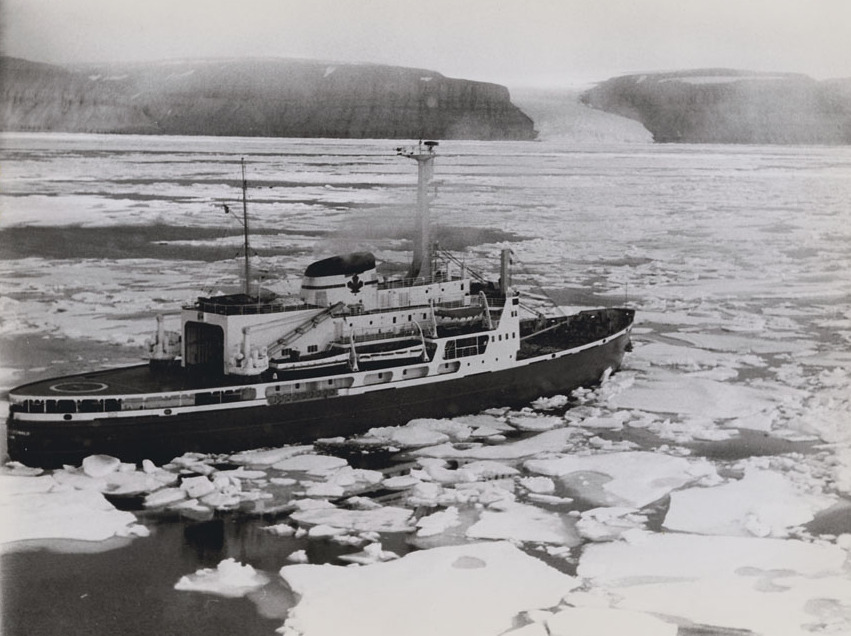
CCGS John A. Macdonald off Burnett Inlet, 1963

A period of expansion followed the creation of the CCG between the 1960s and the 1980s. The outdated ships the CCG inherited from the Marine Service were scheduled for replacement, along with dozens of new ships for the expanding role of the organization. Built under a complementary national shipbuilding policy which saw the CCG contracts go to Canadian shipyards, the new ships were delivered throughout this golden age of the organization.

In addition to expanded geographic responsibilities in the Great Lakes, the rise in coastal and ocean shipping ranged from new mining shipments such as Labrador iron ore, to increased cargo handling at the nation's major ports, and Arctic development and sovereignty patrols—all requiring additional ships and aircraft. The federal government also began to develop a series of CCG bases near major ports and shipping routes throughout southern Canada, for example Victoria, British Columbia, Dartmouth, Nova Scotia, and Parry Sound, Ontario.

The expansion of the CCG fleet required new navigation and engineering officers, as well as crewmembers. To meet the former requirement, in 1965 the Canadian Coast Guard College (CCGC) opened on the former navy base HMCS Protector at Point Edward, Nova Scotia. By the late 1970s, the college had outgrown the temporary navy facilities and a new campus was opened in the adjacent community of Westmount in 1981.

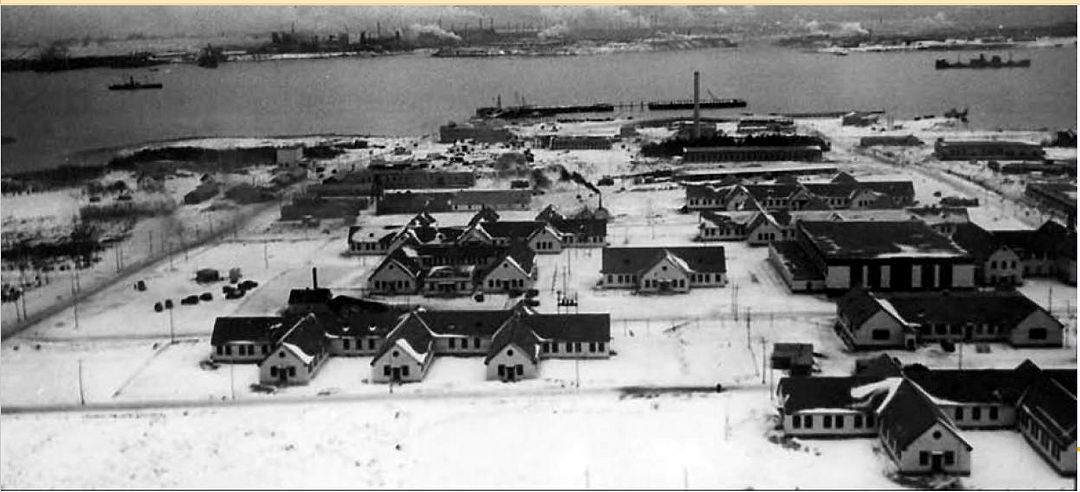
View of HMCS Protector facing east, 1943. The naval base later became the first site for the Canadian Coast Guard College.

During the mid-1980s, the long-standing disagreement between the U.S. and Canada over the legal status of the Northwest Passage came to a head after USCGC Polar Sea transited the passage in what were asserted by Canada to be Canadian waters and by the U.S. to be international waters. During the period of increased nationalism that followed this event, the Conservative administration of Brian Mulroney announced plans to build several enormous icebreakers, the Polar 8 class which would be used primarily for sovereignty patrols.

However, the proposed Polar 8 class was abandoned during the late 1980s as part of general government budget cuts; in their place, a program of vessel modernizations was instituted. Additional budget cuts to CCG in the mid-1990s following a change in government saw many of CCG's older vessels built during the 1960s and 1970s retired.

From its formation in 1962 until 1995, CCG was the responsibility of the Department of Transport. Both the department and CCG shared complementary responsibilities related to marine safety, whereby DOT had responsibility for implementing transportation policy, regulations and safety inspections, and CCG was operationally responsible for navigation safety and SAR, among others.

=== Budget cuts and bureaucratic oversight (1994–2005) ===
Following the 1995 Canadian federal budget, the federal government announced that it was transferring responsibility for the CCG from the Department of Transport to the Department of Fisheries and Oceans (DFO). The reason for placing CCG under DFO was ostensibly to achieve cost savings by amalgamating the two largest civilian vessel fleets within the federal government under a single department.

Arising out of this arrangement, the CCG became ultimately responsible for crewing, operating, and maintaining a larger fleet—both the original CCG fleet before 1995 of dedicated SAR vessels, Navaid tenders, and multi-purpose icebreakers along with DFO's smaller fleet of scientific research and fisheries enforcement vessels, all without any increase in budget—in fact the overall budget for CCG was decreased after absorbing the DFO patrol and scientific vessels.

There were serious stumbling blocks arising out of this reorganization, namely in the different management practices and differences in organizational culture at DFO, versus DOT. DFO is dedicated to conservation and protection of fish through enforcement whereas the CCG's primary focus is marine safety and SAR. There were valid concerns raised within CCG about reluctance on the part of the marine community to ask for assistance from CCG vessels since the CCG was being viewed as aligned with an enforcement department. In the early 2000s, the federal government began to investigate the possibility of remaking CCG as a separate agency, thereby not falling under a specific functional department and allowing more operational independence.

=== Special operating agency of the Department of Fisheries and Oceans (2005–2025) ===
In one of several reorganizations of federal departments and agencies following the swearing-in of Prime Minister Paul Martin's cabinet on December 12, 2003, several policy and regulatory responsibilities (including boating safety and navigable waters protection) were transferred from the CCG back to the Department of Transport to provide a single point of contact for issues related to marine safety regulation and security. However, the CCG maintained operational responsibility for some of these tasks.

The services offered by the CCG under this arrangement included:

- Icebreaking and Arctic sovereignty protection

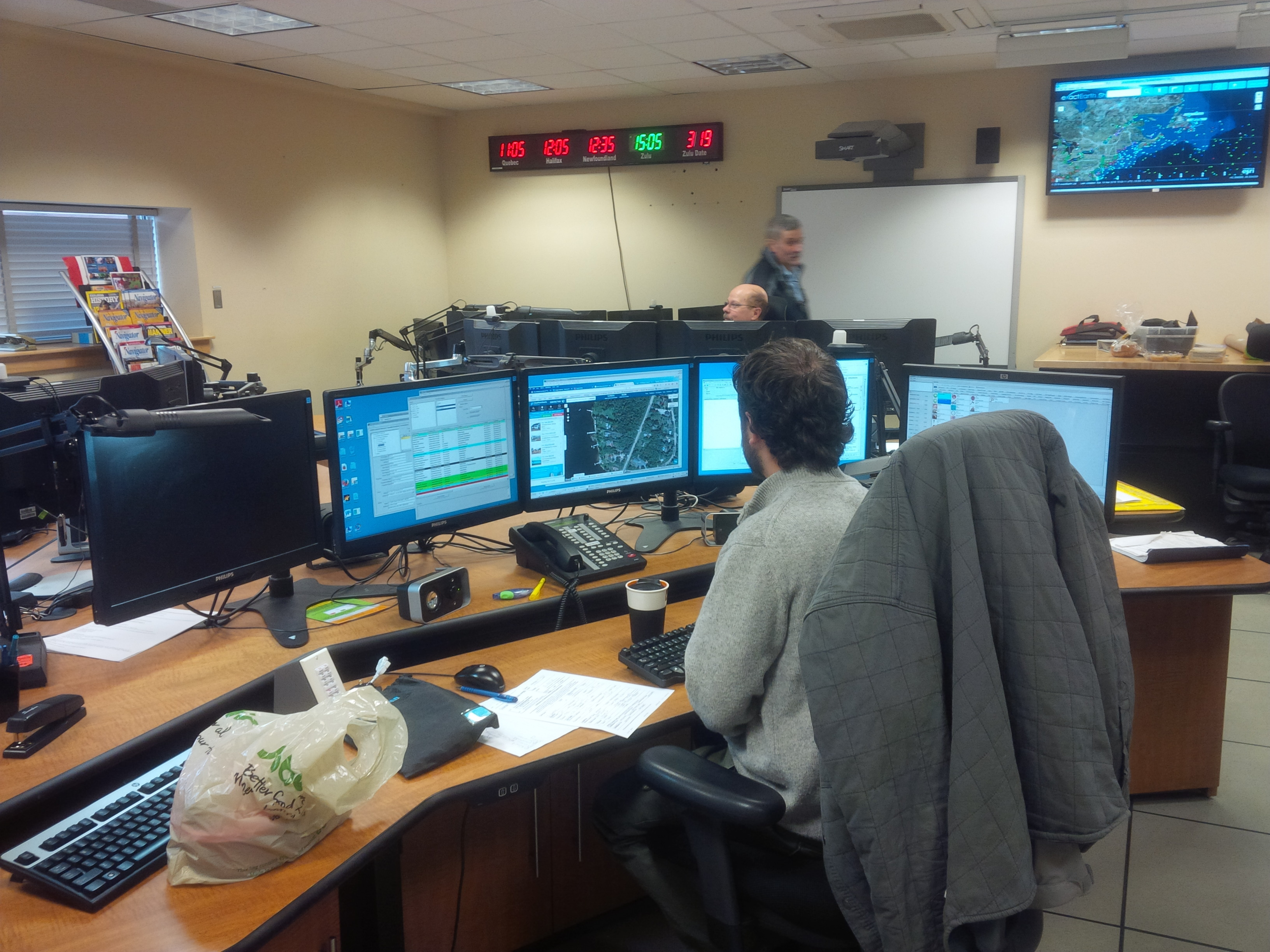
Inside Joint Rescue Coordination Centre Halifax, 2016. The rescue coordination centre is operated by the Canadian Coast Guard and the Royal Canadian Air Force.

- Marine search and rescue: primary marine SAR vessels, personnel to staff joint rescue coordination centres (JRCCs) trained and designated as maritime SAR co-ordinators per the Canada Shipping Act
- Marine security: monitor vessel movements within Canadian waters, coordinate information to other government departments and agencies regarding 96-hour pre-arrival notification from vessels per the Marine Transportation Security Act, personnel to staff marine security operations centres (MSOCs)
- Environmental response: spill containment and clean-up
- Marine navigation services including aids to navigation: buoy tending, light station keeping, beacon maintenance, publication of notices to mariners (NOTMAR) annually and monthly, and notices to shipping (NOTSHIP) as well as broadcasting safety notices to shipping over marine radio frequencies; and the publication of Radio Aids to Marine Navigation (RAMNav) and the List of Lights, Buoys & Fog Signals (Lights List)
- Maritime mobile safety services: marine radio communications, electronic aids to radio navigation systems (e.g. LORAN, Differential GPS)
- Vessel traffic services to co-ordinate vessel movement safety, monitoring vessel movements including 96-hour reporting protocol before vessels are permitted to enter Canadian waters
- Support to fisheries research (as a platform)
- Offshore, mid-shore and coastal fisheries enforcement (as a platform)
- Integrated border-enforcement teams (IBETs) with the Royal Canadian Mounted Police (RCMP) and Canada Border Services Agency (CBSA) (as a platform)
- Marine support to other federal government departments (as a platform)

On April 4, 2005, the Minister of Fisheries and Oceans designated the CCG as a "special operating agency"—the largest one in the federal government. Although the CCG still fell under the ministerial responsibility of the Minister of Fisheries and Oceans, it had more autonomy as it was not as tightly integrated within the department. All CCG bases, aids to navigation, vessels, aircraft, and personnel became wholly the responsibility of the Commissioner of the Canadian Coast Guard, who was of assistant deputy ministerial rank. The Commissioner, in turn, was supported by CCG headquarters, which developed a budget for the organization. The arrangement was not unlike the relationship of the RCMP, also headed by a commissioner, toward that organization's parent department, the Department of Public Safety.

The special operating agency reorganization was different from the past under both DOT and DFO, where regional directors general for these departments were responsible for CCG operations within their respective regions. This reportedly caused problems under DFO that did not occur under DOT. As a special operating agency of DFO, all operations of CCG were directed by the Commissioner, who reported directly to the deputy minister of DFO. Assistant commissioners were responsible for CCG operations within each region and they reported directly to the Commissioner. This management and financial flexibility was enhanced by an increased budget to permit the CCG to acquire new vessels and other assets to assist in its growing role in marine security.

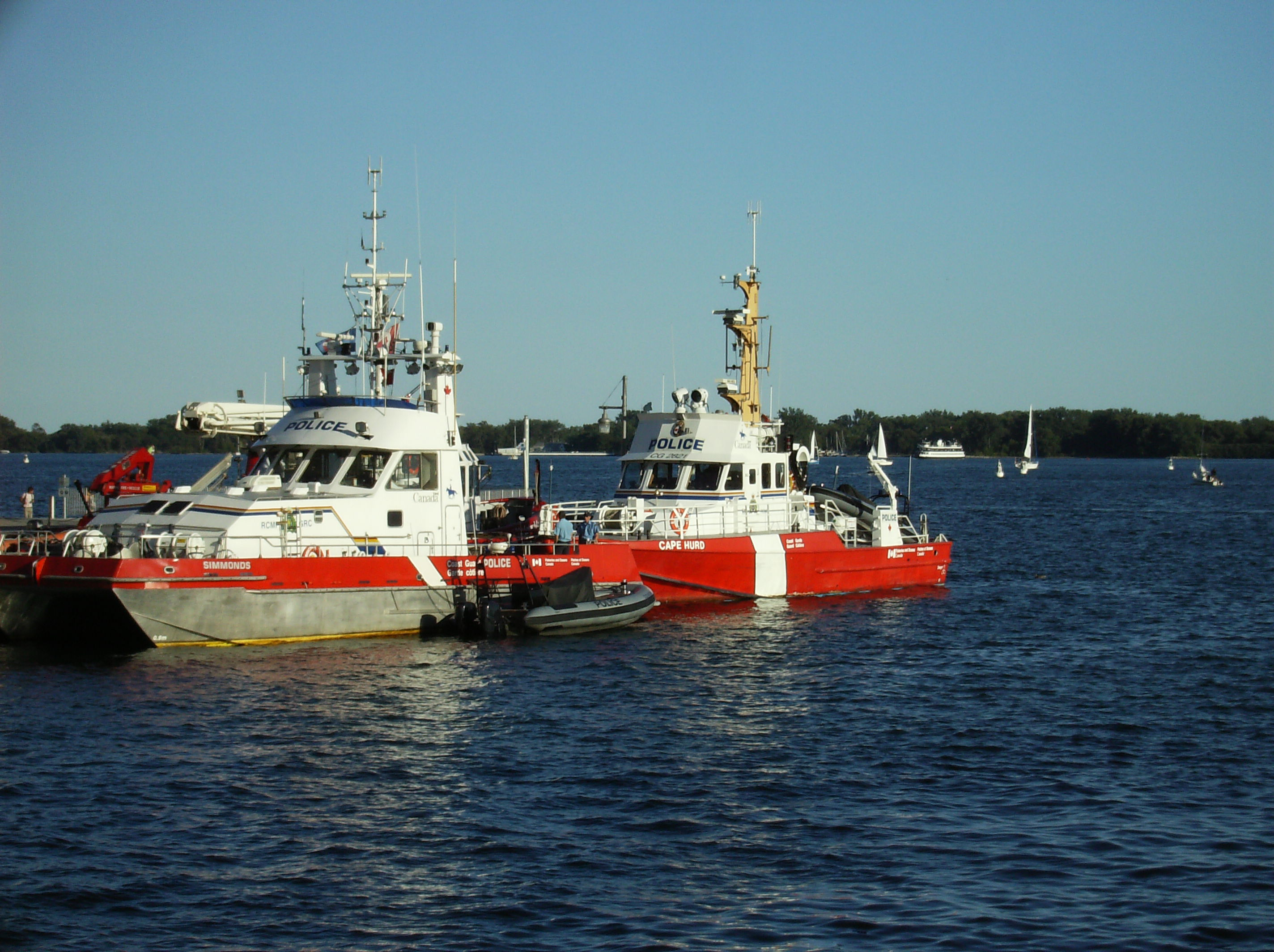
Two RCMP/Coast Guard vessels in Toronto harbour, 2007.

The CCG continued to provide vessels and crews to support the DFO's fisheries science, enforcement, conservation, and protection requirements. The changes resulting in the CCG becoming a special operating agency under DFO did not address some of the key concerns raised by an all-party Parliamentary committee investigating low morale among CCG employees following the transfer from DOT to DFO and budget cuts since 1995. This committee had recommended that the CCG become a separate agency under DOT and that its role be changed to that of an armed, paramilitary organization involved in maritime security by arming its vessels with deck guns, similar to the United States Coast Guard, and that employees be given peace officer status for enforcing federal laws on the oceans and Great Lakes. As a compromise, the CCG partnered with the RCMP and CBSA to create IBETs, which patrol Canadian waters along the Canada–United States border.

=== Fleet modernization ===
In the 1990s–2000s, CCG modernized part of its SAR fleet after ordering British Royal National Lifeboat Institution (RNLI)-designed Arun-class high-endurance lifeboat cutters for open coastal areas, and the USCG-designed 47-foot Motor Lifeboat (designated by CCG as the Cape class) as medium-endurance lifeboat cutters for the Great Lakes and more sheltered coastal areas. The CCG ordered five 47-foot (14.3 m) motor lifeboats in September 2009, to add to the 31 existing boats. New vessels delivered to the CCG from 2009 onward included the hovercraft CCGS Mamilossa and the near-shore fisheries research vessels CCGS Kelso and CCGS Viola M. Davidson.

Several major vessels have undergone extensive refits in recent decades, most notably CCGS Louis S. St-Laurent in place of procuring the Polar 8 class of icebreakers.

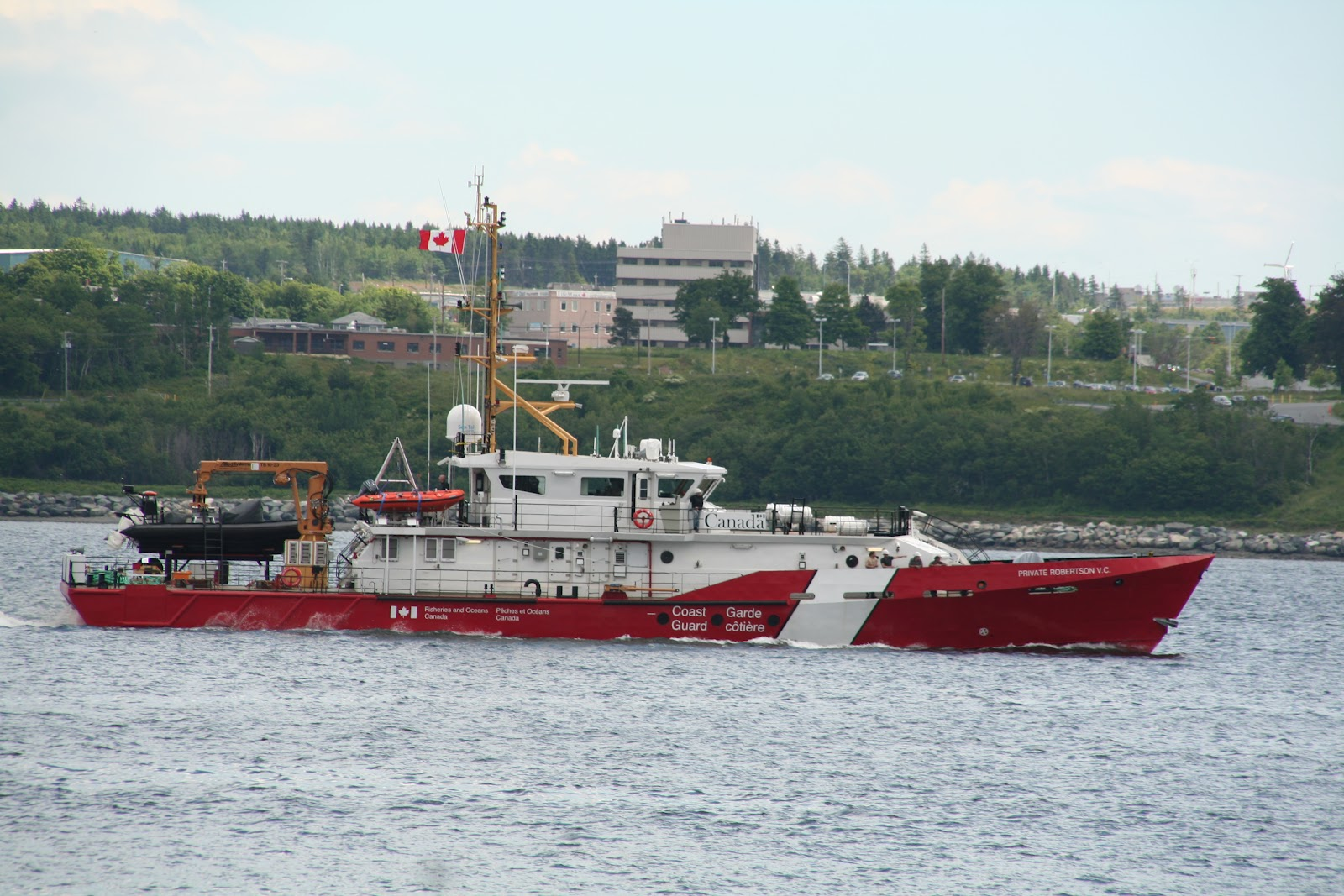
CCGS Private Robertson V.C. in Halifax Harbour, in 2012. The ship was put in service that year.

In the first decade of the 21st century, CCG announced plans for the Mid Shore Patrol Vessel Project (a class of nine vessels) as well as a "Polar"-class icebreaker – since named CCGS Arpatuuq – in addition to inshore and offshore fisheries science vessels and a new oceanographic research vessel as part of efforts to modernize the fleet.

In 2012, the Government of Canada announced procurement of 24 helicopters to replace the current fleet.

==== Modernizing the Coast Guard's icebreakers ====
The Coast Guard has acknowledged that it is not just Louis S. St. Laurent that is old, and needs replacing, all its icebreakers are old. Some critics have argued that with global warming, and the scramble for Arctic nations to document claims to a share of the Arctic Ocean seafloor, Canada lacked sufficient icebreakers. In 2018 the Coast Guard started to publicly search for existing large, capable icebreakers it could purchase. On August 13, 2018, the Coast Guard confirmed it would be buying and retrofitting three large, icebreaking, anchor-handling tugs, Tor Viking, Balder Viking and Vidar Viking from Viking Supply Ships.

On 22 May 2019, it was announced two more Harry DeWolf-class offshore patrol vessels will be built for the Canadian Coast Guard, in addition to the six being constructed for the Royal Canadian Navy. Additionally, $15.7B was announced for the production of 16 additional multi-purpose vessels.

=== Transfer to the Department of National Defence (2025 to the present) ===
On June 9, 2025, Prime Minister Mark Carney announced that the Canadian Coast Guard would receive funds for capital purchases that will count towards Canada spending 2 per cent of GDP on defence in accordance with the NATO target.

The Canadian Coast Guard was formally transferred to the Department of National Defence through an order-in-council on September 2, 2025. However, it remains a civilian special operating agency and has not been included in the command and control structure that governs the operations of the Royal Canadian Navy, Canadian Army, and Royal Canadian Air Force.

== Organizational structure ==
Canadian Coast Guard personnel speaking with attendees at an information and recruitment booth during the Marine Career Expo at The Shipyards in North Vancouver, British Columbia.

CCG's management and organizational structure reflects its quasi-military nature. The CCG agency supports several functional departments as outlined here:

Programs

- Fleet and Maritime Services Branch
- Response Branch
- Marine Navigation Programs Directorate

Operational Personnel Branch

Shipbuilding and Materiel

- Vessel Procurement Branch
- Integrated Technical Services Branch
- Aircraft Services Directorate

Planning, Engagement, and Priorities Branch

=== Quasi-military structure ===
The Canadian Coast Guard is a civilian organization that is managed and funded by the Department of National Defence. The enforcement of laws in Canada's territorial sea is the responsibility of Canada's federal police force, the Royal Canadian Mounted Police (RCMP) as all ocean waters in Canada are under federal (not provincial) jurisdiction. Saltwater fisheries enforcement is a specific responsibility of Fisheries and Oceans Canada's Fisheries Officers.

CCG does not have a conventional paramilitary rank structure; instead, its rank structure roughly approximates that of the civilian merchant marine.

In late October 2010 the Stephen Harper government tabled a report that recommended that arming Canadian Coast Guard icebreakers should be considered. Minister of Fisheries and Oceans Gail Shea presented the government's response to a December 2009 report from the Senate's Fisheries Committee, entitled "Controlling Canada's Arctic Waters: Role of the Canadian Coast Guard." The Senate Committee's report had also recommended arming Canadian Coast Guard vessels in the Arctic. Randy Boswell, of the Canwest News Service quoted Michael Byers, an expert on the law of the sea, who used the phrase "quiet authority of a deck-mounted gun".

=== Operational regions ===
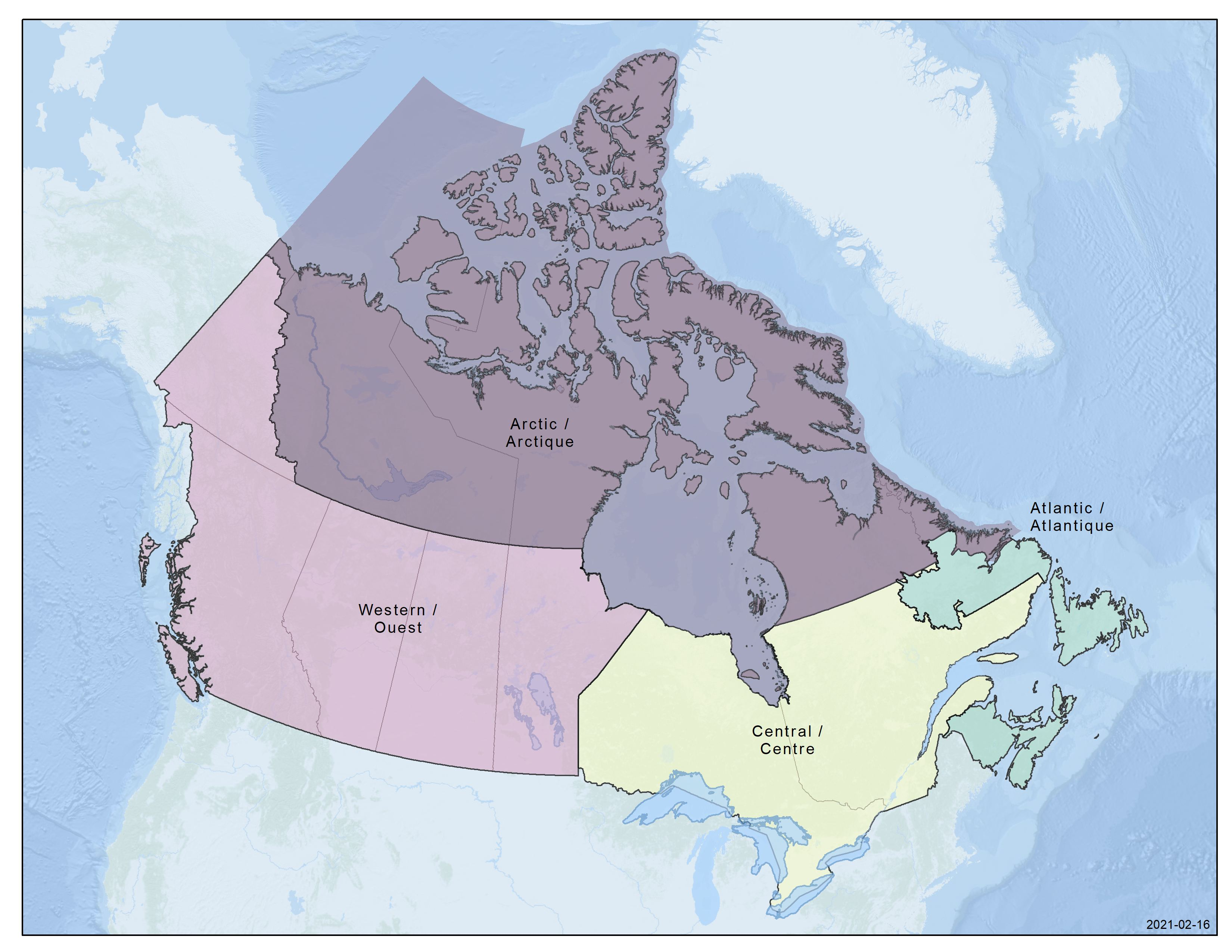
Map showing the operating regions of the Canadian Coast Guard (left to right): Western region (BC, Alberta, Saskatchewan, Manitoba, Yukon minus the Yukon North Slope), Arctic region (Yukon, Northwest Territories, Nunavut, Hudson Bay and James Bay), Central region (Ontario and Quebec) and Atlantic region (Newfoundland and Labrador, Nova Scotia, New Brunswick and Prince Edward Island).

CCG as a whole is divided into four operational regions: Atlantic, Central, Western, and Arctic. The newest region, the Arctic, was established in October 2018. Previously responsibility for the Arctic areas of Canada was split between the three existing regions. The new unit includes a mandate which ensures increased support for Inuit communities, including search and rescue, icebreaking and for community resupply. The new region is headquartered in Yellowknife.

=== Auxiliary ===
The CCG does not have a "reserve" element. There is a Canadian Coast Guard Auxiliary (CCGA) which is a separate non-profit organization composed of some 5,000 civilian volunteers across Canada who support search and rescue activities. The CCGA, formerly the Canadian Marine Rescue Auxiliary (CMRA), is made up of volunteer recreational boaters and commercial fishermen who assist CCG with search and rescue as well as boating safety education. CCGA members who assist in SAR operations have their vessel insurance covered by CCG, as well as any fuel and operating costs associated with a particular tasking. The CCGA enables the CCG to provide marine SAR coverage in many isolated areas of Canada's coastlines without having to maintain an active base and/or vessels in those areas.

=== Commissioner ===
The head of CCG is called the "Commissioner of the Canadian Coast Guard". The rank of "Commissioner" is used in other Canadian federal agencies, such as the RCMP. However, rank and associated insignia are viewed differently in the CCG than in the Royal Canadian Navy. The commissioner is level 0.5 within the Department of National Defence's leadership hierarchy, a role equivalent to an associate deputy minister or the vice chief of the defence staff.

Commissioner	Term
Kevin Brosseau	2026 – present
Mario Pelletier	December 6, 2019 – 2026 (first commissioner to have graduated from the Canadian Coast Guard College)
Jeffery Hutchinson	March 13, 2017 – December 6, 2019
Jody Thomas	January 1, 2015 – March 13, 2017 (first female commissioner)
Marc Grégoire	June 28, 2010 – December 31, 2014
George Da Pont	May 9, 2006 – June 27, 2010
John Adams	July 1, 1998 – May 8, 2006
David B. Watters	January 1, 1997 – June 30, 1998
John F. Thomas	July 1, 1993 – December 31, 1996
Ranald A. Quail	January 1, 1984 – June 30, 1993
Andrew L. Collier	July 1, 1980 – December 31, 1983
William A. O'Neil	January 1, 1975 – June 30, 1980

== Facilities ==
=== Bases and stations ===
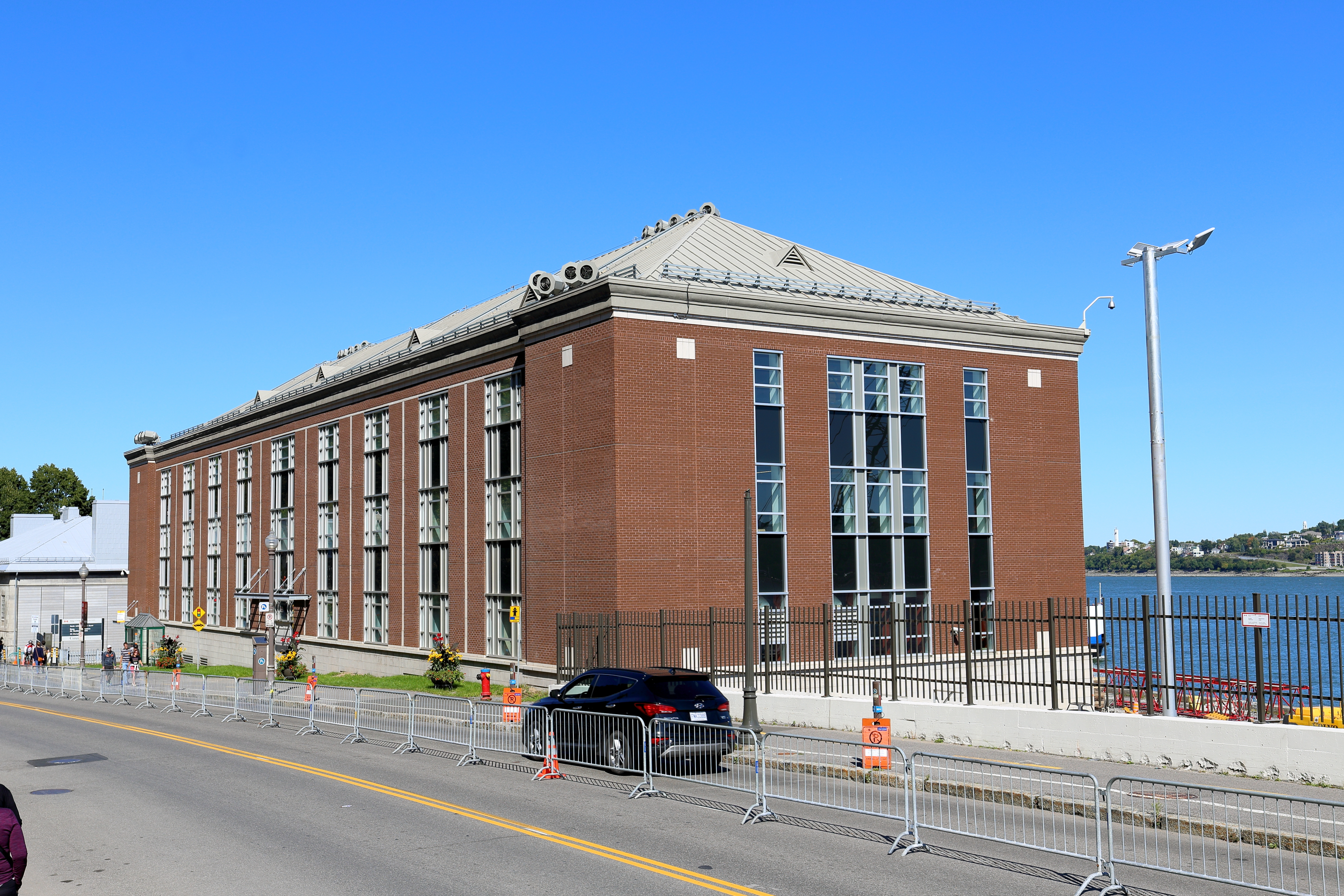
CCG Base Quebec building in Quebec City, 2019

=== Lighthouses ===
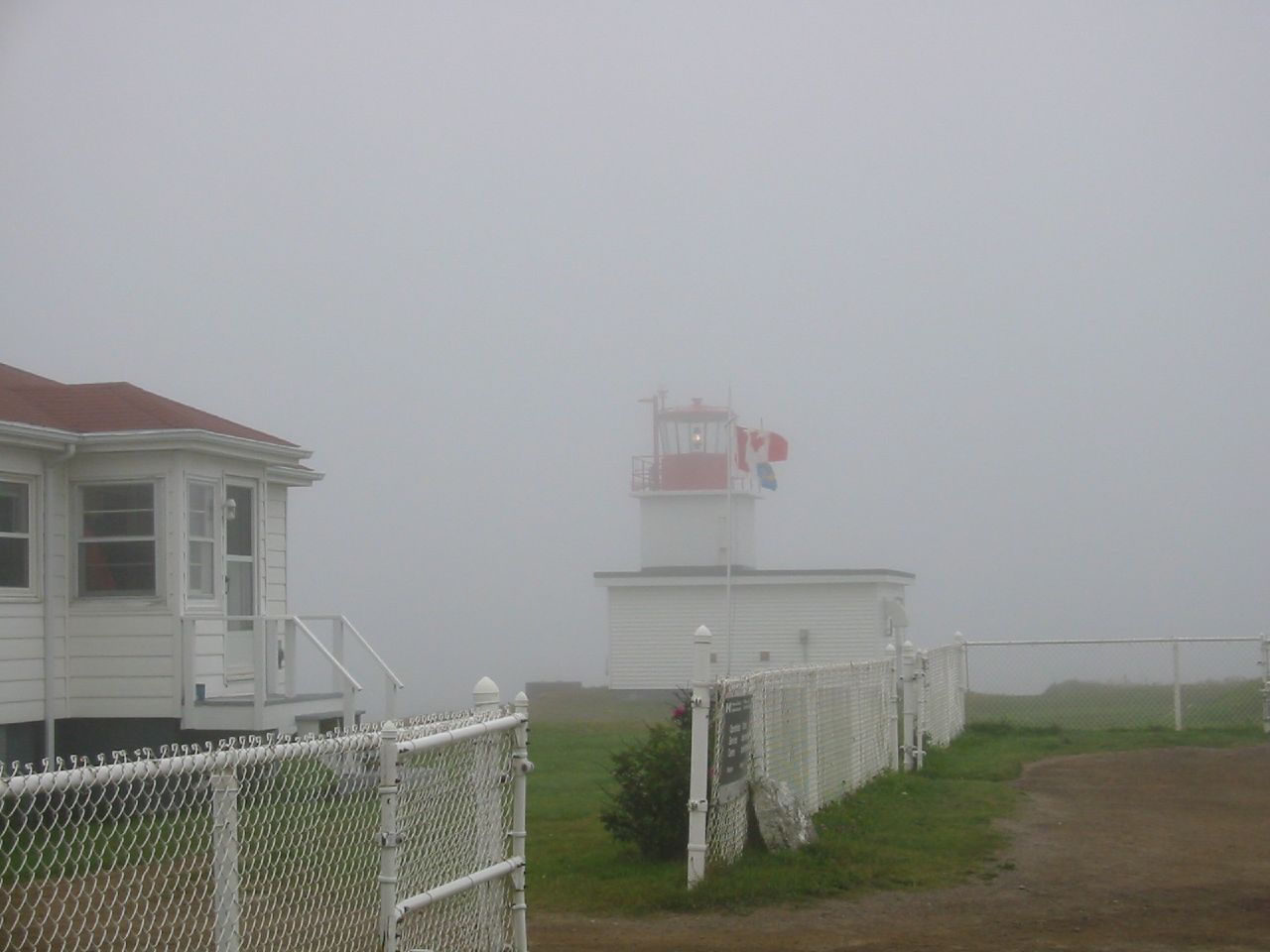
Brier Island coast guard station and lighthouse, 2003

CCG operates one of the largest networks of navigational buoys, lighthouses and foghorns in the world. These facilities assist marine navigation on the Atlantic, Pacific and Arctic coasts as well as selected inland waterways. CCG represents Canada at the International Association of Marine Aids to Navigation and Lighthouse Authorities (IALA).

CCG completed a large-scale program of lighthouse automation and de-staffing which began in 1968 and was largely completed in the 1990s. The result of this program saw the automation of all lighthouses and the removal of light keepers except for a handful of stations in British Columbia, Newfoundland and Labrador and New Brunswick.

Budget cuts and technological changes in the marine shipping industry, such as the increased use of GPS, electronic navigation charts and the Global Maritime Distress Safety System, has led CCG to undertake several service reviews for aids to navigation in recent decades. Such reviews have resulted in the further decommissioning of buoys and shore-based light stations as well as a dramatic reduction in the number of foghorns.

Canadian lightkeepers were notified September 1, 2009 that upper management was once again commencing the de-staffing process. The first round, to be completed before the end of the fiscal year, was to include Trial Island, Entrance Island, Cape Mudge and Dryad Point. The second round included Green Island, Addenbroke, Carmanah Point, Pachena Pt and Chrome Island. The decision was taken without input or consultation from the public or user-groups in spite of the fact that during the last round of de-staffing the public and user-groups spoke vocally against cuts to this service. Once again a large outcry forced Minister of Fisheries Gail Shea to respond and on September 30, 2009, she suspended the de-staffing process pending a review of services lightkeepers provide.

=== Historic facilities ===
The Department of Fisheries and Oceans, on behalf of the Canadian Coast Guard, is the custodian of many significant heritage buildings, including the oldest lighthouse in North America, the Sambro Island Lighthouse. The department has selectively maintained some heritage lighthouses and permitted some alternative use of its historic structures. However, many historic buildings have been neglected and the department has been accused of ignoring and abandoning even federally recognized buildings. Critics have pointed out that the department has lagged far behind other nations such as the United States in preserving its historic lighthouses. These concerns have led community groups and heritage building advocates to promote the Heritage Lighthouse Protection Act in the Canadian Parliament.

== Equipment ==
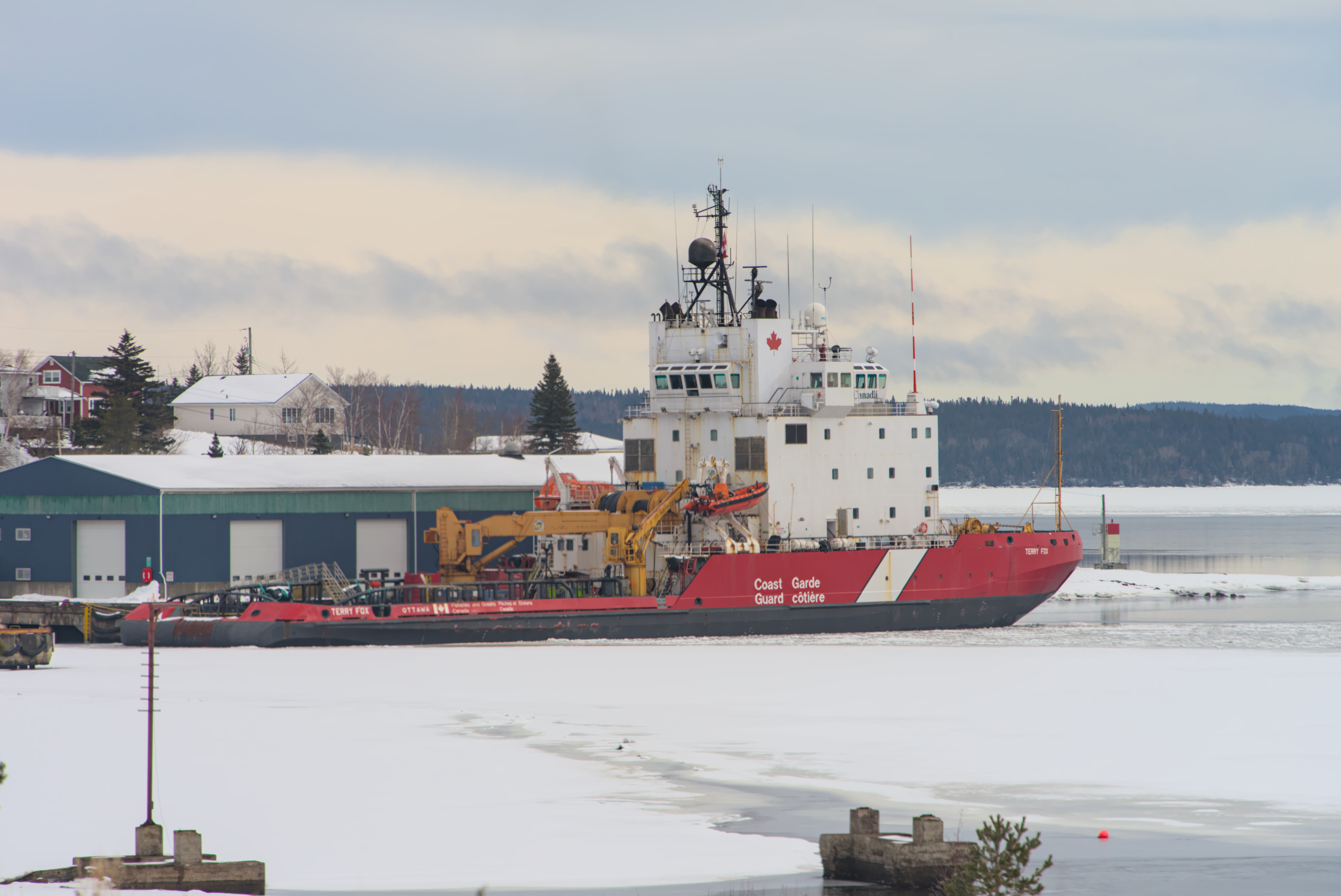
CCGS Terry Fox is one of two heavy icebreakers used by the Canadian Coast Guard.

== Navigational aid and services ==
The Canadian Coast Guard produces the Notice to Mariners (NOTMAR) publication which informs mariners of important navigational safety matters affecting Canadian waters. This electronic publication is published on a monthly basis and can be downloaded from the Notices to Mariners website. The information in the Notice to Mariners is formatted to simplify the correction of paper charts and navigational publications published by the Canadian Hydrographic Service.

== Rank insignia and badges ==
=== Epaulettes ===
Military epaulettes are used to represent ranks. In the CCG they represent levels of responsibility and commensurate salary levels. The Canadian Coast Guard Auxiliary epaulettes are similar except they use silver braid to distinguish them from the Canadian Coast Guard.

Canadian Coast Guard ranks and insignia
Rank	Commissioner	Deputy commissioner	Assistant commissioner	Officer Grade 13	Officer Grade 12	Officer Grade 11	Officer Grade 10	Officer Grade 09	Officer Grade 08	Officer Grade 07	Officer Grade 06	Officer Grade 05	Officer Grade 04	Officer Grade 03	Officer Grade 02	Cadet 4th year	Cadet 3rd year	Cadet 2nd year	Cadet 1st year
Cuff insignia																			
Common rank name	Commissioner	Deputy commissioner	Assistant commissioner / director general	Captain / director				Superintendent			Deputy superintendent		Officer/specialist			Cadet			
Common rank name	Commissaire	Sous commissaire	Commissaire adjoint / directeur général	Capitaine / directeur				Surintendant			Surintendant adjoint		Officier			Cadet			

Branch is denoted by coloured cloth between the gold braid. Deck officers, helicopter pilots, hovercraft pilots, JRCC/MRSC marine SAR controllers, and officers at the captain- / director-level and above do not wear any distinctive cloth.

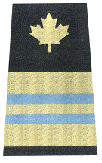
Training, royal blue

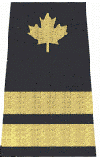
Electrical and Electronic, dark green

Engineer, purple

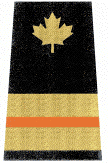
Incident Management and Vessels of Concern, orange

Logistics and Supply, white

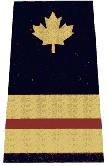
Medical, maroon

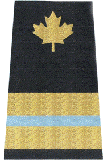
Meteorological, light blue

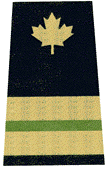
Radio, emerald green

=== Auxiliary epaulettes ===
Canadian Coast Guard Auxiliary ranks and insignia
Epaulette and cuff insignia										
Rank	National president	President	Vice president	Director	Alternate director; Advisor; District training officer; District prevention officer	Unit leader	Alternate unit leader	Unit training officer Unit prevention officer	Employee	Member
Rank	Président national	Président	Vice-président	Directeur	Directeur suppléant	Chef d'unité	Chef d'unité suppléant	Agent de formation d'unité/Agent de prévention d'unité		

=== Cap badges ===
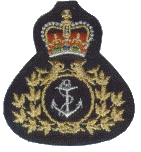
Officer

Petty officer

Crew

=== Qualification insignia ===
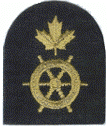
Deck

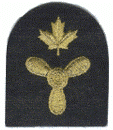
Engine room

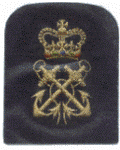
Petty officer

Rescue specialist

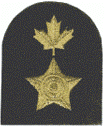
Supply

=== Medals, awards, and long service pins ===
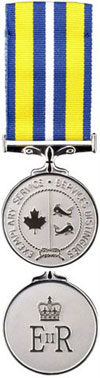
Exemplary Service Medal

Commissioner's Commendation

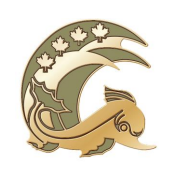
Command at Sea Rosette Large Ship (33m or larger)

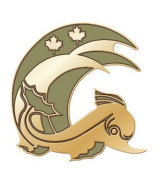
Command at Sea Rosette Small Ship (12m to 33m)

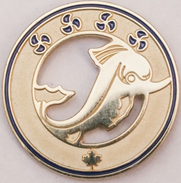
Chief Engineer at Sea Rosette Large Ship (33m or larger)

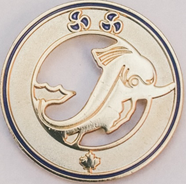
Chief Engineer at Sea Rosette Small Ship (12m to 33m)

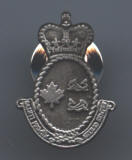
10 Year Long Service Pin

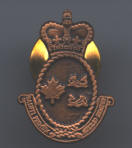
15 Year Long Service Pin

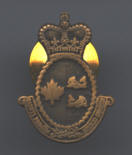
20 Year Long Service Pin

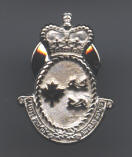
25 Year Long Service Pin

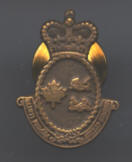
30 Year Long Service Pin

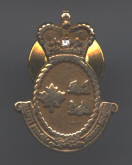
35 Year Long Service Pin

== Insignias and other representations ==
Coast Guard jack

Flag of the Honorary Chief Commissioner

As a special operating agency of the Government of Canada, the CCG uses generic identifiers imposed by the Federal Identity Program. However, the CCG is one of several federal departments and agencies (primarily those involved with law enforcement, security, or having a regulatory function) that have been granted heraldic symbols.

The CCG badge was originally approved in 1962. Blue symbolizes water, white represents ice, and dolphins are considered a friend of mariners. The Latin motto Saluti Primum, Auxilio Semper translates as "Safety First, Service Always".

In addition to the Coast Guard jack, distinctive flags have been approved for use by senior CCG officials, including the Honorary Chief Commissioner (the Governor General) and the Minister of Transport. The Canadian Coast Guard Auxiliary was granted a flag and badge by the Canadian Heraldic Authority in 2012.

== See also ==
- National Search and Rescue Program
- North Pacific Coast Guard Agencies Forum
- Joint Rescue Coordination Centre Trenton
- Joint Rescue Coordination Centre Halifax
- Joint Rescue Coordination Centre Victoria
- Maritime Rescue Sub-Centre St. John's
- Maritime Rescue Sub-Centre Quebec
