= Rescue coordination centre =

Facility for coordinating search and rescue operations

A rescue co-ordination centre (RCC) is a primary search and rescue (SAR) facility in a country that is staffed by supervisory personnel and equipped for co-ordinating and controlling search and rescue operations.

RCCs are responsible for a geographic area, known as a "search and rescue region of responsibility" (SRR). SRRs are designated by the International Maritime Organization (IMO) and the International Civil Aviation Organization (ICAO). RCCs are operated unilaterally by personnel of a single military service (e.g. an air force, or a navy) or a single civilian service (e.g. a national police force, or a coast guard).

== Genres ==
A Joint Rescue Co-ordination Centre (JRCC) is a special type of RCC that is often operated by personnel from multiple military services, civilian services, or a combination of military and/or civilian services. A JRCC will oversee SAR operations for a variety of environments, both on land and at sea.

A Maritime Rescue Coordination Centre (MRCC) is a type of RCC dedicated exclusively to organising search and rescue in a maritime environment.

A Maritime Rescue Sub-Centre (MRSC) is a special type of RCC which operates almost identically to an MRCC but on a smaller scale, usually dictated by a specific environment within which it operates. An MRSC acts as a satellite center to an MRCC or JRCC and is operated to handle the workload for a particular geographic area within the SRR.

== Applications ==
- United States - United States Coast Guard and United States Air Force are partners in Joint Rescue Co-ordination Centres under the National Search and Rescue Plan.
- Canada - Canadian Coast Guard and Canadian Forces Search and Rescue (Royal Canadian Air Force and Royal Canadian Navy) are partners in Joint Rescue Co-ordination Centres; CCG operates Maritime Rescue Sub-Centres to offload work from JRCC

== Worldwide centers ==
=== Europe ===
- Civil Maritime Rescue Coordination Centre (CMRCC), Italy
- Cyprus Joint Rescue Coordination Center, Cyprus
- Joint Rescue Coordination Centre of Southern Norway, Sola, Norway
- Joint Rescue Coordination Centre, Iceland
- Joint Rescue Center Gothenburg, Gothenburg, Sweden
- Joint Rescue Coordination Center Den Helder, Den Helder, The Netherlands
- Joint Rescue Coordination Center UK, Fareham, United Kingdom
- Marine Rescue Coordination Center Bremen, Germany
- Maritime Rescue and Coordination Center Rome, Italy

=== Africa ===
- South African Maritime Safety Authority

=== Asia ===
- Hong Kong Maritime Rescue Co-ordination Centre
- Sri Lanka Maritime Rescue Coordinating Centre
- Mumbai Maritime Rescue Coordination Centre
- Chennai Maritime Rescue Coordination Centre
- Dhaka Maritime Rescue Coordination Centre
- Port Blair Maritime Rescue Coordination Centre

=== Oceania ===
- Joint Rescue Coordination Center Honolulu
- Australian Maritime Safety Authority's Joint Rescue Coordination Centre, Canberra
- Auckland Marine Rescue Centre, Auckland, New Zealand

=== North America ===
- Air Force Rescue Coordination Center (United States)
- Joint Rescue Coordination Centre Victoria, Victoria, Canada
- Joint Rescue Coordination Centre Halifax, Halifax, Canada
- Joint Rescue Coordination Centre Trenton, Astra, Canada

=== South America ===
- Marine Rescue Coordination Center Chile
  - MRCC Iquique
  - MRCC Puerto Montt
  - MRCC Punta Arenas (Cobrem Par)
  - MRCC Talcahuano
  - MRCC Valparaiso
- JRCC Curaçao, Curaçao
- MRCC La Guaira, Venezuela
