= Joint Rescue Coordination Centre Trenton =

The Joint Rescue Coordination Centre Trenton (JRCC Trenton) is a rescue coordination centre operated by the Royal Canadian Air Force (RCAF) and the Canadian Coast Guard (CCG). It is located on CFB Trenton in Astra, Ontario near Quinte West.

JRCC Trenton is responsible for coordinating the Search and Rescue (SAR) response to air and marine incidents within the Trenton Search and Rescue Region (SRR). This region covers the majority of the onshore, offshore and territorial waters in the Canadian Arctic including the entirety of the Northwest Territories and most of Nunavut except for the southern half of Baffin Island (70° north latitude) which is part of Halifax SRR. It also includes the western half of Quebec and the entirety of the provinces of Ontario, Manitoba, Saskatchewan, and Alberta. This area measures 11 million km^{2} of which approximately 30% is water (including Hudson Bay and the Great Lakes).

As a secondary role, JRCC Trenton coordinates requests by other levels of government for federal SAR resources. These secondary request are commonly made for humanitarian reasons that fall within provincial or municipal jurisdiction (e.g. searching for missing hunters, hoisting injured hikers and medical evacuation when civilian agencies are unable due to weather or location).

== Mission ==
"The national search and rescue (SAR) objective is to prevent loss of life and injury through search and rescue alerting, responding and aiding activities using public and private resources."

JRCC Trenton coordinates and controls Search and Rescue Units (SRUs) within its area of responsibility. The centre serves as a communications hub and primary point of contact for the coordination and direction of rescue units and on-scene commanders in order to meet the national objective in the safest and most effective manner possible.

AIRCOM also operates the Canadian Mission Control Centre (CMCC) from JRCC Trenton. CMCC is tasked with monitoring the Cospas-Sarsat system that detects transmissions from emergency locating beacons on aircraft or marine vessels in distress through Canada's search and rescue area of responsibility.

== Command and control ==
The Minister of National Defence has overall responsibility for the operation of the coordinated federal SAR system with primary (full-time) SAR resources provided by the Canadian Armed Forces and Department of Fisheries and Oceans. Within the Canadian Forces, SAR policy and procedures are the responsibility of Canadian Joint Operations Command with each JRCC being operationally responsible to the senior military officer in their region. JRCC Trenton is responsible to the Commander of Joint Task Force (Central) but also straddles the jurisdiction of JTF (East), JTF (West), and JTF (North).

== Personnel ==
JRCC Trenton is staffed by personnel from the RCAF and CCG 24 hours a day, year-round. Duty staff are

- two Maritime SAR Co-ordinators commonly referred to as the "marine controllers" (experienced CCG officers),
- one Assistant Maritime SAR Co-ordinator or "marine assistant" (experienced CCG officer),
- one Aeronautical SAR Co-ordinator commonly referred to as the "air controller" (experienced RCAF pilot or navigator); and
- one Assistant Aeronautical SAR Co-ordinator or "air assistant" (experienced RCAF NCM air crew (FE/SAR Tech), air traffic controller, or air weapon controller).

Air and Marine controllers are collectively called "mission coordinators". All JRCC personnel function together as a team to ensure that response to distress incidents is co-ordinated effectively.

== Location ==
JRCC Trenton is located on CFB Trenton in Trenton, Ontario. JRCC Trenton is connected with the Canadian Mission Control Centre (CMCC), Nav Canada, and the Canadian Coast Guard Marine Communications and Traffic Services radio systems.

== Resources ==
=== Air ===
The primary SAR air resource in the Trenton SRR is 424 Transport and Rescue Squadron, based at 8 Wing Trenton, and 435 Transport and Rescue Squadron, based at 17 Wing Winnipeg. 424 squadron is equipped with the CH-146 Griffon helicopter and the CC-130 Hercules fixed wing aircraft whereas 435 squadron is equipped with the CC-130 Hercules. There are also resources available from 417 Combat Support Squadron, based at 4 Wing Cold Lake, and 439 Combat Support Squadron, based at 3 Wing Bagotville; both squadrons fly the CH-146 Griffon configured in the combat search and rescue role.

Secondary resources include the Civil Air Search and Rescue Association (CASARA) which is a national organization of volunteers, pilots and aircraft owners as well as to those who wish to receive training as spotters and navigators. CASARA members actively participate in aircraft searches and are reimbursed for search related expenses.

=== Marine ===
The Canadian Coast Guard provides the primary marine resources to the federal SAR system, with dedicated rescue cutters and seasonal inshore rescue boats stationed in the Great Lakes and St. Lawrence Seaway. A variety of secondary SAR vessels including other CCG vessels and occasionally Royal Canadian Navy (RCN) warships are available in Arctic waters during summer operations.

Secondary resources include the Canadian Coast Guard Auxiliary (CGA) which is a national organization of volunteer mariners/vessel owners who actively participate in marine searches and receive compensation for their services.

=== Adjacent RCCs ===
JRCC Trenton works closely with, and shares resources freely with three adjacent RCCs:

- Joint Rescue Coordination Centre Halifax to the east
- Joint Rescue Coordination Centre Victoria to the west
- United States Air Force Rescue Coordination Center to the south

The Canadian JRCCs share common air and marine radio circuits and are linked by hot line telephones as well as a common computer network named the Canadian SAR Mission Management System (SMMS). It is not unusual for American or Canadian rescue units to respond to distress calls in each country's jurisdiction (SAR area of responsibility - SRR) when they are the closest available unit. Joint operating agreements and special customs procedures promote maximum cooperation that provides an optimal response to any distress.

=== MRSCs ===
The Trenton SRR straddles part of the territory covered by Maritime Rescue Sub-Centre Quebec. MRSC Quebec is staffed exclusively by CCG personnel for coordinating marine rescues in support of JRCC Trenton within all marine waters in southern Quebec, namely the upper St. Lawrence River and St. Lawrence Seaway, the Ottawa River, the Richelieu River and the Canadian part of Lake Champlain.

=== SARSAT ===
One of the most useful tools in the National Search and Rescue Program is the Cospas-Sarsat satellite surveillance system that was jointly founded in 1981 by Canada, USA, France and USSR. At present 18 countries participate. The Canadian system uses three earth stations - Edmonton, Churchill and Goose Bay, to monitor satellites in polar orbit. These satellites detect and locate air and marine emergency beacons, referred to as Electronic Location Transmitters (ELTs) and Electronic Position Indicating Radio Beacons (EPIRBs), which transmit on 121.5, 243.0 and 406.0 MHz. The resultant distress signals are relayed to the Canadian Mission Control Centre, co-located at JRCC Trenton and then routed to the appropriate JRCC for action.
