= Civil Air Search and Rescue Association =

Canadian volunteer association

The Civil Air Search and Rescue Association or CASARA, is a Canada-wide volunteer aviation association dedicated to the promotion of aviation safety, and to the provision of air search support services to Canada's National Search and Rescue Program. The association began in 1986 and is funded by the Department of National Defence.

Membership is open to private aircraft owners and pilots, as well as to those who wish to receive training as spotters (air observers), navigators, and ground team members. CASARA members receive training in fields such as aviation safety, meteorology, survival awareness and electronic search techniques and procedures.

CASARA is a civilian organization which receives funding from the Canadian Armed Forces. CASARA assists the Royal Canadian Air Force in carrying out its aeronautical search and rescue mandate by providing trained spotters for military aircraft; by providing its own search aircraft and crews; and by providing ground teams that specialize in locating emergency beacons.

CASARA applies its federal funding to offset training costs, and is also compensated for expenses incurred during actual search and rescue operations. Many CASARA organizations also have arrangements with provincial and territorial search and rescue authorities to provide air resources in support of ground and inland water search operations.

== See also ==
- Canadian Coast Guard Auxiliary
