= Joint Rescue Coordination Centre Victoria =

Establishment in Canada

The Joint Rescue Coordination Centre Victoria (JRCC Victoria) is a rescue coordination centre operated by the 1 Canadian Air Division (Canadian Armed Forces) and staffed by personnel of the Royal Canadian Air Force (RCAF) and the Canadian Coast Guard (CCG).

JRCC Victoria is responsible for coordinating the Search and Rescue (SAR) response to air and marine incidents within the Victoria Search and Rescue Region (SRR). This region includes the land masses of British Columbia and Yukon, as well as the adjacent marine waters of British Columbia. As a secondary role, JRCC Victoria coordinates requests by other levels of government for federal SAR resources. These secondary requests are commonly made for humanitarian reasons that fall within provincial or municipal jurisdiction (e.g., searching for missing hunters, hoisting injured hikers and medical evacuation when civilian agencies are unable due to weather or location).

== Mission ==
"The national search and rescue (SAR) objective is to prevent loss of life and injury through search and rescue alerting, responding and aiding activities using public and private resources."

JRCC Victoria coordinates and controls Search and Rescue Units (SRUs) within its area of responsibility. The centre serves as a communications hub and primary point of contact for the coordination and direction of rescue units and on-scene commanders in order to meet the national objective in the safest and most effective manner possible.

== Command and control ==
The Minister of National Defence (Canada) has overall responsibility for the operation of the coordinated federal SAR system with primary (full-time) SAR resources provided by the Canadian Forces and Department of Fisheries and Oceans. Within the Canadian Forces, SAR policy and procedures are a Search and Rescue Secretariat responsibility with each JRCC being operationally responsible to the senior military officer in their region. JRCC Victoria is responsible also to the Commander of Maritime Forces Pacific/Joint Task Force (Pacific).

== Personnel ==
JRCC Victoria is staffed by personnel from the Royal Canadian Air Force (RCAF)/Canadian Forces and the Canadian Coast Guard (CCG) 24 hours a day, year-round. Duty staff consists of:

- Two Maritime Coordinators commonly referred to as the "Marine Coordinator" (experienced CCG officers)
- One Aeronautical Coordinator commonly referred to as the "Air Coordinator" (experienced RCAF Pilot or Air Combat Systems Officer)
- One Assistant Aeronautical Coordinator or "Air Assistant" (experienced RCAF Aerospace Controllers or Search and Rescue Technicians)

Air and Marine controllers are collectively called "mission coordinators". All JRCC personnel function together as a team to ensure that response to distress incidents is coordinated effectively. The military administration is carried out by the OIC (Officer in Charge) and the Chief Clerk (any elemental uniform.) The Coast Guard is done by the Senior Coast Guard member and Coast Guard Base Admin Support.

== Location ==
JRCC Victoria is located on Canadian Forces Base Esquimalt (CFB Esquimalt), within Greater Victoria, British Columbia. JRCC Victoria ties into the Canadian Mission Control Center (CMCC), Nav Canada, and the Canadian Coast Guard Marine Communications and Traffic Services alerting system.

== Geographic area ==
The Victoria Search and Rescue Region (SRR) comprises the land masses of British Columbia and Yukon, as well as a portion of the north-eastern Pacific Ocean. It is approximately 490,000 square miles (1,300,000 km^{2}) of mainly mountainous terrain, with another 275,000 square miles (710,000 km^{2}) of ocean and 20,000 miles (32,000 km) of coastline. The oceanic area extends westward from the British Columbia coast approximately 900 miles (1,400 km) in the south and 350 miles (560 km) in the north.

== Resources ==
=== Air ===
The primary SAR air resource in the Victoria region is 442 Transport and Rescue Squadron located at 19 Wing Comox on Vancouver Island. 442 Squadron is equipped with five CH-149 Cormorant helicopters and six CC-295 Kingfisher fixed-wing aircraft. The Kingfisher is the primary search platform. The Cormorant is the main rescue aircraft, and because of its versatility, it can operate effectively in mountain and marine environments. Other aircraft are available from federal and provincial departments if required. JRCC Victoria will also charter local helicopters to perform certain SAR functions as required.

The Civil Air Search and Rescue Association (CASARA) is a national organization of volunteers who actively participate in aircraft searches. They have 980 members and operate 100 private aircraft in many areas of the Victoria SRR. CASARA may be tasked at any time of day or night and can conduct both electronic direction-finding missions and visual searches. They are a primary source of trained spotters for military and civilian aircraft participating in major searches, and they often provide or arrange facilities for temporary search headquarters.

=== Marine ===
The Canadian Coast Guard provides the primary marine resources to the federal SAR system, with two vessels continually patrolling the north/south SAR areas, plus 11 rescue cutters and 2 hovercraft located at 12 stations on 30 minute standby. During the summer season, the regular SAR fleet is supplemented by Zodiac-type inshore rescue boats at locations with high concentrations of pleasure craft. In addition to these full-time SAR resources, the Canadian Coast Guard and other federal departments operate a variety of other vessels which are multi-tasked but available for SAR if needed. Royal Canadian Navy ships are considered as secondary SAR resources under the National SAR Plan and regularly respond to an incident if tasked by a JRCC.

Royal Canadian Marine Search and Rescue is a volunteer marine SAR group with 1,100 members across 42 Stations which operate 380 private rescue boats. They are well organized, train regularly and are on standby 365 days a year, 24 hours a day; these community-based volunteers can often provide the fastest response and work closely with the Canadian Coast Guard as well as other SAR resources. Vessels of opportunity are important in resolving many cases. International law requires that vessels assist each other during distress situations and many, if not most, marine cases are resolved by assistance from other vessels in the vicinity of the distress.

=== Adjacent RCCs ===
JRCC Victoria works closely with, and shares resources freely with three adjacent RCCs:

- Juneau, Alaska to the north
- Seattle, Washington to the south
- Joint Rescue Coordination Centre Trenton (JRCC Trenton) to the east

The coastal RCCs share common air and marine radio circuits and all RCCs are linked by hot line telephones. Canadian JRCC's are mutually connected through the Canadian SAR Mission Management System (SMMS) computer network. It is not unusual for American or Canadian rescue units to respond to distress calls in each other's jurisdiction when they are the closest available unit. Joint operating agreements and special customs procedures promote maximum cooperation that provides an optimal response to any distress.

=== SARSAT ===
One of the most useful tools for the Canadian SAR system is the Cospas-Sarsat satellite surveillance system that was jointly founded in 1981 by Canada, USA, France and USSR. At present 18 countries participate. The Canadian system uses three earth stations (LUT's) – Edmonton, Churchill and Goose Bay, to monitor satellites in polar orbit. These satellites detect and locate air and marine emergency beacons, referred to as Electronic Location Transmitters (ELTs), Electronic Position Indicating Radio Beacons (EPIRBs), and Personal Locating Beacons (PLB's) which transmit on 121.5, 243.0 and 406.0 MHz. The resultant distress signal is then routed to the appropriate JRCC for action.
