= Chris Whitecross =

Christine Theresa Whitecross CMM, MSM, CD
- Born: July 7, 1961 (age 65); Germany
- Military career
- Allegiance: Canada
- Branch: Royal Canadian Air Force (Note: Known as Air Command until 2011)
- Service years: 1982–2020
- Rank: Lieutenant-General (R)
- Commands: Joint Task Force North (2006–2008); Chief Military Engineer (2014–2015); Military Personnel Command (2015–2017); NATO Defense College (2017–2020)
- Awards: Commander of the Order of Military Merit; United States Meritorious Service Medal

Christine Theresa Whitecross (born 7 July 1961), CMM, MSM, CD, is a Canadian retired lieutenant-general. A graduate of Queen's University and the Royal Military College of Canada, she has served in Germany, Bosnia, and Afghanistan. Whitecross has twice been named one of Canada's 100 most-powerful women. She was commandant of the NATO Defense College in Rome.

== Early life and education ==
Chris Whitecross was born in Germany, where her father was posted with the Royal Canadian Air Force. The family followed her father to CFB Bagotville, North Bay, and Annapolis Valley, Canada. She was in the cadet pipe band as a child. She decided to become an engineer in ninth grade and her father, who was impressed by the uniforms of its engineers, advised her to attend Queen's University. She enlisted in the Canadian Armed Forces (CAF) during her second year at university. She graduated from Queen's University with a degree in chemical engineering and was posted as an engineering officer to Germany, Bosnia, Afghanistan, and across Canada. She also has a master's degree in defense studies from the Royal Military College of Canada.

== Career ==
She has been made a commander of the Order of Military Merit, received the United States Meritorious Service Medal for service in Afghanistan and the Canadian Meritorious Service Medal for her role as secretary-general of the International Military Sports Council. Whitecross was the first female three-star general to be appointed in the CAF.

Whitecross has held several high-level staff posts including as Director of the Infrastructure and Environment Corporate Service, Chief of Staff for the Assistant Deputy Minister, Joint Engineer of Canada Command, Executive Assistant to the Chief of the Air Staff, and Chief Military Engineer of the Canadian Armed Forces. In Bosnia, she was head of logistics and manpower for the engineer contingent of UNPROFOR and was the Deputy Chief of Staff for Communications with ISAF in Afghanistan. Whitecross has commanded 1 Construction Engineer Unit and was deputy commander of Canadian Operational Support Command.

In February 2015 Whitecross became head of a team tasked with responding to allegations of sexual misconduct in the CAF. She was promoted to the rank of lieutenant-general on 26 May 2015, becoming the most senior female Canadian military engineer. Whitecross was appointed commander of Military Personnel Command in June 2015. In summer 2017 she became commandant of the NATO Defense College in Rome, Italy, being elected by representatives of the 28 NATO member states. She is the first woman and the third Canadian to hold the position.

Whitecross retired from the military in December 2020.

== Awards and honors ==
Whitecross was named one of Canada's 100 most-powerful women in 2011 and 2016. She was awarded the 2018 Vimy Award by the Conference of Defence Associations Institute for contributions to the security and defence of Canada.

== Personal life ==
Whitecross's husband was also in the Canadian military, but resigned to look after their children. The family have taken in 33 foster children, being inspired to do so by her parents, who were also foster carers.
