= Canada Command =

Former operational command of the Canadian Armed Forces

- Commandement Canada (French)
- Badge of Canada Command
- Active: 2006–2012
- Country: Canada
- Branch: Canadian Forces
- Type: Command headquarters
- Garrison/HQ: National Defence Headquarters
- Motto(s): Protegimus et defendimus (Latin for 'We protect and we defend')
- March: "Canada Command March"

Canada Command (CANCOM, French: Commandement Canada) was one of the four operational commands of the Canadian Forces from 2006 to 2012. It was responsible for routine domestic and continental operations, such as search and rescue, sovereignty patrol, national security coordination and contingency planning. As an operational formation, Canada Command used resources generated from the three environmental commands of the Canadian Forces: the Royal Canadian Navy, the Canadian Army and the Royal Canadian Air Force. The command was merged into the Canadian Joint Operations Command in October 2012.

== Role and structure ==
Canada Command's primary role was to "deter, prevent, preempt, and defeat threats and aggression aimed at Canada". To this end, the command was responsible for assessing and developing national contingency response plans in order to react rapidly at the request of the Government of Canada. It shared resources with the Canadian Operational Support Command (now merged), the Canadian Special Operations Forces Command and to a lesser extent with the Canadian Expeditionary Force Command (also merged), offered a single point of contact for civil authorities, law enforcement agencies and security partners, and maintained a close relationship with the United States Northern Command and the North American Aerospace Defence Command. The command was divided into ten subordinate organizations: six joint task forces (JTFs), three search and rescue regions (SRRs), and a single air component commander (CFACC) responsible for the allocation of air assets to the JTFs. At the national and regional level, Canada Command planned for contingencies, allocated resources for routine domestic and continental operations, and maintained the capacity to deploy military assets in assistance to civil authorities. Canada Command reported directly to the Chief of the Defence Staff and was headed by Lieutenant-General Walter Semianiw, CMM MSC CD and its senior non-commissioned member was Chief Warrant Officer Michel J.Y. Ouellet, MMM CD.

=== Domestic operations ===
Natural disaster or security incident response in Canada is generally the responsibility of local and provincial governments, who may come to require the help of the federal government. In such cases, and at the explicit request of the Minister of Public Safety, Canada Command could allocate military resources to assist civil authorities in humanitarian capacity, and if the Emergencies Act was activated, in peace enforcement capacity. The command could also be called to coordinate military resources in support of law enforcement and federal agencies as part of an Integrated Security Unit during large national events. This was the case during the 2010 Vancouver Olympics, the 2010 G-8 Huntsville summit and the 2010 G-20 Toronto summit. Routine operations conducted by Canada Command included the deployment of support elements to various Royal Canadian Mounted Police operations, Fisheries and Oceans Canada's Canadian Coast Guard in sea and coastal patrol and the war on drugs in the Caribbean, and Parks Canada in security enforcement and avalanche control. The command was also the main coordinator of joint exercises, such as the annual Operation Nanook, and a multitude of field exercises and manoeuvres. The control and coordination of military resources placed under Canada Command was assumed at the national level and through six regional task forces:

- Joint Task Force (North), based in Yellowknife, Northwest Territories, includes all Canadian territories north of the 60th parallel: Yukon, the Northwest Territories, and Nunavut;
- Joint Task Force (Pacific), based at the CFB Esquimalt naval base in British Columbia and commanded by the Commander of Maritime Forces Pacific, includes British Columbia, its coastlines and the Pacific maritime approaches;
- Joint Task Force (West), based at the CFB Edmonton army base in Alberta and commanded by the Commander of Land Force Western Area, includes the provinces of Alberta, Saskatchewan and Manitoba;
- Joint Task Force (Central), based in Toronto, Ontario, and commanded by the Commander of Land Force Central Area, is responsible for the province of Ontario;
- Joint Task Force (East), based in Montreal, Quebec, and commanded by the Commander of Land Force Quebec Area, is responsible for the province of Quebec;
- Joint Task Force (Atlantic), based at the CFB Halifax naval base in Nova Scotia and commanded by the Commander of Maritime Forces Atlantic, includes the provinces of New Brunswick, Prince Edward Island, Nova Scotia, Newfoundland and Labrador, and the adjacent maritime region;
- The Combined Force Air Component Commander (CFACC), based at the CFB Winnipeg air base in Manitoba, is responsible for the air support elements placed under the command through the Regional Air Component Elements (RACE) and for the assignment of assets to the Canadian NORAD Region (CANR) through the Royal Canadian Air Force's 1 Canadian Air Division.

=== Search and rescue ===
Federal search and rescue (SAR) in Canada is managed by the Department of National Defence's autonomous National Search and Rescue Secretariat in collaboration with a multitude of agencies, among them the Canadian Forces. Using assets generated and maintained by the Royal Canadian Air Force and the civilian Canadian Coast Guard, Canada Command assumed operational control of the primary SAR response providers through three Search and Rescue Regions (SRRs) and their associated coordination centres:

- JRCC Victoria, based at the CFB Esquimalt naval base in British Columbia, is responsible for the Victoria Search and Rescue Region, consisting of British Columbia, Yukon and over 560,000 square kilometres in the Pacific Ocean.
- JRCC Trenton, based at the CFB Trenton air base in Ontario, is responsible for the Trenton Search and Rescue Region, covering over 10,000,000 square kilometres from Quebec City to the Rocky Mountains and from the Canada–United States border to the North Pole. JRCC Trenton, operating alongside the Canadian Mission Control Centre, is also responsible for operating the Canadian component of the satellite-based Cospas-Sarsat distress alert detection system.
- JRCC Halifax, based at the CFB Halifax naval base in Nova Scotia, is responsible for the Halifax Search and Rescue Region, covering more than 4,700,000 square kilometres from Quebec City to the Eastern Arctic, including all four Atlantic provinces.

== History ==
Canada Command was created on 1 February 2006 as part of a restructuring of the Canadian Forces. Prior to the establishment of the command, national contingency and routine operations were carried directly by the three environmental services (Navy, Army, Air Force). The North American ice storm of 1998 and the September 11 attacks showed a need for a more efficient and coherent organization to coordinate military resources with civil authorities and the United States. Since its creation, Canada Command has conducted humanitarian operations in Newfoundland, Quebec, Ontario and Manitoba, in fighting floods, repairing critical infrastructure, recovering drivers stuck in severe winter storms, and conducting evacuation of threatened communities.

In May 2012, in a major restructuring of the Canadian Forces, Canada Command was merged with the Canadian Expeditionary Force Command and the Canadian Operational Support Command to form the Canadian Joint Operations Command.

== See also ==
- Military history of Canada
