= 440 Transport Squadron =

Unit of the Canadian Forces

Coordinates: 62°28′07″N 114°25′47″W

- 440^{e} Escadron de transport (French)
- Active: 5 October 1932–present
- Country: Canada
- Branch: Royal Canadian Air Force
- Part of: 8 Wing
- Headquarters: Canadian Forces Northern Area Headquarters Yellowknife
- Motto: Ka ganawaitak Saguenay (Innu for 'He who protects the Saguenay')
- Equipment: 4 CC-138 Twin Otters
- Battle honours: Fortress Europe, 1944; France and Germany, 1944–1945; Normandy, 1944; Arnhem; Rhine; Aleutians, 1942–1943
- Website: www.canada.ca/en/air-force/corporate/squadrons/440-squadron.html

Commanders
- Current commander: LCol Marc-Andre Martin

Aircraft flown
- Transport: CC-138 DHC-6 Twin Otter

440 Transport Squadron is a unit of the Canadian Armed Forces under the Royal Canadian Air Force. It is part of 8 Wing and works closely with Joint Task Force (North) in Yellowknife, Northwest Territories.

Based at Yellowknife Airport and operating throughout Northern Canada, the unit's primary role is to provide support to the Canadian Forces, including the Canadian Rangers and the Royal Canadian Air Cadets, with search and rescue as a secondary role. The squadron operates four CC-138 DHC-6 Twin Otter aircraft that can fly on tundra tires, skis or floats, though the float program was abandoned in 1999 when it was determined that there was not enough call for that capability in the CF.

The squadron was founded in the 1930s as an army cooperation squadron. It was for a time an air defence squadron from the start of the Second World War before moving to the United Kingdom. There it equipped as a fighter-bomber squadron under Royal Air Force (RAF) operational control, flying Hawker Typhoon aircraft. 440 Squadron supported the ground campaign through Northwest Europe until the end of the war.

== History ==
=== 1930s ===
No. 440 Squadron RCAF was a Second World War Royal Canadian Air Force squadron that operated as part of the RAF in Europe with the Hawker Typhoon.

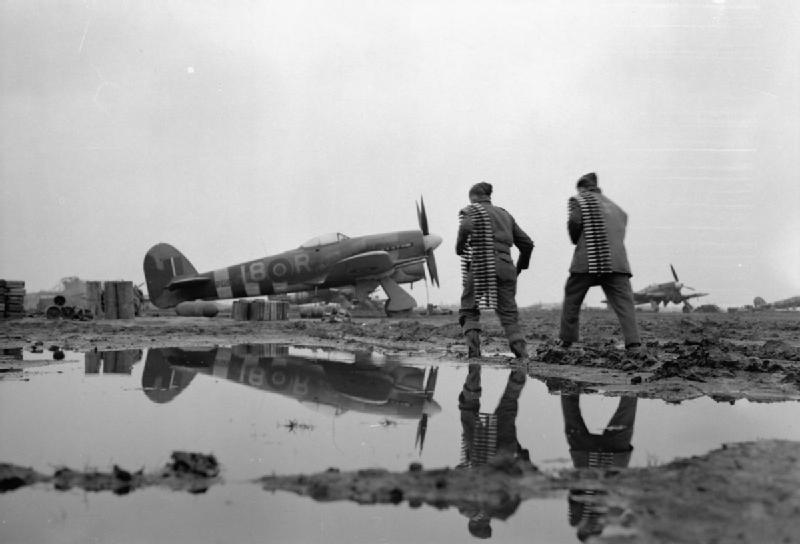
RCAF 440 Squadron Typhoon and armourers in the Netherlands, 1944

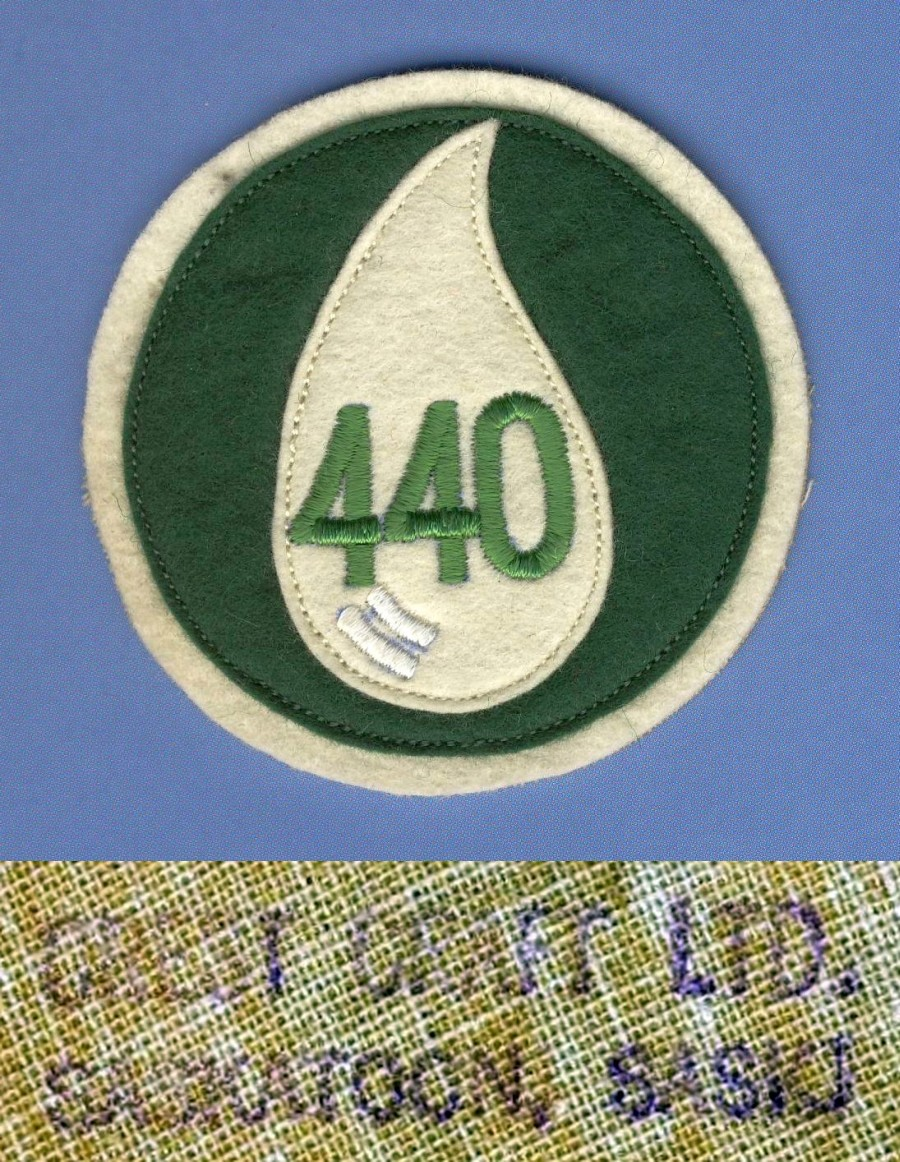
An RCAF 440 uniform shoulder patch used by the squadron circa 1957. The Crest Craft back-stamp was used only between 1957 and 1959.

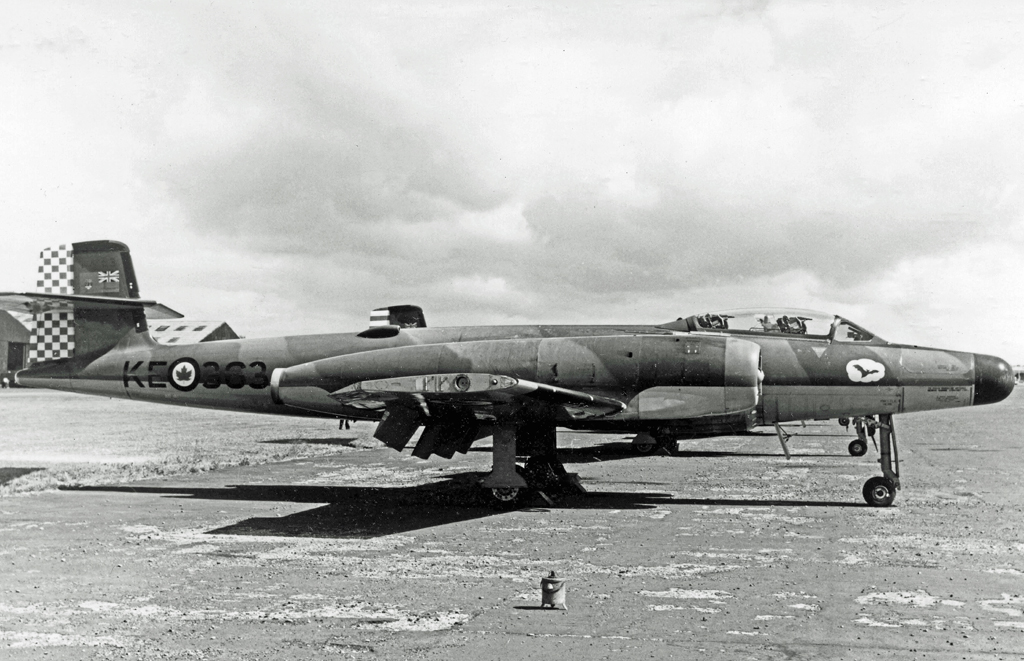
Avro Canada Canuck of 440 Squadron in 1960

The squadron was authorized in Vancouver on 5 October 1932 as No. 11 (Army Co-Operation) Squadron, an auxiliary squadron of the Royal Canadian Air Force. It received its first aircraft, four de Havilland DH.60M Gipsy Moths, settling down to a routine of flying training at the weekends, with an annual summer camp. In 1935, it received a single Fleet Fawn trainer, equipped for blind-flying training, and in 1937, received two Avro Tutors. The squadron was redesignated No. 111 (Coast Artillery Co-Operation) Squadron on 15 November 1937, with the duty of spotting for coastal defence artillery, although any operational training was still geared to the army-cooperation role. In March 1938, a single Avro 626 replaced one of the squadron's Gipsy Moths, allowing the squadron to carry out more realistic training, and in August that year, it received a single de Havilland Tiger Moth, with the squadron's two remaining Gipsy Moths withdrawn in June 1939.

=== Second World War ===
At the outbreak of the Second World War the squadron formed a detachment at Patricia Bay on Vancouver Island, now Victoria International, before being redesignated No. 111 (Fighter) Squadron on 1 July 1940. At this time the squadron flew the Westland Lysander as no modern fighter aircraft were available. It was disbanded on 1 February 1941 and then reformed on 3 November 1941 flying the Curtis Kittyhawk. The squadron and took part in air defence operations in Western Canada and the Aleutian Islands Campaign under RCAF Western Air Command. The squadron had the distinction of shooting down the only Japanese fighter by the RCAF home air force during the war. From the new American base in Umnak, Alaska, flying the Curtis P-40K from American stock, 111 Squadron took part in several raids against the Japanese base at Kiska. On 26 September 1942 the Commanding Officer, Squadron Leader K A Boomer, shot down an intercepting Nakajima A6M2-N Rufe fighter while leading four Canadian-manned P-40s involved in flak suppression.

=== Transfer to Britain ===
After the squadron moved to RAF Ayr where it was redesignated 440 Squadron on 8 February 1944 as an Article XV squadron under the control of the British Royal Air Force. It was the third Canadian Typhoon equipped squadron of 143 Wing. The squadron was equipped with the Hawker Hurricane for working up but changed to the Hawker Typhoon once they were delivered.

After a period of training the squadron began operations on 30 March 1944 with the Typhoons from RAF Hurn in the fighter bomber role. Originally the Typhoons were fitted with 500-pound (230 kg) bombs but later were able to carry a 1,000-pound (450 kg) bomb under each wing. The squadron supported and followed the allied armies through France, Netherlands and then into Germany. Although the Canadian Typhoons operated mostly as dive bombers they also flew top cover to protect their aircraft from interception. While bombing in the St. Vith area on 27 December 1944, 440 Squadron engaged three Bf 109s, shooting down one of them, for the squadron's second aerial kill in the war. The squadron was disbanded at Flensburg on 26 August 1945.

=== 1950s ===
In 1953 the squadron was reformed at RCAF Station Bagotville and equipped with the Avro Canada CF-100 Canuck. From 1957 until 1962, when they were once again disbanded, the squadron, part of 3 Wing, was stationed at Zweibrücken Air Base, West Germany, as part of Canada's commitment to NATO.

=== Redesignation as transport and rescue ===
The squadron was reactivated a final time on 8 July 1968 at CFB Winnipeg as No. 440 Communications and Rescue Squadron with Douglas Dakotas and Vertol H-21 helicopters and redesignated as 440 Transport and Rescue Squadron in October. They later moved to CFB Namao just outside Edmonton where they operated de Havilland Canada CC-115 Buffalo and CC-138 Twin Otters. At the time, two of the Twin Otters were stationed in Yellowknife, and in 1994 after CFB Namao closed the squadron moved north to be redesignated No. 440 Transport Squadron in 1995.

No. 440 Squadron does not share a lineage with No. 11 (Bomber Reconnaissance) Squadron.

== Aircraft operated ==
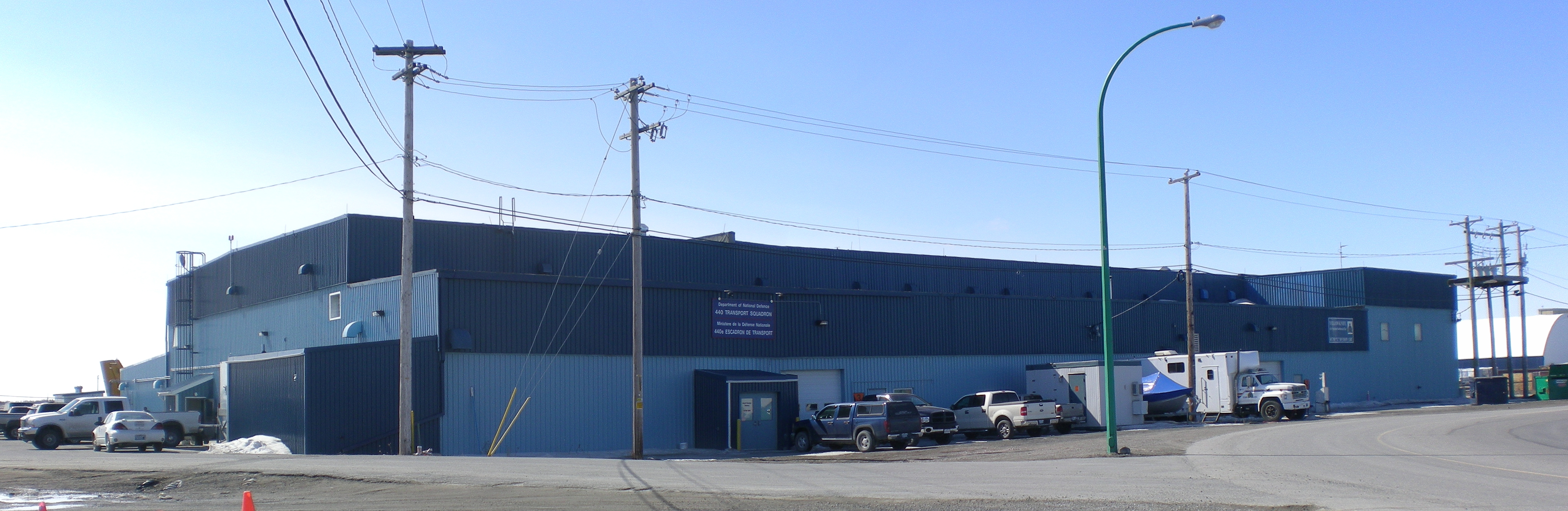
440 Transport Squadron (left) and RCMP Air Division (right) base at Yellowknife Airport

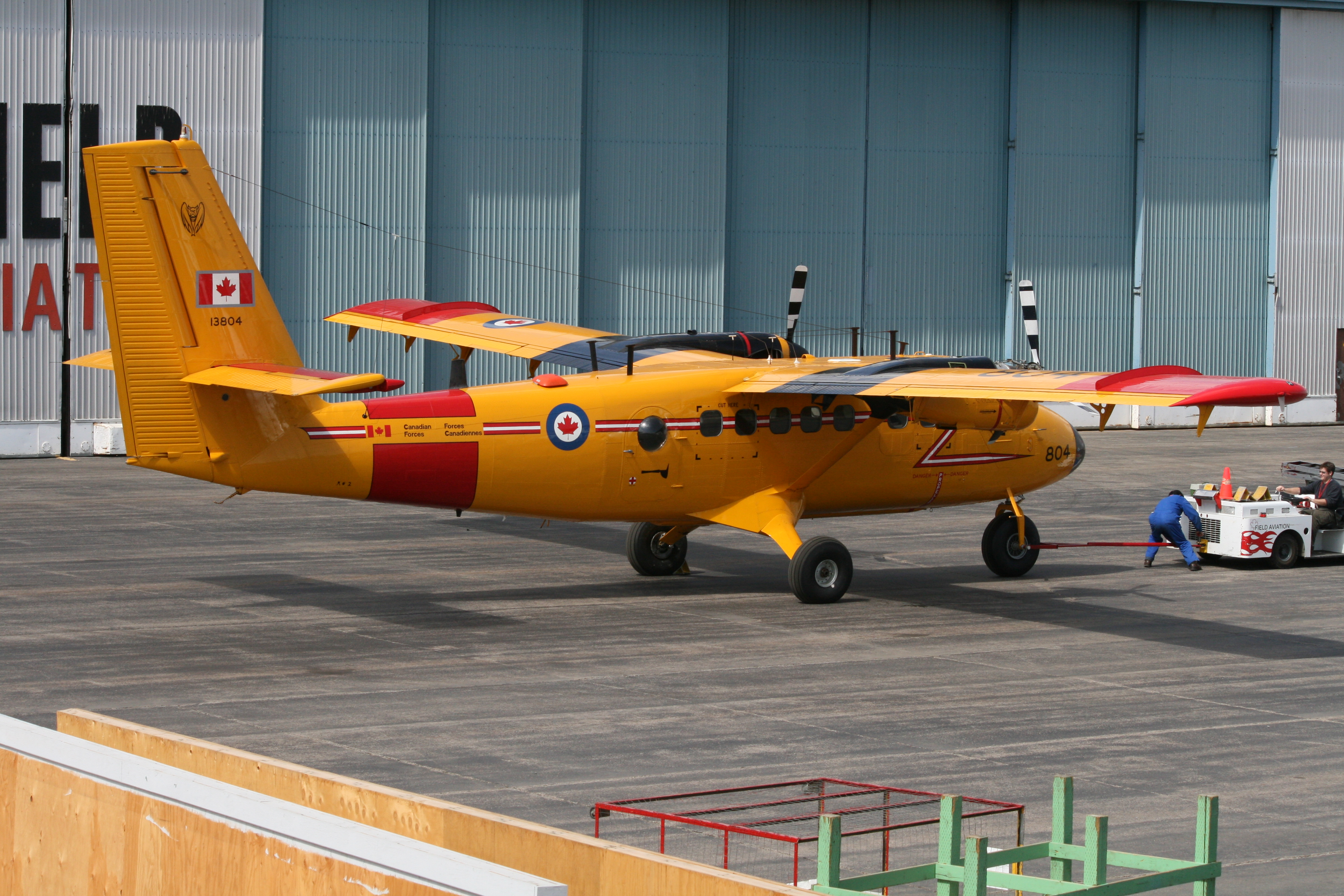
440 Squadron CC-138 Twin Otter

Aircraft operated
Dates	Aircraft	Variant	Notes
1932–?	de Havilland DH.60 Moth		Single-engine, 2 seat biplane
1940–41	Westland Lysander		Single-engine, 2 seat army co-op a/c
1942–1944	Curtiss P-40 Warhawk	Kittyhawk	Single-engined ground-attack aircraft
1944	Hawker Hurricane	IV	Single-engined fighter bomber
1944–1945	Hawker Typhoon	IB	Single-engined fighter bomber
1953–1962	Avro CF-100 Canuck		All-weather jet interceptor/fighter
1968–1989	Douglas Dakota		Transport, search and rescue
1968–?	Vertol H-21 helicopters		Tandem roter helicopter
1971–?	de Havilland Canada DHC-5 Buffalo	CC-115	STOL transport aircraft
1971–present	de Havilland Canada DHC-6 Twin Otter	CC-138	Light transport, STOL, bush airplane

== Notes ==
References

- The Illustrated Encyclopedia of Aircraft (Part Work 1982–1985). Orbis Publishing. 1985.
- Jefford, C.G. (1988). RAF Squadrons. Airlife Publishing Ltd. ISBN 1-85310-053-6.
- Vincent, Carl (July 1973). "Vancouver's Weekend Warriors: Story of 111 Squadron, RCAF, 1932–1939". Aircraft Illustrated. Vol. 7, no. 7. pp. 289–292.
