= Canadian Joint Operations Command =

One of two unified command of the Canadian Armed Forces

- Commandement des opérations interarmées du Canada
- Badge of CJOC
- Active: 5 October 2012–present
- Country: Canada
- Type: Command headquarters
- Size: 6 regional joint task forces
- Part of: Canadian Armed Forces
- Motto: Unanimi cum ratione (Latin for 'united in purpose')
- Engagements: Military intervention against ISIL
- Website: canada.ca/en/department-national-defence/corporate/organizational-structure/canadian-joint-operations-command.html

Commanders
- Commander CJOC: LGen Steve Boivin

Canadian Joint Operations Command (CJOC; French: Commandement des opérations interarmées du Canada) is one of the two unified commands for the military operations of the Canadian Armed Forces, the other being the Canadian Special Operations Forces Command.

CJOC's role is to "anticipate and conduct Canadian Forces operations, and develop, generate and integrate joint force capabilities for operations."

== History ==
CJOC was announced in May 2012 as the result of the cost-cutting measures in the 2012 federal budget through the merger of Canada Command, the Canadian Expeditionary Force Command and the Canadian Operational Support Command under an integrated command-and-control structure. The command was stood up on 5 October 2012 to officially replace the three former organizations.

== Organization ==
The command team is led by a lieutenant-general or vice-admiral and assisted by three deputy commanders, one for each of the three main components (Continental, Expeditionary, and Support). The team is further supported by a chief of staff and four senior non-commissioned members, an overall command chief warrant/petty officer, and a command chief warrant/petty officer for each component.

The continental component consists of six regional joint task forces (JTF). In five of these JTFs, the commander also commands an army division or a maritime force. The five southern JTFs have no permanent operational units: units and detachments are temporarily assigned to them from the Royal Canadian Navy, Canadian Army and Royal Canadian Air Force according to operational requirements.

Formations of CJOC
Task force	Headquarters	Region	Commander
Joint Task Force North	CFNA HQ Yellowknife	Northern Canada	Comd JTFN
Joint Task Force Pacific	CFB Esquimalt	British Columbia	Comd Maritime Forces Pacific
Joint Task Force West	CFB Edmonton	Prairie provinces	Comd 3rd Canadian Division
Joint Task Force Central	Denison Armoury, Toronto	Ontario	Comd 4th Canadian Division
Joint Task Force East	CFB Montreal	Quebec	Comd 2nd Canadian Division
Joint Task Force Atlantic	CFB Halifax	Atlantic Canada	Comd Maritime Forces Atlantic
1st Canadian Division	CFB Kingston	Expeditionary	Comd 1st Canadian Division

== See also ==
- Military history of Canada
