= Gender discrimination in the Canadian Military =

Women currently make up 14.8% of the Canadian Armed Forces, and are eligible to serve in all occupational specialties. The last occupational ban for females in the military was in 2001. In February 2018 the total representation of women who served in combat arms (crewman, artillery, artilleryman, infantryman, infantry, engineer, combat engineer, and armoured) was reported as 4.3%. Females who obtain officer status are mainly concentrated in the personnel and nursing fields.

== Historical overview of women in the Canadian Armed Forces ==
Women have played a role in the Canadian Forces for over 100 years. During World War II, women were restricted to non-combative positions such as nursing, cooking, communication, logistics, and administration. In 1971, following the recommendations from the Royal Commission on the Status of Women, the Canadian Armed Forces sought to expand the range of positions women could fill. Due to this expansion, women became employable as vehicle drivers and mechanics, aircraft mechanics, air-traffic controllers, military police, and firefighters. When the Canadian Human Rights Act and the Canadian Charter of Rights and Freedoms came into force in 1985, the Canadian Armed Forces’ policies were amended to allow women to serve at sea, in army service battalions, field ambulance units, and in most air squadrons. By 1987, women were permitted to occupy direct combat posts on the ground and at sea. While equality legislation was being passed, the defence minister conducted many trials on Service Women in Non- Traditional Environments and Roles, known as the SWINTER Trials. The minister sought to examine women's performance at positions typically reserved for males, as well as how the mixed gender group performed as a whole, in order to ascertain whether operative efficiency was undermined.

== Efforts towards equality ==
=== Achieving equal opportunity through legislation ===
==== Canadian Charter of Rights and Freedoms ====
The Canadian Charter of Rights and Freedoms came into force in 1982. There have been no challenges to the equality rights guarantees of Section 15 of the Charter or commenced an action against the Canadian Armed Forces on gender discrimination charges.

==== The Canadian Human Rights Act ====
The Canadian Human Rights Act is considered quasi-constitutional legislation, and applies to federal government agencies and Crown corporations including the Canadian Armed Forces. It acts to prohibit discrimination on specified grounds, such as race, sex, age, religion, and in the context of employment and publicly available services.

=== Achieving Equal Opportunity Through Litigation ===
In Gauthier v. Canadian Armed Forces, three women brought claims before a Canadian Human Rights Tribunal alleging that the Canadian Armed Forces had refused them employment on the basis of their gender, and that this was inconsistent with the Human Rights Act. The Canadian Armed Forces conceded that their policies were discriminatory, but relied on section 15(1)(a) to argue that they should be granted an exception based on a bona fide occupational requirement. They claimed that including women in certain specialized roles could undermine “operational effectiveness” and pose too much risk.

Isabelle Gauthier, a claimant working for the reserves, was refused a request to transfer location, because her desired location had already reached its 10% female quota. Following the complaint, the Canadian Armed Forces modified their policy to allocate reserve force positions based on susceptibility to combat or operational duty rather than gender. The Tribunal ordered the Canadian Armed Forces pay to the complainant $1,000 for suffering and loss of dignity in being refused employment, and $5,481 for lost wages. Marie-Claude Gauthier, a second claimant, was qualified to be a marine engineering technician, but was not permitted entry since the trade was not open to women. She relied on sections 5a and 10 of the Canadian Human Rights Act, which forbid denying a service and depriving employment opportunities on the basis of a prohibited ground of discrimination. The tribunal ordered that the marine engineering technician program be open to women who meet the required educational level and have enrolled in the CAF.

=== Efforts towards greater substantive equality ===
By opening up all positions to female service members, the Canadian Armed Forces has taken a major step towards providing equal opportunity for women hoping to enter the military. Nonetheless, the number of females in the Canadian military falls well below their most recent target of 25.1% female representation. Other measures have been adopted that go beyond efforts aimed at achieving formal equality by accounting for biological differences between genders. The most often cited example of this differential treatment towards male and female soldiers has been with regards to the physical fitness evaluation for entry into the Canadian Armed Forces, where requirements are lowered substantially for female candidates. A number of proactive initiatives are also underway that are intended to bring about a greater substantive equality for women through "the elimination of discriminatory practices and attitudes, rather than granting special privileges and status".

==== Recruiting ====
The Canadian Armed Forces employs a system whereby they periodically reassess representation goals for women in different roles, and monitor progress towards achievement of those goals. They have recently begun an active recruiting campaign showing women in all Canadian Armed Forces positions in an effort to attract more women to combat roles. Efforts are also made through outreach activities to create awareness regarding potential career opportunities amongst women professionals and students. These, and other proactive measures are aimed at the recruitment, development, and retention of women in order to create a more diverse Canadian military.

==== The Defence Diversity Council and Advisory Groups ====
The Defence Diversity Council is a fundamental part of the effort to achieve diversity in the Canadian Armed Forces. This body is responsible for making recommendations to the Deputy Minister and Chief of Defense Staff on policies and practices pertaining to diversity. Being a federally regulated employer, the Canadian Armed Forces are subjected to the provisions of the Employment Equity Act, and have set up four diversity advisory group for each of the four groups cited in that act as being susceptible to discriminatory practices. (including women). The Defense Woman Advisory organization's primary objectives include consulting with women in the military so that they may “provide advice and insight to the leadership on issues relevant to their membership and implementation of employment equity”. Both bodies are restricted to providing consultation and recommendations, as opposed to being direct participants in the policy and decision-making process.

== Does gender discrimination still exist in the Canadian Military? ==
Fully integrating women into the Canadian Armed Forces has not been an easy task. Many of the issues still affecting female soldiers appear to be rooted in a conflict between sameness and difference. Whereas the Canadian Military has demonstrated their willingness to accommodate gender differences in some instances, this is not always the case. For example, both male and female candidates must carry a fifty-five pound rucksack for thirteen kilometres to meet the fitness requirements for basic infantry. This presents more of a challenge for women because the shape of the rucksack is ill fitted for a female's physique. In this case, the Canadian Armed Forces adhered to the notion of sameness of treatment, whereby maleness was the norm and females were held to that standard. Recent Canadian studies indicate that women in combat roles are still subjected to an environment of non-acceptance. One study suggests that this is the primary cause for women's attrition rates being four times higher than that of their male counterparts. Sexual harassment also constitutes a significant problem in the Canadian military, though the frequency of cited incidents has decreased since the 90's. Several authors attribute these leftover discriminatory practices to a male-centric military culture, premised on the notion that the ideal image of a soldier is that of a physically strong, masculine war hero. Concerns have been raised that this creates barriers to women's advancement that have become embedded into the military institution, and can therefore not be addressed through traditional measures of achieving equality.

== Institutional reform as a potential path to improvement ==
Concerns over the efficacy of currently enforced equality measures in the military setting have led to the proposal of a new model for shaping policies and practices pertaining to military personnel focusing on diversity. The key characteristic of the diversity model is that “the organization, structure, and management of the military reflect the norms and values of civilian society”. Proponents of this model admit that implementation of this type of institutional reform is likely to prove challenging in a military setting, where combat effectiveness is paramount, and rank is typically governed by age, experience and seniority.
