= Canadian Forces Northern Area Headquarters Yellowknife =

Canadian Forces unit in the Northwest Territories

Canadian Forces Northern Area Headquarters (CFNA HQ) Yellowknife
- Secteur du nord des Forces Canadiennes
- Yellowknife, Northwest Territories in Canada
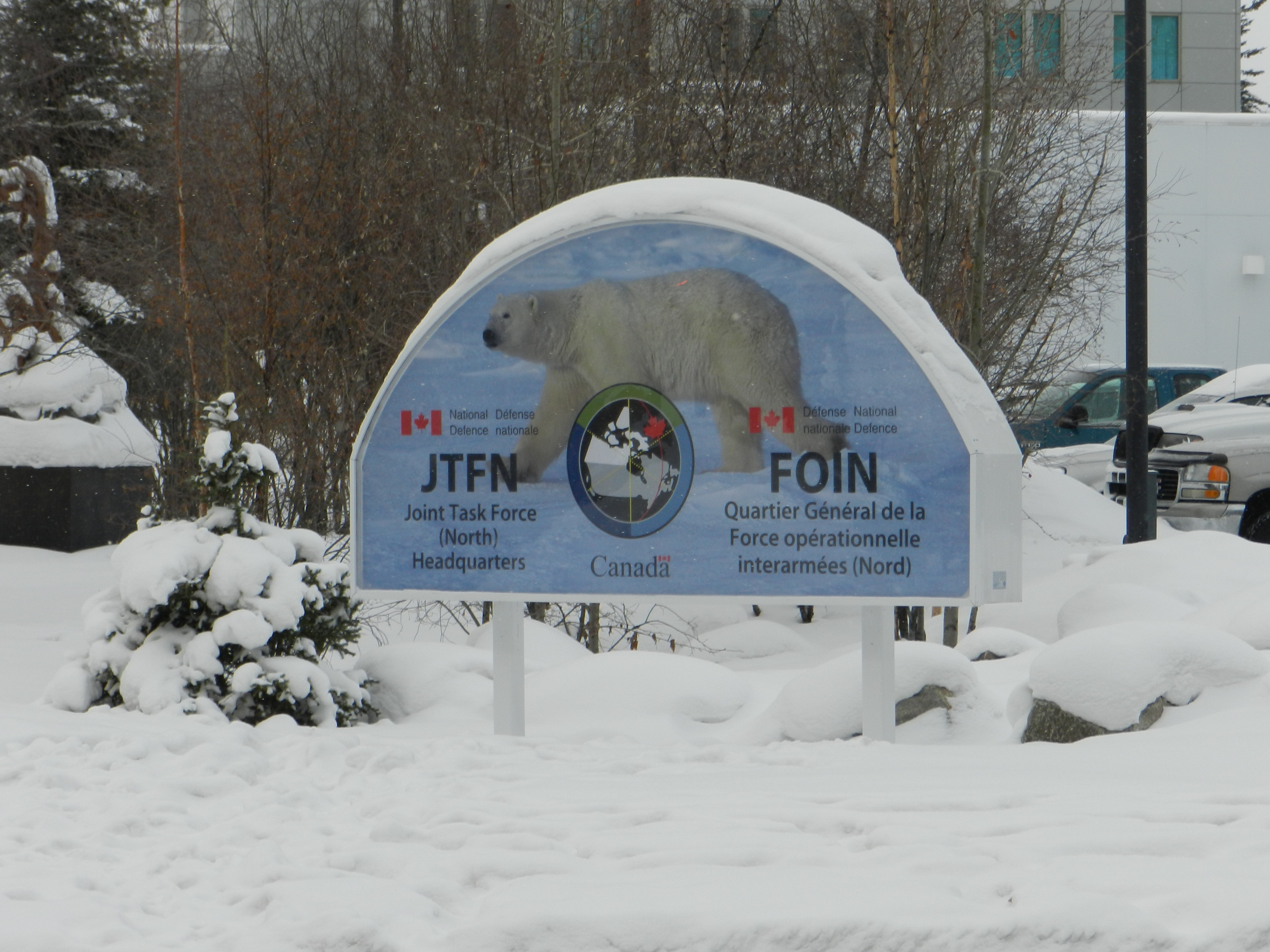

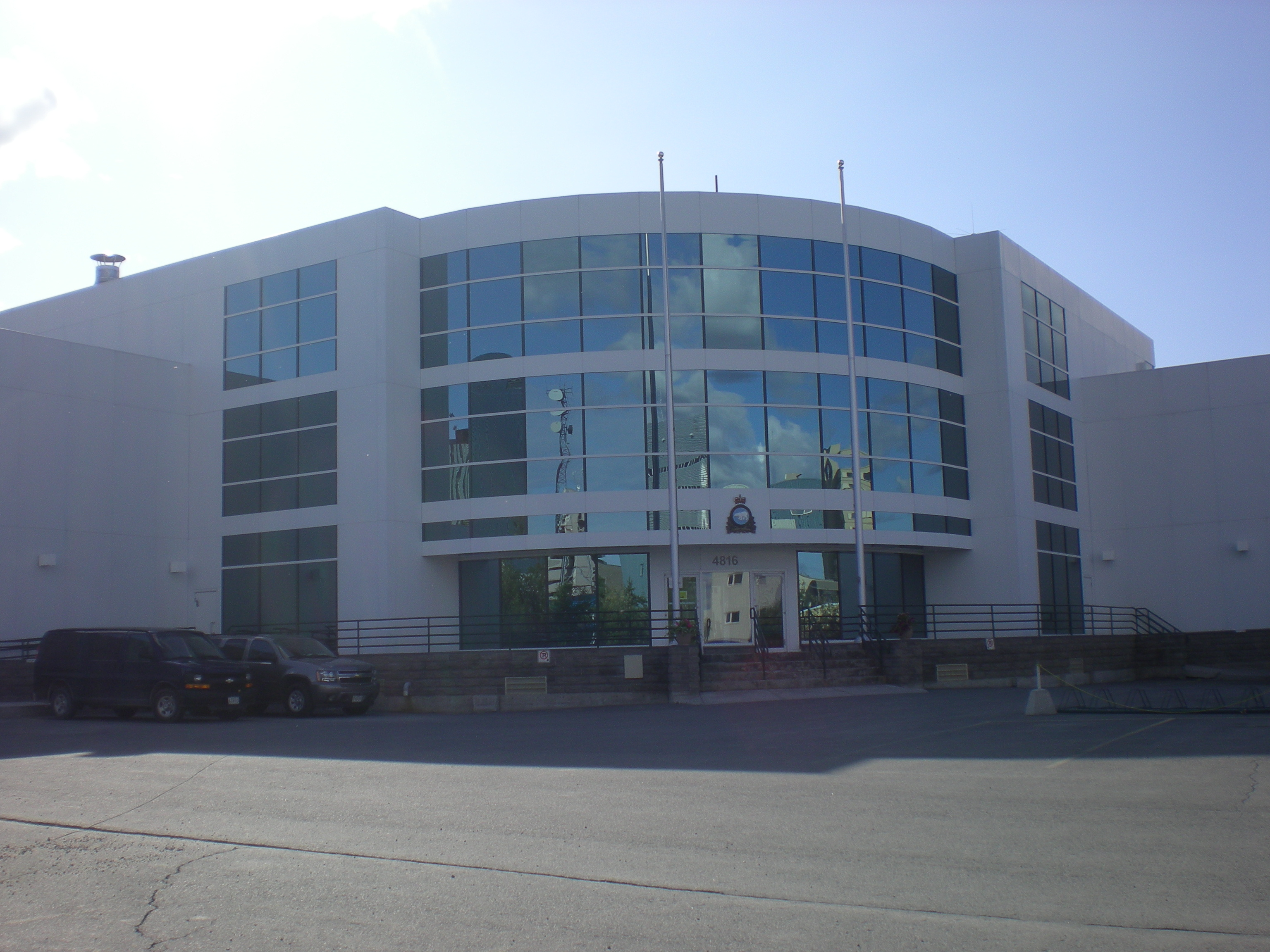
- Canadian Forces Northern Area Headquarters (CFNA HQ) Yellowknife (Evans Building)

Site information
- Owner: Canadian Armed Forces
- Website: Official website

Location
- CFNA HQ CFNA HQ (Canada)
- Coordinates: 62°27′21″N 114°22′31″W

Site history
- Built: 1970

Garrison information
- Current commander: Brigadier-General Pascal Godbout
- Occupants: 440 Transport Squadron

Canadian Forces Northern Area Headquarters (CFNA HQ) Yellowknife is a Canadian Forces unit in the city of Yellowknife, Northwest Territories.

Situated in Evans Building of the city of Yellowknife, it is the headquarters for Joint Task Force North, part of Canadian Joint Operations Command responsible for Canadian Forces operations and administration in Northern Canada and the Arctic.

There are 52 military and civilian personnel from 1st Canadian Rangers Patrol Group headquarters and 314 military and civilian personnel from Joint Task Force North currently stationed in Yellowknife responsible for coordinating military operations across 4,000,000 km^{2} (1,500,000 sq mi) of land in the Northwest Territories and Nunavut.

Canadian Forces Northern Area Headquarters Whitehorse has a similar responsibility in Yukon.

As of 2021 the current base Commander is Brigadier-General Pascal Godbout.

== History ==
The Canadian Forces Northern Area Headquarters Yellowknife was established on 15 May 1970 to assist and maintain Canadian sovereignty north of the 60th parallel and support Canadian Armed Forces operations in the north.

== Associated units ==
CFNA Yellowknife is home to multidisciplinary units that specialize in multidomain operations that contributes to Arctic awareness:

- Joint Task Force North
- 1st Canadian Ranger Patrol Group
- 440 Transport Squadron
- Yellowknife Company, The Loyal Edmonton Regiment (4th Battalion, Princess Patricia's Canadian Light Infantry)
- Area Support Unit (North)

== Future headquarters expansion ==
In 2018, Department of National Defence spokesman Andrew McKelvey announced a new building project. Canadian Forces Northern Area Headquarters Yellowknife will see the construction of a 7,600 m^{2} (82,000 sq ft) building for some of the technical services elements of the Joint Task Force North Area Support Unit, and the 1st Canadian Rangers Patrol Group.

The overall project is estimated to cost between $50 and $99 million and will include:

- offices
- an assembly space, which will double as a drill hall
- warehouse
- garage space

Construction is expected to start in the 2020-2021 time frame, with opening anticipated by 2024.
