= Postal Branch =

The Postal Branch was a personnel branch of the Canadian Forces (CF).

== History ==
During both World Wars, the Canadian Forces Postal Service mobilized many Post Office employees. The Canadian Forces Postal Service provided "mail from home" for the Canadian Forces by forwarding mail to restricted military zones in Canada and Europe, as well as other areas where Canadians serve in United Nations peacekeeping operations.

On January 1, 2001, the branch was integrated into the Logistics Branch.

== Recognition ==
On 9 May 1986 Canada Post issued 'Canadian Forces Postal Service, 1911-1986' as part of the Canadian Forces series. The stamps were designed by Jacques DesRosiers, based on a wartime photograph of military personnel handling letters and parcels. The 32¢ stamps are perforated 13.5 mm and were printed by Ashton-Potter Limited.
