= Canada First Defence Strategy =

Canadian military recruitment, procurement, and improvement strategy

The Canada First Defence Strategy (CFDS, French: Stratégie de défense Le Canada d'abord) was the military recruitment, procurement, and improvement strategy of the former Canadian government of Stephen Harper to improve the overall effectiveness of the Canadian Forces. The strategy aimed to enforce Arctic sovereignty with the Royal Canadian Mounted Police and the Canadian Coast Guard. CFDS was superseded by the defence policy of the Liberal Government introduced in 2017 entitled, "Strong, Secure and Engaged" (the SSE).

== Purpose ==
The purpose of the Canada First Defence Strategy was to give Canada a modern military with clearly defined missions and capabilities. The strategy focused on many key military functions and operations and on improving the equipment and fleets that the Canadian Forces operates. Many of the equipment capability objectives of CFDS were continued under the subsequent SSE.

=== Missions ===
The Canada First Defence Strategy was focused on six core missions as the level of ambition for the Canadian Forces. According to the strategy the forces must be able to support all of the following operations and if necessary, support them all simultaneously.

- Conduct daily domestic and continental operations, including in the Arctic and through NORAD.
- Support a major international event in Canada, such as the 2010 Winter Olympics.
- Respond to a major terrorist attack.
- Support civilian authorities during a crisis in Canada such as a natural disaster.
- Lead and/or conduct a major international operation for an extended period.
- Deploy forces in response to crises elsewhere in the world for shorter periods.

=== Personnel ===
The Canada First Defence Strategy also sought to increase the number of personnel in the Canadian Forces in order to improve the military's operational effectiveness. In 2008, the Canadian Forces had approximately 65,000 active personnel and 26,000 reserve personnel. However, the CFDS planned to increase personnel levels to 70,000 full-time and 30,000 reserve (mix of full- and part-time) sometime in the next 20 years, with an increase to 67,000 full-time personnel by 2009/2010, 68,000 by 2011/2012 and 69,300 by 2014/2015. The reserves (combined full- and part-time) were to reach 27,000 by 2011/2012 and 28,000 by 2014/2015. Some of this growth was slowed in the aftermath of the end of Canadian involvement in the war in Afghanistan.

== Equipment improvement and replacement ==
The CFDS provided a plan to invest $15 billion on the improvement and replacement of Canadian Forces' major fleets and equipment, to include:

- C-17 Globemaster aircraft – Final delivery in 2015
- C-130J Hercules aircraft – Final delivery in 2013
- Arctic Patrol Ship Project – Contract awarded January 2015 – steel cut starting September 2015; delivery of AOPS 1 occurred in 2020.
- CH-47F Chinook helicopters – Final delivery 2013
- Trucks
- Joint Support Ship Project – preliminary work on the lead ship modules only commenced in 2018.

Another $20 billion was committed for equipment replacement and improvement in the future, to include:

- fixed-wing search and rescue aircraft – contract awarded in 2016 for 16 C-295 aircraft.
- destroyers and frigates – construction of the future Canadian Surface Combatant was a core component of CFDS but the start date pushed back; construction of the lead ship is now expected to begin in 2025/26 following on the Arctic Offshore Patrol Ship program.
- maritime patrol aircraft – in lieu of new aircraft as proposed in CFDS, upgrades of 14 Aurora aircraft were carried out to keep them flying until 2030
- 65 new next-generation fighter aircraft to replace the CF-18 Hornets as the primary air superiority fighter – initial first delivery originally expected in 2013; delayed thereafter (under SSE contract now not expected until at least 2026 though envisaged numbers increased to 88).
- land combat vehicles and systems – Ongoing procurement throughout the timespan of the CFDS

== Funding ==
The Canada First Defence Strategy was also primarily focused on the funding for the Canadian Forces, and the strategy outlined plans to increase funding for the Canadian Forces from $18 billion in 2007–2008 to over $30 billion in 2027–2028. The overall funding and investments in the forces will amount to $490 billion over the 20-year period of the strategy. This projected spending increase was slowed by the Harper government after the end of the war in Afghanistan.

== See also ==
- Canadian Forces
- Joint Support Ship Project
- Arctic Patrol Ship Project
- Department of National Defence
