= List of military equipment of Canada =

This is a list of all equipment ever used by the Canadian armed forces. This will include all branches of the Canadian armed forces the Canadian Army, Royal Canadian Air Force, Royal Canadian Navy and any predecessors.

== Canadian Army ==
- List of military weapons of Canada

== Royal Canadian Air Force ==
- List of aircraft of Canada's air forces

== Royal Canadian Navy ==
- List of ships of the Royal Canadian Navy
