= Canadian Forces Northern Area Headquarters Whitehorse =

Canadian Forces Northern Area Headquarters (CFNA HQ) Whitehorse is a detachment of the Canadian Forces, based approximately 24 kilometres (15 mi) south of Whitehorse, Yukon.

Canada's military has operated in the area since the days of the famous volunteer Yukon Field Force, established by the Non-Permanent Active Militia in 1898, to help the North-West Mounted Police maintain law and order during the Gold Rush.

With the creation of the Alaska Highway through the region in 1942, Whitehorse developed into an important regional centre for communication and transportation. However, it was not until 1970 that the newly formed Canadian Forces established a permanent military presence in the area with the formation of the Northern Area Detachment at a base near Whitehorse, as well as another in Yellowknife, Northwest Territories, CFNA HQ Yellowknife.

CFNA HQ Whitehorse is frequently used for cadet training in the summer months.
