= Joint Task Force (North) =

Coordinates: 62°27′20″N 114°22′31″W

- Force opérationnelle interarmées (Nord) (French)
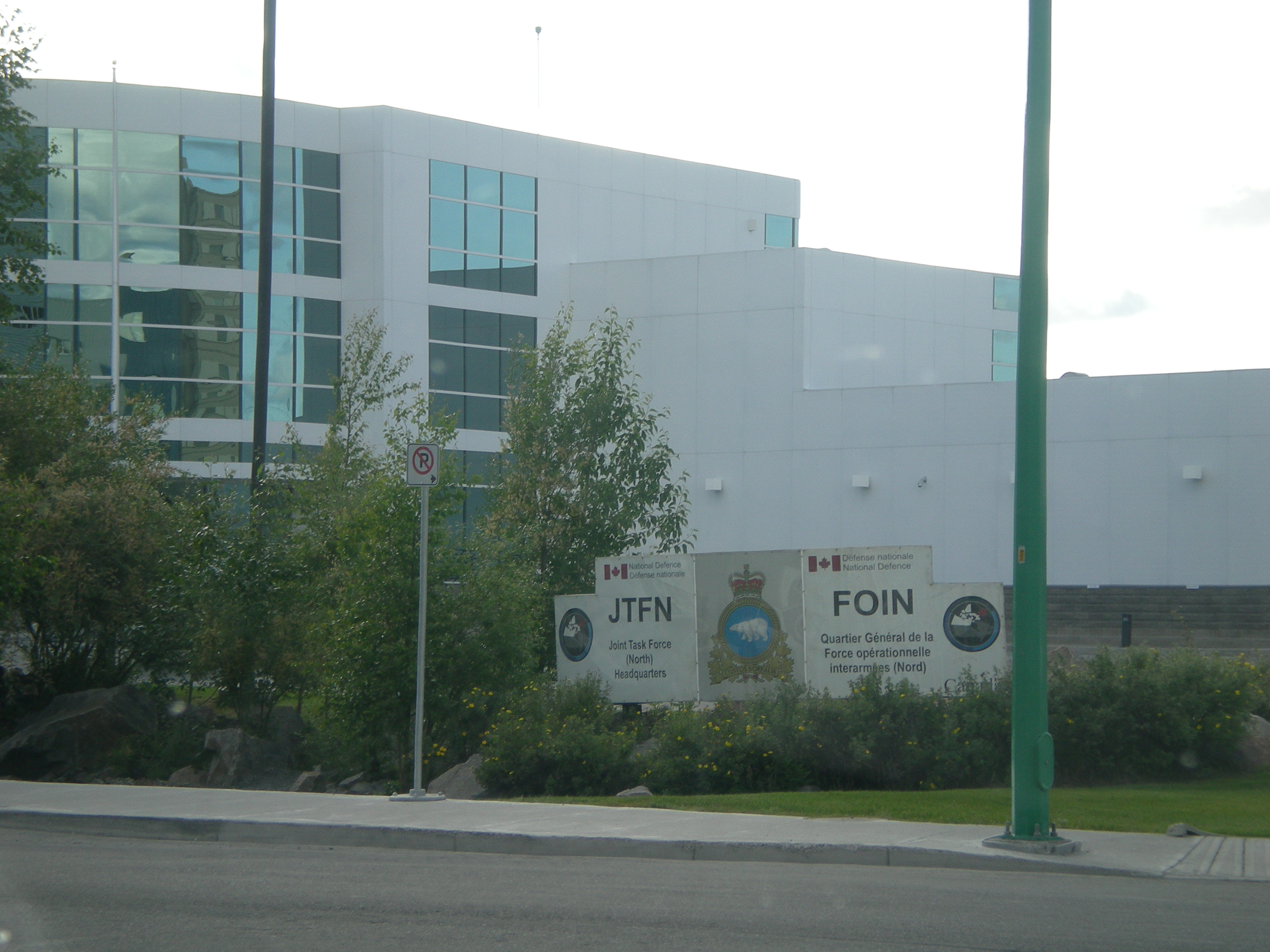
- Joint Task Force (North) HQ
- Active: 1970–present
- Country: Canada
- Size: 300
- Part of: Canadian Joint Operations Command
- Garrison/HQ: Yellowknife, Northwest Territories
- Website: www.canada.ca/en/department-national-defence/services/operations/military-operations/conduct/regional-task-force/north.html

Commanders
- Current commander: BGen J.M.Y.D. (Dan) Rivière, CD

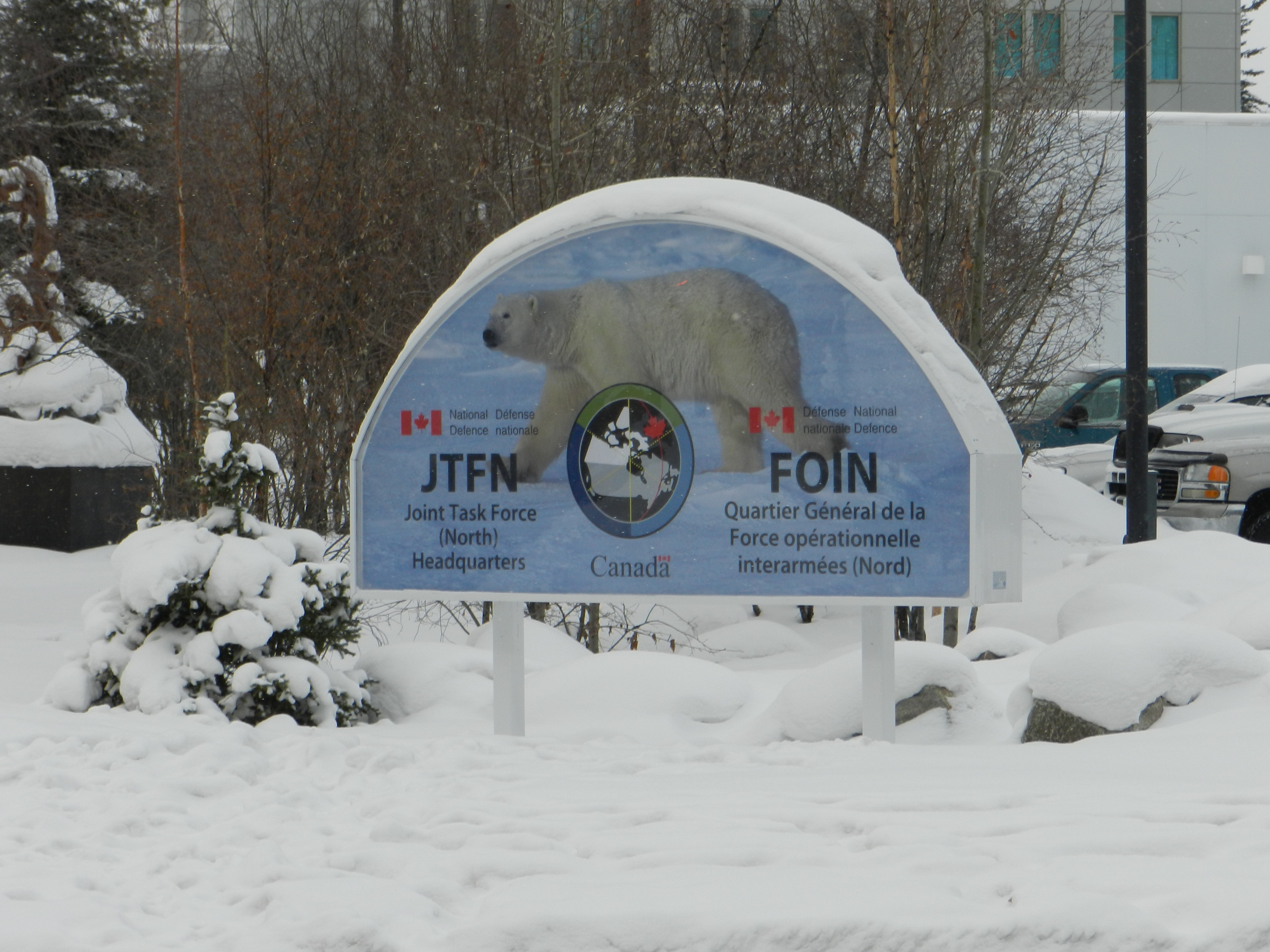
The sign outside the Joint Task Force North HQ.

Joint Task Force (North) (French: Force opérationnelle interarmées (Nord)) is responsible for all Canadian Armed Forces operations and administration in northern Canada, namely Yukon, Northwest Territories, Nunavut, and the waters of the Arctic Ocean (within Canada) and Hudson Bay. JTFN is headquartered in Yellowknife, Northwest Territories, and is part of Canadian Joint Operations Command.

JTFN has received increasing national attention since 2009 with greater emphasis being made on Canada's claim to arctic sovereignty. Each year, hundreds of Canadian soldiers participate in Operation Nanook, an annual display of sovereignty in Canada's northern latitudes. The operation has been held annually since 2007.

== Units within area of responsibility ==
=== Integral units ===
- Canadian Forces Northern Area Headquarters Yellowknife (Joint Task Force (North) Headquarters Yellowknife) - Yellowknife, Northwest Territories
- Joint Task Force (North) Headquarters Detachment Nunavut - Iqaluit, Nunavut
- Canadian Forces Northern Area Headquarters Whitehorse (Joint Task Force (North) Headquarters Detachment Yukon) - Whitehorse, Yukon

=== Lodger units ===
- 440 Transport Squadron (CFB Trenton or 8 Wing Trenton)
- C Company (The Yellowknife Company) (Loyal Edmonton Regiment)
- 1st Canadian Ranger Patrol Group (3rd Canadian Division)
- Yellowknife MP detachment

== Northern operations ==
- Operation Nanook
- Operation Nevus
- Operation Nunakput
- Operation Nunalivut
- Operation Limpid
