= Canadian Operational Support Command =

Former operational command of the Canadian Forces

- Badge of CANOSCOM
- Active: 2006 - 2012
- Country: Canada
- Branch: Canadian Armed Forces
- Type: Command Headquarters
- Motto(s): Cum Honore Sustinemus
- March: "CANOSCOM March"

Commanders
- Current commander: Major-General Mark E. McQuillan

The Canadian Operational Support Command (CANOSCOM) (in French : Commandement du soutien opérationnel du Canada or COMSOCAN) was one of seven commands of the Canadian Forces (CF) from 2006 to 2012. The command was replaced by the Canadian Joint Operations Command in October 2012. As a separate command, CANOSCOM provided the CF with combat support (including logistics, military engineering, land equipment maintenance services, communications and information systems, health services and military police) and service for both domestic and international missions.

== Composition ==
CANOSCOM consisted of approximately 1,100 soldiers from all branches of the Canadian Forces who provided operations support to thousands of Canadian Forces members involved in many missions. CANOSCOM commanded the Canadian Forces Joint Support Group, the Canadian Forces Joint Signal Regiment and Canadian Materiel Support Group. CANOSCOM had oversight over 16 units and formations. These included the:

- Canadian Materiel Support Group (CMSG)
  - 7 Canadian Forces Supply Depot
  - 25 Canadian Forces Supply Depot
  - CF Ammunition Depot Bedford
  - CF Ammunition Depot Dundurn
  - CF Ammunition Depot Rocky Point
  - CF Ammunition Depot Detachment Angus
- Canadian Forces Joint Signal Regiment
- OS Engr Gp
  - 1 Engineer Support Unit
- Canadian Forces Joint Support Group
  - CFJSG HQ
  - 3 Canadian Support Unit
  - 4 Canadian Forces Movement Control Unit
  - CF Postal Unit
- OS MP Gp
  - CFPSU

== See also ==
- Military history of Canada
- History of the Canadian Army
