= Canadian Armed Forces =

Unified military forces of Canada

- Forces armées canadiennes
- Badge of the CAF

- Flag of the CAF
- Current form: 1 February 1968; 58 years ago
- Service branches: Canadian Army; Royal Canadian Navy; Royal Canadian Air Force
- Headquarters: National Defence Headquarters, Ottawa, Ontario
- Website: www.canada.ca/en/services/defence/caf.html

Leadership
- Commander-in-Chief: Charles III, King of Canada, represented by Louise Arbour, Governor General of Canada
- Prime Minister: Mark Carney
- Minister of National Defence: David McGuinty
- Chief of the Defence Staff: General Jennie Carignan
- Vice Chief of the Defence Staff: Vice-Admiral Angus Topshee
- Chief Warrant Officer: CWO Bob McCann

Personnel
- Military age: 16–60 years old (Note: Persons 16 years of age, with parental permission, can join the Canadian Armed Forces.)
- Conscription: No
- Active personnel: 69,360 (2026)
- Reserve personnel: 33,650 (2026)
- Deployed personnel: approx. 5,000

Expenditure
- Budget: CA$75.1 billion US$53.49 billion
- Percent of GDP: 2.2% (2026-2027)

Industry
- Domestic suppliers: List L-3 Communications MAS; Bombardier Aerospace; CAE; Meggitt Training Systems Canada; Colt Canada; Textron Systems Canada; Kongsberg Protech Systems Canada; Rheinmetall Defence Canada; Irving Shipbuilding Inc. General Dynamics Land Systems Canada; Raytheon Canada Limited; Seaspan Marine Corporation; Thales Canada; Boeing Canada
- Foreign suppliers: List United Kingdom; United States; France; Italy; Sweden; Australia; Israel; Spain

Related articles
- History: Military history of Canada List of engagements Fenian Raids; Wolseley Expedition; North-West Rebellion; Second Boer War; World War I Russian Civil War; World War II; Korean War; Gulf War; Croatian War of Independence; Bosnian War; Somali Civil War; Kosovo War; Afghanistan War; 2011 Libyan Civil War; War against the Islamic State
- Ranks: Canadian Armed Forces ranks and insignia

The Canadian Armed Forces (CAF; French: Forces armées canadiennes, FAC) are the unified military forces of Canada, including sea, land, air, and special operations forces commands referred to as the Royal Canadian Navy, Canadian Army, Royal Canadian Air Force, and Canadian Special Operations Forces Command. Under the National Defence Act, the Canadian Armed Forces are an entity separate and distinct from the Department of National Defence (the federal government department responsible for the administration and formation of defence policy), which also exists as the civilian support system for the forces.

The commander-in-chief of the Canadian Armed Forces is the Governor General. The chief of the Defence Staff is the professional head of the Canadian Armed Forces, who under the direction of the minister of national defence and together with the assistance of the Armed Forces Council, manages the operations of the Canadian Armed Forces.

In 2026–2027, Canada's military expenditures are budgeted at approximately US$63 billion, or around 2.0 percent of the country's gross domestic product (GDP). The Canadian Armed Forces are a professional volunteer force that consists of approximately 100,000 personnel, split between approximately 68,000 active personnel and 32,000 reserve personnel, with a sub-component of approximately 5,000 Canadian Rangers.

Canada's peacekeeping role during the 20th century has played a major role in its positive global image. Canada has long been reluctant to participate in military operations that are not sanctioned by the United Nations (UN), such as the Vietnam War or the 2003 invasion of Iraq. In the 21st century, Canadian direct participation in UN peacekeeping efforts has greatly declined, with its military participation reallocated to UN-sanctioned operations through the North Atlantic Treaty Organization (NATO).

The CAF operates several other commands, including Canadian Forces Intelligence Command, Canadian Joint Operations Command, and Canadian Special Operations Forces Command. Personnel may belong to either the Regular Force or the Reserve Force, which has four sub-components: the Primary Reserve, Supplementary Reserve, Cadet Organizations Administration and Training Service, and the Canadian Rangers.

== History ==
=== Origins and establishment ===
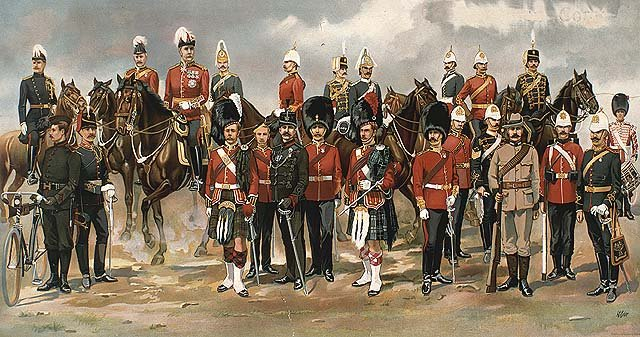
Uniforms of the Canadian militia in 1898. The Canadian Army traces its roots to the militia.

Prior to Confederation in 1867, residents of the colonies in what is now Canada served as regular members of French and British forces and in local militia groups. The latter aided in the defence of their respective territories against attacks by other European powers, Indigenous peoples, and later American forces during the American Revolutionary War and War of 1812, as well as in the Fenian raids, Red River Rebellion, and North-West Rebellion. Consequently, the lineages of some Canadian Army units stretch back to the late 18th century, when militia units were formed to assist in the defence of British North America against invasion by the United States.

The responsibility for military command remained with the British Crown-in-Council, with a commander-in-chief for North America stationed in Halifax until the final withdrawal of British Army and Royal Navy units from the city in 1906. Thereafter, the Royal Canadian Navy was formed, and, with the advent of military aviation, the Royal Canadian Air Force. These forces were organized under the Department of Militia and Defence, and split into the Permanent and Non-Permanent Active Militias—frequently shortened to simply The Militia. By 1923, the department was merged into the Department of National Defence.

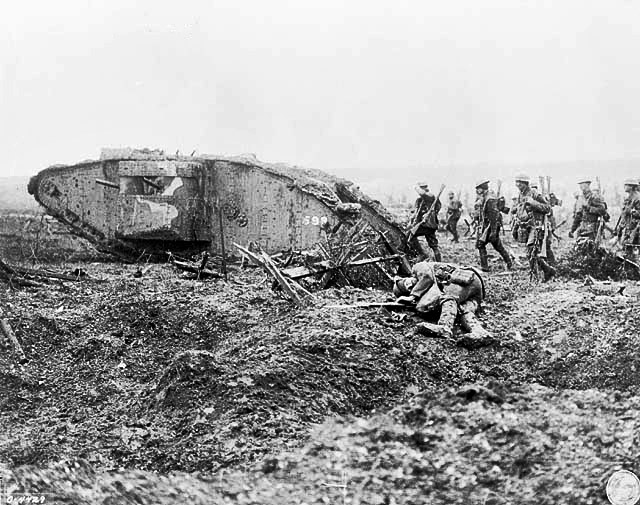
Soldiers of the 2nd Canadian Division behind a Mark II female tank during the Battle of Vimy Ridge

The first significant overseas deployment of Canadian military forces occurred during the Second Boer War when several units were raised to serve under British command. Similarly, when the United Kingdom entered into conflict with Germany in the First World War, Canadian troops were called to participate in European theatres. Battles that are particularly notable to the Canadian military include the Second Battle of Ypres, the Battle of the Somme, the Battle of Vimy Ridge, the Second Battle of Passchendaele, as well as a series of attacks undertaken by the Canadian Corps during the Hundred Days Offensive.

During this period, a distinctly Canadian army and navy were established, followed by an air force, that, because of the constitutional arrangements at the time, remained effectively under the control of the British government until Canada gained legislative independence from the United Kingdom in 1931, in part due to the distinguished achievement and sacrifice of the Canadian Corps in the First World War. In November 1940, the Canadian militia was formally renamed the Canadian Army. However, in the 1950s, Reserve Army forces were once again referred to in official documentation as "Militia", which, although rare, is still used to refer to part-time members.

Canadian Forces entered the Second World War in September 1939, after the Canadian Crown-in-Council declared war on Nazi Germany. Battles and campaigns during the Second World War that was particularly notable to the Canadian military include the Battle of the Atlantic, the Battle of Britain, the Battle of Hong Kong, the Dieppe Raid, the invasion of Sicily and Italy, Operation Overlord, the Siegfried Line Campaign, Operation Veritable, as well as the strategic bombing of German cities.

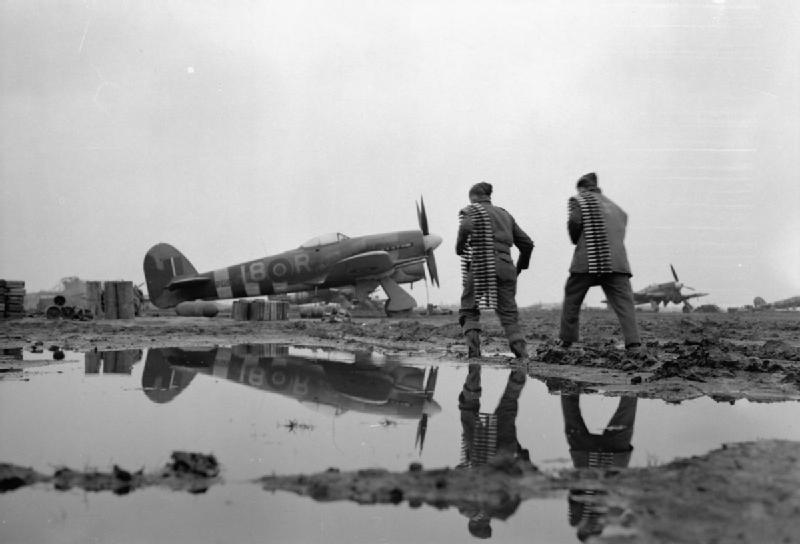
Two armourers of No. 440 Squadron RCAF, re-arming a Hawker Typhoon. By the end of the Second World War, Canada possessed the fourth-largest air force in the world.

Conscription for overseas service was introduced only near the end of WWII, and only 2,400 conscripts made it into battle. At the end of the Second World War, Canada possessed the fourth-largest air force and fifth-largest naval surface fleet in the world. At one point, Canada was thought to have the third-largest navy in the world, but with the fall of the Soviet Union, new data based on Japanese and Soviet sources found that to be incorrect.

Since 1947, Canadian military units have participated in more than 200 military operations in the world, and completed 72 international operations. Canadian soldiers, sailors, and aviators have served alongside other NATO countries during conflicts such as the Korean War, First Gulf War, Kosovo War, and have participated in United Nations peacekeeping operations, such as during the Suez Crisis, Golan Heights, Cyprus, Croatia, Bosnia, Afghanistan, and Libya.

The Canadian Navy operated an aircraft carrier, HMCS Bonaventure, from 1957 to 1970 during the Cold War. It never engaged in combat but participated in patrols during the Cuban Missile Crisis.

=== Since unification ===
The current iteration of the Canadian Armed Forces dates from 1 February 1968, when the Royal Canadian Navy, Canadian Army, and Royal Canadian Air Force were merged into a unified structure and superseded by elemental commands, known as Air Command, Land Force, and Maritime Command. On 16 August 2011, the names for the three elemental commands were reverted to their historical predecessors, although the unified structure of the Canadian Armed Forces was maintained.

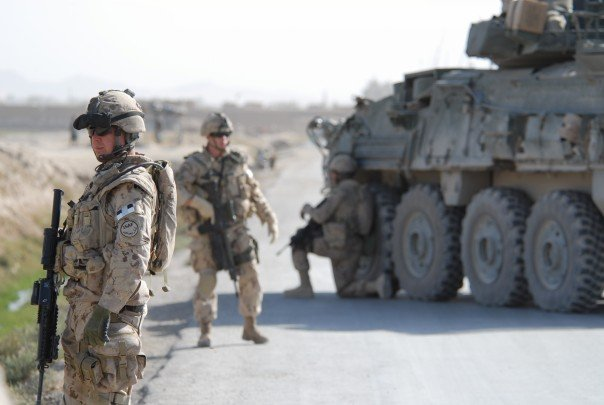
Soldiers from the Canadian Grenadier Guards in Afghanistan. The Canadian Forces were in Afghanistan as a part of the NATO-led United Nations International Security Assistance Force until 2011.

Deployment of Land Forces during this period has included NATO efforts in Europe, peacekeeping operations within United Nations-sanctioned conflicts and combat missions. The Canadian Forces deployed in Afghanistan until 2011, under the NATO-led United Nations International Security Assistance Force (ISAF), at the request of the Government of Afghanistan.

The Forces have also deployed domestically to provide aid during emergencies and natural disasters. Over 8,500 military personnel were sent to Manitoba after the 1997 Red River flood to help with evacuation, building dikes, and other flood-fighting efforts. The operation was considered a "public relations bonanza" for the military. The Forces were also deployed after the North American ice storm of 1998, with relief efforts beginning on 8 January, after the provinces of New Brunswick, Ontario, and Quebec requested aid. Over 16,000 troops were deployed, making it the largest deployment of troops ever to serve on Canadian soil in response to a natural disaster, and the largest operational deployment of Canadian military personnel since the Korean War. The Forces were also deployed to British Columbia from 3 August to 16 September 2003, as a part of Operation Peregrine. The operation was conducted after the province was overwhelmed by 800 separate forest fires, and the provincial government requested federal aid. Over 2,200 soldiers were mobilized, and at its height, more than 2,600 military personnel participated in the 45-day operation.

==== Early 2000s modernization efforts ====
The Constitution of Canada gives the federal government exclusive responsibility for national defence, and expenditures are thus outlined in the federal budget. For the 2007–2010 fiscal year, the amount allocated for defence spending was CA$6.15 billion which is 1.4 percent of the country's GDP. This regular funding was augmented in 2005 with an additional CA$12.5 billion over five years, as well as a commitment to increasing regular force troop levels by 5,000 persons, and the primary reserve by 4,500 over the same period. It was further augmented in 2010, with another CA$5.3 billion over five years being provided to allow for 13,000 more regular force members, and 10,000 more primary reserve personnel, as well as CA$17.1 billion for the purchase of new trucks for the Canadian Army, transport aircraft and helicopters for the Royal Canadian Air Force, and joint support ships for the Royal Canadian Navy.

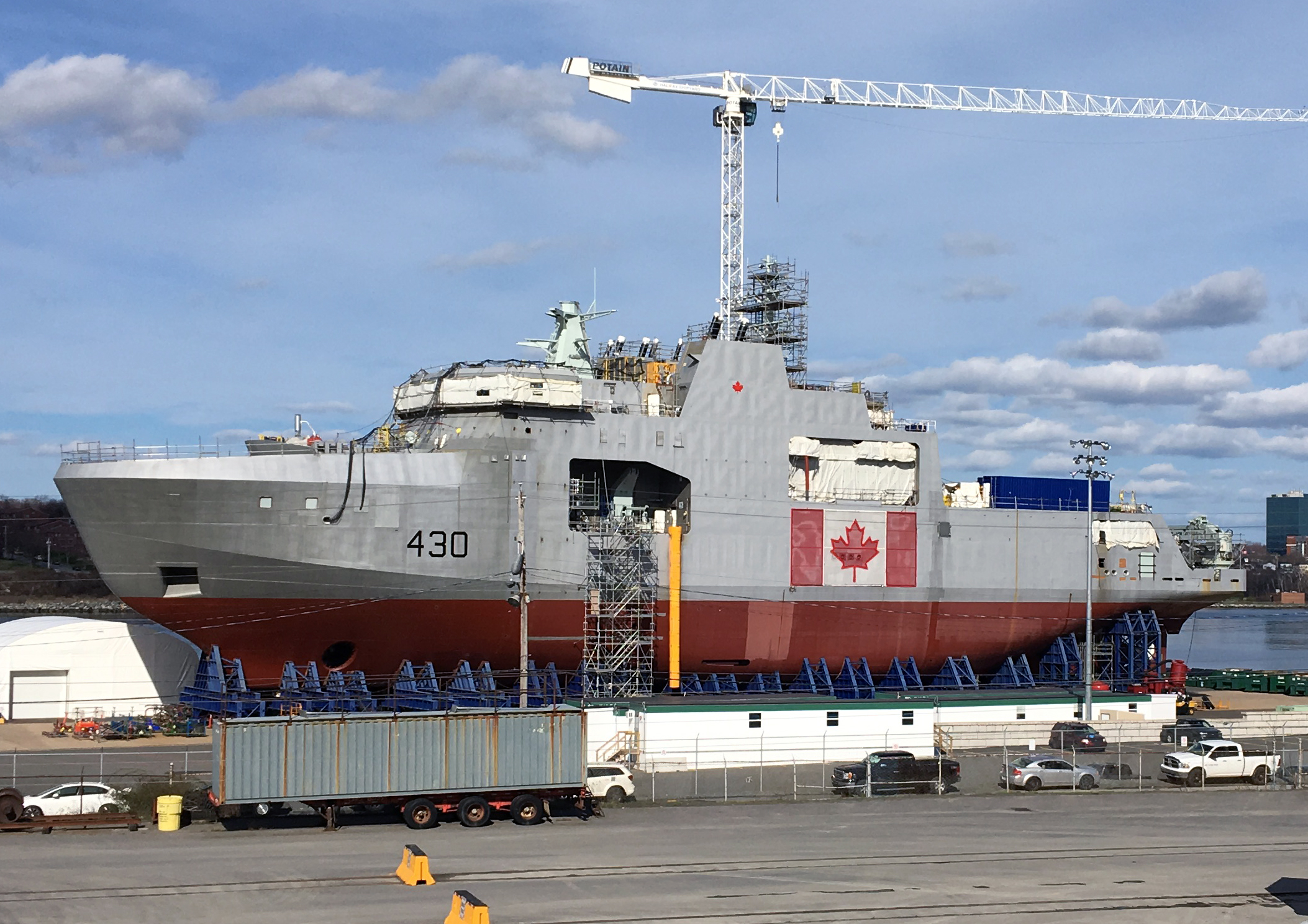
Construction of a Harry DeWolf-class offshore patrol vessel at Halifax Shipyard in 2018. The ship emerged from the Arctic Patrol Ship project.

In 2008, the Government of Canada began efforts, through the "Canada First Defence Strategy", to modernize the Forces, through the purchase of new equipment, improved training and readiness, as well as the establishment of the Canadian Special Operations Regiment. More funds were also put towards recruitment, which had been dwindling throughout the 1980s and 1990s, possibly because the Canadian populace had come to perceive the Forces as peacekeepers rather than as soldiers, as shown in a 2008 survey conducted by the Department of National Defence. The poll found that nearly two-thirds of Canadians agreed with the country's participation in the invasion of Afghanistan, and that the military should be stronger, but also that the purpose of the forces should be different, such as more focused on responding to natural disasters. Then Chief of Defence Staff (CDS) Walter Natynczyk said later that year that, while recruiting has become more successful, the Forces was facing a problem with its rate of loss of existing members, which increased between 2006 and 2008 from 6% to 9.2% annually.

Renewal and re-equipment efforts have resulted in the acquisition of specific equipment (main battle tanks, artillery, unmanned air vehicles and other systems) to support the mission in Afghanistan. It has also encompassed initiatives to renew certain so-called "core capabilities" (such as the air force's medium-range transport aircraft fleet—the C-130 Hercules—and the army's truck and armoured vehicle fleets). In addition, new systems (such as C-17 Globemaster III strategic transport aircraft and CH-47 Chinook heavy-lift helicopters) have also been acquired for the Forces.

=== Peacekeeping ===
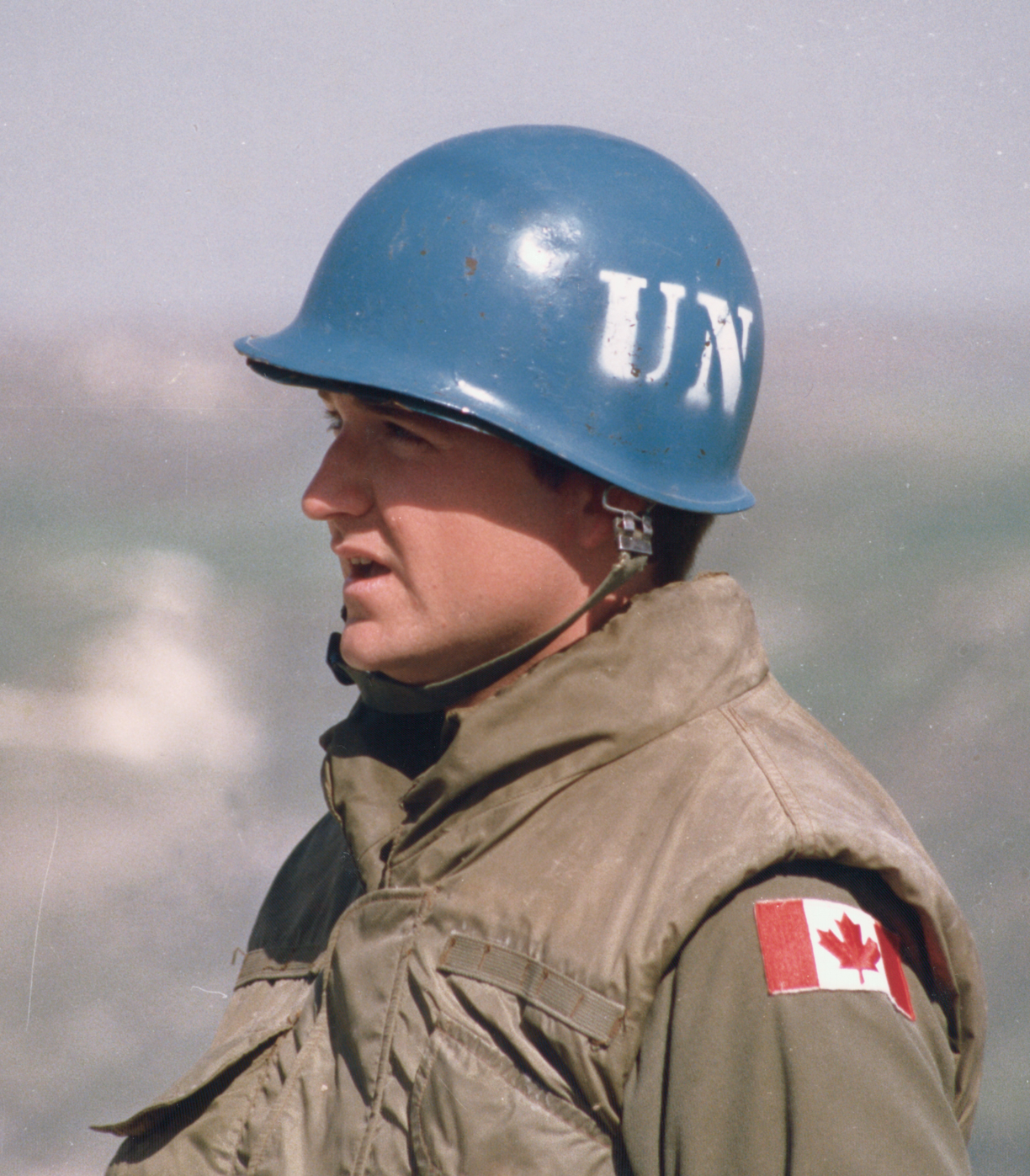
Canadian peacekeeper in 1976 wearing the distinctive flag of Canada and UN blue helmet

Canada has served in over 50 peacekeeping missions, including every United Nations peacekeeping effort from its inception until 1989. More than 125,000 Canadians have served in international peacekeeping operations, with approximately 130 Canadians having died during these operations. Canada's support for multilateralism and internationalism has been closely related to its peacekeeping efforts. Canada actively promotes its domestically shared values such as democracy, human rights, diversity, and the rule of law, through its foreign affairs engagements.

Canada's role in the development of and participation in peacekeeping during the 20th century led to its reputation as a positive middle power. Canada's successful role in mediating the 1956 Suez Canal Crisis gave it credibility and established it as a country fighting for the common good of all nations. The Canadian public came to identify the nation's peacekeeping role as the country's top contribution in international affairs.

Canada faced controversy over its involvement in some peacekeeping efforts resulting in a military reassessment in the late 1990s. By the 21st century, Canadian direct participation in UN peacekeeping efforts greatly declined, with its military participation reallocated to UN-sanctioned operations through the North Atlantic Treaty Organization (NATO). This military reallocation resulted in a shift towards more militarized and deadly missions, rather than traditional peacekeeping duties.

=== Role of women ===
In the 1950s, the recruitment of women was open to roles in medicine, communication, logistics, and administration. The roles of women in the CAF began to expand in 1971 after the department reviewed the recommendations of the Royal Commission on the Status of Women, at which time it lifted the ceiling of 1,500 women personnel, and gradually expanded employment opportunities into the non-traditional areas—vehicle drivers and mechanics, aircraft mechanics, air-traffic controllers, military police, and firefighters.

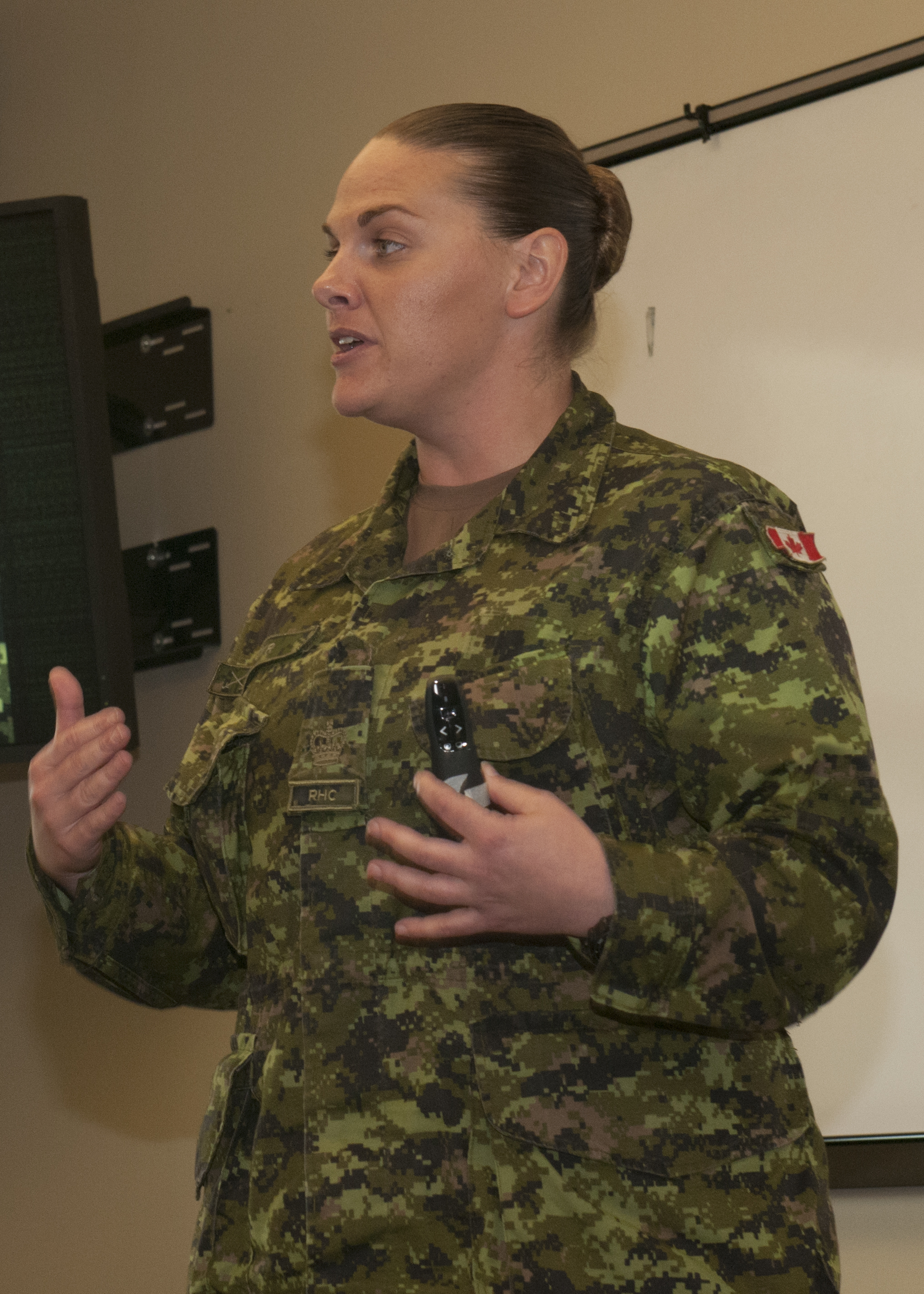
A member of the CAF briefs Vermont Army National Guard soldiers on the integration of women into the forces

The department further reviewed personnel policies in 1978 and 1985, after Parliament passed the Canadian Human Rights Act and the Canadian Charter of Rights and Freedoms. As a result of these reviews, the department changed its policies to permit women to serve at sea in replenishment ships and a diving tender, with the army service battalions, in military police platoons and field ambulance units, and most air squadrons.

In 1987, occupations and units with the primary role of preparing for direct involvement in combat on the ground or at sea were still closed to women: infantry, armoured corps, field artillery, air defence artillery, signals, field engineers, and naval operations. On 5 February 1987, the minister of national defence created an office to study the impact of employing men and women in combat units. These trials were called Combat-Related Employment of Women.

All military occupations were open to women in 1989, except submarine service, which opened in 2000. Throughout the 1990s, the introduction of women into the combat arms increased the potential recruiting pool by about 100 percent. Women were fully integrated into all occupations and roles by the government of Jean Chrétien, and by 8 March 2000, even allowed to serve on submarines.

All equipment must be suitable for a mixed-gender force. Combat helmets, rucksacks, combat boots, and flak jackets are designed to ensure women have the same level of protection and comfort as their male colleagues. Women's uniforms are similar in design to men's uniforms, but conform to the female figure, and are functional and practical. Women are also provided with an annual financial entitlement for the purchase of bras.

In March 2021, Lieutenant-Colonel Eleanor Taylor resigned citing sexual misconduct among the top brass. Since then, the CAF has been under pressure over allegations of sexual misconduct. Former justice Louise Arbour, who was tasked to lead a probe into military harassment and sexual misconduct claims in CAF in 2021, issued 48 recommendations to change the culture of the CAF. She said that she saw no basis for the CAF to retain the jurisdiction over sexual offences as it has not improved efficiency, discipline and morale.

== Structure ==
The Crown has long occupied a central position in the Canadian Armed Forces. The National Defence Act states that "the Canadian Forces are the armed forces of Her Majesty raised by Canada, consisting of one service called the Canadian Armed Forces" and the Constitution Act, 1867, vests command-in-chief of the Forces in the country's sovereign, who, since 1904, has authorized his or her viceroy, the governor general, to exercise the duties ascribed to the post of commander-in-chief and, since 1905, hold the associated title. All troop deployment and disposition orders, including declarations of war, fall within the royal prerogative. They previously were issued as orders-in-Council, which must be signed by either the monarch or governor general, but since 1992 deployments have been authorised by the cabinet (until 2003) or by a letter of the prime minister. Under the Westminster system's parliamentary customs and practices, however, the monarch and viceroy must generally follow the advice of his or her ministers in Cabinet, including the prime minister and minister of national defence, who are accountable to the elected House of Commons.

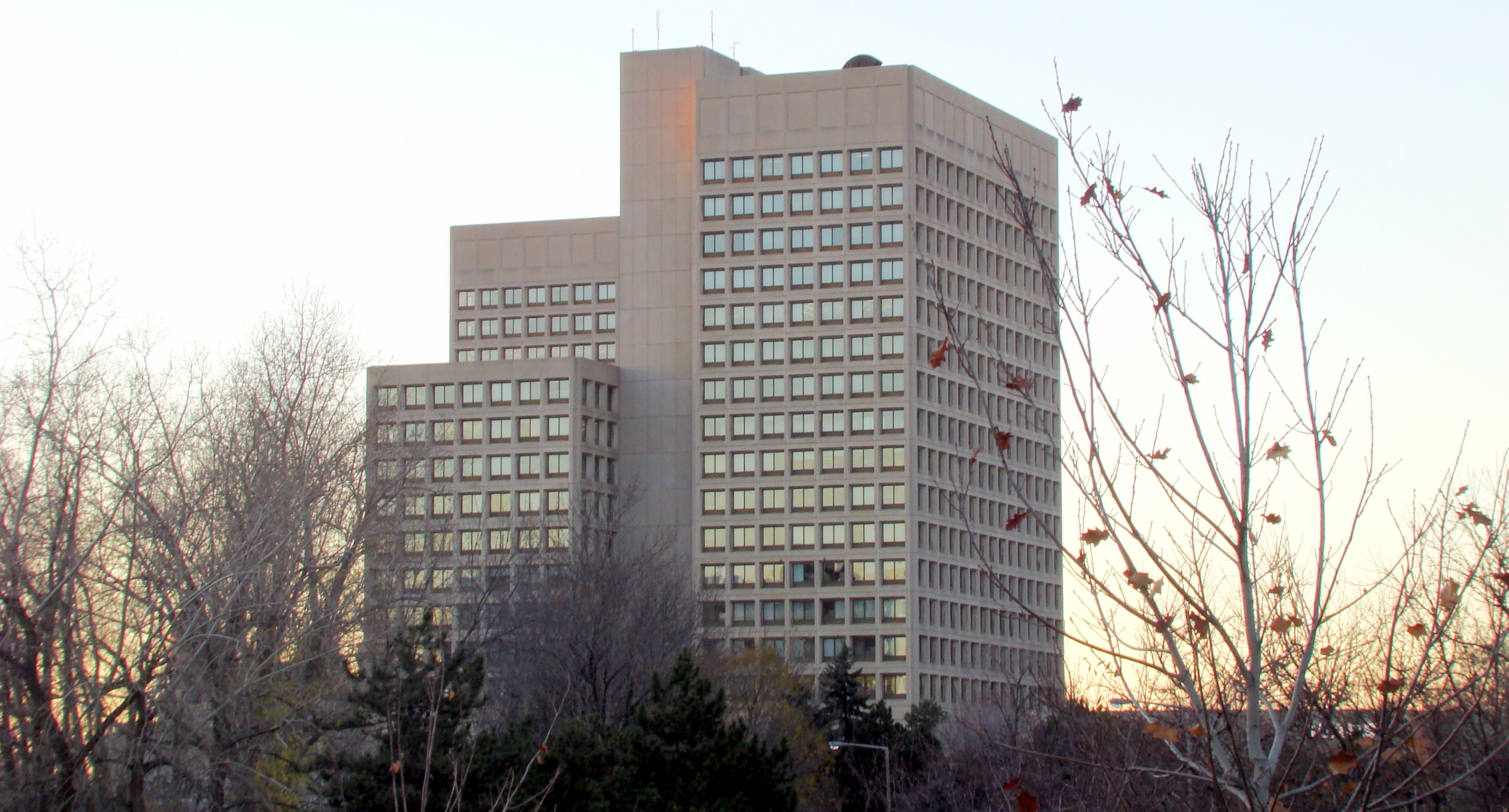
The Armed Forces Council is the senior military body of the Canadian Forces. The Council typically operates from Pearkes building in Ottawa.

The Canadian Forces' 92,600 personnel are divided into a hierarchy of numerous ranks of officers and non-commissioned members. The governor general appoints, on the advice of the prime minister, the chief of the Defence Staff (CDS) as the highest-ranking commissioned officer in the Armed Forces and its commander. In this role, the CDS heads the Armed Forces Council, which also includes the vice chief of the Defence Staff and the commanders of the Royal Canadian Navy, Canadian Army, Royal Canadian Air Force, Canadian Joint Operations Command, Canadian Special Operations Forces Command, as well as certain other designated personnel. The Armed Forces Council generally operates from National Defence Headquarters (NDHQ) in Ottawa, Ontario. The sovereign and most other members of the Canadian Royal Family also act as colonels-in-chief, honorary air commodores, air commodores-in-chief, admirals, and captains-general of Canadian Forces units, though these positions are ceremonial.

The Canadian Forces operate out of 27 Canadian Forces bases (CFB) across the country, including NDHQ. This number has been gradually reduced since the 1970s with bases either being closed or merged. Both officers and non-commissioned members receive their basic training at the Canadian Forces Leadership and Recruit School in Saint-Jean-sur-Richelieu. Officers will generally either directly enter the Canadian Armed Forces with a degree from a civilian university or receive their commission upon graduation from the Royal Military College of Canada. Specific element and trade training is conducted at a variety of institutions throughout Canada, and to a lesser extent, the world.

As of 2013, the Canadian Forces have 68,000 Regular Force members and 27,000 reservists, bringing the total force to approximately 95,000. These individuals serve on numerous Canadian Forces bases in all regions of the country and are governed by the Queen's Regulations and Orders and the National Defence Act.

=== Canadian Army ===
The Canadian Army is the land component of the Canadian Armed Forces, organized into five geographic divisions that command brigade groups and their subordinate combat and support units, enabling the generation and deployment of land forces for domestic and international operations.

Name	Region	Units	Headquarters
2nd Canadian Division	Quebec	5 CMBG, 34 CBG, 35 CBG,	2 CDSB Valcartier, Detachment Montreal
3rd Canadian Division	Western Canada	1 CMBG, 38 CBG, 39 CBG, 41 CBG,	3 CDSB Edmonton
4th Canadian Division	Ontario	2 CMBG, 31 CBG, 32 CBG, 33 CBG,	Denison Armoury
5th Canadian Division	Atlantic Canada	6 CCSB, 36 CBG, 37 CBG	CFB Halifax
Canadian Army Doctrine and Training Centre			CFB Kingston

=== Royal Canadian Navy ===
The Royal Canadian Navy is the maritime component of the Canadian Armed Forces, organized into two operational fleets, Atlantic and Pacific supported by naval aviation, training, and shore-based establishments, and responsible for generating and deploying naval forces for domestic and international operations.

Name	Region	Units	Headquarters
Naval Staff Headquarters			NDHQ Carling
Maritime Forces Pacific (MARPAC)	Pacific Ocean		CFB Esquimalt
Maritime Forces Atlantic (MARANT)	Atlantic Ocean		CFB Halifax
Naval Reserve Headquarters	Canada		Quebec City

=== Royal Canadian Air Force ===
The Royal Canadian Air Force is the air and space component of the Canadian Armed Forces, organized into numbered air divisions and wings that command flying squadrons and support units, enabling the generation and employment of air power for domestic and international operations.

==== 1 Canadian Air Division (CAD) ====
Name	Mission	Units	Headquarters
1 Wing Kingston	Integrated tactical aviation support	400 THS, 403 HOTS, 408 THS, 430 THS, 438 THS, 450 THS	CFB Kingston
2 Wing Bagotville	RCAF’s air expeditionary wing	2 MSS, 2 AETS, 2 OSS, 4 CES, 8 ACCS, 2 ASOS, 14 CES	CFB Bagotville
3 Wing Bagotville	General purpose, multi-role, combat capable forces	425 TFS, 433 TFS, 439 CSS, 12 RS, 3 AMS, 3 Wing ARF, FOL Iqaluit	CFB Bagotville
4 Wing Cold Lake	General purpose, multi-role, combat capable forces	401 TFS, 409 TFS, 417 CSS, 410 TFOTS, 419 TFTS, 42 RS, 10 FTTS, 1 AMS, 4 Wing ARF, FOL Inuvik, FOL Yellowknife	CFB Cold Lake
5 Wing Goose Bay	NORAD operations, power projection	444 CSS, 5 Wing ARF, FOL Goose Bay	CFB Goose Bay
8 Wing Trenton	Aerial refueling, tactical and strategic airlift, search and rescue, VIP transportation	CFS Alert, 426 TTS, 424 TRS, 429 TS, 436 TS, 437 TS, 412 TS, 440 TS, 8 AMS, 8 Wing ARF,	CFB Trenton
9 Wing Gander	Search and rescue	103 SRS, 9 Wing ARF	CFB Gander
12 Wing Shearwater	Naval aviation	406 Maritime Operational Training Squadron, 423 Maritime Helicopter Squadron, 443 Maritime Helicopter Squadron	CFB Halifax
14 Wing Greenwood	Long range patrol, search and rescue	404 LRPTS, 415 LRPFDS, 405 LRPS, 413 TRS, 14 AMS, 14 Wing ARF, 91 CEF, 143 CEF, 144 CEF	CFB Greenwood
19 Wing Comox	Long range patrol, search and rescue	CFSSAR, 418 SROTS, 435 TRS, 442 TRS, 407 LRPS, 19 AMS, 19 Wing ARF, 192 CEF	CFB Comox
22 Wing North Bay	Surveillance, identification, control and warning	21 ACWS, 51 ACWOTS, Det 2, 1st AF (USAF), 22 Wing ARF	CFB North Bay

==== 2 Canadian Air Division (2 CAD) ====
Name	Mission	Units	Headquarters
15 Wing Moose Jaw	Aircrew training	2 CFFTS, 3 CFFTS, 15 ATC Sqn, 431 ADS	CFB Moose Jaw
16 Wing Borden	Technical training, aerospace control and professional development.	RCAF Academy, CFSATE, CFSACO, 16 Wing ARF	CFB Borden
17 Wing Winnipeg	Specialized education	402 Sqn, RCAF Band, RCAFWCWGB Aerospace College, CFSSAT	CFB Winnipeg

==== 3 Canadian Space Division (3 CSD) ====
Name	Mission	Units	Headquarters
7 Wing (Space)	Space operations	7 SOS, 7 OSS	Ottawa, ON

==== Royal Canadian Air Force Aerospace Warfare Centre (RCAF AWC) ====
Name	Mission	Units	Headquarters
414 Electronic Warfare Support Squadron	Electronic warfare		CFB Trenton
434 Operational Test and Evaluation Squadron	Test and evaluation		CFB Trenton
Air and Space Power Development Centre	Development		CFB Trenton
Centre for Operational Research and Analysis	Research		CFB Trenton
RCAF History and Heritage	History and Heritage		CFB Trenton

=== Canadian Special Operations Forces Command ===
Canadian Special Operations Forces Command (CANSOFCOM) is a unified operational command of the Canadian Armed Forces that oversees Canada’s special operations capabilities.

Name	Mission
Joint Task Force 2	Counter Terrorism
Canadian Joint Incident Response Unit	CBRN defense
Canadian Special Operations Regiment	Special forces
427 Special Operations Aviation Squadron	Special forces
Canadian Special Operations Training Centre	Training

=== Canadian Forces Intelligence Command ===
Canadian Forces Intelligence Command (CFINTCOM) provides integrated defence intelligence capabilities, products and services to support Canada’s national security objectives.

Name	Mission	Headquarters
Canadian Forces Joint Imagery Centre	Imagery intelligence	
Canadian Forces National Counter-Intelligence Unit	Counterintelligence	
Joint Meteorological Centre (Canada)	Weather-related information	
Mapping and Charting Establishment (Canada)	Geospatial information and geomatics.	
Joint Task Force X	Human intelligence	

=== Canadian Joint Operations Command ===
Canadian Joint Operations Command (CJOC) leads most Canadian Armed Forces (CAF) operations in Canada, North America, and around the world.

Name	Region	Command	Headquarters
Joint Task Force (North)	Northern Canada	Comd JTF(N)	CFNA HQ Yellowknife
Joint Task Force (Pacific)	British Columbia	Comd MARPAC	CFB Esquimalt
Joint Task Force (West)	Canadian Prairies	Comd 3rd Can Div	3 CDSB Edmonton
Joint Task Force (Central)	Ontario	Comd 4th Can Div	Denison Armoury
Joint Task Force (East)	Quebec	Comd 2nd Can Div	2 CDSB Valcartier, Detachment Montreal
Joint Task Force (Atlantic)	Atlantic Canada	Comd MARANT	CFB Halifax
Canadian Joint Warfare Centre	Canada	Comd CJWC	NDHQ Carling
1st Canadian Division	Expeditionary	Comd 1st Can Div	CFB Kingston

=== Military Personnel Command ===
Military Personnel Command (MILPERSCOM) provides functional direction and guidance to the Canadian Armed Forces on all matters pertaining to the management of military personnel.

Name	Mission	Units	Headquarters
Canadian Defence Academy			
Canadian Forces Health Services Group			
Canadian Forces Recruiting Group			
Canadian Armed Forces Transition Group			

=== Vice Chief of the Defence Staff ===
The Vice Chief of the Defence Staff ensures that Department of National Defence policy and strategic objectives are achieved. They govern the National Defence headquarters, and all HQ activities

Name	Mission	Units	Headquarters
Canadian Forces Military Police Group		N MP Gp, CA MP Gp, AF MP Gp, SOF MPU, CFPSU, CFNIS,	
Canadian Forces Support Unit (Ottawa)			
Cadets and Junior Canadian Rangers			

== Personnel ==
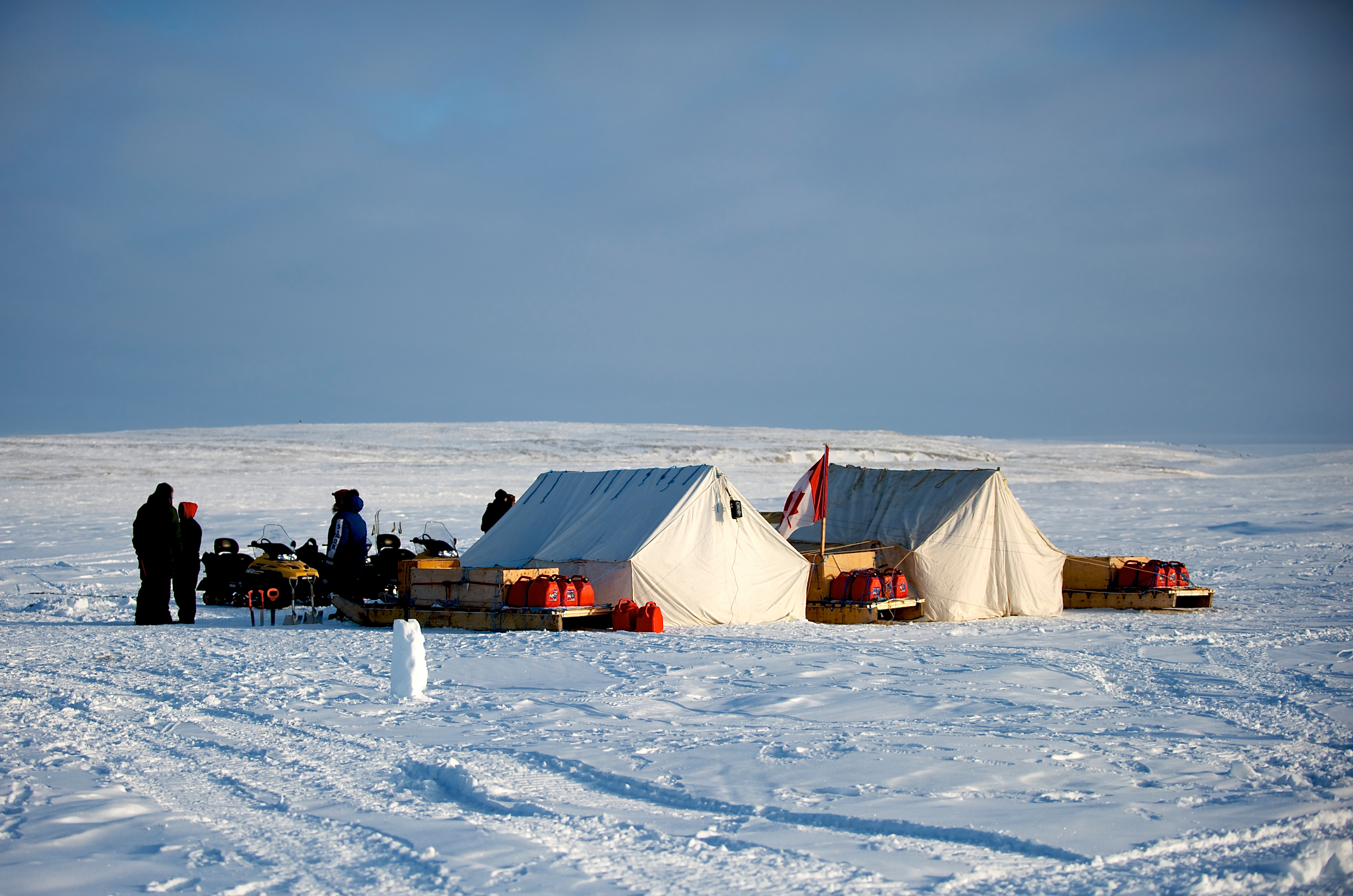
A Canadian Rangers training camp in Alert, Nunavut. The Canadian Rangers are a sub-component of the Canadian Armed Forces reserve force.

The personnel of the Canadian Armed Forces are divided into several employment types and environmental identities that help organize the military structure and define the roles of its members. Personnel may serve in the Regular Force, which consists of full-time military members, or in the Reserve Force, which includes part-time personnel who train and serve while often maintaining civilian careers or education.

CAF Members
Component	Actual	Authorized
Regular Force	67,827	71,500
Primary Reserve	32,444	38,800

=== Environment ===
Members of the Canadian Armed Forces belong to environment (element) of the Royal Canadian Navy, Canadian Army, or Royal Canadian Air Force. A members environment can be determined by their job, branch, or other. Members of the Canadian Armed Force are in "Purple Trades", meaning they can work in any environment of the CAF. For example, a cook that wears the uniform of the Royal Canadian Navy can find themselves working in a field kitchen with the army and a Supply Technician who wears the Air Force uniform can be employed in a navy ship.

CAF Members by Environment
Environment	# of personnel
Air Force	22,138
Army	57,176
Navy	15,203

=== Component ===
The Reserve Force of the Canadian Armed Forces is made up of several components: the Primary Reserve (part-time trained members who can support operations), the Canadian Rangers (who provide presence in remote and northern areas), the Supplementary Reserve (former members who can be recalled if needed), and COATS/Cadet Instructor Cadre (personnel who support and train cadets). Together, these components support and expand the Regular Force when required.

==== Regular Force ====
The Regular Force (Reg Force) of the Canadian Armed Forces is the full-time component of Canada’s military, made up of members who serve continuously and can be deployed at any time in Canada or abroad. Personnel serve in the Army, Navy, or Air Force in a wide range of operational and support roles, and they receive full-time pay, benefits, and ongoing training to maintain readiness.

==== Reserve Force ====
The Reserve Force (Res Force) can be divided into four sub-compondents

- Primary Reserve (PRes)
- Supplementary Reserve (Supp Res)
- Cadet Organizations Administration and Training Service (COATS)
- Canadian Rangers

===== Primary Reserve =====
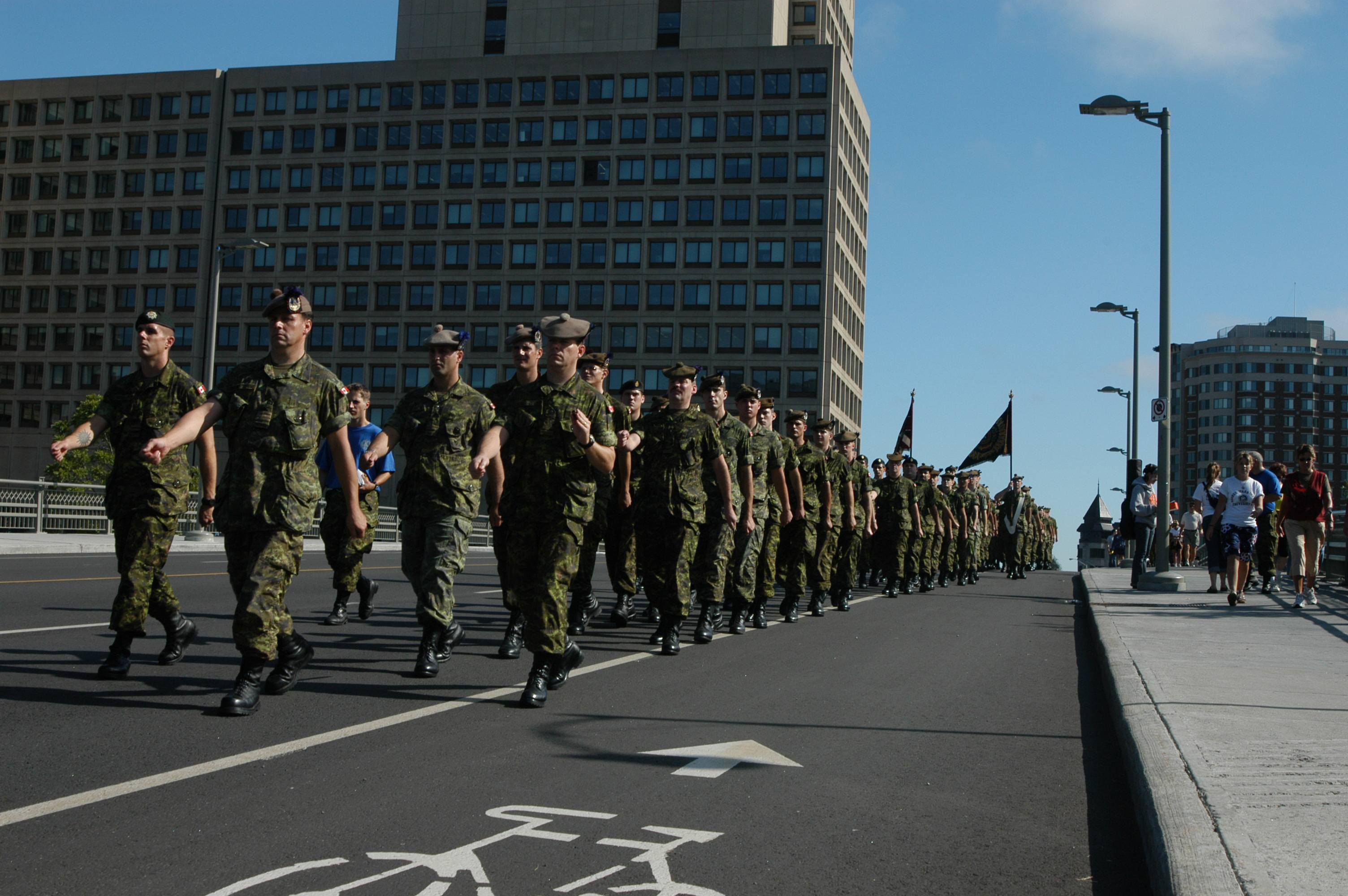
Members of the Cameron Highlanders of Ottawa, an infantry regiment of the Primary Reserve, march through Ottawa, Ontario

Approximately 26,000 soldiers, sailors, and airmen, trained to the level of and interchangeable with their Regular Force counterparts, and posted to CAF operations or duties on a casual or ongoing basis, make up the Primary Reserve. This group is represented, though not commanded, at NDHQ by the chief of Reserves and Employer Support, who is usually a major-general or rear-admiral, and is divided into four components that are each operationally and administratively responsible to its corresponding environmental command in the Regular Force—the Naval Reserve (NAVRES), Land Force Reserve (LFR), and Air Reserve (AIRRES)—in addition to one force that does not fall under an environmental command, the Health Services Reserve under the Canadian Forces Health Services Group.

===== Cadet Organizations Administration and Training Service =====
The Cadet Organizations Administration and Training Service (COATS) consists of officers and non-commissioned members who conduct training, safety, supervision and administration of nearly 60,000 cadets aged 12 to 18 years in the Canadian Cadet Organization. The majority of members in COATS are officers of the Cadet Instructors Cadre (CIC) branch of the CAF. Members of the Reserve Force Sub-Component COATS who are not employed part-time (Class A) or full-time (Class B) may be held on the "Cadet Instructor Supplementary Staff List" (CISS List) in anticipation of employment in the same manner as other reservists are held as members of the Supplementary Reserve.

===== Supplementary Reserve =====
The Supplementary Reserve of the Canadian Armed Forces is a sub-component of the Reserve Force made up of former Regular Force or Reserve members who are not actively training or serving but can be called upon in times of need. Members do not parade or receive regular pay, but they remain on a list of trained personnel who may be reactivated to support operations, emergencies, or surges in manpower when required.

===== Canadian Rangers =====
The Canadian Rangers, who provide surveillance and patrol services in Canada's arctic and other remote areas, are an essential reserve force component of approximately 5,000 members organized across five regional patrol groups. They play a vital role in national security, public safety operations, and the exercise of Canadian sovereignty.

=== Personnel Branches ===
Personnel branches in the Canadian Armed Forces are occupational groupings that organize members by their trade, specialty, and professional function rather than by Army, Navy, or Air Force. Each branch brings together personnel who perform similar roles across different environments, such as combat arms, engineering, aviation, logistics, intelligence, medical, and training support. Examples include the Air Operations Branch, Royal Canadian Armoured Corps, Royal Regiment of Canadian Artillery, Military Engineers Branch, and Cadet Instructors Cadre. These branches help standardize training, career progression, traditions, and professional development, ensuring members with similar skills are managed consistently across the CAF.

Order of Precedence
Branch	Element	Home Station
Naval Operations Branch	RCN	
Royal Canadian Armoured Corps	Army	
Royal Regiment of Canadian Artillery	Army	CFB Shilo
Military Engineer Branch	Army (Corps of Royal Canadian Engineers), RCAF	Arcadia, NB
Communications and Electronics Branch	Army (Royal Canadian Corps of Signals), RCAF, RCN	CFB Kingston
Royal Canadian Infantry Corps	Army	
Air Operations Branch	RCAF	
Royal Canadian Logistics Service	Army, RCAF, RCN	CFB Borden
Royal Canadian Medical Service	Army, RCAF, RCN	CFB Borden
Royal Canadian Dental Corps	Army	
Corps of Royal Canadian Electrical and Mechanical Engineers	Army	CFB Borden
Royal Canadian Chaplain Service	Army, RCAF, RCN	
Military Police Branch	Army, RCAF, RCN	
Legal Branch	Army, RCAF, RCN	
Music Branch	Army, RCAF, RCN	
Personnel Selection Branch	Army, RCAF, RCN	
Training Development Branch	Army, RCAF, RCN	
Public Affairs Branch	Army, RCAF, RCN	
Intelligence Branch	Army, RCAF, RCN	
Cadet Instructors Cadre	Army, RCAF, RCN	
Special Operations Forces Branch	Army, RCAF, RCN	CFB Petawawa

== Canadian Military Bases ==
Canada operates a network of military bases across the country that support the Canadian Armed Forces’ operational, training, and logistical needs. These bases include Army garrisons, Royal Canadian Navy (RCN) facilities, and Royal Canadian Air Force (RCAF) stations, many of which host joint operations, specialized training programs, and strategic deployments in support of national defence and international missions.

National Defence Headquarters
Campus	Location
National Defence Headquarters Carling	West Ottawa, ON
Major-General George R. Pearkes Building	Ottawa, ON

Canadian Forces Bases / Garrisons
Base	Primary Unit(s)	Location
2 Canadian Division Support Base (2 CDSB) Valcartier	5 Canadian Mechanized Brigade Group	Saint-Gabriel-de-Valcartier, QC
2 CDSB Valcartier Detachment (Det) Montreal	34 Canadian Brigade Group,	Montreal, QC
3 CDSB Edmonton	3rd Canadian Division	Edmonton, AB
3 CDSB Edmonton Det Wainwright	Canadian Manoeuvre Training Centre, 3rd Canadian Division	Wainwright, AB
5 CDSB Gagetown	5th Canadian Division, Combat Training Centre	Gagetown, NB
5 CDSB Gagetown Det Aldershot		Gagetown, NB
Canadian Forces Base (CFB) Bagotville	3 Wing Bagotville, 2 Wing Bagotville	La Baie, QC
CFB Borden	16 Wing Borden	Borden, ON
CFB Cold Lake	4 Wing Cold Lake	Cold Lake, AB
CFB Comox	19 Wing Comox	Comox, BC
CFB Esquimalt	Maritime Forces Pacific	Victoria, BC
CFB Gander	9 Wing Gander	Gander, NL
CFB Goose Bay	5 Wing Goose Bay	Goose Bay, NL
CFB Greenwood	14 Wing Greenwood	Greenwood, NS
CFB Kingston	1 Wing Kingston, 1st Canadian Division, Royal Military College of Canada, Canadian Joint Operations Command	CFB Kingston
CFB Moose Jaw	15 Wing Moose Jaw	Moose Jaw, SK
CFB North Bay	22 Wing North Bay, First Air Force	North Bay, ON
CFB Shilo	Royal Regiment of Canadian Artillery, 2 PPCLI	Brandon, MB
CFB Suffield	British Army Training Unit Suffield	Suffield, AB
CFB Trenton	8 Wing Trenton	Trenton, ON
CFB Winnipeg	17 Wing Winnipeg, 1 Canadian Air Division, 2 Canadian Air Division	Winnipeg, MB
CFB Winnipeg Det Dundurn		Winnipeg, MB
CFB Shearwater	12 Wing Shearwater	Shearwater, NS

Canadian Forces Ammunition Depots
Depot	Primary Unit(s)	Location
Canadian Forces Ammunition Depot (CFB) Bedford	Canadian Materiel Support Group	Halifax, NS
CFAD Dundurn	Canadian Materiel Support Group	Dundurn, SK
CFAD Dundurn Detachment Angus	Canadian Materiel Support Group	Essa, ON
CFAD Rocky Point	Canadian Materiel Support Group	Sooke, BC

Other Names
Base	Primary unit(s)	Location
Arundel Castle	12 Wing Shearwater	Victoria, BC
Area Support Unit (ASU) Chilliwack	39 Canadian Brigade Group, 3rd Canadian Division	Chilliwack, BC
ASU Toronto	32 Canadian Brigade Group, 4th Canadian Division	Toronto, ON
Canadian Forces Leadership and Recruit School	Canadian Defence Academy	Saint-Jean-sur-Richelieu, QC
Canadian Forces Maritime Experimental and Test Ranges Nanoose	Royal Canadian Navy	Nanoose Bay, BC
Canadian Forces Northern Area Headquarters Yellowknife	Joint Task Force (North)	Yellowknife, NT
Canadian Forces Support Group Ottawa-Gatineau		National Capital Region
Connaught Ranges and Primary Training Centre		

== Defence policy ==
Since the Second World War, Canadian defence policy has consistently stressed three overarching objectives:

- The defence of Canada itself;
- The defence of North America in co-operation with US forces;
- Contributing to broader international security.

During the Cold War, a principal focus of Canadian defence policy was contributing to the security of Europe in the face of the Soviet military threat. Toward that end, Canadian ground and air forces were based in Europe from the early 1950s until the early 1990s.

However, since the end of the Cold War, as the North Atlantic Treaty Organization (NATO) has moved much of its defence focus "out of area", the Canadian military has also become more deeply engaged in international security operations in various other parts of the world—most notably in Afghanistan from 2002 to 2014.

The basis for current Canadian defence capability objectives was originally set in the Canada First Defence Strategy, introduced by the Harper Government in 2008 but is now updated through the Liberal Government's 2017 defence strategy, Strong, Secure and Engaged (SSE). The SSE pledged greater funding to support the Canadian military (particularly in relation to the National Shipbuilding Procurement Strategy) in its primary tasks related to the defence of Canada, the defence of North America and contributing to global security.

In addition to its core missions, the Canadian Armed Forces also contribute to the conduct of defence diplomacy through a range of activities, including the deployment of Canadian defence attachés, participation in bilateral and multilateral military forums (e.g. the System of Cooperation Among the American Air Forces), ship and aircraft visits, military training and cooperation, and other such outreach and alliance-buiding efforts.

=== Military expenditures ===
The Constitution of Canada gives the federal government exclusive responsibility for national defence, and expenditures are thus outlined in the federal budget. DND’s main estimates for 2023–24 totalled $26.5 billion, including various votes and statutory funding. Operating ($17.9 billion), capital ($6.1 billion), and grants and contributions ($320 million). Most of the budget is allocated to personnel (34%), operating (34%), and capital (22%).

In 2017 the government began to factor in military-related spending from departments such as Veterans Affairs, Public Works, and the Treasury Board when calculating "defence spending". It is believed that this move was made to improve Canada's defence-related NATO reporting metrics.

In 2024 the government announced plans to increase defence spending by $77 billion over twenty years at a rate of 1.76% of GDP. The funds were to be allocated toward new submarines (twelve were planned) and overall force modernisation.

In 2025, the government of Mark Carney announced plans to rapidly increase defence spending to reach the NATO target 2% of GDP by the end of the fiscal year. The plan includes many measures, including increases to pay for Canadian Forces members, acquisition of new equipment for each of the three environmental commands, and the continued support of previously announced procurement projects.

== Uniforms ==
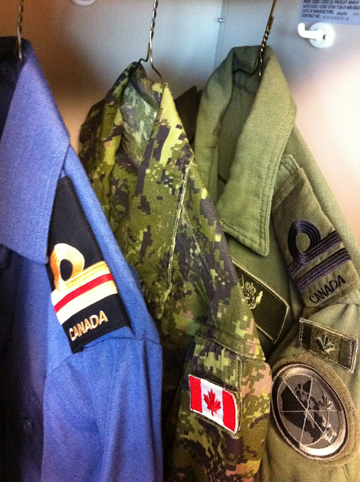
Operational dress uniforms for naval, field and air operations, shown here with naval rank insignia.

Although the Canadian Armed Forces are a single service, there are four similar but distinctive environmental uniforms (DEUs): navy blue (which is actually black) for the navy, rifle green for the army, light blue for the air force, and khaki for special operations. CAF members in operational occupations generally wear the DEU to which their occupation "belongs." CAF members in non-operational occupations (the "purple" trades) are allocated a uniform according to the "distribution" of their branch within the CAF, the association of the branch with one of the former services, and the individual's initial preference. Therefore, on any given day, in any given CAF unit, multiple coloured uniforms may be seen.

The uniforms of the CAF are sub-divided into five orders of dress:

- Ceremonial dress, including regimental full dress, patrol dress, naval high-collar whites, and service-dress uniforms with ceremonial accoutrements such as swords, white web belts, gloves, etc.
- Mess dress, which ranges from full mess kit with mess jacket, cummerbund, or waistcoat, etc., to service dress with bow tie
- Service dress, also called a walking-out or duty uniform, is the military equivalent of the business suit, with an optional white summer uniform for naval CF members
- Operational dress, an originally specialized uniform for wear in an operational environment, is now for everyday wear on base or in garrison
- Occupational dress, which is specialized uniform articles for particular occupations (e.g., medical, dental, firefighter)

Only service dress is suitable for CAF members to wear on any occasion, barring "dirty work" or combat. With gloves, swords, and medals (No. 1 or 1A), it is suitable for ceremonial occasions and "dressed down" (No. 3 or lower), it is suitable for daily wear. Generally, after the elimination of base dress (although still defined for the Air Force uniform), the operational dress is now the daily uniform worn by most members of the CF, unless service dress is prescribed (such as at the NDHQ, on parades, at public events, etc.). Approved parkas are authorized for winter wear in cold climates and a light casual jacket is also authorized for cooler days.

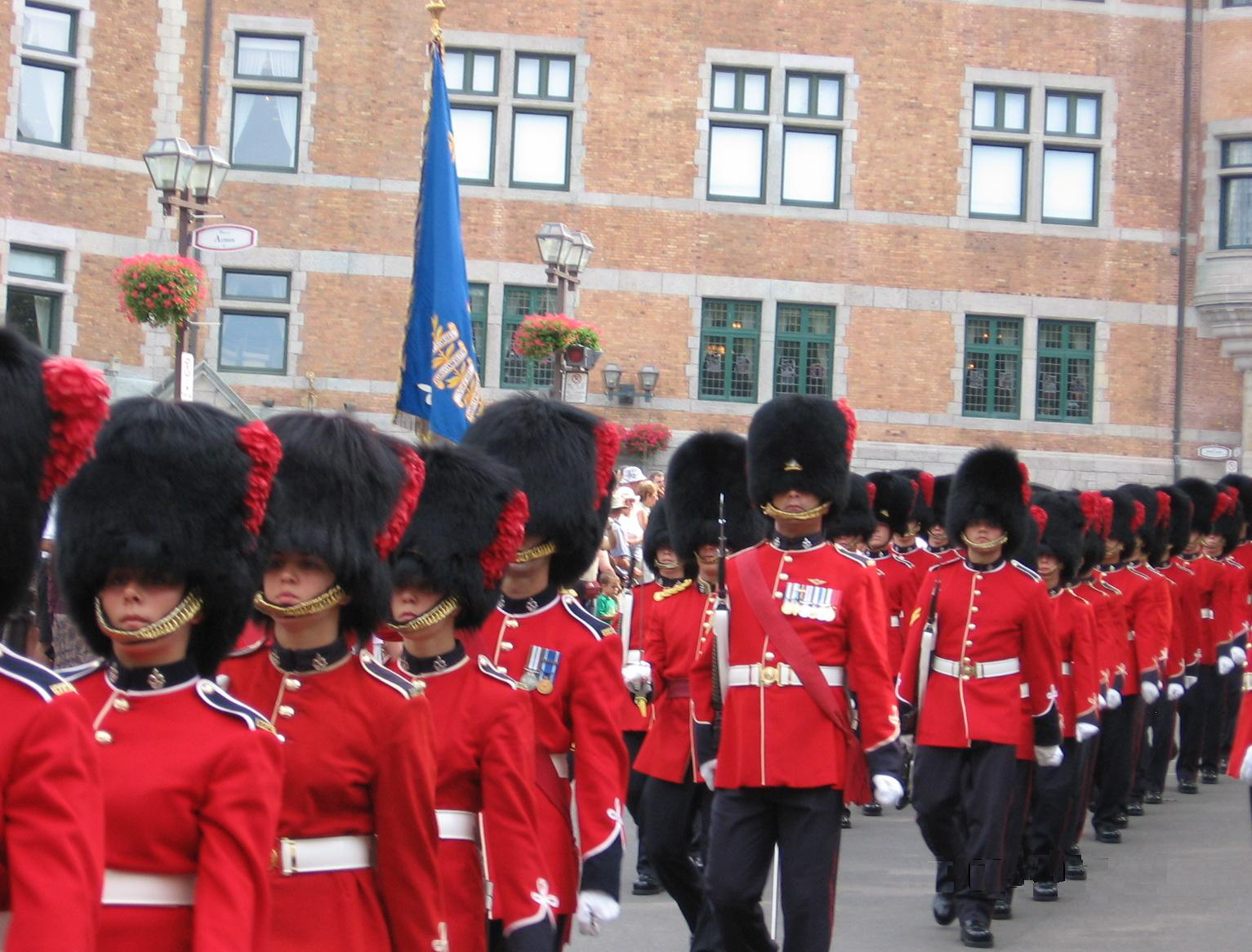
The Royal 22nd Regiment parading in full dress for the 400th anniversary of Quebec City. The Canadian Army's universal full dress includes a scarlet tunic, and midnight blue trousers.

Units of the Canadian Army, Royal Canadian Air Force, and cadets of the Royal Military College of Canada also wear full-dress uniforms. The Army's universal full-dress uniforms includes a scarlet tunic, midnight blue trousers with a scarlet trouser stripe. However, many regiments in the Canadian Army maintain authorized regimental differences from the Army's universal full dress, most notably for its armoured units, Scottish regiments, and Voltigeur/Rifle regiments. The full-dress uniform for cadets at Royal Military College is similar to the Army's universal full dress uniform. Full dress uniforms for units of the Royal Canadian Air Force include a blue tunic, and blue trousers and facings. Naval full dress includes a navy blue tunic and trousers with white facings, although the Canadian Forces dress instructions state that naval full dress is no longer worn.

Authorized headdresses for the Canadian Armed Forces is the: beret, wedge cap, ballcap, Yukon cap, and tuque (toque). Each is coloured according to the distinctive uniform worn: navy (white or navy blue), army (rifle green or "regimental" colour), and air force (light blue). Adherents of the Sikh faith may wear uniform turbans (dastar) (or patka, when operational) and Muslim women may wear uniform tucked hijabs under their authorized headdress. Jews may wear yarmulke under their authorized headdress and when bareheaded. The beret is probably the most widely worn headgear and is worn with almost all orders of dress (with the exception of the more formal orders of Navy and Air Force dress), and the colour of which is determined by the wearer's environment, branch, or mission. Naval personnel, however, seldom wear berets, preferring either service caps or authorized ballcaps (shipboard operational dress), which only the Navy wear. Air Force personnel, particularly officers, prefer the wedge cap to any other form of headdress. There is no naval variant of the wedge cap. The Yukon cap and tuque are worn only with winter dress, although clearance and combat divers may wear tuques year-round as a watch cap. Soldiers in Highland, Scottish, and Irish regiments generally wear an alternative headdress, including the glengarry, balmoral, tam o'shanter, and caubeen instead of the beret. The officer cadets of both Royal Military Colleges wear gold-braided "pillbox" (cavalry) caps with their ceremonial dress and have a unique fur "Astrakhan" for winter wear. The CAF wears the CG634 helmet.

== Symbolism and honours ==
Badge of the CAF from 1968 to 2026

The Canadian Forces have derived many of their traditions and symbols from the Navy, Army, and Air Force of the United Kingdom, including those with royal elements. Contemporary icons and rituals, however, have evolved to include elements reflective of Canada and the Canadian monarchy. Members of the country's royal family maintain personal relationships with the forces' divisions and regiments.

The monarch is regarded as the fount of honour and the Canadian system of orders, decorations, and medals includes numerous specifically for the military, such as the Victoria Cross, Order of Military Merit, Cross of Valour, Star of Courage, and Medal of Bravery. The Victoria Cross is the highest honour in Canada. The British version was presented to 94 Canadians and two Newfoundlanders between its creation in 1856 and 1993, when the Canadian Victoria Cross was instituted. No Canadian has received either honour since 1945.

During the unification of the forces in the 1960s, a renaming of the branches took place, resulting in the loss of the royal designations for the Navy and Air Force. On 16 August 2011, the federal Cabinet announced that Air Command was re-assuming the Air Force's original name, Royal Canadian Air Force; Land Force Command the name Canadian Army; and Maritime Command the name Royal Canadian Navy. The government stated that the change was made to better reflect Canada's military heritage and align Canada with other Commonwealth realms whose militaries use the royal designation, while political opponents claimed the changes were more politically motivated and designed to appeal to monarchists in the Conservative party.

== Military families ==
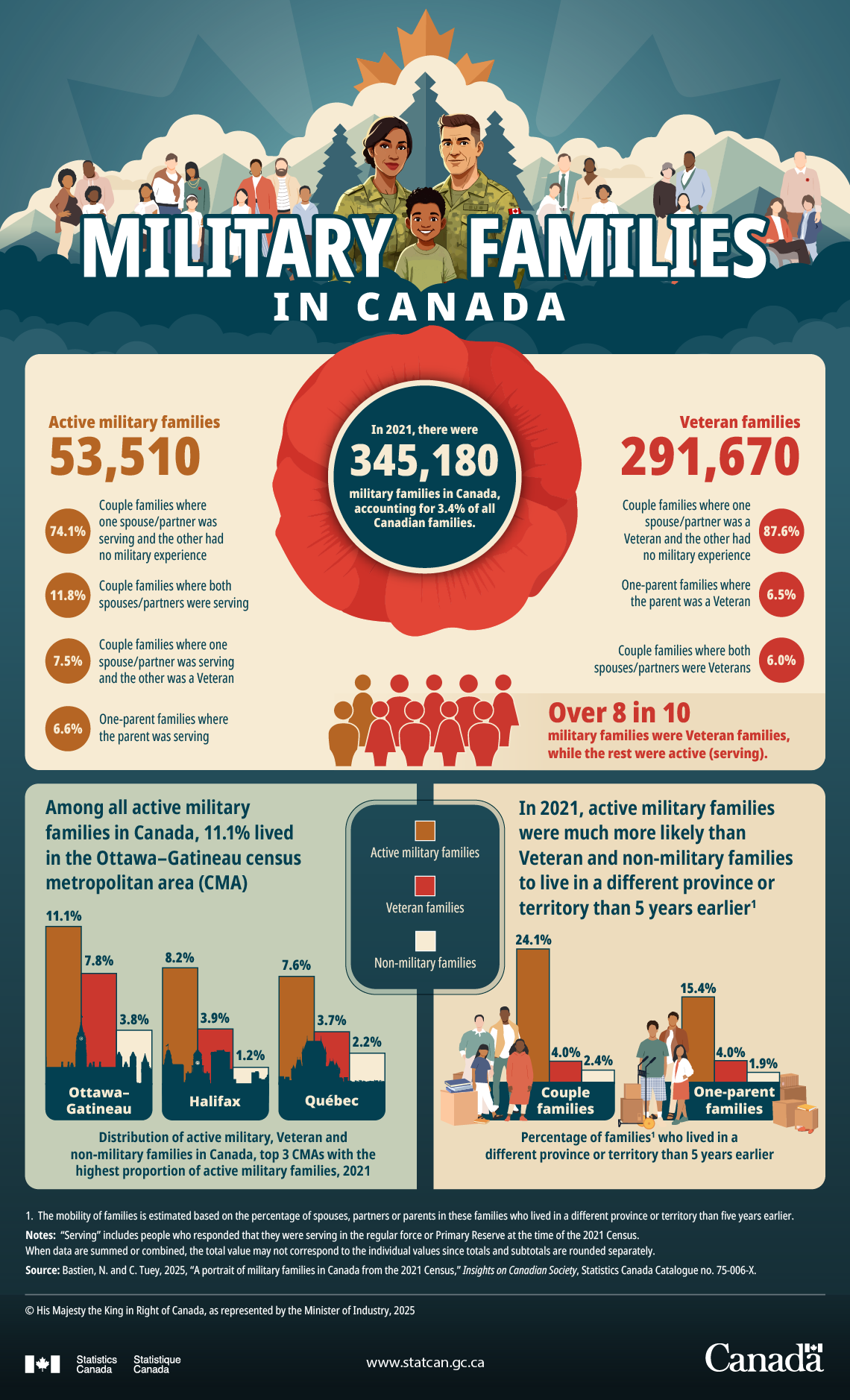

The portrait of military families in Canada from the 2021 Census had 345,180 military families, making up 3.4% of all families in the country. This group included 53,510 active military families. Among these, 74.1% were couple families with one partner serving and the other having no military experience, 11.8% had both partners serving, 7.5% had one partner serving and the other a Veteran, and 6.6% were one-parent families with a serving parent. The majority, 291,670, were Veteran families, mainly consisting of couple families where one spouse was a Veteran and the other had no military experience at 87.6%. Additionally, 6.5% were one-parent Veteran families and 6.0% had both partners as Veterans.

More than 80% of military families in Canada were identified as Veteran families, while the remaining percentage was active.The report also highlighted the distribution of active military, Veteran, and non-military families. In Ottawa–Gatineau, 11.1% were active military families, 7.8% were Veteran families, and 3.8% were non-military families. Similar proportions were observed in Halifax and Québec.

Active military families were more likely than Veteran and non-military families to have moved to a different province or territory in the past five years. The report detailed that 24.1% of couple families and 15.4% of one-parent families in the active category lived in a different province compared to 4.0% and 1.9%, respectively, for Veteran families, and 2.4% and 1.9% for non-military families.

== See also ==
- Authorized marches of the Canadian Armed Forces
- Canadian Armed Forces order of precedence
- Canadian Forces Military Police
- Canadian Forces Radio and Television
- Gender discrimination in the Canadian Military
- Canadian war cemeteries
- Canadian war memorials
- Code of Service Discipline
- List of Canadian military occupations
- List of historical equipment of the Canadian military
- List of military equipment of Canada
- Planned Canadian Forces projects
- Postal Branch
