= Public Safety Canada =

Government department

- Sécurité publique Canada

Department overview
- Formed: 2003
- Preceding Department: Department of the Solicitor General
- Type: Department responsible for: public safety and emergency management not assigned to another federal organization; national security; emergency preparedness
- Jurisdiction: Government of Canada
- Employees: 1,400 (2023–24, as indicated in Main Estimates)
- Annual budget: $2.6 billion CAD (2023–24 budget, as indicated in Main Estimates)
- Ministers responsible: Gary Anandasangaree, Minister of Public Safety; Eleanor Olszewski, Minister of Emergency Management and Community Resilience
- Deputy Minister responsible: Tricia Geddes, Deputy Minister; Jeffery Hutchinson, Associate Deputy Minister (Emergency Management)
- Child agencies: Royal Canadian Mounted Police; Canada Border Services Agency; Canadian Security Intelligence Service; Correctional Service of Canada; Parole Board of Canada
- Key documents: Department of Public Safety and Emergency Preparedness Act; Emergency Management Act
- Website: www.publicsafety.gc.ca

Public Safety Canada (PS; French: Sécurité publique Canada, SP) (Note: Public Safety Canada is the applied title under the Federal Identity Program; the legal title is the Department of Public Safety and Emergency Preparedness.) is the department of the Government of Canada responsible for (most) matters of public safety, emergency management, national security, and emergency preparedness in Canada.

The department is responsible to Parliament through the minister of public safety and emergency preparedness.

== History ==
Prior to 1988, the agency responsible for the "public safety" portfolio was known as Emergency Preparedness Canada, which was created under the auspices of the Department of National Defence. In 1988, the Department of Public Safety and Emergency Preparedness was established by the Emergency Preparedness Act.

With the purpose of creating a single entity with responsibility for ensuring public safety in Canada, the Department of Public Safety and Emergency Preparedness was created in December 2003 during a reorganization of the federal government. Created as a direct result of lessons learned from the September 11 attacks on the United States in 2001, the department is in many ways similar to the U.S. Department of Homeland Security; it does not cover the protection of maritime sovereignty (which is covered by the Canadian Forces, Transport Canada, and Fisheries and Oceans Canada), and it does not have general jurisdiction over immigration (it took over immigration enforcement functions most visibly at borders and ports of landing, but the separate department Immigration, Refugees and Citizenship Canada manages application and screening, settlement services, and naturalization).

PSEPC became legally established when the Department of Public Safety and Emergency Preparedness Act came into force on 4 April 2005.

== Governance and organization ==
Department of Public Safety and Emergency Preparedness Act

Parliament of Canada
- Citation: SC 2005, c 10
- Enacted: 2005
- Status: Current legislation

The legal authority of Public Safety Canada is enabled through the Emergency Management Act (2007) and the Department of Public Safety and Emergency Preparedness Act, S.C. 2005, c. 10, which came into force on 4 April 2005 during the Martin government. The department became legally established when this Act was given Royal Assent.

PS has 12 regional offices, which are located across the country and are organized into 5 regions:

- Atlantic — St-John's, NL (The John Cabot Building); Charlottetown, PE (National Bank Tower); Dartmouth, NS (Eric Spicer Building); and Fredericton, NB
- Quebec and Nunavut — Montreal, QC (Square-Victoria Street)
- Ontario — Toronto, ON (Bloor Street)
- Prairies and Northwest Territories — Winnipeg, MB (Broadway); Regina, SK (GOCB Regina); Edmonton, AB (Baker Centre Building); and Yellowknife, NT (Greenstone Building)
- British Columbia and Yukon — Burnaby, BC (Production Way); and Saanichton, BC.

=== Spending ===
Together, the agencies of Public Safety Canada have an annual budget of more than CA$9 billion and over 66,000 employees working across the country.

PSC's planned spending for the 2023-24 fiscal year is $2.6 billion; this can be broken down by core responsibility:

- National security: $30.1 million,
- Community safety: $731 million,
- Emergency management: $1.81 billion,
- Internal services: $68.7 million.

== Public Safety portfolio ==
Most of the department comprises organizations that were previously placed under the Department of Solicitor General of Canada, however the reorganization of several federal departments and ministries added the Canada Border Services Agency to the portfolio, after the two streams of the former Canada Customs and Revenue Agency were split in 2003. In addition, the Office of Critical Infrastructure Protection and Emergency Preparedness (OCIPEP) from the Department of National Defence was also brought into the department.

In addition to the department, there are five agencies and three review bodies within the Public Safety portfolio headed by the Minister of Public Safety.

=== Organizations ===
- Agencies:
  - Canada Border Services Agency
  - Canadian Security Intelligence Service
    - Integrated Terrorism Assessment Centre
  - Correctional Service of Canada
  - Parole Board of Canada
  - Royal Canadian Mounted Police
    - Canadian Firearms Program
    - Canadian Police College
    - Canadian Police Information Centre
    - Criminal Intelligence Service Canada
    - Integrated National Security Enforcement Teams
    - Parliamentary Protective Service (through an agreement with the speakers of the House of Commons and Senate)
- Review bodies:
  - Civilian Review and Complaints Commission for the RCMP
  - Office of the Correctional Investigator
  - RCMP External Review Committee
- Other units:
  - Canadian Cyber Incident Response Centre
  - National Search and Rescue Secretariat

=== Core responsibilities ===
The core responsibilities of Public Safety Canada include:

- National security — developing policy, legislation, and programs to support Canada’s capacity to respond to, and counter, national security threats directed against Canadians, Canada's critical infrastructure, and Canada's cyber systems.
  - PSC administers the Passenger Protect Program (PPP) — an aviation security program akin to the "No Fly List," which prevents those deemed as risks from boarding an aircraft or subjects them to additional screening measures.
  - PSC plans to launch the Financial Crime Coordination Centre (FC3; formerly known as the Anti-Money Laundering Action, Coordination and Enforcement Team, or ACE) — a centre whose operations are intended to focus on "coordinating support for anti-money laundering and anti-terrorist financing operational partners."
- Community safety — providing national coordination to "help Canadian communities and stakeholders respond to crime and build community resilience, promote the safety and security of Canadian communities and institutions, enhance the integrity of Canada’s borders, and support the provision of policing services to Indigenous communities." In short, community safety includes crime prevention, law enforcement and policing, serious and organized crime, border policy, corrections, and Indigenous policing. Public Safety Canada:
  - provides funding to the Canadian Centre for Child Protection — a charitable organization that operates Cybertip.ca, a tip-line for reporting the online sexual exploitation of children.
  - provides funding to the Canadian Centre to End Human Trafficking — an organization that operates a multilingual, 24/7 toll-free Canadian Human Trafficking Hotline.
  - supports the coming-into-force of the remaining provisions under former Bill C-71, An Act to amend certain Acts and Regulations in relation to firearms.
  - delivers the First Nations and Inuit Policing Program — a programme supporting police services in First Nations and Inuit communities.
- Emergency management — strengthening an all-hazards approach to national emergency management in order to 'help prevent, mitigate, prepare for, respond to and recover from emergency events. Public Safety Canada:
  - works to advance a Public Safety Broadband Network (PSBN) — a secure high-speed wireless data communications network that can be used by emergency responders and public safety personnel to communicate with each other in emergency situations and during day-to-day operations. In 2017-2018, the Canadian government introduced a Federal PSBN Task Team to consult provincial/territorial and municipal governments, first responders, the private sector, and others on implementation models for a PSBN in Canada.
  - helps to support the National Public Alerting System (NPAS; brand name: Alert Ready) — a system that provides emergency management organizations across Canada with the ability to quickly warn the public of imminent or unfolding hazards to life.
  - support the long-term policy of its program for Heavy Urban Search and Rescue (HUSAR) — a specialized form of urban search and rescue.
  - leads Canada's engagement with the International COSPAS-SARSAT Programme Agreement — a satellite-based search-and-rescue system.
  - supports and reviews the Disaster Financial Assistance Arrangements (DFAA) — a federal government program that provides financial assistance to provincial/territorial governments following large-scale natural disasters.

== Other operations and initiatives ==
=== Canada Centre for Community Engagement and Prevention of Violence ===
The Canada Centre for Community Engagement and Prevention of Violence (Canada Centre) leads the Canadian government's efforts to "counter radicalization to violence." Rather than managing or advising on individual cases, it addresses the issue in terms of broad strategy. It is located at Public Safety Canada headquarters in Ottawa.

The Minister of Public Safety was given the mandate over the Centre in 2015; the federal budget the following year allocated $35 million over five years to establish and support the Centre, in addition to $10 million per year on-going. The Centre was officially launched in 2017.

In terms of international efforts, the Canada Centre closely collaborates with partners in the Five Eyes (United States, United Kingdom, Australia, New Zealand), the Group of Seven (G7), and the European Union. The Centre also actively participates in multilateral forums such as the United Nations and the Global Counterterrorism Forum (GCTF), as well as collaborating with the Institute for Strategic Dialogue, the Hedayah Center, and the Centre for Research and Evidence on Security Threats (CREST).

The Centre administers the Community Resilience Fund (CRF), a system for supporting "partnerships in countering radicalization to violence in Canada," providing funding to organizations towards engagement (e.g., research, cooperation, engaging communities, etc.) with the issue.

As of 2019‑2020 onward, the Fund has been promised $7 million available each year for existing and new projects. Through the Fund, the Canada Centre has supported the Centre for the Prevention of Radicalization Leading to Violence, located in Montréal, in conducting research on "better understanding risk and protective factors within families of individuals who radicalize to violence and also the role families and communities can play in mitigating radicalization to violence."

==== National Strategy on Countering Radicalization to Violence ====
On 11 December 2018, the Canada Centre launched the "National Strategy on Countering Radicalization to Violence," which "explains radicalization to violence and the destructive and harmful behaviours involved, and outlines the Government of Canada's approach and key priorities in countering and preventing radicalization to violence."

The National Expert Committee on Countering Radicalization to Violence ensures that the Canada Centre's efforts to implement the recently launched National Strategy on Countering Radicalization to Violence will help meet the Strategy's three priorities: building, sharing and using knowledge; addressing radicalization to violence in the online space; and supporting interventions. Its members includes:

- Nina Krieger — Executive Director at the Vancouver Holocaust Education Centre.
- Jaspreet Khangura — Emergency physician (FRCPC) at the Royal Alexandra Hospital and Northeast Community Health Centre in Edmonton, Alberta.
- Rizwan Mohammad — a civic engagement coordinator
- Irfan Chaudhry — a hate crimes researcher and the Director of the Office of Human Rights, Diversity and Equity at MacEwan University.
- Shelly Whitman — Executive Director of the Roméo Dallaire Child Soldiers Initiative

=== Canadian Disaster Database ===
The Canadian Disaster Database (CDD) publicly-accessible web-based repository that tracks significant disaster events, describing (1) where and when a disaster occurred; (2) the number of injuries, evacuations, and fatalities; and (3) an estimate of the costs. It contains detailed historical information on over 1,000 natural and human-made disasters (such as technological and conflict events, excluding war) that have taken place since 1900 in Canada or abroad and that have directly affected Canadians.

The events that are tracked conform to the "Emergency Management Framework for Canada's" definition of a disaster and meet one or more of the following criteria:

- 10 or more people killed;
- 100 or more people affected/injured/infected/evacuated or homeless;
- an appeal for national/international assistance;
- historical significance; and/or
- significant damage/interruption of normal processes such that the community affected cannot recover on its own.

=== Get Prepared ===
The "72 Hours...Is Your Family Prepared?" campaign (or the 72 Hours campaign) is a social-marketing program on emergency preparedness meant to motivate Canadians to (1) "know the risks in their community;" (2) "make an emergency plan;" and, (3) "get an emergency kit." The idea is to ensure that Canadians are prepared to survive on their own for at least the first 72 hours of an emergency, if there ever were one.

The campaign was launched in 2006 by Public Safety Canada in collaboration with the Canadian Red Cross, St. John Ambulance, and The Salvation Army.

The campaign includes various publications and promotional materials, and a dedicated website called GetPrepared.ca, among other things. Also as part of this campaign, Public Safety Canada coordinates a yearly national event called Emergency Preparedness Week (EP Week), which takes place during the first full week of May and supports emergency preparedness-related activities at the local level.

=== Canada-United States Cross-Border Crime Forum ===
The Canada-United States Cross-Border Crime Forum (CBCF) is a joint Ministerial forum that brings together senior law enforcement and justice officials from several organizations in Canada and the United States.

Hosted by Public Safety Canada, Justice Canada, the U.S. Department of Justice, and the U.S. Department of Homeland Security, the CBCF addresses issues of transnational crime, such as organized crime, counter-terrorism, smuggling, economic crime. CBCF was formed in 1997 with an operational focus, originally addressing smuggling across the eastern regions of both countries.

The main Canadian participants include:

- Public Safety Canada
- Department of Justice Canada
- Royal Canadian Mounted Police
- Canada Border Services Agency
- Global Affairs Canada
- Public Prosecution Service of Canada

The main American participants include:

- Department of Justice
- Department of Homeland Security
- U.S. Attorneys
- Federal Bureau of Investigation
- Bureau of Alcohol, Tobacco, Firearms and Explosives
- Drug Enforcement Administration
- U.S. Immigration and Customs Enforcement
- U.S. Customs and Border Protection
- U.S. Coast Guard
- U.S. Department of State

== See also ==
- Interagency Volcanic Event Notification Plan
- List of emergency management agencies in Canada
  - Emergency Management BC
  - Emergency Management Ontario
  - Ministère de la sécurité publique (Quebec)
  - Nova Scotia Guard
- Canadian Air Carrier Protection Program
- Ministry of Community Safety and Correctional Services (Ontario)
- Toronto Office of Emergency Management
- Minister of Justice (Canada)
- Public safety
- Federal Emergency Management Agency (FEMA) - United States
