= Fire Station No. 3 =

Fire Station No. 3, and variations such as Engine House No. 3, may refer to:

in Australia

- Carlton Fire Station, Carlton, Victoria, also known as "Fire Station No. 3", Victorian Heritage-listed

in Canada

- Former Fire Hall No. 3, Saskatoon, Saskatchewan

in the United States

(ordered by state then city)

- Fire Station No. 3 (Birmingham, Alabama)
- Fayetteville Fire Department Fire Station 3, Fayetteville, Arkansas
- Firehouse No. 3 (Sacramento, California), known also as "Engine Co. #3 Firehouse"
- Fire Station No. 3 (Denver, Colorado), a Denver Landmark
- Engine House No. 3 (Fort Wayne, Indiana)
- Fire House No. 3, South Bend, Indiana
- Engine House No. 3 (Kalamazoo, Michigan)
- Engine House No. 3, Truck No. 2, Hoboken, New Jersey
- Engine House No. 3 (Sandusky, Ohio)
- Fire Station No. 3 (Arlington, Virginia), also known as Cherrydale Volunteer Fire House
- Spokane Fire Station No. 3, Spokane, Washington

== See also ==
- List of fire stations
- Cleveland Mine Engine House Number 3, a historic building housing an engine in Ishpeming, Michigan
