= Canadian Centre for Child Protection =

Canadian charitable organization

- Formation: April 1985; 41 years ago
- Founder: Wilma Derksen
- Headquarters: 615 Academy Road, Winnipeg, Manitoba
- Services: Cybertip.ca; MissingKids.ca; Kids in the Know; Commit to Kids
- Chair: Kathie King
- Patron: Janice Filmon, Lieutenant governor of Manitoba
- Website: www.protectchildren.ca
- Formerly called: Child Find Manitoba (until 2006)

Canadian Centre for Child Protection (C3P; French: Centre canadien de protection de l'enfance) is a Canadian registered charitable organization dedicated to the personal safety of all children. More specifically, its goal is to reduce the victimization (sexual abuse and exploitation) of children by providing programs and services to the Canadian public.

The organization is supported by the Government of Canada, along with the provincial/territorial governments of Manitoba, New Brunswick, and the Yukon.

C3P offers various prevention and intervention services to the Canadian public; one of its core services is Cybertip.ca, Canada's official tip-line for reporting the online sexual exploitation of children.

== History ==
In April 1985, the Canadian Centre for Child Protection was founded as Child Find Manitoba by Wilma Derksen, the mother of 13-year-old Candace Derksen, who was abducted and murdered on 30 November 1984.

On 26 September 2002, the Cybertip.ca began operation as a two-year pilot project. In May 2004, it was recognized as a national hotline by the Canadian Government, and was officially launched in January 2005.

Also in 2004, C3P launched Kids in the Know, a national, interactive safety education program.

In May 2006, the organization was renamed the Canadian Centre for Child Protection. In May 2011, C3P launched MissingKids.ca.

== Projects ==
=== Cybertip.ca ===
Cybertip.ca
- Founded: 26 September 2002
- Owner: Canadian Centre for Child Protection
- Website: www.cybertip.ca/
- Commercial: no
- Launched: January 2005

Cybertip.ca (French: Cyberaide.ca) is Canada's official tip-line for reporting the online sexual exploitation of children. It is owned and operated by the Canadian Centre for Child Protection, in partnership with local law enforcement agencies and the Royal Canadian Mounted Police, whose National Child Exploitation Coordination Centre coordinates and supports national investigations into child sexual exploitation.

Initiated on 26 September 2002 as a two-year pilot project, the Government of Canada recognized and announced Cybertip.ca in May 2004 as the national tip-line for the Canadian public reporting of online child sexual exploitation. The site had its full launch in January 2005, and has since received over 40,000 suspected cases from the Canadian public.

Cybertip.ca accepts and addresses online and telephone reports from the public regarding child pornography (child abuse images and material), online luring, children exploited through prostitution, travelling to sexually exploited children, and child trafficking. Staff examine reports from the public and forward those that are deemed potentially illegal to law enforcement in the appropriate jurisdiction. Although the majority of Cybertip.ca's reports are provided online, the public is also able to contact the tipline by phone.

As the central clearinghouse for online child exploitation, Cybertip.ca maintains a regularly updated list of specific foreign-hosted Internet addresses (URLs) associated with images of child sexual abuse, and provide that list in a secure manner to participating internet service providers (ISPs).

Launched in January 2007, Project Cleanfeed Canada is designed to reduce accidental access to child sexual abuse images, as well as create a disincentive for those trying to access or distribute child pornography. Participating ISPs include Bell Canada, Telus, Shaw, Rogers Communications, Vidéotron, Bell Aliant, and SaskTel.

==== Reports ====
As of 2021, over 10,000 reports are processed by Cybertip.ca each month.

Reports to Cybertip.ca are submitted by the public under one of eight reporting categories:

- Agreement or arrangement with another person to commit a sexual offence against a child — 0.40%
- Child pornography (Child sexual abuse material) (Note: "Child sexual abuse material" is the terminology used by the Centre rather than "child pornography." They argue that it "more clearly describes the assaults taking place against children" and "more accurately describes the images and videos depicting this form of abuse." (Social Value Report, 2018-2019, p. 3)) — 95.95%
- Child prostitution — 0.38%
- Child sex-tourism — 0.22%
- Child trafficking — 0.14%
- Luring — 1.98%
- Making sexually explicit material available to a child — 0.31%
- Non-consensual distribution of intimate images — 0.64%

In 2018–2019, Cybertip.ca processed 1,474,075 reports, marking a 945% increase from 2017 to 2018. Of the reports processed, 98% were attributed to Project Arachnid; Of the child sexual exploitation reports processed, 99% were forwarded to law enforcement agencies, child welfare agencies, and/or INHOPE member hotlines, or a notice was sent to an electronic service provider; nearly 1.2 million notices were issued to electronic service providers in relation to child sexual abuse material detected on their service.

=== Kids in the Know ===
Kids in the Know (KIK) is a national, interactive safety education program, helping to increase students' personal safety and reduce their risk of victimization, both online and offline. Launched in 2004, Kids in the Know was created to help children from kindergarten to high school using the unique information taken into account from the operation of Cybertip.ca. The program meets the curricula outcomes mandated by ministries of education in all jurisdictions across Canada.

=== MissingKids.ca ===
MissingKids.ca is Canada’s missing children resource centre, offering families support in finding their missing child, as well as providing educational material to help prevent children from going missing.

MissingKids.ca works in collaboration with Réseau Enfants-Retour to provide missing children services to Quebec residents. In turn, Réseau Enfants-Retour helps MissingKids.ca in offering case management support to Francophone families.

MissingKidsALERT is MissingKids.ca's notification system providing information to the public in the search for missing children. The service is targeted and precise, notifying those who have signed up in the event of a missing child in their region. The service can also complement the existing AMBER Alert systems in Canada, as well as being used in cases that fall outside of the protocol of AMBER Alert.

=== Project Arachnid ===
Project Arachnid is an automated crawler developed by the Canadian Centre for Child Protection to detect images and videos on the internet and the dark web based on confirmed digital fingerprints of illegal child sexual abuse content.

As of 1 July 2026, since its launch in 2017, Project Arachnid has processed more than 176 billion images; over 126 million images have been triggered for analyst review; over 141 million notices have been sent to internet service providers to remove child sexual abuse material; and 85% of the notices issued relate to victims who are not known to have been identified by police.

Aiming to work in collaboration on a global scale to reduce the availability of child sexual abuse material, the initiative is supported, in part, by the Secretary of State for the Home Department in the United Kingdom. Hotlines and organizations around the world have worked with the Centre on Project Arachnid, including:

- Australian Government eSafety Commissioner
- Centar za nestalu I zlostavljanu djecu (Centre for Missing and Exploited Children Croatia)
- Child Focus Belgium
- ECPAT Sweden
- Innocence in Danger Germany
- Jugendschutz.net
- Lastekaitse Liit — Estonian Union for Child Welfare
- National Association for People Abused in Childhood
- National Center for Missing & Exploited Children (US)
- National Society for the Prevention of Cruelty to Children
- Pelastakaa Lapset (Save the Children Finland)
- Red Papaz (Columbia)
- Suojellaan Lapsia (Protect Children)

== Partners ==
The Canadian Centre for Child Protection has partnered with various organizations in the public and private sectors.

The Centre has been supported by the Government of Canada since May 2004, particularly by Public Safety Canada under the "National Strategy for the Protection of Children from Sexual Exploitation". The Centre is also supported by the Government of Manitoba and is a designated agency in the province to receive reports under Manitoba's Child and Family Services Act, as well as to provide supports and information pursuant to the provincial Intimate Image Protection Act.

The Centre has also prioritized the establishment of formalized protocols with law enforcement agencies across Canada. As of 2021, the Centre has signed formalized agreements with 26 law enforcement services around Canada.

In regards to education and prevention programs, resources, and training, the Centre has formal memorandums of understanding/protocols in place with the Government of Manitoba, Coaching Association of Canada, Scouts Canada, Calgary & Area Child Advocacy Centre, and the Canadian Armed Forces/Canadian Cadet Organizations. C3P also provides resources and training to such child-serving organizations as Gymnastics Canada, viaSport British Columbia, the City of Winnipeg, and Canada Soccer.

In the non-governmental sector, the Centre has partnered with and/or has been supported by: Bell, Telus, Shaw Communications, Bell MTS, Lifetouch, Canadian Wireless Telecommunications Association, Rogers, No Fixed Address, SaskTel, Old Navy, Circle K, Disney, and Magnet Forensics.

For Project Arachnid, the Centre works with hotlines and government organizations from around the world, including: National Center for Missing & Exploited Children, ECPAT Sweden, Red Papaz Centar za nestalu I zlostavljanu djecu (Centre for Missing and Exploited Children Croatia), Australian Government eSafety Commissioner, Suojellaan Lapsia (Protect Children), Pelastakaa Lapset (Save the Children Finland), Jugendschutz.net, Child Focus Belgium, Lastekaitse Liit — Estonian Union for Child Welfare, National Society for the Prevention of Cruelty to Children, National Association for People Abused in Childhood, and Innocence in Danger Germany.

== See also ==
- Human trafficking in Canada
