= Saskatoon Fire Department =

Fire department of Saskatoon, SK, Canada

- Badge of the SFD

- Patch (i.e. shoulder flash) of the SFD

Operational area
- Country: Canada
- Province: Saskatchewan
- City: Saskatoon
- Address: 125 Idylwyld Drive South Saskatoon, SK S7M 1L4
- Coordinates: 52°07′41″N 106°40′14″W

Agency overview
- Established: 1880s; 145 years ago (Volunteer); -May 1, 1909; 117 years ago (Professionalization) -May 29, 1918; 108 years ago (Unionization)
- Annual calls: 25,366 (2024)
- Employees: 360
- Fire chief: Doug Wegren
- Motto: Proud to serve Saskatoon

Facilities and equipment
- Stations: 9
- Engines: 12
- Ladders: 2
- Rescues: 1
- Tenders: 2
- Wildland: 2
- Fireboats: 3 (2 rigid hull, 1 inflatable)

Website
- Saskatoon Fire Department

The Saskatoon Fire Department (SFD) provides fire services for the city of Saskatoon, Saskatchewan, Canada.

The department has its origins in the 1880s, when it made use of outdated equipment, horse drawn fire apparatuses and volunteer firefighters. In 1918, the SFD became a professional fire fighting force, and for the first time, firefighters in the city formed a union. In the same year, the SFD purchased its first piece of motorized equipment.

As of October 2024, the department has nine stations. The department employs over 360 staff members. Their headquarters is located at Fire Hall No 1., 125 Idylwyld Drive.

== History ==
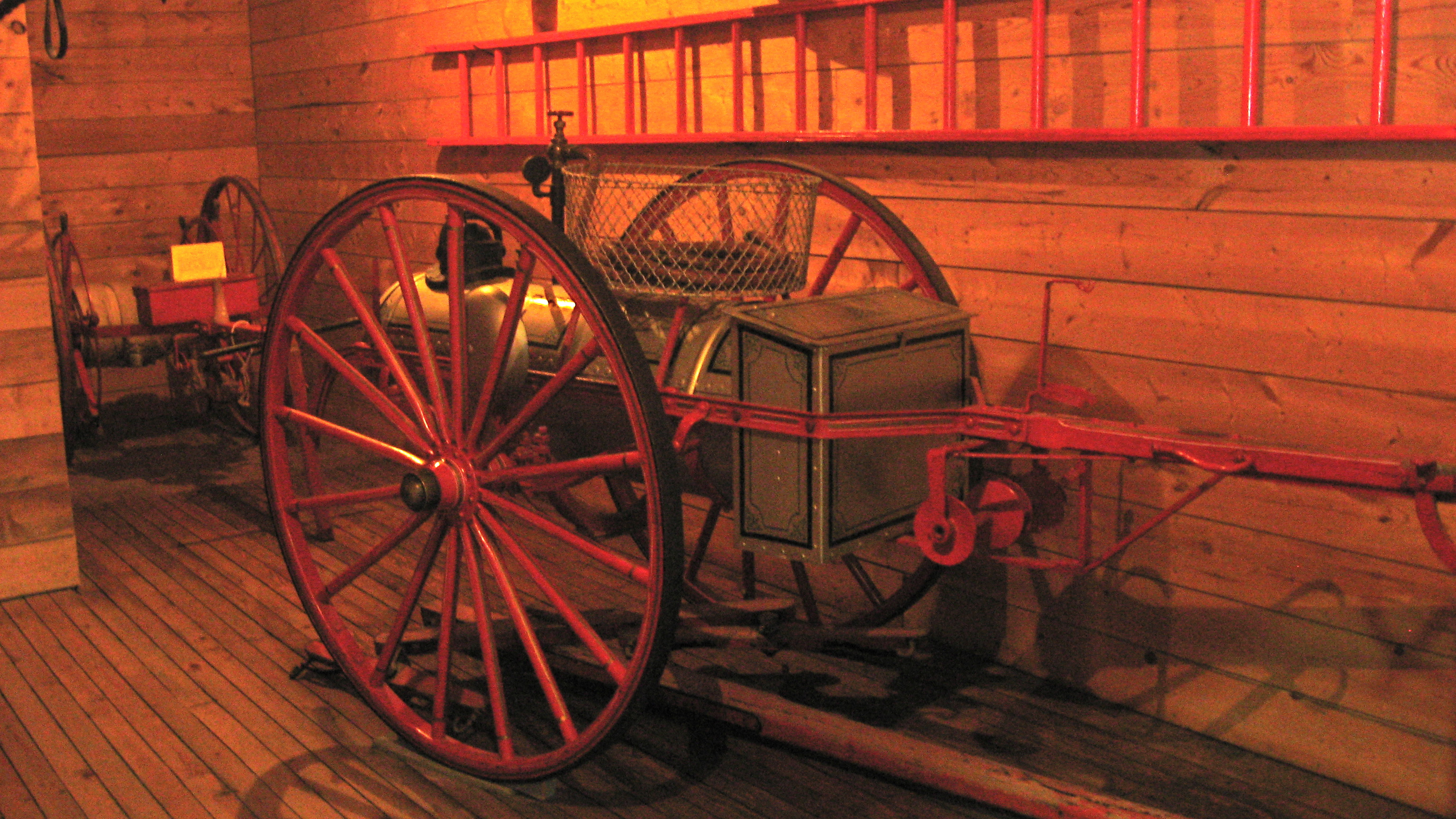
An 1890s fire apparatus, photographed at the Western Development Museum

The SFD was first formed as an ad hoc volunteer department in the 1880s, relying on horse drawn equipment, water reservoirs and buckets.

In the years leading up to 1911, Saskatoon, experienced an explosive period of growth, swelling its population from less than 300 inhabitants ten years prior to over 20,000, earning it a reputation as one of Canada's fastest-growing cities. Initially, the city paid little attention to fire prevention, relying on ancient fire apparatuses, including gasoline-powered fire engines drawn by yokes of oxen, until 1903. However, people soon recognized that this rapid development their city required a modernization of its firefighting capabilities.

The job of carrying out the SFD's modernisation fell to Thomas E. Heath, a dedicated firefighter who arrived from the Hamilton Fire Department around late 1909, to assume charge of the SFD. Shortly after establishing himself in the city, Heath came to reside in the Landa Residence in the Riversdale neighbourhood. The residence has been listed as a municipal heritage property since 2005.

Heath, who had served in Hamilton since 1888, successfully impressed upon city officials the need for investment, noting that the city's building permits were currently amounting to almost $1,000,000, creating a significant need for the department to keep pace in order to ensure the safety of new development. A radical improvement had been made, notably the acquisition of a new motorized combined chemical and hose wagon, built by the W. E. Seagrave Company. Chief Heath proudly stated that this motorized wagon consistently reached fires far earlier than the horse-drawn apparatus in on all the occasions it was deployed and the department was so satisfied that a second motorized wagon was quickly ordered.

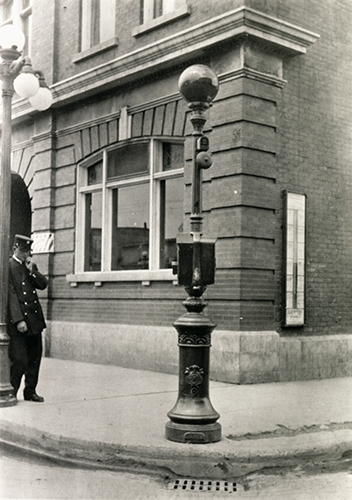
Gamewell alarm box at King Edward Hotel on the corner of Avenue A and 20th Street. Installed in 1913, this box was the 51st.

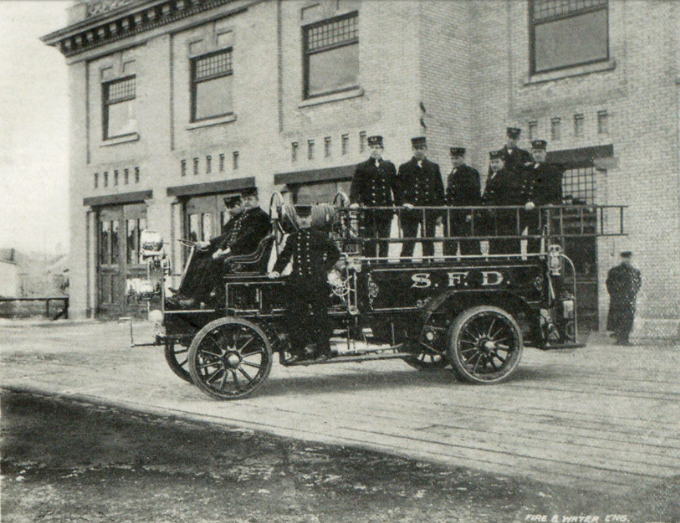
An early motorized hose wagon of the SFD, c. 1911. Hoses can be seen spooled behind the drivers.

The SFD quickly scaled up its services to match the city's rapid expansion. Upon Chief Heath's arrival, the force consisted of 13 permanent men; by 1911, the force numbered 25 full-paid men, operating out of three fire stations. The original equipment—which included a 500-gallon Waterous fire engine and a Seagrave service truck—had been augmented by a Gamewell fire alarm system with 25 outdoor call boxes located around the city, in addition to the motorized and horse-drawn combination wagons.

Furthermore, the city was planning to spend $50,000 to build and equip two more fire stations. The city’s growing skyline, which now included tall structures following the practice of much larger municipalities, necessitated the recent order of an 85-foot Seagrave aerial fire truck. Saskatoon’s waterworks system, utilizing direct pumping and a standpipe, provided a first-class service with a capacity of about 6,000,000 gallons per day and a standing pressure of 70 psi that could be increased, if necessary, to 125 psi for the purposes of fire suppression. Additionally, the SFD was equipped with Eastman Siemens deluge gun which could be deployed if additional support was required. Despite the prevalence of wood frame construction and the rise in automobiles and garages, which meant more gasoline was in use in the city, the department's efficiency was high: in the previous year, they answered 100 alarms with an combined loss of less than $80,000.

By the 1930s, the SFD, like most cities, had largely replaced their draught animals with motorized engines. Departments began to sell off or give their horses and oxen, where they found new jobs delivering milk or mail or pulling bread carts. Some of the horses had become highly accustomed to their service in the SFD, and there are some anecdotes of retired fire horses springing into action at the sound of a fire bell, taking off down the street without their driver, and their carts bouncing behind them.

In 1959, the SFD abandoned its station at former Fire Hall No. 3 in the Nutana neighbourhood on 11th Street East for a new, larger station of the same number on York Avenue and Taylor Street. The old station had been built to meet the increased need for fire protection following the construction of the University of Saskatchewan on the east side of the river. When it was constructed, Fire Hall No. 3 was a very modern facility, and included automatic overhead doors, a fireman's pole, overhead harness storage, loading pulleys, as well as apparatuses both drawn by horses and powered by gasoline. When the SFD left the building, it became home to the Saskatoon office of Canada's civil defence agency, the Emergency Measures Organization in 1959. The former station's basement was converted into a radiation-proof bunker, and the building was furnished with emergency supplies should war have broken out.

On 31 May 31, 1980 a major fire broke out in the five storey Beaux-Arts style Queen's Hotel, likely in the sauna. Forty-six firefighters arrived to battle the blaze; two of them, Victor Budz and Dennis Guenter, were killed in action. In response to the tragedy, the SFD upgraded its breathing equipment and increased its inspections of saunas. In honour of the two fallen firefighters, a memorial was constructed outside of Fire Hall No. 6, depicting Budz and Guenter in action, in 1990, in recognition of the tenth anniversary of the tragedy.

== Structure ==
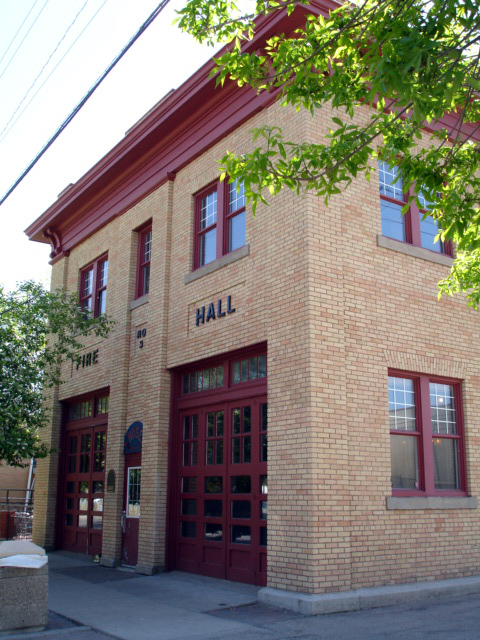
Former Fire Hall No. 3

Executive Officers are the senior members of the SFD who are responsible for leading the department. Executive officers are responsible for commanding supportive divisions as well as fire suppression operations and other services.

- Fire Chief – The chief oversees the entire SFD and all of its operations.
- Deputy Chief – Heads the Operations & Emergency Communications division, which is directly responsible for fire fighting.
- Assistant Chief – Head other divisions of the SFD including:
  - Emergency Management Organization
  - Staff Development & Safety
  - Community Relationships
  - Community Risk Reduction
  - Logistics
  - Fire marshal and fire prevention
- Battalion Chief – Captains, lieutenants, and firefighters work on a four battalion system (1, 2, 3, & 4), with approximately 70 staff on a battalion at a time. Each battalion is overseen by a Battalion Chief.
- Fire Marshal – Fire marshals are responsible for leading fire inspectors in their efforts to ensure that Saskatoon's homes, businesses and public areas meet the standards of the National Fire Code. The fire marshal's office is also responsible investigating the cause and circumstances of suspecious fires. Fire inspectors are also empowered to conduct inspections of "nuisance" properties, and issue tickes if necessary.

=== Rank insignia ===
Chief	Deputy chief	Assistant chief	Battalion chief	Fire marshal	Fire captain	Fire lieutenant	Fire inspector	Firefighter
Collar pin	Collar pin	Collar pin	Collar pin	Collar pin	Collar pin	Collar pin	Collar pin	No collar pin
Slip-on	Slip-on	Slip-on	Slip-on	Slip-on	Slip-on	Slip-on	Slip-on	No slip-on

== Special Programs ==
=== EMS ===
The SFD employs Emergency Medical Services teams of paramedics and medical first responders. In addition to their medical training, members of the EMS teams are also trained in additional special programs so that the SFD is able to deliver medical attention in a variety of scenarios.

=== Hazardous Materials ===
Each member of the SFD receives minimal training in identifying, handling and disposing of hazardous materials. Certain SFD members are certified as HazMat specialists, which provides them with more advanced hazardous materials training and equipment, allowing the SFD to maintain a dedicated Hazardous Materials Response Team made up of 43 specialists.

=== Surface Water Rescue ===
The SFD employs 49 surface water rescue specialists to resolve emergency situations on the South Saskatchewan River, and other nearby ponds, lakes, and rivers. Along with the SFD's three watercraft, the Surface Water Rescue Team utilize underwater sonar that is "sensitive enough to locate items as small as a pair of sunglasses".

=== Rescue Divers ===
Specialists in the surface water rescue program have the option to volunteer in the rescue diver program. These members choose to take on additional hours of training as public safety divers. These divers are trained to respond to any situation that requires the use of SCUBA equipment. As of 2024, the diver program had 15 members.

=== Technical Rescue ===
In order to respond to emergencies that require unique technical expertise, the SFD Technical Rescue Team is made up of 39 specialists, each of whom has training in one of five main technical rescue areas; rope rescue, confined space rescue, trench rescue, urban search and rescue, and vehicle extrication.

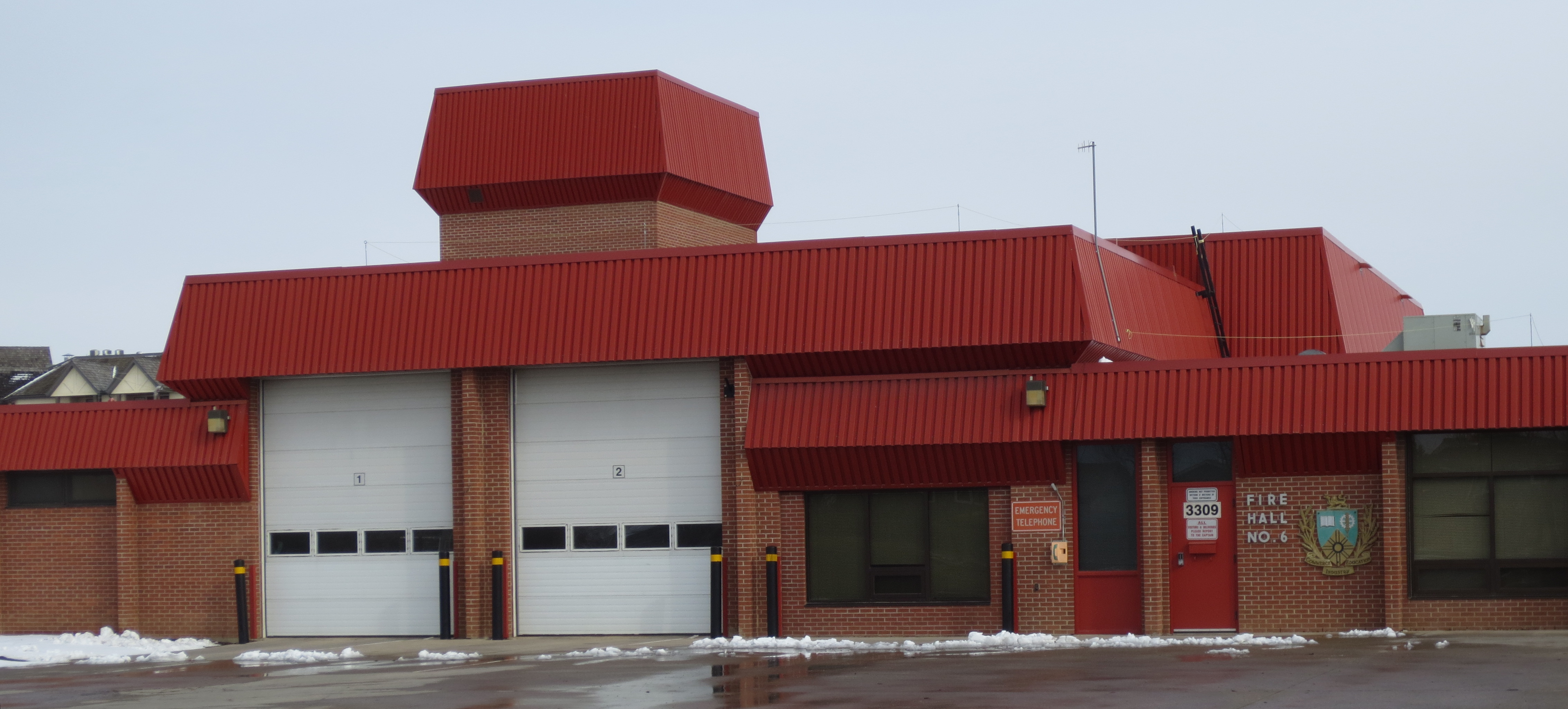
Fire Hall No. 6 on Taylor Street

== Equipment ==
The SFD maintains 12 front-line fire engines intended for fire suppression and assisting EMS units. The department also uses two aerial ladder trucks which are used to provide firefighters with the ability to reach tall structure fires and to deliver water at a higher altitude than they are able to on the ground.

When emergencies require specialized equipment, the SFD uses its heavy rescue unit, which carries equipment and supplies needed to conduct technical or complex rescues.

When fighting a fire, the SFD does not always have access to a fire hydrant. As such, the department maintains two tankers which are used to carry water to areas that lack fire hydrants.

The SFD has two rigid-hull boats and one inflatable boat which enable the Surface Water Rescue and Dive Teams to reach patents and emergencies on the water.

In addition to their engines, the SFD maintains two dedicated brush fire units for combating difficult-to-reach brush fires.

The SFD has an equipment sharing agreement with the Saskatoon Police Service and other city departments to share use of a mobile command unit, named Command 9.
