= Vehicle registration plates of Nova Scotia =

Nova Scotia
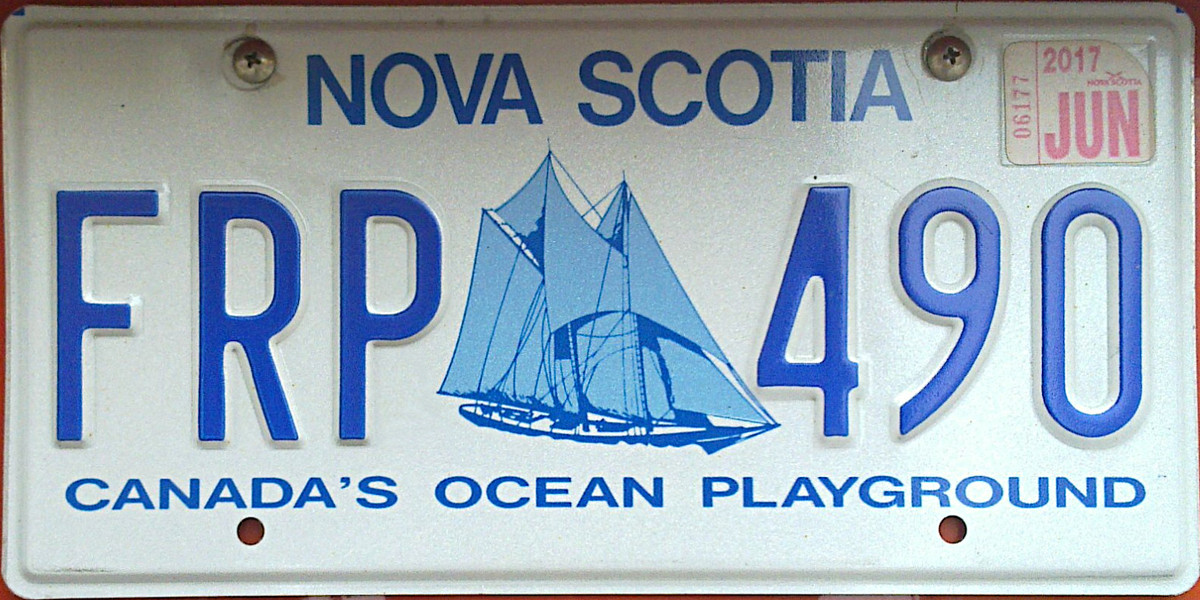

Current series
- Slogan: Canada's Ocean Playground
- Size: 12 in × 6 in 30 cm × 15 cm
- Material: Aluminum
- Serial format: ABC 123
- Introduced: 2011

Availability
- Issued by: Nova Scotia Registry of Motor Vehicles
- Manufactured by: Waldale Manufacturing Limited, Amherst, Nova Scotia

History
- First issued: January 1, 1918 (pre-provincial plates from 1907 through December 31, 1917)

The Canadian province of Nova Scotia first required its residents to register their motor vehicles in 1907. Registrants provided their own licence plates for display until 1918, when the province began to issue plates.

As of 2026, plates are issued by the Nova Scotia Registry of Motor Vehicles. Only rear plates have been required since 1997.

== Passenger baseplates ==
=== 1918 to 1959 ===
In 1956, Canada, the United States, and Mexico came to an agreement with the American Association of Motor Vehicle Administrators, the Automobile Manufacturers Association and the National Safety Council that standardized the size for licence plates for vehicles (except those for motorcycles) at 6 inches (15 cm) in height by 12 inches (30 cm) in width, with standardized mounting holes. The first Nova Scotia licence plate that complied with these standards was issued fifteen years beforehand, in 1941.

No slogans were used on passenger plates during the period covered by this subsection.

Image	Dates issued	Design	Serial format	Serials issued	Notes
	1918	White serial on green flat metal plate; "NOVA SCOTIA", provincial shield and "1918" at left	1234	1 to approximately 9000	
	1919	Black serial on yellow flat metal plate; "NOVA SCOTIA", provincial shield and "1919" at left	12345	1001 to approximately 12000	
	1920	Embossed white serial on dark blue plate with border line; "NOVA SCOTIA", provincial shield and "1920" at left	12345	1001 to approximately 12500	First embossed plate.
	1921	Black serial on light green flat metal plate; "NOVA SCOTIA", provincial shield and "1921" at left	12345	1001 to approximately 13500	
	1922	Embossed white serial on black plate with border line; "NS 22" at left	12-345	1-001 to approximately 15-500	
	1923	Embossed red serial on gray plate with border line; "NOVA SCOTIA 1923" at right	12-345	1-001 to approximately 17-000	
	1924	Embossed yellow serial on black plate with border line; "NS 24" at right	12-345	1-001 to approximately 19-000	
	1925	Embossed black serial on white plate with border line; "NOVA SCOTIA–25" at bottom	12-345	1-001 to approximately 21-000	
	1926	Embossed white serial on dark green plate with border line; "NOVA SCOTIA 1926" at bottom	L12-345	L1-001 to approximately L11-500	'L' prefix used for vehicles weighing 3,000 lb or less, and 'H' prefix for vehicles above 3,000 lb. This happened again in 1927.
	1926	Embossed white serial on dark green plate with border line; "NOVA SCOTIA 1926" at bottom	H12-345	H15-001 to approximately H24-500	'L' prefix used for vehicles weighing 3,000 lb or less, and 'H' prefix for vehicles above 3,000 lb. This happened again in 1927.
	1927	Embossed yellow serial on black plate with border line; "NOVA SCOTIA 1927" at bottom	L12-345	L1-001 to approximately L19-000	
	1927	Embossed yellow serial on black plate with border line; "NOVA SCOTIA 1927" at bottom	H12-345	H19-001 to approximately H29-500	
	1928	Embossed black serial on orange plate with border line; "1928" and "NOVA SCOTIA" centred at top and bottom respectively	12-345	10-001 to approximately 27-500	No letter prefix used for vehicles weighing 3,000 lb or less.
	1928	Embossed black serial on orange plate with border line; "1928" and "NOVA SCOTIA" centred at top and bottom respectively	H12-345	H40-001 to approximately H52-500	No letter prefix used for vehicles weighing 3,000 lb or less.
	1929	Embossed white serial on red plate with border line; "NOVA SCOTIA 29" at bottom	12-345	10-001 to approximately 41-500	
	1930	Embossed red serial on white plate with border line; "30 NOVA SCOTIA" at bottom	12-345	40-001 to approximately 85-000	
	1931	Embossed white serial on black plate with border line; "NOVA SCOTIA 31" at top	12-345	Coded by county group (1)	
	1932	Embossed black serial on yellow plate; "NOVA SCOTIA 32" at bottom	12-345	Coded by county group (1)	
	1933	Embossed orange serial on black plate; "33 NOVA SCOTIA" at bottom	12-345	Coded by county group (1)	
	1934	Embossed white serial on dark blue plate; "NOVA SCOTIA 34" at bottom	12-345	Coded by county group (1)	
	1935	Embossed dark blue serial on white plate; "35-NOVA SCOTIA" at bottom	12-345	Coded by county group (1)	
	1936	Embossed white serial on red plate; "NOVA SCOTIA 36" at top	12-345	Coded by county group (1)	
	1937	Embossed yellow serial on black plate; "37-NOVA SCOTIA" at bottom	12-345	Coded by county group (1)	
	1938	Embossed black serial on yellow plate; "NOVA SCOTIA" and "1938" centred at top and bottom respectively	12-345	Coded by county group (1)	
	1939	Embossed white serial on green plate; "NOVA" and "SCOTIA" centred at top and bottom respectively; vertical "1939" at right	12-345	Coded by county group (1)	
	1940	Embossed white serial on black plate with border line; "NOVA" and "SCOTIA" centred at top and bottom respectively; vertical "1940" at right	12-345	Coded by county group (1)	
	1941	Embossed black serial on cream plate with border line; "NOVA SCOTIA '41" at bottom	1-23-45	Coded by county group (1)	First 6" x 12" plate.
	1942	Embossed black serial on pale green plate with border line; "NOVA SCOTIA" and "1942" centred at top and bottom respectively	1-23-45	Coded by county group (1)	Produced in pairs but only single plates issued; the remaining plates were restamped and repainted for use in 1943 and 1944, due to metal conservation for World War II.
	1943–44	Embossed white serial on black plate with border line; "NOVA SCOTIA" and "1943" centred at top and bottom respectively	1-23-45	Coded by county group (1)	Restamped and repainted 1942 plates. Revalidated for 1944 with windshield stickers.
	1945	Embossed black serial on cream plate with border line; "NOVA SCOTIA '45" at bottom	1-23-45	Coded by county group (1)	
	1946	Embossed black serial on gray plate with border line; "NOVA SCOTIA '46" at top	1-23-45	Coded by county group (1)	
	1947	Embossed white serial on black plate with border line; "NOVA SCOTIA '47" at bottom	1-23-45	Coded by county group (1)	
	1948	Embossed black serial on pale green plate with border line; "NOVA SCOTIA '48" at bottom	1-23-45	Coded by county group (1)	
	1949	Embossed black serial on cream plate with border line; "NOVA SCOTIA '49" at top	1-23-45	Coded by county group (1)	
	1950	Embossed black serial on gray plate with border line; "NOVA SCOTIA - 50" at bottom	1-23-45	Coded by county group (1)	
	1951	Embossed black serial on orange plate with border line; "NOVA SCOTIA - 51" at top	1-23-45	Coded by county group (1)	
	1952	Embossed black serial on unpainted aluminum plate with border line; "NOVA SCOTIA - 52" at bottom	1-23-45	Coded by county group (1)	Revalidated for 1953 with light blue tabs, for 1954 with black tabs, for 1955 with white tabs, and for 1956 with dark green tabs.
	1953	As above, but with "NOVA SCOTIA - 53" at bottom	12-34-56	10-00-00 to 10-99-99	Issued only to new registrants. Validated for 1954, 1955 and 1956 in the same manner as for 1952 plates.
	1953–56	As above, with "NOVA SCOTIA - 52" at bottom	12-34-56	11-00-00 to approximately 16–49–00	Issued only to new registrants. Validated for 1954, 1955 and 1956 in the same manner as for 1952 plates.
	1957	Embossed black serial on white plate with border line; "NOVA SCOTIA '57" at top	1-23-45; 12-34-56	2-00-00 to approximately 13–34–00	
	1958	Embossed light yellow serial on black plate with border line; "NOVA SCOTIA '58" at bottom	1-23-45; 12-34-56	2-00-00 to approximately 13–83–00	
	1959	Embossed black serial on light yellow plate with border line; "NOVA SCOTIA '59" at top	1-23-45; 12-34-56	2-00-00 to approximately 14–70–00	

=== 1960 to present ===
Image	Dates issued	Design	Slogan	Serial format	Serials issued	Notes
	1960–61	Embossed light yellow serial on black plate with border line; "NOVA SCOTIA '60" at bottom	none	1-23-45; 12-34-56	2-00-00 to approximately 18–37–00	Revalidated for 1961 with windshield stickers.
	1962–63	Embossed black serial on light yellow plate with border line; "NOVA SCOTIA '62" at top	none	1-23-45; 12-34-56	2-00-00 to approximately 20–33–00	Revalidated for 1963 with windshield stickers.
	1964–65	Embossed yellow serial on black plate with border line; "NOVA SCOTIA '64" at top	none	1-23-45; 12-34-56	2-00-00 to approximately 22–49–00	Revalidated for 1965 with windshield stickers.
	1966–68	Embossed black serial on yellow plate with border line; "NOVA SCOTIA" at bottom, offset to left; black box at bottom right containing debossed "66"	none	1-23-45; 12-34-56	2-00-00 to approximately 28–20–00	
	1969–71	Embossed yellow serial on black plate; border lines around plate and around bottom corners; "NOVA SCOTIA" centred at bottom; "69" at bottom left	none	1-23-45; 12-34-56	2-00-00 to approximately 29–75–00	
	1972–75	Embossed light blue serial on non-reflective white plate; border lines around plate and around top corners; "NOVA SCOTIA" centred at top	"CANADA'S OCEAN PLAYGROUND" at bottom	1-23-45; 12-34-56	2-00-00 to 38-49-99	Letters I, O and Q not used in the ABC-123 serial format. Material changed from steel to aluminum in 1986.
	1975–79	As above, but reflective and with darker blue elements	"CANADA'S OCEAN PLAYGROUND" at bottom	12-34-56	38-50-00 to 66-39-99	Letters I, O and Q not used in the ABC-123 serial format. Material changed from steel to aluminum in 1986.
	1979–89	As above, but reflective and with darker blue elements	"CANADA'S OCEAN PLAYGROUND" at bottom	ABC-123	AAA-001 to BRS-999	Letters I, O and Q not used in the ABC-123 serial format. Material changed from steel to aluminum in 1986.
	1989–2011	Embossed blue serial on reflective white plate; border lines around plate and around top corners; light blue graphic of the Bluenose screened in the centre; "NOVA SCOTIA" screened in blue centred at top	"CANADA'S OCEAN PLAYGROUND" screened in blue at bottom	ABC 123	BRT 001 to FAD 999	Awarded "Plate of the Year" for best new licence plate of 1989 by the Automobile License Plate Collectors Association, the first and, to date, only time Nova Scotia has been so honored. Co-recipient with Oklahoma.
	2011–present	As above, but without border lines, and with narrower serial dies	"CANADA'S OCEAN PLAYGROUND" screened in blue at bottom	ABC 123	FAE 001 to HTH 021 (as of May 12 2026)	

== Specialty plates ==
Image	Type	Dates issued	Design	Slogan	Serial format	Serials issued	Notes
	Acadian heritage	2012–present	Embossed blue serial on white plate; Flag of Acadia screened at left; "NOVA SCOTIA" and "NOUVELLE-ÉCOSSE" screened in blue centred at top	none	FBC12	FAA01 to FBX48 (as of May 22, 2023)	
	Buy local	2013–present	Embossed blue serial on white plate; Select Nova Scotia logo (a circle with the provincial flag at the top, "Select" in blue handwritten font across the middle and "NOVA SCOTIA" in blue at the bottom) screened at left; "NOVA SCOTIA" screened in blue centred at top	"Buy Local" screened in blue centred at bottom	LBC12	LAA01 to LAN69 (as of March 26, 2023)	Introduced to promote buying local produce.
	Conservation	2003–present	Embossed blue serial on white plate; piping plover screened at left; "NOVA SCOTIA" screened in blue centred at top	"Conservation - Species at Risk" screened in blue centred at bottom	PBC12	PAA01 to PEB03 (as of March 26, 2023)	
	Farmers and Fishermen	1960–present	Embossed blue serial on white plate; "NOVA SCOTIA" and "CANADA'S OCEAN PLAYGROUND" centred at top and bottom respectively, "FM" on left side of number vertically.	"CANADA'S OCEAN PLAYGROUND" screened in blue at bottom	FM 1-23-45		Issued to farmers or fishermen and must be displayed on either a commercial truck that is owned or leased by the farmer or fisherman or a passenger van with a minimum seating capacity of 7 that is owned or leased by the farmer or fisherman.
	Firefighter	1991–present	Embossed blue serial on white plate; Firefighter's Cross at left, with "FD" inside; "NOVA SCOTIA" screened in blue centred at top, "FF" on right side of number vertically.	"FIREFIGHTER" screened in blue centred at bottom	ABC1		Available to career firefighters
	Gaelic heritage	2018–present	Embossed blue serial on white plate; Salmon of Knowledge screened at left; "NOVA SCOTIA" screened in blue centred at top	"ALBA NUADH" screened in blue centred at bottom	GBC12		
	Honorary Consul	1989–present	Embossed blue serial on white plate; “NOVA SCOTIA” and “HONORARY CONSUL” centred at top and bottom respectively	NSC 123			Issued to persons who have been appointed an Honorary Consul
	Mi'kmaq heritage	2018–present	Embossed blue serial on white plate; eight-point star petroglyph screened at left; "NOVA SCOTIA" screened in blue centred at top	"MI'KMA'KI LAND OF THE MI'KMAQ" screened in blue centred at bottom	MBC12	MAA01 to MCA12 (as of May 17, 2023)	
	Veterans	2003–present	Embossed blue serial on white plate; flag of Canada at left; "NOVA SCOTIA" screened in blue centred at top	"VETERAN" screened in blue centred at bottom	ABC12		Nova Scotia was the first province to institute a government-issued Veterans’ Licence Plate to recognize the contributions of veterans.
	Volunteer firefighters	1999–present	Embossed red serial on white plate; Firefighter's Cross at left, with "FD" inside; "NOVA SCOTIA" screened in red centred at top, "VFF" on right side of number vertically.	"VOLUNTEER FIREFIGHTER" screened in red centred at bottom	ABC1		
	Retired volunteer firefighters	2022–present	Embossed red serial on white plate; Firefighter's Cross at left, with "FD" inside; "NOVA SCOTIA" screened in red centred at top	"RETIRED VOLUNTEER FIREFIGHTER" screened in red centred at bottom	RBC12		Issued to retired volunteer firefighters with at least 15 years of service
	Volunteer search and rescue	1999–present	Embossed red serial on white plate; Compass Rose at left; "NOVA SCOTIA" screened in red centred at top; "SAR" vertically at right	"VOLUNTEER" screened in red centred at bottom	ABC1		
	Retired volunteer search and rescue	2022–present	Embossed red serial on white plate; Compass Rose at left; "NOVA SCOTIA" screened in red centred at top; "SAR" vertically at right	"RETIRED VOLUNTEER SEARCH AND RESCUE" screened in red centred at bottom	RBC12		Issued to retired search and rescue volunteers with at least 15 years of service

== Non-passenger plates ==
Image	Type	Dates issued	Design	Serial format	Serials issued	Notes
	All-terrain vehicle	1989–present	Embossed red serial on white plate with red border lines around plate; “NOVA SCOTIA” and “OFF-HIGHWAY” centred at top and bottom respectively	AB·123	AA·001 to MS·999 (as of February 1, 2026)	
	Antique Auto	1966-2009	Embossed blue serial on white plate; border lines around plate and around top corners; "NOVA SCOTIA" and "CANADA'S OCEAN PLAYGROUND" centred at top and bottom respectively, "ANTIQUE AUTO" on left side of number.	1234	0001 to 9999	
	Antique Auto	2009–present	As above, but without border lines	A123	A001 to S628 (as of June 24, 2023)	
	Camper	1977–present	Embossed blue serial on white plate with border line; "NOVA SCOTIA" and "CAMPER" centred at top and bottom respectively and blue provincial crest centered in middle.	12 345		Must be displayed on a vehicle designed or reconstructed, equipped and used or intended to be used primarily for sleeping, eating and living quarters, and includes a motorized home or a bus converted for such purposes.
	Commercial	1978–2012	Embossed black serial on yellow plate; border lines around plate and around top corners; "NOVA SCOTIA" and "COMMERCIAL" centred at top and bottom respectively	12-345-A	10-000-A to 37-519-D	Currently issued to commercial vehicles above 5,000 kg (11,000 lb). Passenger plates issued to lighter commercial vehicles since 1986.
	Commercial	2012–present	As above, but without border lines	12-345-A	37-520-D to 61-129-D (as of January 15, 2024)	Currently issued to commercial vehicles above 5,000 kg (11,000 lb). Passenger plates issued to lighter commercial vehicles since 1986.
	Handicap	1981-2012	Embossed blue serial on white plate; border lines around plate and around top corners; International Symbol of Access screened at left; "NOVA SCOTIA" and "CANADA'S OCEAN PLAYGROUND" centred at top and bottom respectively	1A-23	0A-01 to 9A-99	
	Handicap	2012–present	As above, but without border lines	1A-23		
	Motorcycle	1972–78	Embossed blue serial on non-reflective white plate with border line; "NOVA SCOTIA" at top, offset to left	1-23-45	1-00 to 1-25-99	All motorcycle plates expire on December 31.
	Motorcycle	1978–98	As above, but reflective	1-23-45	1-26-00 to 9-75-99	All motorcycle plates expire on December 31.
	Motorcycle	1998–present	As above, but with rounder serial dies, and "NOVA SCOTIA" centred at top	123456	97600 to 219191 (as of September 17, 2023)	All motorcycle plates expire on December 31.
	Restricted	1974-2012	Embossed black serial on white plate; border lines around plate and around top corners; "RESTRICTED" and "NOVA SCOTIA" centred at top and bottom respectively	R12345		Issued to municipal and province-owned vehicles
	Restricted	2012–present	As above, but without border lines	R12345		Issued to municipal and province-owned vehicles
	Semi-trailer	1993–2012	Embossed red serial on yellow plate; border lines around plate and around top corners; "NOVA SCOTIA" and "OPEN FOR BUSINESS" centred at top and bottom respectively, "PT" on left side of number vertically.	PT 1-23-45	All Trailer plates expire on December 31.	
	Semi-trailer	2012–present	As above, but without border lines	PT 1-23-45	All Trailer plates expire on December 31.	
	Trailer	1981–2012	Embossed black serial on yellow plate; border lines around plate and around top corners; "NOVA SCOTIA" and "CANADA'S OCEAN PLAYGROUND" centred at top and bottom respectively	T1-23-45; T123-456	All Trailer plates expire on December 31.	T1-00 to approximately T339-000
	Trailer	2012–present	As above, but without border lines	T1-23-45; T123-456	All Trailer plates expire on December 31.	T339-001 to T516-513 (as of January 8, 2024)

== Controversies ==
=== GRABHER licence plate ===
In 2017, Lorne Grabher of Nova Scotia had his custom licence plate revoked. The plate displayed his last name 'GRABHER', which he had purchased as a gift for his father in the 1990s. He had received a letter saying his plate would be cancelled as some had found his licence plate to be misogynistic and offensive. Lorne attempted to keep his plate by fighting back in court, claiming it violated his right to freedom of expression. However, in August 2021 the Nova Scotia Court of Appeals ruled his constitutional rights had not been violated. They concluded the plate could not be used as it could be seen as offensive without the correct context. In 2022, the Supreme Court of Canada declined to hear an appeal of his case.
