= Minister of Emergency Management and Community Resilience =

Canadian government executive

- Ministre de la Gestion des urgences et de la Résilience des communautés
- Incumbent; Eleanor Olszewski since May 13, 2025
- Public Safety Canada
- Style: The Honourable
- Member of: Parliament; Privy Council; Cabinet
- Reports to: Parliament; Prime Minister
- Seat: Ottawa, Ontario
- Appointer: Monarch (represented by the governor general); on the advice of the prime minister
- Term length: At His Majesty's pleasure
- Formation: October 26, 2021
- Salary: CA$269,800 (2019)
- Website: www.publicsafety.gc.ca

The minister of emergency management and community resilience (French: ministre de la gestion des urgences et de la résilience des communautés) is a minister of the Crown supported by the Department of Public Safety and Emergency Preparedness. The minister exercises powers under the Emergency Management Act and is responsible for emergency management and disaster response. The minister is a member of the King's Privy Council for Canada and the Canadian Cabinet.

Eleanor Olszewski has served as the minister since May 13, 2025. The minister is selected by the prime minister and appointed by the Crown. The role was first created in 2021 as the minister of emergency preparedness; its current title was adopted in 2025.

== Role and history ==
=== Minister of Emergency Preparedness (2021–2025) ===
Emergency management is typically the responsibility of the minister of public safety and emergency preparedness. The portfolio was split in 2021, when a minister of state, styled as the minister of emergency preparedness, was created to assist the minister of public safety in a Cabinet shuffle following the 2021 federal election. The minister of emergency preparedness exercised the powers of the minister under section 7 of the Emergency Management Act.

=== Minister of Emergency Management and Community Resilience (2025–present) ===
In May 2025, the present role of minister of emergency management and community resilience was introduced, with subsequent orders-in-council issued to designate Public Safety Canada as the department supporting the minister, and transferring section 7 powers to the re-created portfolio.

=== Section 7, Emergency Management Act ===
The Emergency Management Act allows the minister to make orders and regulations to:

- Create and implement emergency management plans
- Use federal resources to response to civil emergencies
- Declare a provincial emergency to be of concern to the federal government
- Provide financial assistance to a province

== List of ministers ==
Key:

Liberal Party of Canada

No.	Portrait	Name	Term of office		Political party	Ministry (Prime Minister)
Minister of Emergency Preparedness
1		Bill Blair	October 26, 2021	July 26, 2023	Liberal	29 (J. Trudeau)
2		Harjit Sajjan	July 26, 2023	March 14, 2025	Liberal	29 (J. Trudeau)
Minister of Emergency Management and Community Resiliance
1		Eleanor Olszewski	May 13, 2025	Incumbent	Liberal	30 (Carney)

== See also ==
- Minister of Public Safety
