= Casara =

Casara may refer to:

- CASARA, the Civil Air Search and Rescue Association, a Canada-wide volunteer aviation organization
- Tristan Casara (born 1987), French musician best known as The Avener
- Danny Casara (fl. 2018), American political candidate
- Chico Casara, member of the band Apocalypse from 1983 to 2003
