= National Search and Rescue Secretariat =

The National Search and Rescue Secretariat (NSS) was an independent portfolio organization within the Government of Canada's Department of National Defence, established in 1986 as one of the recommendations resulting from the Royal Commission of Enquiry into the Ocean Ranger disaster.

From 1986 to 2015, the NSS reported to the Lead Minister for Search and Rescue (LMSAR), who was the Minister of National Defence. The NSS supported and promoted the coordination of the National Search and Rescue Program. This included facilitating the work of the Ground Search and Rescue Council of Canada and the federal Interdepartmental Committee on Search and Rescue (ICSAR). ICSAR members include:

- Canadian Forces (Department of National Defence)
- Canadian Coast Guard (Fisheries and Oceans Canada)
- Royal Canadian Mounted Police (Public Safety Canada)
- Transport Canada
- Meteorological Service of Canada (Environment Canada)
- Parks Canada

NSS worked with provincial and territorial SAR authorities to develop and standardize SAR services. NSS also funded research, studies, workshops and conferences, as well as publishing the quarterly SARSCENE magazine. The NSS also coordinated the Canadian contribution to the COSPAS-SARSAT satellite alerting system, and for several years managed the Canadian registry for distress beacons.

Another recommendation from the Ocean Ranger disaster was to establish the "SAR New Initiatives Fund" (NIF), a federal contribution program that provides funding for new projects or initiatives that will improve the National Search and Rescue Program.

In July 2015, the National SAR Secretariat was moved out of the Defence portfolio and incorporated into the Department of Public Safety and Emergency Preparedness. It is no longer managed as a separate portfolio organization with dedicated corporate functions (communications, finance, grants/contribution programs).

== See also ==
- Provincial Emergency Program (British Columbia)
