= Former Fire Hall No. 3 =

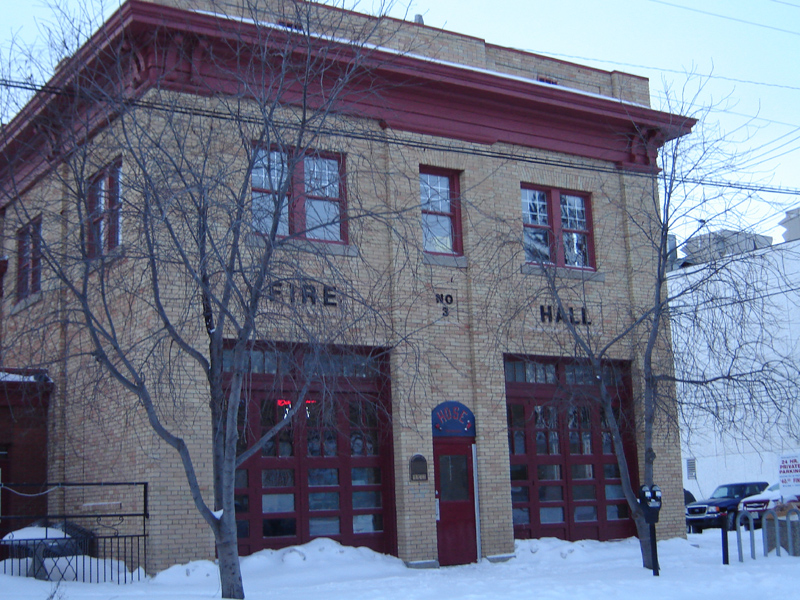
- Former Fire Hall No. 3
- Interactive map of the Former Fire Hall No. 3 area

General information
- Location: 612 11th Street East, Saskatoon, Saskatchewan, Canada
- Coordinates: 52.118652°N 106.655763°W
- Completed: 1911

The Former Fire Hall No. 3 is a municipal designated historic building and former fire hall of the Saskatoon Fire Department located in the Nutana neighborhood of Saskatoon, Saskatchewan, Canada.

== History ==
With the University of Saskatchewan being built on the east side of the river this enhanced the need for a new fire hall on the east side. Built in 1911 with the latest equipment and both horse drawn and gasoline-powered fire fighting equipment the facility was again modernised in 1926. In 1958 the fire department left the facility for a new Fire Hall #3 that was constructed on York Avenue and Taylor Street.

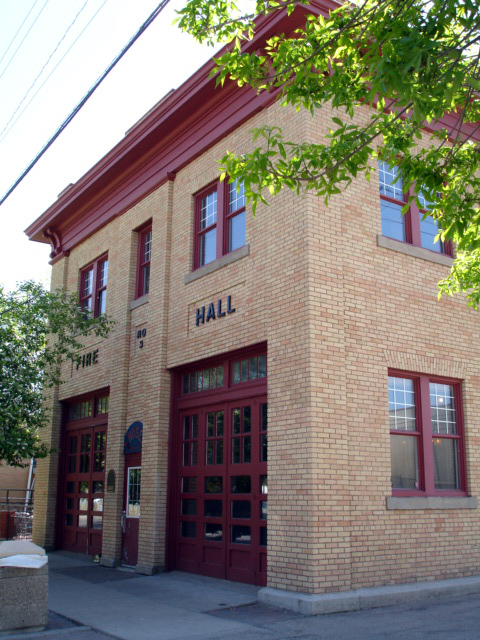
Side View

During the Cold War, the building became the headquarters for the Saskatoon office of Canada's civil defence agency, the Emergency Measures Organization in 1959. The basement was converted into a radiation-proof communications bunker, and an emergency food kitchen was constructed, to be used in the event of nuclear war.

Today the building is privately owned and houses a bar and restaurant.
