= Fire Station No. 6 (Sacramento, California) =

- U.S. National Register of Historic Places
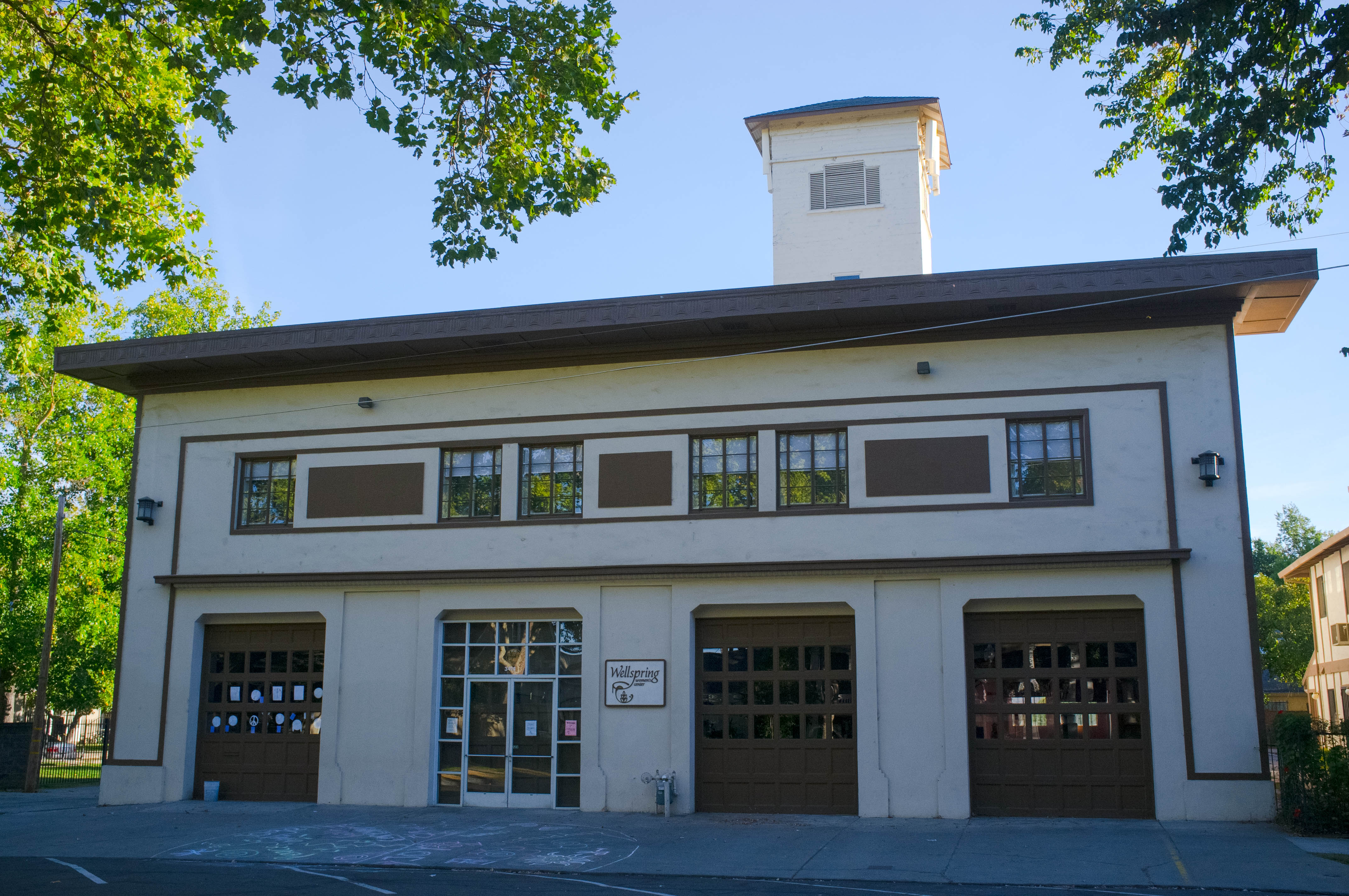

- Location within Sacramento, California Location within California Location within the United States
- Location: 3414 4th Ave., Sacramento, California
- Coordinates: 38°33′01.8″N 121°28′11.6″W
- Area: 0.1 acres (0.040 ha)
- Built: 1915
- Architect: Albert Givan
- Architectural style: Prairie School
- NRHP reference No.: 91000484
- Added to NRHP: April 25, 1991

The Fire Station No. 6 in Sacramento, California, at 3414 4th Ave., was built in 1915. It was listed on the National Register of Historic Places in 1991.

It was designed by Sacramento civil engineer and utility facility designer Albert Givan, and has elements of Prairie School style.

It operated as a fire station until 1979.

== See also ==
- Firehouse No. 3 (Sacramento, California)
- National Register of Historic Places listings in Sacramento County, California
