= Irfan Chaudhry =

Canadian sociologist

- Occupations: Researcher, Director of Office of Human Rights, Diversity, and Equity (OHRDE)
- Known for: Research on hate crime

Academic background
- Education: University of Alberta

Academic work
- Discipline: Sociology, Criminology
- Sub-discipline: Hate crime
- Institutions: McEwan University

Irfan Chaudhry is a hate crime researcher who has served as director of Edmonton, Alberta's MacEwan University's Office of Human Rights, Diversity, and Equity (OHRDE) since February 2018. Chaudry has frequently been consulted by the media for his expert opinion on hate crimes. He taught sociology and criminology at McEwan University for eight years.

== Education ==
When Chaudhry was 18 years old, a teenaged friend was murdered. At first, Chaudry examined and analyzed the issue as much as he could on his own, but within months of the murder, he began taking criminology courses at McEwan University "for the sole purpose of trying to understand what had happened". Within months of the murder Chaudry began to take courses in criminology as an undergraduate at McEwan University and at the University of Alberta. He completed his master's degree in Criminal Justice at the University of Alberta in 2008. Chaudry began his studies towards a doctorate in criminology at the University of Alberta in 2012. Chaudry, who is Muslim, focused on "analyzing racist tweets [on Twitter] from users in six large cities across Canada, including Edmonton". His education and his career focused on "analyzing crime, and one of the driving forces behind criminal activity in [Edmonton]—racism."

== Career ==
From 2010 to 2018, Chaudry taught sociology and criminology at MacEwan University. He also worked on human rights policies for the City of Edmonton and the Edmonton Police Service. Chaudry "worked as a crime analyst for the Edmonton Police Service for two years." He also served on the Alberta Hate Crimes Committee. He worked for the Racism Free Edmonton project as a race-relations specialist. Chaudhry was one of the co-founders of "The Mosquers", to encourage local Muslim youths to make videos of their experience to share with non-Muslims in "order to build an understanding of what it is like to be Muslim". He has been National Expert Committee member on Countering Radicalization to Violence with Public Safety Canada since December 2018 as a volunteer. He has served on the Alberta Hate Crime Committee from 2012 through 2018. He served on the Edmonton Police Service's Community Liaison Committee and on the Chief's Advisory Council from 2012 to 2016.

In November 2013, Chaudry was included in Edmonton's Avenue Magazine annual list of "Top 40 Under 40 young community leaders". In 2018 he became the director of the newly formed Office of Human Rights, Diversity, and Equity (OHRDE) at McEwan University.

=== Office of Human Rights, Diversity, and Equity (OHRDE) ===
Michelle Plouffe, the general counsel and vice-president at McEwan University, conceived of the idea of the Office of Human Rights, Diversity, and Equity (OHRDE) as resource for McEwan students and faculty to provide "information, advice and direction" on issues related to discrimination. In February 2018, Chaudry was named as the first director of the newly formed OHRDE. He was selected because of his experience and his approach. From 2010 to 2018, Chaudry taught sociology and criminology at MacEwan University. He also worked on human rights policies for the City of Edmonton and the Edmonton Police Service, and served on the Alberta Hate Crimes Committee.

In October 2010, the Government of Canada gave a $65,000 Anti-Racism Action Program grant to the "Addressing Racial Discrimination in Hockey" initiative—led by Chaudry. The initiative was also supported by McEwan University's athletics department and other partners in the community.

== Media interviews ==
Since 2015, Chaudhry has appeared as a guest on CBC The National, CBC The Current, CBC Edmonton, CBC Calgary, and CBC Toronto. He is regularly interviewed for his work as hate crime researcher to inform the media on hate related activities in Alberta, Canada.

In a June 23, 2020 CBC interview, Chaudhry, responded to concerns raised about the appointment made by Premier Jason Kenney to the Provincial Court Nominating Committee (PCNC) of Leighton Grey, a lawyer from Cold Lake, Alberta lawyer who "had promoted ... sexist, racist, and anti-Semitic views and far-right conspiracy theories through social media". Chaudry said that it was problematic that Kenney, Justice Minister Doug Schweitzer and Municipal Affairs Minister Kaycee Madu not only refused to apologize for appointing Grey to the PCNC, the committee that chooses provincial judges, but they also "doubled down" on the initial comments by Grey. In effect they were "refusing to acknowledge the root issue of racism and how dangerous hate speech can be, especially from people who are in positions of authority".

Following three incidents of "potential hate-motivated crimes" against members of the LGBT community in early August 2020, Sarah Rieger with Global News interviewed Chaudry to add context to the incident. Chaudry said that Canada's Criminal Code is "very specific in terms of hate-crime legislation" which makes it very difficult to get convictions. This discourages people from reporting incidents to the police. "[More] subtle acts of hate...might not meet the criminal threshold but still have a negative impact on victims". Chaudry said that "there is room for conversation about how existing laws can be supplemented" by "beef up language that we currently have" without changing the actual laws, which is challenging.

In the wake of the February 20, 2021 rally at the Alberta Legislature Building, led by organizers from outside Edmonton, believed to have been tied to known groups that promote racism, misogyny and other forms of hate, Chaudhry said that the rally revealed how Canadian hate laws are ineffective in areas where there are competing rights. He said that the "religious element" added "another layer of complexity as police have to protect freedoms of religion and expression while also dealing with symbols harmful to people of different races. Chaudry cited the example of RCMP declining to lay charges against a man wearing a Ku-Klux-Klan hood outside a Grimshaw post office in February. Chaudry said that Alberta could "create a law banning hate symbols and creating parameters for protests similar to its law on anti-pipeline protests. A municipal bylaw for symbols may be another way. But he said police do have full discretion in how they apply the Criminal Code and can look for creative ways to approaching charges, although they are limited in only laying those that can stick." He said that in general police do "use discretion in really effective ways, whether in hate-related instances or not." He added that police could be "more outspoken about hate symbols given their impact".

In a March 12, 2021 Global News report Chaudry was cited as saying that the case of hateful, racist, and misogynistic messages posted on private property in Vermilion, Alberta could eventually lead to a lawsuit against the small town near Edmonton. The signs were removed in response to a Global News report but Chaudhry said that, the "threshold (for criminal hate speech) is really high in Canada. There's a number of conditions that have to be met." Chaudhry said that the town of Vermillion, along with criminal charges, could also file a civil suit if "any of the signs are libellous or defamatory" and/or the town could pass a bylaw prohibiting such signage. Chaudry said that there is a potential for the town to be sued under the Charter of Rights and Freedoms so they should be proactive. The town of Vermillion could become a "starting place for other municipalities across the province to consider similar actions".

Chaudry reported in an Edmonton Journal article that while there was an increase in hate crimes in Alberta in 2018, there was also improved reporting of hate crimes. Chaudry was interviewed following the release of the 190-page 2019 report by the federally-funded Organization for the Prevention of Violence (OPV) entitled "Building Awareness, Seeking Solutions: Extremism and Hate Motivated Violence in Alberta". The report identified six extremist groups operating in Alberta.

Chaudry was the featured guest in a 25-minute Global News March 16, 2021 podcast "Tiki torch marches in Alberta" in their This is Why series.
