= Emergency Preparedness Act =

The Emergency Preparedness Act (French: Loi sur la protection civile) was a legislative act of the Canadian Parliament. It was passed in 1988 during the Mulroney government and repealed in August 2007 by the Harper government during the 39th Canadian Parliament. It was replaced by the Emergency Management Act.
