= Carlton Fire Station =

Heritage listed building in Victoria, Australia

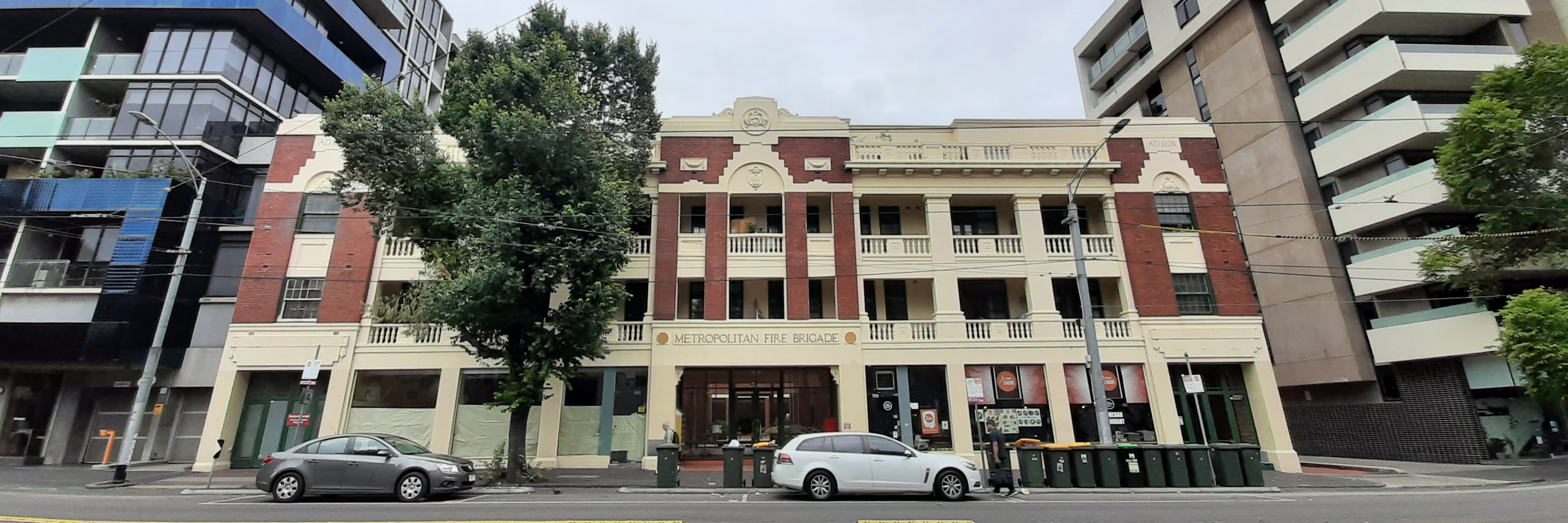

- Location within Australia
- 37.801290°S 144.964074°E
- Location: Carlton, Victoria

History
- Built: 1927–1929

Site notes
- Architectural style: Edwardian Baroque

Victorian Heritage Register

The Carlton Fire Station, or Fire Station No. 3 or Former Carlton Fire Station, on Swanston Street in Carlton, Victoria, a suburb of Melbourne, Australia, is a historic fire station which was built in 1927–1929.

It was deemed of state level heritage significance in Victoria by the Victoria Heritage Council.

It was designed by Cedric Haese Ballantyne (1876–1957) in late Edwardian Baroque style, and was deemed "an excellent representative example" of the numerous Metropolitan Fire Brigade fire stations that he designed.

It is a three-storey brick and stucco building. It has a central entrance leading to a courtyard. Residences for single and married men were on the first and second storeys, and the ground floor on Swanston Street was commercial lease space. It has a balustraded parapet.

The fire station ceased operations on 20 May 1997 and moved on the same day to a new fire station on Bouverie Street, Carlton, just a block away.

The building was converted to residential apartments in 2000.

It is located at 650-656 or 644-656 Swanston Street.
