= Fire House No. 3 =

- U.S. National Register of Historic Places
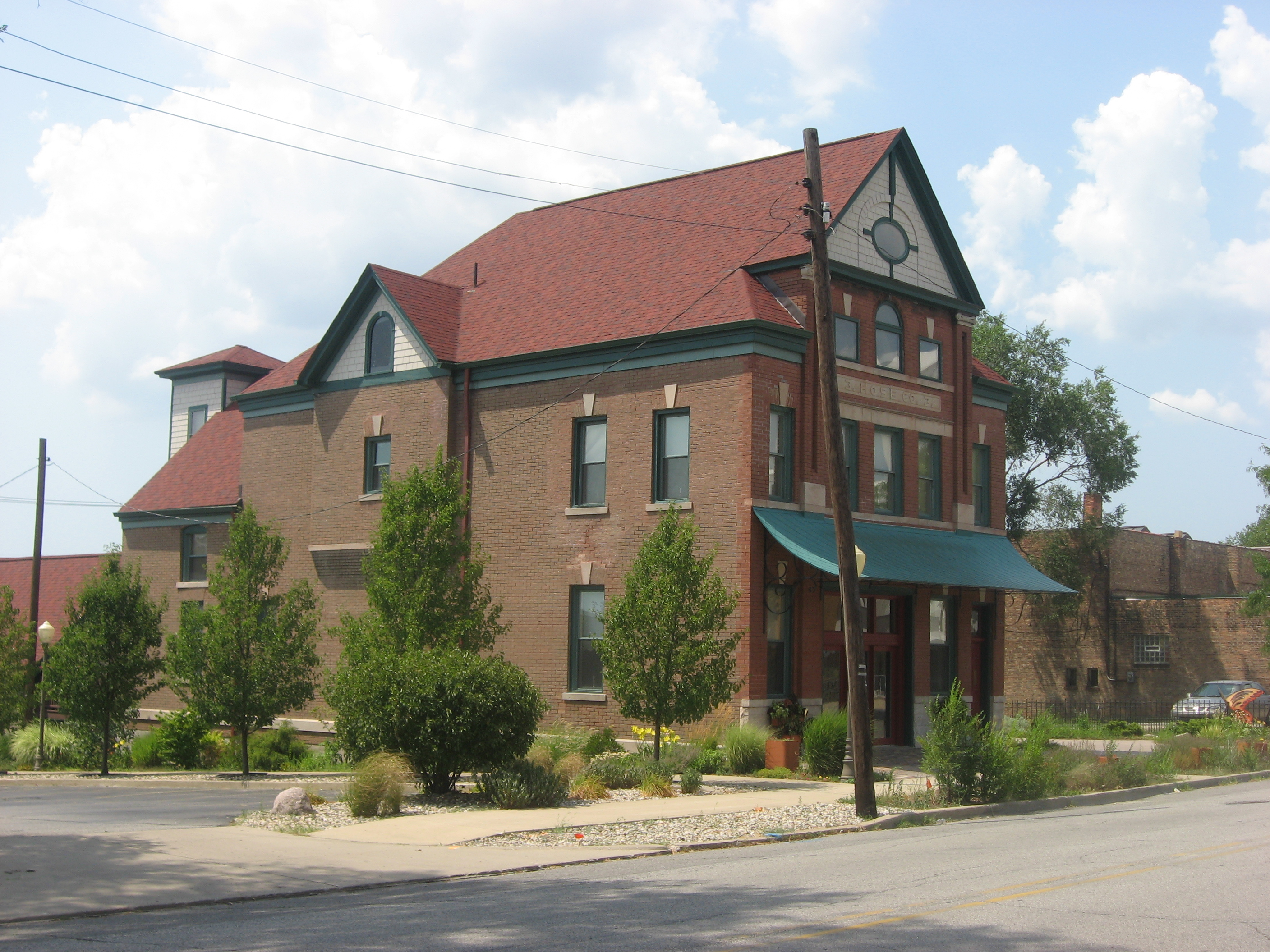
- Fire House 3, July 2012

- Location within Indiana Location within the United States
- Location: 219 N. Hill St., South Bend, Indiana
- Coordinates: 41°40′42″N 86°14′36″W
- Area: less than one acre
- Built: 1892
- Architect: Brehmer, Charles A.
- Architectural style: Queen Anne
- MPS: East Bank MPS
- NRHP reference No.: 99000177
- Added to NRHP: February 18, 1999

Fire House No. 3 is a historic fire station located at South Bend, Indiana. It was built in 1892, and is a 2 1/2-story, rectangular, Queen Anne style brick building. It has a gable front and cross-gable roof and features a simple square hose drying tower. It remained in use as a fire station until the 1960s, after which it was adapted for commercial uses.

It was listed on the National Register of Historic Places in 1999.
