= Office of Critical Infrastructure Protection and Emergency Preparedness =

Agency overview
- Formed: 2001
- Jurisdiction: Canada
- Headquarters: 257 Slater Street Ottawa, Ontario K1A 0M6 Canada
- Minister responsible: Eleanor Olszewski, Minister of Emergency Management and Community Resilience
- Parent department: Public Safety Canada

The Office of Critical Infrastructure Protection and Emergency Preparedness (OCIPEP) is a Canadian government bureau that was created during Anne McLellan's tenure at the Department of Public Safety and Emergency Preparedness (PSEP).

In line with the April 2004 Martin government policy document entitled Securing an Open Society: Canada's National Security Policy, the OCIPEP was removed from the ambit of the Department of National Defence into Public Safety Canada, with many of its functions being taken over by the Government Operations Centre.

Today, the OCIPEP is tasked with ensuring Canada is prepared for failures of critical physical and digital infrastructure resulting from accidents, natural disasters, or deliberate attacks. The OCIPEP is also responsible for providing coordinated leadership and direction should such events occur. Such infrastructure includes energy production and distribution, transportation, the financial sector, telecommunications, and continuity of government. This work requires the OCIPEP to work closely with other federal and provincial agencies, especially the Canadian Security Intelligence Service and Royal Canadian Mounted Police.

== History ==
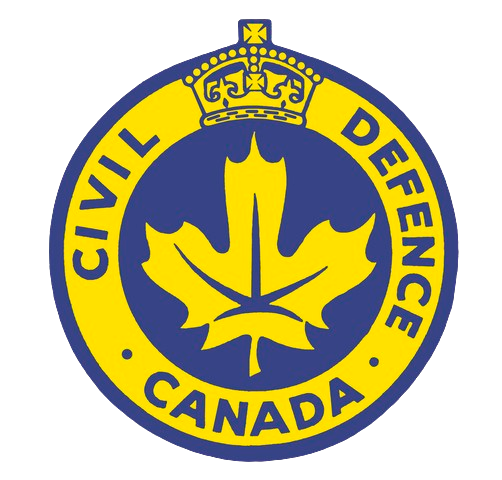
Logo of Canadian Civil Defence

Canada's civil defence measures evolved over time. As with many other matters in Canada, responsibility is shared between the federal and provincial government. The first post-WWII civil defence co-ordinator, Major-General F.F. Worthington, was appointed in October 1948 "to supervise the work of federal, provincial and municipal authorities in planning for public air-raid shelters, emergency food and medical supplies, and the evacuation of likely target areas". Civil Defence in Canada was originally under the authority of the Department of National Defence however, in 1951, civil defence operations were made the responsibility of the Department of National Health and Welfare. This change was the result of two of federal-provincial conferences, where the two levels of government agreed to share responsibility for civil defence.

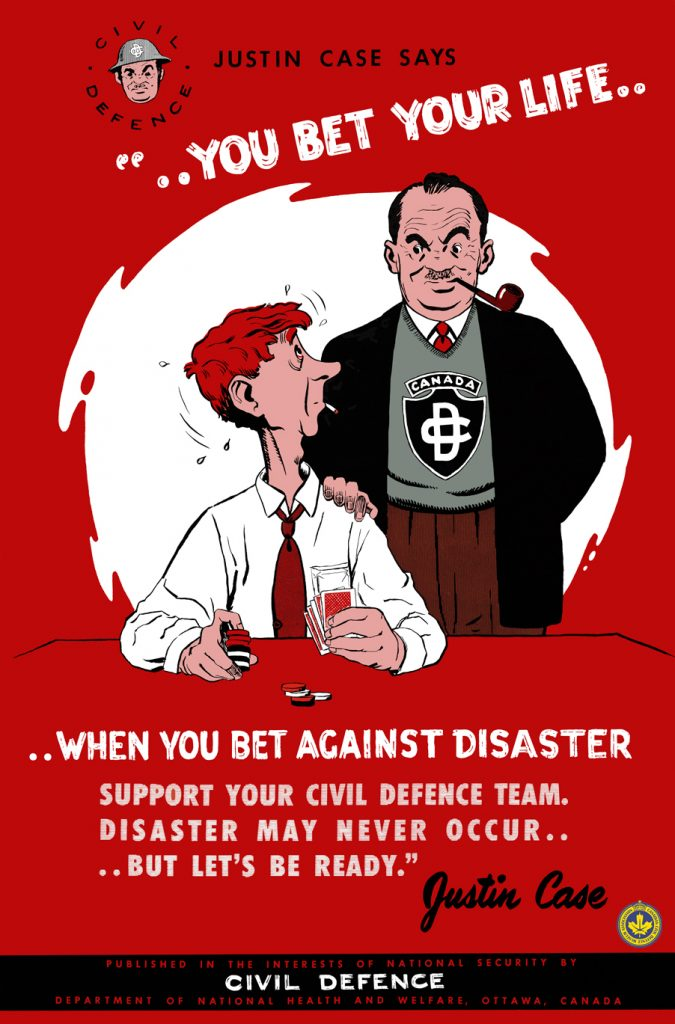
Justin Case Civil Defence Poster c.1950s

In 1959, the Government of Canada, under John Diefenbaker handed authority for civilian defense to the Emergency Measures Organisation (EMO). Large fallout shelters, known as "Diefenbunkers" were built at rural locations outside major cities across Canada at the height of the Cold War during the infancy of the ICBM threat. During this period, a large emphasis was placed on civil defence, with the Government of Canada producing guides and propaganda on the importance of civilians' role in keeping Canada safe from foreign threats. The Government frequently produced material featuring "Justin Case" and "Bea Alerte" as mascots of civil defence.

In 1974, the EMO became Emergency Planning Canada, then Emergency Preparedness Canada in 1986. In February 2001, the Government replaced Emergency Preparedness Canada with the Office of Critical Infrastructure Protection and Emergency Preparedness (OCIPEP), responsible for civilian emergency planning in both peace and war.
