= National Search and Rescue Program =

Canadian government program

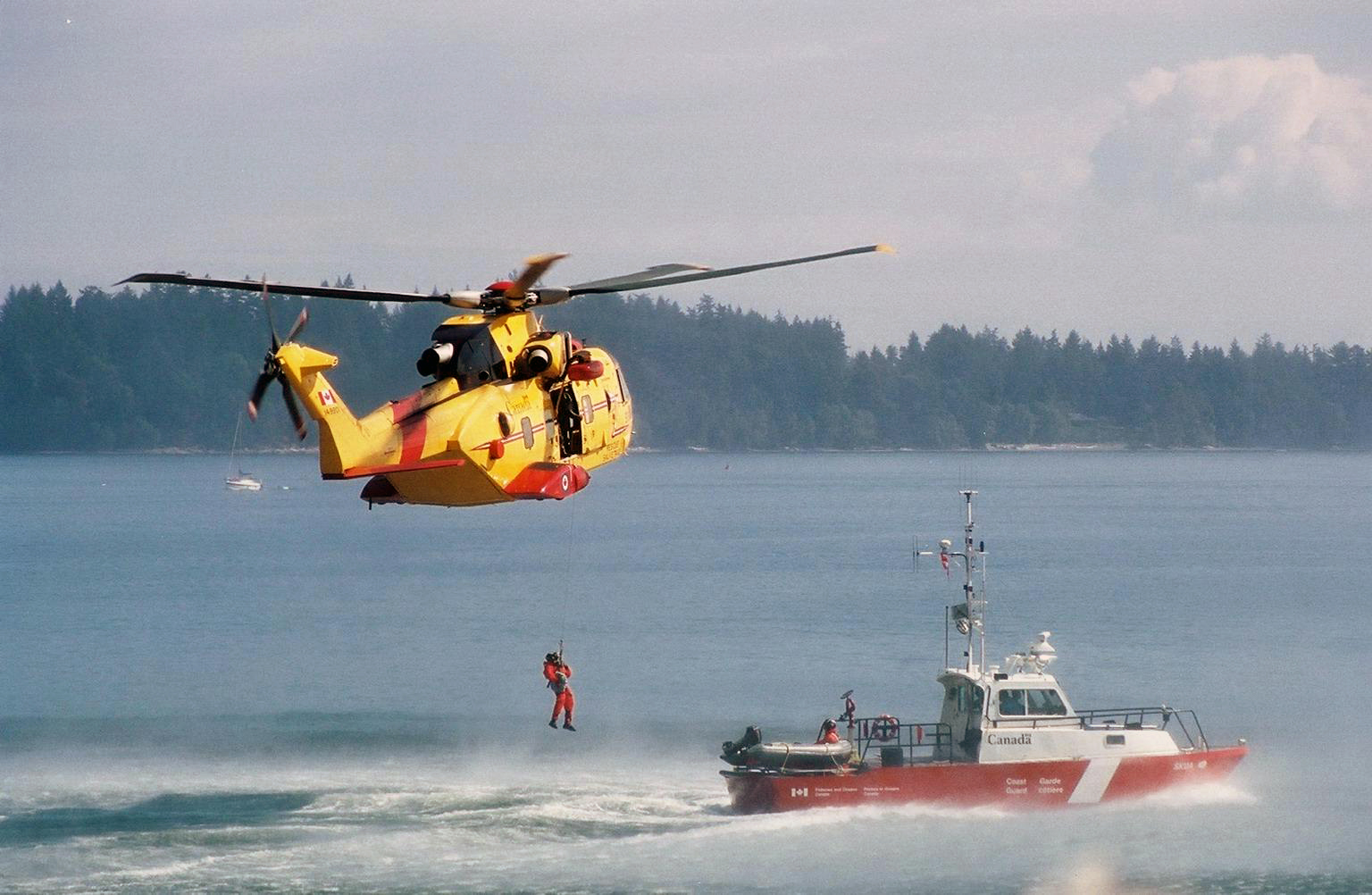
A Royal Canadian Air Force CH-149 Cormorant SAR helicopter hoists a man from a Canadian Coast Guard vessel.

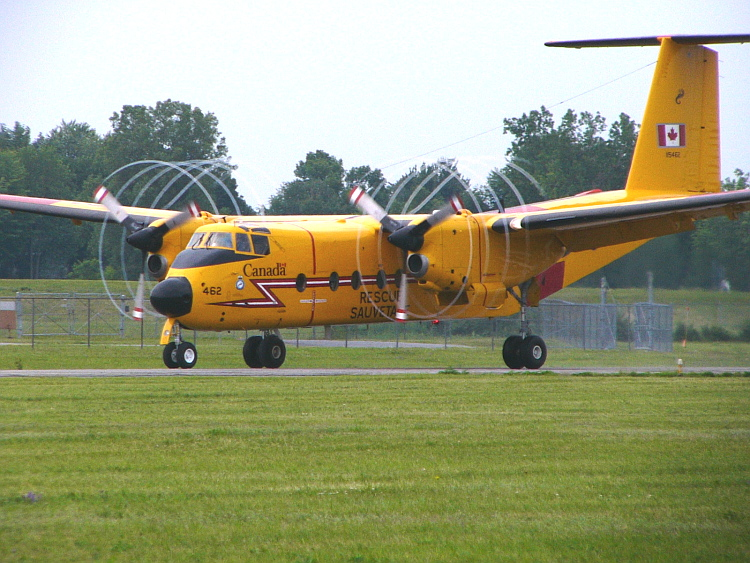
A Royal Canadian Air Force (RCAF) CC-115 Buffalo fixed wing SAR aircraft from 442 Transport and Rescue Squadron. All Buffalo aircraft in the RCAF are based at CFB Comox and are tasked exclusively by JRCC Victoria.

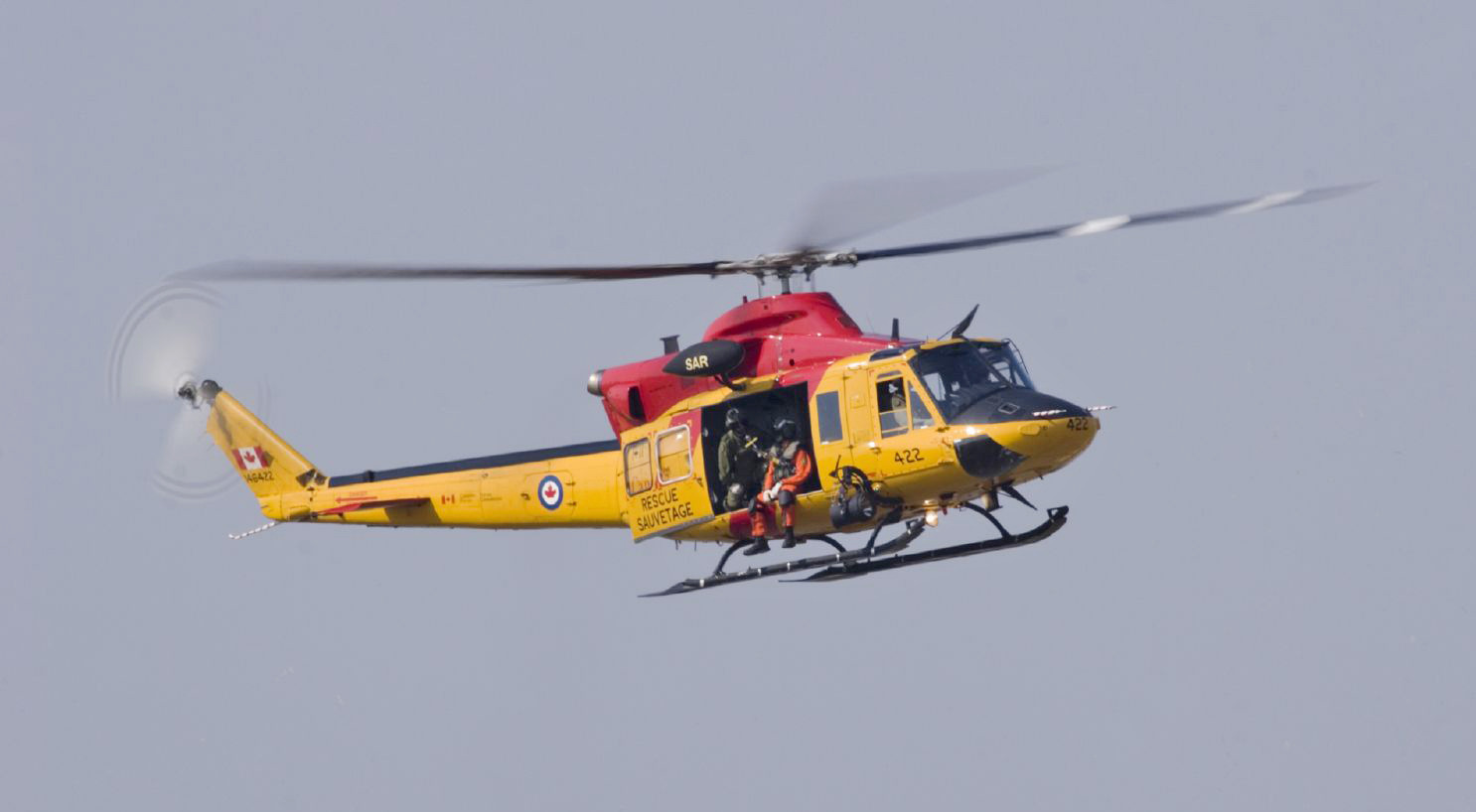
A Royal Canadian Air Force (RCAF) CH-146 Griffon helicopter in the SAR paint scheme. From their acquisition by the RCAF in 1995 until 2005, the only Griffons used for SAR were in "combat support squadrons" at major RCAF bases to provide SAR support in the event of the loss of another RCAF aircraft. Combat support squadrons flying the Griffon are located at CFB Cold Lake, CFB Bagotville and CFB Goose Bay. In 2005 424 Transport and Rescue Squadron at CFB Trenton re-equipped with the Griffon to replace its fleet of CH-149 Cormorants as a primary SAR helicopter for central Canada.

The National Search and Rescue Program (NSP) is the name given by the Government of Canada to the collective search and rescue (SAR) activities in Canada. Until 2015, the NSP was administered by the National Search and Rescue Secretariat (NSS).

Although the NSP is neither defined nor operated as a formal program of the Government of Canada, the primary goal of the NSP is understood to be saving lives at risk by providing response and prevention services throughout Canada's Search and Rescue Region of Responsibility (SRR). This area includes all of Canada's land mass as well as areas of the Atlantic, Pacific, and Arctic oceans as designated by the International Maritime Organization (IMO) and International Civil Aviation Organization (ICAO). By this definition, the NSP encompasses federal departments, provincial and territorial governments, municipalities, non-profit organizations, and volunteers working together to provide search and rescue in Canada.

== Organizational structure ==
1986-2015

The National Search and Rescue Secretariat (NSS) was established in 1986 as a national coordinating authority for SAR policy in Canada, as one of the key recommendations resulting from the Royal Commission of Inquiry into the Ocean Ranger disaster. The NSS operated for almost thirty years as an independent portfolio organization within the Department of National Defence, reporting directly to the Minister of National Defence. During this time, the Minister of National Defence was the Lead Minister for Search and Rescue (LMSAR) in the Government of Canada.

The NSS operated out of 275 Slater Street in Ottawa, providing dedicated communications services to the National SAR Program including a quarterly magazine, SARscene and annual conference; facilitating federal, provincial/territorial, and regional SAR program coordinating committees; administering the SAR New Initiatives fund, a contribution program aimed at enhancing the practice of search and rescue in Canada; leading Canada's participation in the international satellite system for search and rescue, COSPAS-SARSAT; and delivering programs aimed at promoting safety and preparedness. The NSS also enabled formal recognition of outstanding contributions of the national search and rescue community through the annual National SAR Program Awards of Excellence

2015 onward

In July 2015, the Secretariat was absorbed into the Emergency Management and Programs branch of Public Safety Canada. The Minister of Public Safety and Emergency Preparedness assumed responsibility for the National SAR Program, though it is not known if the title and associated responsibilities of 'Lead Minister for Search and Rescue' were also formally carried forward.

== Delivery of SAR services in Canada ==
The delivery of search and rescue services in Canada continues to be partitioned according to the geographic, functional, and government jurisdiction in which a person happens to find themselves in distress, as described below:

=== Aviation and Marine Search and Rescue ===
The Department of National Defence is the lead federal department responsible for providing and coordinating SAR response for incidents involving aircraft. This is accomplished through the Royal Canadian Air Force (RCAF), which provides personnel (air controllers) for the three Joint Rescue Coordination Centres (JRCCs) as well as various dedicated SAR squadrons of helicopters and fixed-wing aircraft.

The Department of Fisheries and Oceans is tasked with responding to emergencies involving vessels that occur in waters of federal responsibility; this includes all navigable ocean waters on Canada's Atlantic, Pacific and Arctic coasts, plus the Great Lakes, St. Lawrence River, and portions of connecting waterways. This is accomplished through the Canadian Coast Guard (CCG), which provides personnel (marine controllers) for the three JRCCs, as well as various dedicated SAR vessels for inshore, near shore and off shore operations.

The three JRCCs are:

- Joint Rescue Coordination Centre Halifax (JRCC Halifax), responsible for the Halifax Search and Rescue Region (Halifax SRR)
- Joint Rescue Coordination Centre Trenton (JRCC Trenton), responsible for the Trenton Search and Rescue Region (Trenton SRR)
- Joint Rescue Coordination Centre Victoria (JRCC Victoria), responsible for the Victoria Search and Rescue Region (Victoria SRR)

The Department of Transport, through its civil aviation and marine safety programs, plays a supporting role to the NSP by working to prevent air and marine transport incidents requiring a search and rescue response. This is accomplished through policies relating to regulations, inspections, enforcement, and safety promotion functions.

==== Federal air resources ====
Air resources for responding to search and rescue incidents in Canada are coordinated by, and often supplied by, the Royal Canadian Air Force (RCAF). Due to their rapid response, air resources are often the first equipment tasked to respond in remote inland, coastal or offshore locations, regardless of whether it is for an aircraft or marine incident.

- The RCAF provides all primary air resources for responding to a federal air or marine SAR incident. RCAF squadrons dedicated to SAR operations are stationed at CFB Gander, CFB Greenwood, CFB Trenton, CFB Winnipeg, and CFB Comox. Combat support squadrons are also located at CFB Cold Lake, CFB Bagotville, and CFB Goose Bay.
- Other aircraft operated by other federal government departments and agencies such as the RCMP, Department of Transport, or the Department of Fisheries and Oceans and Canadian Coast Guard may be requested as secondary air resources by the RCAF.
- The Civil Air Search and Rescue Association (CASARA) supplies civilian aircraft flown by volunteer pilot owners in support of the RCAF's SAR operations upon the request of the RCAF.
- Under ICAO conventions, any aircraft of opportunity that may be transiting the search area may be requested by the RCAF to participate in the search, provided the aircraft of opportunity is able to.

==== Federal marine resources ====
Marine resources for responding to federal search and rescue incidents in Canada are coordinated by, and often supplied by, the Canadian Coast Guard (CCG). Marine resources are most often tasked to respond to a marine incident in waters of federal jurisdiction, however, they can also be tasked to respond to incidents involving an aircraft if that should also occur in waters of federal jurisdiction.

- The CCG provides all primary marine resources for responding to SAR incidents in waters of federal jurisdiction. This includes dedicated SAR vessels stationed at strategic locations as well as the rest of the CCG fleet.
- Other vessels operated by other federal government departments and agencies such as the Royal Canadian Navy (RCN) or RCMP may be requested as secondary marine resources by the CCG.
- The Canadian Coast Guard Auxiliary (CCGA) supplies civilian vessels sailed by volunteer owners in support of the CCG's SAR operations upon the request of the CCG.
- Under IMO conventions, any vessel of opportunity that may be transiting the search area may be requested by the CCG to participate in the search, provided the vessel of opportunity is able to.

=== Ground and Inland Water Search and Rescue ===
==== National Parks ====
Within Canada's national parks, a federal jurisdiction, SAR resources and operations are supplied and coordinated by Parks Canada. This also includes national marine conservation areas, national park reserves, national historic sites, and national historic canals. In larger national parks that see a high degree of visitor usage, or have unique dangers for park visitors (e.g. ocean waters, mountains, back country, etc.), Parks Canada supplies its own dedicated SAR resources in the form of specialized staff and equipment. Parks Canada may also request support from other federal resources, including the RCAF, CCG, Royal Canadian Mounted Police (RCMP) as well as provincial/territorial or municipal resources, depending on the location of the incident.

==== Provinces and Territories ====
In areas of provincial or territorial jurisdiction (e.g. on land or in inland lakes and rivers that are non-federal waters), SAR resources are coordinated by provincial or territorial governments. Response to, and the coordination and supply of resources to, a ground or inland water SAR incident in a province or territory is the responsibility of the provincial or territorial police agency (or a municipal police agency). That police agency, in coordination with the provincial or territorial (or municipal) government, may request federal resources to assist in responding to a ground or inland water SAR incident. This is often in the form of RCAF or CASARA aircraft and occasionally in the form of CCG or CCGA vessels (usually trailer deployed small craft). In the more remote parts of Canada, the Canadian Rangers may be requested to perform search and rescue missions in support of federal and provincial/territorial cases. These requests are coordinated through inter-government agreements.

Commercial air operators, in particular those operating helicopters, are also frequently called upon to assist provincial and territorial authorities with ground and inland water search and rescue missions. Many are certified to Transport Canada standards in the use of Helicopter Flight Rescue Systems (HFRS) or Helicopter External Transport Systems (HETS), and train routinely with the volunteer and Parks Canada specialists who conduct these types of rescue missions.

All provinces and territories have volunteer ground search and rescue (GSAR) organizations that are available to assist the responding police agency by providing trained searchers, equipment, and local knowledge. Some volunteer teams have advanced capabilities in search management and high-angle, swift water, ice, and/or avalanche rescue. Canine teams specialized in search and rescue are also an important component of the GSAR volunteer community. The Search and Rescue Volunteer Association of Canada (SARVAC) is the national body representing ground and inland water SAR volunteers in Canada.

Alberta

In Alberta, the provincial government agency responsible for coordinating volunteer ground and inland water SAR is the Office of the Fire Commissioner. The RCMP is contracted to provide provincial policing services in Alberta and they, or a municipal police force, are responsible for responding to ground and inland water SAR incidents in the province; however, this responsibility may be delegated to other agencies, namely Kanaskis Country Public Safety section of Alberta Environment and Parks. Volunteer ground search and rescue (GSAR) teams are represented by the SAR Association of Alberta.

British Columbia

In British Columbia, the provincial government agency responsible for coordinating volunteer ground and inland water SAR is Emergency Management BC. The RCMP is contracted to provide provincial policing services in British Columbia and they, or a municipal police force, are responsible for responding to ground and inland water SAR incidents in the province. Volunteer ground search and rescue (GSAR) teams are represented by the BC Search and Rescue Association.

Manitoba

In Manitoba, the provincial government agency responsible for coordinating volunteer ground and inland water SAR is the Manitoba Office of the Fire Commissioner. The RCMP is contracted to provide provincial policing services in Manitoba and they, or a municipal police force, are responsible for responding to ground and inland water SAR incidents in the province. Volunteer ground search and rescue (GSAR) teams are represented by Search and Rescue Manitoba.

Newfoundland and Labrador

In Newfoundland and Labrador, the provincial government agency responsible for coordinating volunteer ground and inland water SAR is Fire and Emergency Services-Newfoundland and Labrador. Policing services in Newfoundland and Labrador are shared between the Royal Newfoundland Constabulary (RNC) in urban areas and the RCMP in rural areas. These police agencies are responsible for responding to ground and inland water SAR incidents in the province. Volunteer ground search and rescue (GSAR) teams are represented by the Newfoundland and Labrador Search and Rescue Association.

New Brunswick

In New Brunswick, the provincial government agency responsible for coordinating volunteer ground and inland water SAR is the New Brunswick Emergency Measures Organization. The RCMP is contracted to provide provincial policing services in New Brunswick and they, or a municipal police force, are responsible for responding to ground and inland water SAR incidents in the province. Volunteer ground search and rescue (GSAR) teams are represented by the New Brunswick Ground Search and Rescue Association.

Northwest Territories

In the Northwest Territories, the territorial government agency responsible for coordinating volunteer ground and inland water SAR is the Northwest Territories Emergency Measures Organization. The RCMP is contracted to provide policing services in the Northwest Territories and are responsible for responding to ground and inland water SAR incidents in the territory. Volunteer ground search and rescue (GSAR) teams are represented by the Northwest Territories Search and Rescue Association.

Nova Scotia

In Nova Scotia, the provincial government agency responsible for coordinating volunteer ground and inland water SAR is the Nova Scotia Emergency Management Office. The RCMP is contracted to provide provincial policing services in Nova Scotia and they, or a municipal police force, are responsible for responding to ground and inland water SAR incidents in the province. Volunteer ground search and rescue (GSAR) teams are represented by the Nova Scotia Ground Search and Rescue Association.

Nunavut

In Nunavut, the territorial government agency responsible for coordinating volunteer ground and inland water SAR is Nunavut Emergency Management. The RCMP is contracted to provide policing services in Nunavut and are responsible for responding to ground and inland water SAR incidents in the territory. Volunteer ground search and rescue (GSAR) teams are represented by the Nunavut Search and Rescue Association.

Ontario

In Ontario, the provincial government agency responsible for coordinating volunteer ground and inland water SAR is Emergency Management Ontario. The Ontario Provincial Police (OPP) provides all provincial policing services in Ontario and they, or a municipal police force, are responsible for responding to ground and inland water SAR incidents in the province. Volunteer ground search and rescue (GSAR) teams are represented by the Ontario Search and Rescue Volunteer Association.

Prince Edward Island

In Prince Edward Island, the provincial government agency responsible for coordinating volunteer ground and inland water SAR is the Prince Edward Island Emergency Measures Organization. The RCMP is contracted to provide provincial policing services in Prince Edward Island and they, or a municipal police force, are responsible for responding to ground and inland water SAR incidents in the province. Volunteer ground search and rescue (GSAR) teams are represented by the Prince Edward Island Ground Search and Rescue Association.

Quebec

In Quebec, the provincial government agency responsible for coordinating volunteer ground and inland water SAR is the Ministère de la Sécurité publique. The Sûreté du Québec (SQ) provides all provincial policing services in Quebec and they, or a municipal police force, are responsible for responding to ground and inland water SAR incidents in the province. Volunteer ground search and rescue (GSAR) teams are represented by the Association québécoise des bénévoles en recherche et sauvetage.

Saskatchewan

In Saskatchewan, the provincial government agency responsible for coordinating volunteer ground and inland water SAR is the Saskatchewan Emergency Management Organization. The RCMP is contracted to provide provincial policing services in Saskatchewan and they, or a municipal police force, are responsible for responding to ground and inland water SAR incidents in the province. Volunteer ground search and rescue (GSAR) teams are represented by the Search and Rescue Saskatchewan Association of Volunteers.

Yukon

In Yukon, the territorial government agency responsible for coordinating volunteer ground and inland water SAR is the Yukon Emergency Measures Organization. The RCMP is contracted to provide policing services in Yukon and are responsible for responding to ground and inland water SAR incidents in the territory. Volunteer ground search and rescue (GSAR) teams are represented by the Yukon Search and Rescue Association.
