= Firehouse No. 3 (Sacramento, California) =

- U.S. National Register of Historic Places
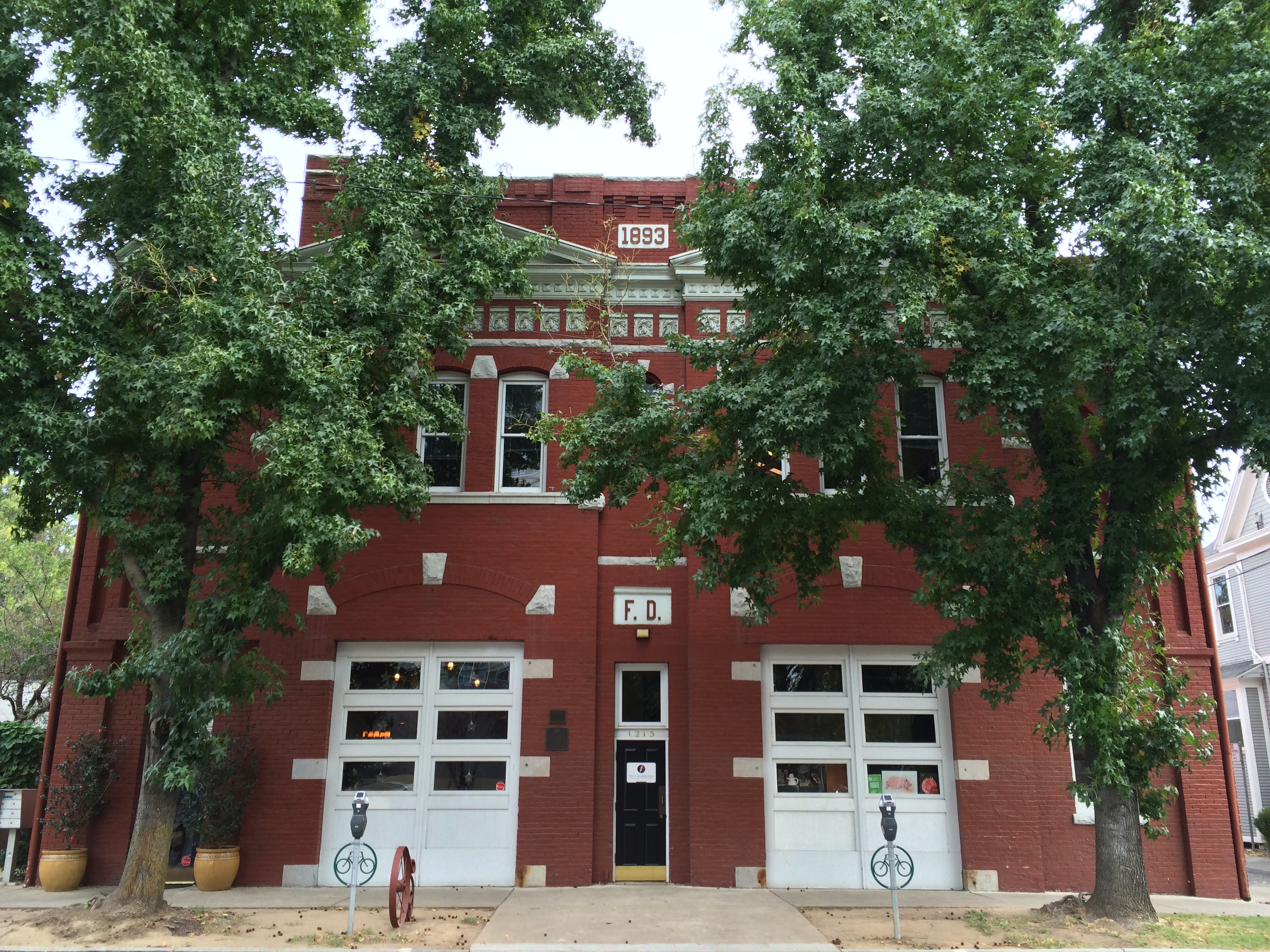

- Location within Sacramento, California Location within California Location within the United States
- Location: 1215 19th St., Sacramento, California
- Coordinates: 38°34′28″N 121°28′52″W
- Area: 1 acre (0.40 ha)
- Built: 1893
- Architectural style: Classical Revival
- NRHP reference No.: 91001537
- Added to NRHP: October 29, 1991

The Firehouse No. 3 in Sacramento, California, which has also been known as Engine Co. #3 Firehouse, was built in 1893. It is located at 1215 19th St. It was listed on the National Register of Historic Places in 1991.

It is two-story-plus 59 by 67 feet (18 m × 20 m) plan building with elements of Classical Revival style including its symmetry, pediments, and decoration.

== See also ==
- Fire Station No. 6 (Sacramento, California)
- National Register of Historic Places listings in Sacramento County, California
