= Emergency Management Act =

Parliament of Canada
- Citation: S.C. 2007, c. 15
- Territorial extent: Canada
- Enacted: June 2007
- Commenced: August 2007

Related legislation
- Emergency Preparedness Act
- Status: Current legislation

The Emergency Management Act (French: Loi sur la gestion des urgences) is an Act of the Canadian government. It was passed in June 2007 during the minority Harper government. It came into force in August 2007, and it revoked the Emergency Preparedness Act in so doing. It named the Minister of Public Safety and Emergency Preparedness as its enforcer, who is responsible under the Act for many things, including conducting exercises and providing education and training related to emergency management.

Furthermore, each Minister of the Crown is responsible under Section 6 of the Act:

to identify the risks that are within or related to his or her area of responsibility — including those related to critical infrastructure — and to do the following in accordance with the policies, programs and other measures established by the Minister:

1. prepare emergency management plans in respect of those risks;
2. maintain, test and implement those plans; and
3. conduct exercises and training in relation to those plans.

== Emergency Management Plans of Natural Resources Canada ==
An audit process, which complies with the Internal Auditing Standards of the Government of Canada, of Natural Resources Canada's responsibilities under the Act discovers nine Emergency Management Plans (EMPs):

- Wildland Fires;
- Geological Hazards;
- Space Weather;
- Geomatics Support;
- Nuclear Explosions Monitoring;
- Nuclear and Radiological Incidents;
- Energy Supply Disruption;
- Offshore/onshore Oil and Gas Incidents; and
- Non-fuel Mineral and Metal Commodities and Production Shortages Support.
