= Tip (law enforcement) =

A tip, in law enforcement, is a piece of information regarding a crime or other activity of interest to law enforcement, usually by a source outside of the law enforcement agency. A tip might provide law enforcement personnel with a direction to pursue in the investigation of a crime, and it might be made anonymously, or by a known source whom the recipient might have reason to trust or distrust. In United States law, by itself, a tip generally does not provide probable cause to make an arrest or perform a search of someone's property, but it may be a factor contributing to probable cause if corroborating evidence can be found.

Many law enforcement agencies maintain a tip line to enable citizens to report suspicious activities generally, or to provide information about a particular crime currently under investigation.
