= Eleanor Olszewski =

Canadian politician (born 1954/1955)

The Honourable Eleanor Olszewski PC KC MP
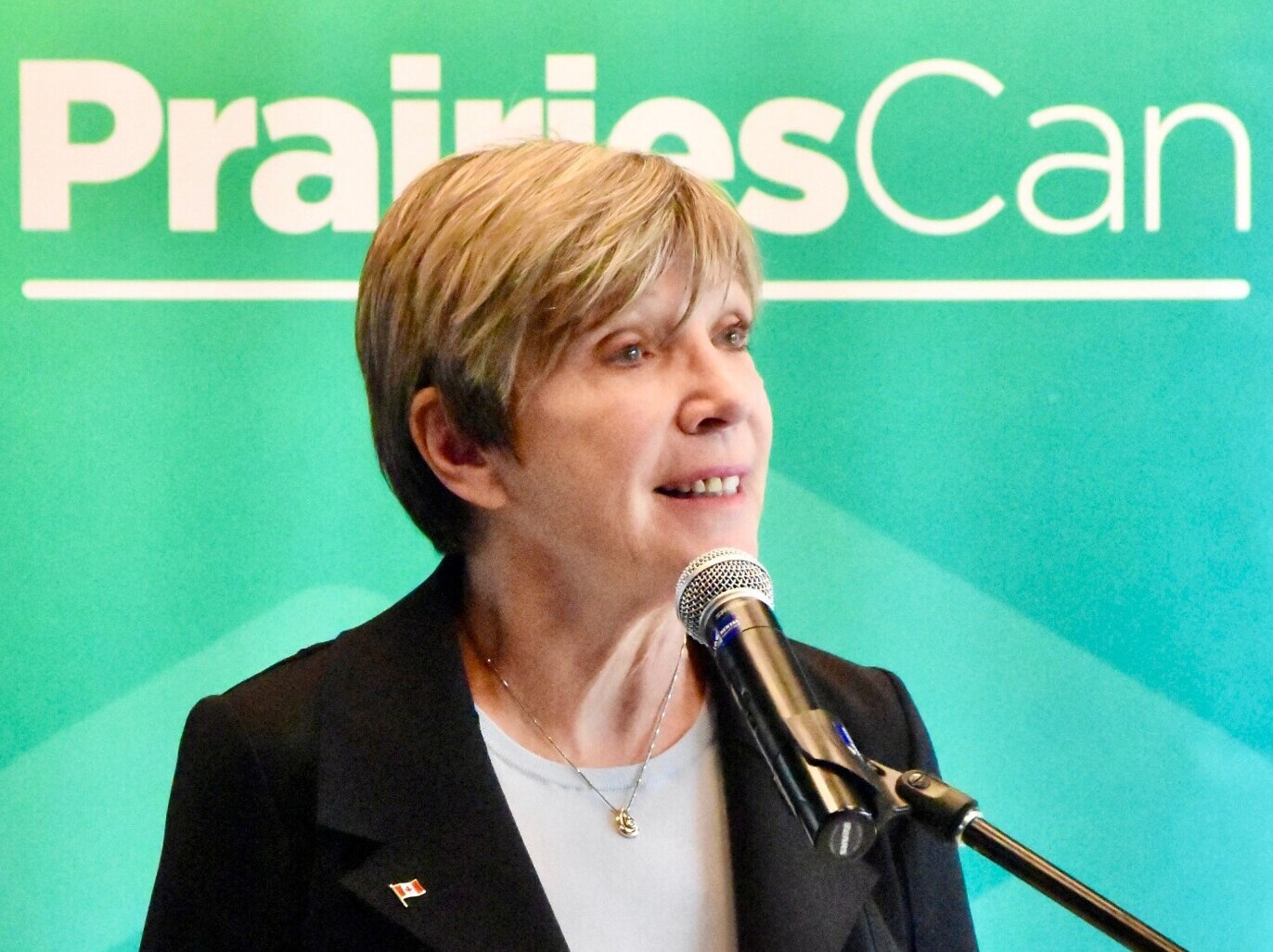
- Olszewksi speaking at PrairiesCan in 2025.

Minister of Emergency Management and Community Resilience
- Incumbent
- Assumed office May 13, 2025
- Prime Minister: Mark Carney
- Preceded by: David McGuinty

Minister responsible for Prairies Economic Development Canada
- Incumbent
- Assumed office May 13, 2025
- Prime Minister: Mark Carney
- Preceded by: Terry Duguid

Member of Parliament for Edmonton Centre
- Incumbent
- Assumed office April 28, 2025
- Preceded by: Randy Boissonnault

Personal details
- Born: Eleanor Angela Olszewski; 1954 or 1955 (age 71–72)
- Party: Liberal
- Education: University of Alberta (B.Sc., L.L.B.)
- Website: eleanorolszewski.libparl.ca

Eleanor Angela Olszewski (born 1954 or 1955) is a Canadian lawyer and politician who has been Minister of Emergency Management and Community Resilience and Minister responsible for Prairies Economic Development Canada since 2025. A member of the Liberal Party of Canada, she was elected to the House of Commons in the 2025 federal election and serves as the member of Parliament (MP) for Edmonton Centre.

== Early life and education ==
Eleanor Angela Olszewski was raised in Medicine Hat, Canada. She graduated from the University of Alberta with a Bachelor of Science degree in pharmacy and a Juris Doctor.

== Legal career ==
Olszewski was admitted to the bar of Alberta in 1982, and worked as a civil litigator in Edmonton. She became a partner of Brownlee Fryett, which was founded by John Edward Brownlee, in 1992. Albertan Minister of Justice Ron Stevens appointed her and 102 other people as a Queen's Counsel on 31 December 2007. She was an adjunct professor at the University of Alberta.

== Political career ==
In the 2015 and 2019 elections Olszewski was an unsuccessful Liberal candidate in the riding Edmonton Strathcona. In the 2025 election she was elected from the riding of Edmonton Centre, being the only Liberal to win in the Edmonton area. She was initially slated to run in Edmonton Strathcona again, but was moved to Edmonton Centre after Randy Boissonnault declined to run for reelection.

On 13 May 2025, Olszewski became the Minister of Emergency Management and Community Resilience and Prairies Economic Development Canada. She is the only Albertan in the cabinet of Mark Carney.

At the time of the 2025 Canadian federal election, she lived in Edmonton.

== Political positions ==
Olszewski is opposed to Alberta separatism. As minister she promoted federal investments in rural and Indigenous economic development in Alberta.

== Electoral record ==
2025 Canadian federal election: Edmonton Centre
Party	Candidate	Votes	%	±%	Expenditures
Liberal	Eleanor Olszewski	24,138	44.35	+13.14	$114,486.94
Conservative	Sayid Ahmed	20,626	37.90	+5.30	$122,742.76
New Democratic	Trisha Estabrooks	8,440	15.51	–14.90	$111,907.33
People's	John Ross	468	0.86	–4.00	$1,148.80
Christian Heritage	David John Bohonos	158	0.29	–	$1,052.75
Independent	Gregory Bell	155	0.28	–	none listed
Independent	Mike Dutcher	137	0.25	–	none listed
Communist	Naomi Rankin	133	0.24	+0.20	none listed
Independent	Ronald S. Billingsley Jr.	106	0.19	–	$68,236.41
Marxist–Leninist	Merryn Edwards de la O	67	0.12	–0.14	none listed
Total valid votes/expense limit		54,428	99.13	–	$131,456.25
Total rejected ballots		479	0.87	+0.18	
Turnout		54,907	63.06	+0.57	
Eligible voters		87,067			
Liberal notional gain from Conservative		Swing		+3.84	
Source: Elections Canada

2019 Canadian federal election: Edmonton Strathcona
Party	Candidate	Votes	%	±%	Expenditures
New Democratic	Heather McPherson	26,823	47.27	+3.31	$93,513.73
Conservative	Sam Lilly	21,035	37.07	+5.79	$88,211.43
Liberal	Eleanor Olszewski	6,592	11.62	–9.11	$90,837.85
Green	Michael Kalmanovitch	1,152	2.03	–0.27	$8,919.41
People's	Ian Cameron	941	1.66	–	$1,364.69
Communist	Naomi Rankin	125	0.22	–	$496.07
Marxist–Leninist	Dougal MacDonald	77	0.14	–0.03	none listed
Total valid votes/expense limit		56,745	99.56	–	$106,353.94
Total rejected ballots		250	0.44	+0.05	
Turnout		56,995	72.26	+1.27	
Eligible voters		78,876			
New Democratic hold		Swing		+4.55	
Source: Elections Canada

2015 Canadian federal election: Edmonton Strathcona
Party	Candidate	Votes	%	±%	Expenditures
New Democratic	Linda Duncan	24,446	43.96	–9.75	$87,241.42
Conservative	Len Thom	17,395	31.28	–9.04	$36,812.49
Liberal	Eleanor Olszewski	11,524	20.73	+17.87	$62,711.39
Green	Jacob K. Binnema	1,278	2.30	–0.04	$1,924.74
Libertarian	Malcolm Stinson	311	0.56	–	$1,599.80
Pirate	Ryan Bromsgrove	201	0.36	–	$1,083.76
Rhinoceros	Donovan Eckstrom	133	0.24	–	none listed
Independent	Chris Jones	116	0.21	–	none listed
Independent	Andrew Schurman	107	0.19	–	$455.26
Marxist–Leninist	Dougal MacDonald	93	0.17	–0.02	none listed
Total valid votes/expense limit		55,604	99.61	–	$208,715.39
Total rejected ballots		217	0.39	–	
Turnout		55,821	70.99	–	
Eligible voters		78,635			
New Democratic hold		Swing		–0.35	
Source: Elections Canada

== Works cited ==
=== News ===
- Sandor, Steven (20 May 2025). "'Great sense of responsibility': Edmonton's Olszewski goes from political abyss to Carney's cabinet". Edmonton Journal. Archived from the original on 20 June 2025.
- Lachacz, Adam (14 October 2019). "Federal Election 2019 Meet the Candidates: Liberal Eleanor Olszewski". The Gateway. Archived from the original on 20 June 2025.

=== Newspapers ===
- "Brownlee Fryett". Edmonton Journal. 11 July 1992. p. D2 – via Newspapers.com.
- "Lawyers add QC to title". Edmonton Journal. 4 January 2008. p. D3 – via Newspapers.com.

=== Web ===
- "Eleanor Olszewski". Liberal Party of Canada. Archived from the original on 19 February 2015.
- "Roles - Hon. Eleanor Olszewski". House of Commons of Canada. Archived from the original on 20 June 2025.
- "The Committee of the Privy Council, on the recommendation of the Prime Minister, advises that". Canada. 13 May 2025. Archived from the original on 20 June 2025.

Order of precedence
Preceded by Marjorie Michel as Member of the Cabinet	Order of Precedence of Canada as Member of the Cabinet	Succeeded by Gregor Robertson as Member of the Cabinet
