= AgustaWestland CH-149 Cormorant =

Search-and-rescue helicopter

CH-149 Cormorant
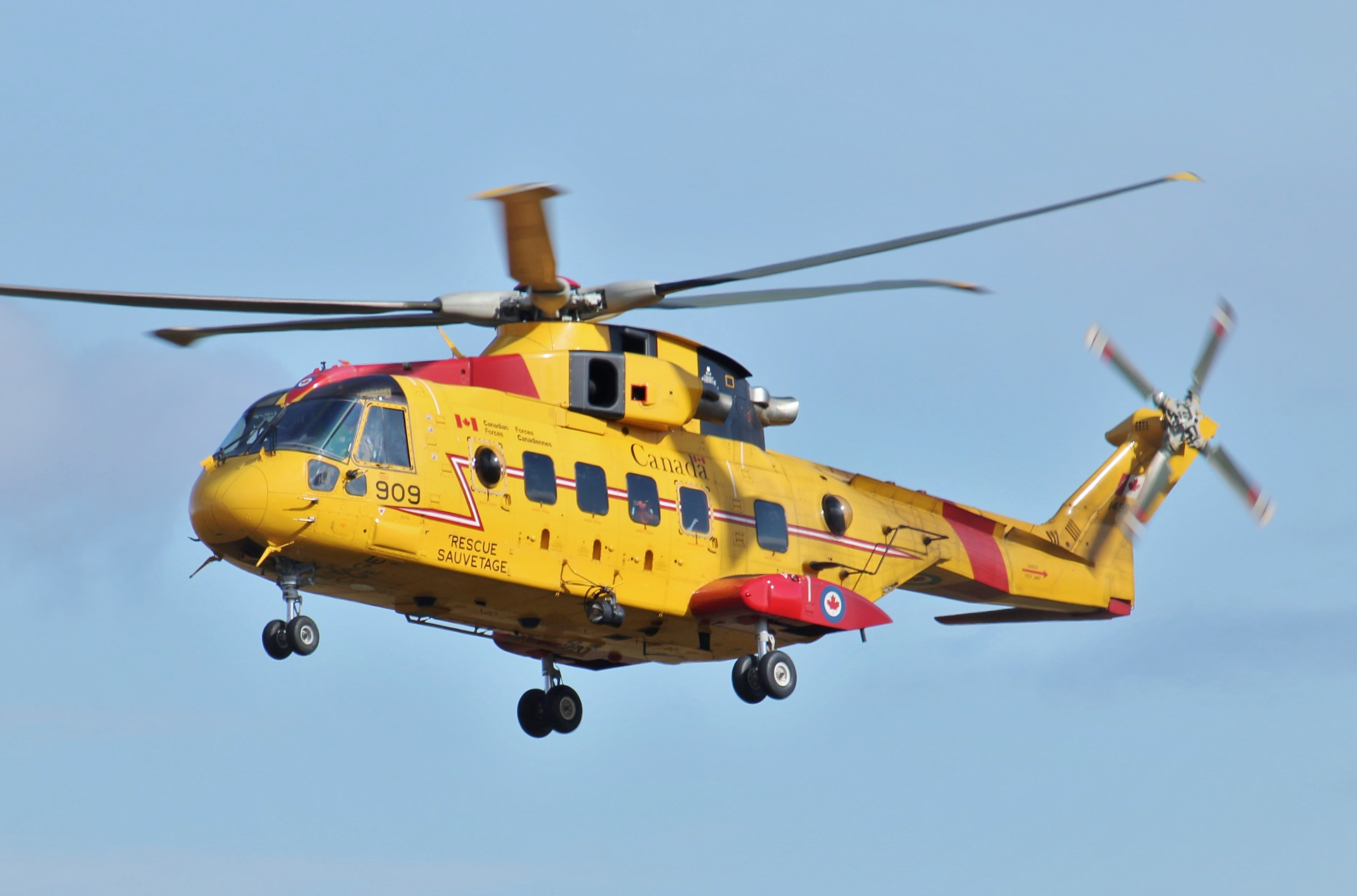
- A Royal Canadian Air Force CH-149 Cormorant flying near Canadian Forces Base Greenwood, Nova Scotia, Canada

General information
- Type: Medium SAR utility helicopter
- Manufacturer: AgustaWestland
- Status: Active service
- Primary user: Royal Canadian Air Force
- Number built: 15

History
- Manufactured: 1990s–present
- Introduction date: 2000
- First flight: 31 May 2000
- Developed from: AgustaWestland AW101

The AgustaWestland CH-149 Cormorant is the air-sea rescue variant of the AgustaWestland AW101 (formerly EH101) helicopter for the Canadian Armed Forces. Developed by AgustaWestland in Italy (now merged as part of Leonardo), the CH-149 is a medium-lift helicopter for military applications.

== Design and development ==
In 1977, the British Ministry of Defence issued a requirement for an anti-submarine warfare (ASW) helicopter to replace the Royal Navy's Westland Sea Kings. Westland responded with design WG.34 that was approved for development. Meanwhile, the Marina Militare (Italian Navy) was also seeking a replacement for its Agusta-built Sea Kings, leading Agusta to discussions with Westland about the possibility of a joint development. This culminated in the joint venture being finalised in November 1979 and a new company called EH Industries was formed to manage the project the following year - EH being an abbreviation for Elicottero Helicopter, the Italian and English words for "helicopter." As the design studies progressed, EH became aware of a broader market for an aircraft with the same capabilities required by the British and Italian navies, leading to a more generalised design that could be customised. After a lengthy development, the first prototype flew on October 9, 1987.

Following the lead of the UK and Italy, the Canadian government placed a C$4.4 billion order in 1987 for 48 (later 42) EH101s to replace the Canadian Forces's Sikorsky CH-124 Sea Kings and Boeing Vertol CH-113 Labradors. These were to be assembled in Canada under the designations CH-148 Petrel (33 originally, reduced to 28) and CH-149 Chimo (15) in the anti-submarine warfare and air-sea rescue roles respectively. The replacement programme was cancelled, however, after a change of government in 1993, leading to the payment of $157.8 million in cancellation penalties.

In 1998, the Canadian government announced that the CH-113s would now be replaced by a new scaled down search-and-rescue variant of the EH101, carrying the designation CH-149 Cormorant. Unlike the Petrel/Chimo contract, these 15 aircraft were to be built entirely in Europe. The first two aircraft arrived in Canada in September 2001 and entered service the following year.

When it became obvious that the Sea Kings were in need of immediate replacement, the EH101 was again part of a Canadian competition (Maritime Helicopter Project), against a variant of the Sikorsky H-92, for a total price tag of C$5 billion. The Sikorsky entry won the competition on July 23, 2004, with the first six delivered June 2015.

== Operational history ==
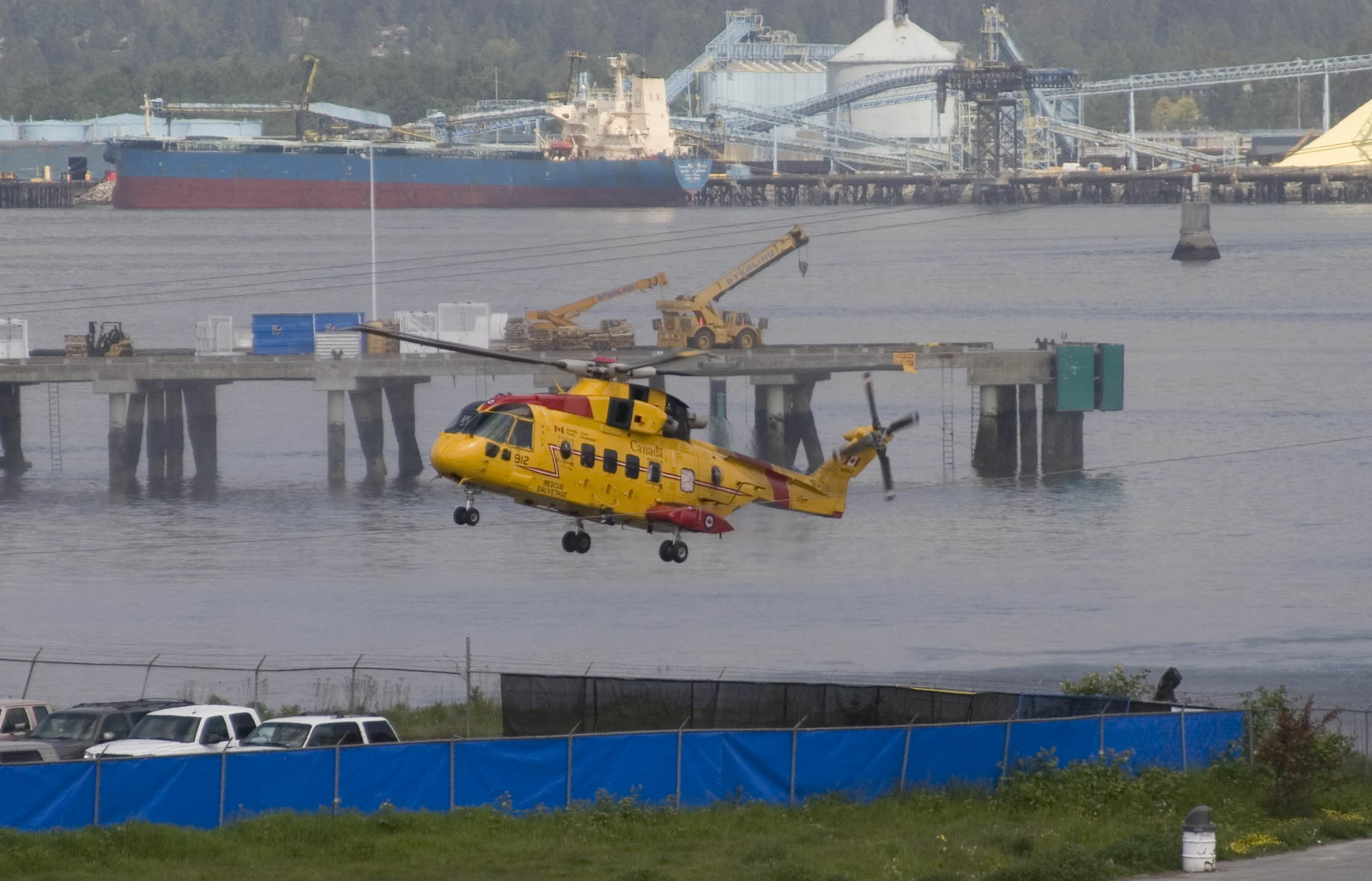
A CH-149 Cormorant lands in Vancouver

The first operational CH-149 flight occurred in 2002 when a Cormorant of 442 Squadron performed a medical evacuation from a merchant ship 200 km (110 nmi) offshore in Hecate Strait. An even more dramatic demonstration of Cormorant capabilities occurred in January 2003 when a 103 Squadron CH-149 successfully flew a 1,200 km round-trip rescue mission to the Finnish ro-ro cargo ship MS Camilla off Newfoundland. Two refuelling stops at the Hibernia oil platform were required. This rescue became the subject of an installment of the 2007 National Geographic Channel documentary series Trapped.

On October 25, 2006, a search and rescue crew from 442 Squadron in Comox, British Columbia, conducted a rescue from the side of a cliff in a box canyon with the CH-149 Cormorant which Canadian Forces Captain Sean Morris described as "pretty much the worst situation I've been in my entire life." Captain Morris and his colleagues received international recognition for the rescue as the first Canadian winner of the Prince Philip Helicopter Rescue Award issued by the Guild of Air Pilots and Air Navigators in the UK

In August 2010, the Canadian Forces fleet of 14 CH-149 Cormorants passed 40,000 operational hours. The fleet had a higher flying rate than any other AW101 fleet and Cormorant 901, currently stationed at Canadian Forces Base Comox with 442 Squadron, has the highest number of airframe hours on any of the AW101s anywhere in the world. The worldwide fleet of 190 AW101 helicopters had achieved in excess of 200,000 flight hours in Canada, UK, Italy, Denmark, Portugal, and Japan.

In June 2011, 9 former USN & USMC VH-71s, which are also based on the AW101, were purchased by Canada to be used as spare parts for the CH-149 fleet. In 2013, Canada was reportedly studying whether up to four of the VH-71s could be certified for operational use.

In 2017, the Liberal government announced funding for the mid-life upgrade of the fleet, to be led by 'Team Cormorant', a team composed of Leonardo Helicopters, IMP Aerospace and Defense, CAE, GE Canada and Collins Aerospace. Estimated at around C$1.5bn, the programmes would offer a common fleet featuring latest avionic and mission systems, advanced radars and sensors, vision enhancement and tracking systems as well as a new 3,000-horsepower (2,200 kW) GE CT7-8E engine. On May 10, 2017, a report by the Senate Standing Committee on National Security and Defence recommended the government move forward with a proposal to expand the Cormorant fleet by upgrading the 14 CH-149 aircraft and converting 7 VH-71 airframes currently in storage to the same operational capability. This would expand the Cormorant fleet to 21 aircraft, and keep them operational until 2040. This recommendation was not adopted by the Liberal Government and instead, in August 2019, the Government announced that "at least" two additional Cormorant helicopters would be purchased while the other 14 would be modernized. Ostensibly this might have permitted some Cormorant helicopters to be based at CFB Trenton in central Canada, in addition to other bases on the East and West coasts. However, by 2021 it was reported that the entire acquisition had been put on hold, at least temporarily, as being "unaffordable".

In December 2022, the C$1.2 billion mid-life fleet upgrade was awarded to Leonardo U.K. Ltd. This contract will upgrade the existing fleet to the Model 612 standard. Additionally, the contract will add three new aircraft to the fleet, by using predominantly new and some used parts from the VH-71 and current CH-149 fleets which includes transmissions, landing gears and control surfaces. A second, C$78 million contract with CAE Inc. was also announced for a domestic flight simulator to "address[...] the need for an improved training solution."

The first flight of a modernized helicopter took place on June 30, 2026.

== Operators ==
Canada

- Royal Canadian Air Force - 13 as of January 2025
  - 103 Search and Rescue Squadron
  - 413 Transport and Rescue Squadron
  - 442 Transport and Rescue Squadron

== Incidents and accidents ==
- Upon its entry to service, the AW101 experienced tail rotor hub cracking issues; including one British Merlin crashing on 30 March 2004 which was caused by this issue. The CH-149 Cormorant was grounded and has placed on limited flight status multiple times due to hub cracks; all 15 aircraft in Canadian inventory showed cracks of varying degrees shortly after entry to service in 2004. A subsequent redesign was issued in 2005; out of the six aircraft which had the new hubs installed, three showed cracking one month later. A new Articulated Tail Rotor (ATR) with elastomeric bearings has been adopted on the AW101, based on a proven design used on the AW139 medium-twin helicopter. The ATR is now standard issue on new AW101s and is offered for retrofit on existing fleets.
- On 13 July 2006, a CH-149 of 413 Transport and Rescue Squadron crashed into the waters of Chedabucto Bay off the coast of Canso, Nova Scotia while flying in heavy fog during a search and rescue exercise with a Canadian Coast Guard Auxiliary vessel. Three Canadian Forces personnel were killed and four others were injured. Mechanical failure was formally ruled out as the cause of the crash. On 11 March 2008, the Directorate of Flight Safety for the Canadian Forces announced that pilot error was the cause, and that Canadian Forces officials were aware of a lack of training received by pilots. Preliminary reports indicate that pilots were unaware of the proper use of the autopilot, leading to a controlled flight into terrain.
- Cormorant CH149903 (Call sign OUTCAST 903) crashed on March 10, 2022 during a training exercise at 9 Wing in Gander, Newfoundland. A seat malfunction caused the loss of outside visual references in combination with severe vertical vibration resulted in an unrecognized spatial disorientation of the pilot flying. The right outboard wheel, the right horizontal stabilizer, and the main rotor blades impacted the runway near simultaneously. The aircraft was destroyed. Four of the six occupants sustained minor injuries while two occupants sustained serious injuries. The aircraft has been salvaged for spare parts to be used in the mid-life upgrade of the fleet.

== Specifications (CH-149) ==
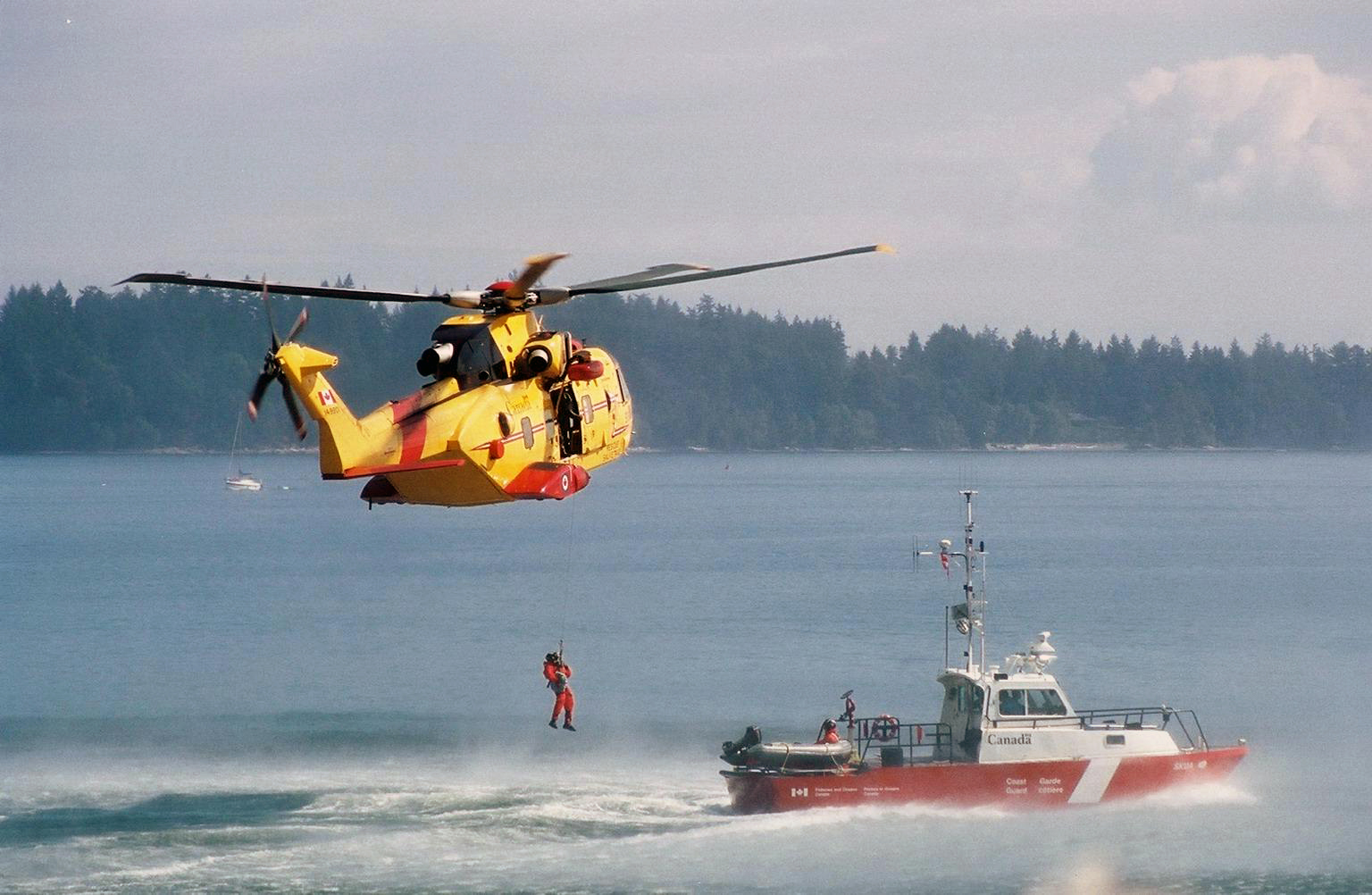
A Royal Canadian Air Force CH-149 Cormorant exercising with a Canadian Coast Guard vessel

General characteristics

- Crew: 5 (aircraft commander, first officer, flight engineer, 2 SAR technicians)
- Capacity:
  - 15 seated troops; or
  - 20 standing troops; or
  - 2 stretchers with medics
- Length: 22.81 m (74 ft 10 in)
- Height: 6.65 m (21 ft 10 in)
- Empty weight: 10,500 kg (23,149 lb)
- Max takeoff weight: 14,600 kg (32,187 lb)
- Powerplant: 3 × General Electric T700/T6A1 turboshaft, 1,600 kW (2,100 hp) each
- Main rotor diameter: 18.59 m (61 ft 0 in)
- Main rotor area: 278.0 m^{2} (2,992 sq ft)

Performance

- Never exceed speed: 280 km/h (170 mph, 150 kn)
- Range: 1,389 km (863 mi, 750 nmi)
- Service ceiling: 3,000 m (10,000 ft)
- Rate of climb: 10.2 m/s (2,010 ft/min)
- Wing loading: 53.8 kg/m^{2} (11.0 lb/sq ft)
- Power/mass: 0.459 kW/kg (0.279 shp/lb)

== See also ==
Related development

- AgustaWestland AW101
- VH-71 Kestrel
- Bell CH-146 Griffon
- Boeing Vertol CH-113 Labrador

Aircraft of comparable role, configuration, and era

- NHI NH90
- Sikorsky S-92 / Sikorsky CH-148 Cyclone

Related lists

- List of helicopters
- List of active Canadian military aircraft
