= 103 Search and Rescue Squadron =

- Squadron badge
- Active: 1947–1968; 1977–present
- Country: Canada
- Branch: (Canada) Royal Canadian Air Force
- Type: Search and rescue
- Part of: 9 Wing Gander
- Mottos: Seek and save
- Website: www.canada.ca/en/air-force/corporate/squadrons/103-squadron.html

Commanders
- Commander: Major Matt Neri

Aircraft flown
- Patrol: Canso-A, Avro Lancaster, Douglas Dakota, Noorduyn Norseman, Sikorsky H-5
- Transport: CH-113 Labrador, AgustaWestland CH-149 Cormorant

103 Search and Rescue Squadron of the Royal Canadian Air Force is a search and rescue unit based at 9 Wing Gander on the Canadian island of Newfoundland. The squadron is responsible for a large area covering the offshore waters of Canada's Exclusive Economic Zone in the Atlantic Ocean and inland areas in the Maritimes, Newfoundland and Labrador, and parts of Eastern Quebec. The squadron operates three AgustaWestland CH-149 Cormorant helicopters.

== History ==
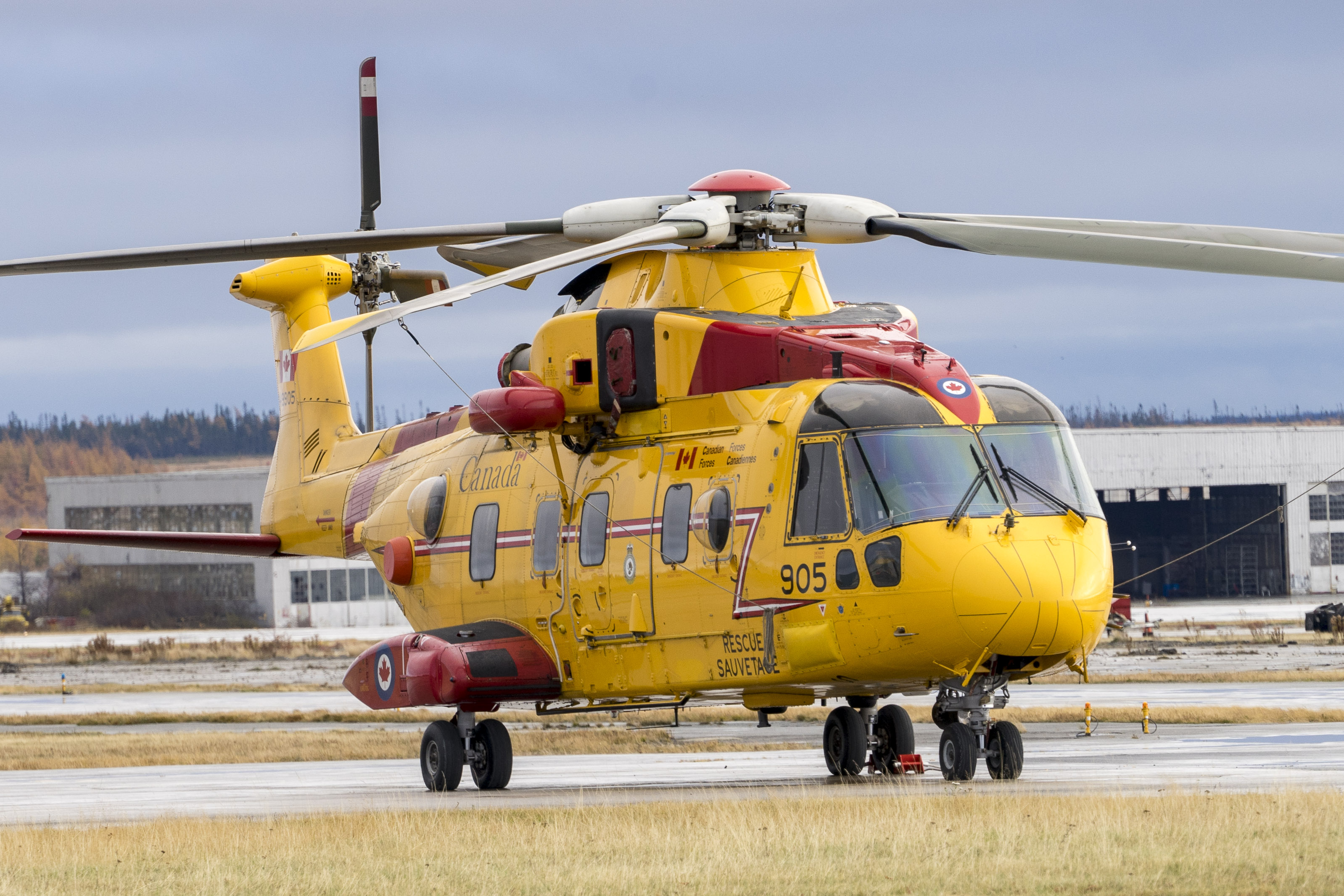
CH-149 Cormorant stationed at 9 Wing in Gander, Newfoundland.

The unit was stood up on April 1, 1947, at RCAF Station Dartmouth as the 103 Search and Rescue Flight, a section of 101KU. Later that year, the unit moved to RCAF Station Greenwood. In 1950, the unit was renamed 103 Rescue Unit The unit was located in Greenwood NS until 1968 when it was moved to RCAF Station Summerside, where it remained until unification of the Canadian Forces in 1968, when it was disbanded, with the remnants of the unit forming the new 413 Transport and Rescue Squadron at CFB Summerside. As 103 RU it flew a variety of aircraft: Canso-A (until 1962), Avro Lancaster (until 1965), Douglas Dakota (until 1968), Noorduyn Norseman (until 1957), Sikorsky H-5 (until 1965). 103 also had detachments in Torbay, Newfoundland (which was then RCAF Station Torbay re-opened in 1953 on the former RCAF Aerodrome – Torbay, Newfoundland) and Goose Bay, with the latter closed and becoming 107 Rescue Unit in 1954. RCN provided high-speed launch vessels (ex-RCMP) support at select locations.

The unit was re-activated in 1977 at CFB Gander to meet the search and rescue demands in Canada's area of responsibility in the western North Atlantic. At the time of its reactivation, the squadron was equipped with the Boeing Vertol CH-113 Labrador twin-rotor helicopter and was stationed in a permanent hangar constructed on the grounds of the airport in 1977. In 1997 the squadron was re-designated to its current name by Prince Philip, Duke of Edinburgh, and presented with its standard.

In 2009, the squadron, alongside its parent unit 9 Wing Gander, hosted SAREX 09, an annual search and rescue exercise involving SAR organizations across Canada, with units from the United States Air Force and international observers also attending.
