= Haietlik =

Canadian legendary creature

The haietlik (Nuuchahnulth: ḥiʔiiƛ̓iik; "lightning serpent") is a lightning spirit and legendary creature in the mythology of the Nuu-chah-nulth (Nootka) people of the Canadian Pacific Northwest Coast. According to legend, the haietlik is both an ally and a weapon of the thunderbirds, employed by them in the hunting of whales. They are described as huge serpents with heads as sharp as a knife and tongues that shoot lightning bolts. A blow from a haietlik injures a whale enough that the hunting thunderbird can carry it away as prey. The haietlik is variously described as dwelling among the feathers of the thunderbirds to be unleashed with a flap of the wings, or inhabiting the inland coastal waters and lakes frequented by the Nuu-chah-nulth people.

== Cultural significance ==
Because thunderbirds are said to use the haietlik essentially as harpoons, the lightning serpent is commonly associated with whaling in Nuu-chah-nulth culture. Whalers who carry the skin of this mythological creature in their canoe are said to have luck in whaling. British sailors visiting the Pacific Northwest in 1791 reportedly saw representations of the haietlik painted on the sides of canoes. Images of the haietlik also appear in petroglyphs on the coast of British Columbia and as decorations on whaling harpoons.

The haietlik also serves a ceremonial purpose in Nuu-chah-nulth rituals. One part of the ceremony for a marriage between a chief's daughter and the son of another tribe involves men of the groom's tribe arriving in a haietlik formation – their canoes formed up in a line, moving in a zig-zag pattern around the cove – before landing and distributing blankets as gifts to every member of the bride's tribe. Another marriage ceremony involves dancers in haietlik masks entering the house of the bride's family. The Nuu-chah-nulth wolf ritual – an initiation ceremony in which initiates are performatively kidnapped by men in wolf masks, taken into the woods, and taught important dances – also references the haietlik. One of the masks used in this ceremony simultaneously represents both a wolf and a lightning serpent, and one of the dances taught to the initiates is a thunder dance in which a haietlik-dancer (hinkiic) enters a house through the roof.

The Canadian Forces' 442 Transport and Rescue Squadron badge features a red haietlik in a Northwest Coast art style.
