= Canadian Sea King replacement =

Military procurement process (1983–2018)

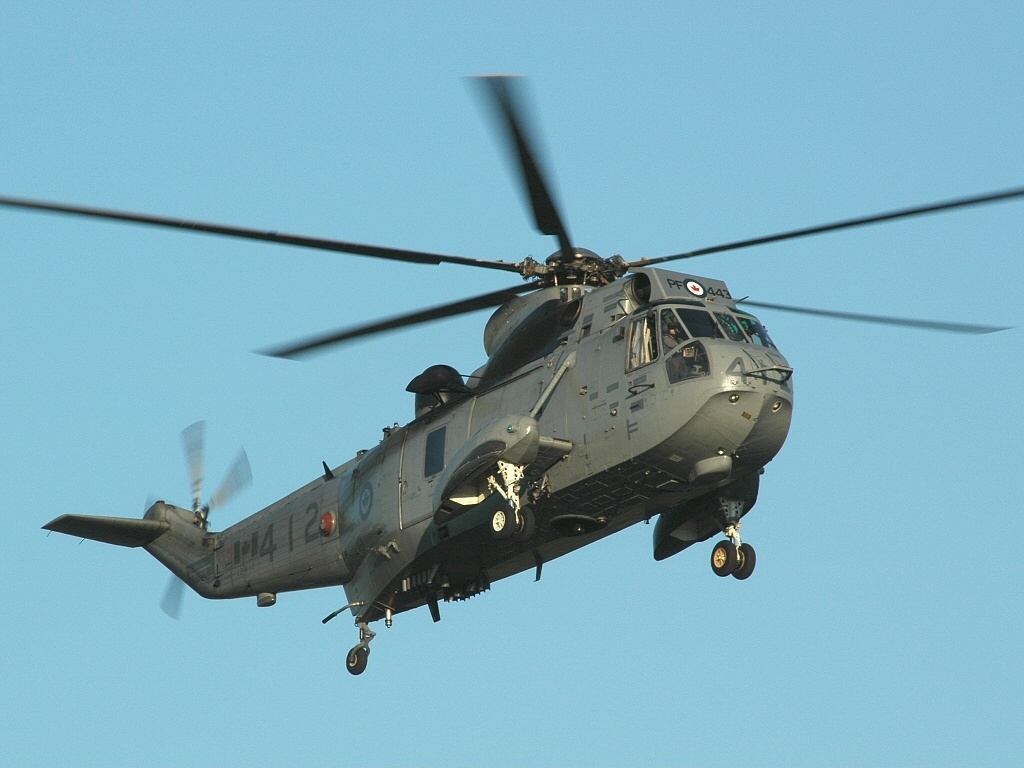
A Sikorsky CH-124 Sea King

From 1983 onwards, a replacement was sought for the aging Canadian Armed Forces Sikorsky CH-124 Sea King helicopters. Due to fiscal and political issues, the process was repeatedly delayed. In 1987, 35 EH101s were on order, but these were cancelled for budget reasons in 1993. The CH-148 Cyclone, a variant of the Sikorsky H-92 Superhawk, was selected in 2004, with deliveries delayed until 2015. The last CH-124s were retired in 2018.

== Background and EH101 ==
In 1983, the Department of National Defence (DND) began issuing contracts for the Sea King Replacement Project; these were not intended to replace the CH-124, then reaching its 20th year with the Canadian Forces (CF), but instead was for develop new avionics for an unknown future replacement helicopter. By the mid-1980s, the CF started to regard the CH-124 as too small for anti-submarine warfare (ASW) due to the ever-increasing size and amount of ASW gear required. In 1985, the New Shipboard Aircraft Project (NSA) was started by the Progressive Conservative government led by Brian Mulroney to replace the Sea King.

In 1986, the NSA entered its project definition phase; solicitations of interest from industry were requested in April. Three contenders were singled out: Sikorsky's S-70 SeaHawk (designated SH-60 Seahawk by the US Navy), Aérospatiale's AS332F Super Puma, and AgustaWestland's new EH101, the latter had been purpose-designed to replace the Sea King. In a surprise move, Sikorsky withdrew from the contest as the SeaHawk was seen by the CF as too small; furthermore, Sikorsky was competing with its own interests, having bought part of Westland Helicopters, which was offering the EH101. Aérospatiale suddenly redubbed the AS332F as the AS532 Cougar. Some claimed that rebranding a formerly successful product was a sign of desperation as sales slowed.

In 1987, the Mulroney government opted for 35 EH101s. As the CF's CH-113 Labrador search-and-rescue helicopters also needed replacing, the NSA and the New SAR Helicopter Project were merged in 1991. Economic benefits were a lower price per aircraft and for spares, as well as easing maintenance and training; the total cost rose to CA$5.8 billion for 50 helicopters (comprising 35 ASW Sea King replacements and 15 SAR types, dubbed CH-148 Petrel and CH-149 Chimo respectively). Amid a rising deficit and growing unemployment, some argued that Canada was in a poor position to spend billions of dollars. In 1993, the Progressive Conservatives' new leader, Kim Campbell, announced a cut to 28 Petrels and 15 Chimos, lowering the cost to CA$4.4 billion. Tory credibility lowered when Campbell said that ASW capabilities may be vital if submarines ran the blockade of Haiti, as the notion was viewed as absurd.

== Political delays ==
Liberal leader Jean Chrétien, as the leader of the Opposition, disparagingly called the EH101 a "Cadillac" in a time of fiscal restraint. Cancelling it was a key point in the party's platform for the federal election. After a change of government in October 1993, the incoming Liberal Party cancelled the NSA, incurring CA$500 million of cancellation fees. This left few options as a CH-124 replacement was still needed but no alternative or contingency plan existed. By not buying the EH101 and slashing the DND's budget, the government aimed to cut the deficit and be more fiscally responsible. Some commentators stated that aborting the NSA was fiscally irresponsible. In a debate, Chrétien said that the president of the United States still flew in a Sea King, thus it was good enough for Canada.

In the 1990s, each CH-124 needed over 30 man-hours of maintenance for every flying hour, which the Canadian Naval Officers Association called 'grossly disproportionate'. They were also unavailable for operations 40% of the time and, being typically 10–15 years older than most operators' fleets, AIRCOM often needed custom-made spare parts as Sikorsky's supplies were either too costly or unavailable. Observers saw the CH-124 as unreliable, outdated and costly to maintain. On 27 February 2003, a Sea King crashed back onto HMCS Iroquois's flight deck shortly after takeoff; images were widely circulated. That same year, the fleet was temporarily grounded (except for essential operations) after two Sea Kings coincidentally lost power within days of each other.

As replacements were clearly needed, the Liberal government began the Maritime Helicopter Project (MHP). Its terms were repeatedly changed and were accused of being deliberately shaped to bar the EH101. The MHP was divided into two sections, with distinct airframe and integrated mission systems components. The two-part approach was attacked by all sides; opponents stated that separating major components only raised total costs. Public Works insistence on "lowest-cost compliant" bids failed to help the situation. In December 2002, the new minister of National Defence, John McCallum, reversed course, opting for a single contract rather than two. Yet, this move was criticized by many figures who had attacked the two-part process as it forced the MHP to restart.

Despite several high-profile Sea King losses, little progress occurred until Chrétien retired in December 2003; the new prime minister, Paul Martin, made replacing the CH-124 a top priority, exempting it from a spending freeze on all major DND projects. On 17 December 2003, tenders were issued. MHP candidates were Sikorsky's S-92 Superhawk, NHIndustries NH90, and the EH101. The DND ruled that the NH90 did not comply with requirements and thus was eliminated, despite rumours that it had all but won the contest months before. The apparent reversal of favour may have been political, as previously Canada had been seeking warmer industrial relations with France. Other factors indicated valid reasons to reject the NH90, such as size, a key criteria from the outset.

== H-92 selection ==
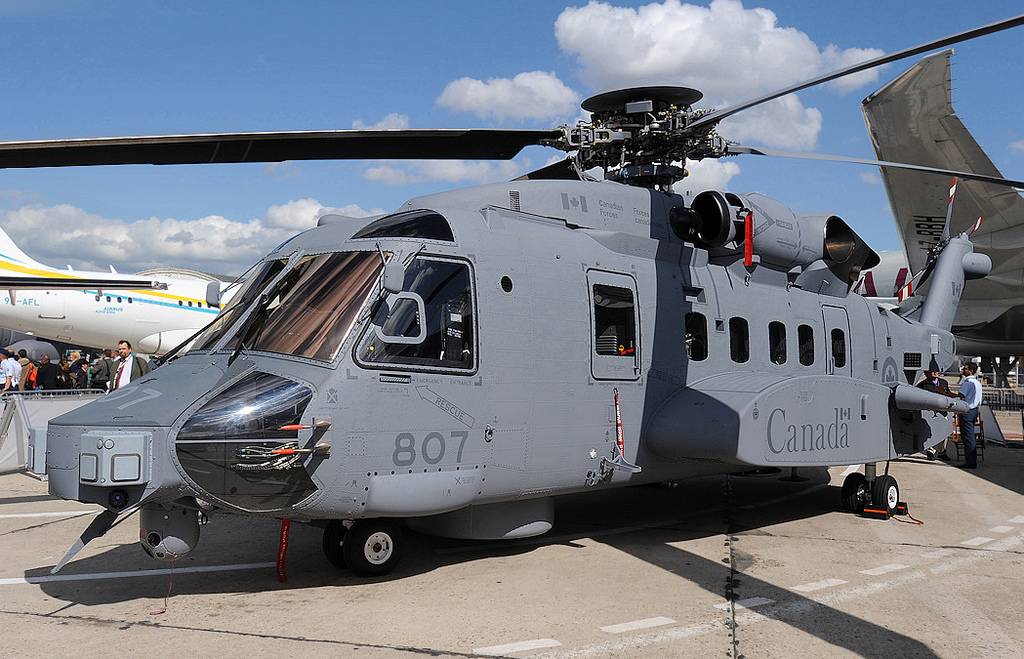
The CH-148 Cyclone

In July 2004, it was announced that 28 Sikorsky CH-148 Cyclones, carrying a General Dynamics mission package, would replace the Sea King; the first CH-148 was scheduled for delivery in 2008. Problems at Sikorsky delayed deliveries until 2010, In 2013, only four interim training aircraft were delivered, not full-spec aircraft. Sikorsky disputed claims that the four interim CH-148s were unsuitable for testing.

In September 2013, the Canadian government stated it was re-evaluating the CH-148, and would consider cancelling it in favour of other helicopters if that were the better option. By that point, Sikorsky had accrued over $88 million in late damages and needed a 43-month reprieve on deliveries since 2008. In January 2014, the government announced it would proceed with the CH-148 and retire the Sea King in 2015; Sikorsky agreed to deliver the CH-148s at no additional cost to the government.
