= Tactical coordinator =

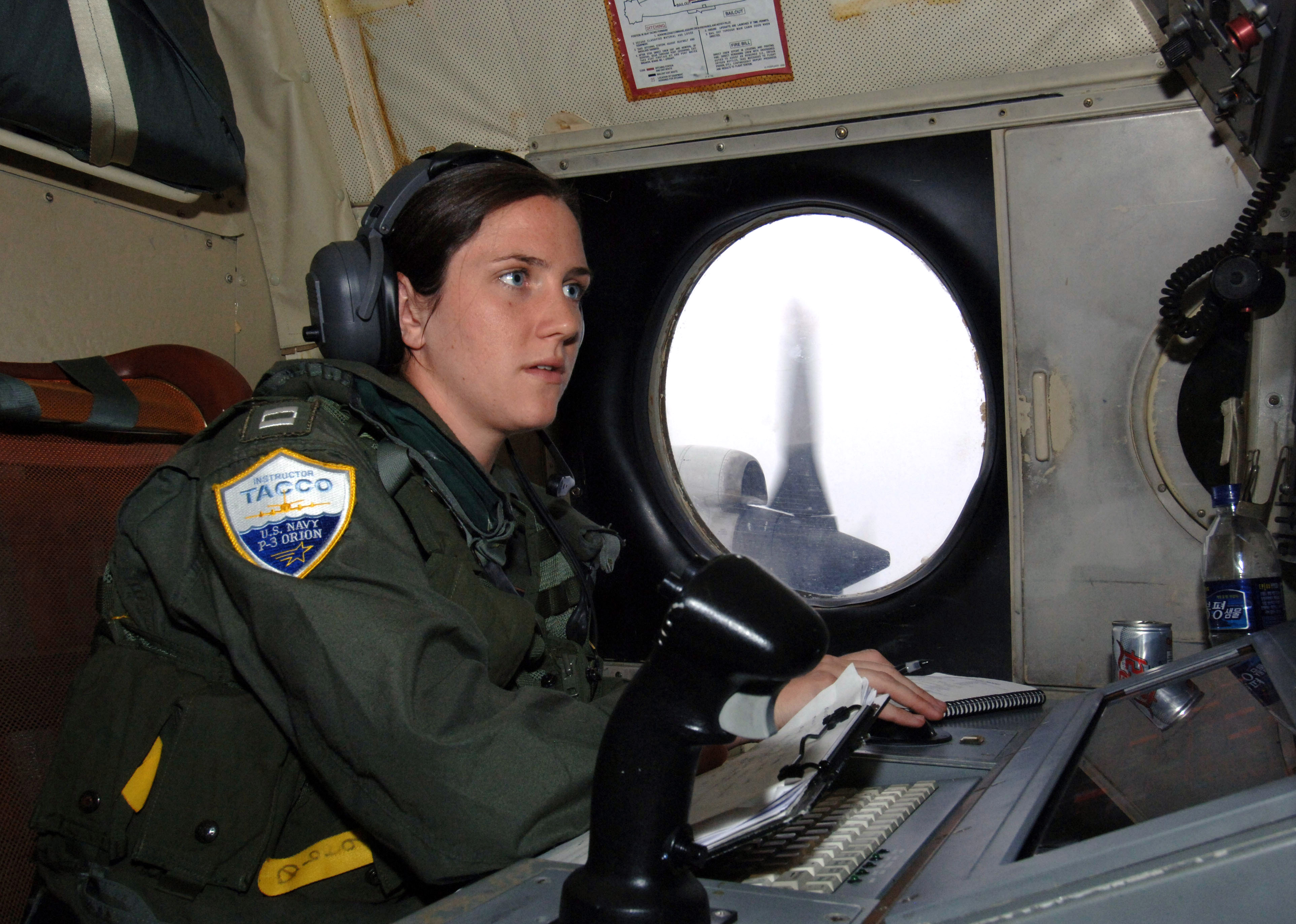
A tactical coordinator on board a P-3C

A Tactical Coordinator (Tacco, pronounced 'TACK-oh') is the aircrew member responsible for coordinating the activities of the part of the crew responsible for the tactical operation of the aircraft and its systems. The TACCO may, depending on the country, be the Mission Commander of the crew. Typically, TACCOs run the missions in Sikorsky CH-124 Sea King helicopters, Sikorsky CH-148 Cyclone helicopters, Lockheed P-3 Orion and Boeing P-8 Poseidon patrol aircraft and Lockheed S-3 Viking aircraft. They are specially trained for antisubmarine warfare tactics, but also participate in other missions in which these aircraft are involved.

TACCOs not only operate anti submarine warfare abilities but may also assist in controlling major operational fields and areas of conflict.
