= 442 Transport and Rescue Squadron =

Canadian military flying unit

- 442^{e} Escadron de transport et de sauvetage
- Squadron badge featuring a haietlik
- Active: 1944–1945, 1946–1964, 1968–present
- Country: Canada
- Branch: Royal Canadian Air Force
- Type: Tactical transport, search and rescue
- Part of: 19 Wing Comox
- Mottos: Un Dieu, une reine, un cœur (French for 'One God, one queen, one heart')
- Battle honours: Fortress Europe, 1944; France and Germany, 1944–1945; Normandy, 1944; Arnhem; Rhine; Aleutians, 1943
- Website: canada.ca/en/air-force/corporate/squadrons/442-squadron.html

Commanders
- Commander: Lieutenant-Colonel Claude Rivard

Aircraft flown
- Transport: Past - Grumman HU-16 Albatross, C-47 Skytrain, CC-115 Buffalo, CH-113 Labrador. Current - Lockheed CC-130 Hercules, CC-295 Kingfisher and AgustaWestland CH-149 Cormorant

442 Transport and Rescue Squadron (French: 442^{e} Escadron de transport et de sauvetage) is a Royal Canadian Air Force tactical transport and search and rescue unit based at Canadian Forces Base (CFB) Comox in British Columbia. The squadron flies six CC-295 Kingfisher aircraft, replacing six CC-115 Buffalo STOL aircraft, which have been retired as of 2020, and five AgustaWestland CH-149 Cormorant rescue helicopters. One of each is on constant readiness to deploy in response to distress calls in the Victoria Search and Rescue Region, which includes most of British Columbia and the territory of Yukon as well as 560,000 square kilometres in the Pacific Ocean, up to 600 nautical miles (1,100 km) offshore. The squadron also serves as the operational training unit for the CH-149 Cormorant helicopter and CC-295 Kingfisher aircraft.

== History ==
The unit was first activated in 1942 flying Curtis Kittyhawks as 14 Fighter Squadron with the RCAF Western Air Command due to the threat to Canada's west coast after the Pearl Harbor attack. The squadron moved to Alaska and participated on strafing and bombing missions against then-Japanese held Kiska during the Aleutian Islands Campaign. The squadron was then renumbered to 442 Fighter Squadron and transferred to England in January 1944 and flew attack and long-range bomber escort sorties in Northwest Europe flying the North American Mustang IV, claiming over 58 enemy aircraft and hundreds of vehicles, locomotives and rail cars. The squadron was disbanded in England in 1945 following the end of hostilities, and reformed a year later at RCAF Station Sea Island as an auxiliary fighter squadron with deHavilland Vampires. Starting in 1956 the Vampires were augmented with the more modern Canadair Sabre 5. However, by 1958 they reequipped with deHavilland Otters and Beech Expeditors flying as a redesignated auxiliary transport squadron. It was again disbanded in 1964.

The squadron was reformed during the 1968 unification of the Canadian Forces as 442 Communications and Rescue Squadron at CFB Comox before being redesignated to its current name and role a few months later. Since then, 442 Transport and Rescue Squadron has become the busiest search and rescue unit in the country.

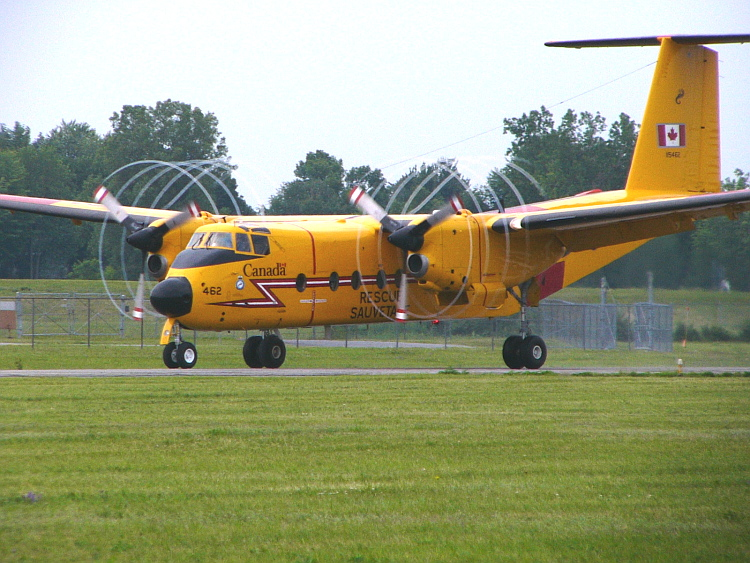
CC-115 Buffalo of 442 Squadron in 2004 (retired in 2020)

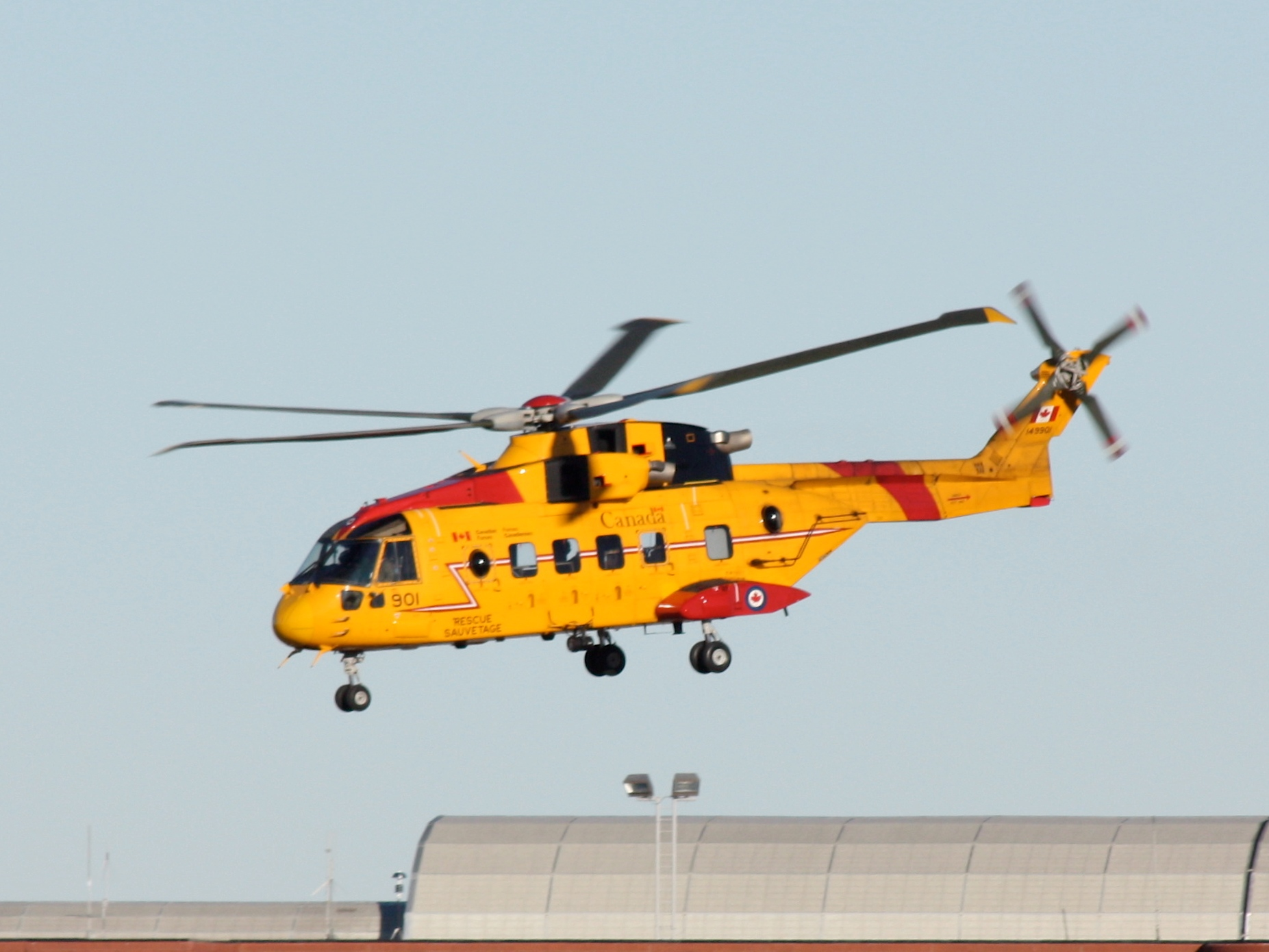
442 Squadron Cormorant 901 in 2008
