= Sikorsky CH-124 Sea King =

Canadian naval helicopter (1963–2018)

CH-124 Sea King
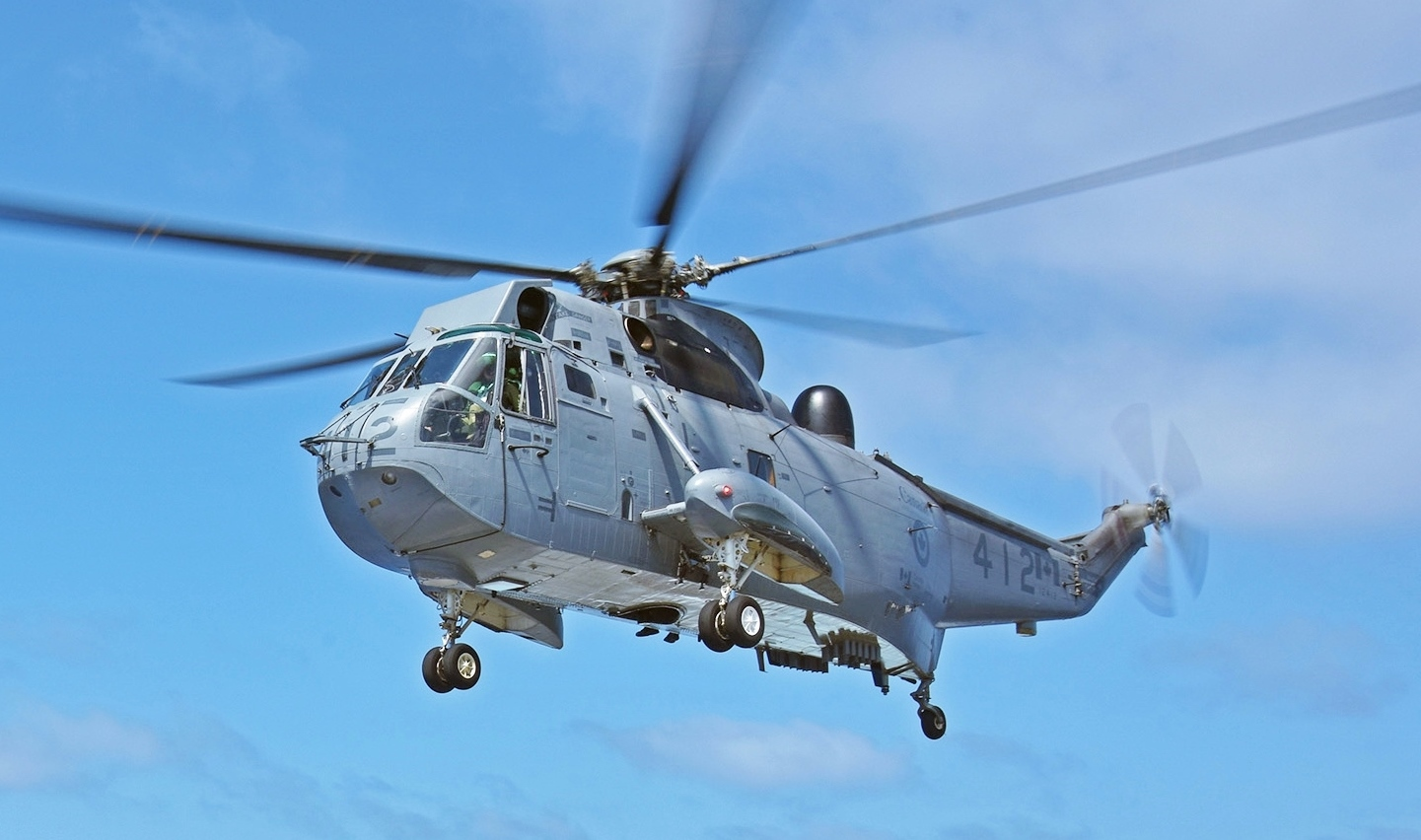
- A CH-124 Sea King of Royal Canadian Air Force in 2016

General information
- Type: ASW / utility helicopter
- National origin: United States / Canada
- Manufacturer: Sikorsky Aircraft
- Built by: United Aircraft of Canada
- Status: Retired from service, displayed.
- Primary users: Canadian Armed Forces Royal Canadian Navy; Royal Canadian Air Force
- Number built: 41

History
- Introduction date: 1963
- Retired: 1 December 2018
- Developed from: Sikorsky SH-3 Sea King

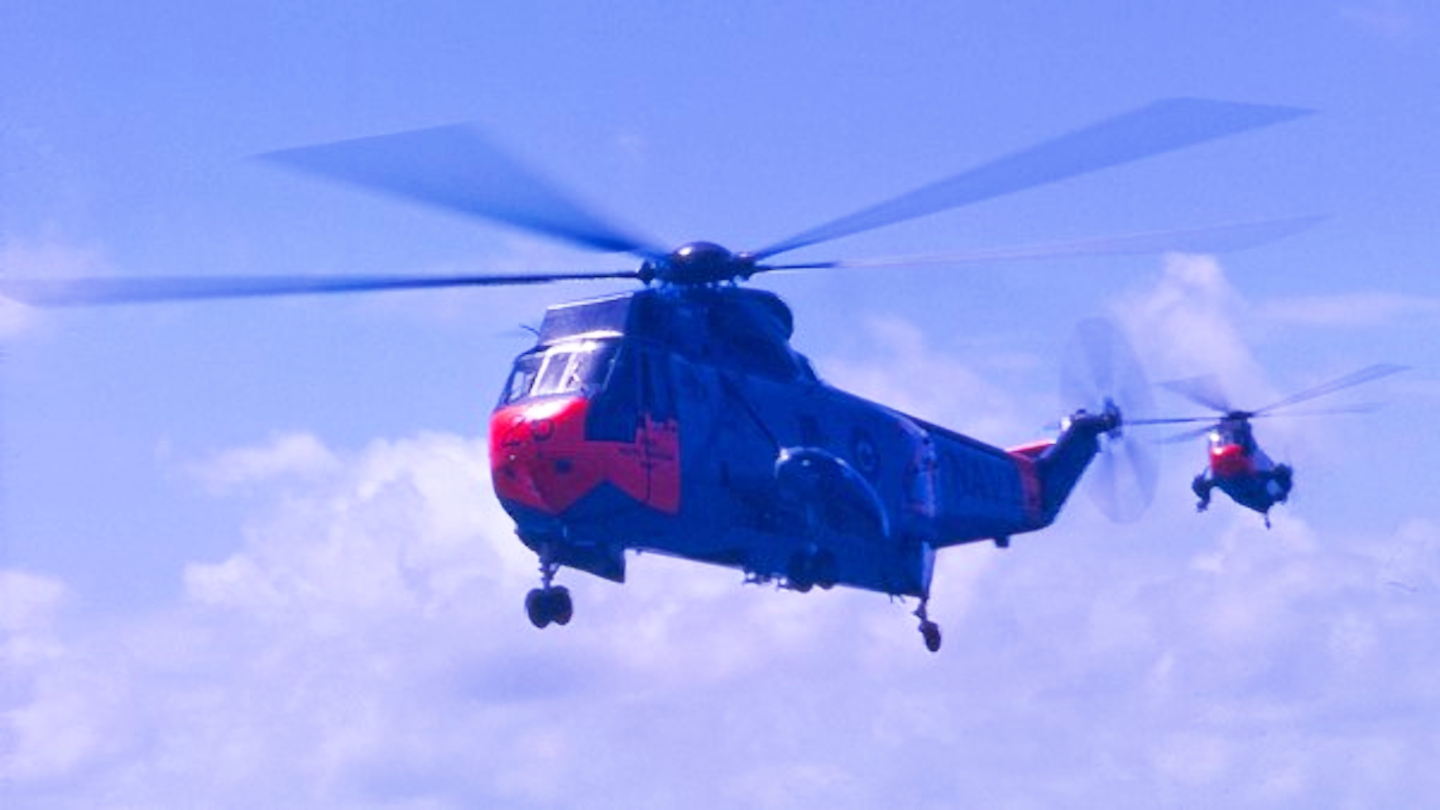
Two CH-124 Sea Kings approach HMCS Bonaventure in Feb 1968

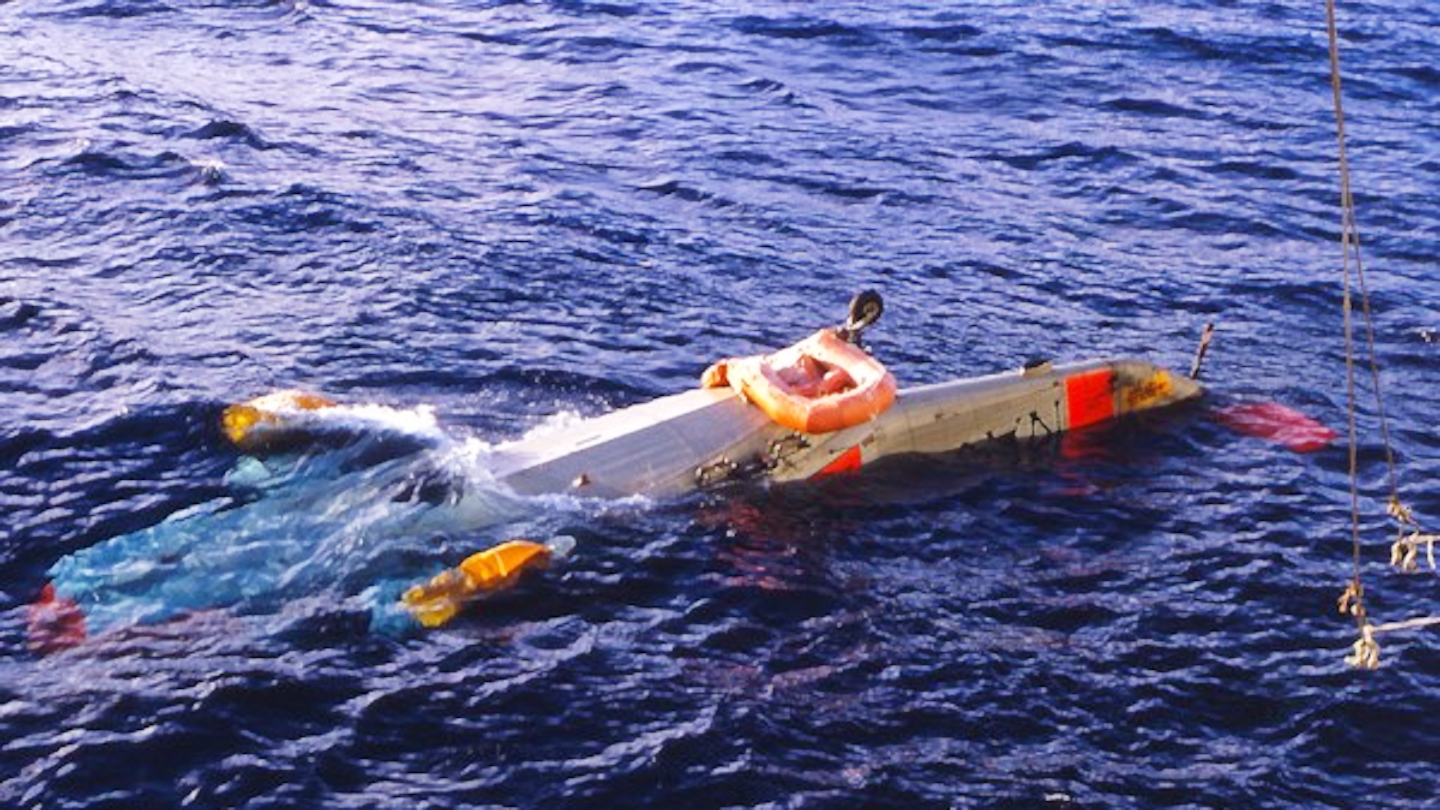
HMCS Bonaventure's downed CH-124 Sea King in Feb 1968

The Sikorsky CH-124 Sea King (formerly CHSS-2) is a twin-engined anti-submarine warfare (ASW) helicopter designed for shipboard use by Canadian naval forces, based on the US Navy's SH-3 Sea King. Most CH-124s were assembled in Quebec by United Aircraft of Canada. The CH-124 served with the Royal Canadian Navy (RCN) and Canadian Armed Forces from 1963 to 2018.

== Design and development ==
The advent of nuclear-powered submarines in the late 1950s let to the RCN assessing this new threat. While noisier than older submarines and thus detectable at longer ranges, nuclear submarines could also reach 30 knots (56 km/h) while submerged, faster than the RCN's new St. Laurent-class destroyer escort's top speed of 28.5 knots (52.8 km/h). There were doubts that destroyers could effectively pursue and destroy such fast vessels, even when operating in pairs. During a 25 February 1959 Naval Board meeting, it was decided to counter the threat by operating helicopters from destroyers. The RCN examined the feasibility of operating ASW helicopters from small escorts, adding a temporary helicopter landing platform to the Prestonian-class frigate HMCS Buckingham in mid-1956; successful trials were held in October 1956 using a Sikorsky HO4S-3. A larger temporary platform was fitted on the destroyer escort HMCS Ottawa; operational trials used an RCAF Sikorsky S-58, a much larger and heavier aircraft than the HO4S; these successful tests met with approval.

The RCN's then current HO4S-3 utility helicopter could not operate safely in inclement weather with a heavy weapons and sensor load, which would be imperative for the ASW role; hence, a more capable aircraft was needed. Initial 1959 studies identified two helicopters that seemed suitable—the Sikorsky S-61 (HSS-2) and the Kaman K-20 (HU2K)—but neither aircraft had flown at the time, so no choice was made. After further studies concluded that the smaller Kaman would better satisfy RCN requirements, the Treasury Board approved an initial procurement of 12 HU2K helicopters for $14.5 million in December 1960.

Despite this apparent setback for Sikorsky, several factors derailed Kaman's proposal. When the Naval Board held a follow-up meeting on 27 January 1961, it was revealed that the initial 12 units' asking price had nearly doubled to $23 million, only six weeks after approval from the Treasury Board. The Naval Board still endorsed the HU2K, but there were some misgivings over the sharp price increase and reports that Kaman's performance projections may be overly optimistic. The Naval Board decided to await upcoming USN sea trials of the HU2K ahead of a final decision. These trials confirmed the calculations of RCN staff members; the HU2K was substantially heavier than promised, hampering performance and rendering it incapable of meeting RCN requirements, even using a proposed upgraded engine. The Sea King was ultimately chosen for production on 20 December 1961.

The first of 41 helicopters would be delivered in 1963 carrying the designation CHSS-2 Sea King. Airframe components were made by Sikorsky in Connecticut but most CHSS-2s were assembled in Longueuil, Quebec, by United Aircraft of Canada (now Pratt & Whitney Canada), a subsidiary of Sikorsky's parent company, United Aircraft. On 27 November 1963, the new landing platform aboard HMCS Assiniboine was used for the first operational destroyer landing of a production CHSS-2. Upon the unification of Canada's military in 1968, the CHSS-2 was re-designated CH-124.

In the 1960s, the RCN developed a technique for landing large helicopters on small ship decks, using a 'hauldown' winch (called a "Beartrap"), earning aircrews the nickname of "Crazy Canucks". The Beartrap allows recovery of the Sea King in virtually any sea state.

== Operational service ==
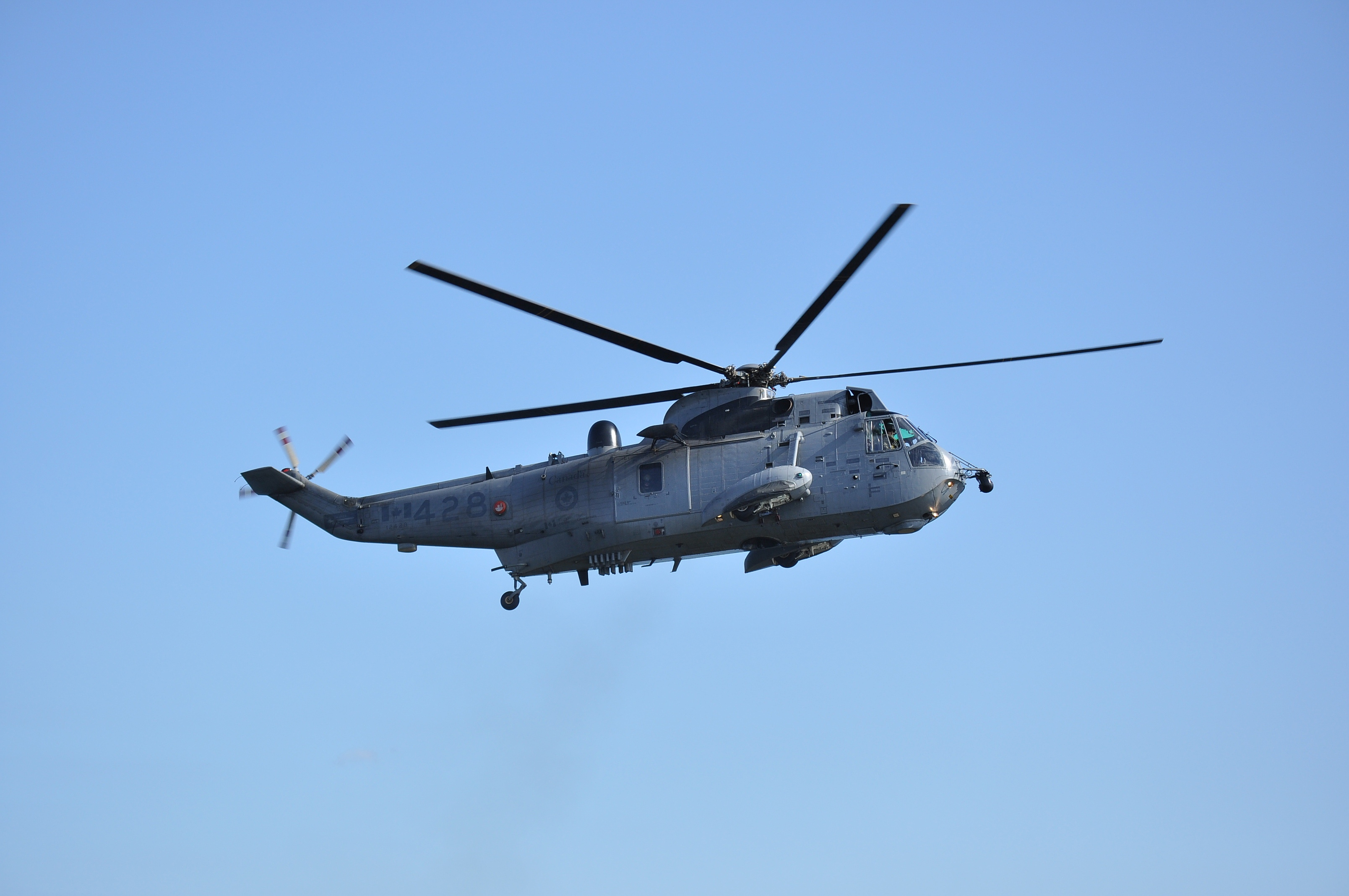
Sikorsky CH-124A Sea King

The Sea Kings were assigned to the former Iroquois-class destroyers (2 per ship with total of 6), Halifax-class frigates (1 per ship with total of 12), and the former Protecteur-class replenishment ships (3 per ship with total 6) as a means of extending the surveillance capabilities beyond the horizon. When deployed, each Sea King is accompanied by several crews. Each crew consists of two pilots, a Tactical Coordinator (TACCO), and an Airborne Electronic Sensor Operator (AESOp).

In order to find submarines, the Sea King's sonar uses a transducer ball at the end of a 450-foot cable. It can also be fitted with FLIR to find surface vessels at night.

The CH-124 has undergone numerous refits and upgrades, especially with regard to the electronics, main gearboxes and engines, surface-search radar, secure cargo and passenger carrying capabilities.

In 2013 the CH-124 fleet averaged 9–14,000 flying hours, while Sea Kings of other fleets go as high as 40,000 hours. Although the CH-124 had frequent technical issues, none are serious, and they could maintain an 87 percent serviceability rate.

On 1 December 2018, the CH-124 was officially retired in a ceremony at Vancouver Island, British Columbia, concluding 55 years of service. Of the surviving 28 Canadian Sea Kings, nine are destined for museums or to be displayed as monuments, 15 are to be sold, three scrapped, and one retained as a training aid.

=== Replacement ===
From 1983 onward attempts were made to replace the aging Sea King helicopters. Due to a series of financial and political issues, the process was hampered by repeated delays. In the end the CH-148 Cyclone, a new variant of the Sikorsky H-92 Superhawk was selected.

== Variants ==
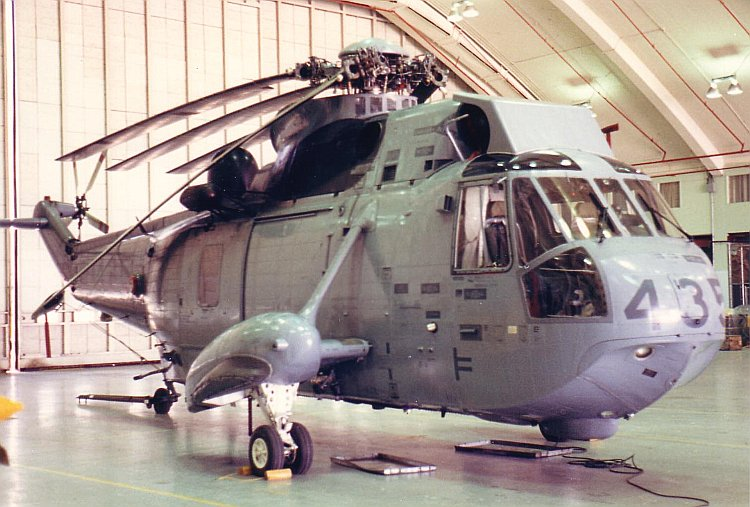
Sikorsky CH-124A Sea King with blades folded for storage.

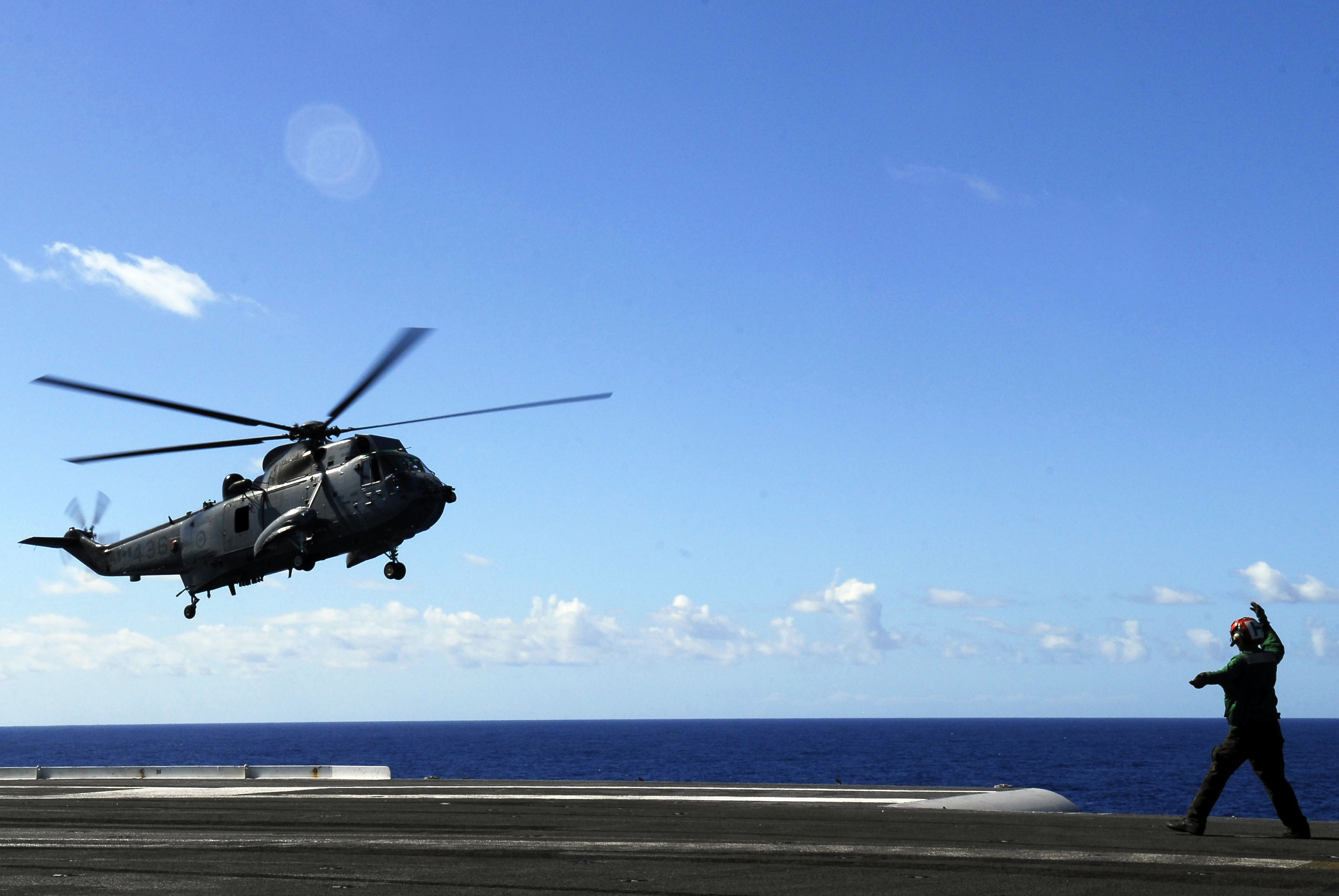
CH-124A Sea King aboard the aircraft carrier USS Kitty Hawk

CH-124
Anti-submarine warfare helicopter for the Royal Canadian Navy (41 assembled by United Aircraft of Canada).
CH-124A
The Sea King Improvement Program (SKIP) added modernized avionics as well as improved safety features.
CH-124B
Alternate version of the CH-124A without a dipping sonar but formerly with a MAD sensor and additional storage for deployable stores. In 2006, the five aircraft of this variant were converted to support the Standing Contingency Task Force (SCTF), and were modified with additional troop seats, and frequency agile radios. Plans to add fast-rope capability, EAPSNIPS (Engine Air Particle Separator / Snow & Ice Particle Separator) did not come to fruition.
CH-124B2
Six CH-124Bs were upgraded to the CH-124B2 standard in 1991–1992. The revised CH-124B2 retained the sonobuoy processing gear to passively detect submarines but, the aircraft was now also fitted with a towed-array sonar to supplement the ship's sonar. Since anti-submarine warfare is no longer a major priority within the Canadian Forces, the CH-124B2 were refitted again to become improvised troop carriers for the newly formed Standing Contingency Task Force.
CH-124C
One CH-124 operated by the Helicopter Operational Test and Evaluation Facility located at CFB Shearwater. Used for testing new gear, and when not testing new gear, it is deployable to any Canadian Forces ship requiring a helicopter.
CH-124U
Unofficial designation for four CH-124s that were modified for passenger/freight transport. One crashed in 1973, and the survivors were later refitted to become CH-124As.

== Former operators ==
NOTE: Last aircraft was retired in December 2018

Canada

- Royal Canadian Navy
- Royal Canadian Air Force
  - 443 Maritime Helicopter Squadron
  - 406 Maritime Operational Training Squadron
  - 423 Maritime Helicopter Squadron

== Aircraft on display ==
CH-124429 at Base Borden Military Museum

- CH-124401 - Shearwater Aviation Museum.
- CH-124405 - National Air Force Museum of Canada.
- CH-124407 - Comox Air Force Museum.
- CH-124417 - Victoria International Airport.
- CH-124426 - Canada Aviation and Space Museum.
- CH-124429 - Base Borden Military Museum.
- CH-124431 - Shearwater Aviation Museum.
- CH-124441 - Shearwater Aviation Park

== Specifications (CH-124 Sea King) ==
Orthographically projected diagram of the SH-3 Sea King.

Data from

General characteristics

- Crew: 4 (2 pilots, 1 navigator, 1 airborne electronic sensor operator)
- Capacity: 3 passengers
- Length: 54 ft 9 in (16.69 m)
- Height: 16 ft 10 in (5.13 m)
- Empty weight: 11,865 lb (5,382 kg)
- Gross weight: 18,626 lb (8,449 kg)
- Max takeoff weight: 22,050 lb (10,002 kg)
- Powerplant: 2 × General Electric T58-GE-8F / T58-GE-100 turboshaft engines, 1,500 shp (1,100 kW) each
- Main rotor diameter: 62 ft (19 m)
- Main rotor area: 3,019.5 sq ft (280.52 m^{2})
- Blade section: - NACA 0012

Performance

- Maximum speed: 144 kn (166 mph, 267 km/h)
- Range: 539 nmi (620 mi, 998 km)
- Service ceiling: 14,700 ft (4,500 m)
- Rate of climb: 1,310–2,220 ft/min (6.7–11.3 m/s)

Armament

- 2× Mk 46 Mod V anti-submarine torpedoes
- Various sonobuoys and pyrotechnic devices
- door guns (some variants)

== Replicas ==
The Artificial Reef Society of British Columbia is commissioning a full-sized model of the CH-124 to be submerged with the destroyer HMCS Annapolis.

== See also ==
- Water bird emergency landing

Related development

- Sikorsky SH-3 Sea King
- Sikorsky S-61R
- Sikorsky HH-52 Seaguard
- Westland Sea King

Aircraft of comparable role, configuration, and era

- Aérospatiale SA 321 Super Frelon
- Kaman SH-2 Seasprite
- Kamov Ka-25
- Mil Mi-14
- Sikorsky SH-60 Seahawk
- Westland Lynx

Related lists

- List of active Canadian military aircraft
