= 413 Transport and Rescue Squadron =

- Squadron badge
- Active: 1941–1945; 1947–1950; 1951–1961; 1968–present
- Country: Canada
- Branch: (Canada) Royal Canadian Air Force
- Role: Transport and rescue
- Part of: 14 Wing Greenwood
- Home station: CFB Greenwood
- Nickname: Tusker
- Mottos: Ad vigilamus undis ("We watch the waves")
- Battle honours: Atlantic 1941–1943; Ceylon 1942; Eastern Waters 1942–1944

Insignia
- Squadron Badge: Elephant head over a maple leaf

Aircraft flown
- Fighter: F-86 Sabre; Avro CF-100
- Patrol: PBY Catalina
- Transport: CH-113 Labrador; C-130 Hercules; CH-149 Cormorant; CC-295 Kingfisher

413 Transport and Rescue Squadron is an air force squadron of the Canadian Armed Forces. It was originally a flying boat squadron of the Royal Canadian Air Force during the Second World War. It currently operates the C-130 Hercules, the CC-295 Kingfisher and the CH-149 Cormorant in transport plus search and rescue roles at CFB Greenwood.

== History ==
No. 413 Squadron was created as the third RCAF squadron attached to RAF Coastal Command and equipped with PBY Catalina flying boats. 413 Squadron flew reconnaissance and anti-submarine operations over the North Atlantic under Coastal Command until beginning the move to Ceylon in March 1942. It probably came under command of Air Forces in India once the squadron fully arrived in April at Koggala. The squadron gained fame for the actions of Squadron Leader Leonard Birchall, who detected a large Japanese task force approaching Ceylon. This allowed time for the defenders to prepare for the Easter Sunday Raid (5 April 1942), and foiled what could have been a major blow to the Royal Navy in the Indian Ocean. The squadron made reconnaissance flights over the Indian Ocean until 1945.

It was stood down in January 1945 and sent back to the UK to reequip, in possible preparation for transfer to RAF Bomber Command. However nothing came of this and the squadron was disbanded in February 1945 at Bournemouth.

Reformed at RCAF Rockcliffe on April 1, 1947, it took over the duties of No. 13 (Photographic) Squadron. It operated in this role until November 1, 1950.

The squadron reformed again on August 1, 1951, as a fighter squadron at CFB Bagotville. First equipped with Harvards and Vampires while awaiting the F-86 Sabre. In 1953 they deployed to Zweibrücken, Germany as part of 3 Wing. The squadron stood down on April 7, 1957, and was then reformed on May 1 operating the Avro CF-100 Canuck at Bagotville. The squadron again disbanded on December 30, 1961.

The squadron was reactivated at CFB Summerside on July 8, 1968, in its current role of a Transportation and Rescue Squadron. With the closure of Summerside, the squadron relocated to CFB Greenwood on June 10, 1991. The CH-113 Labrador was used during this time.

On July 13, 2006, 413 Squadron suffered the first fatal crash of a Cormorant in Canadian service when a CH-149 (Aircraft 149914) based at CFB Greenwood crashed while conducting a night training exercise near Canso, Nova Scotia. Killed in the incident were Sgt. Duane Brazil, 39; Master Cpl. Kirk Noel, 33; and Cpl. Trevor McDavid, 31, four other crew members were injured.

On August 21, 2015, LCol Scott Murphy handed over command of 413 Sqn to LCol James Marshall.

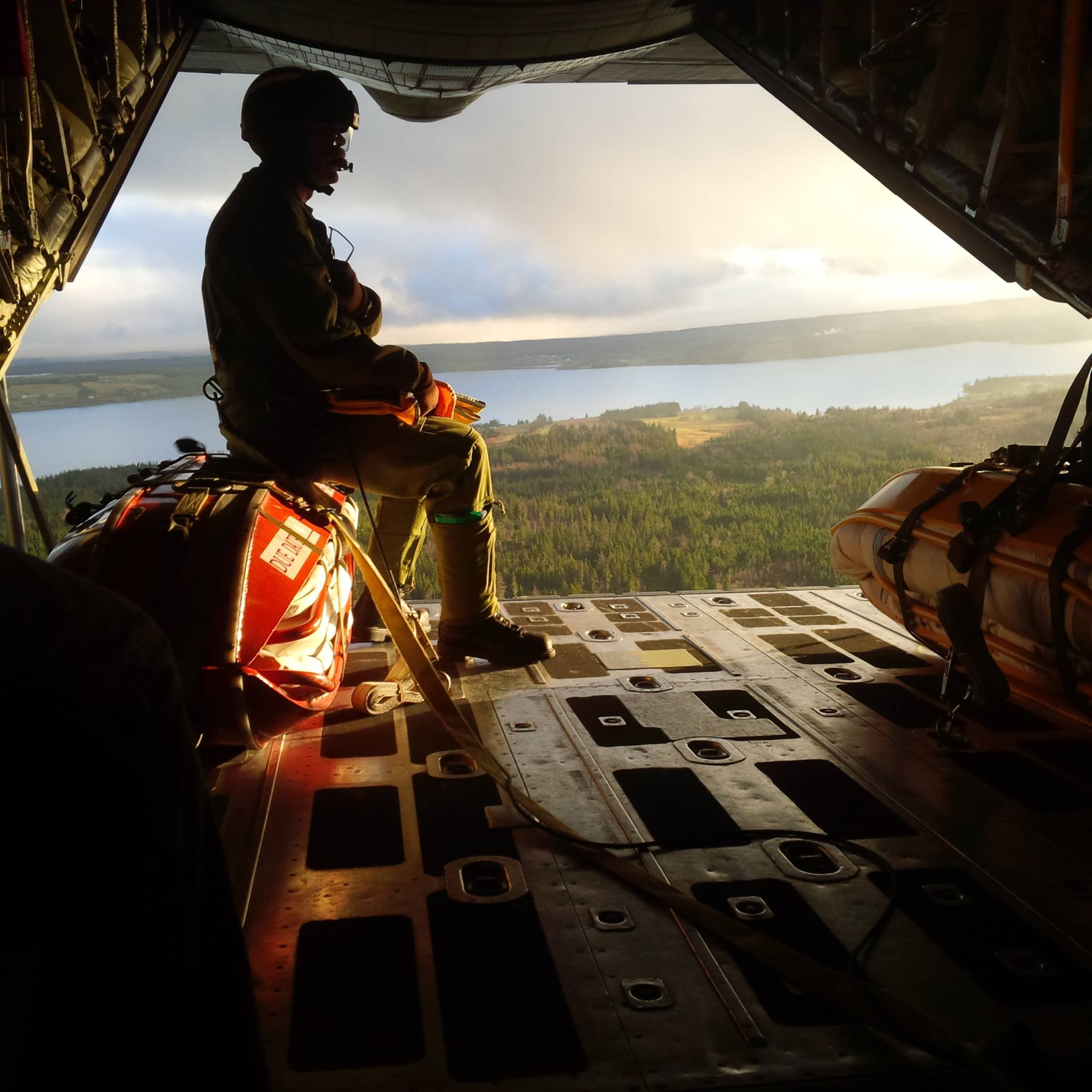
Anticipating a cargo launch over Cape Breton Island as part of a Search and Rescue Training Exercise.

== Operations ==
413 Transport and Rescue Squadron (TRS) conducts search and rescue and airlift throughout an 1,800,000 square mile area in eastern Canada. The unit is made up of approximately 200 personnel including aircrew, an aircraft maintenance section and administrative support.

As the primary air search and rescue unit on Canada's East Coast, 413 Squadron crews cover an area extending from the south of Nova Scotia, north to Iqaluit on Baffin Island as far west as Quebec City and east out to the middle of the Atlantic.

The Joint Rescue Coordination Centre, Halifax (JRCC) operationally controls one Hercules and four Cormorant aircraft for primary Search and Rescue response. 413 Squadron has crews on standby 24-hours a day to respond to marine vessels or aircraft in distress, to carry out medical evacuations, or search for missing persons year round.

413 Squadron has an intimate working relationship with the non-profit Civil Air Search and Rescue Association (CASARA) in the Maritimes and Newfoundland/Labrador. Both the Hercules and the Cormorant carry out annual visits to each of the zones in the Halifax Search and Rescue Region to assist in the training of CASARA member as spotters.

413 Squadron is also tasked by 1 Canadian Air Division (1 CAD) to provide one Hercules for global strategic transport. Missions include humanitarian airlift and support of other units of the Canadian Forces. Generally the destinations are in North America, the Caribbean, or Western Europe, but could be anywhere in the world.
