= Burnt Lands alvar =

Alvar in Ontario, Canada

Burnt Lands Provincial Park
- IUCN category Ia (strict nature reserve)
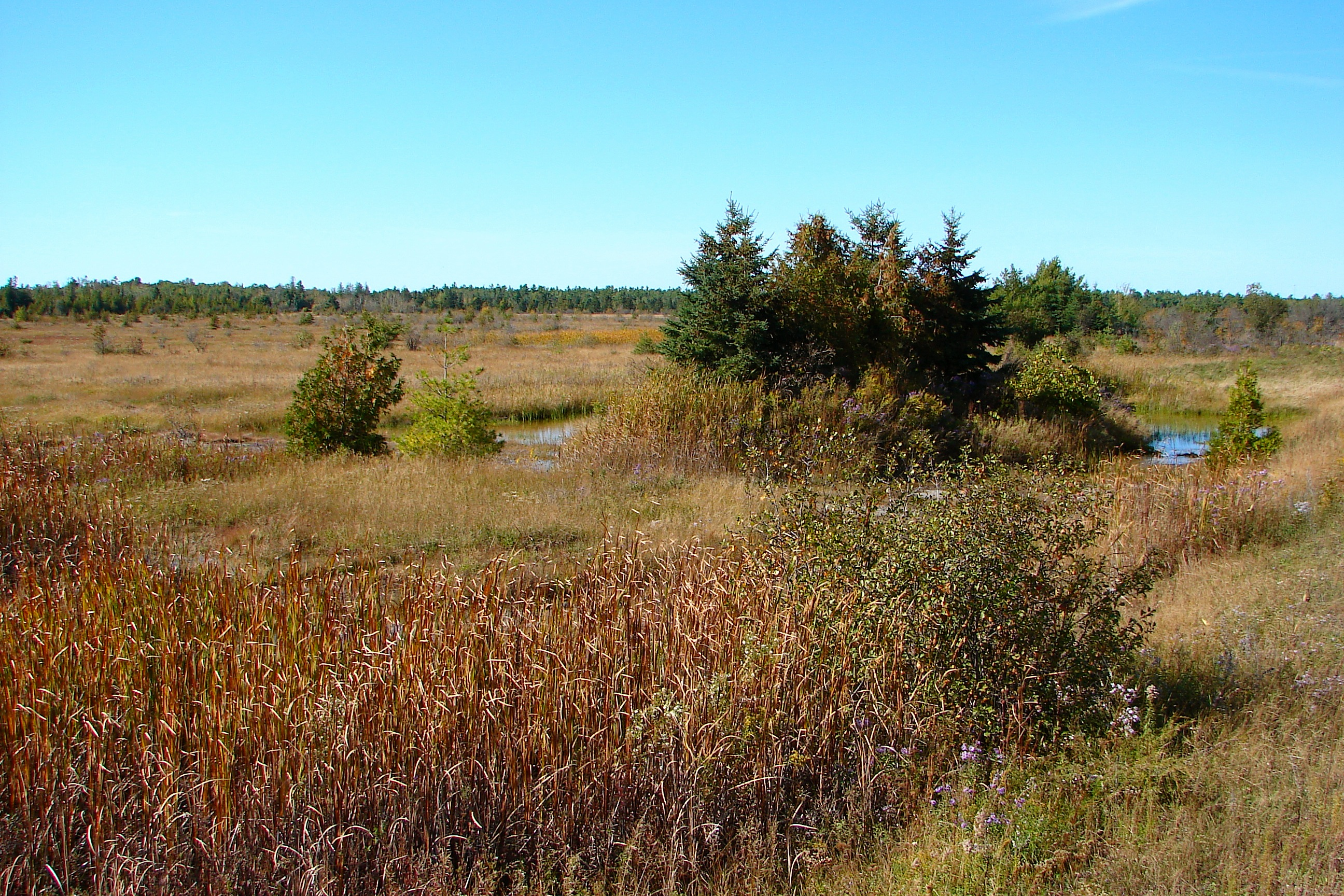
- Burnt Lands Alvar
- Interactive map of Burnt Lands Provincial Park
- Location: Ottawa and Mississippi Mills, Ontario
- Coordinates: 45°15′40″N 76°09′00″W
- Area: 516.00 ha (1,275.1 acres)
- Established: 2003
- Governing body: Ontario Parks
- Website: www.ontarioparks.com/park/burntlands

The Burnt Lands is an alvar between Almonte and Ottawa near Upper Huntley, Ontario, Canada. It probably obtained its name from one of the forest fires that swept the area during early European settlement.

It is possible that fires assist in creating or maintaining alvars. However, the shallow soil, with alternating drought and flooding, is likely the main factor. The main point is that in a land that is typically covered in forest, alvars provide small area of open prairie-like conditions for plants that require such conditions.

This alvar is one of the best examples of this habitat type in Lanark County and in southern Ontario. It has been the subject of numerous scientific studies. Because of its significance, The Ontario Ministry of Natural Resources has designated ca 610 hectares (1,500 acres) of the alvar as an Area of Natural and Scientific Interest. A smaller parcel of several hundred hectares is protected within the Burnt Lands Provincial Park (Nature Reserve).

It is a popular destination with local naturalists, including bird-watchers and photographers.

== Description ==
Some of the distinctive plants found here include Cooper's milk vetch and Ram's-Head Ladyslipper. There are 82 breeding bird species and 48 butterfly species. The alvar is thought to have existed in some form since the end of the last ice age, since it has globally rare snails (Vertigo hannai) and even a kind of carabid beetle found nowhere else in the world.

Canadian Forces Station Carp, better known as the "Diefenbunker", operated a radio receiver site in the alvar during the cold war in support of the Emergency Government Headquarters system.

Threats to the alvar include urban sprawl, subdivisions, quarries, illegal dumping of household trash and construction materials, illegal sand quarrying, and all-terrain vehicles. There is also a problem with jack pine trees, once planted by the Ontario Ministry of Natural Resources, that are now shading out some of the rare plant species; some experts suggest that these trees need to be removed. A fire in 1999 removed some of the encroaching forest and produced open meadows, which, in 2008 had nearly twice the number of plant species as in adjoining unburned areas.

== Burnt Lands Provincial Park ==
The alvar is protected within the Burnt Lands Provincial Park. The park consists of two non-contiguous parcels of land, totaling 516 hectares (1,280 acres) of land.

It is a non-operating park without any visitor activities or facilities.

== See also ==
- Panmure Alvar - nearby similar alvar
