= Emergency Government Headquarters =

Underground infrastructure system in Canada

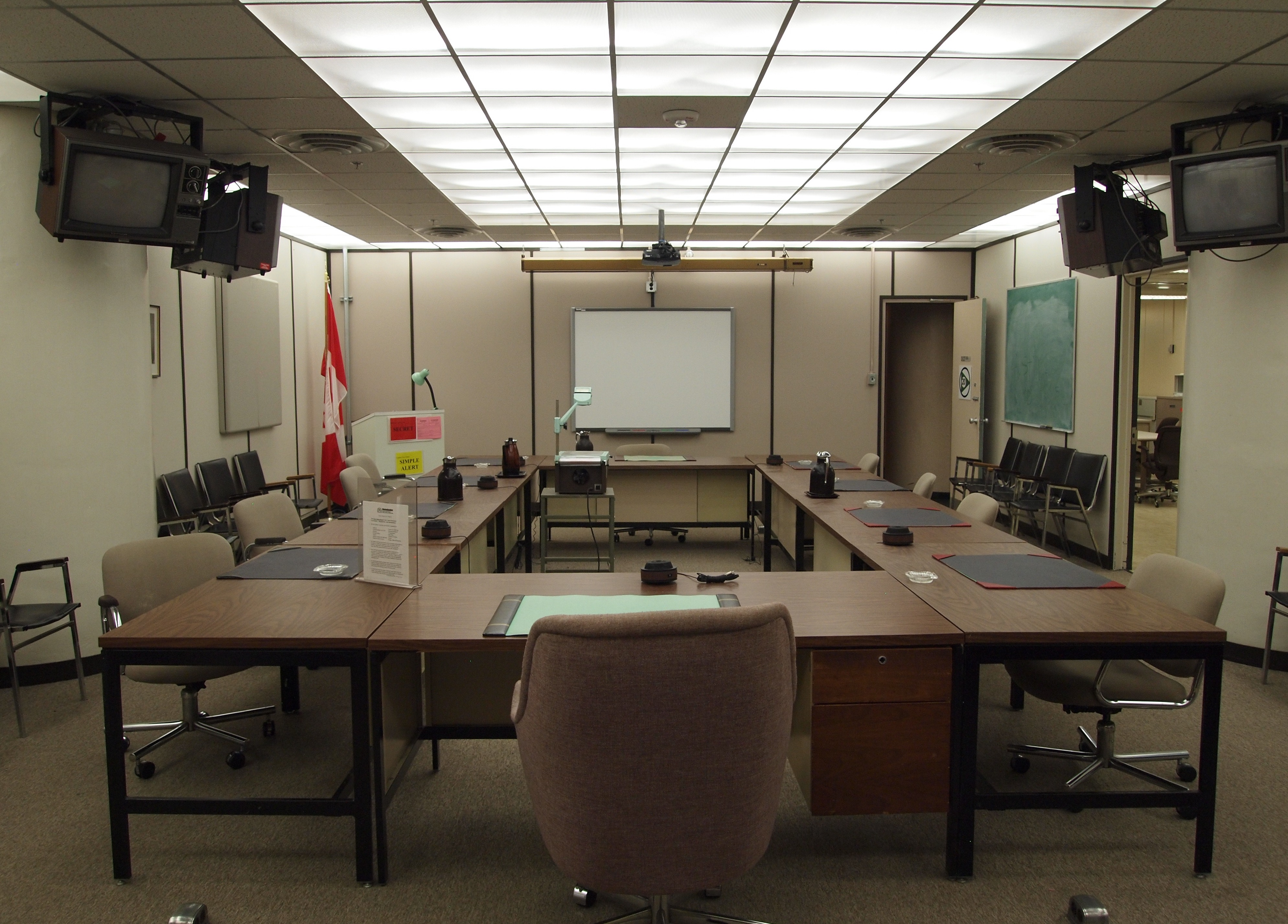
Conference room at CEGHQ, former CFS Carp.

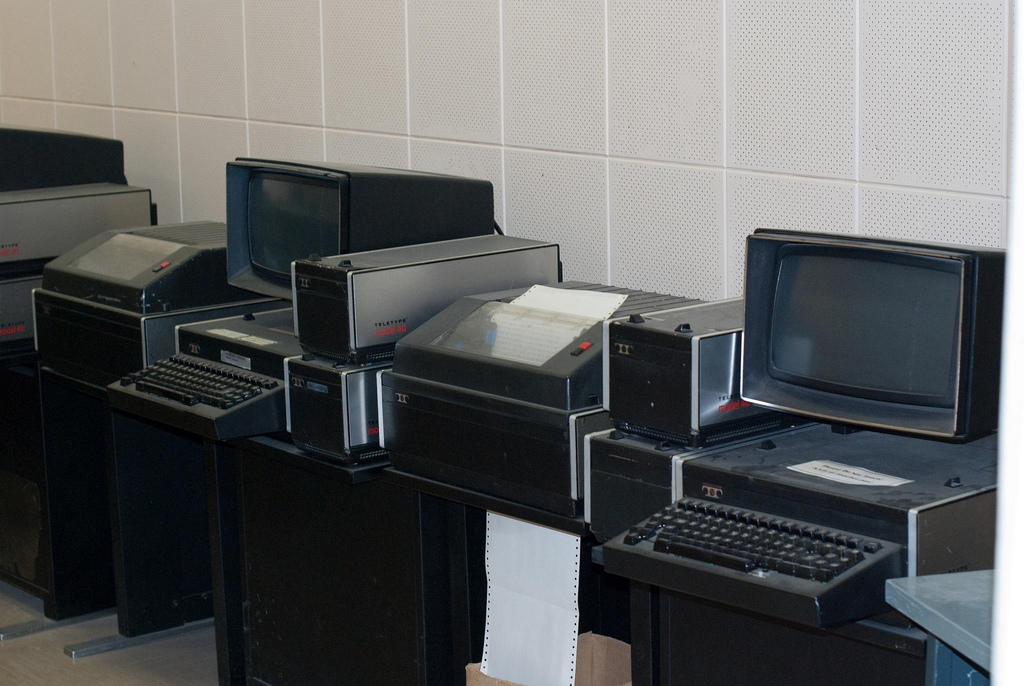
Teletype terminals at CEGHQ, former CFS Carp.

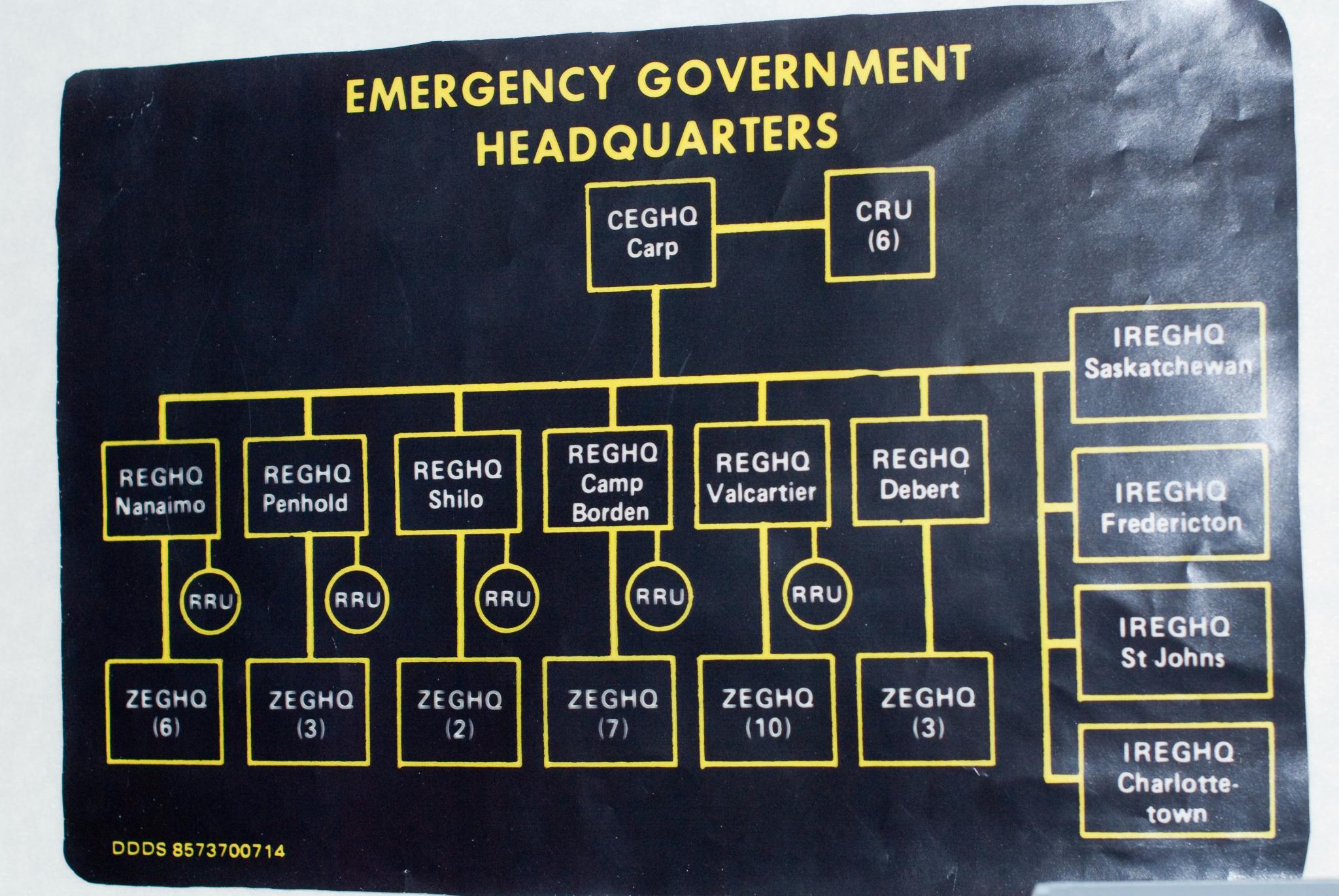
Organigramme.

Emergency Government Headquarters is the name given for a system of nuclear fallout shelters built by the Government of Canada in the 1950s and 1960s as part of continuity of government planning at the height of the Cold War. Situated at strategic locations across the country, the largest of these shelters are popularly referred to as "Diefenbunkers", a nickname coined by federal opposition politicians during the early 1960s. The nickname was derived from the last name of the Prime Minister of the day, John Diefenbaker, who authorized their construction. Over fifty facilities were built along several designs for various classes of service.

Most of these facilities were built, often in great secrecy, at rural locations outside major cities across Canada. The majority of the larger facilities were two-storey underground bunkers while the largest at CFS Carp had four floors; these facilities were designed to withstand a near-miss from a nuclear explosion. Each underground facility had entrances through massive blast doors at the surface, as well as extensive air filters and positive air pressure to prevent radiation infiltration. Underground storage was built for food, fuel, fresh water, and other supplies for the facilities which were capable of supporting several dozen people for a period of several weeks. The facilities were operated by personnel from the Royal Canadian Corps of Signals, renamed to Communications Command after the 1968 unification of the Canadian Armed Forces.

== Terminology ==
| Title | Abbreviation | Description and purpose |
|---|---|---|
| Central Emergency Government Headquarters | CEGHQ | Designed to shelter several hundred senior civil servants, politicians, and military officials serving in the Government of Canada and Canadian Armed Forces whose workplaces were in the Ottawa area for multiple weeks. The location of what became CFS Carp was upwind from the National Capital Region. The original location selected for the CEGHQ was approximately 10 km (6.2 mi) west of Almonte at 45°15′7″N 76°19′32″W. However, the Almonte site was abandoned in favour of Carp due to extensive ground water. |
| Regional Emergency Government Headquarters | REGHQ | Designed to shelter up to 200 senior civil servants, politicians, and military officials from nearby provincial capitals for up to 1-2 weeks. |
| Interim Regional Emergency Government Headquarters | IREGHQ | |
| Municipal Emergency Government Headquarters | MEGHQ | Designed to shelter up to several dozen municipal staff, politicians, and military officials in larger urban centres for several days. They were constructed by municipalities to federal specifications. They were intended to help coordinate rescue and reconstruction efforts. |
| Zone Emergency Government Headquarters | ZEGHQ | Built within the basements of existing or new buildings, designed to shelter up to 70 persons. |
| Federal Department Relocation Site | FDRS | Multiple locations upwind from the National Capital Region where essential staff in departments within the Government of Canada could work in a self-contained facility for up to 2 weeks. |
| Communications Relay Unit | CRU | A dispersed network of radio transmitter/receiver stations around the National Capital Region supporting the CEGHQ and FDRS facilities. These functioned as detachments to the CEGHQ. |
| Regional Relay Unit | RRU | A dispersed network of radio transmitter/receiver stations located near, and providing support to, REGHQ and MEGHQ facilities. Each RRU functioned as a detachment to an REGHQ or MEGHQ. |
| Nuclear Detonation Reporting Post | NUDET | A dispersed network of observation posts containing instrumentation to be staffed during a time of crisis. Each NUDET would have trained specialists who would report the location of ground zero for a nuclear detonation, as well as the height of the explosion, yield of the weapon, time of detonation, intensity of radioactive fallout, and latest known meteorological data. There were 3-5 NUDETs located in a circular pattern around 16 Canadian urban centres believed to be targets. NUDETs were situated between 48 km (30 mi) and 128 km (80 mi) from each urban centre. |

== Facilities ==
| Type | Lodger Unit | Location | Province | Coordinates | Current status |
|---|---|---|---|---|---|
| CEGHQ | CFS Carp | Carp | Ontario | 45°21′06″N 76°02′50″W | Open to the public as Diefenbunker: Canada’s Cold War Museum |
| REGHQ | Camp Nanaimo | Nanaimo | British Columbia | 49°08′54″N 123°58′18″W | Locked and Flooded |
| REGHQ | CFB Penhold | Penhold | Alberta | 52°10′22″N 113°51′48″W | Demolished |
| REGHQ | CFB Shilo | Shilo | Manitoba | 49°48′01″N 99°37′40″W | Demolished. Mound used by local units for PT training. |
| REGHQ | CFB Borden | Borden | Ontario | 44°17′32″N 79°53′56″W | Entrance covered with dirt. |
| REGHQ | CFB Valcartier | Valcartier | Quebec | 46°53′13″N 71°29′12″W | In use as barracks |
| REGHQ | CFS Debert | Debert | Nova Scotia | 45°25′15″N 63°27′3″W | Open to the public as Debert Military Museum |
| MEGHQ | MEGHQ-FREEPORT, County of Waterloo | Kitchener | Ontario | 43°25′25″N 80°24′45″W | Disused, proposed to be restored |
| FDRS | Kemptville | Kemptville | Ontario | | |
| FDRS | Pembroke | Pembroke | Ontario | | |
| FDRS | Renfrew | Renfrew | Ontario | | |
| FDRS | Arnprior | Arnprior | Ontario | | |
| FDRS | Cornwall | Cornwall | Ontario | | |
| FDRS | Carleton Place | Carleton Place | Ontario | | |
| FDRS | Smith's Falls | Smiths Falls | Ontario | | |
| CRU | CFS Carp Richardson Detachment | Richardson | Ontario | 44.93673°N 76.1449247°W | Sealed with concrete |
| CRU | CFS Carp Almonte Detachment | Almonte | Ontario | 45.26188°N 76.15213°W | |
| CRU | CFS Carp Dunrobin Detachment | Dunrobin | Ontario | 45.448407°N 76.047474°W | |
| RRU | CFS Debert Masstown Detachment | Masstown | Nova Scotia | 45°22′38″N 63°26′6″W | |
| RRU | CFS Debert Great Village Detachment | Great Village | Nova Scotia | 45°25′18″N 63°33′33″W | |
| RRU | Camp Nanaimo Nanoose Bay Detachment | Nanoose Bay | British Columbia | 49°16′27″N 124°13′35″W | |
| RRU | CFB Penhold Transmitter Detachment | Penhold | Alberta | 52°7′42″N 113°53′55″W | |
| RRU | CFB Penhold Receiver Detachment | Penhold | Alberta | 52°11′3″N 113°58′7″W | |
| RRU | CFB Shilo Hughes Detachment | Camp Hughes | Manitoba | 49°52′17″N 99°32′26″W | |
| RRU | CFB Borden Edenvale Detachment | Edenvale | Ontario | 44°26′11″N 79°57′51″W | |
| RRU | CFB Borden Brentwood Detachment | Brentwood | Ontario | 44°20′40″N 79°55′38″W | |
| RRU | CFB Valcartier St-Raymond Detachment | St-Raymond | Quebec | 46°51′12″N 71°49′30″W | |

== Decommissioning and legacy ==
Following the end of the Cold War, all but one of the Diefenbunkers have been decommissioned and either covered over, demolished or sold. Only the facility located at CFB Valcartier remains in use, as an itinerant accommodation barracks.

The two Diefenbunkers which members of the public may visit are located at former CFS Carp in Ontario and CFS Debert. CFS Carp was decommissioned in 1994 and has been converted into a year-round museum dedicated to the history of the Cold War. CFS Debert in Nova Scotia was open for tours for the decade following its closure in 1994 as part of a local military museum. It was later used for summer accommodation for an air cadet gliding school. In 2009, it was sold and then resold for use as a secure data storage facility. In 2018, CFS Debert reopened to the public, featuring historical tours, escape rooms, laser tag, special events, and more. In 2019, the present owner of the Diefenbunker at former CFS Debert purchased the neighbouring NATO building. The plans for the NATO building are currently unknown.

The Diefenbunker that was located at former CFS Penhold in Alberta was decommissioned in 1994. It was sold to a pair of businessmen from Red Deer in 1995 for CA$472,000 (equivalent to $884,731 in 2025). Members of the Hells Angels, a criminal outlaw motorcycle gang, in addition to a group of white supremacists and a car theft group from Miami, were also rumoured to have been interested in purchasing the bunker; the businessmen later claimed the Hells Angels had offered them CA$1.3 million for it. However, the government repurchased the building in 1998 for CA$1.25 million (equivalent to $2.25 million in 2025) in addition to $100,000 in disbursement fees due to potential security risks; they had the shelter demolished in 2001.

A Toronto Star report in February 2020 discussed another nuclear bunker, intended for the politicians of Toronto, Ontario, built during the Cuban Missile Crisis. Located in a home on Old Yonge St. in Aurora, Ontario and still in place, this concrete-reinforced room was intended "to serve as a control centre to house Toronto politicians and emergency personnel in the event of a nuclear attack". According to the report, the bunker includes maps, status boards for recording casualties, one hundred telephone lines, water tanks and an escape route.

== In popular culture ==
The film The Sum of All Fears has a scene that was shot on location in the Diefenbunker at former CFS Carp. The scene consisted of the President of the United States character, President Robert Fowler played by actor James Cromwell, and his political advisors performing a war game scenario.

The finale of the second season of The Amazing Race Canada featured a task completed at the Diefenbunker at former CFS Carp. One member of each team had to search among the bunker's vast array of rooms for three of five hidden souvenirs: a helicopter, a tank, a jeep, a plane, and a compass.

== See also ==
- Canada in the Cold War
- Central Government War Headquarters, British equivalent to CFS Carp/CEGHQ
- Regional seat of government, British equivalent to REGHQs and MEGHQs
