= Panmure Alvar =

Coordinates: 45°19′10″N 76°14′00″W

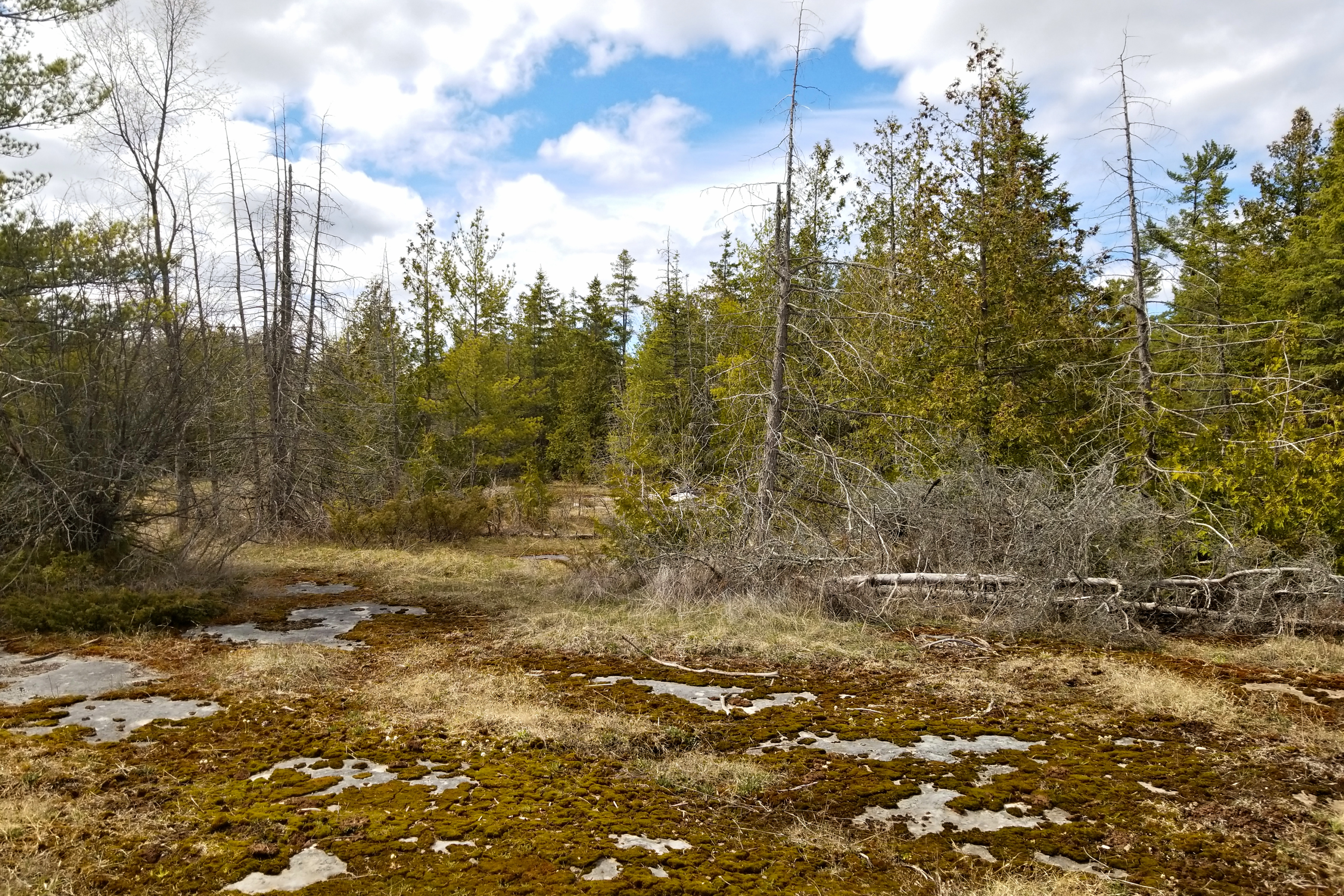
Panmure Alvar

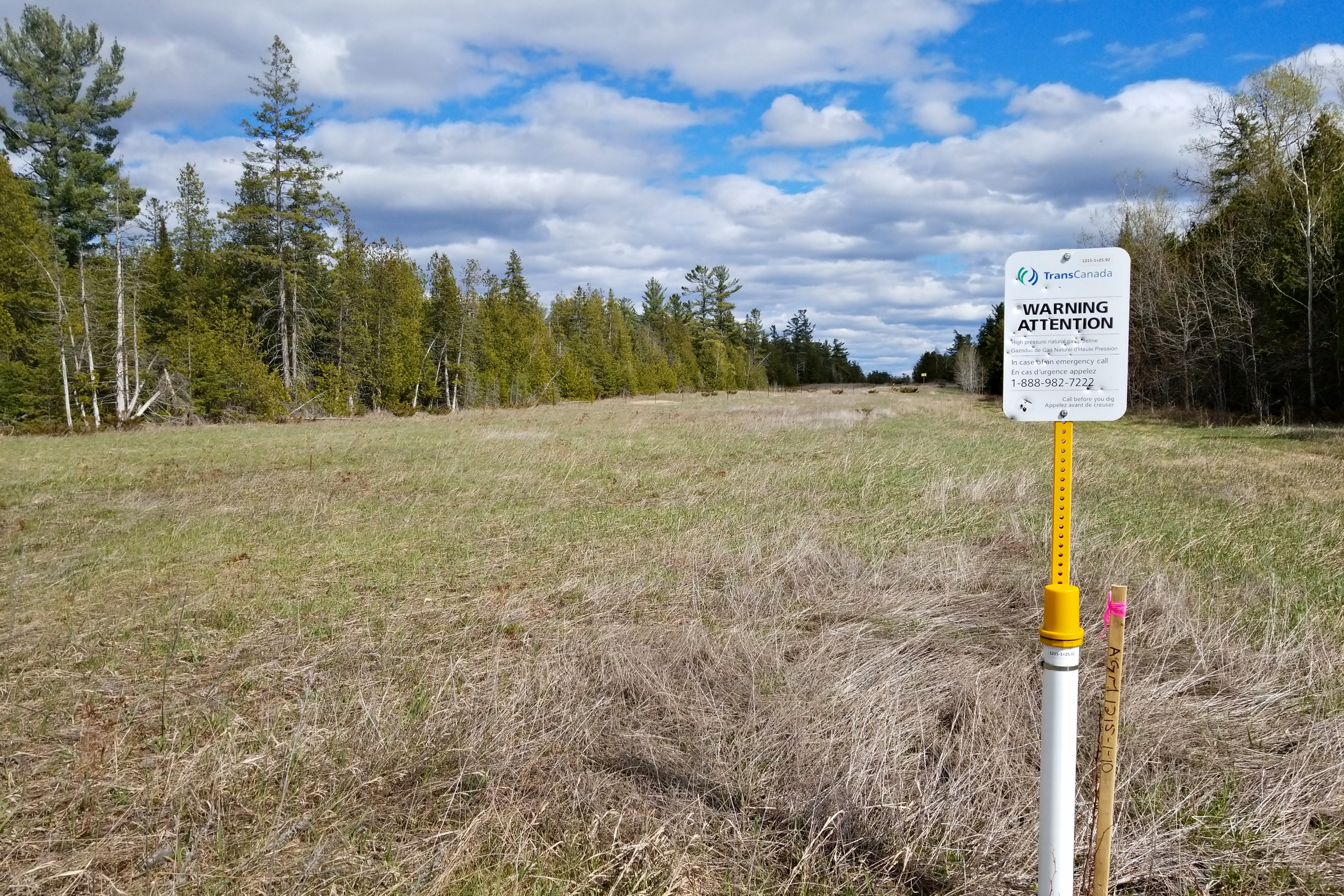
Natural gas pipeline right-of-way through Panmure Alvar

The Panmure Alvar is an alvar that lies on a limestone plain straddling the north eastern edge of Lanark County and the western boundary of the City of Ottawa, Ontario, Canada, east of the town of Pakenham. In alvars, shallow soil with alternating drought and flooding conditions creates open clearings with distinctive plant and animal communities. Fire may also play a role.

The forests are mostly white cedar, white spruce and poplar, with openings dominated by common juniper. The alvar clearings contain regionally significant plants such as Crawe's sedge (Carex crawei) and Hookedspur violet (Viola adunca). A total of 82 native plant species have been recorded from this location, including the provincially significant Cooper's milk vetch (Astragalus neglectus).

The nearest alvar is the provincially significant Burnt Lands alvar. Panmure is considered to be the second best example of limestone plain with open alvar in the Smiths Falls Plain physiographic region of site district 6-11. About 725 hectares (1,790 acres) are considered as a candidate Area of Natural and Scientific Interest.

The TransCanada natural gas pipeline goes through the middle of the alvar.
