= CFS Carp Richardson Detachment =

Canadian military radio transmitter station

Site information
- Type: Military Radio Transmitter Site
- Controlled by: Canadian Army

Location
- Coordinates: 44.93673°N 76.1449247°W

Site history
- Built: 1962
- Built by: Canadian Army
- In use: 1962-1994

Location of Richardson Detachment

The CFS Carp Richardson Detachment was a military operated radio communications transmitter station linked by landline to CFS Carp located off Lanark County Road 10 East of Perth, Ontario. The detachment was built with a hardened two story underground bunker built to accommodate the Signals personnel needed to operate the transmitter in case of war, as well as a mess hall, sleeping quarters, offices, decontamination facilities, and its own power generation facilities. Its location was chosen to be far enough away from CFS Carp to ensure survivability in the case of a nuclear strike against CFS Carp, and to reduce the risk of interference from its twenty powerful radio transmitters.

Separate radio receiver detachments were located and administered by CFS Carp in the region; the CFS Carp Almonte Detachment and the CFS Carp Dunrobin Detachment were linked to CFS Carp by land line also.
