= TransCanada pipeline =

Natural gas pipeline through Canada

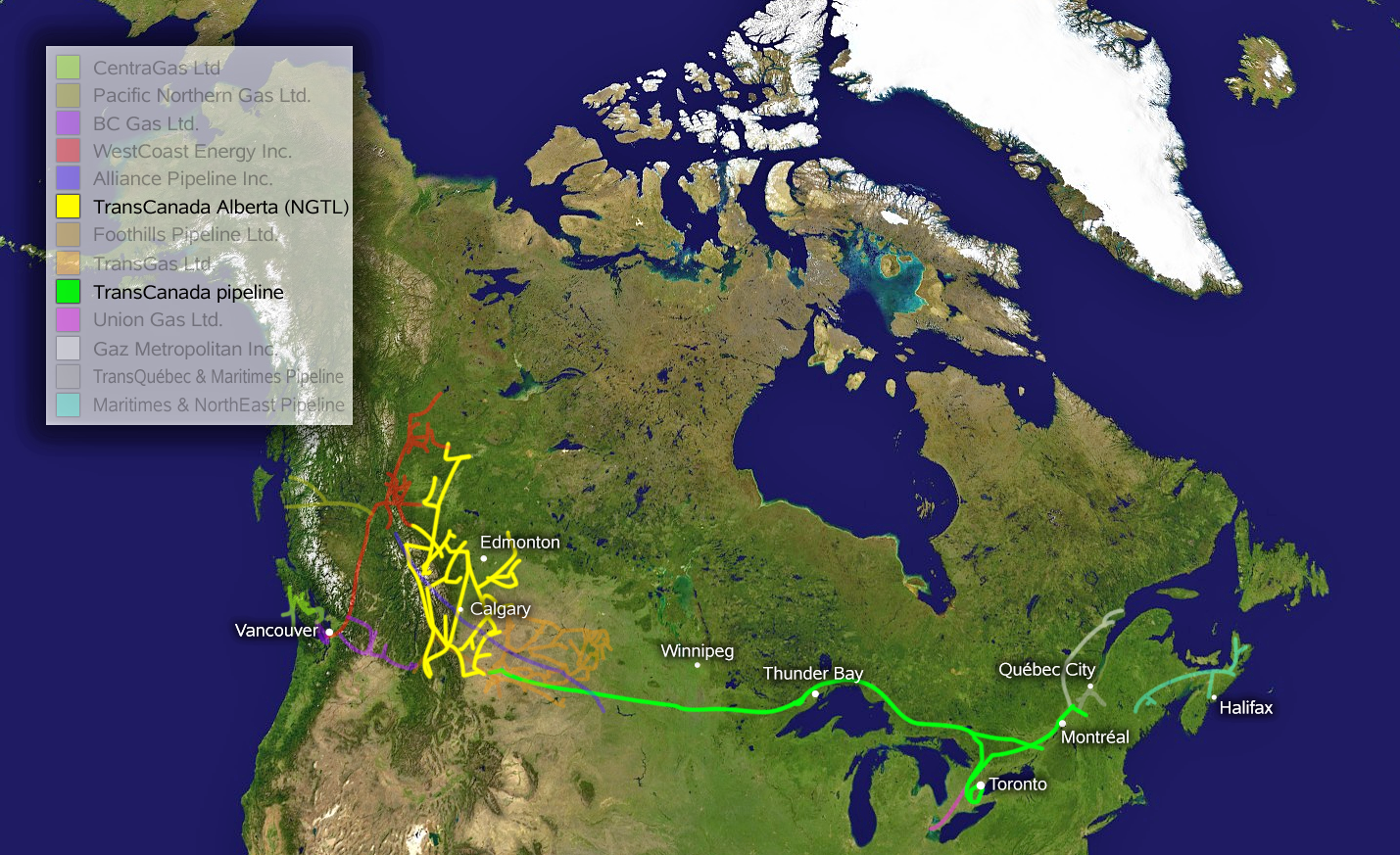
The route of the TransCanada pipeline

The TransCanada pipeline is a system of natural gas pipelines, up to 48 inches (1.2 m) in diameter, that carries gas through Alberta, Saskatchewan, Manitoba, Ontario and Quebec. It is maintained by TransCanada PipeLines, LP. It is the longest pipeline in Canada.

== Creation ==
Canada's population was booming during the 1950s, and energy shortages were becoming problematic. Canadian company TransCanada PipeLines Limited was incorporated in 1951 to undertake the construction of a natural gas pipeline across Canada. The financing of the project was split 50–50 between American and Canadian interests.

Two applicants originally expressed interest in moving gas east: Canadian Delhi Oil Company (now called TCPL) proposed moving gas to the major cities of eastern Canada by an all-Canadian route, while Western Pipelines wanted to stop at Winnipeg with a branch line south to sell into the mid-western United States. In 1954 C. D. Howe, a member of the Cabinet of Canada of a Liberal Government, forced the two companies to merge, with the all-Canadian route preferred over its more economical but American-routed competitor. This imposed solution reflected problems encountered with the construction of the Interprovincial oil pipeline. Despite the speed of its construction, the earlier line caused angry debate in Parliament, with the Opposition arguing that Canadian centres deserved consideration before American customers and that "the main pipeline carrying Canadian oil should be laid in Canadian soil". By constructing its natural gas mainline along an entirely Canadian route, TCPL accommodated nationalist sentiments, solving a political problem for the federal government.

The regulatory process for TCPL proved long and arduous. After rejecting proposals twice, Alberta finally granted its permission to export gas from the province in 1953. At first, the province waited for explorers to prove gas reserves sufficient for its thirty-year needs, intending to only allow exports in excess of those needs. After clearing this hurdle, the federal government virtually compelled TCPL into a merger with Western pipelines. When this reorganized TCPL went before the Federal Power Commission for permission to sell gas into the United States, the Americans greeted it coolly. The FPC proved skeptical of the project's financing and unimpressed with Alberta's reserves.

== Politics ==
The 1,090-kilometre section crossing the Canadian Shield was the most difficult leg of the pipeline. Believing construction costs could make the line uneconomic, private sector sponsors refused to finance this portion of the line. Since the federal government wanted the line laid for nationalistic reasons, the reigning Liberals put a bill before Parliament to create a crown corporation to build and own the Canadian Shield portion of the line, leasing it back to TCPL.

The Louis St. Laurent government aggressively restricted debate on this bill to get construction underway by June 1956, knowing that delays beyond that month would postpone the entire project a year. The use of closure created a Parliamentary scandal. Known as the Pipeline Debate, this parliamentary episode contributed to the government's defeat at the polls in 1957, ending many years of Liberal rule, and bringing in a government under Prime Minister John Diefenbaker.

The bill was passed and construction of the TransCanada pipeline began.

A stock trading scandal surrounding Northern Ontario Natural Gas, the contractor for the Northern Ontario leg of the pipeline, also implicated Sudbury mayor Leo Landreville and Ontario provincial cabinet ministers Philip Kelly, William Griesinger and Clare Mapledoram between 1955 and 1958.

== Construction ==
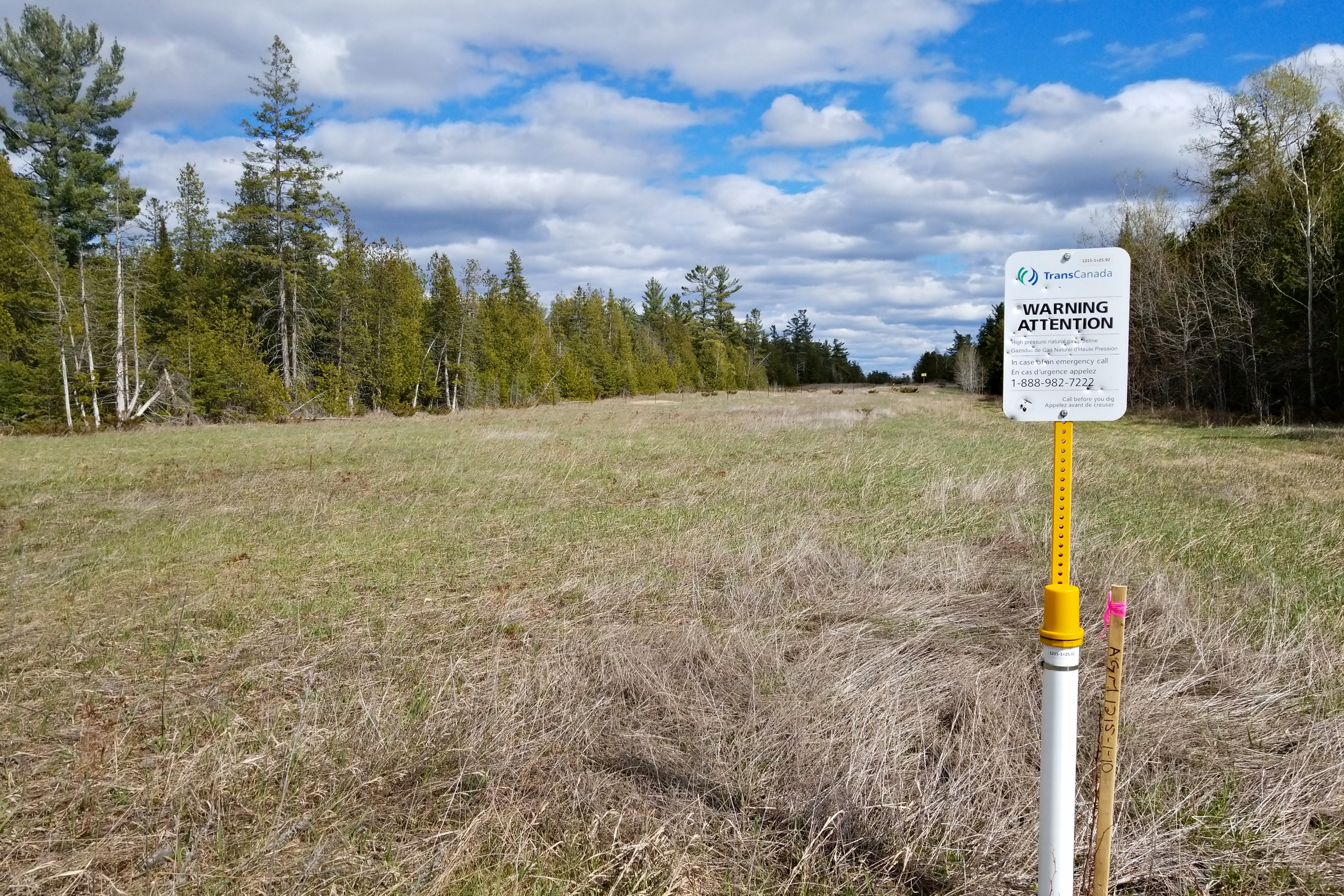
The TransCanada pipeline right-of-way through Panmure Alvar, west of Ottawa

The completion of this project was a spectacular technological achievement. In the first three years of construction (1956–1958), workers installed 3,500 kilometres of pipe, stretching from the Alberta–Saskatchewan border to Toronto and Montreal. Gas service to Regina and Winnipeg commenced in 1957 and the line reached the Lakehead before the end of that year.

Building the Canadian Shield leg required continual blasting. For one 320-metre (1,050 ft) stretch, the construction crew drilled 2.4-metre (8 ft) holes into the rock, three abreast, at 56-centimetre intervals. Dynamite broke up other stretches, 300 metres (1,000 ft) at a time.

On 10 October 1958, a final weld completed the line and on 27 October, the first Alberta gas entered Toronto. For more than two decades, the TransCanada pipeline was the longest in the world. Only in the early 1980s was its length finally exceeded by a Soviet pipeline from Siberia to Western Europe.

== Incidents ==
- In late 1957, during a high pressure line test on the section of the line from Winnipeg to Port Arthur (today called Thunder Bay), about five and a half kilometres of pipeline blew up near Dryden. After quick repairs, the line delivered Alberta gas to Port Arthur before the end of the year, making the entire trip on its own wellhead pressure.
- On 30 May 1979 an explosion caused evacuations in Englehart, Ontario, about 200 kilometres north of North Bay, Ontario
- On 1 December 2003, a rupture in the pipeline occurred at approximately 53°53′N 117°41′W (120 km south of Grande Prairie, Alberta). 14 hours later, another rupture and fire occurred 15 km downstream from the initial incident. According to TransCanada PipeLines, the breaks were immediately isolated, and any already escaped gas was allowed to burn off.
- On 20 July 2009, the Peace River Mainline in northern Alberta exploded, sending 50-metre-tall flames into the air and razing a two-hectare wooded area. According to CBC News, reports about the causes and actual extent of the explosion were redacted from a January 2011 government report and were only fully revealed after a media inquiry in 2014.
- On 13 September 2009 a similar explosion to that of 1979 occurred, in Englehart, Ontario, leaving a 6.1-metre (20 ft) hole at the explosion site.
- On 19 February 2011, a pipeline explosion occurred just outside Beardmore, Ontario, 190 kilometres northeast of Thunder Bay.
- On 25 January 2014, a fire broke out around 1:15 a.m. local time on the Canadian Mainline natural gas pipeline about 25 kilometres south of Winnipeg near St. Pierre-Jolys, Manitoba. Five homes were evacuated as a precaution after the explosion.

== See also ==
- History of the petroleum industry in Canada
