= Diefenbunker =

Cold War bunker and museum in Ottawa, Canada

Canadian Forces Station Carp
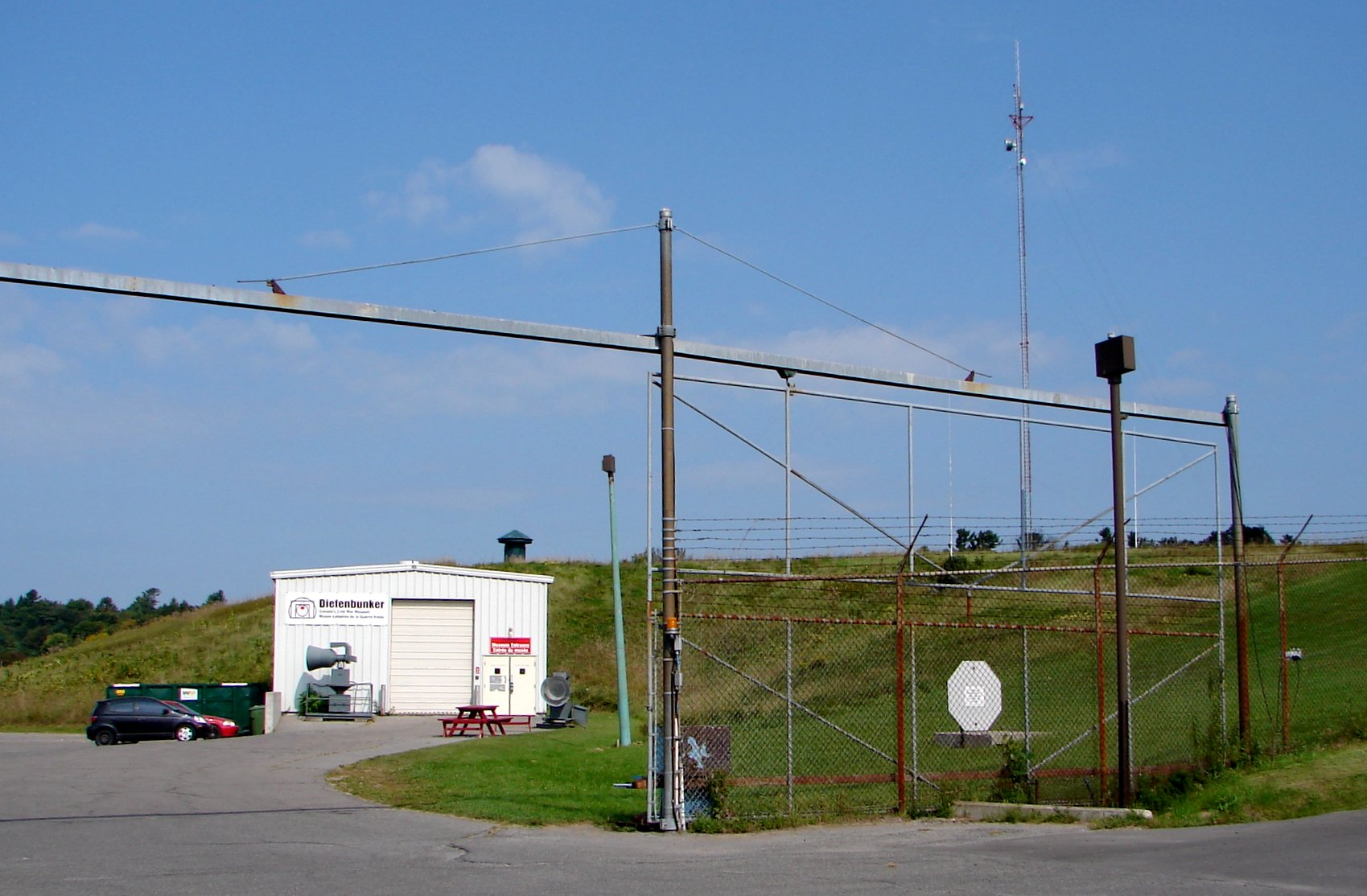
- Carp Diefenbunker gate and entrance
- Interactive map of Canadian Forces Station Carp
- 45°21′06″N 76°02′50″W
- Location: Ottawa, Ontario, Canada

History
- Founded: 1962
- Founder: Diefenbunker Development Group
- Built: 1959–1961
- Original use: Emergency Government Headquarters

Site notes
- Architect(s): Foundation Corporation of Canada, L. Col. Ed Churchill
- Current use: Museum
- Governing body: Diefenbunker, Canada's Cold War Museum
- Website: Diefenbunker: Canada's Cold War Museum

National Historic Site of Canada
- Official name: Diefenbunker / Central Emergency Government Headquarters National Historic Site of Canada
- Designated: 1994

The Diefenbunker, formerly known by its military designation, Canadian Forces Station Carp (CFS Carp), is a large underground four-storey reinforced concrete bunker and nuclear fallout shelter located in the rural area of Carp, Ontario approximately 30 km (19 mi) west of downtown Ottawa. Between 1957 and 1961, during the Cold War the Government of Canada led by then Prime Minister John Diefenbaker authorized the Diefenbunker to be designed and built as the Central Emergency Government Headquarters (CEGHQ Carp) in an attempt to ensure the continuity of government subsequent to a nuclear weapons attack by the Soviet Union. In 1994, CFS Carp was decommissioned and closed.

In 1994, the Diefenbunker was designated a National Historic Site of Canada because it is considered the most important surviving Cold War site in Canada. The bunker is important as an engineering achievement and to the critical path method of planning used in its construction. In addition, the Diefenbunker is symbolic of the Cold War, a strategy of nuclear deterrence and the Canadian people's determination to survive as a nation following a nuclear war. The Historic Sites and Monuments Board of Canada (HSMBC) plaque located at the Diefenbunker states:

Irreverently known as the "Diefenbunker," this structure is a powerful symbol of Canada's response to the Cold War. Designed in the 1950s to withstand all but a direct hit by a nuclear weapon, it was intended to shelter key political and military personnel during a nuclear attack. Fortunately, it never served its intended purpose, although the Diefenbaker government made plans to retreat to its protection during the Cuban missile crisis of 1962. The bunker functioned as the hub of a communications network and civil defence system until it closed in 1994.

In 1998, the facility was re-opened as a museum called the "Diefenbunker: Canada's Cold War Museum" allowing the general public year-round access to tour the facility.

== History ==
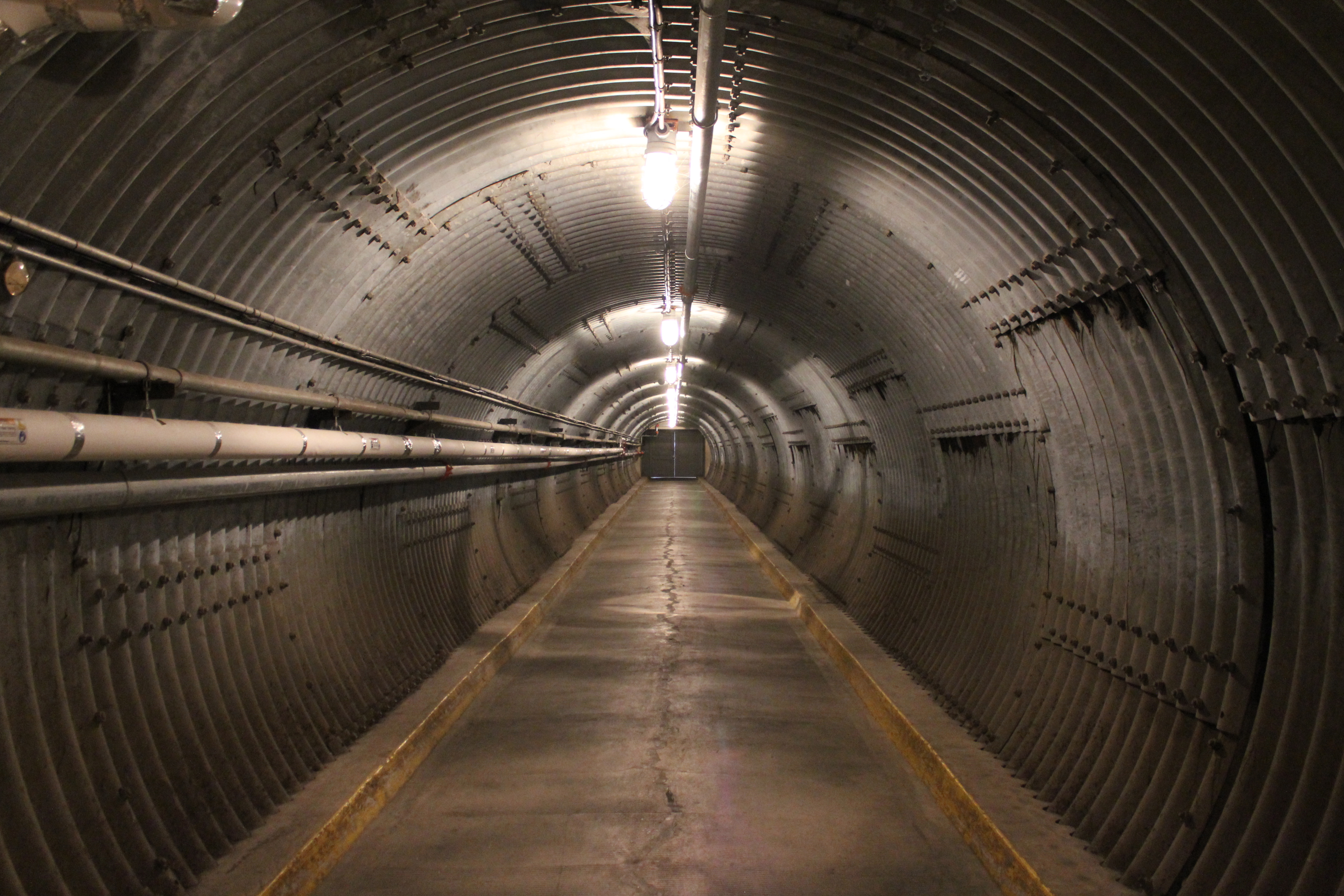
The blast tunnel entrance. The doors to the actual bunker are perpendicular to this tunnel which reduces the effects of a nuclear shock wave.

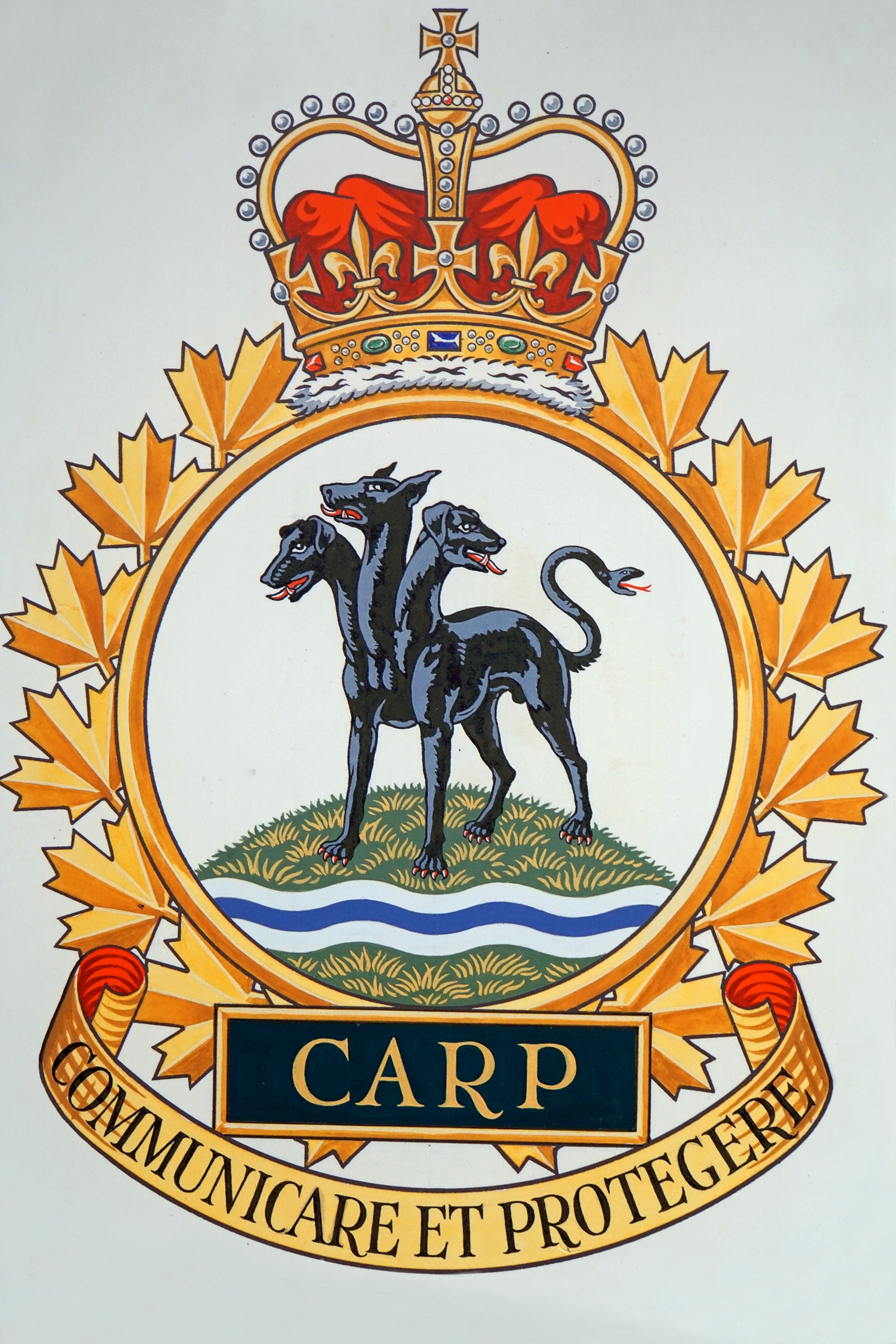
Unit Crest of CFS Carp, Communicate and Protect

In 1958, at the height of the Cold War and the infancy of the intercontinental ballistic missile (ICBM) threat, Prime Minister John Diefenbaker authorized the creation of close to 50 Emergency Government Headquarters (nicknamed "Diefenbunkers" by opposition parties) across Canada. These shelters were part of what came to be known as the Continuity of Government plan, which was meant to protect various members of government in the event of a nuclear attack.

The original site, some 9.7 km (6.0 mi) east of Almonte (45°15′06.66″N 076°19′31.05″W), was abandoned when ground water proved impossible to remove. An abandoned gravel pit outside Carp was selected instead, where construction soon began in 1959 and was completed by 1962.

The Carp shelter would be the largest of such facilities (over 9,300 m^{2} (100,000 sq ft)) and the only one in the immediate Ottawa area. The underground 4-storey bunker required 32,000 tonnes of concrete and 5,000 tonnes of steel. The structure was capable of withstanding a nuclear blast of up to 5 megatons from 1.8 km (1.1 mi) away. It had massive blast doors at the surface, as well as extensive air filters to prevent radiation infiltration. Although supposedly effective against surface nuclear detonations, the facility was later found to be vulnerable to conventional Bunker buster bombs developed after its construction, as these bombs had time delay fuses that would detonate after they had penetrated deeply enough underground.

Underground storage was built for food, fuel, fresh water, and other supplies. The bunker was built to accommodate 565 people for up to one month without receiving additional supplies from the outside. It included an emergency broadcast studio for the Canadian Broadcasting Corporation and a vault on the lowest level to hold the gold reserves of the Bank of Canada.

These facilities were administered by the Royal Canadian Corps of Signals (later the Communications and Electronics Branch). A decentralized transmitter site, the Richardson Detachment, with numerous transmitter antennas, was located further to the west near Perth, Ontario that was supported from a 2-storey underground facility of similar construction to the Carp facility but much smaller. The Perth bunker has seen some recent local controversy, as it still remains on government owned land, surrounded by local development. Radio receiving facilities CFS Carp Almonte Detachment and CFS Carp Dunrobin Detachment, with complete receiving antenna arrays, were also built in the region, however, all of those buildings were above ground.

== Diefenbunker, Canada's Cold War Museum ==
CFS Carp was decommissioned in 1994 following the reduction of the ICBM threat.

From 1959 to 1994, the site was owned and operated by the Canadian Department of National Defence. After the local municipality took control of the facility in 1994, the community took a great interest in the bunker, requesting access to public tours of the facility. The local municipality took control of the facility and a group of local volunteers, recognizing the heritage and tourism value of the Carp Diefenbunker, undertook to open the facility as a cold war museum and conduct public tours. It was purchased by the Diefenbunker Development Group in 1998, and officially opened as a museum. The name of the facility was changed to "Diefenbunker, Canada's Cold War Museum" shortly thereafter. It is currently open year-round for public tours.

Many areas of the bunker, including the PM's Suite, the Emergency Government Situation Centre, the CBC Emergency Broadcasting Studio, the Military Federal Warning Centre, the External Affairs Ministerial Office, the Public Works Minister's Office and the Bank of Canada Vault, are being restored to their operational condition. The rest of the 358 rooms have been converted to exhibits of the Cold War era.

=== Growth of the Museum ===
Upon its opening in 1998, the museum was run entirely by volunteers. However, the 5,000 visitors received by the museum that year was too much to be handled solely by volunteers.

In 1999, the museum's second year of operation, a curator was hired along with some students. The museum's visitation doubled to 10,000 people that year.

The museum continued to grow in popularity during the 2000s. Close to 15,000 visitors passed through the Diefenbunker in 2000. Additional part-time staff were hired throughout the year to keep up with museum maintenance and upkeep. As of 2008, the Diefenbunker averages approximately 25,000 visitors each year. Four full-time staff, nine part-time staff and numerous volunteers work to keep the museum running smoothly. In 2012, the museum had 45,280 visitors. This was one of the highest increases in attendance other than the opening year of the Bunker. In 2017, Canada's sesquicentennial, the Diefenbunker welcomed 88,000 visitors through its blast doors. Since March 2016, the museum has also hosted an escape room that they state is the world's largest.

The mandate of Diefenbunker, Canada's Cold War museum is "to increase throughout Canada and the world, interest in and a critical understanding of the Cold War, by preserving the Diefenbunker as a national historic site, and operating a Cold War Museum.

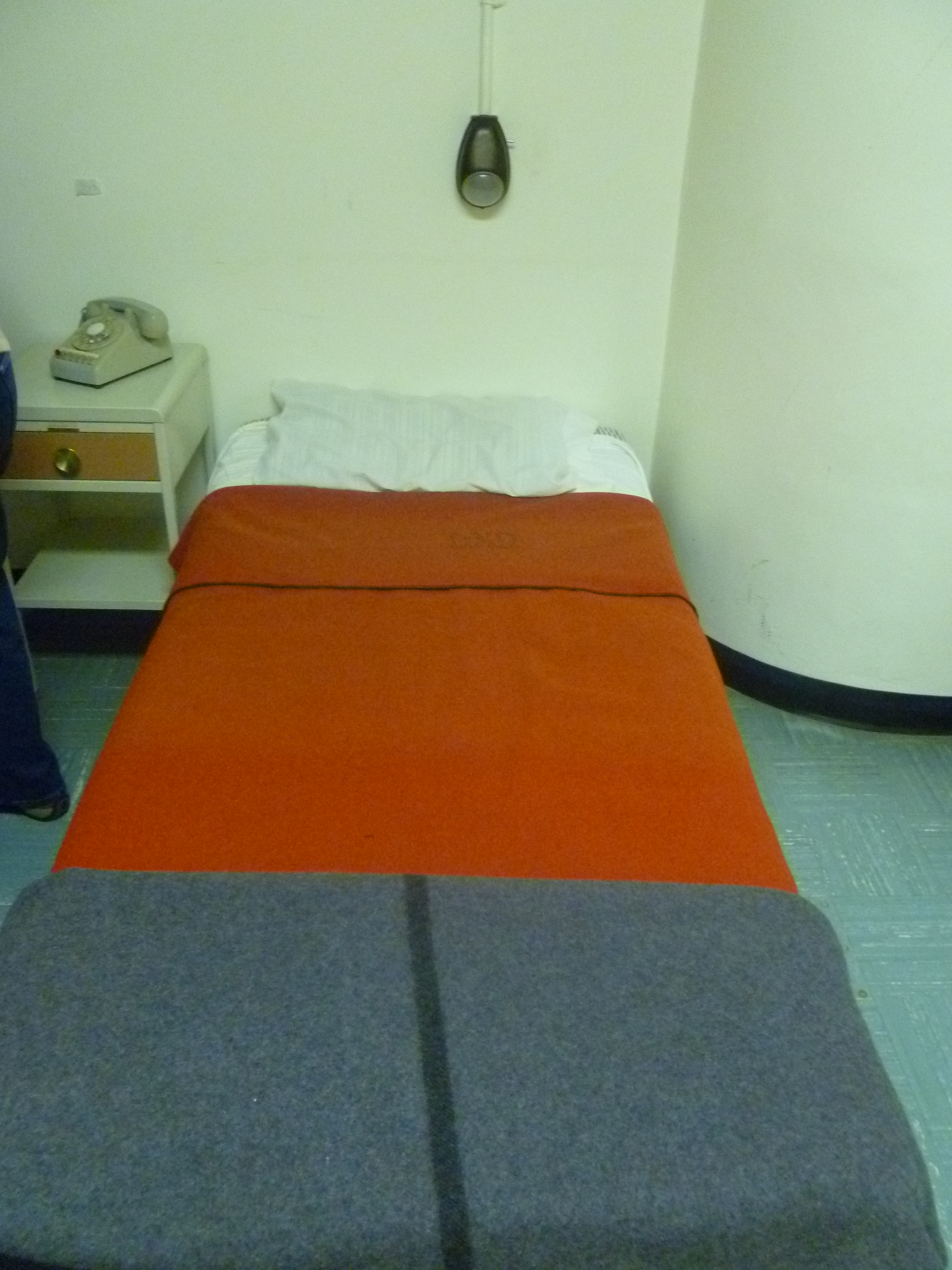
A re-creation of the very limited quarters provided for the Prime Minister. Military restrictions prohibited the Prime Minister from being accompanied by his wife and for this reason John Diefenbaker is rumoured to have refused to ever use the facility.

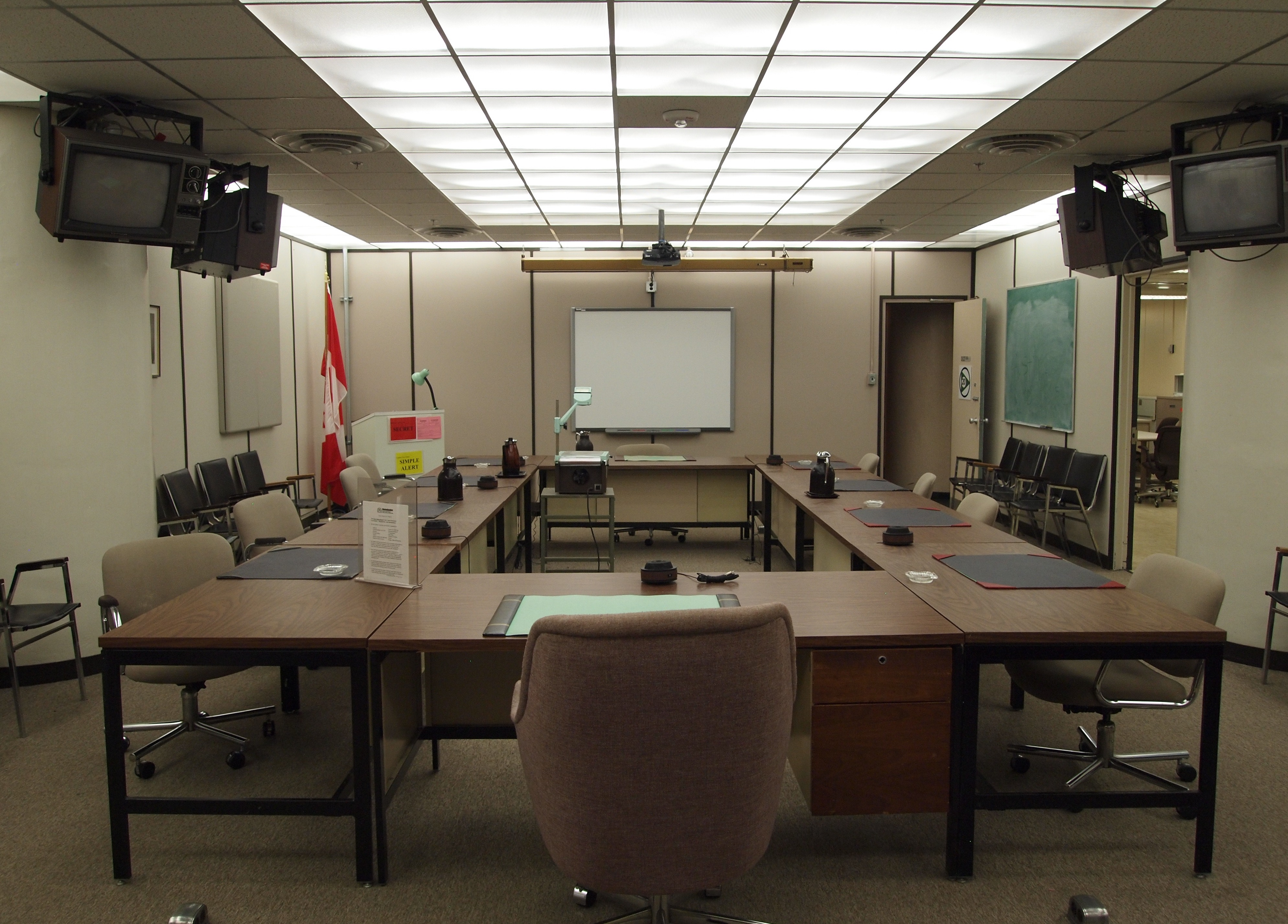
The main conference room inside the Diefenbunker to provide continuity of Canada's government activities that were legal and constitutional in case of a nuclear attack.

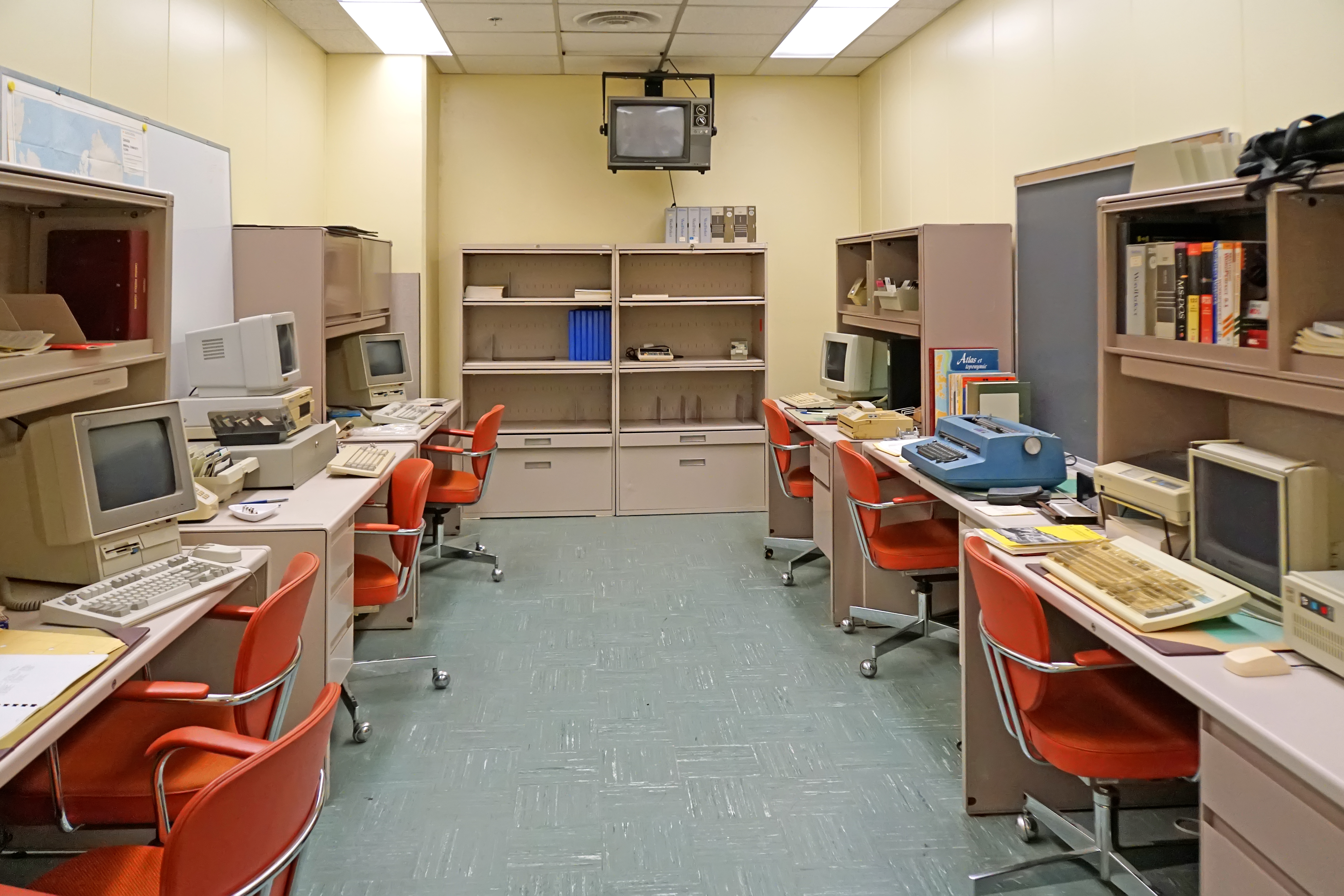
Another of the offices in the bunker.

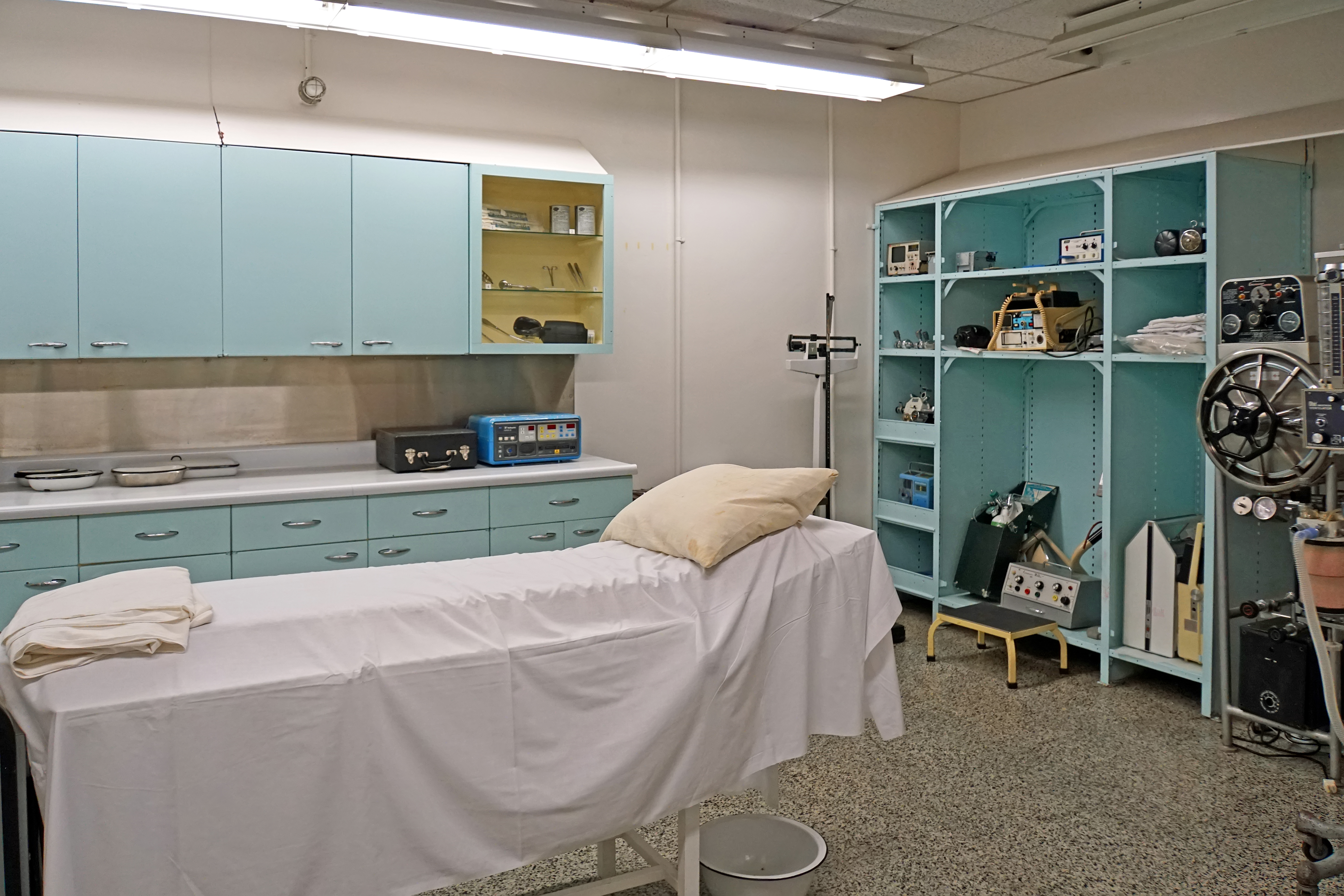
Medical center

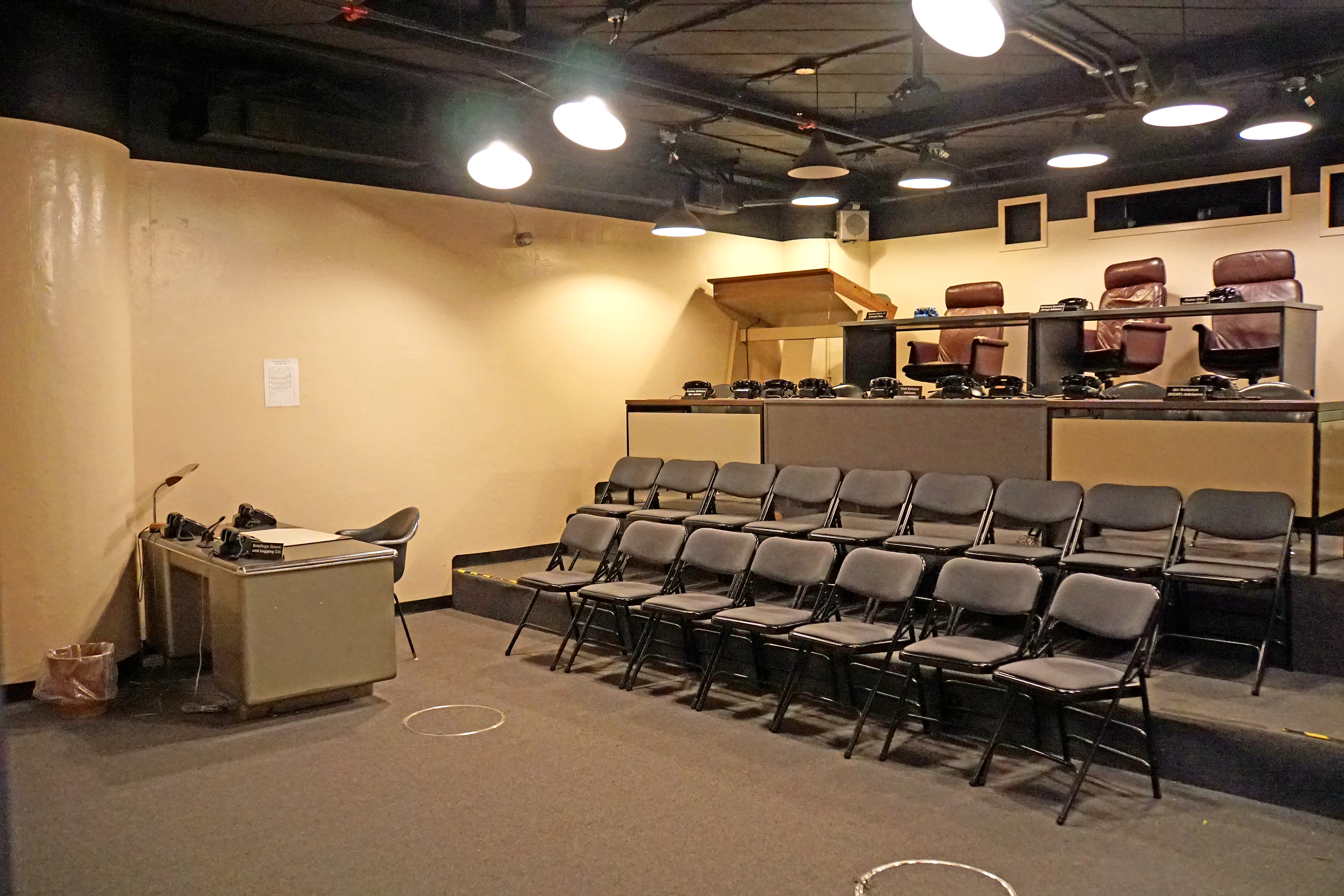
Federal Warning Centre & Military Information Centre

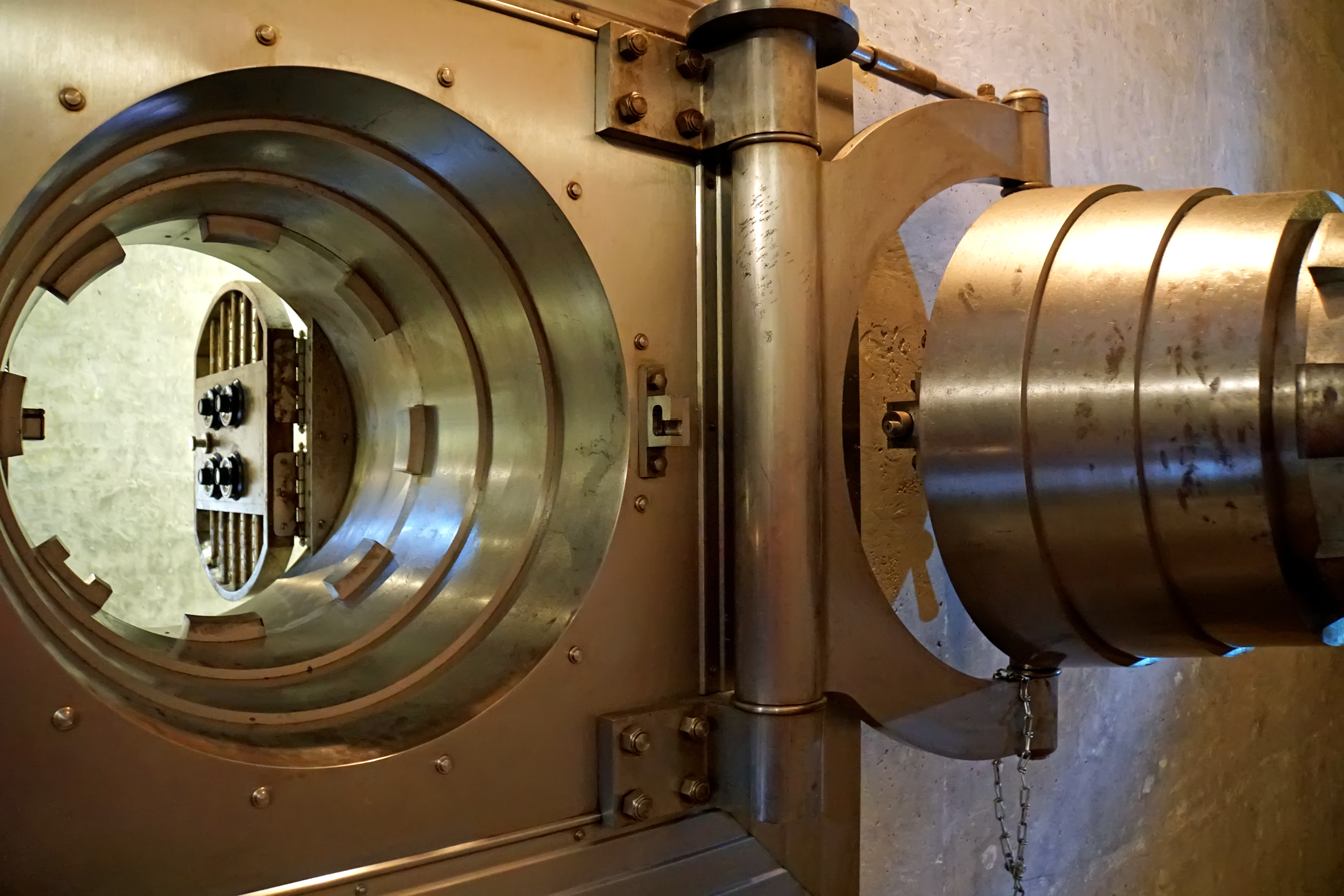
The Bank of Canada vault

== Collections and research ==
The Diefenbunker houses a collection of Cold War artifacts, an archive and a library, all of which are made available to researchers upon request, and to the general public through the exhibitions.

== Funding ==
The Diefenbunker: Canada's Cold War museum is a not-for-profit, charitable museum. It is funded privately; the main source of revenue for the museum comes from admission sales (approximately 75% of total revenue). The Diefenbunker actively applies for private, municipal, provincial and federal grants. The museum also relies on the generous support of the community through donations and sponsorship.

== Additional services ==
The Diefenbunker offers additional services on top of public tours. The museum has space available to rent both for events and storage. The decommissioned bunker has been used as a movie set on several occasions, including for The Sum of All Fears and Rulers of Darkness.

== See also ==
- Emergency Government Headquarters, a network of regional bunkers and radio stations across Canada.
- Central Government War Headquarters, British equivalent.
- Hack Green Secret Nuclear Bunker and Kelvedon Hatch Secret Nuclear Bunker, British RSG bunkers that were converted to museums in much the same way as the Diefenbunker.
