= CFS Carp Almonte Detachment =

Canadian military radio receiver station

Almonte Detachment
- Part of CFS Carp
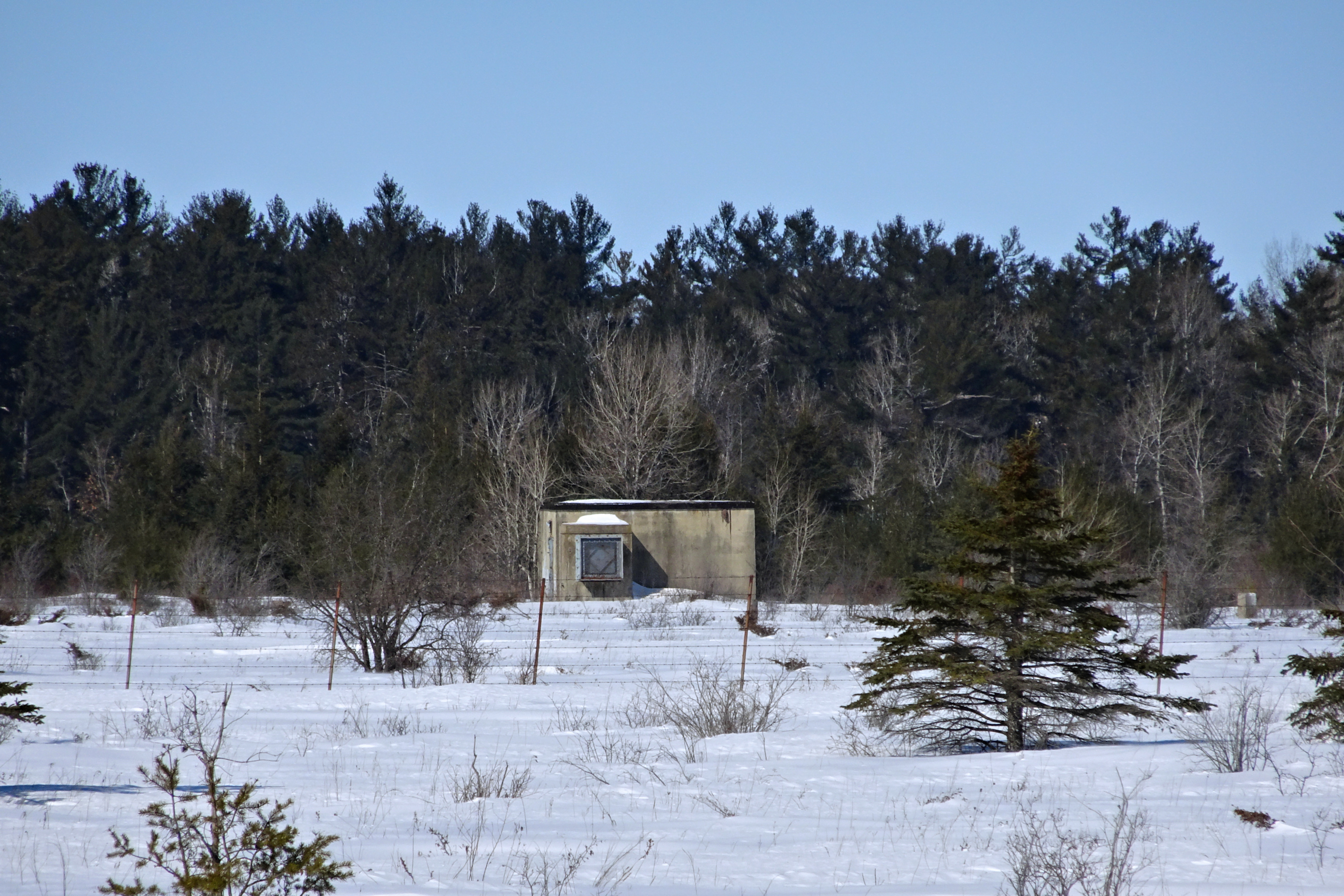
- Remnants of CFS Carp Almonte Det.

Site information
- Type: Military Radio Receiver Site
- Controlled by: Canadian Army

Location
- Location within Southern Ontario
- Coordinates: 45°15′43″N 76°09′08″W

Site history
- Built: 1962
- Built by: Canadian Army
- In use: 1962-1994

The Almonte Detachment was a military-operated radio communications receiver station linked by land line to CFS Carp located in Burnt Lands alvar off Lanark County Road 49 East of Almonte, Ontario, Canada. A second antenna receiver site was located further east near Dunrobin, Ontario; the Dunrobin Detachment. Both of these sites were linked to CFS Carp Richardson Detachment, which was a remote-operated transmitting site. CFS Carp Almonte Detachment was unmanned and the location primarily used as a remote antenna farm. After the end of the Cold War, CFS Carp was decommissioned and the antenna site was no longer needed.

The land is now part of the Burnt Lands Provincial Park.
