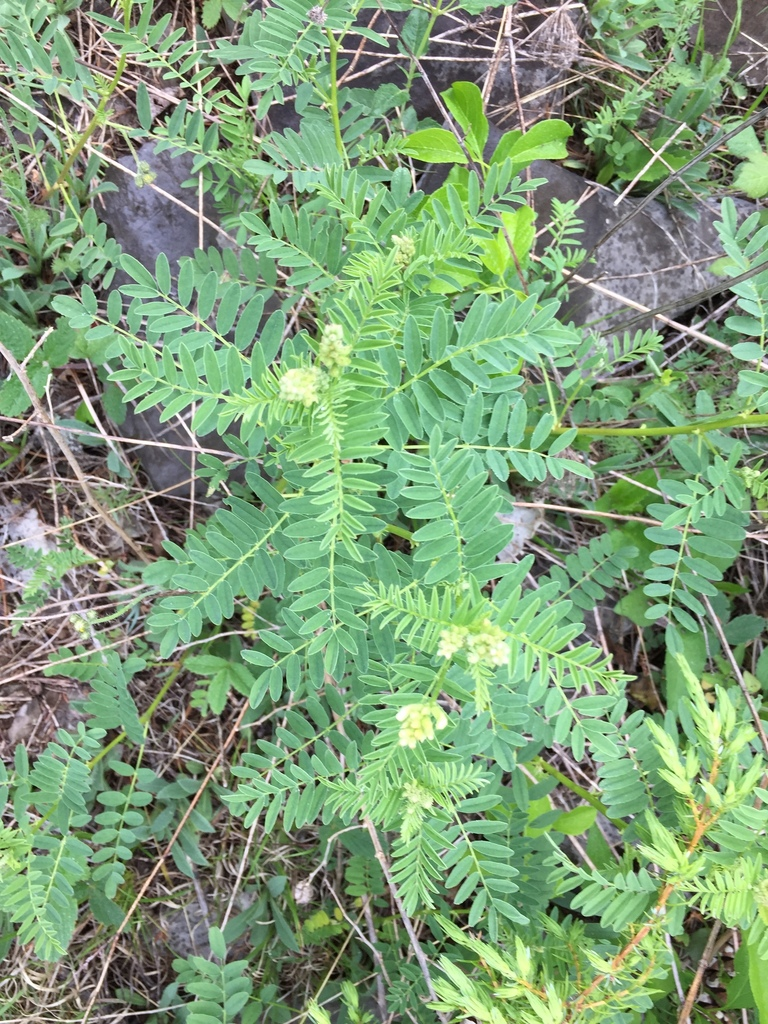

Conservation status
- Apparently Secure (NatureServe)

Scientific classification
- Kingdom: Plantae
- Clade: Tracheophytes
- Clade: Angiosperms
- Clade: Eudicots
- Clade: Rosids
- Order: Fabales
- Family: Fabaceae
- Subfamily: Faboideae
- Genus: Astragalus
- Species: A. neglectus

Binomial name
- Astragalus neglectus (Torr. & A.Gray) E. Sheld.

Synonyms
- Astragalus cooperi A.Gray; Phaca neglecta Torr. & A.Gray; Tragacantha neglecta (Torr. & A.Gray) Kuntze

= Astragalus neglectus =

Species of legume

Astragalus neglectus, or Cooper's milkvetch, is a species of flowering plant in the family Fabaceae native to northeastern North America.

== Description ==
Astragalus neglectus is a perennial, herbaceous plant growing 30 to 90 cm tall. The alternate, compound leaves have 11 to 25 leaflets. The 10 to 20 white or creamy flowers form a cluster arising from the upper leaf axils. The fruit is in the form of an inflated pod.

== Etymology ==
The first published description of the species (as Phaca neglecta) was in A Flora of North America by John Torrey and Asa Gray in 1838. The species is called Cooper's milkvetch after a William Cooper who discovered the plant described by Gray in 1856 as Astragalus cooperi (which ultimately was considered to be the same entity as A. neglectus).

== Distribution and habitat ==
The range of Astragalus neglectus is centred around the Great Lakes, but it also occurs from Manitoba and South Dakota east to Massachusetts and Virginia. It is rare throughout most of its range. It is found in wet to dry, open, often rocky habitats, especially those that are calcareous. Natural disturbance is required to maintain these open habitats.

== Conservation ==
Although ranked globally as apparently secure (G4), this species is considered to be a rare and potentially vulnerable species within most of the states and provinces where it occurs. It is classified as endangered in Wisconsin. It was formerly considered to be at risk in Minnesota but was delisted after the discovery of numerous new populations in the 1990s.

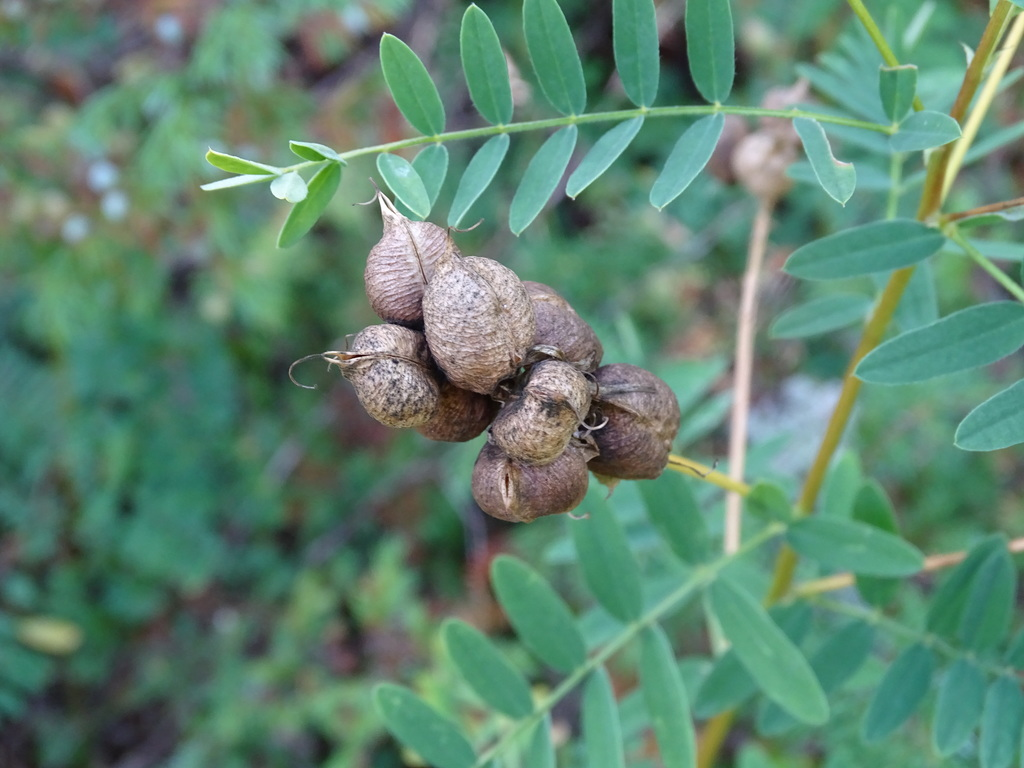
seedpods

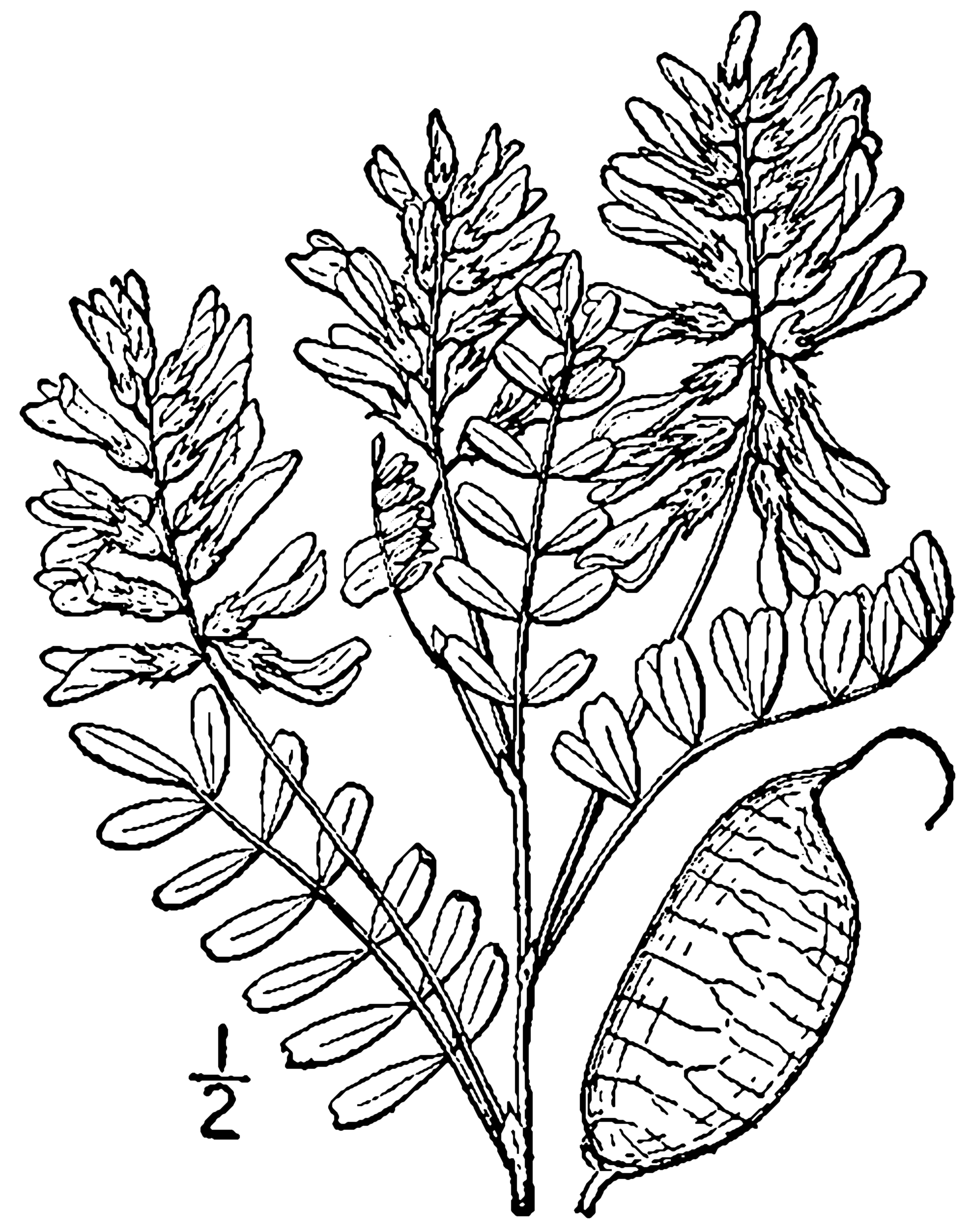
botanical illustration
