= CFS Carp Dunrobin Detachment =

Canadian military radio receiver station

Dunrobin Detachment
- Part of CFS Carp

Site information
- Type: Military Radio Receiver Site
- Controlled by: Canadian Army

Location
- Coordinates: 45.448407°N 76.047474°W

Site history
- Built: 1962
- Built by: Canadian Army
- In use: 1962-1994

CFS Carp Dunrobin Detachment

The Dunrobin Detachment was a military-operated radio communications receiver station linked by land line to CFS Carp located on the corner of Dunrobin Road and Vance's Side Road NW of Dunrobin, Ontario. A second antenna receiver site was located further West near Almonte, Ontario; the Almonte Detachment. The detachment was unmanned and the location primarily used as a remote antenna farm. After the end of the Cold War, CFS Carp was decommissioned and the antenna site was no longer needed.
