= Sherbrooke Hussars =

Canadian military unit

The Sherbrooke Hussars
- Active: 1965–present
- Country: Canada
- Branch: Canadian Army
- Type: Line cavalry
- Role: Armoured
- Size: One regiment
- Part of: 35 Canadian Brigade Group
- Garrison/HQ: 315, rue William, Sherbrooke (Québec), temporarily relocated to 700 Woodward Street, Sherbrooke, Quebec
- Mottos: In hoc signo stabilitas (Latin for 'In this sign, stability')
- March: "Regimental March of the Sherbrooke Hussars"
- Engagements: First World War; Second World War; War in Afghanistan
- Battle honours: See #Battle honours
- Website: canada.ca/en/army/corporate/2-canadian-division/the-sherbrooke-hussars.html
- Abbreviation: Sher H

The Sherbrooke Hussars is a Primary Reserve armoured regiment of the Royal Canadian Armoured Corps.

The regiment was formed in 1965 by amalgamation of the 7th/11th Hussars with the Sherbrooke Regiment (RCAC).

It perpetuates the Sherbrooke Fusilier Regiment of the Second World War.

== History ==
=== The Sherbrooke Regiment ===
The Sherbrooke Regiment was initially formed on 21 September 1866 in Melbourne, Quebec, as the Sherbrooke Battalion of Infantry, becoming the 53rd (Sherbrooke) Battalion in 1867. The regiment perpetuates the Frontier Light Infantry as well as the 1st and 4th battalions of the Eastern Township District (1812–1815) from the War of 1812. As a result, the regiment carries the battle honour "Defence of Canada – 1812–1815", in recognition of the service rendered by the Frontier Light Infantry at the Battle of Lacolle Mills (1814).

On 22 March 1867 it was reorganized as two separate battalions designated the 53rd Melbourne Battalion of Infantry and the 54th Sherbrooke Battalion of Infantry. It was redesignated as the 53rd Sherbrooke Battalion of Infantry on 10 May 1867 and then the 53rd Sherbrooke Regiment on 8 May 1900.

The regiment provided volunteers for the 12th Battalion, CEF, in 1914. The following year, it provided men to the 117th (Eastern Townships) Battalion, CEF. After proceeding overseas the 117th was broken up to provide reinforcements for several other Canadian units serving France.

In 1920, the Sherbrooke Regiment was reformed with two battalions – the 1st Battalion perpetuated the traditions of the 117th CEF. Following the Great War, the regiment was renamed The Sherbrooke Regiment on 29 March 1920 and re-roled as a machine gun battalion as The Sherbrooke Regiment (MG) on 15 December 1936.

In 1940, parts of the regiment amalgamated with Les Fusiliers de Sherbrooke to form the Sherbrooke Fusilier Regiment (27th Canadian Armoured Regiment). Initially an infantry regiment, it was converted to an armoured regiment, later part of 2nd Canadian Armoured Brigade. The Sherbrooke Regiment remained in Canada and trained as infantry.

After the end of the Second World War, The Sherbrooke Regiment re-roled as armour, becoming the 12th Armoured Regiment (Sherbrooke Regiment), The Sherbrooke Regiment (RCAC). In 1965, it amalgamated with the 7th/11th Hussars to become The Sherbrooke Hussars.

The camp flag of the Sherbrooke Hussars

=== 7th/11th Hussars ===
The 7th/11th Hussars was formed in 1936 through the amalgamation of the 7th Hussars and 11th Hussars. In 1940, 400 men of the 7th/11th Hussars were mobilized as infantry with the 1st Battalion, Royal Rifles of Canada. It was redesignated the 2nd (Reserve) Regiment, 7th/11th Hussars on 27 February 1941. The regiment itself became the 16th (Reserve) Armoured Regiment, before being disbanded in 1943, with its personnel absorbed by the 5th Canadian Armoured Division of I Canadian Corps.

Brigade Headquarters of 5 Canadian Armoured Brigade was nicknamed "Headquarters Squadron (7th/11th Hussars)", and saw service in the Italian and Northwest Europe campaigns. Two HQ Sqn (7th/11th Hussars) members were made Members of the Order of the British Empire for their wartime service: Captain Robert Rutherford was brigade reconnaissance officer, and Squadron Serjeant Major Cecil Raven was de facto HQ regimental sergeant major.

In 1946, the regiment was raised again in Canada, as 16th Reconnaissance Regiment (7th/11th Hussars), RCAC, on 1 April 1946, redesignated the 7th/11th Hussars (16th Reconnaissance Regiment) on 4 February 1949. It converted to armour as the 7th/11th Hussars (16th Armoured Regiment) on 1 September 1954 and finally the 7th/11th Hussars on 19 May 1958.

On 15 February 1965 it was amalgamated with The Sherbrooke Regiment (RCAC) to form the Sherbrooke Hussars.

=== Lineage chart ===
Lineage chart

1812 | Frontier Light Infy | 1st and 4th Bns, Eastern Townships District
1815 | Disbanded | Disbanded
1856 | Independent infy and rifle coys
1866 | Sherbrooke Bn of Infy | Independent infy coys
1867 | 53rd Sherbrooke Bn of Infy | 58th "Compton" Bn of Infy
1867 | 53rd Melbourne Bn of Infy | 54th Sherbrooke Bn of Infy
1867 | 53rd Sherbrooke Bn of Infy | 54th "Richmond" Bn of Infy
1900 | 53rd Sherbrooke Regt | 54th Richmond Regt | 58th Compton Regt
1903 | 11th Hussars | 7th Hussars
1914 | 5th Regt, CMR, CEF
1915 | 117th "Overseas" Bn, CEF | 5th CMR Bn, CEF
1917 | Absorbed by 23rd Reserve Bn
1920 | Disbanded
1920 | 1st Bn (117th Bn, CEF), The Sherbrooke Regt | 2nd Bn, (Note: Reserve) The Sherbrooke Regt | 1st Regt, 11th Hussars | 2nd Regt, 11th Hussars | 1st Regt, 7th Hussars | 2nd Regt, 7th Hussars
1936 | Disbanded | Disbanded | Disbanded
1936 | The Sherbrooke Regt (MG) | 7th/11th Hussars (Note: Perpetuates 5th Canadian Mounted Rifles Battalion)
1939 | No. 1 General Base Depot, CASF
1940 | Disbanded | The Sherbrooke Fusiliers Regt, CASF
1940 | 1st Bn, The Sherbrooke Fusiliers Regt, CASF
1940 | 1st Bn, The Sherbrooke Fusilier Regt, CASF
1941 | The Sherbrooke Regt | 2nd Canadian Armd Bde HQ Sqn (7th/11th Hussars), CASF | 2nd (Reserve) Regt, 7th/11th Hussars
1941 | 2nd (Reserve) Bn, The Sherbrooke Regt | 16th (Reserve) Armd Regt (7th/11th Hussars)
1942 | 27th Armd Regt (The Sherbrooke Fusiliers Regt), CAC, CASF
1943 | Absorbed by HQ, 2nd Canadian Armd Bde
1945 | 27th Armd Regt (The Sherbrooke Fusiliers Regt), RCAC, CASF
1946 | Disbanded | 12th Armd Regt (Sherbrooke Regt), RCAC | 16th Recce Regt (7th/11th Hussars), RCAC
1949 | The Sherbrooke Regt (12th Armd Regt) | 7th/11th Hussars (16th Recce Regt)
1954 | 7th/11th Hussars (16th Armd Regt)
1958 | The Sherbrooke Regt (RCAC) | 7th/11th Hussars
1965 | The Sherbrooke Hussars
2012 | Perpetuates War of 1812 units

=== Sherbrooke Hussars ===
The guidon of the Sherbrooke Hussars

The Canadian Army doctrine changed in the 1950s from mobilizing units in Canada for overseas service, to maintaining standing forces in Europe. As a North Atlantic Treaty Organisation signatory, Canada's focus was to support first the 27th Infantry Brigade in Germany and later 4th Canadian Mechanized Brigade. The role of reserve units changed to training individual soldiers to augment the regular force.

On 15 February 1965, the 7th/11th Hussars amalgamated with The Sherbrooke Regiment (RCAC) to form the current regiment. The Sherbrooke Regiment's Sherman tanks were returned to stores. Regimental headquarters was established in Sherbrooke, with 'A' and 'B' Squadrons. Personnel from outlying areas were encouraged to commute for training.

On 5 July 1967, Queen Elizabeth II presented a new guidon on Parliament Hill in the presence of thousands of spectators. An editorial in The Sherbrooke Daily Record declared it a, "... a proud moment, too, for the people of Sherbrooke whose heritage includes the distinguished exploits of this military unit." Likewise in the spirit of Centennial projects that marked the federation's 100th birthday was the Sherbrooke Hussars' Centennial Guard. Throughout the Eastern Townships in August, a 35-man platoon of soldiers performed 1860s-style Fort Henry Guard-inspired drill with period Snider–Enfield rifles and bayonets.

During the decades that followed, members of the Sherbrooke Hussars deployed on Exercise Reforger 'call-outs' to Germany, including a formed Jeep light armoured reconnaissance troop attached to the 8th Canadian Hussars. Other operational deployment included individuals on United Nations missions in Middle East UNEF and UNDOF as support trades, such as drivers, Cyprus UNFICYP as peacekeepers, and extensively in the Former Yugoslavia UNPROFOR. A member of the regiment, Corporal David Galvin, attached to 12^{e}RBC, was killed when his Cougar armoured car rolled over on 29 November 1993. Several members of the regiment served in Afghanistan, including at least one soldier who was wounded by an improvised explosive device. Although individual contributions were significant, the regiment did not meet the detailed criteria for the Afghanistan theatre honours. Elsewhere, personnel served in Haiti following the 2010 earthquake.

Reserve units in Canada face constant challenges of personnel attraction and retention. Often an employer will be reluctant to allow a reservist to leave their job to attend extended training courses or an operational deployment. One effort to reward cooperative employers has been through public recognition through the Canadian Forces Liaison Council. In 2005, the Most Supportive Employer in Quebec was the federal Department of Citizenship and Immigration on behalf of their employee, Captain Simon Hallé of the Sherbrooke Hussars. Routine training includes an element of personal risk. While on a reconnaissance exercise in the Bishopton and Bury area in October 1987, Cpl Denis Letellier died instantly in a road accident with his Iltis Jeep. During a road movement taking headquarters personnel to visit troops occupying an observation post screen, his vehicle slid onto the shoulder of the road and overturned. His memory is sustained with an annual trophy for the best Corporal in the unit.

National Defence budgets have always set the tone for training and recruiting tempo. For example, in April 2010, both the Sherbrooke Hussars and the Fusiliers de Sherbrooke were required to reduce their operating funds by 40% in the middle of their training year.

Discussion of how to better integrate reserve units with the regular force (Reg F) is not new. The 2017 Strong, Secure and Engaged (SSE) policy directed the CAF to evolve the Reserves from a mobilization structure into a fully integrated force. This led to the 2019 Strengthening the Army Through the Reserves (StAR) project, which assigned the Sher H a mission task to acquire chemical, biological, radiological and nuclear (CBRN) detection expertise. Other units received tasks across a wide military spectrum, such as force protection, convoy escorts, Arctic response company groups, and territorial battalion groups. Following the disruptions caused by the COVID-19 pandemic in Canada, StAR evolved into the 2020 Canadian Army Modernization Strategy (CAMS), then the One Army, which became the 2024 Our North, Strong and Free: A Renewed Vision for Canada’s Defence, and then the army's Inflection Point 2025. Each one analysed what the army is and what the army should be. From Inflection Point 2025, the 120 Primary Reserve units will be grouped with the Canadian Rangers into a Defence of Canada Division. This is separate from the Regular Force–centred heavy Manoeuvre Division, Support Division and Training Division. As of March 2026, the Sher H's specific role had not been announced.

The Sherbrooke Hussars has used a variety of operational vehicles over the years:

- Cougar AVGP (Armoured Vehicle General Purpose);
- Canadian-made GMC M135 2 1/2-ton Cargo ("Deuce and a Half");
- Canadian-made Dodge M37 3/4-ton truck;
- M38A1 1/4-ton truck, the M151A2 1/4-ton truck; and the Volkswagen Iltis 1/4-ton truck for wheeled reconnaissance training;
- Canadian-made M35 series 2 1/2-ton 6×6 cargo truck known as the MLVW;
- Canadian-produced, standard transmission, 12v, 4x4, 1-ton Dodge Power Wagon W200 trucks differing slightly from the American Commercial Utility Cargo Vehicle series;
- various 1 1/4-ton GM commercial vehicles Commercial Utility Cargo Vehicle;

The current service vehicle is the Mercedes G-Wagen 1/2-ton truck, and the operational support vehicle is the MilCots commercial pattern extended cab 4x4 truck. There are six vehicles assigned for the echelon as fuel can hauler, ammo truck, squadron sergeant major's resupply and canteen, first-line mechanic, and administration sergeant in place of the retired LSVW. Since the fall of 2017, the TAPV has been the main training attraction, 18-ton Textron Tactical Armoured Patrol Vehicle.

Throughout its existence, the regiment perpetuates its Eastern Township roots as a bilingual unit in the Army Reserves. Since the arrival of the TAPV, training has concentrated on cavalry duties such as mounted reconnaissance, convoy escort and vehicle checkpoint establishment using the TAPV and G-Wagen.

== Perpetuations ==
=== War of 1812 ===
- Frontier Light Infantry and 1st and 4th battalions of the Eastern Township District (1812–1815)

=== Great War ===
- 5th Battalion, Canadian Mounted Rifles, CEF is perpetuated by The Sherbrooke Hussars, through the 7th/11th Hussars as explained below
- 117th (Eastern Townships) Battalion, CEF is perpetuated by The Sherbrooke Hussars
- 163rd Battalion (French-Canadian), CEF is perpetuated by Les Fusiliers de Sherbrooke

== Eastern Townships' military legacies ==
The guidon of The Sherbrooke Hussars has, at its centre bottom, the badge of the Royal Rifles of Canada to denote the honorary distinction for reinforcing the Royal Rifles during their operation in Hong Kong.

== Formation of Sherbrooke Fusilier Regiment ==
The Sherbrooke Regiment mobilized the No. 1 General Base Depot, Canadian Active Service Force, on 1 September 1939, which embarked for Britain on 25 January 1940 where it provided guards for vulnerable points until disbanded on 6 July 1940. The city-based regiment then, in conjunction with Les Fusiliers de Sherbrooke, mobilized The Sherbrooke Fusilier Regiment, CASF, for active service on 24 May 1940. In later years, a well-regarded senior officer described the Fusiliers in those years as perhaps the most unusual regiment in the army. While it later became entirely English-speaking, at that time it had French-speaking Catholics in two companies and English-speaking Protestants in the other two. The adjutant was Jewish. The commander could not speak French while at least one of the senior officers could not speak English.

It was redesignated as the "1st Battalion, The Sherbrooke Fusilier Regiment, CASF", on 7 November 1940, then as the "1st Battalion, The Sherbrooke Fusilier Regiment, CASF", on 15 November 1940 and upon conversion to an armoured regiment, as the "27th Armoured Regiment (The Sherbrooke Fusilier Regiment), CAC, CASF", on 26 January 1942 and "27th Armoured Regiment (The Sherbrooke Fusilier Regiment), RCAC, CASF" on 2 August 1945. In the case of the overseas unit 'Fusilier' is always in the singular. The regiment served overseas initially in Newfoundland from 13 August 1941 to 15 February 1942, and embarked for Britain on 27 October 1942. After selection as a tank regiment, The "Sherbrookes" as they called themselves became part of the 2nd Canadian Armoured Brigade.

Rather than detail all other units raised in the Sherbrooke area, it is worth highlighting the 2nd (Reserve) Battalion, The Sherbrooke Regiment which was designated on 7 November 1940. Across Canada, Non-Permanent Active Militia units formed a recruiting base and community focus. For example, during the Great War (1914–1918) replacement soldiers were formed into new battalions for the front. LCol Bertram Dawson Lyon (1905–1986) was already a long-serving Militia officer when he was named Commanding Officer in 1943. Typical of the expectations of the community, he supported his family through his business and also served in the Militia. When war broke out, he volunteered for active service with the Sherbrooke Regiment, and shipped out for England with the 27th Armoured. He was seriously injured in training in 1942, and repatriated to Canada as unfit for duty. However, his experience was put to use as Commanding Officer of the 2nd (Reserve) Battalion from 1943 to 1946.

Lieutenant-Colonel Melville "Mel" Burgoyne Kennedy Gordon was commanding officer from 1943 to 1945. He graduated from the University of Toronto in 1926, and was in their Canadian Officers' Training Corps from 1922 to 1924. He was commissioned as a lieutenant to the Governor General's Body Guard in 1924, where he served until 1928. That year he changed affiliation to the Princess Louise Dragoon Guards in Ottawa, where he rose to captain and major. From 1931 Gordon practiced law in Ontario and Quebec, and returned to the legal profession after the war. In 1941 as a trained major, Gordon was posted to the 12th Armoured Regiment (Three Rivers Regiment) at Camp Borden, Ontario. He was officer commanding "B" Squadron in Canada and in England until January 1943. At that time, Gordon was promoted to lieutenant-colonel and given command of the 27th Armoured Regiment (Sherbrooke Fusilier Regiment).

Not every soldier who enrolled in the SFR in 1940 was necessarily still on strength on 6 June 1944. With each change of arm of service from infantry to tank to armoured, the establishment expanded or contracted. Individual soldiers were examined by selection boards for their suitability or willingness to serve in the new role. Commanders paid close attention to medical standards to remove soldiers and officers who were unfit or unlikely to fully recover from accidents or illness. Some men preferred to stay in the infantry left the unit. In other cases, officers, NCOs and man whose language skills limited their employment in what became an English-speaking unit were sent to Depot. In return, replacements were taken on strength continuously, and trained in the new skills. The cycle was almost continuous.

Similar to the expectation on the soldiers and officers to excel, there was command pressure on the unit to form into a competent functioning and efficient fighting regiment. Virtually nonstop visits, inspections, testing, competitions, training courses and schools, and interminable exercises drilled the lessons into all ranks. For example, there were timed contests to load the tanks onto the LSTs and improvements were identified, such as when it was most practical to drive the tanks in reverse and who should give directions. In the beginning the exercises were learn-as-you-go with debriefs and learning conferences in the evenings or afterwards. Anyone called out for failing to improve could expect to be relieved or replaced. In the UK, neutral umpires monitored exercises and interjected changes or casualties to test reactions.

== Armoury and training areas ==
Extracted from List of armouries in Canada

| Site | Date(s) | Designated | Location | Description | Image |
|---|---|---|---|---|---|
| William Street Armoury 315 William Street, Sherbrooke, Quebec | 1908, although parts of the central structure date from the late 1830s | Canada's Register of Historic Places; Recognized – 1991 Register of the Government of Canada Heritage Buildings | Sherbrooke, Quebec | Housing the Sherbrooke Hussars and 52 Field Ambulance. The front facing portion is the former Sherbrooke Court House, convenient to the adjacent former Winter Street Prison. The layout is a central hallway with two former courtrooms behind the front façade, offices beyond, quartermaster in the basement and a mess on the entire second floor. A large steel gable-roof drill hall is nested behind the offices, and is accessible from a large door on Winter Street. | |

Shortly after its formation, the 53rd Battalion began looking for a site for its training ground. In 1867, the battalion purchased a 1.6-hectare (4-acre) plot of land for $2,000 at the corner of Moore and Queen Streets (now Champ-de-Mars Park). A drill shed was built at the intersection of Montréal and William Streets.

The old courthouse became the William Street Armoury, was purchased on 31 August 1903 by the City of Sherbrooke from the province, moreso to prevent loss of the location to other development and then sold it to a benevolent speculator, Frederick Oscar Warren Loomis. A year later, even while interested parties were urging the federal government to take over the courthouse, land at Belvedere and Minto Streets was acquired from the British American Land Company for what became the Fusiliers de Sherbrooke’s new armoury. In June 1905, expansion plans for the William Street site were offered and rejected by the federal government as too expensive. A high-level delegation from Quebec Command visited William Street in January 1907, and once again recommended the site as a second armoury for the city. By 1908 the 53rd Regiment, the 22nd Field Battery (one of three batteries in a newly reorganized 7th Brigade Artillery). During that same year, the 15th “Shefford” Battery was combined with two new units, the 22nd Battery from Sherbrooke, as well as a 70-charge ammunition column. In 1912, the 35th Battery from Coaticook completed the lineup, and No. 6 Company Royal Canadian Army Service Corps were already using existing parts of 315 William Street for administration and training. That year the federal government was convinced to buy the site for $10,000. That summer, the Minister of Militia and Defence, Colonel Sam Hughes, approved repair and renovation plans, as well as construction of an 80-by-150-foot (24 m × 46 m) covered drill hall behind the main structure. The cost was to be between $20,000 and $30,000. For the period 1909 to 1914, all Militia units shared the then-new Belvedere Street Armoury and some nearby rented facilities until William Street was delivered in March 1914. The overcrowding was not always beneficial, and most officers of the 54th Regiment had sped up the move by resigning en masse in September 1913. The 53rd’s first drill was conducted in 7 April 1914.

The reconstructed building layout was an H, with the crossbar forming a short central hallway and the drill hall across the back. In the 1970s the drill hall once had hardwood flooring, which was replaced with concrete. The basement level had offices and classrooms, including the band room on the left. The 52^{e} Compangie Medicale had the lower level, along with the heating plant. For many years, there was a 2-storey caretaker’s apartment on the extreme right end of the front façade, which the 52^{e} eventually took over. The three messes were, junior ranks to the right, senior NCOs to the left including the old jail cells as the bar, and the officers' mess occupying the third level. The main floor and lower level of the rear legs of the H were offices, an indoor range, and quartermaster stores for the Sherbrooke Hussars. Classrooms and other spaces led off the main parade floor, for use by two cadet corps. The most dramatic feature of the drill hall was a tall painted replica of the armoured regiment’s cap badge high on the left or south wall.

On 6 May 1950 the armoury suffered a serious fire throughout the central section. Irreplaceable trophies and equipment was destroyed, including road signs of the various towns and villages liberated by the Sherbrooke Fusilier Regiment in 1944 and 1945. To sustain training, as a temporary replacement, on 17 November 1950 the 7th/11th Hussars and the Sherbrooke Regiment acquired "McBain's Farm", acknowledging its former owner Henry McBain, at the corner of Hamel Road South and Quebec Route 220 in Saint-Elie-d'Orford. Hangars and a hardstand were built for the regiment's four Sherman tanks. Its open spaces, overgrown farm fields, sand pits, brush and forested areas provided excellent off-road opportunities for trainee drivers. Over the years many Basic Training courses dug defensive trench lines and waited in the gloom of dawn to repel blank-firing attacks, and practised compass marches through the swamps. In the late 2000s, when land values had made McBain's attractive to developers, a land swap was made for a 73-hectare open field 8 km further west along Quebec Route 220, named Rutherford to acknowledge 5 CMR First War Victoria Cross winner Charles Rutherford. In the 2020s, it is managed as a field training area by the Regular Force garrison at Farnham.

The question of maintenance on the William Street Armoury was asked of Prime Minister Justin Trudeau during his town-hall visits in January 2017. In mid-February, the MP for Sherbrooke, Pierre-Luc Dusseault, sent a letter to the Minister of National Defence defending the institution of both armouries in Sherbrooke as historic buildings deserving of conservation, and signalling that the William Street Armoury was apparently in the poorest state of repair. Still in February 2017, the headlines declared, "Le manège William disparaîtra d'ici dix ans" translated as, "The William Street Armoury will disappear within ten years, and all 225 members for the Sherbrooke Hussars and 52^{e} Ambulance de campagne will move to Belvédère Street."

In December 2017, the outgoing Sherbrooke Hussars commanding officer, Lieutenant-Colonel L-B Dutil, said that moving the four regiments to one armoury was unlikely to proceed, "With the growth of the reserves, with the new vehicles that have arrived, and with other factors, it means that this option may not be the best, ... (translated from French)." He also mentioned a visit in December 2017 by the Minister of National Defence, who acknowledged rushing a decision was not in anyone's interests.

Media in mid-June 2021 reported the William Street Armoury was found unsafe and would shortly be condemned. The two occupying units were warned they had one year to move, which was expedited to a few months. This news came only months after orders in March to close the Belvédère Street armoury, home of the Fusiliers de Sherbrooke and 35 Signal Regiment who had only two months' notice to evacuate. All four reserve units in Sherbrooke were suddenly homeless. By late 2021, both armouries had been evacuated and barricaded, citing unsafe conditions within. Public and media interest in the buildings' future remained high. Concerns were raised that the four units would eventually be housed in a single facility outside the central core of Sherbrooke. Following the urgent evacuation of the William Street Armoury, the regiment moved to temporary quarters at 700 Woodward Street.

| Site | Date(s) | Designated | Location | Description | Image |
|---|---|---|---|---|---|
| 700 Woodward Street, Sherbrooke, Quebec | Unknown, likely 1960s or 1970s | | Sherbrooke, Quebec | The structure is a leased industrial building with a wide front lawn and fenced outdoor parking, housing The Sherbrooke Hussars, les Fusiliers de Sherbrooke, the Sherbrooke-based elements of 35 Signal Regiment, and 52 Field Ambulance. | |

On 2 December 2022, Minister of National Defence Anita Anand announced a two-prong effort. The Department of National Defence will restore the William Street Armoury and renovate Belvédère Street. Community members reaffirmed the importance of the building as downtown architecture and integral to the sense of place felt by reservists. Anand stated the department would work with heritage consultants and the City of Sherbrooke to restore William Street in a manner that preserved its historical value. She explained an additional or third location would be acquired to accommodate the increasing needs of Sherbrooke's reservists.

By October 2024, the principles for restoring William Street became clearer. The front facade will be saved as part of a project to preserve its significant heritage value, while the deteriorating sections behind will be partially demolished to make way for new developments. The reporter noted, with over 115 years of continuous military presence at the William Armoury, the site is intertwined with the city’s identity, both judicially and militarily. A third new armoury is planned for downtown to accommodate the growing needs of Sherbrooke’s regiments.

On 20 March 2025, the federal government announced the launch of the design phase for the Sherbrooke Armouries recapitalization project. As part of a change order to the modified design build contract already in place with Pomerleau Inc. of Quebec, a portion of the contract will finalize designs and begin early construction for renovating the Colonel-Gaëtan-Côté (Belvédère Street) and restoring the William Street armouries. It will also include the design work for the third site once the land acquisition process is completed by DND. Optimistically, activity was expected to begin in early 2025 and take approximately two years to complete. The subsequent construction of the armouries is slated to begin in 2027.

In October 2025, Sherbrooke media noted the mayor and council's reluctance to accept National Defence's request to locate the third armoury in a high-traffic commercial area in the northwest of the city. In their view, a predominately vehicle storage and warehouse type facility was a poor fit for their zoning and development plans.

== Alliances ==
- United Kingdom – The Queen's Royal Hussars (Queen's Own and Royal Irish)
- United Kingdom – The Royal Anglian Regiment

== Battle honours ==
Battle honours in small capitals are for large operations and campaigns and those in lowercase are for more specific battles. Bold type indicates honours authorized to be emblazoned on the regimental guidon.

War of 1812
Defence of Canada – 1812–1815 – Défense du Canada
The non-emblazonable honorary distinction Defence of Canada – 1812–1815 – Défense du Canada
First World War
- Mount Sorrel
- **Somme, 1916**
- Flers–Courcelette
- Ancre Heights
- **Arras, 1917, '18**
- **Vimy, 1917**
- **Hill 70**
- **Ypres, 1917**
- **Passchendaele**
- **Amiens**
- Scarpe, 1918
- Hindenburg Line
- Canal du Nord
- **Cambrai, 1918**
- **Valenciennes**
- Sambre
- **France and Flanders, 1915–18**
Second World War
- **Normandy Landing**
- **Authie**
- **Caen**
- The Orne
- **Bourguébus Ridge**
- Faubourg de Vaucelles
- St. André-sur-Orne
- **Falaise**
- Falaise Road
- Clair Tizon
- The Laison
- Antwerp–Turnhout Canal
- **The Scheldt**
- The Lower Maas
- **The Rhineland**
- The Hochwald
- **Xanten**
- **The Rhine**
- Emmerich–Hoch Elten
- Zutphen, Deventer
- **North-West Europe, 1944–1945**

Honorary distinction: the badge of the Royal Rifles of Canada, with the year-date 1941, was awarded as an honorary distinction to the 7th/11th Hussars for significantly reinforcing the Royal Rifles of Canada during Battle of Hong Kong

The regiment did not contribute sufficient forces to meet the minimum level of 20 per cent of effective strength to qualify for the theatre honour “Afghanistan".

When the William Street Armoury was closed in 2022 pending an architectural review, the regimental guidon which is normally kept under glass in the Officer's Mess, was displayed at Sherbrooke City Hall.

== Honorary appointments ==
Honorary colonels

- The Sherbrooke Regiment and The Sherbrooke Hussars
  - Colonel Edward Bruen Worthington, CMG VD 1937
  - Colonel (Brigadier-General) J.H. Price, CC, OBE, MC, ED 1968
  - Colonel Douglas Bradley
  - Colonel Thomas Garfield Gould, MC
  - Colonel J. Garneau, CD 2006
  - Colonel (Lieutenant-General retired) Paul Addy, CMM, CD
  - Colonel (Maître) Sylvestre
  - Colonel David Rothschild
- The 7th/11th Hussars
  - Major-General the Right Honourable J. E. B. Seely, CB, CMG, DSO 1920

Honorary lieutenant-colonels

- The Sherbrooke Regiment and The Sherbrooke Hussars
  - Lieutenant-Colonel C.J. McCuaig 1913
  - Lieutenant-Colonel E.B. Worthington 1926
  - Lieutenant-Colonel A.A. Munster 1937
  - Lieutenant-Colonel Alfred Lloyd Penhale 1958
  - Lieutenant-Colonel (Brigadier-General) J.H. Price, CC, OBE, MC, ED
  - Lieutenant-Colonel D. Bradley
  - Lieutenant-Colonel D. Ross
  - Lieutenant-Colonel J. Garneau CD 1991
  - Lieutenant-Colonel Jacques F. Girardin CD 2006
  - Lieutenant-Colonel Jean Vaillancourt
  - Lieutenant-Colonel (Maître) Sylvestre
  - Lieutenant-Colonel David Rothschild
- The 11th Hussars
  - Colonel (Brigadier-General the Honourable) C.M. Nelles, CMG, RO 1921

== Commanding officers and regimental sergeant majors ==
Commanding officers

- Lieutenant Colonel John Blue (not to be confused with another serving officer Harry Blue)
- Lieutenant Colonel Jack Hawkins
- Lieutenant Colonel Jim Strickland (1967)
- Lieutenant Colonel Maurice "Moe" Jackson
- Lieutenant Colonel Ross Bishop (1976)
- Lieutenant Colonel Allan Marshall
- Lieutenant Colonel Gary Connors
- Lieutenant Colonel John Murray
- Lieutenant Colonel Alain Martineau, CD (to 1993)
- Lieutenant Colonel Ernie Garbutt, CD (from 1993)
- Lieutenant Colonel Daniel Braun (to 2000)
- Lieutenant Colonel Warren Sanderson (2000 to 2003)
- Lieutenant Colonel Alain Martineau (to 2008)
- Lieutenant Colonel Luc Tremblay (from 2008)
- Lieutenant Colonel Daniel Lamoureux (12^{e}RBC) (2013 to 2015); subsequently commanding officer of Canadian Army Influence Activities Task Force in Kingston, ON (2015); Director of Army Reserve in Ottawa (2022)
- Lieutenant Colonel Louis-Benoit Dutil (2015 to 2018)
- Lieutenant Colonel J.A. Éric Beaudoin (2018–2021), former commanding officer of Les Fusiliers de Sherbrooke (2005 to 2010)
- Lieutenant Colonel Paul Langlais, CSM, MSM, CD, (2021–2025), former commanding officer of Les Fusiliers de Sherbrooke (2002–2005) and The Royal Montreal Regiment (2011–2015)
- Lieutenant Colonel Samuel Beaudette, CD (2025 to present)

Regimental sergeant majors

- RSM Oxford
- RSM Moore
- Chief Warrant Officer George Lavigne
- Chief Warrant Officer Garth Bishop (1970)
- Chief Warrant Officer Ernie Kirby
- Chief Warrant Officer B.P. Bourque (1976)
- Chief Warrant Officer Jim Oakley
- Chief Warrant Officer Ryan Quinn
- Chief Warrant Officer Denis Gauthier
- Chief Warrant Officer Jeff George
- Chief Warrant Officer Christopher Galvin
- Chief Warrant Officer Brian Rowell (2002–04)
- Chief Warrant Officer Jacques Madore (2004–2008)
- Chief Warrant Officer Éric Decubber (2008–11)
- Chief Warrant Officer Sebastian Landry
- Master Warrant Officer J.S.B.M. (Mathieu) Giard (2015–18), promoted chief warrant officer and appointed regimental sergeant major of 2 Canadian Ranger Patrol Group
- Chief Warrant Officer David Lapalme-Robitaille (2018–2021)
- Chief Warrant Officer Justin Dohler (2021–2024)
- Chief Warrant Officer Ghislain Hamel (2024 to present)

== Notable Sherbrookes ==
- Hon. David Price, P.C. MP [Sherbrooke Regiment 1959 – 1965] – elected Member of Parliament for Compton Stanstead. Elect Progressive Conservative 2 June 1997 to 13 September 2000; sat as Liberal 14 September to 27 November 2000; reelected 27 November 2000 to 27 June 2004 (7 years 26 days). Mayor of Lennoxville (1989–97) and Counsellor for the Borough of Lennoxville in Sherbrooke (2009 to 2017).
- Brigadier-General Sydney Valpy Radley-Walters CMM, DSO, MC, CD,
- Major (Retd) Edson Warner, CD QM5 [Sherbrooke Regiment, Sherbrooke Hussars 1949 – 1973] – Canadian Olympian, rifle and pistol shooter, member of Canadian Forces Sports Hall of Fame, Dominion of Canada Rifle Association Target Rifle and Service Rifle Halls of Fame.

== Order of precedence ==
Sixth of 18 Canadian reserve armoured regiments.

| Preceded by The Queen's York Rangers (1st American Regiment) (RCAC) | The Sherbrooke Hussars | Succeeded by 12^{e} Régiment blindé du Canada |
