= Sherbrooke Regiment (disambiguation) =

Sherbrooke Regiment (the Canadian units also called "The Sherbrookes") may refer to:

- Sherbrooke Hussars (est. 1965), an armoured regiment, a Canadian army regiment
- Sherbrooke Fusilier Regiment (1940–1946), a regiment, a WW2 Canadian army regiment
- Fusiliers de Sherbrooke (est. 1910), an infantry regiment, a francophone unit of the Canadian army
- The Sherbrooke Regiment (1866–1965), a regiment, an anglophone unit of the Canadian army

== See also ==
- Sherbrooke (disambiguation)
