= 7th Hussars (disambiguation) =

7th Hussars is a nickname for a British Army cavalry regiment active 1715–1958.

7th Hussars or 7th Hussars Regiment may also refer to:

- 7th Hussars (Canada), a Canadian Militia regiment active 1903-1936
- 7th/11th Hussars, a Canadian Army cavalry/armoured regiment that now forms part of The Sherbrooke Hussars
- 7th Hussar Regiment (France), French Army unit
