= Fusiliers de Sherbrooke =

Les Fusiliers de Sherbrooke
- Regimental badge
- Active: 1910–present
- Country: Canada
- Branch: Canadian Army
- Type: Primary Reserve infantry
- Role: infantry
- Size: Two companies and one regimental band
- Part of: 35 Canadian Brigade Group
- Garrison/HQ: Sherbrooke, Quebec
- Motto: Droit au but (French for 'To the point')
- March: "Queen City"
- Engagements: First World War; Second World War; War in Afghanistan
- Battle honours: See § Battle honours
- Website: www.canada.ca/en/army/corporate/2-canadian-division/les-fusiliers-de-sherbrooke.html

Les Fusiliers de Sherbrooke is a Primary Reserve infantry regiment of the Canadian Army. It is based in Sherbrooke, Quebec, with a sub-unit in Granby.

== Badge ==
A grenade with the Crown superimposed upon the ball within an annulet inscribed Les Fusiliers de Sherbrooke, surmounted by a beaver and super-imposed upon a maple leaf; the whole resting on a scroll inscribed Droit au but.

== Lineage ==
Regimental colour

Regimental camp flag

=== Les Fusiliers de Sherbrooke ===
- Originated 1 April 1910 in Sherbrooke, Quebec, as the 54th Regiment (Carabiniers de Sherbrooke)
- Redesignated 29 March 1920 as Les Carabiniers de Sherbrooke
- Redesignated 15 January 1933 as Les Fusiliers de Sherbrooke
- Redesignated 7 November 1940 as Les Fusiliers de Sherbrooke (Reserve)
- Redesignated 18 March 1942 as the 2nd (Reserve) Battalion, Les Fusiliers de Sherbrooke
- Redesignated 1 June 1945 as Les Fusiliers de Sherbrooke

Early in World War II the Sherbrooke Fusiliers Regiment was formed with men from Les Fusiliers de Sherbrooke and The Sherbrooke Regiment. Shortly after establishment, the spelling was changed to singular form Fusilier, as in Sherbrooke Fusilier Regiment.

=== Lineage chart ===
Lineage chart

1910	54th Regt "Carabiniers de Sherbrooke"
1915	163rd "Overseas" Bn, CEF
1917	Absorbed by 10th Reserve Bn, CEF
1920	1st Bn (163rd Bn, CEF), Les Carabiniers de Sherbrooke	2nd Bn, (Note: Reserve) Les Carabiniers de Sherbrooke
1933	1st Bn (163rd Bn, CEF), Les Fusiliers de Sherbrooke	2nd Bn, Les Fusiliers de Sherbrooke
1936	Les Fusiliers de Sherbrooke	Disbanded
1940	The Sherbrooke Fusiliers Regt, CASF	Les Fusiliers de Sherbrooke (Reserve)
1940	1st Bn, The Sherbrooke Fusilier Regt, CASF
1942	27th Armd Regt (The Sherbrooke Fusiliers Regt), CAC, CASF	1st Bn, Les Fusiliers de Sherbrooke, CASF	2nd (Reserve) Bn, Les Fusiliers de Sherbrooke
1945	27th Armd Regt (The Sherbrooke Fusiliers Regt), RCAC, CASF	Disbanded	Les Fusiliers de Sherbrooke
1946	Disbanded

== Perpetuations ==
=== Great War ===
- 163rd Battalion (French-Canadian), CEF

== Operational history ==
=== Great War ===
Details of the 54th Regiment "Carabiniers de Sherbrooke" were called out on active service on 6 August 1914 for local protection duties.

The 163rd Battalion (French-Canadian), CEF was authorized on 22 December 1915 and embarked for Bermuda on 26 May 1916 for garrison duty. It sailed from Canada for Great Britain on 27 November 1916 where it was absorbed by the 10th Reserve Battalion, CEF, on 8 January 1917 to provide reinforcements for the Canadian Corps in the field. The battalion disbanded on 15 September 1917.

=== Second World War ===
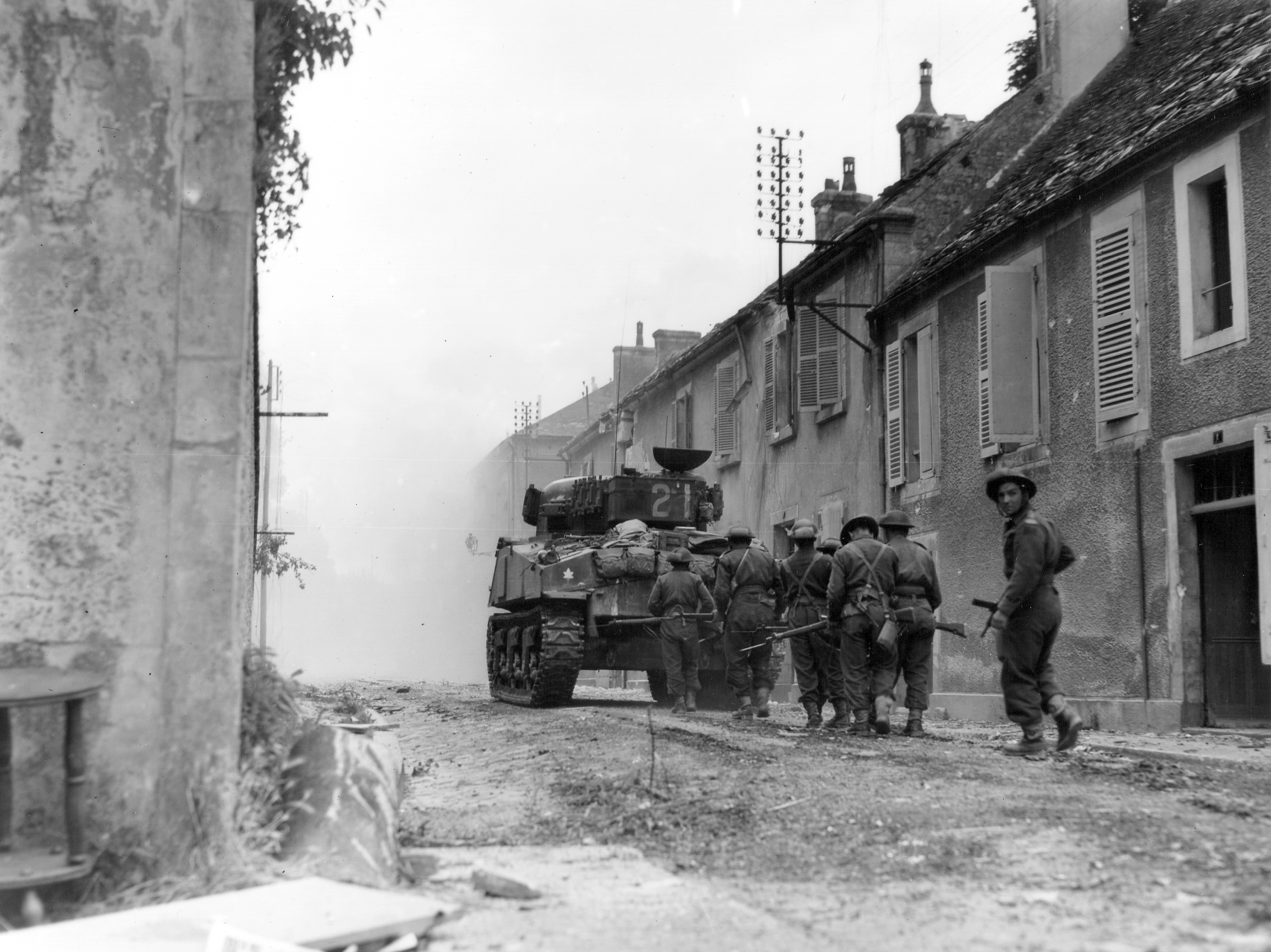
Sherman tank of Sherbrooke Fusilier Regiment, Falaise, 17 August 1944

Les Fusiliers de Sherbrooke, in conjunction with The Sherbrooke Regiment (Machine Gun) (now The Sherbrooke Hussars), mobilized The Sherbrooke Fusiliers Regiment, CASF, for active service on 24 May 1940. The name Fusilier was plural initially but subsequently changed to singular. It was redesignated as the 1st Battalion, The Sherbrooke Fusiliers Regiment, CASF, on 7 November 1940 and as the 1st Battalion, The Sherbrooke Fusilier Regiment, CASF, on 15 November 1940. The 1st Battalion was converted to an armoured regiment on 26 January 1942 and designated as the 27th Armoured Regiment (The Sherbrooke Fusilier Regiment), CAC, CASF. By this time the name Fusilier was singular. It was redesignated as the 27th Armoured Regiment (The Sherbrooke Fusilier Regiment), RCAC, CASF, on 2 August 1945. The regiment served in Newfoundland on garrison duty from 13 August 1941 to 15 February 1942, and embarked for Great Britain on 27 October 1942. On D-Day, 6 June 1944, it landed in Normandy, France as part the 2nd Canadian Armoured Brigade, and it continued to fight in North West Europe until the end of the war. The overseas regiment was disbanded on 15 February 1946.

The regiment subsequently mobilized the 1st Battalion, Les Fusiliers de Sherbrooke, CASF, for active service on 18 March 1942. It served in Canada in a home defence role as part of the 15th Infantry Brigade, 7th Canadian Division and the 14th Infantry Brigade, 6th Canadian Division. Between September 30, 1942, and October 13, 1943, Les Fusiliers de Sherbrooke, CASF, was stationed at Camp Debert, Nova Scotia. On 10 January 1945, it embarked for Great Britain, where it was disbanded for reinforcements on 18 January 1945.

=== Afghanistan ===
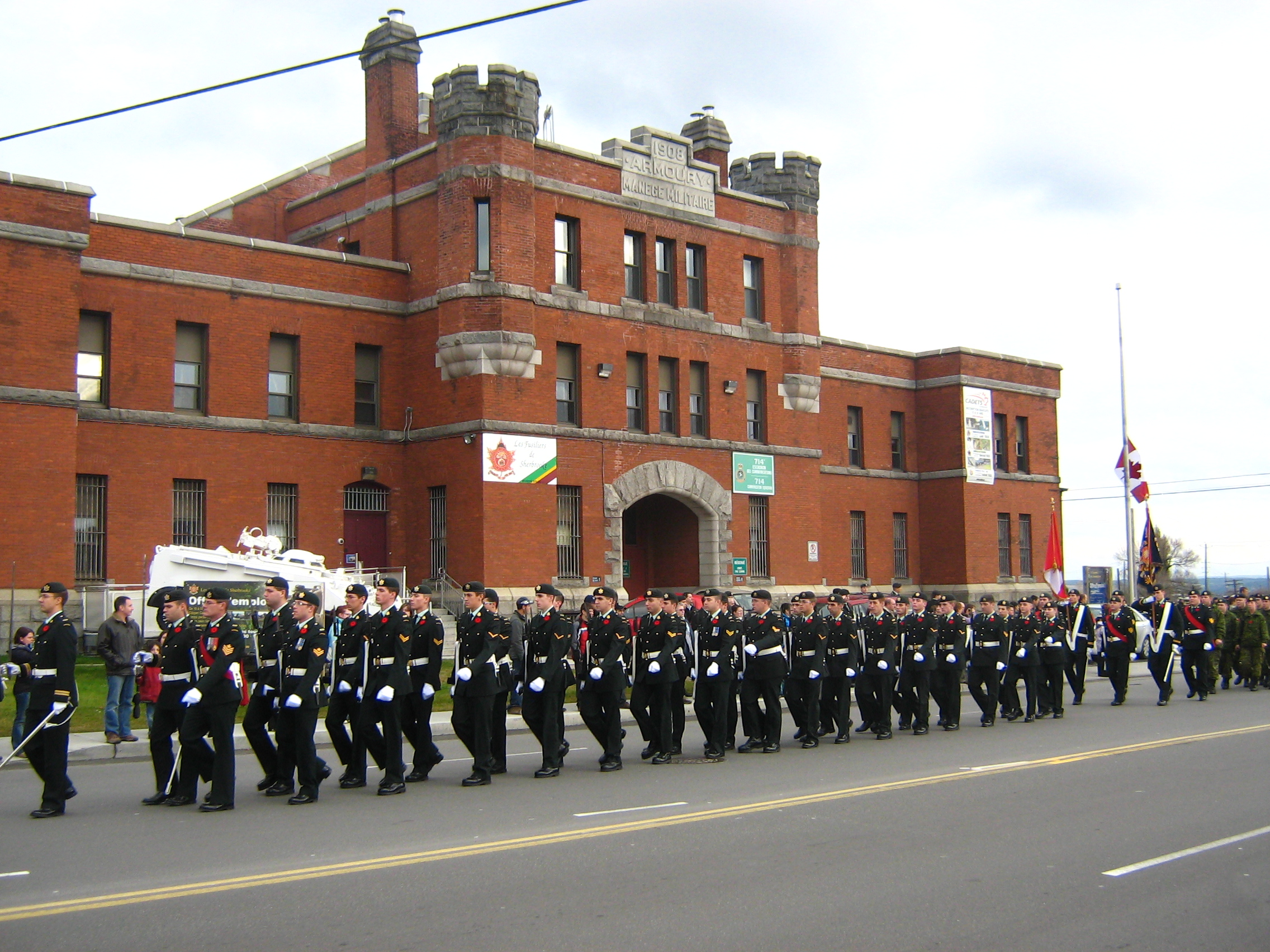
The regiment on parade

The regiment contributed an aggregate of more than 20% of its authorized strength to the various task forces which served in Afghanistan between 2002 and 2014.

== Regimental band ==
The regimental band, known as the Musique des Fusiliers de Sherbrooke, had previously ended its operations in the 1970s before was re-created in the early 1990s by order of Lieutenant-Colonel Pierre Véronneau, the regimental commander. It has a history than spans long before the creation of the regiment in 1910. The band's first director, Lieutenant Serge Bélanger, led the band with a small group of musicians, laid the foundations for the band to be significantly expanded to a 30-member force. It is one of nine military bands in Quebec. In 1996, Captain Sylvain Côté took over as director of music, a position he still held as of 2019. The regimental band supports the personnel of the regiment for various ceremonies and parades, as well as units in Estrie. The band also has engaged in many charity concerts in Quebec. In April 2013, the band donated $2,000 to musical organizations in the region.

== Alliances ==
- United Kingdom - The Rifles

== Battle honours ==
The regimental colour of Les Fusiliers de Sherbrooke

.

In the list below, battle honours in small capitals were awarded for participation in large operations and campaigns, while those in lowercase indicate honours granted for more specific battles. Those battle honours in bold type are emblazoned on the regimental colour.

=== The Great War ===
- **Amiens**

=== The Second World War ===
- **Normandy Landing**
- **Authie**
- **Caen**
- The Orne
- **Bourguébus Ridge**
- Faubourg de Vaucelles
- St. André-sur-Orne
- **Falaise**
- Falaise Road
- Clair Tizon
- The Laison
- Antwerp–Turnhout Canal
- **The Scheldt**
- The Lower Maas
- **The Rhineland**
- The Hochwald
- **Xanten**
- **The Rhine**
- Emmerich–Hoch Elten
- **Zutphen**
- Deventer
- North-West Europe, 1944–1945

=== Afghanistan Theatre Honour ===
- Afghanistan

== Notable personalities ==
- Lieutenant Colonel Jean-Marie-Joseph-Pantaléon Pelletier was the regiment's first commanding officer. He had previously served with the 9th Voltigeurs during the North-West Rebellion and had been the medical officer of the 11th Hussars of Richmond.

== Armoury ==
Site	Date(s)	Designated	Description	Image
Sherbrooke Armoury, 64 Belvédère street South, Sherbrooke, Quebec	1908	Canada's Register of Historic Places; Recognized - 1991 Register of the Government of Canada Heritage Buildings	This large centrally located building with a low-pitched gable roof, has a large, unobstructed drill hall space	

== Les Fusiliers de Sherbrooke Regimental Museum ==
Les Fusiliers de Sherbrooke Regimental Museum
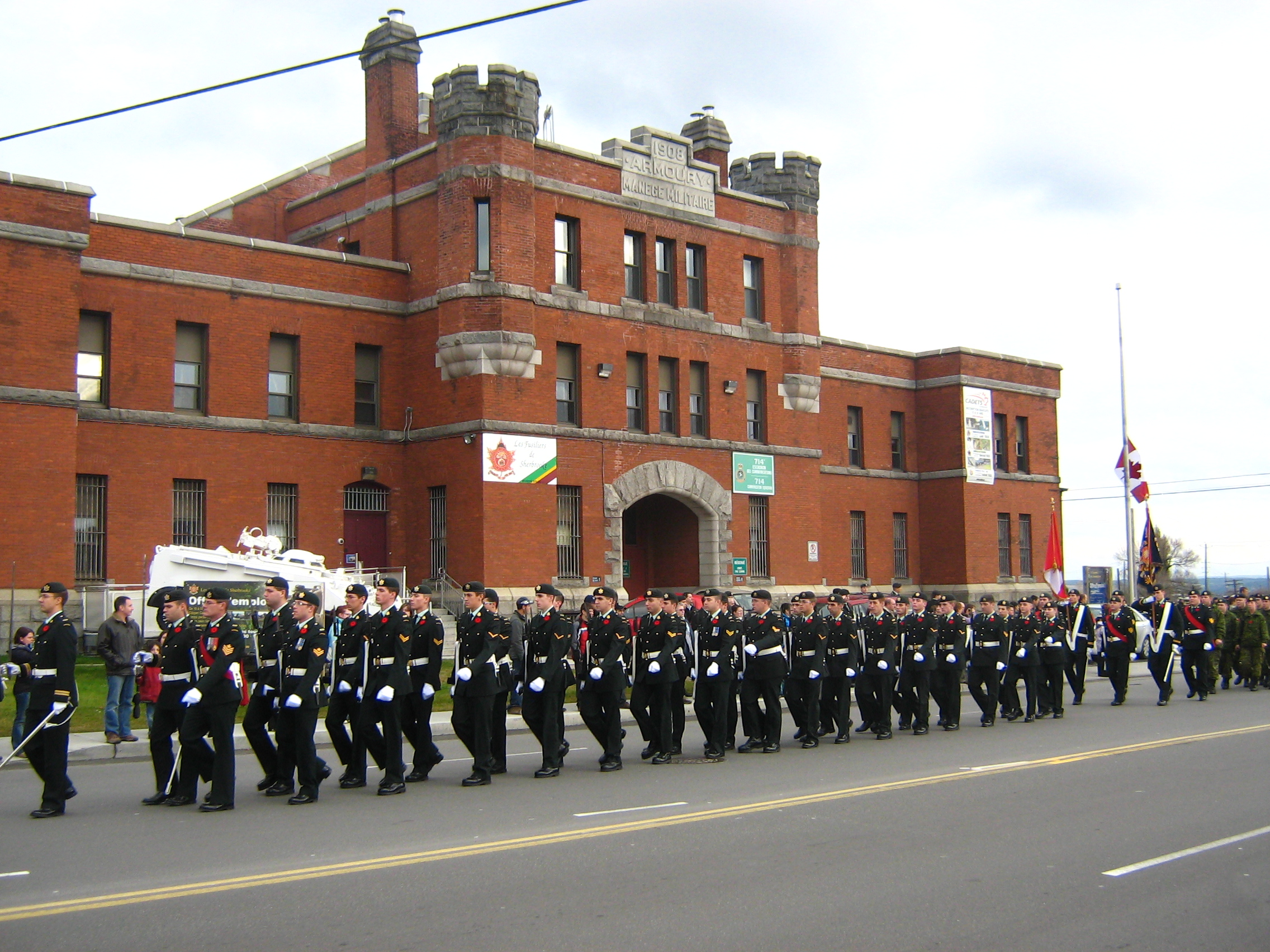
- Location: 64 Belvédère Street South Sherbrooke, Quebec Canada
- Type: Regimental Museum

The museum promotes the military history of Sherbrooke and the military history of Canada. The museum exhibits materials that relate to the regiment's history, from its inception to the present. The museum collects, preserves, and shows, documents, artifacts and photos which illustrate the military life of other regiments and units.

== See also ==
- List of armouries in Canada
- Military history of Canada
- History of the Canadian Army
- Canadian Forces

== Order of precedence ==
Preceded by The Calgary Highlanders (10th Canadians)	Les Fusiliers de Sherbrooke	Succeeded by The Seaforth Highlanders of Canada
