= Edson Warner =

Canadian sports shooter (1930–2019)

Personal information
- Nickname: Ed
- Born: 6 March 1930 Sawyerville, Quebec, Canada
- Died: 20 August 2019 (aged 89) Lennoxville, Quebec, Canada

Sport
- Sport: Sports shooting

Edson Warner CD (6 March 1930 – 20 August 2019) was a Canadian sports shooter. He competed at the 1952 Summer Olympics in Helsinki and 1960 Summer Olympics in Rome. He represented Canada at the World Shooting Championships in Oslo (1952), Moscow (1958) and Wiesbaden, West Germany (1966). He earned a place on nine Bisley teams, and competed in matches or friendlies including Commonwealth Games in 13 countries.

== Biography ==
At the 1960 Summer Olympics, Warner led Group Two of 50m prone rifle in qualifying with 394 out of 400, or an average of 98.5 points per target. On the second day, 99 on his first target was second only to the eventual gold medalist's 100. However, 93 on his second target and 95 on his fifth target dropped him from credible challenger to 27th place, even though his score of 578 was only 9 points behind the bronze medalist's score. Such was the level of competitiveness in that event. Fellow Canadian and defending 1956 Summer Olympics bronze medalist Gil Boa finished 12th with 584.

While serving as an officer in the Canadian Army in the Sherbrooke Regiment and the Sherbrooke Hussars, he won five Queen's Medal for Champion Shot in the Canadian Armed Forces (1955, '68, '69, '70 and '71). The Queen's Medal is the only Canadian honour awarded in open competition. He was serving in the 7th/11th Hussars at the time of amalgamation into the Sherbrooke Hussars. He received the Canadian Forces' Decoration for long service, and the Queen Elizabeth Diamond Jubilee Medal for a lifetime of high level competitiveness, good sportsmanship and contribution to the military and civilian shooting sports. The Major Edson Warner CD QM5 Trophy was initially awarded to the top individual in Service Rifle, Stage 1 - CAF Reserve., and has since been moved to the winners of Match 32, team casualty evacuation at the Canadian Forces Small Arms Concentration.

Edson Warner attended Lennoxville High School, McGill University where he received a Bachelor of Commerce, and Bishop's University where he received a Bachelor of Arts.

He was a member of the Dominion of Canada Rifle Association's Target Rifle Hall of Fame, inducted in 2001 as the 51st member, and the 4th member in the inaugural induction to the Service Conditions Hall of Fame in 2011, was presented his 60-year badge in 2008 following a 60-year tradition of attendance at the National Matches. In 2012, he was named to the Canadian Forces Sports Hall of Fame.

Olympic shooting career of Edson Warner
Age	Event	Distance	Final Place
1952 Helsinki Summer
22	Men's Rapid-Fire Pistol	25 metres	42nd
22	Men's Small-Bore Rifle, Three Positions	50 metres	35th
22	Men's Small-Bore Rifle, Prone	50 metres	26th
1960 Rome Summer
30	Men's Free Rifle, Three Positions	300 metres	24th
30	Men's Small-Bore Rifle, Prone	50 metres	27th

=== Canadian military personal decorations ===
Canadian military personal decorations
Image	Decoration	Notes	Refs.
	Queen Elizabeth II Diamond Jubilee Medal	To honour significant contributions and achievements by Canadians	2012
	Canadian Forces' Decoration	12 years service with the Regular or Reserve forces, and one bar for each subsequent 10 years of qualifying service	
	Queen's Medal for Champion Shot with 5 bars (rosettes not shown on ribbon to the left)	For the highest aggregate score in stages one and two of the Queen's Medal Competition of CF Reserve Force	1955, 1968, 1969, 1971, 1972
