= 27th Field Artillery Regiment, RCA =

- Active: 1910–1970
- Country: Canada
- Branch: Canadian Militia (1936-1940); Canadian Army (1940-1970)
- Type: Field Artillery
- Size: One Regiment
- Part of: Royal Regiment of Canadian Artillery
- Garrison/HQ: Farnham, Quebec
- Mottos: Ubique (Latin for 'Everywhere'); Quo fas et gloria ducunt (Latin for 'Whither right and glory lead')
- March: Quick: "British Grenadiers"

The 27th Field Artillery Regiment, Royal Canadian Artillery was a Canadian Army Reserve artillery regiment based in Farnham, Quebec. The regiment was reduced to nil strength in 1970 and placed on the Supplementary Order of Battle.

== History ==
The 26th Canadian Horse "Stanstead" Dragoons was established at Coaticook, Quebec on 1 April 1910. It had squadrons located in Coaticook, Magog, Stanstead, Quebec and Ayer's Cliff. Headquarters and "A" Squadron at Coaticook (previously known as E Squadron, 7th Hussars [No. 6 Company, 58th Compton Regiment, 1 February 1900); "B" Squadron at Magog (D Squadron, 11th Hussars, 1 April 1905); "C" Squadron at Stanstead ('A Squadron, 13th Scottish Light Dragoons [Troop of Cavalry at Stanstead, 23 February 1872]; and "D" Squadron' at Ayer's Cliff (E Squadron, 6th Duke of Connaught's Royal Canadian Hussars, 1 July 1903).

The regiment was redesignated the 26th Stanstead Dragoons on 3 September 1912.

The 26th Stanstead Dragoons in full dress wore a scarlet dragoon tunic with black facings and dark blue trousers with a broad yellow stripe. THe regimental headdress was a gilded helmet and badge (except for enamelled centre and silver scroll) with a black-over-white hair plume.

After the outbreak of the First World War, a new unit, the multi-regiment Canadian Mounted Rifles, was created. On 7 November 1914, the 5th Regiment, Canadian Mounted Rifles was authorized for service. At the time of its creation, the 5th Regiment, CMR, had no linkage with the 26th Stanstead Dragoons. On 18 July 1915, the regiment embarked for Great Britain. On 24 October 1915, the regiment disembarked in France where it fought as part of the 2nd Brigade, Canadian Mounted Rifles. On 3 January 1916, the regiment was converted to infantry and redesignated as the 5th Battalion, Canadian Mounted Rifles. The battalion was assigned to the 8th Infantry Brigade, 3rd Canadian Division where it fought in France and Flanders until the end of the war in November 1918. On 30 August 1920, the battalion was disbanded.

In March 1920 there was a reform of the Canadian Militia reforms after the Otter Commission. On 15 March 1920 the 26th Stanstead Dragoons was redesignated as the Eastern Townships Mounted Rifles, Non-Permanent Active Militia, Canadian Militia. The new Eastern Townships Mounted Rifles was a two regiment unit, with the 1st Regiment (5th Canadian Mounted Rifles Battalion, CEF) and a nil-strength reserve battalion. The Eastern Townships Mounted Rifles were assigned, granted, the history, heritage, perpetuation of the 5th Battalion, Canadian Mounted Rifles.

In 1936 there was a further reorganisation of the Canadian Militia. The nil-strength reserve battalion was disbanded, and the 1st Regiment (5th Canadian Mounted Rifles Battalion, CEF) converted to artillery. On 15 December 1936 the regiment was converted to artillery and redesignated 27th Field Brigade, RCA. The mounted/cavalry lineage and perpetuation of the 5th Canadian Mounted Rifles Battalion (Eastern Townships Regiment), CEF was transferred to the 7th/11th Hussars.

Over the next years, it was successively '27th (Reserve) Field Brigade, RCA', '27th (Reserve) Field Regiment, RCA', the '27th Field Regiment, RCA', and 27th Field Artillery Regiment, RCA on 12 April 1960. The regiment was reduced to nil strength on 1 April 1970.

== Battle honours ==
The Eastern Townships Mounted Rifles were granted these battle honours in 1929.

- Mount Sorrel
- Somme, 1916 (Note: Selected to be borne on colours and appointments)
- Flers-Courcelette
- Ancre Heights
- Arras, 1917, '18
- Vimy, 1917
- Hill 70
- Ypres, 1917
- Passchendaele
- Amiens
- Scarpe 1918
- Hindenburg Line
- Canal du Nord
- Cambrai, 1918
- Valenciennes
- Sambre
- France and Flanders, 1915-18

== Lineage ==
- Originated on 1 April 1910, in Coaticook, Quebec, as the 26th Canadian Horse (Stanstead Dragoons).
- Redesignated on 3 September 1912, as the 26th Stanstead Dragoons.
- Redesignated on 15 March 1920, as The Eastern Townships Mounted Rifles.
- Converted from cavalry to artillery regiment on 15 December 1936, and redesignated as the 27th Field Brigade, RCA.
- Redesignated on 7 November 1940, as the 27th (Reserve) Field Brigade, RCA.
- Redesignated on 1 March 1943, as the 27th (Reserve) Field Regiment.
- Redesignated on 15 October 1943, as the 27th Field Regiment, RCA.
- Redesignated on 12 April 1960, as the 27th Field Artillery Regiment, RCA.
- Reduced to nil strength 1 April 1970, and transferred to the Supplementary Order of Battle.

Lineage chart

1872	Tp of Cavy at Stanstead
1900	No. 6 Coy, 58th Compton Regt
1903	E Sqn, 7th Hussars	E Sqn, 6th Duke of Connaught's Royal Canadian Hussars
1904	A Sqn, 13th Scottish Light Dragoons
1905	D Sqn, 11th Hussars
1910	26th Canadian Horse "Stanstead" Dragoons
1912	26th Stanstead Dragoons
1920	1st Regt (5th CMR Bn, CEF), The Eastern Townships Mounted Rifles	2nd Regt, (Note: Reserve) The Eastern Townships Mounted Rifles
1936	27th Fd Bde, RCA	Disbanded
1940	27th (Reserve) Fd Bde, RCA
1943	27th (Reserve) Fd Regt, RCA
1943	27th Fd Regt, RCA
1960	27th Fd Arty Regt, RCA
1970	Supplementary Order of Battle

== Allocated batteries ==
27th Field Artillery Regiment, RCA (15 December 1936)

- Regimental Headquarters (Coaticook, Quebec)
- 72nd Field Battery, RCA (Coaticook)
- 73rd Field Battery (Howitzer), RCA (Magog)
- 74th Field Battery, RCA (Stanstead)
- 75th Field Battery, RCA (Cowansville)

== See also ==
- List of regiments of cavalry of the Canadian Militia (1900–1920)
