= 5th Battalion, Canadian Mounted Rifles, CEF =

5th Battalion, Canadian Mounted Rifles
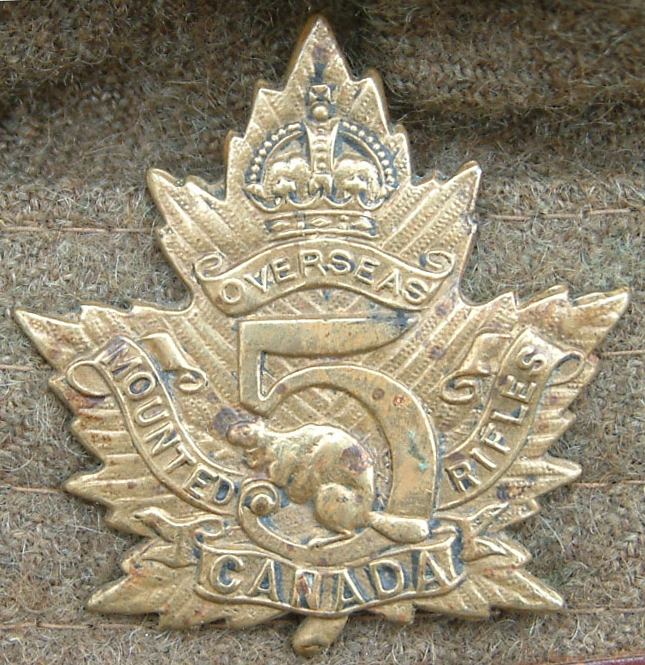
- Cap badge of the 5th Battalion, Canadian Mounted Rifles
- Active: 1914–1919
- Country: Canada
- Branch: Canadian Expeditionary Force
- Type: Mounted infantry
- Size: Battalion
- Part of: 8th Canadian Infantry Brigade
- March: The British Grenadiers

Insignia
- Battle patch

The 5th Battalion Canadian Mounted Rifles were a mounted infantry unit of the Canadian Expeditionary Force (CEF) during World War I. The battalion of the Canadian Mounted Rifles was raised from volunteers of the 7th and 11th (Canadian) Hussars from the Eastern Townships of Quebec.

Formed in 1915, they were transported to England later that year. In 1916, they converted to an infantry battalion attached to the 8th Canadian Infantry Brigade, 3rd Canadian Division, CEF (later the Canadian Corps). The battalion saw action in France and Flanders between 1916 and 1918.

== Battle honours ==
In 1929–31, well after the First World War had ended, Canada assigned battle honours to those units involved in pivotal battles and campaigns during the war. The 5th Canadian Mounted Rifles were accorded the following battle honours:

- Mount Sorrel
- Somme, 1916
- Flers-Courcelette
- Ancre Heights
- Arras, 1917, '18
- Vimy, 1917
- Hill 70
- Ypres, 1917
- Passchendaele
- Cambrai, 1918
- Sambre
- Amiens
- Scarpe, 1918
- Hindenburg Line
- Canal du Nord
- Valenciennes
- France and Flanders, 1915–18

During the Battle of Passchendale, the 5th Canadian Mounted Rifles fighting strength was reduced by 60% in a single day.

Two members of the battalion were awarded the Victoria Cross, the highest decoration for bravery in the British Empire. The citation for George Pearkes, VC, reads as follows:

"During the advance of 30/31 October 1917, as a member of the 5th Canadian Mounted Rifles Battalion, Major George Randolph Pearkes of Watford, Hertfordshire, England, participated in the battle at Passchendaele. He led the troops under his command to capture and consolidate considerably more than the objectives allotted to him. Just prior to the advance, Major Pearkes was wounded in the left thigh. Regardless of his wound, he continued to lead his men with the utmost gallantry, despite many obstacles. At a particular stage of the attack, his further advance was threatened by a strong point which was an objective of the battalion on his left, but which they had not succeeded in capturing. Quickly appreciating the situation, he captured and held this point, thus enabling his further advance to be successfully pushed forward."

and for Charles Smith Rutherford, VC during the Hundred Days Offensive:

"On 16 August 1918, as a member of the 5th Canadian Mounted Rifles Battalion, Lt. Charles Smith Rutherford of Colbourne, Ontario, participated in the offensive to take Munchy-le-Preux. Once the objective taken, he went forward alone to reconnoiter, some distance ahead of the assaulting party. Entering the outskirts of the village, he walked straight into an enemy machine-gun section, holding a pill-box, but which was not looking for an attack from that quarter. Lt. Rutherford called immediately for their surrender stating that if not his machine-gunners would open fire immediately. After a brief discussion, the German officer decided to surrender. Lt. Rutherford then ordered that the other German machine-gun position located a little ways up the hill also surrendered; which it was so ordered to do. The entire garrison, consisting of 2 officers and 43 men with 3 machine-guns, was thus captured single-handedly by Lt. Rutherford. When his section arrived at his location, he observed that the right assault party was held up by heavy machine-gun fire from another pill-box. This he attacked with a Lewis-gun section and captured a further 35 prisoners with machine-guns, thus enabling the assault party to continue their advance."

== Perpetuation ==
Following World War I, the 5th Canadian Mounted Rifles were perpetuated by the Eastern Townships Mounted Rifles. Following the regiment's conversion to artillery in 1936 the battle honours and lineage was passed onto the 7/XI Hussars which were later merged with the Sherbrooke Regiment to form the Sherbrooke Hussars who perpetuate them today.

The memory of the original unit was also perpetuated by its original members in the 5th Canadian Mounted Rifles Association. The association met annually from its formation in 1934 until it disbanded in 1969. The records of the association may be found at the Eastern Townships Research Centre at Bishop's University library, Lennoxville, Quebec.

== Notable battalion members ==
George Pearkes, VC, and Charles Rutherford, VC, are commemorated with named locations. The National Defence Headquarters building in Ottawa is named Major-General George R. Pearkes Building, and the Sherbrooke Hussars' local field training area near Saint-Elie-d'Orford is simply named Rutherford.

George Harold Baker was commanding officer and serving member of Parliament when he was killed in action at Wieltje Salient, West Flanders, Belgium, on June 2, 1916, during the Battle of Mount Sorrel. He is one of two MPs who died in military service.

== See also ==
- List of mounted regiments in the Canadian Expeditionary Force
- List of infantry battalions in the Canadian Expeditionary Force

== Notes and references ==
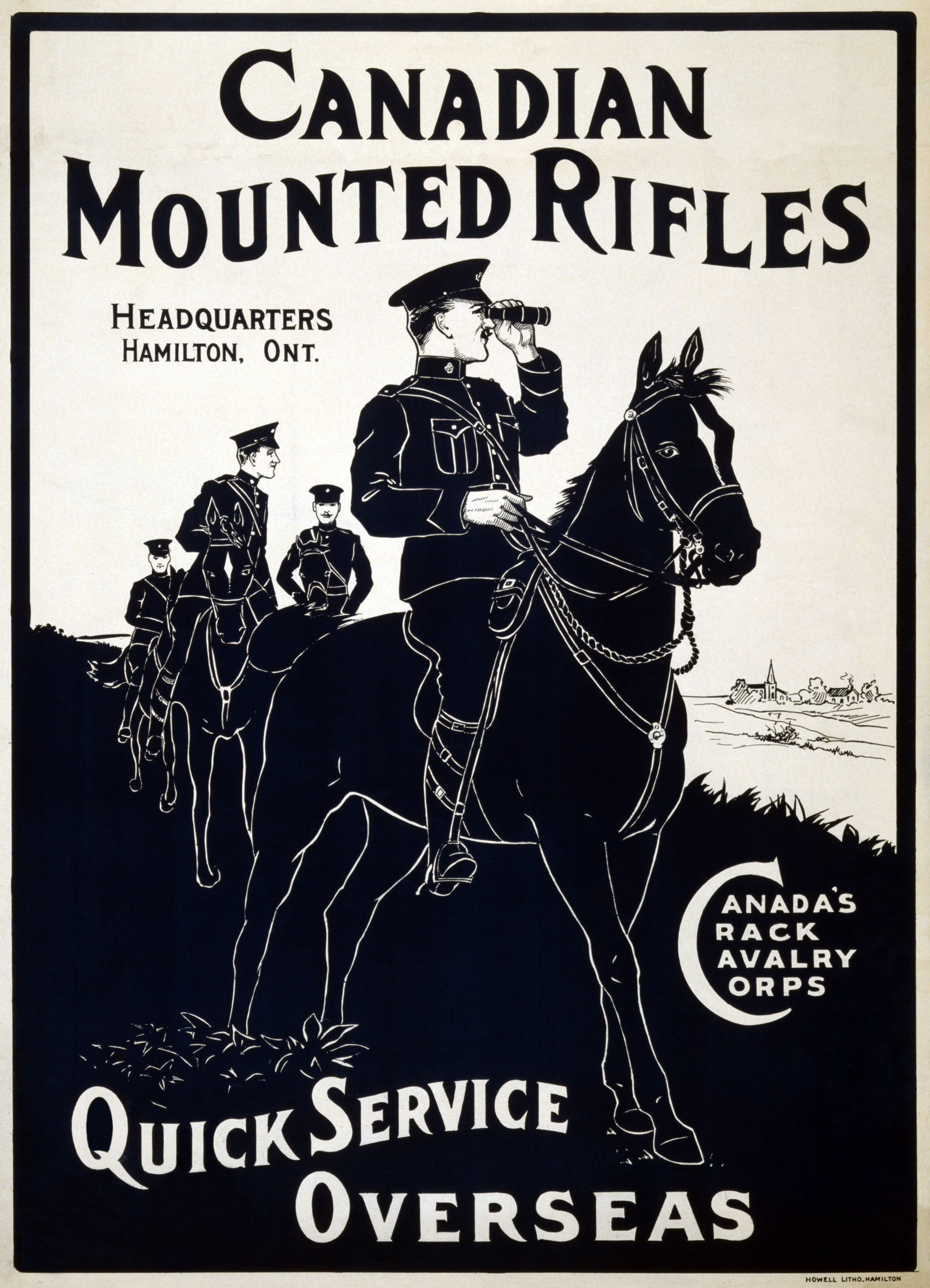
"Canada's Crack Cavalry Corps" World War I recruitment poster.
