= James King (Quebec politician) =

Canadian politician

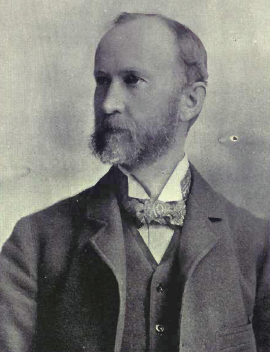

Member of the Legislative Assembly of Quebec for Mégantic
- In office 1892–1897
- Preceded by: Andrew Stuart Johnson
- Succeeded by: George Robert Smith

Personal details
- Born: February 18, 1848 Saint-Antoine-de-Tilly, Canada East
- Died: June 21, 1900 (aged 52) Lac Matapédia, near Saint-Pierre-du-Lac, also known as Val-Brillant, Quebec
- Party: Conservative

James King (February 18, 1848 – June 21, 1900) was a Canadian businessman and politician.

Born in Saint-Antoine-de-Tilly, Canada East, he received a Bachelor of Arts degree in 1867 and a Master of Arts degree in 1873 from the University of Bishop's College. He joined the family business, King Brothers, which was involved in mining. He was elected to the Legislative Assembly of Quebec in the 1892 election for the riding of Mégantic. A Conservative, he did not run in 1897.
