= 7th/11th Hussars =

- Active: 1936–1965
- Country: Canada
- Branch: Canadian Militia (1836–1940); Canadian Army (1940–1965)
- Type: Hussars
- Role: Light cavalry Armoured
- Size: One regiment
- Part of: Non-Permanent Active Militia (1936–1940); Royal Canadian Armoured Corps (1940–1965)
- Garrison/HQ: Bury, Quebec
- Motto(s): Steady
- Engagements: First World War; Second World War
- Battle honours: See #Battle Honours

The 7th/11th Hussars was a light cavalry regiment and later light armoured regiment of the Non-Permanent Active Militia of the Canadian Militia (now the Canadian Army). The regiment was formed in 1936 by the amalgamation of the 7th Hussars and the 11th Hussars from the Eastern Townships of Quebec. In 1965, the regiment was amalgamated with The Sherbrooke Regiment (RCAC) to form The Sherbrooke Hussars.

== History ==
=== Hong Kong ===
In July 1940, the 7th/11th Hussars contributed about half its officers and men to The Royal Rifles of Canada which fought in Hong Kong. From the elements not sent overseas, an armoured squadron was mobilized as the 2nd Canadian Armoured Brigade Headquarters Squadron (7th/11th Hussars) CASF on 27 February 1941. It departed Canada for the United Kingdom on 9 October 1941, however it was disbanded effective 1 January 1943 and personnel were absorbed by Headquarters, 2nd Canadian Armoured Brigade.

== Lineage ==
=== 7th/11th Hussars ===
- Originated on 21 September 1866 in Sherbrooke, Quebec as the Sherbrooke Battalion of Infantry.
- Redesignated on 15 March 1867 as the 53rd Sherbrooke Battalion of Infantry.
- Reorganized on 22 March 1867 as two separate battalions: the 54th Sherbrooke Battalion of Infantry (later The Sherbrooke Regiment) and the 53rd Melbourne Battalion of Infantry.
- Redesignated on 10 May 1867 as the 54th Richmond Battalion of Infantry.
- Redesignated on 8 May 1900 as the 54th Richmond Regiment.
- Converted to cavalry on 1 August 1903 and redesignated as the 11th Hussars.
- Amalgamated on 1 April 1936 with the 7th Hussars and redesignated as the 7th/11th Hussars.
- Redesignated on 27 February 1941 as the 2nd (Reserve) Regiment, 7th/11th Hussars.
- Redesignated on 1 April 1941 as the 16th (Reserve) Armoured Regiment, (7th/11th Hussars).
- Redesignated on 1 April 1946 as the 16th Reconnaissance Regiment (7th/11th Hussars), RCAC.
- Redesignated on 4 February 1949 as the 7th/11th Hussars (16th Reconnaissance Regiment).
- Redesignated on 1 September 1954 as the 7th/11th Hussars (16th Armoured Regiment).
- Redesignated on 19 May 1958 as the 7th/11th Hussars.
- Amalgamated on 15 February 1965 with The Sherbrooke Regiment (RCAC) and redesignated as The Sherbrooke Hussars.

=== 7th Hussars ===
- Originated on 11 October 1867 in Robinson, Quebec, as the 58th Compton Battalion of Infantry.
- Redesignated on 8 May 1900 as the 58th Compton Regiment.
- Converted to cavalry on 1 May 1903 and redesignated as the 7th Hussars.
- Amalgamated on 1 April 1936 with the 11th Hussars and redesignated as the 7th/11th Hussars.

== Perpetuations ==
- 5th Battalion, Canadian Mounted Rifles, CEF

The Eastern Townships Mounted Rifles were first granted the perpetuation of the 5th Canadian Mounted Rifles after the First World War. After the regiment was converted to artillery in 1936, the perpetuation was passed onto the 7th/11th Hussars.

== Organization ==
=== 7th/11th Hussars (1 April 1936) ===
- Regimental Headquarters (Bury, Quebec)
- HQ Squadron (Cookshire, Quebec)
- A Squadron (Danville, Quebec)
- B Squadron (Richmond, Quebec)
- C Squadron (Bishopton, Quebec)

== Alliances ==
- 7th Queen's Own Hussars (1936–1958)
- The Queen's Own Hussars (1958–1965)

== Battle Honours ==
=== Great War ===
- Mount Sorrel
- Somme, 1916
- Flers–Courcelette
- Ancre Heights
- Arras, 1917, '18
- Vimy, 1917
- Hill 70
- Ypres, 1917
- Passchendaele
- Amiens
- Scarpe, 1918
- Hindenburg Line
- Canal du Nord
- Cambrai, 1918
- Valenciennes
- Sambre
- France and Flanders 1915–18

=== Second World War ===
- Honorary distinction: badge of The Royal Rifles of Canada with year-dates "1941" was awarded as an honorary distinction for significantly reinforcing the Royal Rifles of Canada during their deployment with C Force to Hong Kong.

== Notable members ==
- Honoré Achim (1881-1950), MP Labelle (Quebec) 1911 to 1917, Captain 54th Sherbrooke Regiment. Crossed the floor of Parliament to the Liberal Party of Canada as a result of the conscription crisis.
- Joseph-Arthur Barrette (1875-1952), MP Berthier, Berthier--Maskinongé (Quebec) (1911 to 17, 1930 to 1935), Major 54th Sherbrooke Regiment
- Edson Warner
