= Harry Letson =

Major General Harry Letson CB CBE MC ED CD
- Born: Harry Farnham Germain Letson; September 26, 1896; Vancouver
- Died: April 10, 1992 (aged 95); Ottawa
- Education: McGill University, London University
- Spouse: Sally McKee Lang
- Parent(s): James Moore Letson and Mary Barbara McIntosh
- Engineering career
- Discipline: Mechanical Engineering
- Institutions: Canadian Army
- Practice name: Letson & Burpee
- Employer: University of British Columbia

Major General Harry Farnham Germain Letson, CB, CBE, MC, ED, CD (September 26, 1896 – April 10, 1992) was an engineer, educator and Canadian Army officer who served in both World War I and World War II.

== Early life ==
Letson was born in Vancouver in 1896. He was the son of James Moore Letson, a founder of the engineering firm Letson & Burpee, and Mary Barbara McIntosh,

== World War I military service ==
Letson joined the Canadian Militia in 1910. He was serving with the Western Universities Battalion at the start of World War I, soon afterwards became a non-commissioned officer and went with them to France in 1916. In 1917, he became a lieutenant in the 54th Battalion. He was severely wounded by machine gun fire during a raid near Vimy Ridge and was awarded the Military Cross.

== Interwar period ==
Following the war, he returned to Vancouver. He received an engineering degree from the Vancouver campus of McGill University (later the University of British Columbia) where he was the first ever graduate in mechanical engineering. He went on to earn a PhD in Mechanical Engineering from London University. From 1923 to 1935, Letson was an associate professor of mechanical engineering at the University of British Columbia. He was president of the Professional Engineers Association of British Columbia from 1935 to 1936. He later took over the management of Letson & Burpee, one of the largest engineering firms in Western Canada.

In 1926, he married Sally McKee Lang.

== World War II and later military service ==
In 1927, he became commanding officer of the militia unit The British Columbia Regiment. From 1930 to 1935, he was commanding officer of the Officer Training Corps at the University of British Columbia. In 1940, during World War II, he was posted to Washington, D.C. as military attaché to the Canadian joint staff mission. Letson helped conceive the CANLOAN scheme while visiting Canadian Military Headquarters in London in October 1943. He was named adjutant general in Ottawa in 1942. In 1944, he returned to Washington as chairman of the Canadian joint staff mission. He served as secretary to Governor General of Canada Sir Harold Alexander from 1946 to 1952. He was advisor to the army on militia from 1954 to 1958. In 1963, Letson was named honorary colonel for the British Columbia Regiment.

Letson excelled at shooting and attended the Army Operational Shooting Competition at Bisley five times, once as captain of the Canadian team. He served as president of the Dominion of Canada Rifle Association and of the British Columbia Rifle Association. The Letson Trophy is awarded to the winning team in the Canadian Forces Small Arms Concentration.

Letson was invested as a Commander of the Order of the British Empire in January 1944, and, in April that year, was conferred with the Legion of Merit by the United States, and invested as a Companion of the Order of the Bath in 1946. He was also awarded the Efficiency Decoration and the Canadian Forces' Decoration. He was nominated for the Order of Canada but died before the appointment could have been made.

== Legacy ==
Letson died in Ottawa at the age of 95.

Letson and his wife Sally helped establish the annual Sally Letson Symposium for the field of ophthalmology, first held in 1967. Letson Hall at the CNIB in Ottawa was also named in honour of Harry Letson.

Letson endowed an award to the University of British Columbia department of mechanical engineering. The Letson Prize is awarded annually in equal amounts to the head of the graduating class in each option of the undergraduate mechanical engineering program.
