= CANLOAN =

Canadian Army seconding program in World War II

The CANLOAN program (or the Canada Loan program) was a scheme created in 1944 to loan officers from the Canadian Army to serve in British Army units. The program's initial aims were to help supplement the undermanned British Army officer corps and provide alternate avenues for Canadian Army officers to see active service. The program initially called for 1,500 junior officers to serve in the CANLOAN program, although that number was later reduced to 625 in April 1944. In total, 673 officers from the CANLOAN program served with British Army units during the Second World War.

The majority of the officers in the program were loaned to British regiments that fought in the North-West Europe campaign of 1944–45. However, several CANLOAN officers also served with British Army and British Indian Army units in the Italian, Mediterranean and Middle East, and the Southeast Asian theatre.

== Background ==
The CANLOAN program was analogous to a program that existed during the First World War; although the program during that conflict saw British Army officers serve in Canadian Army regiments.

The Canadian Army also loaned out its members to the British Army earlier during the Second World War; with 201 officers and 147 soldiers of the Canadian Army loaned to the British First Army in Tunisia. The loaning of Canadian officers to the British First Army was approved in December 1942, with the first Canadian officers arriving in Tunisia in January 1943. Canadian officers attached to the British First Army units were treated as supernumerary personnel; as opposed to the officers of the CANLOAN program, who were integrated into their British units. Canadian officers attached to the British First Army later returned to their Canadian units in July 1943 in preparation for the Allied invasion of Sicily.

== History ==
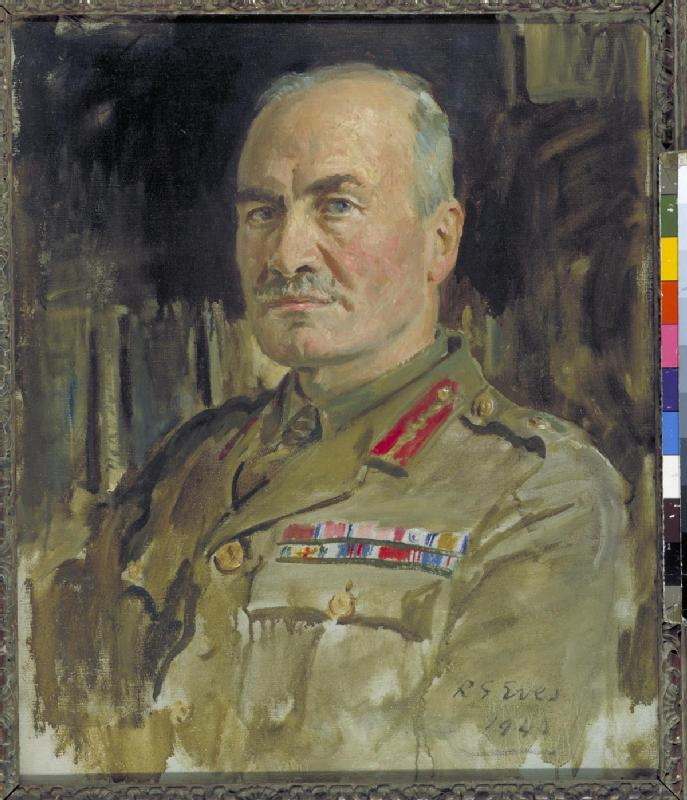
Portrait of General Ronald Forbes Adam of the British Army. Adam devised the CANLOAN scheme together with Major-General Harry Letson of the Canadian Army.

In 1943, the Canadian Army had a surplus of junior officers and did not have enough active regiments to employ them in; given that the army was only active in the Italian Front, and that the Home Defence divisions in Canada were disbanded. Conversely, the British Army faced a shortage of junior officers, with its forces deployed in a number of fronts; and a need to supplement its regiments in preparation for the Normandy landings. In an effort to rectify these issues, a scheme was devised to redeploy Canadian junior officers not in combat into active service, by "loaning" Canadian Army officers to various British Army units. The plan was first devised during a meeting between Major-General Harry Letson of the Canadian Army, and General Ronald Forbes Adam of the British Army in London on 9 October 1943. Canadian Military Headquarters and the British War Office later approved of the program on 4 February 1944. Preparations were made for the program in early 1944, although the plan was not formally enacted by the government of Canada until 29 April 1944 by Order in Council; several weeks after the first cohort of CANLOAN officers had already arrived in the United Kingdom. The Canada Loan program operated under the code word CANLOAN.

=== Service ===
After recruitment for the CANLOAN program took place the selected volunteers were sent to Sussex Military Camp in early 1944, to complete necessary preparations for overseas deployment. While stationed at Sussex Military Camp, officers of CANLOAN were placed under the command of Brigadier-General Milton Fowler Gregg of the Canadian Army. Originally, the CANLOAN plan called for 1,500 Canadian officers to volunteer with regiments in the British Army. A manpower crisis within the Canadian Army in 1944 forced them to cap the program at 625 members shortly after the first CANLOAN cohort landed in the United Kingdom.

The first batch of CANLOAN officers arrived in Liverpool on 6 April 1944, ferried from Canada by RMS Andes. Another 200 officers arrived in the United Kingdom on 7 April 1944, with the remainder arriving shortly afterwards. The officers were immediately posted to various British battalions that were under-strength. While the program was active, British divisions took in 40 CANLOAN officers on average. Canadian officers loaned to British Army regiments were treated as a part of the regiment for all purposes except for pay, which remained the responsibility of the Canadian Army. Additionally while on loan to the British Army, CANLOAN officers wore a specialized shoulder badge and flashes with the words Canada on it, and CDN appeared before their serial number. CANLOAN officers also had separate administrative arrangements from the rest of the units they were loaned to. Barring administrative and payment differences, CANLOAN officers had largely integrated into their units without issue. The ease of integrating CANLOAN officers into their respective British units was largely credited to the uniform fashion of training of military colleges and Officer Cadet Training Units in Canada and the United Kingdom.

The majority of the officers in the program were loaned to British regiments that fought in the North-West Europe campaign of 1944–45; with 100 officers serving with British airborne forces during the Normandy landings. Nearly half the officers assigned to the Royal Army Ordnance Corps were assigned to posts in the Mediterranean and Middle East theatre; with several other officers stationed with units in Italy. CANLOAN officers were also active in the Southeast Asian theatre, with 22 Canadian officers sent to the South East Asia Command in the summer of 1944; with the intended purpose to gain knowledge of tropical operations for the Canadian Army in anticipation for their participation in the Asian theatre once the war in Europe ended. Officers sent to Southeast Asia were posted with XV Corps of the British Indian Army.

There were 155 CANLOAN officers were promoted while serving with a British unit; with nearly half of the ordnance CANLOAN officers receiving promotions while serving with the British Army. Several CANLOAN officers were promoted as company commanders, and in one instance, was promoted as the commanding officer of their battalion.

== Members ==
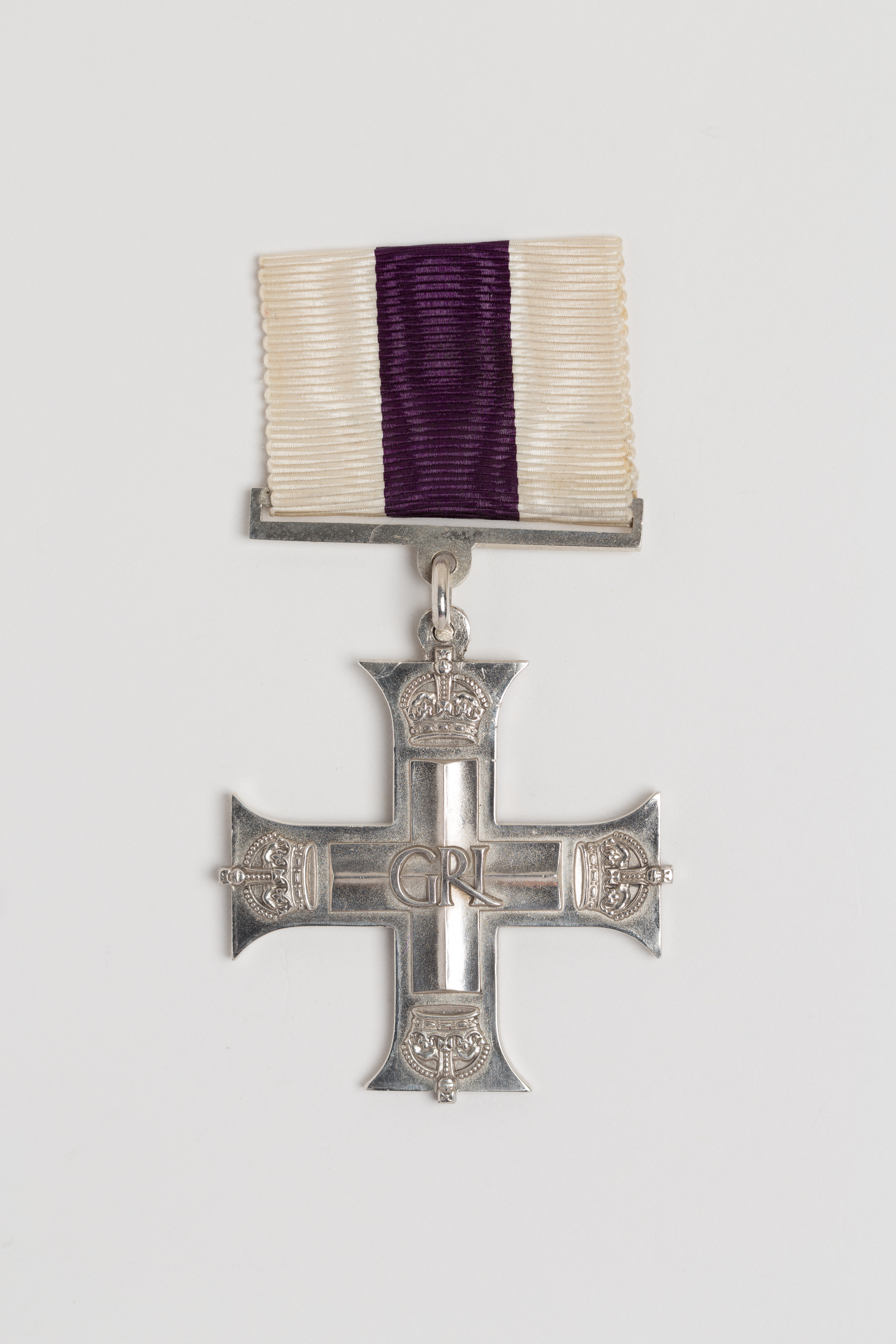
A Military Cross awarded during World War II. The Military Cross was awarded to 41 CANLOAN officers during the war.

The British War Office emphasized to Canadian Military Headquarters that its recruits for CANLOAN be drawn from volunteers in the Canadian Army. Conversely, Canadian Military Headquarters emphasized the need for a portion of officers selected to be French Canadian. Both sides largely acquiesced to the other request, although French Canadian officers selected for CANLOAN were required to be proficient in the English language.

In total, 673 officers from the Canadian Army, including 623 infantry officers and 50 ordnance officers served with the British Army under the CANLOAN program. The majority of volunteers were lieutenants, with the program averaging seven lieutenants for every captain that volunteered. Although CANLOAN involved mostly junior officers, several majors from the Canadian Army also volunteered for the program. There were 160 members of the CANLOAN program that previously held an enlisted rank before receiving their officers' commission and joining the CANLOAN program.

Several military decorations were awarded to CANLOAN officers, with CANLOAN officers accruing 41 Military Crosses (one with bar), one Distinguished Service Cross, and one Order of the British Empire while serving with a British regiment. CANLOAN officers were also awarded foreign military decorations, including four Croix de Guerre from France, one Bronze Lion from the Netherlands, and one Silver Star from the United States.

=== Casualties ===
The CANLOAN program sustained a high casualty rate of 69 per cent; with 128 officers killed in action or died of wounds from combat, 310 officers wounded in action, and 27 officers were captured. Several officers that sustained wounds returned to active duty with new regiments through the British Army's reinforcement stream. The majority of the deaths sustained by CANLOAN occurred during Operation Overlord, with 75 officers killed in the operation by the end of August 1944.

== Legacy ==
On 3 June 1961, the CANLOAN Memorial was unveiled by Georges Vanier, the Governor General of Canada, in Ottawa, situated near the Ottawa River and Sussex Drive. Funds for the memorial were collected from the governments of Canada and the United Kingdom, British Army units that included CANLOAN officers, and the CANLOAN Army Officers' Association. The CANLOAN Army Officers' Association was an association made up of former CANLOAN officer formed after the Second World War; with Milton Fowler Gregg named the association's first honorary president. Since the memorial was erected, ceremonies have been held at the memorial annually on 6 June, to commemorate of the Normandy landings; and on 11 November for Remembrance Day. In 2005, a plaque and tree were installed on the grounds of Earnscliffe, the residence for the British High Commissioner to Canada, in honour of the CANLOAN program and its participants.

In 1968, former CANLOAN officers undertook a 22-day "pilgrimage" to the United Kingdom, and were received and honoured by the Royal Family in St. James Palace, their former regiments, and officials from the City of London and other European governments.

Several items from CANLOAN officers are held in the collections of the Canadian War Museum; including the berets of two CANLOAN officers while they were with British airborne units.

== See also ==
- Exchange officer
- Military history of Canada during World War II
- Military history of the United Kingdom during World War II

== Bibliography ==
- Delaney, Douglas E. (2018). The Imperial Army Project: Britain and the Land Forces of the Dominions and India, 1902–1945. Oxford University Press. ISBN 978-0-19-100965-5.
- Godefroy, Andrew B. (2009). "For Queen, King and Empire: Canadians recruited into the British Army, 1858–1944". Journal of the Society for Army Historical Research. 87 (350): 135–149. JSTOR 44232821.
- Grint, K. (2007). Leadership, Management and Command: Rethinking D-Day. Springer. ISBN 978-0-23-059050-2.
- Hayes, Geoffrey (2017). Crerar's Lieutenants: Inventing the Canadian Junior Army Officer, 1939–45. University of British Columbia Press. ISBN 978-0-77-483486-5.
- Smith, Wilfred I. (1992). Code Word CANLOAN. University of Michigan Press. ISBN 978-1-55-002167-7.
- Wyczynski, Michel (2001). "Canadian War Museum's Airborne Beret Collection". Material Culture Review. 53. ISSN 1927-9264.
