= George Robert Smith (Canadian politician) =

Canadian politician

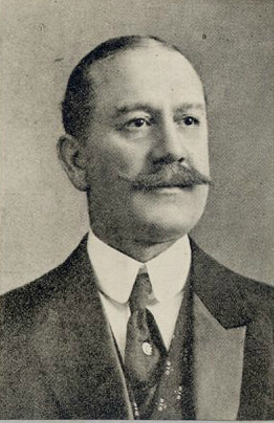

Member of the Legislative Assembly of Quebec for Mégantic
- In office 1897–1908
- Preceded by: James King
- Succeeded by: David Henry Pennington

Member of the Legislative Council of Quebec for Victoria
- In office 1911–1922
- Preceded by: James Kewley Ward
- Succeeded by: Henry Miles

Personal details
- Born: February 17, 1860 Newark, New Jersey
- Died: February 20, 1922 (aged 62) Sherbrooke, Quebec
- Party: Liberal

Military service
- Allegiance: Canada
- Branch/service: Canadian Militia
- Rank: Major
- Unit: 11th Hussars

George Robert Smith (February 17, 1860 – February 20, 1922) was a Canadian politician.

== Biography ==
Born in Newark, New Jersey, Smith emigrated to Canada in 1876. He was a co-founder and president of the Canadian Mining Institute. He was president of Canadian Auto and Taxicab and was a member of the Montreal Board of Trade.

Smith served in the Canadian Militia as a Major with the Richmond based 11th Hussars in command of a Squadron.

He was elected to the Legislative Assembly of Quebec for Mégantic in 1897. A Liberal, he was acclaimed in 1900 and re-elected in 1904. He was defeated in 1908. He was appointed to the Legislative Council of Quebec for Victoria in 1911. He died in office in Sherbrooke, Quebec in 1922.
