= 11th Hussars (Canada) =

- Active: 1866-1936
- Country: Canada
- Branch: Canadian Militia
- Type: Hussars
- Role: Regiment of cavalry
- Part of: Non-Permanent Active Militia
- Garrison/HQ: Richmond, Quebec
- Motto(s): Steady

The 11th Hussars was a light cavalry regiment of the Non-Permanent Active Militia of the Canadian Militia (now the Canadian Army). First raised in 1866 as an infantry regiment in the Eastern Townships of Quebec, in 1903 the regiment was converted to cavalry. In 1936, the 11th Hussars were amalgamated with the 7th Hussars to form the 7th/11th Hussars (now The Sherbrooke Hussars).

== Lineage ==
=== 11th Hussars ===
- Originated on 21 September 1866, in Sherbrooke, Quebec, as the Sherbrooke Battalion of Infantry.
- Redesignated on 15 March 1867, as the 53rd Sherbrooke Battalion of Infantry.
- Reorganized on 22 March 1867, as two separate battalions: the 54th Sherbrooke Battalion of Infantry (later The Sherbrooke Regiment) and the 53rd Melbourne Battalion of Infantry.
- Redesignated on 10 May 1867, as the 54th Richmond Battalion of Infantry.
- Redesignated on 8 May 1900, as the 54th Richmond Regiment.
- Converted to cavalry on 1 August 1903, and redesignated as the 11th Hussars.
- Amalgamated on 1 April 1936, with the 7th Hussars and redesignated as the 7th/11th Hussars.

== History ==
=== 54th Richmond Regiment ===
On 22 March 1867, the 53rd Sherbrooke Battalion of Infantry was reorganized into two separate battalions: the 54th Sherbrooke Battalion of Infantry (later the Sherbrooke Regiment) and the 53rd Melbourne Battalion of Infantry was authorized. The new regiment had companies at Danville, Melbourne, Richmond, Brompton and Durham.

On 10 May 1867, the regiment was redesignated as the 54th Richmond Battalion of Infantry.

On 8 May 1900, the regiment was redesignated as the 54th Richmond Regiment.

=== 11th Hussars ===
On 1 August 1903, the 54th Richmond Regiment was converted from infantry to cavalry and redesignated as the 11th Hussars.

With the outbreak of the First World War, the 11th Hussars along with the 7th Hussars provided volunteers help raise the 5th Canadian Mounted Rifles for service with the Canadian Expeditionary Force.

On 1 April 1936, as a result of the 1936 Canadian Militia reorganization, the 11th Hussars were amalgamated with the 7th Hussars to form the 7th/11th Hussars, which now form part of The Sherbrooke Hussars.

== Battle honours ==
The regiment had no battle honours. However, at the same time as the 1936 amalgamation, the perpetuation of the 5th Canadian Mounted Rifles Battalion, CEF, was transferred from the Eastern Townships Mounted Rifles to the 7th/11th Hussars, which thus acquired several battle honours through the perpetuation.

== Notable members ==
- Lieutenant-Colonel Jean-Marie-Joseph-Pantaléon Pelletier
- Major George Robert Smith

== See also ==
- List of regiments of cavalry of the Canadian Militia (1900–1920)
