= 7th Hussars (Canada) =

- Active: 1867-1936
- Country: Canada
- Branch: Canadian Militia
- Type: Hussars
- Role: Regiment of cavalry
- Part of: Non-Permanent Active Militia
- Garrison/HQ: Bishop's Crossing, Quebec

The 7th Hussars was a light cavalry regiment of the Non-Permanent Active Militia of the Canadian Militia (now the Canadian Army). First raised in 1867 as an infantry regiment in the Eastern Townships of Quebec, in 1903 the regiment was converted to cavalry. In 1936, the 7th Hussars were amalgamated with the 11th Hussars to form the 7th/11th Hussars. On 15 February 1965, the 7th/11th Hussars amalgamated with the Sherbrooke Regiment to form The Sherbrooke Hussars.

== Lineage ==
=== 7th Hussars ===
- Originated on 11 October 1867 in Robinson, Quebec, as the 58th Compton Battalion of Infantry.
- Redesignated on 8 May 1900 as the 58th Compton Regiment.
- Converted to cavalry on 1 May 1903 and redesignated as the 7th Hussars.
- Amalgamated on 1 April 1936 with the 11th Hussars and redesignated as the 7th/11th Hussars.

== History ==
=== 58th Compton Regiment ===
On 11 October 1867, the 58th Compton Battalion of Infantry was authorized. The regiment had companies at Bury (Robinson), Gould, Winslow (Stornaway), Marbleton, Lake Megantic, Compton, Coaticook and Stanstead.

On 8 May 1900, the regiment was redesignated as the 58th Compton Regiment.

=== 7th Hussars ===
On 1 May 1903, the 58th Compton Regiment was converted from infantry to cavalry and redesignated as the 7th Hussars.

With the outbreak of the First World War, the 7th Hussars along with the 11th Hussars provided volunteers to help raise the 5th Canadian Mounted Rifles for service with the Canadian Expeditionary Force.

On 1 April 1936, as a result of the 1936 Canadian Militia reorganization, the 7th Hussars were amalgamated with the 11th Hussars to form the 7th/11th Hussars.

== Organization ==
=== 7th Hussars (1900–1920) ===
- Regimental Headquarters (Bishop's Crossing, now known as Bishopton)
- A Squadron (Bishop's Crossing)
- B Squadron (Bury)
- C Squadron (Scotstown)
- D Squadron (Cookshire)

== Alliances ==
- 7th Queen's Own Hussars (Until 1936)

== Battle honours ==
The regiment had no battle honours. However, at the same time as the 1936 amalgamation, the perpetuation of the 5th Canadian Mounted Rifles Battalion, CEF, was transferred from the Eastern Townships Mounted Rifles to the 7th/11th Hussars, which thus acquired several battle honours through the perpetuation.

== See also ==
- List of regiments of cavalry of the Canadian Militia (1900–1920)
