= Sherbrooke Regiment =

The Sherbrooke Regiment
- Active: 1866–1965
- Country: Canada
- Branch: Canadian Militia (1866–1940); Canadian Army (1940–1965)
- Type: Line infantry
- Role: Infantry (1866–1946); Armoured (1946–1965)
- Size: One regiment
- Part of: Non-Permanent Active Militia (1866–1940); Canadian Infantry Corps (1942–1946); Royal Canadian Armoured Corps (1942–1945, 1946–1965)
- Garrison/HQ: Sherbrooke, Quebec
- Motto: In hoc signo vinces (Latin for 'In this sign thou shalt conquer')
- Engagements: First World War; Second World War
- Battle honours: See #Battle honours

The Sherbrooke Regiment was a regiment of the Canadian Militia and later the Canadian Army Reserve that existed from 1866 to 1965. Originally an infantry regiment, during the Second World War the regiment helped form the 27th Armoured Regiment (The Sherbrooke Fusilier Regiment), which was an armoured (tank) unit in the 2nd Canadian Armoured Brigade. In 1946, the regiment itself was converted to an armoured regiment was redesignated as The Sherbrooke Regiment (RCAC). In 1965, the regiment was amalgamated with the 7th/11th Hussars to form The Sherbrooke Hussars.

== Lineage ==
=== The Sherbrooke Regiment (RCAC) ===
- Originated on 21 September 1866, in Melbourne, Canada East, as the Sherbrooke Battalion of Infantry.
- Redesignated on 15 March 1867, as the 53rd Sherbrooke Battalion of Infantry.
- Reorganized on 22 March 1867, as two separate battalions: the 53rd Melbourne Battalion of Infantry (later the 11th Hussars) and the 54th Sherbrooke Battalion of Infantry.
- Redesignated on 10 May 1867, as the 53rd Sherbrooke Battalion of Infantry (designations of veterans at time of Fenian Raids 1866 and 1870):
  - Sherbrooke Rifle Company, later No. 1 Coy, 53rd Sherbrooke Battalion
  - 2nd Sherbrooke Rifle Company, later No. 2 Coy, 53rd Battalion
  - Danville Rifle Company, later 53rd Battalion
  - Lennoxville Infantry Company, later 53rd Battalion
  - Melbourne Infantry Company
  - Richmond Infantry Company
  - Danville Rifle Company, later 53rd Battalion
  - Sherbrooke Battery of Garrison Artillery, later No.6 Company, 53rd Sherbrooke Battalion.
- Redesignated on 8 May 1900, as the 53rd Sherbrooke Regiment.
- Redesignated on 29 March 1920, as The Sherbrooke Regiment.
- Redesignated on 15 December 1936, as The Sherbrooke Regiment (MG).
- Redesignated on 1 February 1941, as The Sherbrooke Regiment.
- Redesignated on 7 November 1940, as the 2nd (Reserve) Battalion, The Sherbrooke Regiment.
- Redesignated on 1 April 1946, as the 12th Armoured Regiment (Sherbrooke Regiment), RCAC.
- Redesignated on 4 February 1949, as The Sherbrooke Regiment (12th Armoured Regiment).
- Redesignated on 19 May 1958, as The Sherbrooke Regiment (RCAC).
- Amalgamated on 15 February 1965, with the 7th/11th Hussars, and redesignated as The Sherbrooke Hussars.

== Perpetuations ==
=== Great War ===
- 117th (Eastern Townships) Battalion, CEF

=== Second World War ===
- The Sherbrooke Fusilier Regiment

== History ==
=== Early history ===
With the passing of the Militia Act of 1855, the first of a number of newly raised independent militia companies were established in and around the Eastern Townships region of Canada East (now the Province of Quebec).

On 21 September 1866, the Sherbrooke Battalion of Infantry was authorized for service by the regimentation of six of these previously authorized independent militia rifle and infantry companies. The battalion's headquarters was at Melbourne and had companies at Sherbrooke, Danville, Melbourne (Kingsbury), Richmond and Lennoxville.

On 15 March 1867, the battalion was reorganized as the 53rd Sherbrooke Battalion of Infantry. On 22 March 1867, the battalion was redesignated as the 54th Sherbrooke Battalion of Infantry and again on 10 May 1867, as the 53rd Sherbrooke Battalion of Infantry.

On 8 May 1900, the 53rd Sherbrooke Battalion of Infantry was redesignated as the 53rd Sherbrooke Regiment.

=== First World War ===
On 6 August 1914, Details of the 53rd Sherbrooke Regiment were placed on active service for local protective duty.

With the formation of the Canadian Expeditionary Force, the regiment provided volunteers for the 12th Battalion, CEF, which sailed to the United Kingdom as part of the First Contingent (later the 1st Canadian Division).

On 22 December 1915, the 117th (Eastern Townships) Battalion, CEF was authorized for service, and on 14 August 1916 the battalion embarked for Great Britain. After its arrival in the UK, the battalion provided reinforcements for the Canadian Corps in the field. On 8 January 1917, the battalion's personnel were absorbed by the 23rd Reserve Battalion, CEF. On 30 August 1920, the 117th Battalion, CEF was disbanded.

=== 1920s-1930s ===
On 1 April 1920, as a result of the Otter Commission and the following post-war reorganization of the militia, the 53rd Sherbrooke Regiment was redesignated as The Sherbrooke Regiment and was reorganized with two battalions (one of them a paper-only reserve battalion) to perpetuate the assigned war-raised battalions of the Canadian Expeditionary Force.

As a result of the 1936 Canadian Militia reorganization, on 15 December 1936, The Sherbrooke Regiment was converted to an infantry machine gun battalion and was redesignated as The Sherbrooke Regiment (Machine Gun).

== Organization ==
=== Sherbrooke Battalion of Infantry (21 September 1866) ===
- Regimental HQ (Melbourne)
- No. 1 Company (Sherbrooke) (first raised on 20 March 1856 as the 1st Volunteer Militia Rifle Company of Sherbrooke)
- No. 2 Company (Sherbrooke) (first raised on 13 November 1860 as the 2nd Volunteer Militia Rifle Company of Sherbrooke)
- No. 3 Company (Danville) (first raised on 17 July 1861 as the First Volunteer Militia Rifle Company of Danville)
- No. 4 Company (Melbourne) (first raised on 16 March 1866 as the Melbourne Infantry Company)
- No. 5 Company (Richmond) (first raised on 16 March 1866 as the Richmond Infantry Company)
- No. 6 Company (Lennoxville) (first raised on 2 June 1866 as the Lennoxville Infantry Company)

=== The Sherbrooke Regiment (15 September 1921) ===
- 1st Battalion (perpetuating the 117th Battalion, CEF)
- 2nd (Reserve) Battalion

== Alliances ==
- United Kingdom - The Royal Leicestershire Regiment (until 1964)

== Battle honours ==
=== Great War ===
- Arras, 1917, '18 (Note: "Arras, 1917" selected to be borne on colours and appointments)
- Hill 70
- Ypres, 1917
- Amiens (Note: Selected to be borne on colours and appointments)

=== Second World War ===
- Normandy Landing
- Authie
- Caen
- The Orne
- Bourguébus Ridge
- Faubourg de Vaucelles
- St. André-sur-Orne
- Falaise
- Falaise Road
- Clair Tizon
- The Laison
- Antwerp–Turnhout Canal
- The Scheldt
- The Lower Maas
- The Rhineland
- The Hochwald
- Xanten
- The Rhine
- Emmerich–Hoch Elten
- Zutphen, Deventer
- North-West Europe, 1944–1945

== Notable members ==
- Major General Sir Frederick Oscar Warren Loomis, KCB CMG DSO
- Brigadier-General Sydney Valpy Radley-Walters CMM DSO MC CD
- Captain The Reverend Walter Brown
- Major Edson Warner CD
- Major Robert Gilmour Leckie
- David Price
