= Canadian Forces Small Arms Concentration =

The logo of the Canadian Armed Forces Small Arms Concentration and Canadian Army Skill-At-Arms Meeting.

The Canadian Armed Forces Small Arms Concentration (CAFSAC) and the Canadian Army Skill at Arms Meeting (CASAM) is a series of shooting matches conducted annually by the Canadian Forces at the Connaught Ranges and Primary Training Centre, located near Shirley's Bay in Ottawa, Ontario. The matches were preceded by the Dominion of Canada Rifle Association (DCRA) National Service Arms Competition, also conducted annually at Connaught Ranges, and were the latest iteration of a series of Canadian shooting competitions dating back to 1869 until 2019.

== Background ==
Petty Officer First Class Martin Cashin is "chaired off" the field after winning the Queen's Medal for Champion Shot (Regular Force) at the 2009 CF Small Arms Competition.

The stated aim of CAFSAC is "to encourage operationally relevant marksmanship through competition and professional development."

CAFSAC is open to teams of competitors from both the Regular Force and Primary Reserve Force of the Canadian Army (including the Canadian Rangers), Royal Canadian Navy, Royal Canadian Air Force, and the Royal Canadian Mounted Police as well as selected international teams and domestic police. The competition includes individual and team matches in Service Rifle (SR) and Combat Pistol (CP), with the Light Machine Gun (LMG) only used to compete in the Soldier's Cup match). CAFSAC also determines the annual winners of the Queen's Medal for Champion Shot for the Regular Force of the Canadian Forces and for the Primary Reserve or RCMP. As well, the matches are used to select the team that will represent the Canadian Armed Forces at the British Army's Central Skill at Arms Meeting (CENTSAM), conducted annually at Bisley, Surrey. Since unification of the Canadian Forces in 1968, the Queen's Medals have predominately been won by members of the Canadian Army. Between 2009 and 2019, the Canadian Army and the Royal Canadian Air Force each won five Regular Force Queen's Medal and the Royal Canadian Navy won one. The Regular Force Queens' Medalist for 2009 was a member of the Royal Canadian Navy and the Regular Force Queens' Medalists for 2011, 2012, 2013, 2016, and 2018 were officers of the Royal Canadian Air Force.

The matches were initially conducted by the DCRA. The Canadian Forces assumes responsibility for the matches for a four-year period during the 1970s, before handing the matches back to the DCRA. In the late 1980s, the Canadian Forces again assumed responsibility for CFSAC (then the Canadian Forces Small Arms Competition). The competition was suspended for a few years in the early 2000s. Recently, it has undergone significant changes to make it more operationally relevant to modern soldiers, sailors, airmen and airwomen.

Competitors must use issued equipment and accessories and specialized items such as shooting gloves or target rifle slings are not permitted. The matches are conducted in what is referred to as "Full Fighting Order," which consists of tactical vest (with kit), helmet, ballistic eyewear and hearing protection.

== Matches ==
Matches 11 to 17 are Service Rifle matches, Matches 21 to 26 are Combat Pistol Matches and Matches 31-34 are Canadian Army Skill At Arms Meeting matches.

=== Match 11 - Normandy ===
Match 11 - Normandy, is a five-stage, 52-round service rifle match with deliberate shooting, snap shooting against moving targets and a run-down conducted in the prone, kneeling and standing positions at 200 and 100 metres.

=== Match 12 - Defence of Canada ===
Match 12 - Defence of Canada, is a six-stage, 60-round snap, and snap movers service rifle match conducted in the standing and kneeling positions at 100, 75, 50, and 25 metres.

=== Match 13 - Vimy ===
Match 13 - Vimy, is a five-stage, 52-round service rifle match comprising deliberate, rapid fire, snap shooting and snap shooting against moving targets with two run-downs conducted at 300, 200 and 100 metres.

=== Match 14 - Pursuit to Mons ===
Match 14 - Pursuit to Mons, is a five-stage, 52-round deliberate and snap-shooting service rifle match with run-downs that begins at the 500-metre firing point and proceeds down-range to the 100 meter firing point. There are a number of required shooting position changes and competitors engage targets in the standing, prone and kneeling positions engaging targets at each firing point.

=== Match 15 - Stage 2 Queen's Medal for Champion Shot ===
Competitors for Match 15 - Stage 2 Queen's Medal for Champion Shot are selected based on their scores in Stage 1 (Matches 11 through 14). It is a five-stage, 52-round service rifle match from 500 to 100 metres in the standing, kneeling and prone positions with run-downs that is a repeat of Match 14 - Pursuit to Mons. The winners of the Queen's Medal for Champion Shot are known at the end of this match and the two winners are "chaired" off the range by their fellow shooters.

=== Match 16 - Canadian Ranger Open ===
Match 16 - Canadian Ranger Open is open only to members of the Canadian Rangers and may be shot with either the current C7-series service rifle or with the .303 Lee–Enfield Number 4 Mark 1 bolt-action service rifle that is the standard-issue weapon of the Canadian Rangers. It is a three-stage, 36-round deliberate-fire service rifle match conducted at 600, 500 and 400 metres. It is the longest-range rifle match at CFSAC.

=== Match 17 - The International ===
Match 17 - The International is a five-stage, 52-round service rifle match with deliberate shooting, snap shooting and snap shooting against moving targets from 400 to 100 metres with run-downs, shot in the prone position.

=== Match 21 - Basic ===
Match 21 - Basic is a five-stage, 56-round combat pistol match with deliberate, rapid and snap shooting, an emergency magazine change and fire and movement in the standing and kneeling positions from 25, 20, 15 and 10 metres.

=== Match 22 - Advanced ===
Match 22 - Advanced is a four-stage, 48-round combat pistol match with deliberate and "double tap" shooting, an emergency magazine change and fire and movement in the standing and kneeling positions from 25, 20, 15 and 10 metres.

=== Match 23 - Qualifier ===
Match 23 - Qualifier Match 21 - Basic is a five-stage, 40-round combat pistol match with deliberate, rapid and rapid fire while moving in the standing, kneeling and prone positions from 25, 20, 15, 10 and 5 metres.

=== Matches 24 - 26 ===
Matches 24, 25 and 26 are combat pistol matches that are changed annually and are kept secret from the competitors until they arrive at the range to commence the matches.

=== Match 31 - Soldiers' Cup ===
Match 31 - Soldiers' Cup is the centre-piece of the Canadian Army Skill At Arms Meeting and is a service rifle and light machine gun match starts with a 3.6 kilometre run that includes an obstacle course prior to commencing the shoot. The section of eight soldiers (six with rifles and 70 rounds of ammunition, two with LMGs and 140 rounds of ammunition) then shoots a snap-shooting match with run downs that commences at the 500-metre firing point and advances to the 25-metre firing point.

=== Match 32 - Assault Group CASEVAC ===
Match 32 - Assault Group CASEVAC is a Canadian Army Skill At Arms Meeting match that requires a fire group of four soldiers to evacuate a casualty on a stretcher from the 500 metre point through three obstacles to the 400 metre firing point. At the 400-metre firing point, four riflemen, each with two X 5-round magazines, will engage reactive targets. Scoring is "all targets down the fastest with highest number of rounds remaining."

=== Match 33 - Service Rifle Falling Plates ===
Match 33 - Service Rifle Falling Plates is a four-competitor, elimination heat match where the team commences at the 300 metre firing point, runs down to the 200 metre firing point and engages 10 12 inch X 12 inch steel falling plates. The first team to shoot all the plates down wins the heat.

=== Match 34 - Combat Pistol Falling Plates ===
Match 34 - Combat Pistol Falling Plates is a four-competitor, elimination heat match where the team commences at the 30 metre firing point, runs down to the 10 metre firing point and engages 12 12 inch X 12 inch wooden falling plates. The first team to shoot all the plates down wins the heat.

== Trophies and Prizes ==
The Queen's Medal for Champion Shot.

=== Queen's Medal for Champion Shot ===
Two Queen's Medal for Champion Shot are awarded annually since 1991: one to a member of the Canadian Forces (Regular) and one to a member of the Canadian Forces (Reserve) or the Royal Canadian Mounted Police who obtains the highest aggregate score in stages one and two of the Queen's Medal Competition. A comprehensive list of Regular Force winners can be viewed at Canada - Regular Forces and Reserve Force / RCMP at Canada - Militia/Reserve/RCMP

=== The Letson Trophy ===
The Letson Trophy is awarded to the Regular Force 12-competitor rifle team with the highest aggregate score. Winning team members will wear the Letson rifle pin on their service dress uniform for the remainder of their careers. The trophy is named in honour of Major General Harry Letson.

=== The Clarence R. Smith Trophy ===
The Clarence R. Smith Trophy is awarded to the Reserve Force 12-competitor rifle team with the highest aggregate score. Winning team members will wear the Smith rifle pin on their service dress uniform for the remainder of their careers.

=== Allard Trophy ===
Highest team aggregate score for a four-person Regular Force combat pistol team for Stage 2 (Matches 24-26).

=== Royal Montreal Regiment Trophy ===
Highest team aggregate score for a four-person Reserve Force combat pistol team for Stage 2 (Matches 24-26).

=== Mobile Command Championship Minor Unit Team Pistol Trophy ===
Highest team aggregate score for a four-person open combat pistol team for Stage 2 (Matches 24-26).

=== Canadian Ranger National Authority Trophy ===
Highest team aggregate score for a four-person Canadian Ranger service rifle team.

=== The Belzile Trophy ===
The highest-scoring individual Canadian Ranger in Stage 1 of the Queen's Medal competition.

=== Martin Trophy ===
Awarded to the top Regular Force pistol shot.

=== Fox-Decent Trophy ===
Awarded to the top Reserve Force pistol shot.

=== LKOL Van Helden Trophy ===
Awarded to the top pistol shot in the open category.

=== International Practical Shooting Confederation Cup ===
Awarded to the top tyro (novice) pistol shot.

=== Service Rifle Aggregate Champion Trophy by Frontline ===
Awarded for the team aggregate in the service rifle falling plates match in the open category.

=== Service Rifle Aggregate Champion Trophy by Armament Technologies ===
Awarded for the team match in the service rifle falling plates match in the open category.

=== The Ranger Cup ===
Awarded for the team match in the service rifle falling plates match for Canadian Rangers.

=== Soldiers Cup ===
Awarded for the winning eight-member team in Match 31 - Soldiers' Cup.

=== Major Edson Warner Trophy by NORLEANS ===
Awarded for the winning team in Match 32 - Assault Group CASEVAC.

=== Army Training Authority Cup ===
Aggregate 12-member team score in Matches 31 to 34.

=== Service Rifle and Combat Pistol Combined Fire Championship Trophy ===
Awarded to the individual with the greatest combined service rifle and combat pistol scores.

=== The Squad Competition Trophy ===
Awarded to the winning team in Match 17 - The International.

=== Ranger Baton ===
Awarded to the individual winner of Match 16 - Canadian Ranger Open.

=== 5 Canadian Ranger Patrol Group Tyro Trophy ===
Awarded to the top tyro (novice) Canadian Ranger rifle shot in Matches 11 to 15.

=== Colt Canada trophy (Diemaco) ===
Awarded to the top tyro (novice) rifle shot in Matches 11 to 15.

=== The Top Ranger CRPG Trophy ===
Awarded to the top-scoring eight-member Canadian Ranger team in Matches 12, 13 and 16.

=== The Lt K Ferguson Trophy ===
Awarded for the aggregate top shooter in the open category in Matches 11 to 15.
