= 117th (Eastern Townships) Battalion, CEF =

The 117th (Eastern Townships) Battalion, CEF was a unit in the Canadian Expeditionary Force during the First World War. Based in Sherbrooke, Quebec, the unit began recruiting in late 1915 through the eastern counties of Quebec. After sailing to England on SS Empress of Britain from Halifax on August 14, 1916, the battalion was absorbed into the 23rd Reserve Battalion on January 8, 1917. Through the 23rd Battalion, it is linked to The Royal Montreal Regiment. During its time in England, it became the first foreign unit to mount a King's or Queen's Guard at Buckingham Palace, with Canada having mounted the most guards of any foreign country since then.

The 117th (Eastern Townships) Battalion, CEF had one Officer Commanding: Lieutenant-Colonel Levi Jerome Gilbert. Gilbert had served 15 years with the 58th Regiment and 12 years with the 7th Hussars. He left the military when the battalion disappeared in 1917.
