= Charles Smith Rutherford =

Canadian Victoria Cross recipient (1892–1989)

Charles Smith Rutherford VC MC MM
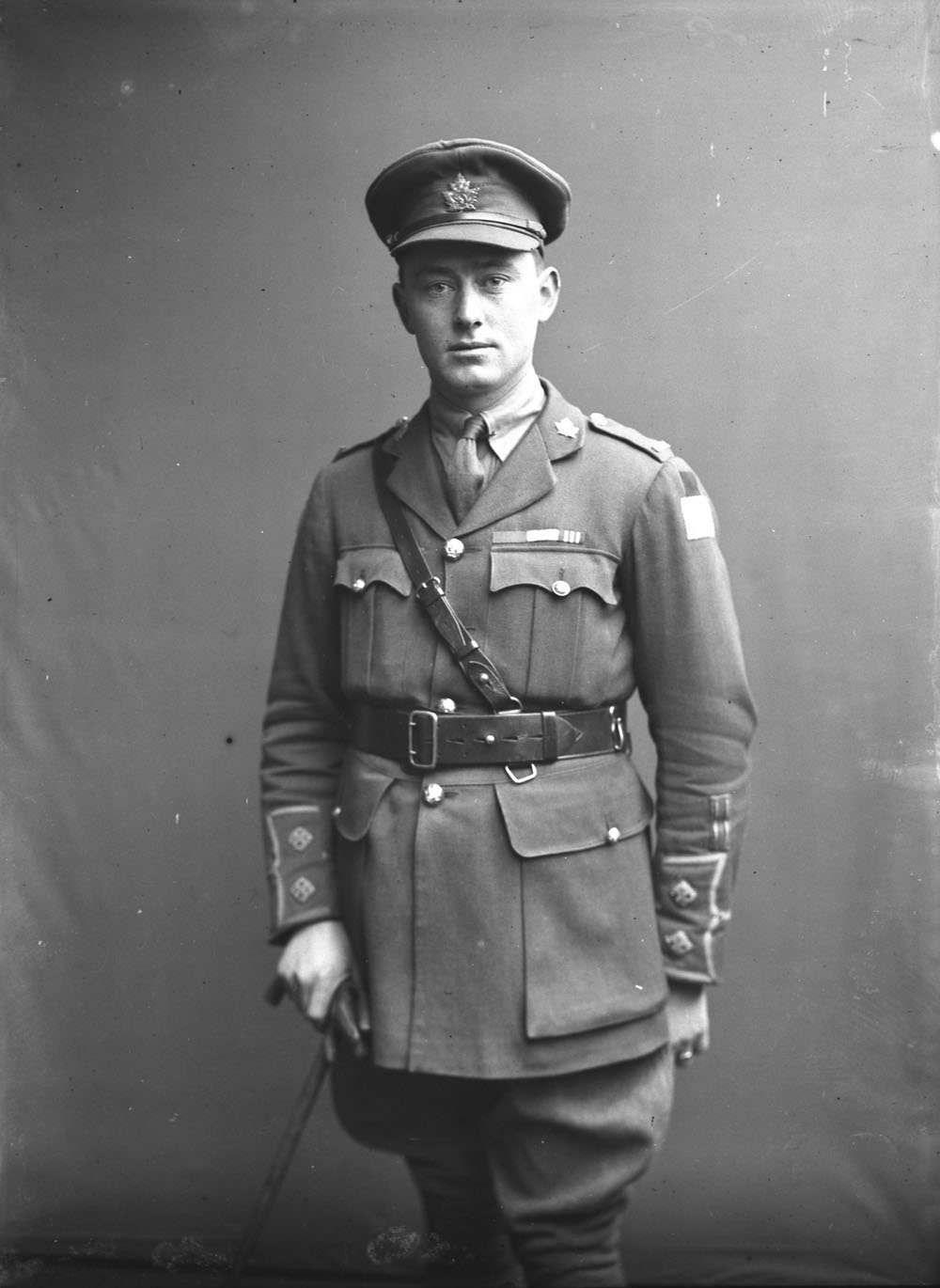
- Rutherford in c. 1919
- Born: 9 February 1892; Colborne, Ontario, Canada
- Died: 11 June 1989 (aged 97); Ottawa, Ontario, Canada
- Burial place: Union Cemetery, Colborne
- Military career
- Allegiance: Canada
- Branch: Canadian Expeditionary Force; Veterans Guard of Canada
- Service years: 1916–1919; 1940–1945
- Rank: Captain
- Units: 5th Battalion, Canadian Mounted Rifles
- Conflicts: First World War
- Awards: Victoria Cross; Military Cross; Military Medal
- Other work: Sergeant-at-Arms of the Ontario Legislature (1934–39)

Charles Smith Rutherford, VC, MC, MM (9 February 1892 – 11 June 1989) was a Canadian soldier and a recipient of the Victoria Cross, the highest award for gallantry in the face of the enemy that can be awarded to British and Commonwealth forces.

== Early years ==
Rutherford was born on a farm in Colborne, Ontario, on 9 January 1892. He joined The Queen's Own Rifles of Canada in 1916 and was posted to the 5th Battalion, Canadian Mounted Rifles, CEF.

== First World War ==
Rutherford began his service in the ranks, and as a sergeant was awarded the Military Medal on 23 February 1918. After being commissioned, he was also awarded the Military Cross, the full citation was published in a supplement to the London Gazette of 10 January 1919, reading:

As our right flank was "in the air" for over 4,000 yards, this officer was detailed with his platoon and a Tank to clear up a village. This he did most successfully, killing a large number of the enemy and taking several prisoners. The coolness and determination which he displayed in clearing up the village and his marked control over his men at all times cannot be too highly commended.

Rutherford was 26 years old serving in the Battle of the Scarpe near Monchy, France, when he was awarded the Victoria Cross. On 26 August 1918, while commanding an assaulting party, he found himself a considerable distance ahead of his men and at the same moment saw a fully armed strong enemy party outside a pill-box in front of him. By masterly bluff, he managed to persuade the enemy that they were surrounded and the whole party of 45, including two officers and three machine-guns, surrendered. The lieutenant then observed that gunfire from another pill-box was holding up the assault, so with a Lewis gun section he attacked it capturing another 35 prisoners and their guns. The full citation was published in a supplement to the London Gazette of 12 November 1918 (dated 15 November 1918):

For most conspicuous bravery, initiative and devotion to duty. When in command of an assaulting party Lt. Rutherford found himself a considerable distance ahead of his men, and at the same moment observed a fully armed strong enemy party outside a "Pill Box" ahead of him. He beckoned to them with his revolver to come to him, in return they waved to him to come to them. This he boldly did, and informed them that they were prisoners. This fact an enemy officer disputed and invited Lt. Rutherford to enter the "Pill Box", an invitation he discreetly declined. By masterly bluff, however, he persuaded the enemy that they were surrounded, and the whole party of 45, including two officers and three machine guns, surrendered to him.

Subsequently, he induced the enemy officer to stop the fire of an enemy machine-gun close by, and Lt. Rutherford took advantage of the opportunity to hasten the advance of his men to his support.

Lt. Rutherford then observed that the right assaulting party was held up by heavy machine-gun fire from another "Pill Box". Indicating an objective to the remainder of his party he attacked the "Pill Box" with a Lewis gun section and captured a further 35 prisoners with machine guns, thus enabling the party to continue their advance.

The bold and gallant action of this officer contributed very materially to the capture of the main objective and was a wonderful inspiration to all ranks in pressing home the attack on a very strong position.

He later achieved the rank of captain.

== Post-war ==
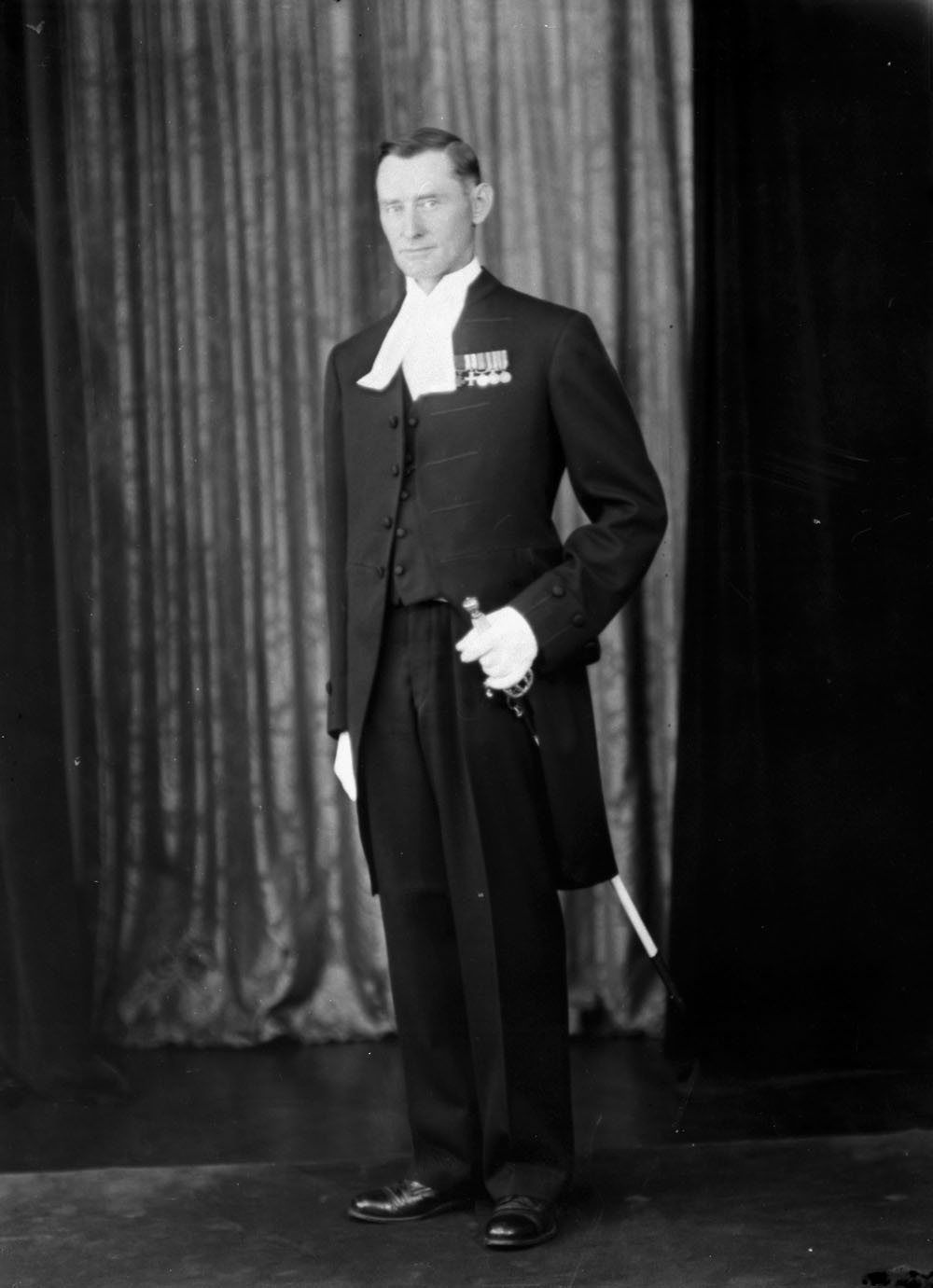
Rutherford as Sergeant-at-Arms for the Ontario Legislature in 1937.

From 1934 to 1940, Rutherford was the Sergeant at Arms of the Ontario Legislature when Mitchell Hepburn was Premier. He was the first sergeant to eject a member of the Legislature.

During the Second World War Rutherford served with the Veterans Guard of Canada, reaching the rank of captain.

C.S. Rutherford was the last recipient of the Victoria Cross from the First World War to die, on 11 June 1989 at the age of 97. He is buried at The Union Cemetery, Colborne, Ontario, Canada.

The location of Rutherford's medals is not public knowledge.
