= Frederick Loomis (Canadian Army officer) =

Canadian First World War general

Major General Sir Frederick Loomis KCB, CMG, DSO & Bar
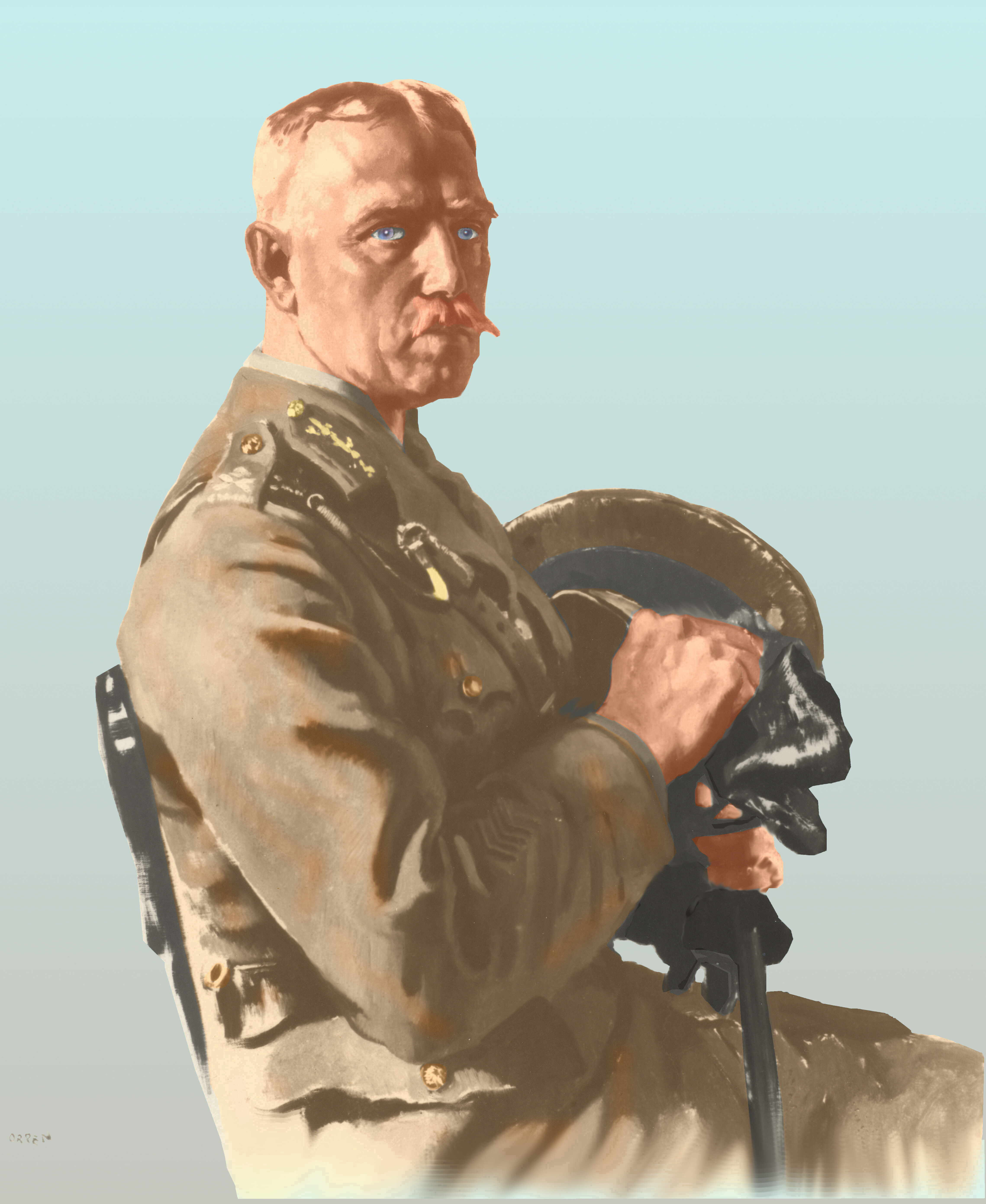
- Born: February 1, 1870; Sherbrooke, Quebec, Canada
- Died: February 15, 1937 (aged 67); Montreal, Quebec, Canada
- Military career
- Allegiance: Canada
- Branch: Canadian Militia
- Service years: 1886–1919
- Rank: Major General
- Commands: 3rd Canadian Division
- Conflicts: First World War
- Awards: Knight Commander of the Order of the Bath; Companion of the Order of St Michael and St George; Distinguished Service Order & Bar; Mentioned in Despatches

Major General Sir Frederick Oscar Warren Loomis, KCB, CMG, DSO & Bar (February 1, 1870 – February 15, 1937) was a Canadian soldier who fought in the First World War.

== Personal life ==
Loomis was educated in Sherbrooke and Lennoxville at Bishop’s College. In 1891 he joined his father's firm D. G. Loomis and Sons, which made bricks, sold building materials, and filled contracts for general construction. In 1903 the family enterprise moved its operations to Montreal. After 1912, he became sole proprietor of the company, by then an important firm undertaking projects across the country.

== Military career ==
He enlisted as a 16-yr old private in 1886 with the 53rd Sherbrooke Battalion of Infantry and was made a provisional lieutenant in 1897. He was commissioned a year later and transferred to 5th Regiment, Royal Highlanders of Canada in Montreal in 1903 and was later promoted to major in 1905.

When the First World War broke out in August 1914, Loomis was aged 44, a family man, prosperous business owner, and a figure on Montreal society. Nevertheless, he promptly enlisted in the Canadian Expeditionary Force. As an officer with considerable experience and connections – and known Conservative loyalties. In one of Sir Samuel Hughes' more inspired selections he promoted Loomis a lieutenant-colonel and appointed him commanding officer of the 13th Infantry Battalion 13th Battalion (Royal Highlanders of Canada), CEF. He left Canada in October 1914. Promoted to the rank of colonel in January 1916, he was given command of a training brigade in England. In March 1916, Loomis was promoted to the temporary rank of brigadier general and took command of the newly formed 7th Canadian Infantry Brigade. In July of that same year, he was appointed to command of the 2nd Canadian Infantry Brigade and would see the brigade through the battles at the Ypres Salient, Somme, Vimy Ridge, Arlleux, Hill 70, and Passchendaele during 1916 and 1917. In 1918 he was engaged in battles at Amiens and Arras. In September 1918, Loomis was promoted to major general and was given command of the 3rd Canadian Division and commanded the division during the last two months of the First World War, leading the division through the Battle of Cambrai and succeeding battles culminating in the capture of Mons on November 11, 1918.

He was knighted by George V in 1919 for his service during the war and retired from the Canada Militia later in May of that year. He was also highly decorated during the war, earning the Distinguished Service Order (DSO) in June 1915 and a bar to his DSO three years later, the citation for which reads:

For great gallantry and brilliant leadership during the operations south-east of Amiens, 8th/9th August, 1918, and east of Arras, 2nd September, 1918. He made reconnaissances under heavy fire, personally superintending the disposition of troops and encouraging all by his coolness and ability. The results achieved by the brigade were of an outstanding nature.

== Honours and legacy ==
On November 11, 2018, the hundredth anniversary of the Armistice with Germany, The Black Watch (Royal Highland Regiment) of Canada, with bagpipes and drums playing, marched through the streets of Mons to the building that was Major-General Frederick Loomis’s headquarters during the First World War. There a ceremony was held for the unveiling of a plaque commemorating this building as the HQ of the 3rd CDN Division.

He is portrayed in a painting by Edgar Bundy on display in the Canadian Senate Chamber, leading the Royal Highlanders of Canada (Canadian Expeditionary Force) into Saint-Nazaire in 1915.

Mount Loomis on the Alberta–British Columbia border is named after him.

== See also ==
- List of Bishop's College School alumni

Military offices
Preceded by Louis Lipsett	GOC 3rd Canadian Division; September–November 1918	Formation disbanded
