= Operation Blockbuster =

1945 battle in Germany during WWII

- Part of the Western Allied invasion of Germany in the Western Front of the European theatre of World War II
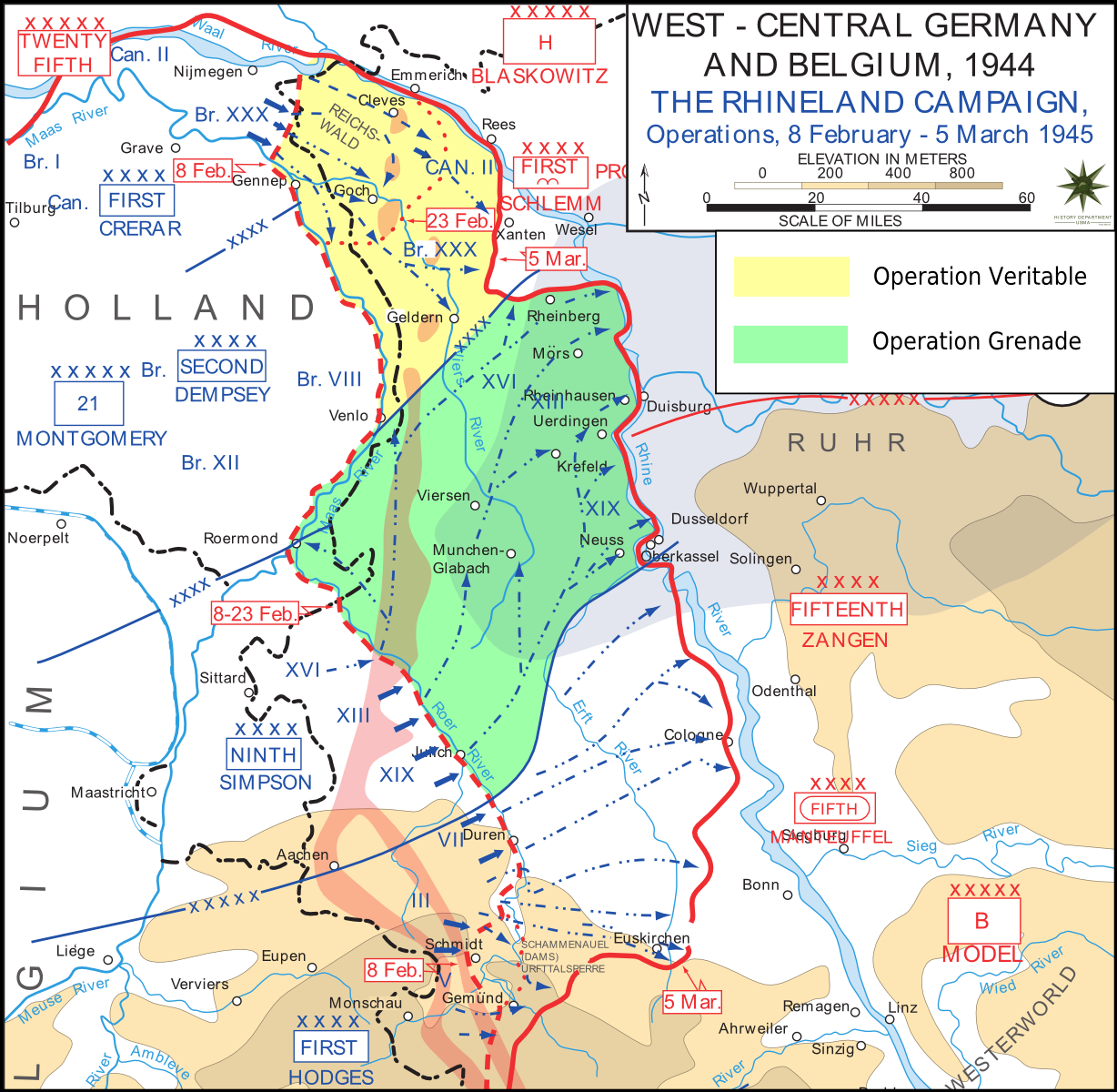
- Operation Blockbuster (yellow)
Date	26 February – 3 March 1945
Location	Lower Rhine region Germany
Result	Allied victory

Belligerents
Canada; United Kingdom	Germany

Commanders and leaders
(Canada) Harry Crerar (United Kingdom) Brian Horrocks	(Germany) Alfred Schlemm

Operation Blockbuster was the completion of the larger Operation Veritable by the First Canadian Army, reinforced by the XXX Corps from the British Second Army from late February to early March, 1945. Veritable had been slower and more costly than expected and the Canadian commander, General Harry Crerar, had decided on a fresh start for the operation. Three British and Canadian divisions advanced south-eastwards, capturing unprepared German positions in the Hochwald forested ridge, before advancing on Xanten. They linked up with the Ninth US Army at Berendonk, near Geldern on 3 March.

Much of the fighting between the Canadians and the Germans took place in wooded areas at close-quarters.

== Battle Honours ==
Attached to the 10th Canadian Infantry Brigade, 4th Canadian (Armoured) Division, the Canadian infantry and armoured regiments to earn battle honours for actions during Operation Blockbuster, emblazoned on their regimental colours as The Hochwald, include:

- Algonquin Regiment
- Argyll and Sutherland Highlanders of Canada
- Lake Superior Regiment (Motor)
- Lincoln and Welland Regiment
- Sherbrooke Fusiliers Regiment
- South Alberta Regiment
- Stormont, Dundas and Glengarry Highlanders
- The South Saskatchewan Regiment
- British Columbia Regiment (Duke of Connaught's Own)

== In popular culture ==
The Battle of the Hochwald Gap is the topic of episode 5 of season 1 of the documentary series Greatest Tank Battles, which first aired in 2010. Veterans on both sides give testimonies on the violence of the campaign. The Canadians in particular speak of the tenacity of German soldiers in the Rhineland, while former German soldiers give testimonies on their own experiences with the Canadians.

== See also ==
- Canada in World War II
