= Battle of the Scarpe =

Battle in the First World War between the British Empire and German Empire

Battle of the Scarpe (1918)
- Part of the Western Front of World War I Hundred Days Offensive : Second Battle of the Somme
Date	26–30 August 1918
Location	Monchy-le-Preux, France 50°16′14″N 02°53′39″E
Result	Canadian Corps victory

Belligerents
British Empire: Canada	German Empire

Commanders and leaders
(United Kingdom of Great Britain and Ireland) Julian Byng (Canada) Arthur Currie	

Casualties and losses
(Canada) : 5,500 casualties	Canadians captured 3,300 prisoners, 53 guns and 519 machine guns

The Battle of the Scarpe was a World War I battle that took place during the Hundred Days Offensive between 26 and 30 August 1918.

== 26 August ==
The Canadian Corps advanced over 5 kilometres and captured the towns of Monchy-le-Preux and Wancourt.

Lieutenant Charles Smith Rutherford VC MC MM from the 5th Canadian Mounted Rifles of the 3rd Canadian Infantry Division performed actions that earned him the Victoria Cross. He captured a German party of 45, including two officers and three machine-guns, then captured another pillbox along with another 35 prisoners and their guns.

== 27 August ==
Heavy rains during the night resulted in slippery ground, difficulties in assembling troops and late starts for the assaults. Stiff resistance from the Germans and their heavily defended positions limited gains to around 3 kilometres.

== 28 August ==
The 2nd and 3rd Canadian Infantry Divisions seized an important portion of the German Fresnes–Rouvroy defence system after three days of intense fighting. Total casualties were reported as 254 officers and 5,547 other ranks. They captured more than 3,300 prisoners, 53 guns and 519 machine guns.

Lieutenant-Colonel William Hew Clark-Kennedy, 24th Battalion, 2nd Canadian Infantry Division, earned a Victoria Cross by personally driving the advance despite being severely wounded, and suffering from intense pain and loss of blood.

Lieutenant-Colonel A. E. G. McKenzie, Commanding Officer of the 26th (New Brunswick) Battalion, was killed during action on 28 August. He was posthumously awarded a bar to his Distinguished Service Order.

== 29 August ==
Brutinel's Brigade, the first fully motorized brigade in the British Empire armies, advanced the front line by approximately one kilometre by seizing Bench Farm and Victoria Copse. The Canadian Corps Cyclist Battalion established posts right up to the Scarpe River.

== 30 August ==
Soldiers from the Canadian Corps cleared portions of the Fresnes–Rouvroy trench system, including Upton Wood. After holding all day under heavy fire, they drove off a German counterattack, capturing 50 prisoners and five machine guns in the process.
