= CFB Toronto =

Airfield and former Canadian Forces base in Ontario

- IATA: none; ICAO: none

Summary
- Opened: 1929
- Closed: April 1, 1996
- Occupants: Royal Canadian Air Force / Canadian Armed Forces
- Coordinates: 43°44′38″N 79°27′56″W
- Interactive map of CFB Toronto

Canadian Forces Base Toronto (also CFB Toronto) is a former Canadian Forces base that operated at the site of Downsview Airport in Toronto, Ontario. The airfield is currently referred to as the 'YZD district' for residential and commercial redevelopment by Northcrest Developments since purchasing property rights of the site on 17 August 2024, following Bombardier's relocation to a new facility at Toronto's Pearson Airport.

== RCAF Station Downsview ==
The Downsview Lands were part of an extensive land parcel acquired by the British Crown in 1787 from the Mississauga Nation in what is referred to as the Toronto Purchase. "Downsview" received its name in the 1830s after a farm on the property that was called "Downs View", attributed to its commanding vista of Lake Ontario to the south, looking "down" from the plateau. In the 1950s, the area was connected with Toronto to the south when Dufferin Street and the Toronto, Simcoe and Huron Railway were constructed.

In 1929 de Havilland Aircraft of Canada constructed an aircraft manufacturing plant, hangar and airfield in the area then known as Downsview. The airfield was adjacent to the railway (then operated by Canadian National Railway) and affected the grid-like alignment of roads. Following World War II, the Department of National Defence (DND) was in need of property for stationing Royal Canadian Air Force (RCAF) squadrons to protect the concentration of industry and population in southern Ontario. In 1947, the federal government acquired and consolidated 270 properties in Downsview surrounding the De Havilland manufacturing plant, including land on both sides of the railway line. This large tract was developed in the ensuing years as RCAF Station Downsview and became part of the Canadian military's front-line defence of the region.

== CFB Toronto ==
The 1 February 1968 unification of the RCAF, Royal Canadian Navy and Canadian Army to form the Canadian Forces saw RCAF Station Downsview renamed Canadian Forces Base Toronto (Downsview), later shortened to Canadian Forces Base Toronto (or CFB Toronto). Operational units continued to use CFB Toronto through the 1970s and 1980s.

The first of several non-military events took place in 1984 with the Papal Visit by Pope John Paul II, during which he held an outdoor mass for hundreds of thousands of worshippers.

Declining use of the base led the Government of Canada to close and decommission CFB Toronto. When this was announced in 1994, the government stipulated "the existing DND-owned lands associated with the Downsview site will be held in perpetuity and in trust primarily as a unique urban recreational greenspace for the enjoyment of future generations." The base closed on 1 April 1996, the 72nd anniversary of the Royal Canadian Air Force, along with its Detachment on Avenue Road. In 1995, the "Downsview Framework Plan" was released and the Canada Lands Company was directed to manage the planning and development process for the property.

CFB Toronto is still represented in the area of Denison Armoury, according to the Canadian Armed Forces official website map used to locate CFRC locations.

== Military housing ==
A series of homes for Canadian Forces personnel were built at the corner of Keele Street and Sheppard Avenue West (William Baker Park) and at the south end of the base property (Stanley Greene Park). Access to the north end housing on Robert Woodhead Crescent and John Drury Drive was restricted to base personnel and fenced off from the neighbouring properties, as was the south end housing on Frederick Tisdale circle.

Off base housing existed on Sunfield road and Sheppard avenue west of Keele St, it was called LDH's (low development housing) and housed military personnel from the 1950s to the 1990s. It consisted of row house units similar to Stanley Greene Park housing. The housing affectionately known as the "local dog houses" by military personnel and their dependents was demolished in the mid-1990s to make way for town homes.

In 2009, the Canadian Forces Housing Authority began the process of disposing of all military housing in Toronto, starting with the demolition of the Stanley Greene Park homes that were damaged by an explosion at the nearby Sunrise Propane storage facility in August 2008 (Reference: Canadian Forces Housing Authority). The remaining homes were demolished in 2012.

The William Baker Park homes were demolished in late 2014.

== Downsview Park ==
In 1998, Canada Lands Company incorporated a subsidiary named Parc Downsview Park (PDP, commonly Downsview Park) to assume responsibility for managing the development of 236 hectares (583 acres) of the former military base. 24 hectares (61 acres) remained with the DND. Public consultations and a design initiative took place through the late 1990s and early 2000s, with the goal of creating a leading-edge sustainable community, setting standards for urban design. In 2004, the PDP's final design plan was announced and approved by a panel of landscape architects, architects and urban planners. However, little development took place and the plans fell into dormancy.

Parts of the property are currently undergoing development, while the airfield is being managed as the Toronto/Downsview Airport and is still in use by the successor to de Havilland Canada, Bombardier Aerospace.

The airfield was used in 2002 for another Papal Visit by Pope John Paul II for the World Youth Day celebrations and in 2003 the "Molson Canadian Rocks for Toronto" concert featuring The Rolling Stones saw 450,000 people visit Downsview Park.

Downsview Park still houses some Canadian Forces regular and reserve force units and was home to the Canadian Air and Space Museum. Numerous buildings have been demolished, especially on the west side of the former base. On the east-side, two of Downsview's old maintenance hangars, known as buildings 55 & 58, were demolished in March 2010. A desperate effort had been mounted by heritage organizations to save the hangars, built in 1942. Despite the fact that they had been designated as heritage buildings, they were ultimately demolished.

== Former units ==
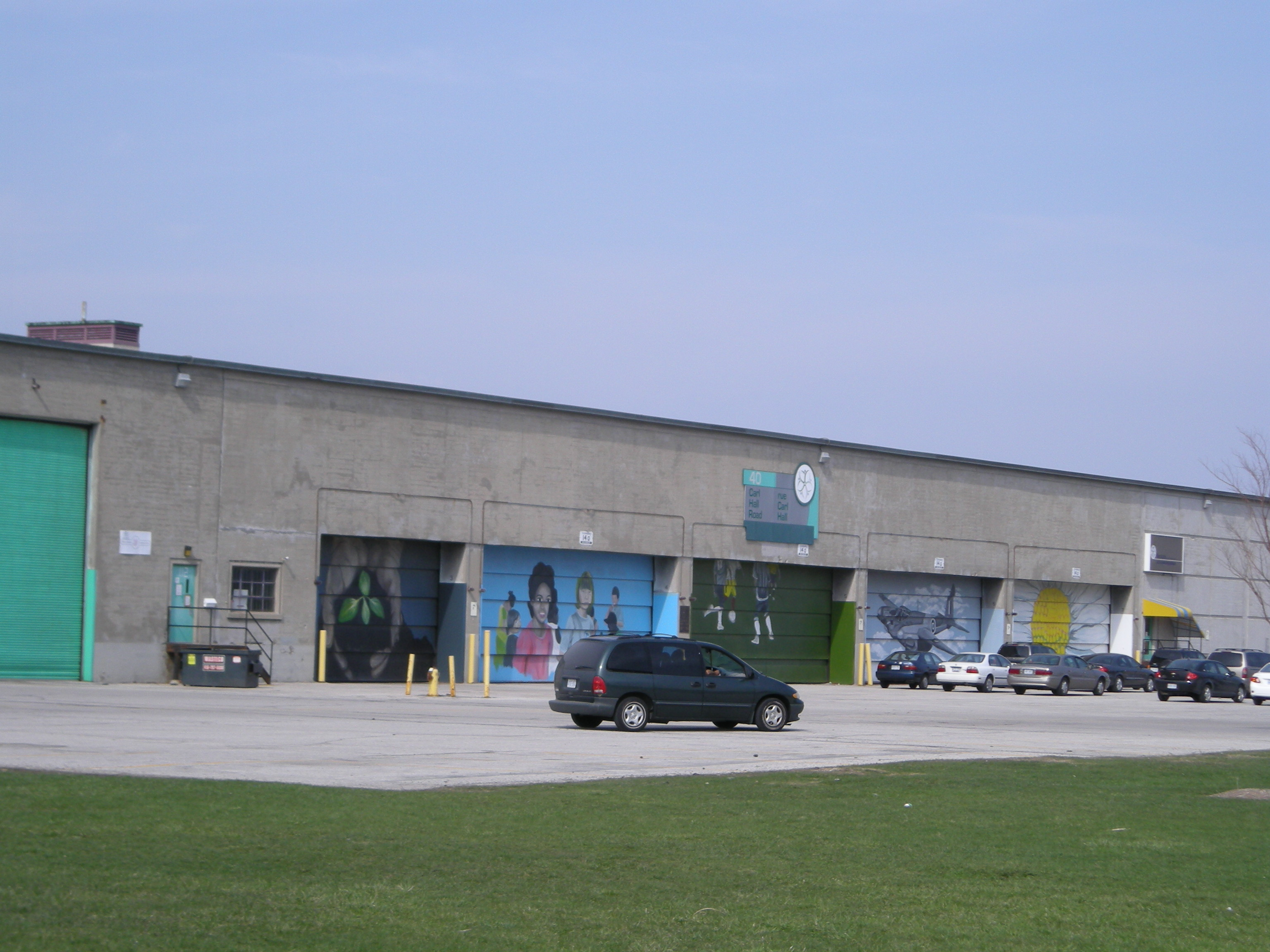
The Supply Depot

- Operational and training units
  - 400 Tactical and Training Helicopter Squadron - moved to CFB Borden
  - 400 Auxiliary Squadron
  - 411 Fighter Squadron - disbanded
  - 411 "County of York" Fighter Squadron
  - 411 Squadron
  - 411 Auxiliary Squadron
  - 411 "County of York" Air Reserve Squadron
  - 411 Tactical Aviation Squadron
  - 411 Tactical Helicopter Squadron
  - 436 Transport Squadron - moved to CFB Trenton
- Non-operational units
  - Air Transport Command - disbanded
  - 14 Wing Headquarters - renamed 2 Tactical Aviation Wing and No. 14 Movement Control Detachment
  - Defence Research Medical Laboratories - renamed the Defence Research Establishment Toronto, later Defence and Civil Institute for Environmental Medicine, and currently Defence R&D Canada - Toronto
  - Canadian Forces Aircrew Selection Centre - formerly Aircrew Selection Unit
  - Army Toronto District Headquarters - later as 32 Canadian Brigade Group Headquarters
  - Central Militia Area Headquarters
  - The 1 Canadian Forces Supply Depot, located on Carl Hall Road

== Current units ==
Despite CFB Toronto having been closed, a small military presence remains on the property with the Department of National Defence having retained several buildings in Parc Downsview Park for these units:

- 4th Canadian Division headquarters
- Denison Armouries - moved from Dufferin Street and Highway 401 location (now a vacant lot beside Costco)
  - Area Support Unit Toronto (formerly Garrison Support Unit Toronto)
  - Joint Task Force Central Area Headquarters
  - 2 Area Support Group Signal Squadron Toronto Detachment
  - 32 Canadian Brigade Group headquarters
  - 2 Intelligence Company
  - 32 Combat Engineer Regiment
  - 32 Military Police Platoon
  - 32 (Toronto) Service Battalion
  - The Governor General's Horse Guards
  - RC(AIR)CS 188 "Cobra" Squadron (Cadets)
  - Various Cadet units

== Aircraft ==
A list of military aircraft stationed at Downsview:

- de Havilland Vampire fighter - with Auxiliary Fighter-Bomber Squadron
- North American CL-13 Sabre fighter - with Auxiliary Fighter-Bomber Squadron
- Beechcraft Model 18 - with 400 "City of Toronto" (Fighter) Squadron (2 Air Wing Reserve)/400 "City of Toronto" Air Reserve Squadron
- de Havilland Canada DHC-3 Otter STOL - with 400 "City of Toronto" (Fighter) Squadron (2 Air Wing Reserve)/400 "City of Toronto" Air Reserve Squadron
- Bell Helicopter CH-136 Kiowa helicopter - with 400 Tactical Helicopter and Training Squadron

== Static display ==
Several pieces of military equipment are located along Sheppard Avenue West outside LFC HQ:

- 2 M4A3E8/M4A3(76)W HVSS Shermans
- floating pontoon bridge
- Cougar AVGP
- MLVW (M35) Truck

Other pieces of military equipment are located next door outside of DRDC Toronto:

- Canadair CF-5A/CF-116A Freedom Fighter
- M113 APC
