= Downsview (disambiguation) =

Downsview is a neighbourhood in Toronto, Canada

Downsview may also refer to:

- Downsview Park station, a Toronto Transit Commission subway station opened in 2017
- Downsview Airport, a testing facility for Bombardier Aerospace
- Downsview Park, a federal park in the Downsview neighbourhood of Toronto, Canada
- Sheppard West station, a Toronto Transit Commission subway station formerly called Downsview station
