= Dalton Armoury =

Canadian Forces Primary Reserve facility in North York, Ontario

Coordinates: 43°44′45″N 79°21′16″W

- Interactive map of the Dalton Armoury area

General information
- Type: Drill Hall / armoury
- Location: North York, Ontario, Canada, 20 Scarsdale Road
- Current tenants: Buffs Company, The Queen's Own Rifles of Canada
- Inaugurated: April 22, 2006
- Owner: Canadian Forces

Dalton Armoury is a Canadian Forces Primary Reserve facility located at 20 Scarsdale Road in North York, Ontario, Canada. It was opened on April 22, 2006.

The building was leased primarily to house Buffs Company, of The Queen's Own Rifles of Canada, as part of the Land Force Reserve Restructure (LFRR) program. An outcome of LFRR was the decision to expand the CF's community footprint into high density areas that are too far from current armouries by public transit.

The building is named after Colonel Charles Dalton DSO KStJ, ED, and Colonel Elliot Dalton DSO ED, decorated members of The Queen's Own Rifles of Canada who fought in World War II.

== Lodger units ==
The armoury is currently home to:

- Buffs Company, The Queen's Own Rifles of Canada
- 166 Bulldog Royal Canadian Air Cadet Squadron

== See also ==
- Moss Park Armoury
- Fort York Armoury
- Denison Armoury
- Oakville Armoury
- Col J.R. Barber Armoury
