= Downsview Airport =

Former airport of Toronto, Ontario, Canada (1929–2024)

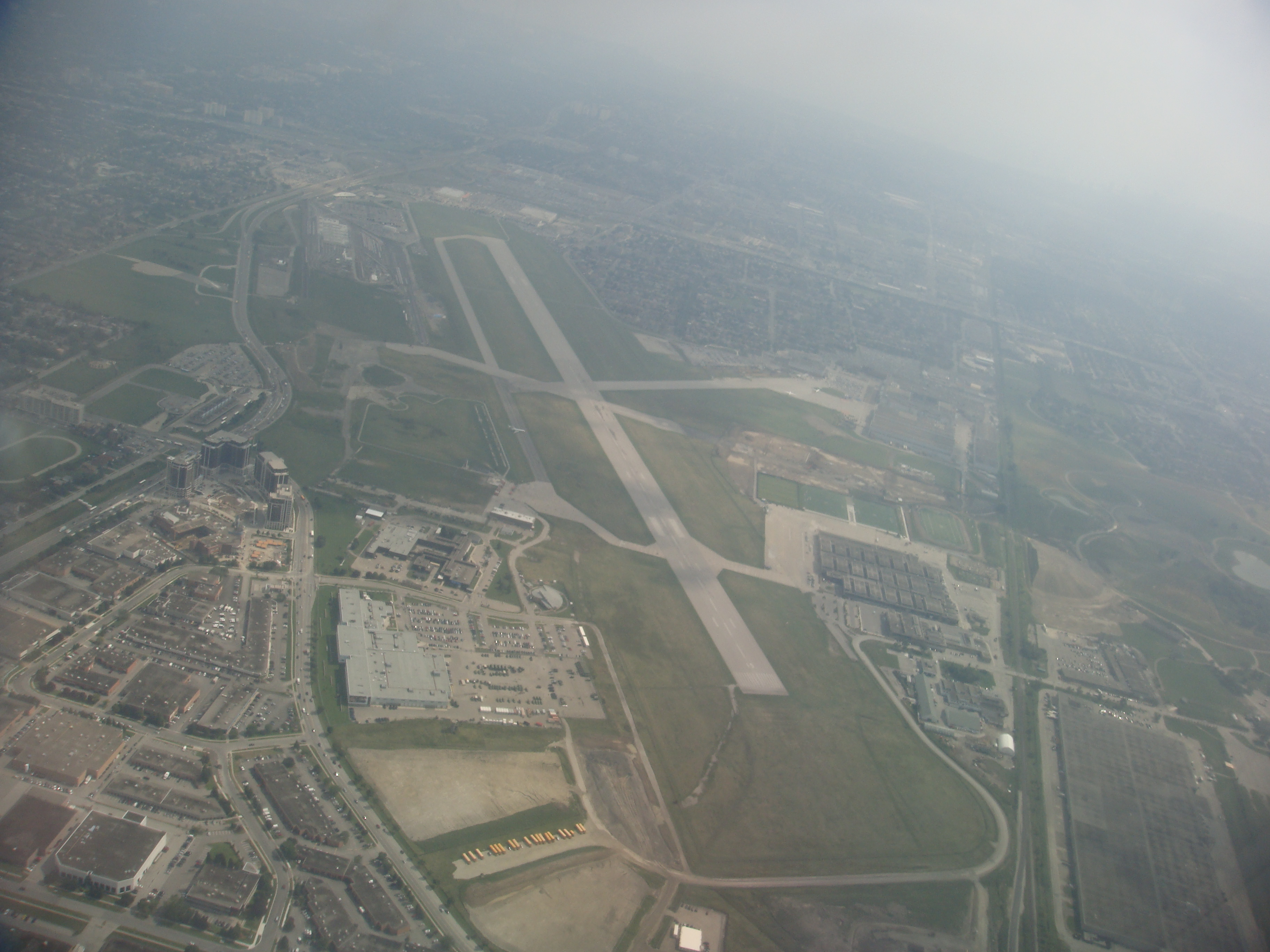
- Aerial view of Downsview Airport in 2011
- IATA: YZD; ICAO: CYZD

Summary
- Airport type: Defunct
- Owner: Bombardier Aerospace
- Operator: Bombardier Ops
- Serves: Greater Toronto Area
- Location: Downsview, Toronto, Ontario, Canada
- Opened: 1929
- Closed: April 2024 (Note: Bombardier flew its last plane from the airport on 23 March 2024 and planned to leave the facility completely by 1 April. NAV Canada issued a NOTAM on 25 March closing the airport, and they issued a notice that the operator intended to cease operations in April.)
- Time zone: EST (UTC−05:00)
  - Summer (DST): EDT (UTC−04:00)
- Elevation AMSL: 652 ft (199 m)
- Coordinates: 43°44′34″N 079°27′56″W

Map
- Location in Toronto CYZD (Ontario) CYZD (Canada)

Runways
Direction	Length		Surface
Direction	ft	m	Surface
15/33	7,000	2,100	Asphalt (closed)
09/27	3,164	964	Asphalt (closed)
04/22	4,000	1,200	Asphalt (closed)
- Source: Canada Flight Supplement

Downsview Airport, formerly IATA: YZD, ICAO: CYZD, is a defunct airport located in Toronto, Ontario, Canada. An air field, then air force base, it had been a testing facility for Bombardier Aerospace from 1994. In 2018, Bombardier sold the facility to Northcrest Developments, a wholly owned subsidiary of the Public Sector Pension Investment Board; in late 2023, Northcrest announced that industrial and airport operations would close by mid-2024, as redevelopment into commercial and residential properties moves forward. The airport was closed in April 2024. In August 2024, when launching the transformation to a mixed residential development, Northcrest Developments unveiled that the 1.5 km^{2} (370 acres) of the former Downsview Airport lands would be named YZD, drawing on the site’s history.

Downsview Airport had its own fire service (Bombardier Aerospace Emergency Services) which covered airport operations (using two airport fire rescue vehicles) and plant operations (using two SUV emergency vehicles). Bombardier Emergency Services employees were cross-trained as firefighters, first responders and airport security.

Until August 2022, Downsview Airport served as the primary manufacturing site for the Bombardier Q400, the principal plane of Air Canada Express and WestJet Encore, respectively the regional operations of Canada's two main airlines, Air Canada and WestJet.

== History ==
=== de Havilland Airfield / Downsview Airfield ===
de Havilland Airfield or Downsview Airfield opened in 1929 by de Havilland Canada, the Canadian division of the British aerospace company, de Havilland as a general aviation airfield and one of two airports in the area apart from Pearson Airport for testing aircraft at the site manufacturing plant. The airfield was expanded as a military installation during World War II by the Royal Canadian Air Force and renamed RCAF Station Downsview, now CFB Toronto.

=== Downsview Airport ===
Downsview Airport was developed in 1939 as an airfield next to an aircraft manufacturing plant operated by de Havilland Canada. In 1947, the Department of National Defence purchased property surrounding the airfield and expanded it, creating RCAF Station Downsview to provide an air base for Royal Canadian Air Force units. The base was renamed Canadian Forces Base Toronto (Downsview) in 1968 and retained this name until its closure in 1996.

From 1998, the property was administered by a civilian Crown corporation, officially known as Parc Downsview Park, which co-managed the airfield with Bombardier Aerospace (the successor to de Havilland Canada).

The airfield was used to host the 1984 and 2002 papal visits by Pope John Paul II, as well as to host the Molson Canadian Rocks for Toronto concert headlined by The Rolling Stones to revive the local economy after the severe acute respiratory syndrome (SARS) outbreak in 2003.

The airfield has also served as a test site for several famous aircraft produced by de Havilland and Avro Canada, including the Beaver, the Twin Otter, and the Dash 8. The airport was available to pilots only with prior permission.

Bombardier Aerospace at one time owned twelve hangars in the southwest corner of the airport, where the Dash 8 was built and assembled. The Bombardier Global Express and the variant Global 5000 were also assembled here at the Downsview plant, as were the wings and wingboxes of the Learjet 45. The Bombardier CSeries jet had landed at the airfield in 2015, but is assembled in Montreal.

The airport had one operational runway, 15/33 at 7,000 ft (2,100 m) with a parallel taxiway. Runway 09/27 at 3,164 ft (964 m) was previously closed (east section removed), as was runway 04/22 at 4,000 ft (1,200 m) (north section removed and south part retained as taxiway into the Bombardier plant).

Bombardier has an agreement to sell the Downsview Airport and its manufacturing plant to Public Sector Pension Investment Board (PSP Investments). Under the agreement, Bombardier can use Downsview for up to five years. Bombardier signed a lease agreement with the Greater Toronto Airports Authority to build a new facility at Pearson Airport on 38 acres (0.15 km^{2}; 15 ha) where it would move the production of its Global series planes. Plans for Dash 8 production were not announced at that time. In November 2018, Bombardier sold the Dash 8 business and the DeHavilland name to Viking Air, which has not disclosed its long-term plans for Dash 8 production beyond the existing already agreed-upon time frame for Downsview.

=== Farewell of De Havilland Canada ===
On 11 June 2022, a private event was held at Downsview Airport, commemorating the farewell of De Havilland Canada after 94 years at the airport. Many past and present employees and their families were invited to attend. The event featured showcases of various de Havilland Canada aircraft, with some arriving and departing from the airport during the occasion

=== Military housing ===
A series of homes were built for Canadian Forces personnel at the corner of Keele Street and Sheppard Avenue West and at the south end of the base property. Access to the north end housing on Robert Woodhead Crescent and John Drury Drive was restricted to base personnel and fenced off from the neighbouring properties. After the military base being closed down, the housing was abandoned and torn down.

== Future development ==
In May 2024, Northcrest Developments took control of the site, following Bombardier's relocation to a new facility. On 17 August 2024, Northcrest unveiled a new identity for the site, naming it YZD, a nod to the former airport code and honouring the site’s legacy of innovation. The $30-billion CAD transformation of the 1.5 km^{2} (370 acres) site will unfold over the next 30 years. The project includes the creation of seven new neighbourhoods, encompassing over 2.6 km^{2} (28,000,000 ft^{2}) of residential space, over 0.65 km^{2} (7,000,000 ft^{2}) of commercial and cultural spaces, and approximately 0.30 km^{2} (74 acres) of parks, green, and open spaces, including the 2.1 km (1.3 mi) reimagined Runway. The Runway will become the anchor of the community as a pedestrianized open space, while the hangars will be retrofitted to house new commercial and cultural ventures. Upon completion, YZD is expected to accommodate over 55,000 residents and create 23,000 jobs.

== Tenants ==
- Parc Downsview Park – Government of Canada
  - Bombardier Aerospace - closed in 2023 but will remain at site for up to three years plus two-year extension if needed.
  - Centennial College Bombardier Centre for Aerospace and Aviation at Downsview Campus
  - Tree City
  - The Hangar Sports Complex
    - Toronto Roller Derby
  - The Toronto Wildlife Centre
  - BMO Training Ground, training facility for Toronto FC, a Major League Soccer team, and home stadium for the Toronto FC Academy
- Canadian Armed Forces
  - 4th Canadian Division headquarters
  - Area Support Unit Toronto (formerly Garrison Support Unit Toronto)
  - Denison Armoury
  - 32 Canadian Brigade Group headquarters
  - 2 Intelligence Company
  - 32 Combat Engineer Regiment
  - 32 Service Battalion
  - The Governor General's Horse Guards
- Wilson Yard, the largest subway yard of the Toronto Transit Commission

Buildings located within or next to the airport:

- Bombardier Aerospace facility – southwest end of the airport
- CFB Downsview hangars – northeast end of the airport
- Farmers market – northwest end
- Downsview Park station – north end, combined subway / commuter train station

Former tenants

- Canadian Air and Space Conservancy, formerly the Canadian Air and Space Museum, and the Toronto Aerospace Museum, and before that the original factory for de Havilland Aircraft of Canada (until 2012), now located at Edenvale Aerodrome

== Roads ==
Most of the roads at Downsview are city-owned roadways:

- John Drury Drive - portions are a private access road for the Canadian Armed Forces named for sapper John Drury of the Canadian Engineers
- Yukon Lane - access route into Denison Armoury.
- Carl Hall Road - former section of Sheppard Avenue and named for Private Carl Hall (enlisted as James Edward Robertson), American born World War I member of the 15th Battalion (Central Ontario Regiment)
- Canuck Avenue - short access route in Downsview Park
- Hanover Road - perimeter road along south end of the Bombardier plant.
- Beffort Road - continuation of Dufferin Street at Wilson Avenue and becomes Hanover Road entering Bombardier plant.
- Robert Woodhead Crescent - private access road for the Canadian Armed Forces
- Garratt Blvd - residents route from Wilson Avenue to Hanover Road
- Plewes Road - residential road

== Accidents and incidents ==
- 14 February 1956, a pre-delivery de Havilland U-1A Otter for the United States Army broke up mid-air and crashed near Downsview (into farm field around Finch Avenue West and Keele Street), killing all five on board.

== See also ==
- List of airports in the Greater Toronto Area
