= 32 Canadian Brigade Group =

Brigade of the Canadian Army

- 32^{e} Groupe-brigade du Canada
- Badge of the brigade group
- Active: 1942–1946; 1 April 1997–present
- Country: Canada
- Branch: Canadian Army
- Type: Headquarters
- Part of: 2nd Canadian Division
- Garrison/HQ: LCol George Taylor Denison III Armoury
- Motto: "Steadfast"
- Website: www.canada.ca/en/army/corporate/4-canadian-division/32-canadian-brigade-group.html

Insignia
NATO Map Symbol
32 CBG
2 Cdn Div

32 Canadian Brigade Group (32 CBG) of the Canadian Army is part of the 2nd Canadian Division. It is centred on the Greater Toronto Area, as well as Niagara Region and Brantford. It is headquartered at LCol George Taylor Denison III Armoury in Toronto, Ontario.

== Brigade Command ==
Colonel Frank Lamie, CD, is the Commander of 32 CBG, and Chief Warrant Officer Margaret Stawarz, CD, is the Brigade Sergeant Major. Brigade Headquarters has a staff of approximately 40 full-time and 20 part-time members, both military (Regular and Reserve) and civilian.

== History ==
=== Second World War ===
32nd (Reserve) Brigade Group was created, within 2 Militia District, on 1 April 1942 when the reserve force in Canada was reorganized for the war. Like today, the formation consisted of part-time soldiers who paraded and trained on evenings and weekends. The brigade group was closed down on 30 January 1946 and the headquarters itself closed on 2 April 1946. During its existence, the brigade group was headquartered in Toronto and held the following organization:

- Canadian Infantry Corps
  - 2nd (Reserve) Battalion, The Royal Regiment of Canada
  - 2nd (Reserve) Battalion, 48th Highlanders of Canada
  - 2nd (Reserve) Battalion, The Irish Regiment of Canada
  - 2nd (Reserve) Battalion, The Toronto Scottish Regiment (MG)
- Canadian Armoured Corps
  - 11th (Reserve) Armoured Regiment (Ontario Regiment)
- Royal Canadian Artillery
  - 32nd (Reserve) Field Regiment, RCA
- Royal Canadian Engineers
  - 2nd (Reserve) Field Company, RCE
- Royal Canadian Army Service Corps
  - Brigade Group Company, 2nd (Reserve) Divisional, RCASC
- Royal Canadian Army Medical Corps
  - No.2 (Reserve) Field Ambulance, RCAMC
- Royal Canadian Corps of Signals
  - E Section, A (Reserve) Corps Signals, RCCS
  - J Section, 2nd (Reserve) Divisional Signals, RCCS
- Royal Canadian Ordnance Corps / Royal Canadian Electrical and Mechanical Engineers
  - No.2 Group, No.1 (Reserve) Divisional Workshop, (RCOC) RCEME
  - No.5 (Reserve) Light Aid Detachment, (RCOC) RCEME
  - No.6 (Reserve) Light Aid Detachment, (RCOC) RCEME
  - No.7 (Reserve) Light Aid Detachment, (RCOC) RCEME
  - No.8 (Reserve) Light Aid Detachment, (RCOC) RCEME

=== 1997 to Present ===
32 CBG organization in 2020

32 Canadian Brigade Group (CBG) was recreated on 1 April 1997, with its headquarters located in Toronto, replacing the Toronto District Headquarters. Resulting from a major restructuring of the army, it was established as one of ten reserve brigade groups organized across Canada.

Although 32 CBG has a short history, this cannot be said of its units. Regiments like The 48th Highlanders of Canada, The Governor General's Horse Guards, The Queen's Own Rifles of Canada, The Queen's York Rangers, The Royal Regiment of Canada, The Lorne Scots, and The Lincoln and Welland Regiment were all founded before Confederation. Most units have served in almost all of the military campaigns involving Canadians: Fenian raids, Red River Expedition, North-West Rebellion, South African War, both World Wars and the Korean War. Since the 1980s, they have been contributing to UN and NATO missions around the world.

Many soldiers of 32 Canadian Brigade Group have served on operations around the world. Nearly 70 members of the brigade deployed to Afghanistan in August 2006 and more than 120 served in Kandahar during the winter of 2008–2009. The brigade has also played a big role in disaster relief at home, helping Canadians during the Manitoba floods and the January 1998 ice storm. It remains prepared to back up the emergency services of the Greater Toronto Area and Central Ontario whenever needed.

== Role ==
The role of 32 CBG is to produce well-trained Reserve soldiers to enhance Canada's combat capability. Like all Reserve brigades and units, it trains part-time soldiers to serve as the basis of national mobilization, to respond to emergencies in Canada and to augment the Regular Force overseas, and to be the army's link to the community.

32 CBG comprises part-time soldiers plus a small cadre from the Regular Force who help plan and execute the training. Soldiers of the Army Reserve — traditionally, the Militia ― train an average of one night a week and one weekend a month. Many Reservists train full-time during the summer, because many of the younger soldiers are students.

== Brigade composition ==
=== Overview ===
32 CBG is an infantry-heavy brigade with 2100 soldiers in 10 units based in Toronto, Aurora, Brantford, Scarborough, St. Catharines, Brampton, Oakville, Georgetown and Mississauga. It has two reconnaissance regiments, two field artillery regiments, a field engineer regiment and six infantry battalions. The brigade recently added two new, temporary armouries. The Queen's Own Rifles now have an infantry company in Scarborough, while the Toronto Scottish have established a company in Mississauga.

=== Units ===
Cities with 32 CBG units

32 Canadian Brigade Group	Branch	Location
32 Canadian Brigade Group Headquarters	Headquarters	Toronto
The Governor General's Horse Guards	Reconnaissance	Toronto
The Queen's York Rangers (1st American Regiment) (RCAC)	Reconnaissance	Toronto and Aurora, Ontario
Ontario Regiment	Reconnaissance	Oshawa
7th Toronto Regiment, RCA	Artillery	Toronto
32 Combat Engineer Regiment	Engineer	Toronto
32 Signal Regiment	Communications	Toronto and Borden
The Queen's Own Rifles of Canada	Infantry	Toronto (Downtown & Scarborough)
The Royal Regiment of Canada	Infantry	Toronto
The Lorne Scots (Peel, Dufferin and Halton Regiment)	Infantry	Brampton, Oakville and Georgetown
48th Highlanders of Canada	Infantry	Toronto
The Toronto Scottish Regiment (Queen Elizabeth the Queen Mother's Own)	Infantry	Toronto and Mississauga
Grey and Simcoe Foresters	Infantry	Barrie and Owen Sound
32 Service Battalion	Combat Service Support	Toronto
2 Intelligence Company	Combat Support	Toronto

== Armouries ==
In the Canadian Forces, an armoury is a place where a reserve unit trains, meets, and parades.

Site	Date(s)	Designated	Location	Description	Image
Brampton Armoury; 2 and 12 Chapel Street	1914–15	1991 Recognized – Register of the Government of Canada Heritage Buildings	Brampton, Ontario	Housing B Company, The Lorne Scots, this centrally located, mid-size, rectangular building has a low-pitched gable roof.	
Denison Armoury; 1 Yukon Lane	2003	Canada's Register of Historic Places	Toronto, Ontario	Large centrally located building with a low-pitched gable roof houses 32 Canadian Brigade Group Headquarters; The Governor General's Horse Guards; 2 Intelligence Company; 32 Combat Engineer Regiment; 32 Service Battalion; 32 Military Police Platoon; 2 Area Support Group Signal Squadron C Troop; ASU Toronto.	
Fort York Armoury; 660 Fleet Street	1933–35	1991 Federal Heritage building; on the Register of the Government of Canada Heritage Buildings	Toronto, Ontario	Designed by architects Marani, Lawson and Morris in an industrial area of Toronto; this large, two-storey, drill hall with a concrete, vaulted roof is home to The Royal Regiment of Canada, Queen's York Rangers (1st American Regiment), 32 Signal Regiment and 32 Canadian Brigade Group Battle School.	
Captain Bellenden Seymour Hutcheson VC Armoury; 70 Birmingham Street	2009		Toronto, Ontario	The Captain Bellenden Seymour Hutcheson VC Armoury is a shared facility with the Toronto Police Service. The Armoury is considered a "Green Building" in accordance with the Leadership in Energy and Environmental Design (LEEDS) Green Building Rating System. This armoury is home to The Toronto Scottish Regiment (Queen Elizabeth The Queen Mother's Own).	
Lieutenant-Colonel Samuel Beckett Armoury; 7535 – 9th Line	12 May 2012		Mississauga, Ontario	The Lieutenant-Colonel Samuel Beckett Armoury is a shared facility with the Mississauga Fire Department (Garry W. Morden Centre), Peel Regional Police Services and the Department of National Defence. The armoury is considered a "Green Building" in accordance with the Leadership in Energy and Environmental Design (LEEDS) Green Building Rating System. This armoury is home to The Toronto Scottish Regiment (Queen Elizabeth The Queen Mother's Own) 75th Mississauga Company.	
Moss Park Armoury; 130 Queen Street East	1965	Canada's Register of Historic Places	Toronto, Ontario	Housing 7th Toronto Regiment, RCA, The Queen's Own Rifles of Canada, 48th Highlanders of Canada, 25 Field Ambulance, this large centrally located building has a low-pitched gable roof.	
Oakville Armoury	1924	Canada's Register of Historic Places	Oakville, Ontario	1924 A centrally located building with a low-pitched gable roof; home of A Company, The Lorne Scots (Peel, Dufferin and Halton Regiment).	
Col J.R. Barber Armoury; 91 Todd Road	1997	Canada's Register of Historic Places	Georgetown, Ontario	Centrally located structure with a low-pitched gable roof houses C Company, The Lorne Scots.	
Dalton Armoury	2006		Toronto, Ontario	Home of Buffs Company, The Queen's Own Rifles of Canada.	
Lake Street Armoury; 81 Lake Street	1905	Canada's Register of Historic Places	St. Catharines, Ontario	Home of A Company, Lincoln and Welland Regiment and 10th Battery, 56th Field Artillery Regiment, RCA	

== See also ==
- List of armouries in Canada
- Military history of Canada
- History of the Canadian Army
- Canadian Forces
