= Toronto Armouries =

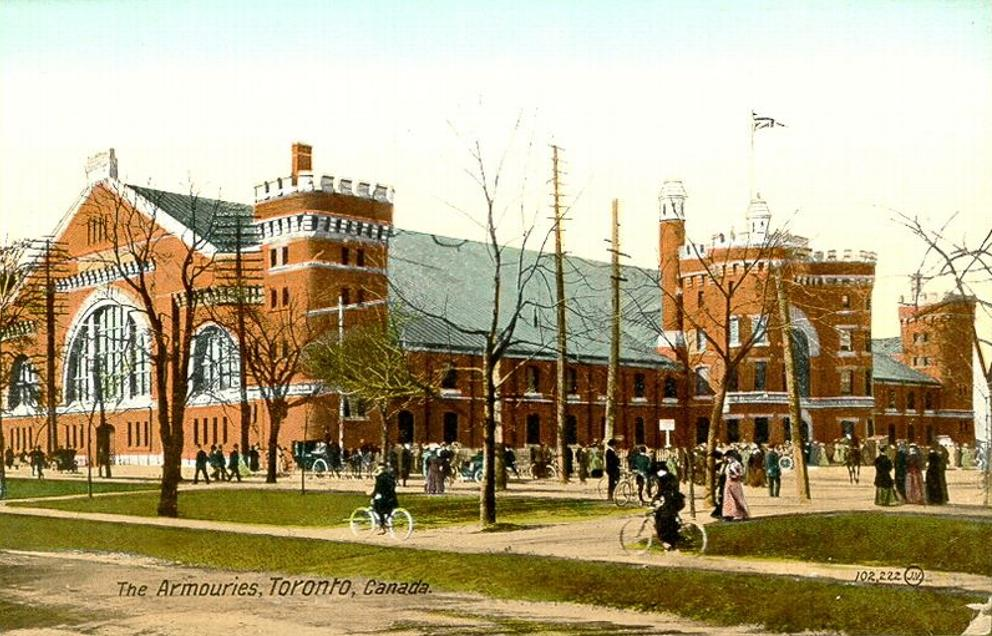
- West and south facades of Toronto Armouries

- Location within Toronto

General information
- Status: Demolished
- Type: Military training facility
- Architectural style: Romanesque Revival
- Location: University Avenue, Toronto, Ontario, Canada
- Coordinates: 43.653°N 79.3866852°W
- Completed: 1894
- Inaugurated: May 17, 1894
- Demolished: 1963

Design and construction
- Architect: Thomas Fuller

The Toronto Armouries, also known as the University Avenue Armories and the Toronto Drill Hall, was an 1894 armoury building in downtown Toronto, Ontario, Canada. It was located on University Avenue, just north of Osgoode Hall. It was the largest armoury in the country and trained over 250,000 soldiers to serve Canada in various wars. It was sold in 1961 to the Metropolitan Toronto government for a new courthouse building and demolished in 1963.

== History ==
In the 1890s, the Government of Canada decided to consolidate all of the facilities in Toronto that were used to train and maintain local volunteers and professional militia regiments.

=== Construction ===
The new armoury building was designed by architect Thomas Fuller, Canada's Chief Dominion Architect. It was to be the largest armoury in Canada. The foundation was made of Kingston limestone and the walls were 6 feet (1.8 m)-thick. It was designed in the Romanesque Revival style with towers and castellations. Inside, there was a drill hall measuring 280 by 125 feet (85 m × 38 m), with a 72 feet (22 m)-high ceiling.

The contract for the project was awarded in October 1891 to Major Saba Stewart of Ottawa for CA$240,000. Construction began soon after. The stones were cut in Belleville, causing the local Stonecutter's Association to complain about the work not being done in Toronto. The final cost of construction of the building was CA$280,000. An additional CA$15,000 was spent on the building in 1894–95.

=== Grand opening ===
The Queen's Own Rifles marched to the new armoury in April 1894 to take possession, followed by the Governor-General's Body Guards. That month, the grand opening was announced. It was to be a three-day-military festival of competitions and displays. The tournament was open to all officers, non-commissioned officers and men of all militias in Canada. Competitions were held in "head and post", tent-pegging, sword versus sword, horse riding and jumping, wrestling on horseback, bayonet versus bayonet, cavalry melee and others. Displays included march pasts and musical rides were to all be part of the festival, for which a 3,000-seat set of bleachers would be constructed in the drill hall. The railways offered discount travel of return tickets for the price of one-way tickets. Admission prices ranged from 25 cents to $1 for seats and loges for $6. The patrons were the Governor-General of Canada Earl of Aberdeen and Lady Aberdeen; and George Kirkpatrick, the Lieutenant-Governor of Ontario; James Patterson, Minister of Militia and Defence; Major-General Ivor Herbert, commander of the militia; Sir Casimir Gzowski; and Warring Kennedy, the Mayor of Toronto and their wives. The official opening took place on May 17, 18 and 19, 1894.

The first exhibition at the hall took place in June 1894, held by the Queen's Own Rifles. A nearly full-scale reproduction of the Midway Plaisance section of the Chicago World's Fair of 1893 was constructed, including the "Streets of Cairo", "The Moorish Palace", "Old Vienna", "Irish Village", "Turkish Theatre", "The Dahomeyan Village", "The Indian Village" and "Chinese Theatre". The scenery was painted by the scenic artists Sosman and Landis of Chicago at a cost of CA$10,000. The exhibition also included the "Congress of Beauties", a fashion show of international women's fashion as well as evening musical performances. The admittance fee was 25 cents, and an extra 5 cents for the villages displays.

=== Operation ===
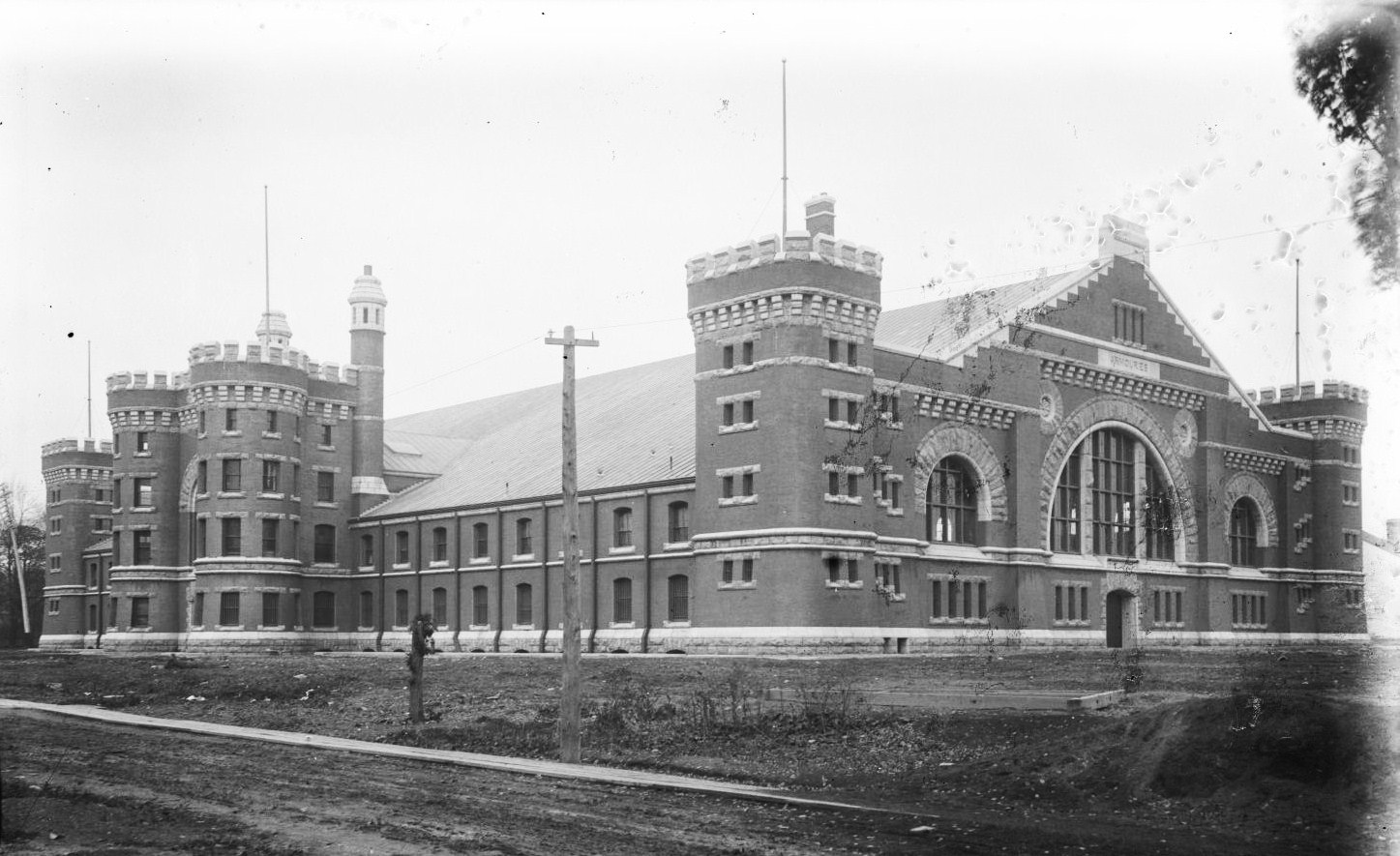
North and west facades

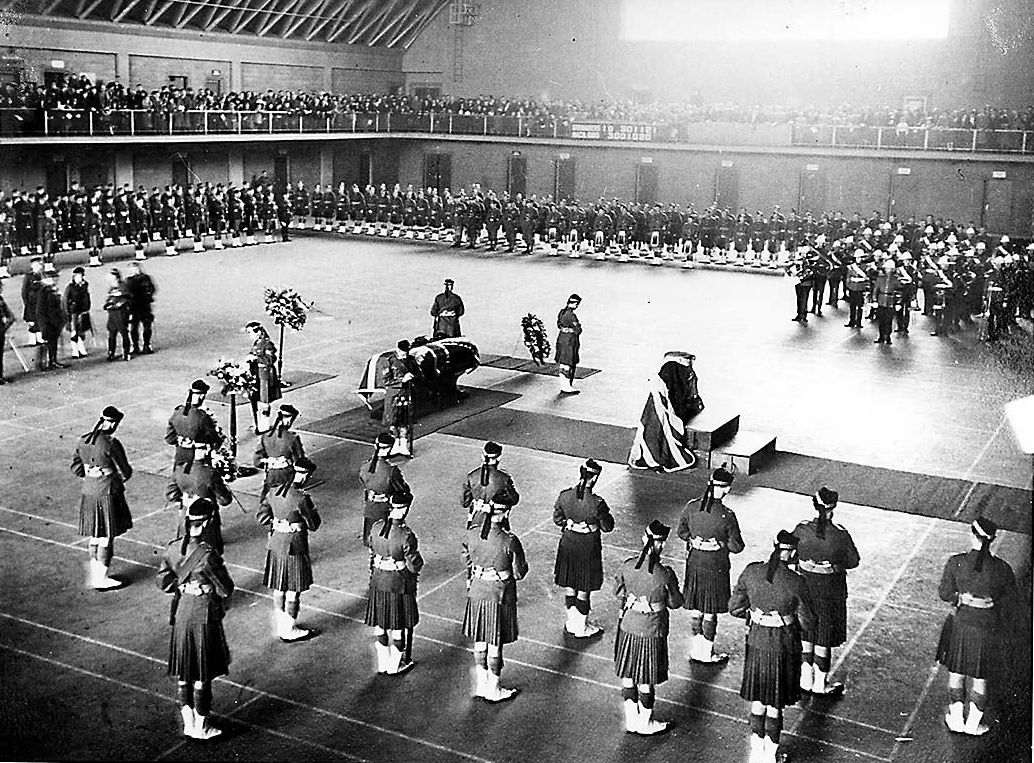
Henry Pellatt funeral at the Toronto Armories.

The Armouries was the site for the training of over 250,000 reservists. The soldiers served in the Boer War, World War I, World War II and the Korean War.

In March 1919, approximately 18,000 people gathered at the Armouries to welcome back the 58th Battalion, CEF, and the 2nd Battalion, CMR, composed of over 1,000 reservists from Toronto after World War I. The veterans had marched from North Toronto Station down Yonge Street then west to the Armouries. They were greeted by John Hendrie, the Lieutenant-Governor of Ontario and Thomas Church, the Mayor of Toronto.

The six regiments at the time of decommissioning:

- 48th Highlanders of Canada
- No. 5 Column, Royal Canadian Army Service Corps (RCASC)
- The Queen's Own Rifles of Canada
- 29th Field Artillery
- 42nd Medium Artillery
- The Governor General's Horse Guards

The Armouries was also used for civilian events, such as professional boxing, car shows and horse shows in the large drill hall.

=== Demolition ===
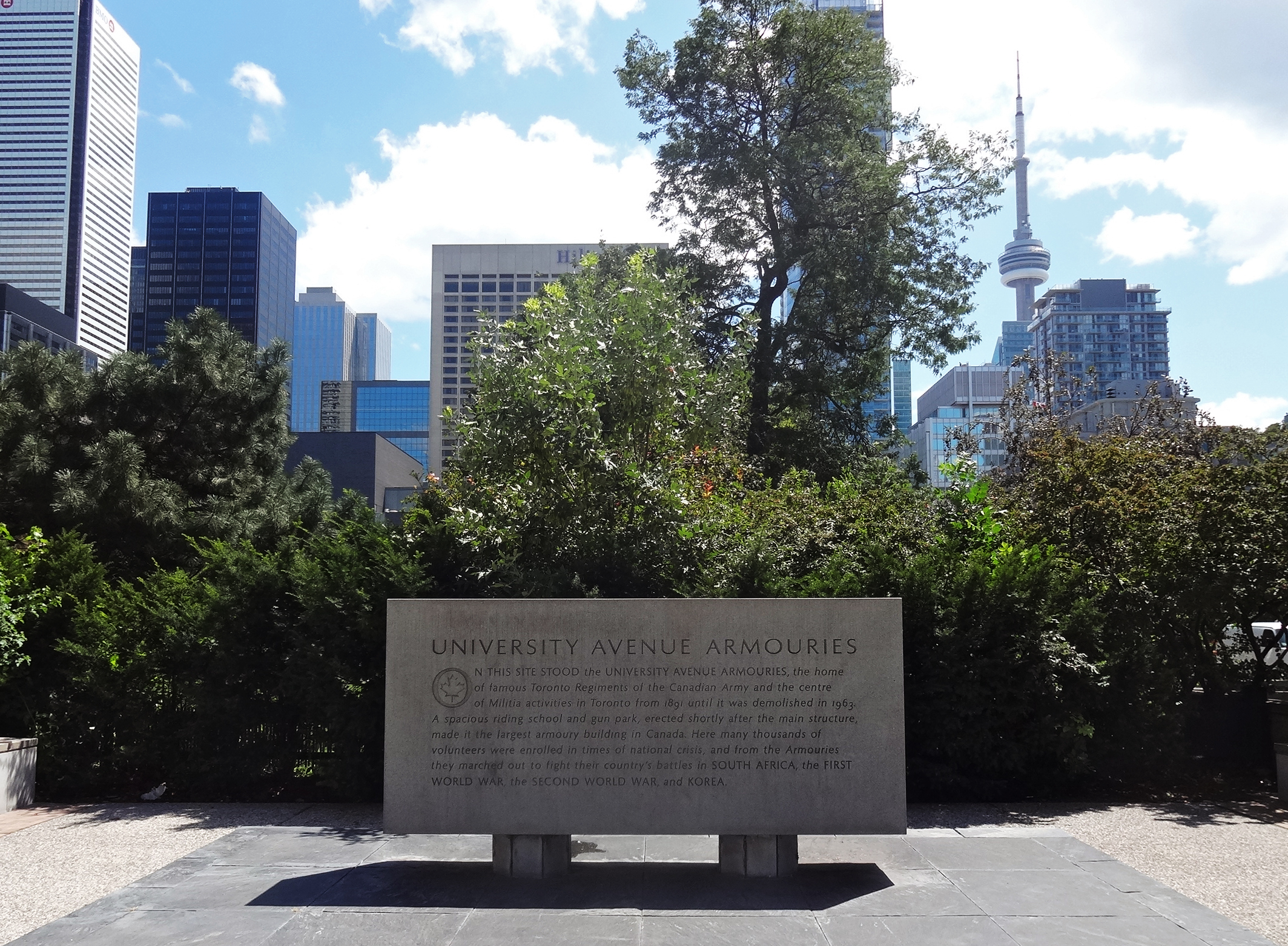
Plaque commemorating the University Avenue Armouries in front of the courthouse at University Avenue and Armoury Street

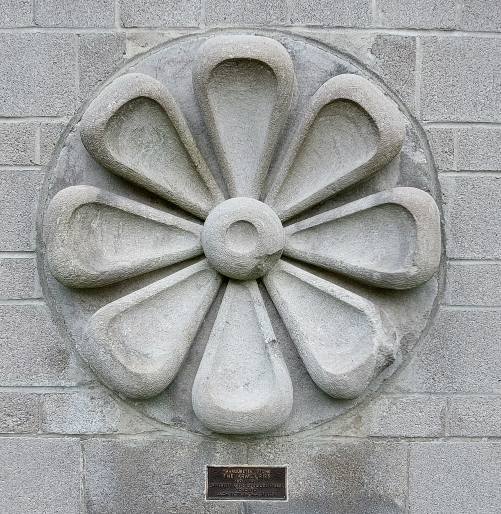
Rosetta salvaged from Toronto Armouries in wall of Guild Park and Gardens Clark Centre

The Metro Toronto government, inaugurated in 1954, made plans for a new Metro Toronto Courthouse (now Toronto Courthouse) in the downtown, to complement the new civic square and City Hall complex that the City of Toronto government was planning. According to Metro Chairman Fred Gardiner, a search of the downtown found that the most suitable location was the Armouries building, being adjacent to Osgoode Hall and City Hall. Metro began negotiations to purchase the property for CA$2 million in 1960 to demolish the Armouries and erect a CA$13 million courthouse building. The purchase was delayed for a year after it was found that the City of Toronto had first right to purchase the facility after the Government of Canada had deemed it surplus.

Opposition sprang up to preserve the Armouries, similar to the opposition to the demolition of New Fort York. The "Preserve The University Avenue Armouries Association" was formed to fight City Hall. It was composed of various Historical Societies. Public opinion was split on the merits of the building. Architects were in favour of keeping it on heritage merit. Architect Charles Dolphin called it a "great sturdy, colourful structure which you can learn to love and appreciate for what it is when you look at all those boxes we are putting up today under the guise of modernism." Toronto Alderman Horace Brown called it an "ugly duckling" and "architectural monstrosity." The six regiments housed in the armoury also opposed the decommissioning. The Association also had the support of the Royal Canadian Legion, Canadian Corps Association, Imperial Order of the Daughters of the Empire, Silver Cross Mothers, the Associated Historical Societies Committee, and many ex-serviceman's associations.

Toronto City Council voted to waive its right on June 19, 1961, at the urging of Gardiner who warned that they "could make a mess of the square if they block the sale." The Association planned to fight the demolition in the courts. In March 1962, The 48th Highlanders, Queen's Own Rifles and the artillery regiments agreed to the Toronto Board of Control proposal to build a new armoury at Queen Street East and Jarvis Street for a new Moss Park Armoury. The fight was lost and the building was demolished in 1963. Outside the new courthouse, a large plaque marks the spot of the armories building. A stone from the building was used as the cornerstone for the Moss Park Armoury and some stone was used at the Guild Inn.

The various militia and regiments dispersed to various locations – the new Moss Park Armoury, the Falaise Barracks, the Richmond St Armoury, the Armoury building at Old Fort York and the new Forces Base at Downsview. The 48th Highlanders moved to temporary quarters at Fort York Armoury and are now at Moss Park Armoury. The Queen's Own Rifles, Canada's oldest regiment, took its stone fireplace and moved to the Richmond Street Armoury (87 Richmond St. East), along with the 29th Field Artillery. They eventually moved to Moss Park Armoury. The Governor General's Horse Guards and the 5th Column RCASC moved to Denison Armoury at Downsview. The 42nd Medium Artillery regiment moved to the Falaise Barracks on Lake Shore Boulevard at Spadina. The Moss Park Armoury opened in 1965. The new Toronto Courthouse opened in 1967.

== Sources ==
- Filey, Mike (1984). A Toronto Almanac. Toronto, Ontario: Mike Filey. ISBN 0-9691501-0-5.
