= Denison Armoury =

Canadian military installation

Coordinates: 43°45′10″N 079°28′08″W

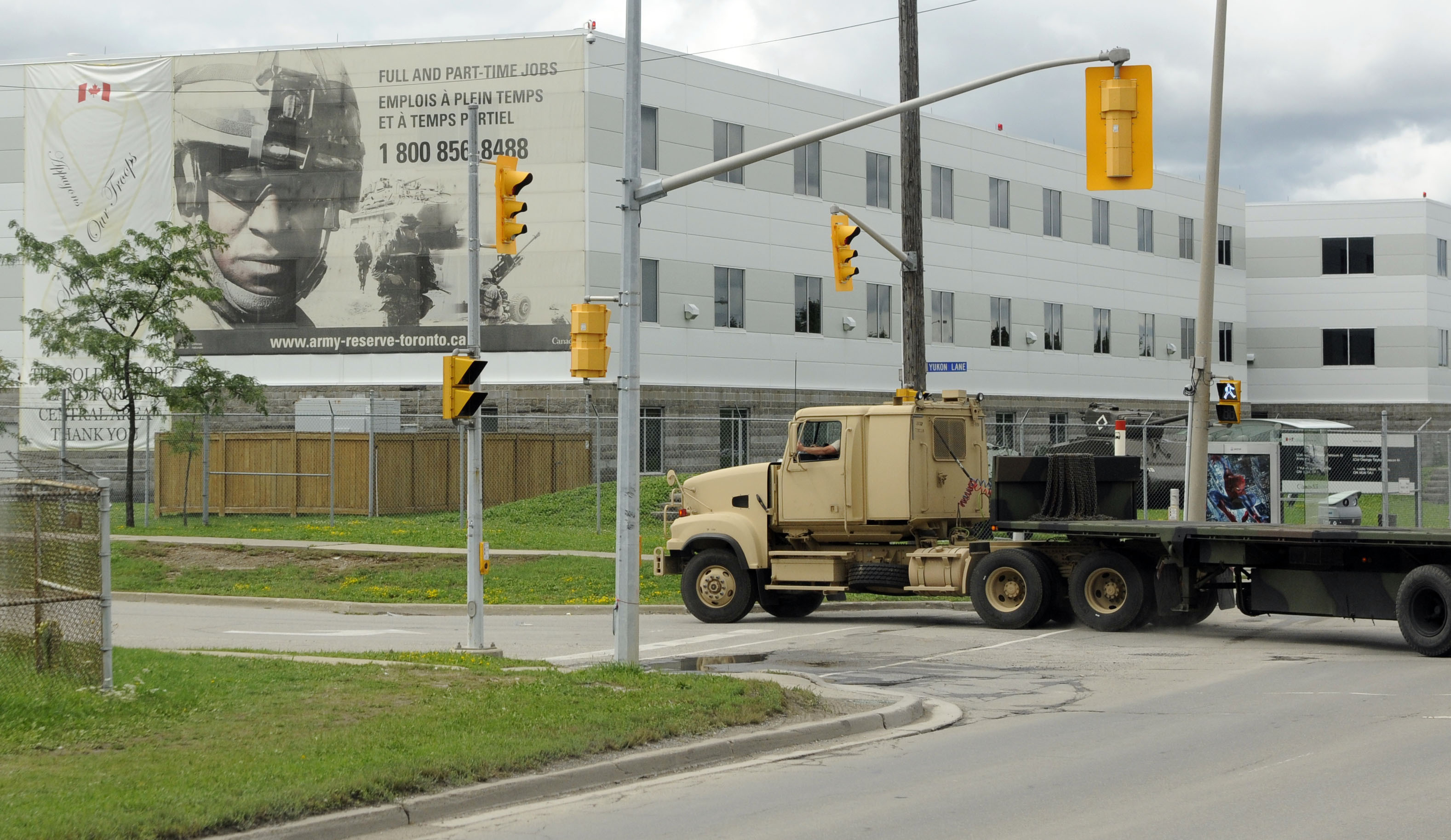

General information
- Type: Drill hall / armoury
- Location: Toronto, Ontario, Canada, 1 Yukon Lane
- Current tenants: Headquarters of Joint Task Force Central and 32 Canadian Brigade Group
- Named for: George Taylor Denison III
- Owner: Canadian Armed Forces

Lieutenant-Colonel George Taylor Denison III Armoury, commonly known as Denison Armoury, is a Canadian Armed Forces facility located at 1 Yukon Lane in Toronto, Ontario, Canada. It is in the northeastern corner of Downsview Airport, just west of the W.R. Allen Expressway (Allen Road) on Sheppard Avenue West.

Denison Armoury is the headquarters of Joint Task Force Central and 32 Canadian Brigade Group. It is also home to several units of the brigade. The armoury is named for George Taylor Denison III, a Canadian Militia commander, judge and Toronto alderman.

== History ==
The current armoury replaced the previous location at Dufferin Street at Highway 401, built in 1961 and demolished in 2003, now site of Costco's Downsview store. After the closure of CFB Toronto, now Toronto/Downsview Airport, the armoury was relocated next to the new site for Land Force Central Area. The closest major intersection is Sheppard Avenue West and Allen Road. Nothing remains of the 1961 armoury, which was built to accept regiments displaced by the demolition of the old Toronto Armouries on University Avenue.

== Armoury ==
In the Canadian Forces, an Armoury is a place where a reserve unit trains, meets, and parades. In addition to the headquarters elements, the armoury also serves as the home to several Primary Reserve units, including the Governor General's Horse Guards, the 32 Combat Engineer Regiment, the Area Support Unit for 32 Canadian Brigade Group, and several cadet corps/squadrons of the Canadian Cadet Program.

Site	Designated	Location	Description
Denison Armoury; 1 Yukon Lane	Canada's Register of Historic Places	Toronto, Ontario	Large centrally located building with low-pitched gable roof houses 32 Canadian Brigade Group Headquarters; The Governor General's Horse Guards; 2 Intelligence Company; 32 Combat Engineer Regiment; 32 Service Battalion; 32 Military Police Platoon; 2 Area Support Group Signal Services Charlie Troop; 2 Area Support Group - Garrison Toronto.

The original armoury was located at 3621 Dufferin Street. Built in 1961 by Page and Steele, the two-story complex was demolished in 2003.

== See also ==
- Moss Park Armoury
- Dalton Armoury
- Oakville Armoury
- Col J.R. Barber Armoury
- List of Armouries in Canada
