= Bombardier Aerospace Emergency Services (Toronto) =

Coordinates: 43°44′17.43″N 079°28′6.95″W

Bombardier Aerospace Emergency Services (Toronto) is responsible for fire and emergency services at Bombardier Aerospace's assembly and testing facility at Downsview Airport.

== Station ==
There is one station that is located at the airport with apparatus stored in a shed near the end of Hanover Road.

== Fleet ==
- 2 Oshkosh Truck Corporation T-1500 airport crash tenders (1250/1250/210F)
- Dodge RAM fire prevention unit
- GMC Safari van fire marshall unit
- 2 Toyota FJ Cruiser mobile response units
- Ford Windstar fire marshall van

== See also ==
- Toronto City Centre Airport Emergency Response Services
