= 32 Signal Regiment (Canada) =

- 32^{e} Régiment des Transmissions
- Regimental badge
- Active: 2011–present
- Country: Canada
- Branch: Primary Reserve
- Role: Military communications
- Size: 2 squadrons
- Part of: 32 Canadian Brigade Group
- Garrison/HQ: Fort York Armoury, Toronto, Canada
- Mottos: Celeres et Vigilantes (Swift and Vigilant)
- March: Begone, Dull Care
- Mascot: White owl
- Website: Official Website

Commanders
- CO: LCol Brian MacLennan, CD
- RSM: CWO Lily Hua, CD
- Abbreviation: 32 Sig Regt

32 Signal Regiment (Amalgamated from former 709 Communication Regiment and 700 Communication Squadron) is a Canadian Army primary reserve unit, part of the Royal Canadian Corps of Signals. It is the dedicated signals unit within 32 Canadian Brigade Group.

The regiment exercised its Freedom of the City in Toronto in 2017.

== History ==
The regiment was established in Toronto in 1907 as the 2nd Signalling Company of the—then newly established—Signalling Corps. It employed semaphore flags, lamps, and heliographs. Telegraphy was still under the purview of the Canadian Engineers at the time, and as a result the 2nd Signalling Company had a detachment that paraded with the 2nd Engineer Company which was also based in Toronto.

After the advent of the First World War, thirty six signallers and officers were sent to Valcartier to join the 1st Canadian Divisional Signal Company. Wartime communications were made up of telephones, runners, telegraphy, and carrier pigeons. Radio use at the time was limited. In 1919, all of the units comprising the Canadian Corps Signal Service were disbanded in Toronto.

== Squadrons and training ==
32 Signal Regiment is broken up into three squadrons. The regiment is divided between a detachment at Toronto's Fort York Armoury and at CFB Borden, with support elements in both locations.

- Headquarters and Support Squadron
- 1 Squadron (Operational)
- 2 Squadron (Training)

The unit parades on Tuesdays between 7:00 p.m. and 10:30 p.m., September to June. Exercises are conducted over one weekend each month. Military and occupational training occurs primarily in the summer, however some courses are done on a weekend basis. Enrollment in the Reserve Forces guarantees Full Time Summer Employment (FTSE) from May to August for the first four years of service.

== Equipment ==
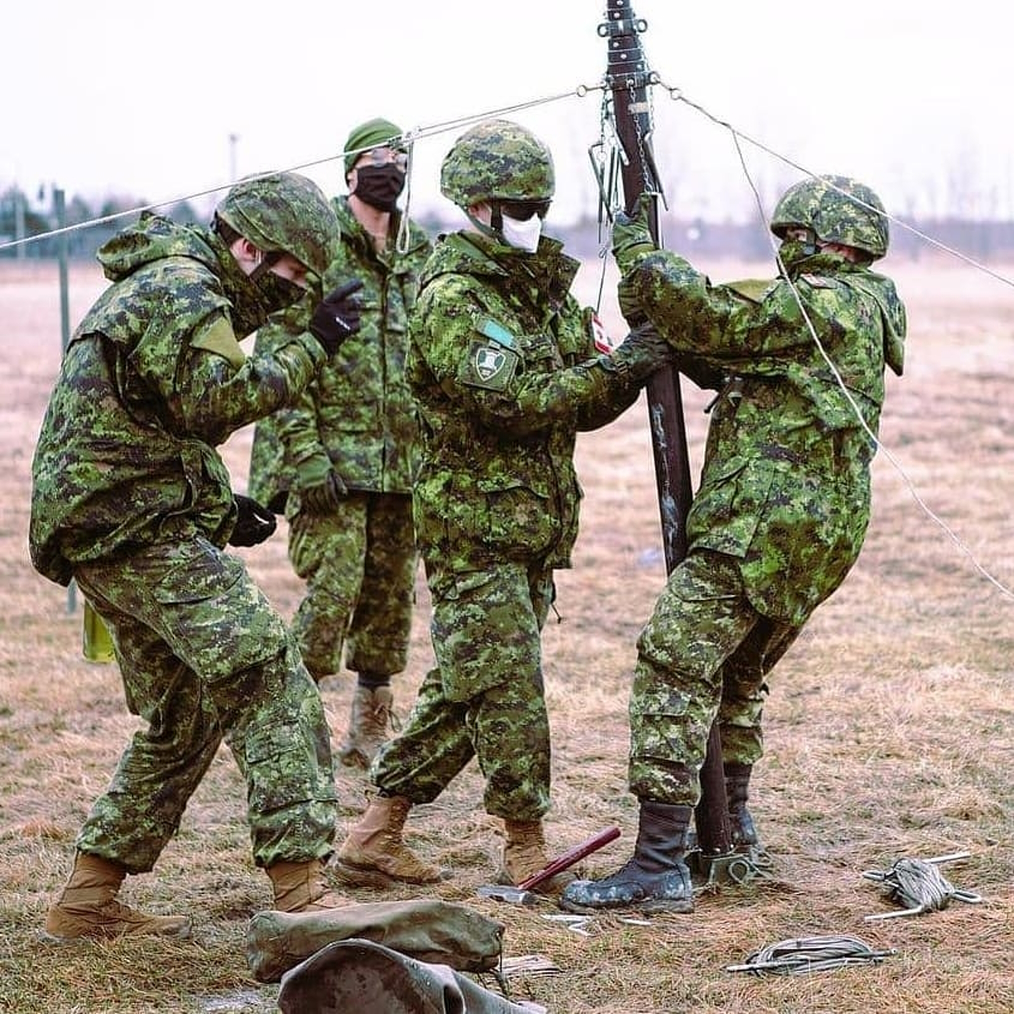
Members of 32 Signal Regiment set up a VIXAM mast outside Denison Armoury on March 27, 2021.

32 Signal Regiment uses a host of weapons, vehicles, and equipment to fulfil its mandate. The regiment uses the C22 pistol, C7A2 service rifle, and C9 light machine gun. The regiment operates numerous vehicles, including the LUVW-MilCOTS (regular and line-laying variants), the LSVW in radio pod configuration, the MSVS flatbed with the shelter SEV pod container system. Civilian vehicles are also used for non-operational tasks, including light duty crew-cab trucks, vans, and SUVs.

The regiment uses various radio systems to provide communications, with over-the-air capability including HF, VHF, UHF, and satellite communications. The regiment is also capable of laying line using line trucks and installing field telephone systems. The regiment uses numerous radio, satellite, and tac-line systems to provide communications:

- Combat Net Radio (Enhanced) [VHF]
- PRC-2080+ [VHF]
- AN/PRC-117 [VHF/UHF]
- AN/PRC-150 [HF]
- Ground Antenna, Transmit, Receive (GATR) [Satellite]
- Broadband Global Area Network (BGAN) [Satellite]
- RA-2000 Field Telephone [Line]

== Order of precedence ==
Preceded by Canadian Military Engineers	Communications and Electronics Branch (32 Signal Regiment)	Succeeded by Royal Canadian Infantry Corps
