= Toronto Courthouse =

Courthouse in Ontario, Canada

Coordinates: 43°39′10″N 79°23′11″W

Toronto Courthose
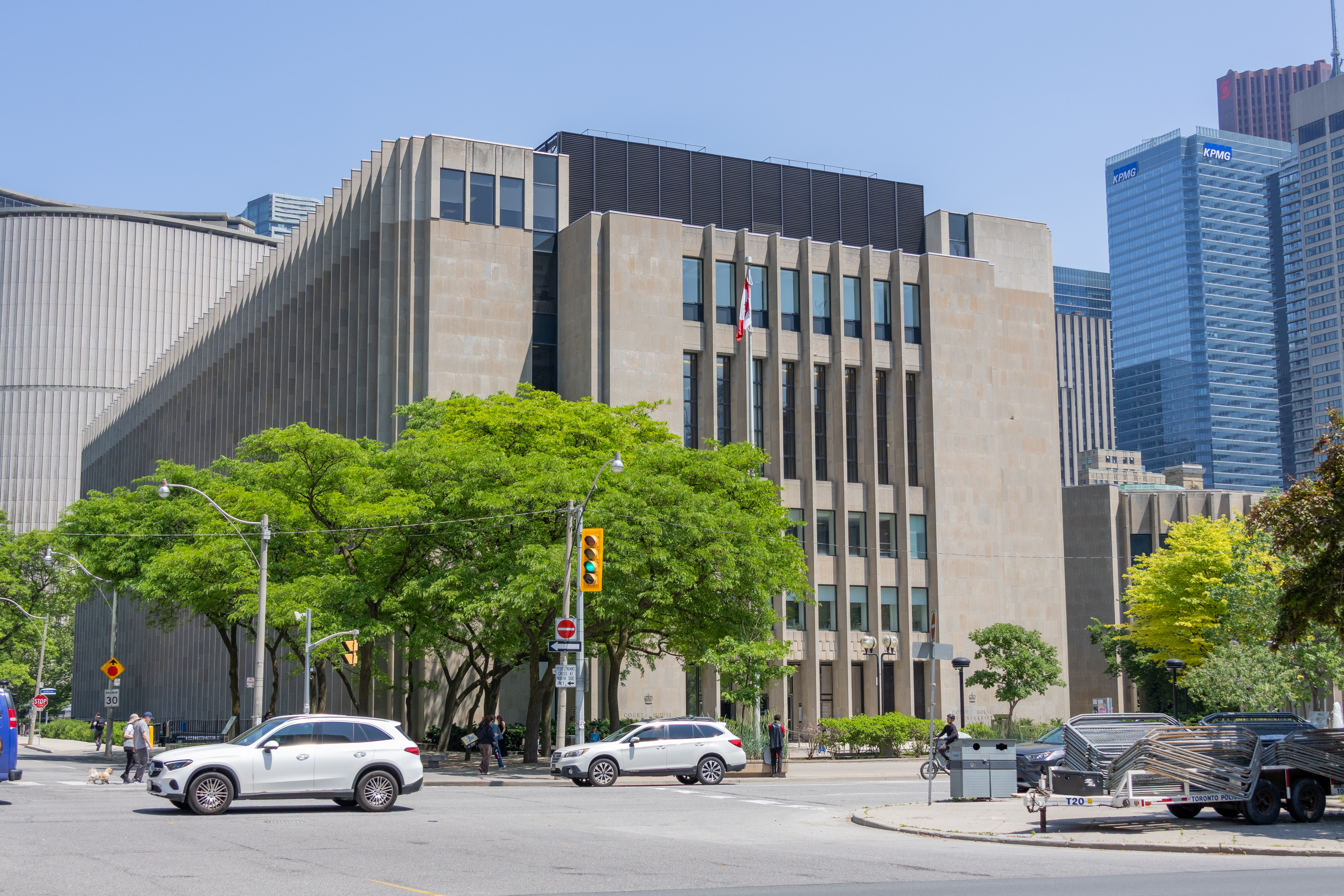
- Toronto Courthouse in 2025
- Interactive map of the Toronto Courthose area

General information
- Location: 361 University Avenue
- Opened: 1967

Design and construction
- Architect: Ronald A. Dick

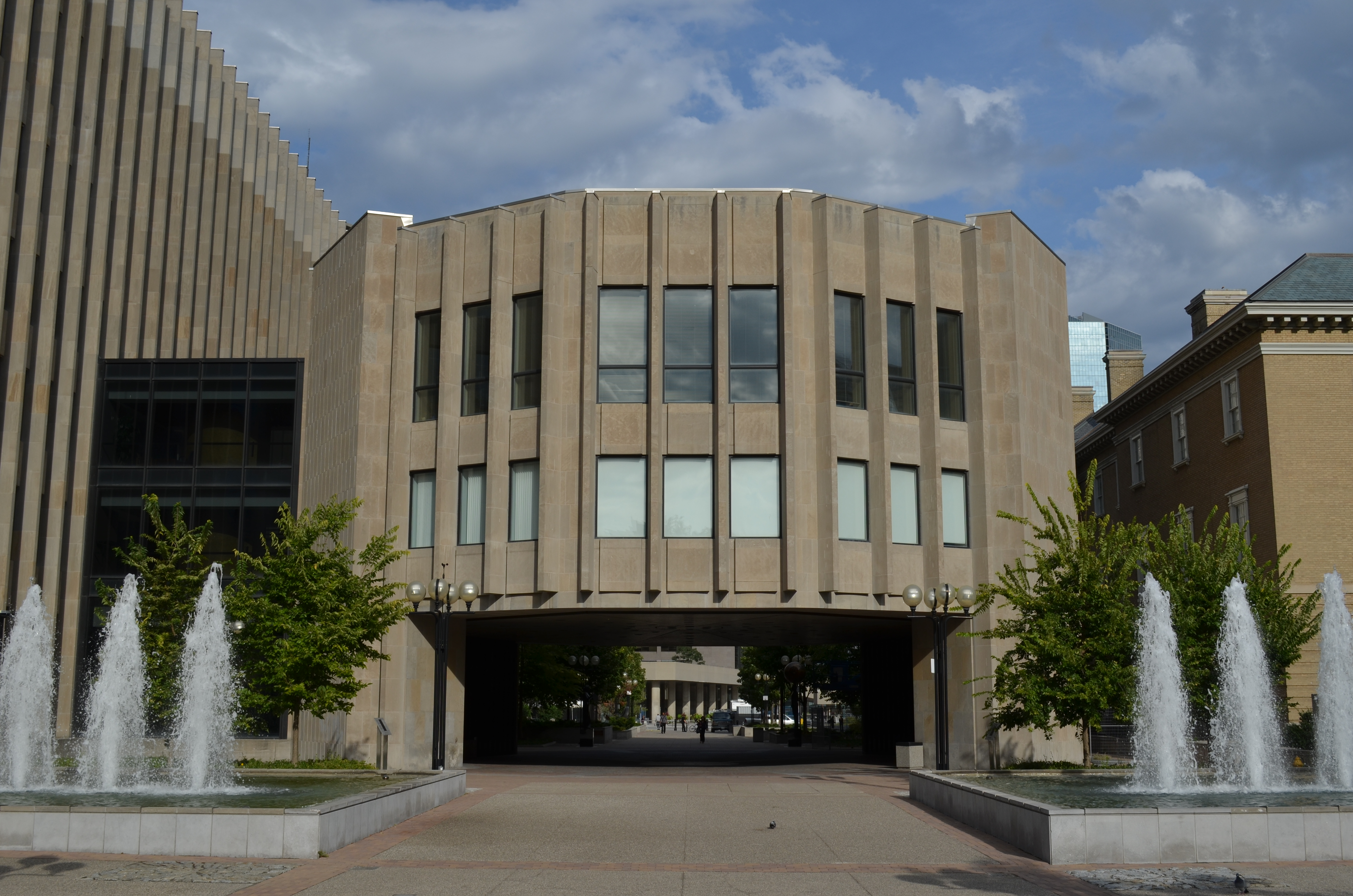
South Wing of Toronto Courthouse

The Toronto Courthouse is a major courthouse in Toronto, Ontario, Canada. It is located north of Osgoode Hall on University Avenue, north of Queen Street West. It is a branch of the Ontario Superior Court of Justice.

The courthouse is mostly used for criminal trials, but also family law matters. Courtrooms on the main floor are used primarily for family law matters, while courtrooms located above the ground floor are primarily used for criminal matters, but, in rare cases, may be used for civil proceedings, especially where a litigant is in custody and must attend in person, or where someone may be subject to imprisonment in light of a finding of contempt, due to the civil court facilities located in other nearby buildings, such as the Canada Life Building, not having facilities to house inmates.

== History ==
The site of the Toronto Courthouse was previously occupied by Thomas Fuller's Romanesque Revival style Toronto Armories, demolished in 1963 to make way for the new courthouse, considered part of the civic square project that includes Toronto City Hall and Nathan Phillips Square. Under the south wing of the building is a pedestrian mall that connects University Avenue to Nathan Phillips Square.

By the 1960s, new court capacity was needed to service Metropolitan Toronto (Metro Toronto). The new courthouse was built in 1967 as the Metropolitan Toronto Courthouse. It also served as a courthouse for York County and later York Region. After 1980, it served solely as a courthouse for the district of Metro Toronto, and since 1998, the amalgamated City of Toronto district.

== Architecture ==
The building was designed by architect Ronald A. Dick, who described its form as one of "dignity and convenience." The imposing structure features fin walls (walls strengthened by equally-spaced piers), a 12-sided form and an open passageway of the adjoining South Wing (completed in 1985).

There is a tunnel connecting the building to nearby Osgoode Hall, although its use is restricted to staff. Two additional stories were added in 1987. It was one of the last large complexes in Ontario created with local Queenston limestone.
