= Fort York Armoury =

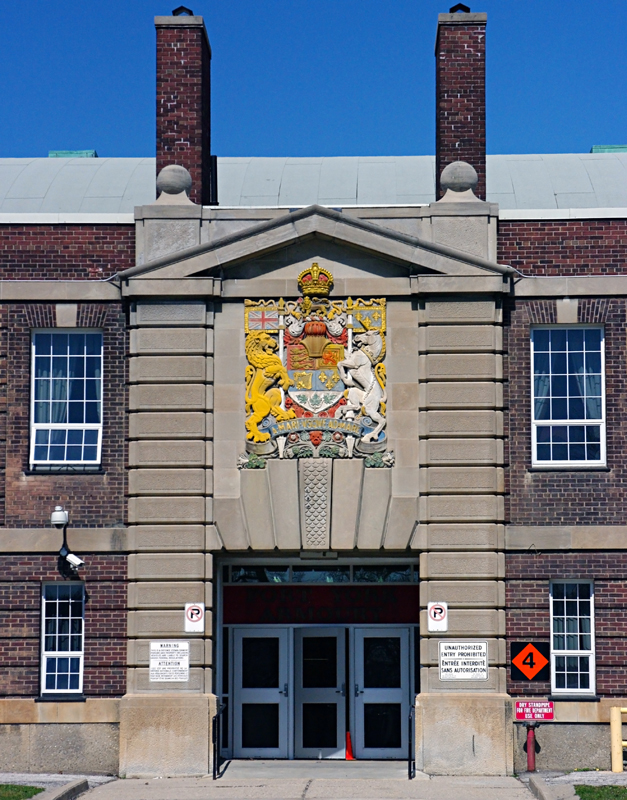
- Fort York Armoury Entrance
- Interactive map of the Fort York Armoury area

General information
- Type: Drill Hall / armoury
- Location: 660 Fleet Street; Toronto, Ontario; M5V 1A9
- Coordinates: 43.6369°N 79.4080°W
- Current tenants: Queen's York Rangers; Royal Regiment of Canada; 32 Signal Regiment
- Owner: Canadian Forces (Government of Canada)

Design and construction
- Awards and prizes: Federal Heritage building (1991)

Fort York Armoury is a Canadian Forces facility located near the grounds of the Canadian National Exhibition in Toronto, Ontario, Canada. It is located at the intersection of Fleet Street and Fort York Boulevard, close to the historic Old Fort York in the neighbourhood of Fort York. It currently hosts several units of the Primary Reserve and the Canadian Cadet Organization.

== History ==
Fort York Armoury drill hall

The armoury was built in 1933 with private funds and boasts the largest lattice wood arched roof in Canada. It was designed by Toronto architects Marani, Lawson and Morris. Fort York Armoury has been designated a recognized Federal Heritage building since 1991.

Toronto Transit Commission service is provided by the 509 Harbourfront and the 511 Bathurst streetcar lines.

== Architecture ==
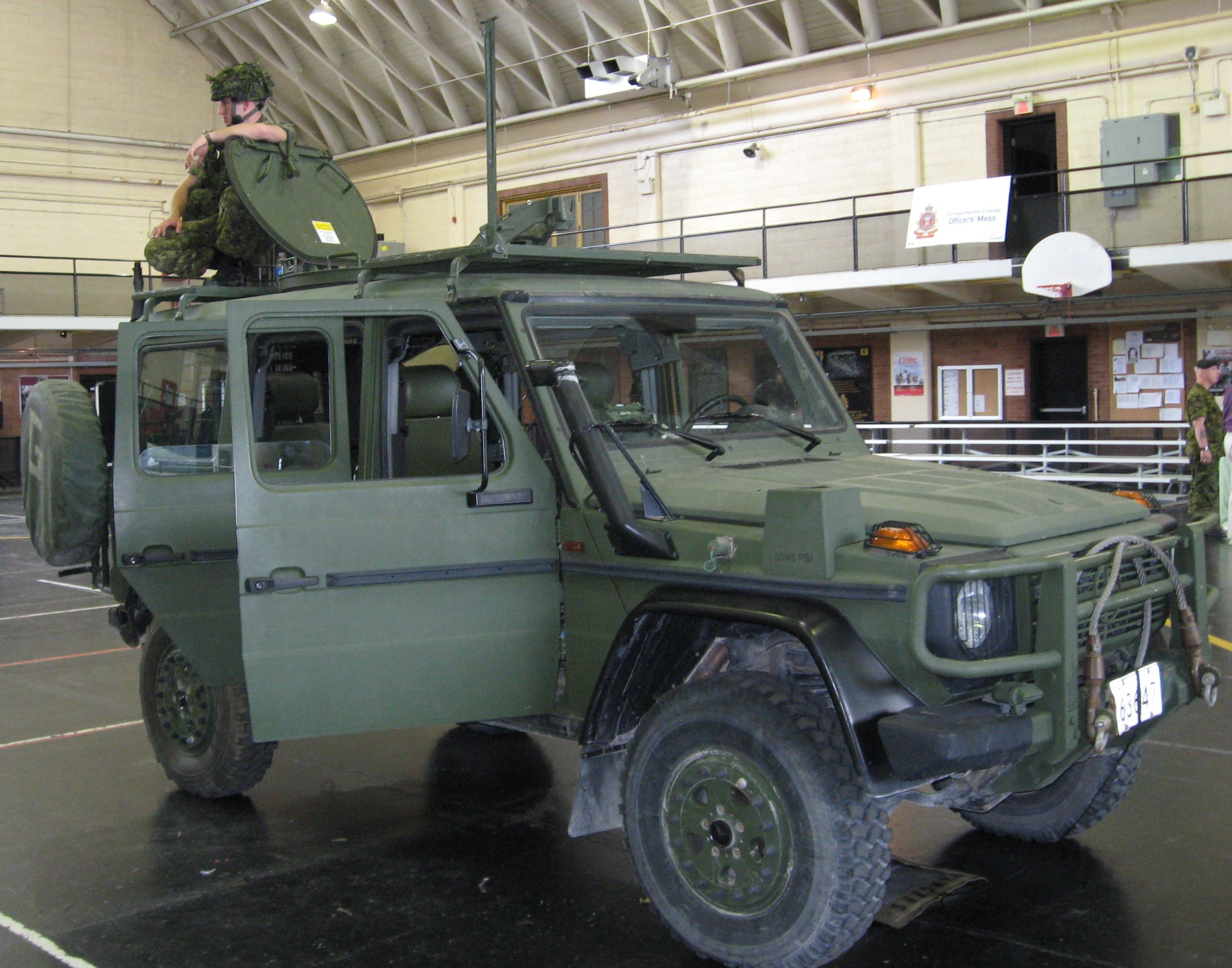
G-Wagen reconnaissance vehicle of the Queen's York Rangers, on display at Fort York Armoury

There are three small regimental museums within the armoury. Overlooking Lake Ontario there are a series of regimental officers' messes. These are excellent examples of the traditional British form. The exceptional architectural feature of Fort York Armoury is a Lamella roof. It provides an uninterrupted span of nearly 125 feet, roofing for parades, military vehicles and the training of soldiers. The main entrance to the armoury has pilasters of rusticated masonry with a large carved coat-of-arms. This is the coat-of-arms of the Dominion of Canada. It appears above the flat keyed arch of the entrance. The cap badges of each original regiment are carved in stone set in the parapet over doorways opening to ornamental iron balconies.

== Lodger units ==
In the Canadian Forces, an armoury is a place where a reserve unit trains, meets, and parades. The Armoury is currently home to:

- Queen's York Rangers
- The Royal Regiment of Canada
- 32 Signal Regiment (formerly 709 (Toronto) Communication Regiment)
- 32 Brigade Battle School

Former units:

- The Toronto Scottish Regiment
- 2 Field Engineer Regiment
- 1st Battalion Irish Regiment
- The 48th Highlanders of Canada

== See also ==
- List of Armouries in Canada
- Denison Armoury
- Moss Park Armoury
- Toronto Armories
