= 2 Military Police Regiment =

- 2^{e} Régiment de la Police militaire (French)
- Canadian Forces Military Police badge
- Active: 2003–present
- Country: Canada
- Branch: Canadian Armed Forces
- Type: Regular Force and Reserve Force (total force unit)
- Role: Police and security services to 4th Canadian Division headquarters and units, both in garrison and in the field
- Size: 270 (Regular and Reserve)
- Part of: Canadian Army Military Police Group
- Garrison/HQ: Denison Armoury, Toronto
- Anniversaries: June 1 (Military Police Branch Birthday)

Commanders
- Current commander: Major Neron-Sorel
- Abbreviation: 2 MP Regt

2 Military Police Regiment (2 MP Regt; French: 2^{e} Régiment de la Police militaire) is a unit of the Canadian Forces. It provides support to the Canadian Army within the Province of Ontario. It does not provide support to Canadian Forces Bases Borden, Trenton and North Bay and Canadian Forces Support Unit (Ottawa). The unit was initially created in the summer of 2006. Since then, the unit was officially established by a ministerial organization order (MOO) and a Canadian Forces organization order (CFOO) dated September 24, 2007. It is a "total force" unit of the Canadian Army Military Police Group (CA MP Gp). The term total force describes a unit which includes both Regular Force and Reserve Force members. 2 MP Regt is responsible for police, security and detention operations as well as police support in field operations. The unit headquarters is at the George Taylor Denison III Armoury, more commonly known as Denison Armoury, in Toronto, Ontario. The strength of 2 MP Regt totals just under 300 personnel. Since the transfer of command authority (TOCA) on 1 April 2011, 2 MP Regt is under the full command of the Canadian Forces Military Police Group (CF MP Gp) through the CA MP Gp, and attached operational command (OPCOM) to the 4th Canadian Division (4 Cdn Div). The unit is commanded by a major as the commanding officer (CO) and the unit has a master warrant officer who is the regimental sergeant major (RSM). The CO of 2 MP Regt reports directly to the commander of the CA MP Gp, as well as the commander of 4 Cdn Div. The CO has a dual function as commanding officer and division provost marshal.

== Unit background ==
=== Recent history ===
Prior to the existence of 2 MP Regt, members of the Army Reserve Military Police of Ontario were part of 2 Military Police Company (2 MP Coy) formed summer 2003 until April 2006. With platoons in London, Toronto and Ottawa, the unit had around 125 all ranks. During this time, Regular Force members of the Military Police were under command of their local Canadian Forces base (CFB) or area support unit (ASU). As noted above, Regular Force and Reserve Force members amalgamated into one unit known as 2 MPU 8 April 2006. The regiment was renamed 2 Military Police Regiment on 1 April 2011 during the reorganization of the Canadian Forces Military Police. In the early 2000s and earlier, regimental police (RP) were assigned police duties within their respective battalion. Although not specially appointed as peace officers, members of the RP were instrumental in dealing with police-related matters. They wore brassards denoting "RP".

=== Sub-unit composition ===
Sub-units are as follows:

- Regimental Headquarters – Toronto, Ontario (Total Force)
  - 2 Military Police Platoon – Petawawa, Ontario (Regular Force)
- 21 MP Coy
  - 31 Military Police Platoon – London, Ontario (Reserve Force)
    - Detachment Kingston, Ontario (Reserve Force)
  - 32 Military Police Platoon – Toronto, Ontario (Reserve Force)
  - 33 Military Police Platoon – Ottawa, Ontario (Reserve Force)
- Garrison Police Detachments
  - Military Police Detachment – Petawawa, Ontario (Regular Force) – also responsible for Northern Ontario (less CFB North Bay)
  - Military Police Detachment – Kingston, Ontario (Regular Force)
  - Military Police Detachment – Meaford, Ontario (Regular Force)
  - Military Police Detachment – Toronto, Ontario (Regular Force)

Until about the mid-2000s, 2 MP Regt had representation at Canadian Forces Base Petawawa within 2nd Regiment Royal Canadian Horse Artillery, the Royal Canadian Dragoons and the Royal Canadian Regiment. The same held true in London at Wolseley Barracks when the 1st Battalion the Royal Canadian Regiment was stationed there. These MP were normally referred to as battalion sheriffs, a term used in a somewhat official manner. In each of these locations, the battalion sheriffs normally had several regimental police (RP) working for them. RP were not peace officers and did not have special powers of arrest. Instead, they were members of their respective unit. They would assist MP in their day-to-day work. Similar to MP, RP would wear an RP brassard to identify themselves accordingly.

2 MP Regt has working relations with MP units at CFB Trenton, CFB North Bay, CFB Borden and Canadian Forces Support Unit (Ottawa). They also partner with municipal, regional, provincial and federal police agencies on a routine basis throughout Ontario.

=== Commanding officers ===
The following officers have commanded 2 MP Regt (most recent to least recent):

- Major M.D. Neron-Sorel – July 2025 to Present
- Major S. Lawson – August 2023 to 2024
- Major G. Therrien – July 2021 to August 2023
- LCdr K.L. Topham – July 2019 to July 2021
- Major D. Lemire – July 2017 to July 2019
- Major T.K. Somerville – 9 August 2013 to 2014
- Major V.M. Hanrahan – 9 August 2011 to 8 August 2013
- Major N.O. Flight – 20 June 2009 to 9 August 2011
- Major K.T. Heck (was acting commanding officer)
- Major V.R. Ethier – (was acting commanding officer)
- Major L.T. Smith – 28 Jun 2006 to 20 Jun 2009
- Major D.N. Boot – April 2006 to 28 Jun 2006
- Major K.P. Carson CD, June 2003 to April 2006 (first commanding officer 2 MP Coy)

=== Regimental sergeant majors ===
The following personnel have served as regimental sergeant major (RSM) of 2 MP Regt (most recent to least recent):

- CPO1 Bryan Grass MMM, CD – January 2023 to June 2023
- CPO2 B.K. Dempsey – February 2022 to January 2023
- CPO1 D.B. Mogridge – July 2021 to February 2022
- CWO M.W. Kennedy – July 2017 to July 2021
- MWO R. Prytuliak – 15 July 2015 to 2015 (acting appointment)
- MWO D. Ridley – 22 August 2014 to 15 July 2015
- MWO A. Andrews – July 2011 to 22 August 2014
- MWO N. Belanger – September 2009 to July 2011
- MWO G. Rideout – July 2006 to September 2009
- MWO A. Andrews – July 2003 to July 2006
- MWO G. Price CD June 2004 to July 2006 (second company sergeant major 2 MP Coy)
- MWO Keith Jun 2003 to July 2004

== Expeditionary operations ==
2 MP Regt is one of four regiments within the CA MP Gp primarily responsible for force generation of military police personnel for expeditionary operations, which included the War on Terror in Afghanistan. When deployed, members of 2 MP Regt were tasked to the Joint Task Force Afghanistan Military Police Company (JTF-Afg MP Coy). Military police (MP) tasks varied greatly over successive rotations. Canadian Forces members who served in Afghanistan were awarded the General Campaign Star (GCS). 2 MP Regt was the main force generator for TF 3-08, which deployed in the fall of 2008. 2 MP Regt was the main force generator for Task Force 1-10, which deployed in 2010.

In the summer of 2014, 2 MP Regt was designated operationally ready for Task Force 1-14 (major international operation for an extended period) and Task Force 2-14 (response to crises elsewhere in the world for shorter periods). Both were unnamed missions and may or may not have deployed. Deployment was dependent on decision by the Government of Canada.

In the spring of 2015, members of the regiment were involved in five separate missions throughout the world, Operation Calumet (Sinai Peninsula), Operation Addenda (Afghanistan), Operation Reassurance (Central and Eastern Europe), Operation Impact (operations against ISIS in Iraq), and Operation Renaissance (disaster relief in Nepal after major earthquakes in April 2015). This concurrent contribution to international operations was unprecedented within the CA MP Gp.

== Humanitarian assistance ==
Members of 2 MP Regt contribute to humanitarian assistance in Canada and abroad through the Immediate Reaction Unit (IRU) and Disaster Assistance Response Team (DART). The IRU responds to domestic situations in Canada such as floods, forest fires and ice storms, whereas DART responds to disastrous situations throughout the world such as Typhoon Haiyan in the Philippines. One member of 2 MP Regt was deployed to Nepal to assist with disaster relief as a result of major earthquakes in April 2015 that killed thousands.

== Clothing and equipment ==
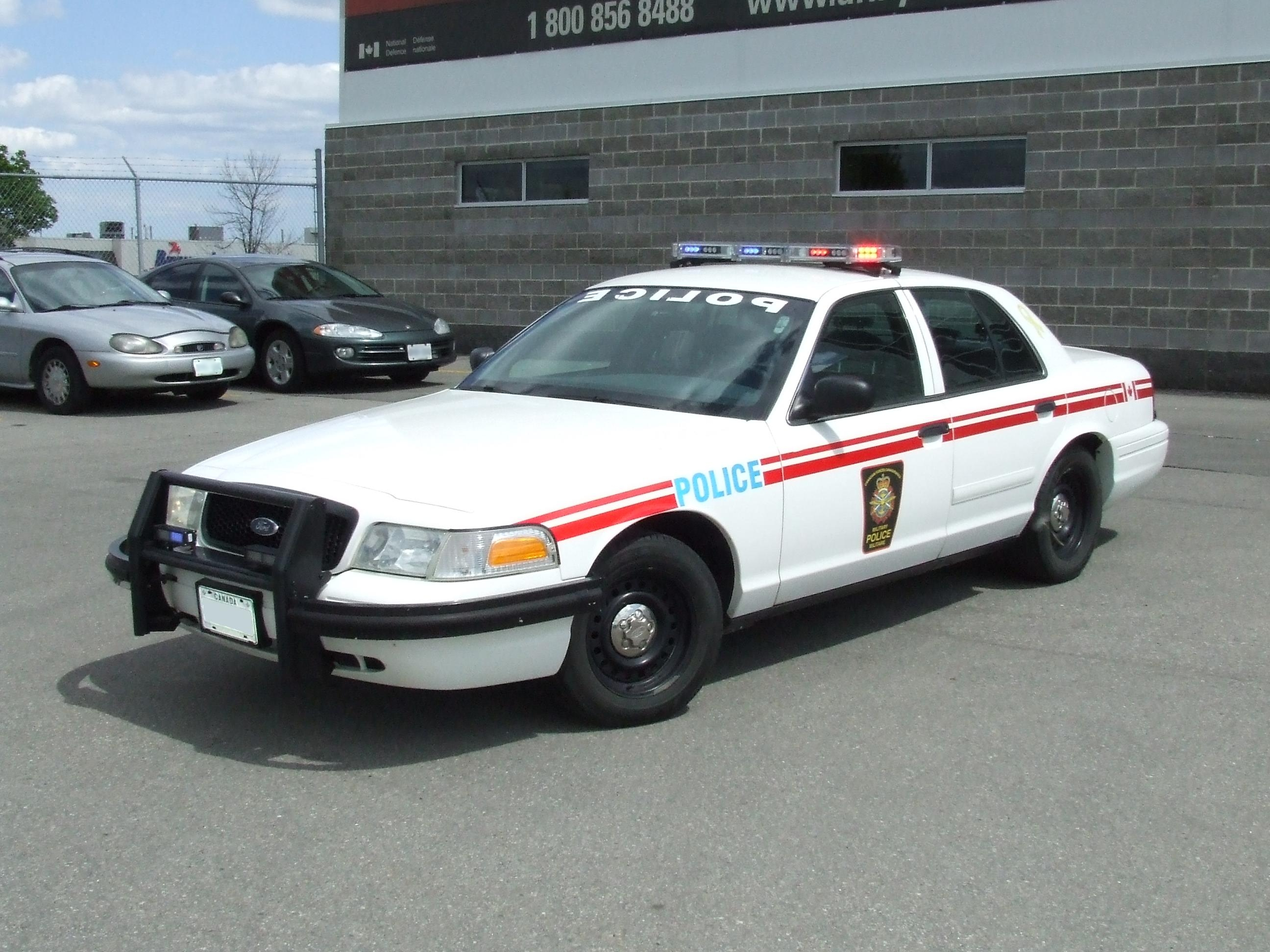
MP Crown Victoria

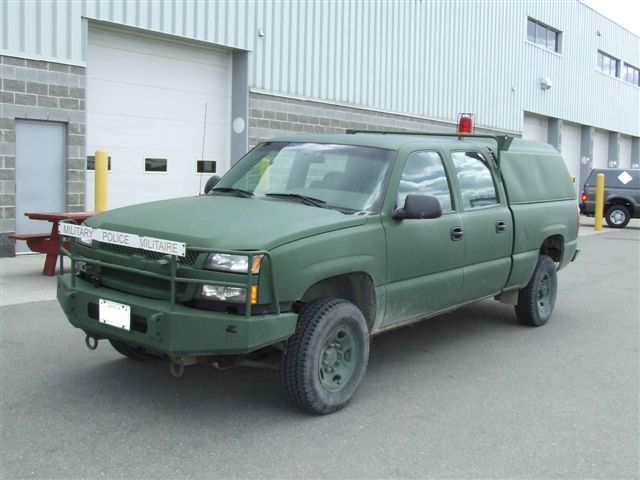
MP MilCOTS

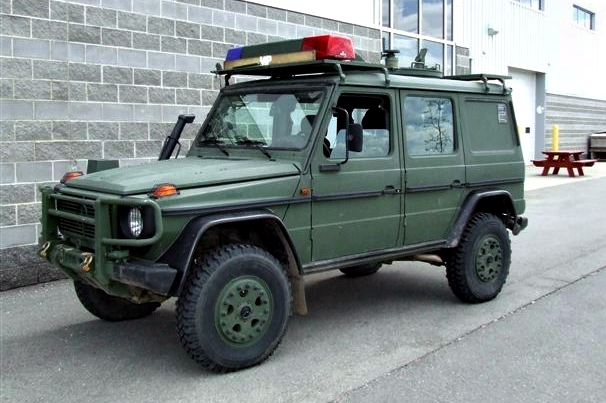
MP G-Wagen

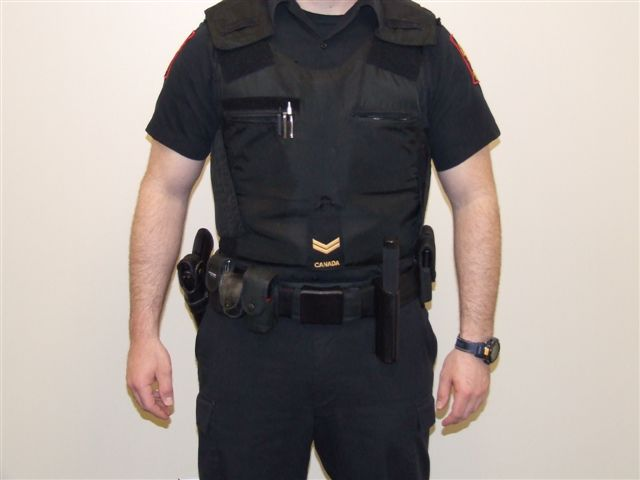
MP Patrol Dress

=== Vehicles ===
2 MP Regt operates the following standard MP vehicles:

Garrison:

- Chevrolet Impala
- Ford Crown Victoria Police Interceptor
- Ford Police Interceptor Sedan
- Police Interceptor Utility Vehicle
- Chevrolet Tahoe

Field:

- Military Commercial Off The Shelf (MilCOTS) (Chevrolet Silverado)
- LUVW (G-Wagen)
- Tactical Armoured Patrol Vehicle (TAPV)

Afghanistan:

- RG-31 Nyala

Previous field vehicles:

- Bombardier Iltis – The Iltis normally pulled a utility trailer with peaked plywood cover, normally referred to as a "dog house" in relation to the design of the cover
- Jeep CJ-7

=== Uniforms ===
Members of 2 MP Regt normally wear one of two uniforms; operational patrol dress (OPD) or Canadian Disruptive Pattern (CADPAT). Members of the unit involved in policing duties wear OPD and all others wear CADPAT. During formal events such as parades, members of the unit will wear their distinctive environmental uniform (DEU). Therefore, even as a member of an army unit, members wear the uniform corresponding to their particular environment; army, navy or air force. In OPD and CADPAT, unit members who are trained as military police wear a scarlet beret. In DEU, the head dress of each element is worn instead of the scarlet beret. Introduced in the late 1980s, the scarlet beret is same colour as berets worn by members of the Royal Military Police.

On international operations in Afghanistan, MP wear Arid CADPAT uniforms with the following protective equipment: combat helmet, ballistic eyewear, tactical vest, fragmentation protective vest with bullet resistant plates and beige combat boots. A bayonet (Bayonet System 2005 by Eickhorn Solingen) mounts to the front of the tactical vest. Optional equipment includes a CamelBak drinking system and the small pack system. The wide brimmed combat hat can be worn within the camp.

=== Personal weapons ===
Members of 2 MP Regt mainly use the following personal long and short barrel weapons:

- SIG Sauer P225 (Regular Force members in Canada and carried by all MP members while conducting international operations)
- Browning Hi-Power 9mm pistol (Reserve Force members only)
- C7A1 or C7A2 or C8 Rifle
- Remington Model 870 police shotgun

Those involved in garrison policing duties also carry the following for use in the Use of Force continuum:

- handcuffs
- OC spray
- ASP baton

In field platoons, as well as on combat operations, MP use the same weapons as any other member of the Canadian Forces. This includes all the weapons above, as well as, but is not limited to:

- C9A2 Light Machine Gun (LMG)
- C6 General Purpose Machine Gun (GPMG)
- C13 Grenade
- M203A1 Grenade Launcher
- M72 Light Anti-Tank Weapon (LAW)
- C16 Grenade Machine Gun (GMG) used as the TAPV Primary weapon

For those MP involved in domestic garrison policing, the use of force model governs how much force is used and when. During combat operations, use of force is based on the rules of engagement (ROE) that apply to all other members of the Canadian Forces. ROE complies with the Geneva Conventions.

== Recruiting and training ==
=== Recruiting ===
There are two streams for recruiting. The local Canadian Forces Recruiting Centre (CFRC) will process applicants for the Regular Force (full-time). They will also provide referrals to the local Reserve Force Platoons (part-time), in London, Toronto and Ottawa. Interested persons can join as MP (non-commissioned member) or an MPO (commissioned officer).

=== Training ===
Regular Force and Reserve Force members of 2 MP Regt receive initial military police training at the Canadian Forces Military Police Academy at Canadian Forces Base (CFB) Borden, Ontario. Non-commissioned members (NCM's) attend the Qualification Level 3 (QL 3) Military Police course, and officers attend the Military Police Officers Course (MPOC). There are separate Regular Force and Reserve Force courses. Members attending the Reserve Force courses are not awarded credentials (MP badge) upon course completion. It is possible in some instances for Reserve Force members to take training at the Regular Force level.

== Combat casualties ==
On April 22, 2006, Corporal Matthew Dinning of 2 MP Platoon and Corporal Randy Payne of the Military Police Detachment, Wainwright, Alberta, were killed in action, along with three other members of the CAF, when their G-Wagen struck an improvised explosive device (IED) north of Kandahar, Afghanistan. The Silvia Pecota print "Fallen Comrades (Task Force Afghanistan)" has the date 22-04-06 inscribed on the helmet band. In September 2006, Corporals Dinning and Payne were added to the Honour Roll at the Canadian Police and Peace Officers' Memorial at Parliament Hill in Ottawa, Ontario. Dinning's name and date of death are inscribed on panel 25. In 2014, a bridge on Highway 21 spanning Clark Creek in Huron County, Ontario, was dedicated to Corporal Dinning and is marked with signs at each end of a bridge. In 2015, Corporal Dinning's name was inscribed on the Ontario Police Memorial in Toronto, Ontario. Corporal Payne's name was inscribed on the Alberta Police Memorial in Edmonton, Alberta. Both MPs had Ontario bridges dedicated in their names.

On the Highway of Heroes from CFB Trenton to the Coroner's Office in Toronto, Ontario, 2 MP Regt provides escort duties to the motorcade of dead CAF personnel, ordinarily occupying the second vehicle in the order of march. The Ontario Provincial Police (OPP) is the lead vehicle, with Trenton MP being the second last vehicle, with the OPP being the last vehicle.

== Notable Toronto-area events ==
Members of 2 MP Regt have been involved in the following high-profile events in Toronto and surrounding areas:

- 2015 Pan American Games and 2015 Parapan American Games security planning
- Operation Sabot
- Security for the G8/G20 summits in June 2010
- Security of military property during the Toronto propane explosion in August 2008
- Security of military property during the Molson Canadian Rocks for Toronto (SARSfest) on July 30, 2003

== Community involvement ==
Members of 2 MP Regt raise funds for the Military Police Fund for Blind Children, a registered charity in Canada. Annually in December, members from London and Toronto visit the W. Ross MacDonald School in Brantford (school for students who are visually impaired, blind and deafblind), delivering presents to children. 2 MP Regt participates annually in the Canadian Police and Peace Officer Memorial on the last Sunday of September. As 2 MP Regt is dispersed throughout Ontario, Remembrance Day services are attended in the local area. Members have attended services in Wingham, Gananoque and Haliburton Ontario.

== Honorary lieutenant-colonel and senate ==
The following have served as the honorary lieutenant-colonel of 2 MP Regt:

- Major-General (retired) N.M. Hall; current appointment
- Captain (retired) R. E. Hilton, past appointment

Members of the Senate are mostly retired police and/or military members. The Senate meets on a regular basis, normally in the Toronto area. Members are advocates of members of the regiment. Senate members are eager to attend 2 MP Regt training and other events throughout the year, where they have opportunity to speak to regimental members one on one.

== Armoury ==
Site	Date(s)	Designated	Location	Description	Image
Denison Armoury 1 Yukon Lane		Canada's Register of Historic Places	Toronto, Ontario	large centrally located building with a low-pitched gable roof houses 32 Canadian Brigade Group Headquarters; The Governor General's Horse Guards; 2 Intelligence Company; 32 Combat Engineer Regiment; 32 Service Battalion; 32 Military Police Platoon; 2 Area Support Group Signal Squadron Charlie Troop; ASU Toronto	

== See also ==
- List of armouries in Canada
- Military history of Canada
- History of the Canadian Army
- Canadian Armed Forces
- Canadian Forces Military Police
- 3 Military Police Regiment
