= Downsview Park =

Urban park in Ontario, Canada

- (French: Parc Downsview)
- Illustration of Toronto's Downsview Park future redevelopment plan

- Location within Toronto
- Location: 70 Canuck Avenue; Toronto, Ontario, Canada
- Coordinates: 43.7437°N 79.4800°W
- Area: 2.4 km^{2} (0.93 sq mi)
- Established: 1998; 28 years ago
- Governing body: Canada Lands Company
- Website: www.downsviewpark.ca

Downsview Park is a large urban park located in the Downsview neighbourhood of Toronto, Ontario, Canada. The park was first home to de Havilland Canada, an aircraft manufacturer, and later was a Canadian Forces base. The park still contains Downsview Airport.

In 1999, the Government of Canada declared it as "Canada's first urban national park". Managed by the Canada Lands Company, a federal crown corporation, the official bilingual naming reflects that its national park status is subject to the Official Languages Act.

== History ==
Before the establishment of the aircraft plant and airfield the site was farmland that emerged after John Perkins Bull settled nearby in 1842.

=== Aircraft manufacturing and base ===
The area was first used in 1929 by de Havilland Canada, where it housed the company's Canadian operations. The manufacturing plant was used to make aircraft during World War II. After the war, the Department of National Defence (Canada) needed space to station Royal Canadian Air Force squadrons in the area. In 1947, the federal government acquired and consolidated 270 properties in Downsview surrounding the manufacturing plant.

=== Destination Technodome ===
In April 1997, North York mayor Mel Lastman proposed developing the area into a large entertainment complex. Plans included three hockey arenas, a movie studio, year-round skiing, a whitewater rafting venue, an Olympic-size swimming pool, and a multiplex cinema. Often compared to Canada's Wonderland, it was planned to contribute to Toronto's bid for the 2008 Summer Olympics.

The developer selected the Reichmann family's Heathmount Arts and Entertainment, and its plan was approved by the North York council in December 1998. Discussions broke down with the federal government, and their unwillingness to sell the land. In April 1999 the Reichmanns announced they would move the plan to Montreal. In June 2000, the developer announced they would also walk away from their plans in Montreal.

=== Urban park ===
In 1999, the federal government announced, to great fanfare, that the park would become "Canada's first urban national park." Downsview Park announced an International Design Competition. In 2000, Bruce Mau and Rem Koolhaas submitted the winning design scheme, known as "Tree City." In the years that followed, little development took place, and the plans fell into dormancy.

Instead of creating a park made up of almost entirely green space as called for in the "Tree City" plan, Parc Downsview Park Inc., the crown corporation then in control of the park, approved constructing commercial and residential developments across the north, east and southwest ends of the park.

=== Recent development ===
The initial phase of the construction of Downsview Park began in 2005. The first step was to regenerate the soil, which had been compacted by more than 50 years of military base use, so that it would again support the lush vegetation that is planned for a very significant portion of the site. A major feature of this initial work was the development of the Canada Forest, which was started with a partnership with Natural Resources Canada and its 2020 Fast Forest initiative.

Several residential developers expressed interest in Stanley Greene. Urbancorp was chosen as the first residential developer by Parc Downsview Park after an extensive due diligence process. The first residential development phase at Downsview Park will comprise over 1000 homes. Urbancorp is the largest landowner and developer of residential communities in King West Village and the Queen Street West Triangle area in downtown Toronto. Construction of the new community "Neighbourhood of Downsview Park" is expected to begin in the Autumn of 2012.

In 2013, Mattamy Homes, Canada's largest homebuilder, entered into a joint partnership with Urbancorp, a real estate developer to begin construction on the first residential community in the park. Local councillor Maria Augimeri said that the development was unlikely to appease angry residents who had expected a park to be developed on the land.

In 2014, the City of Toronto once again attempted to acquire control of the park. The federal government rejected the proposal, saying it would not consider transferring responsibility over the park to the city. The Toronto Star obtained a memo indicating that the government did not want to consider transferring the park because of its immense value.

=== Notable events ===
The property has been the site of several high-profile events, including two Papal visits by Pope John Paul II, in 1984 (while still an active military base) and 2002 (World Youth Day), as well as the Molson Canadian Rocks for Toronto concert in 2003 featuring The Rolling Stones, AC/DC, and many others. The Canadian music festival Edgefest also took place in Downsview Park for the last two years with Linkin Park, Stone Temple Pilots, The Sam Roberts Band, Billy Talent, AFI, Alexisonfire and Metric performing.

Edgefest returned to the park in 2011 and 2012. Since 2012 the VELD Music Festival has been held at the park. The Tragically Hip performed to a crowd of approximately 30,000 on Canada Day 2011. On 16 June 2012, a temporary stage collapsed an hour before gates opened for a scheduled Radiohead concert, killing one person and injuring three others. In 2012, the Junior Caribana festival was moved to the park.

== Geography ==
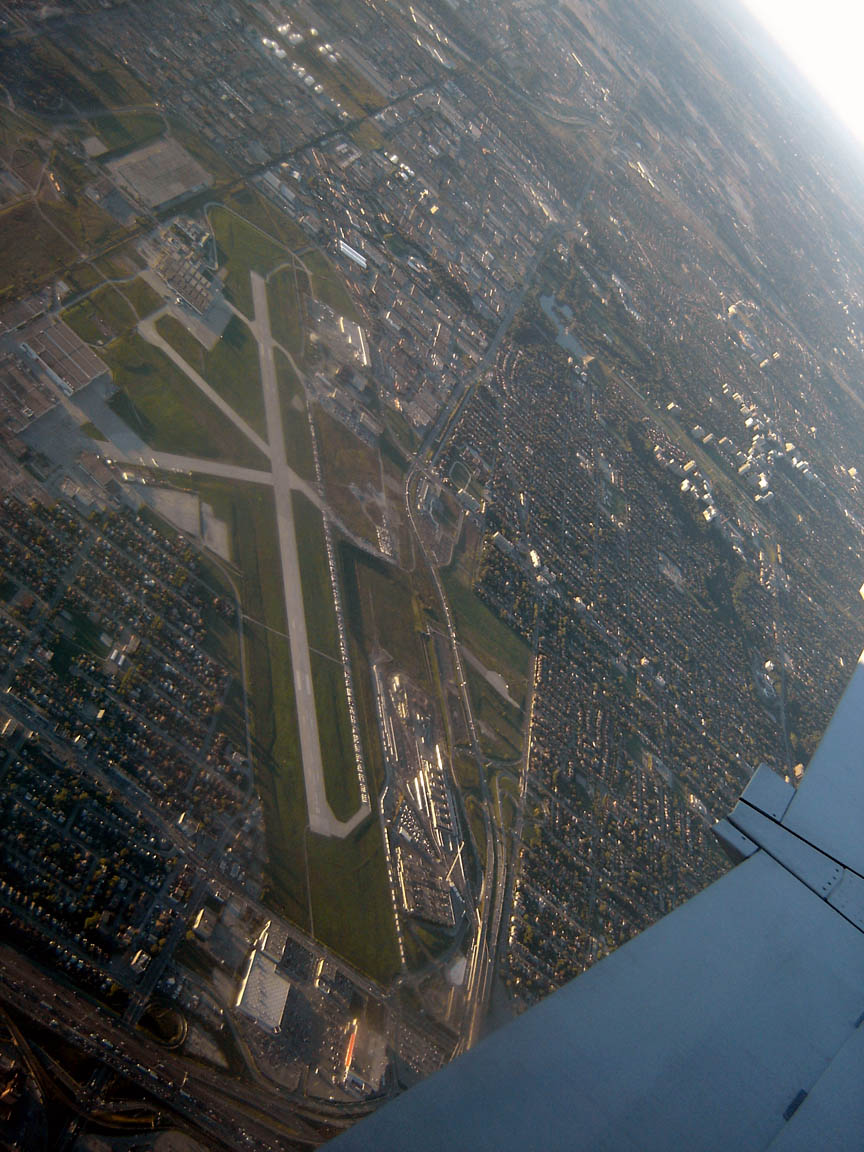
Aerial view of the runway of the Toronto/Downsview Airport at Downsview Park

Downsview Park consists of 231.5 hectares (572 acres) of land in the northwest portion of the City of Toronto and the geographic centre of the Greater Toronto Area. These lands were originally home to de Havilland Aircraft of Canada (1929–1947) and then as the RCAF Station/air force base CFB Downsview from 1947 until April 1, 1996, when the base closed. It was also announced that the lands were to be held in perpetuity and in trust as a "unique urban recreational green space for the enjoyment of future generations."

The mandate to create the urban recreational green space was given to Parc Downsview Park Inc. (PDP) in 1996 and the title to 231.5 hectares (572 acres) of the Downsview Lands was transferred to PDP in 2006 in order to facilitate the development of Downsview Park. The Department of National Defence (DND) retained 29 hectares (72 acres) of the land to accommodate ongoing military needs. Approximately 150 hectares (370 acres) of the land adjacent to the Downsview Lands (including Toronto's oldest operational airport) is under the jurisdiction of Bombardier Aerospace. A rail line that is used mostly by GO Transit trains runs through the centre of the park.

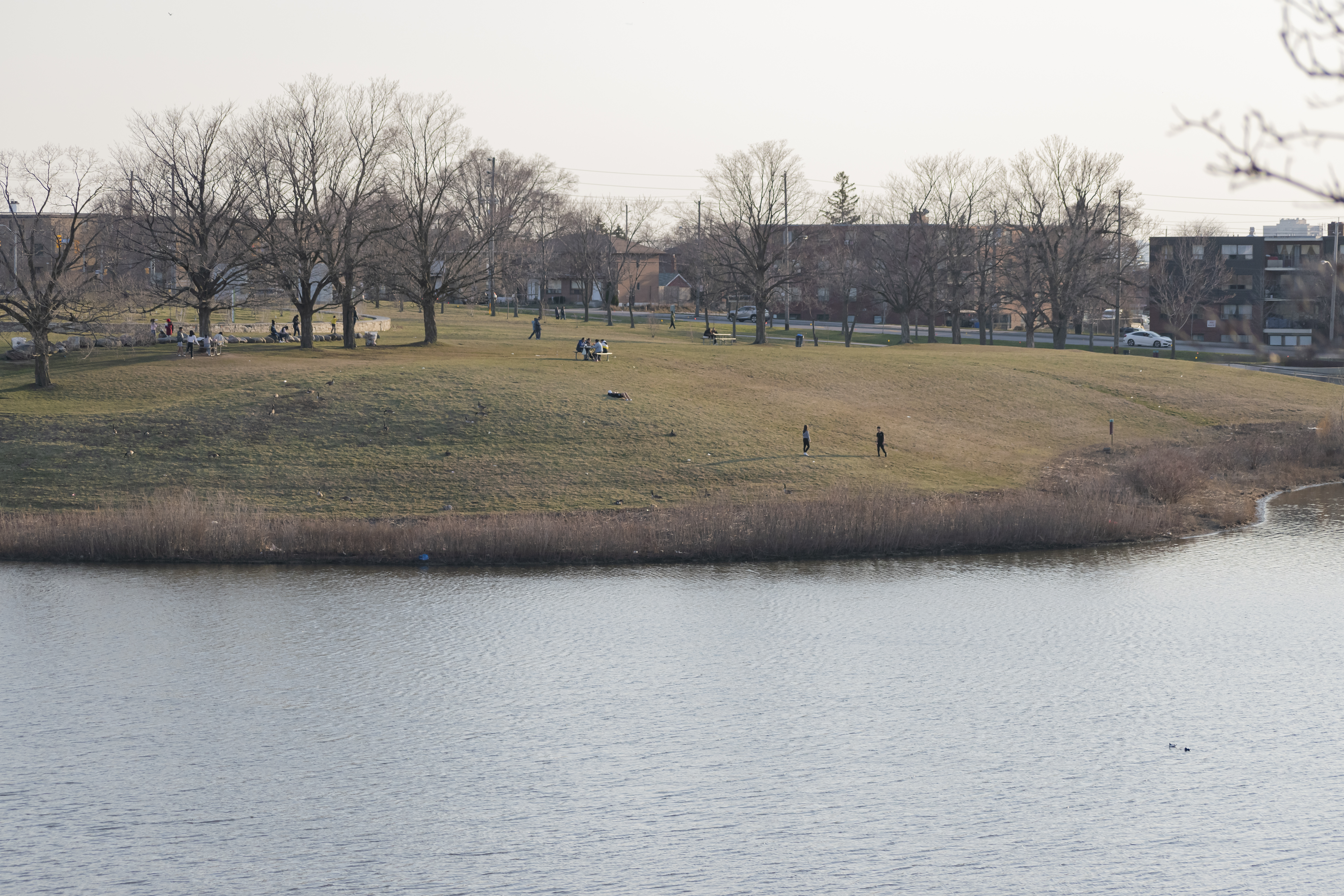
Man made pond in Downsview park

As the mandate for the park requires that it be developed on a self-financing basis, approximately 102 hectares (250 acres) are dedicated to opportunities that provide a revenue stream to finance the construction, development and management of Downsview Park as an integrated, sustainable community.

The park features a large man-made pond on the Keele Street side. Although it is an artificial body of water, the water from it flows out to the Downsview Dells ravines and eventually into Black Creek.

=== Public transport access ===
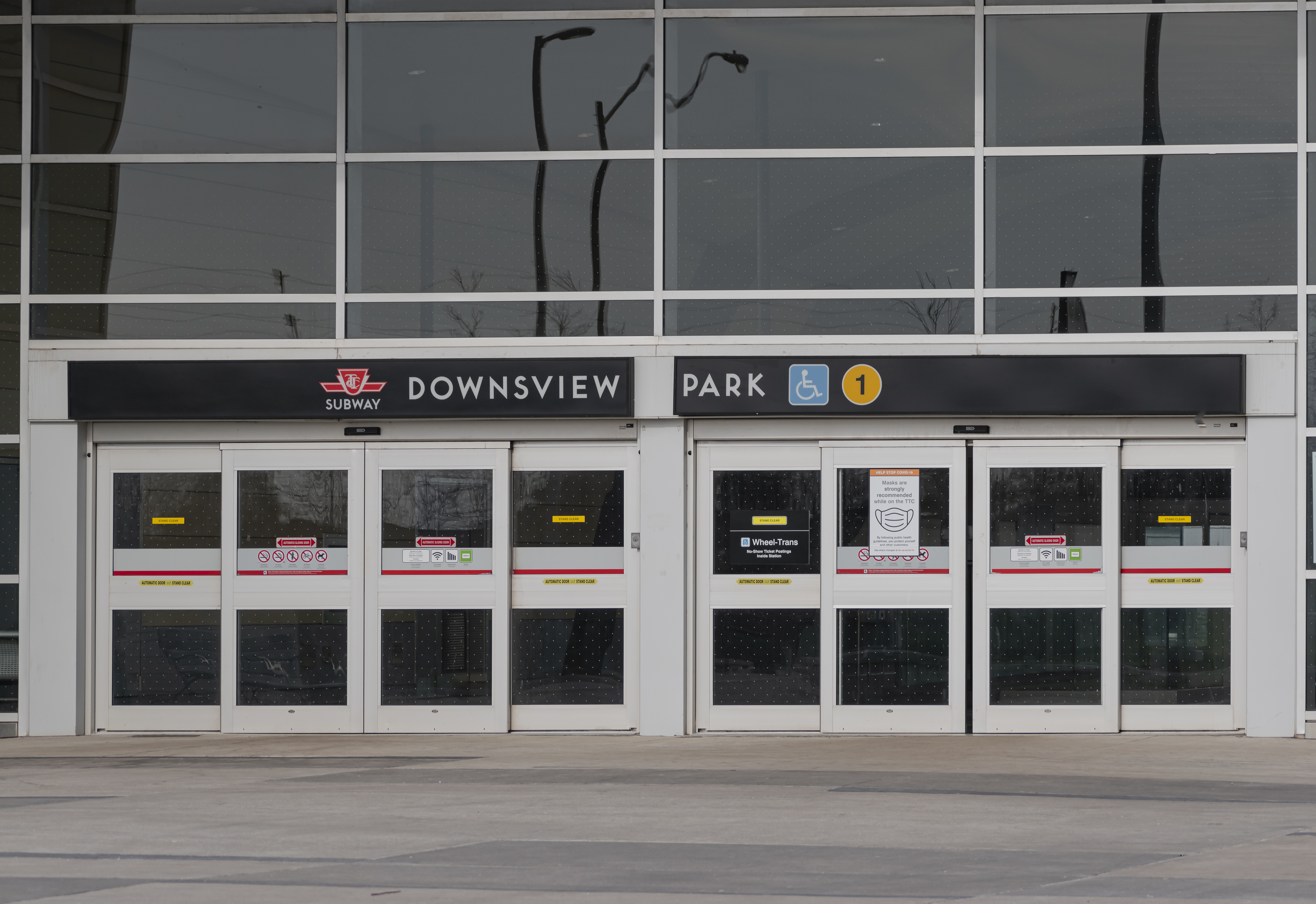
One of the entrances of Downsview Park Subway station

From 1996 to 2017, the closest Toronto subway station to Downsview Park was Downsview station, which served as a terminal station of Line 1 Yonge–University. Situated near the eastern edge of the park across from Downsview Airport, the station was renamed Sheppard West in advance of a northern extension of Line 1, which opened on December 17, 2017. Since 2008, route 101 Downsview Park operated by the Toronto Transit Commission (which also operates the subway) serves the grounds of Downsview Park directly.

Downsview Park station opened on December 17, 2017 as part of the Line 1 subway extension into Vaughan. This station is located at the park's north end and serves as an intermodal interchange with the Barrie line, part of GO Transit's commuter rail services. The 101 Downsview Park operates daily between Downsview Park station and the new Stanley Greene community located south of the urban park, while also serving the Centennial College Downsview Campus and Aerospace Hub on Carl Hall Road.

=== Sports Centre ===
The Downsview Park Sports Centre is a 45,000 square metres (480,000 square feet) multi-purpose facility, formerly an aircraft hangar for the de Havilland Aircraft Company and later the Canadian Forces. Downsview Park's most regular attraction is The Hangar, an indoor recreational facility within the Downsview Park Sports Centre, which accommodates approximately 600,000 visitors per year to its soccer, ball hockey and beach volleyball facilities alone. Winter 2011 saw the welcome addition of a domed field, expanding winter field availability. During the summer of 2009, Toronto Roller Derby started playing their home games at Downsview, using a space in the Downsview Park Sports Centre's west end.

In the summer of 2011, Toronto Roller Derby moved to another space in the park known as The Bunker, and hosted the inaugural Roller Derby World Cup in that space in early December 2011. The Downsview Park Sports Centre also accommodates K1 Speed indoor electric go-karting (aka green go-karting), the HoopDome basketball facility, The Rail Skatepark skateboard destination, True North Climbing indoor rock climbing gym and Blyth Academy Downsview Park School for Elite Athletes. The National Squash Academy, operated by former World #1 player Jonathon Power is a recent addition to the Sports Centre. In October 2013 Scotiabank Pond, a 4 pad ice rink was opened, and was renamed in February 2015 to Scotiabank Pond.

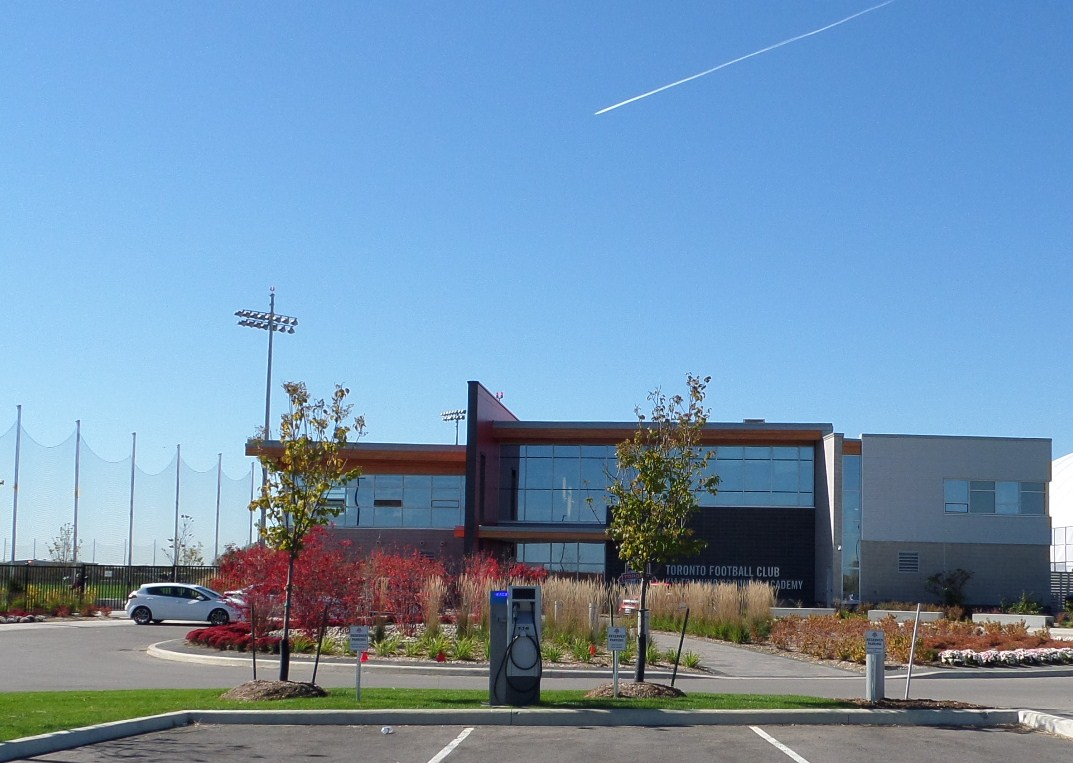
Toronto FC's BMO Training Ground and Academy

BMO Training Ground, the practice facility of Toronto FC of Major League Soccer (MLS) and its minor league reserve team Toronto FC II of MLS Next Pro, and the home of the TFC Academy of MLS Next, is located in Downsview Park. The facility, which opened in 2012, features a stadium with 1000 seats.

Volleyball Canada made the Downsview Park Sports Centre their new headquarters and training facility in 2011. A new four-pad ice complex will be another welcome amenity scheduled to open in 2013.

Operations at the Downsview Park Sports Centre generate funds to help build Downsview Park.

TMU Bold soccer teams have been using the outdoor soccer field as their home field.

== Partnerships ==
Downsview Park is also home to the Toronto Wildlife Centre, the Downsview Park Film and Television Studios and the Downsview Park Arts Alliance, all of which not only pay rent to assist PDP in meeting its self-financing requirements, but also help to animate the site with a variety of programs and activities, many of which are run in partnership with PDP.
