= 32 Service Battalion =

Battalion of the 32 Canadian Brigade Group

32nd (Reserve) Service Battalion 32 Service Battalion
- Active: 1 November 1901 – present
- Country: Canada
- Branch: Primary Reserve
- Type: Combat service support
- Part of: 32 Canadian Brigade Group
- Garrison/HQ: LCol George Taylor Denison III Armoury; Toronto, Ontario
- Mottos: Latin: Servire cum gloria, lit. 'To serve with pride'
- March: Cock o' the North

Commanders
- Commanding Officer: LCol W. Sett
- Regimental Sergeant Major: CWO D. Allaway

Insignia
NATO Map Symbol
32 CBG
4 Cdn Div
- Official Website: https://www.canada.ca/en/army/corporate/4-canadian-division/32-service-battalion.html

32 Service Battalion (32 Svc Bn) is a reserve combat service support (CSS) unit within the Canadian Army. The unit is formed under command of 32 Canadian Brigade Group in the 4th Canadian Division. The Service Battalion is composed of soldiers from the Corps of Royal Canadian Electrical and Mechanical Engineers and Royal Canadian Logistics Service to include: vehicle technicians, weapons technicians, cooks, financial service administrators, human resource administrators, material management technicians and mobile support equipment operators. It is located at LCol George Taylor Denison III Armoury in Toronto, Ontario.

== History ==
=== Formation ===
32 Service Battalion traces its roots from No. 2 Company Canadian Army Service Corps (CASC), Non-Permanent Active Militia. The Canadian Army Service Corps was formed under General Order 141 on 1 November 1901 with four companies No. 1 (London), No. 2 (Toronto), No. 3 (Kingston), and No. 4 (Montreal). A second Toronto Company was formed in February 1907 as No.12 Company (Toronto). After some reorganizations, the companies were reformed as No. 2 Divisional Train CASC (NPAM), later in 1936 reformed as the 2nd Division Column RCASC, and in 1954 as No. 5 Column RCASC.

Furthermore, 32 Service Battalion incorporates elements from Royal Canadian Ordnance Corps (RCOC), Non-Permanent Active Militia. The Canadian Ordnance Corps (COC) formed on 1 July 1903 replacing the Canadian Stores Department and a Non-Permanent Active Militia component formed on 1 April 1912 in Toronto as No. 2 Detachment Canadian Ordnance Corps (NPAM). The Corps of the Royal Canadian Electrical and Mechanical Engineers (RCEME) was subsequently formed separating from the Royal Canadian Ordnance Corps on 1 February 1944. In Toronto, No. 2 Detachment Canadian Ordnance Corps (NPAM) later became No. 2 Army Field Workshop RCOC and eventually 4 Ordnance Battalion RCOC. The RCEME offshoot of the RCOC became No. 2 (Reserve) Armoured Brigade Workshop RCEME and later 4 Technical Regiment RCEME.

On 1 January 1965, No. 5 Column RCASC, 4 Ordnance Battalion RCOC, and 4 Technical Regiment RCEME, along with elements from 2 Provost Company RCPC, 2 Medical Battalion RCAMC, and 56 Dental Unit RCDC among other units were reformed into Service Battalions bringing together several corps into one organization as a new service support concept, which was adopted nationally in 1968. 1st Toronto Service Battalion was lodged at the Denison Armoury in North York, the former home of No. 5 Column RCASC, under the command of LCol Bruce J. Legge. It consisted of 134 Company RCASC, 12 Ordnance Company, 45 Technical Squadron, and 2 Company C Pro C. As part of the 1965 reorganization, a second Service Battalion was also formed as 2nd Toronto Service Battalion under the command of LCol Joe Hansen (originally lodged at Falaise Armoury, but moved to Moss Park Armoury when it first opened in 1966). It consisted of 136 Company RCASC, 13 Ordnance Company, 46 Technical Squadron, and 7 Company C Pro C.

1st Toronto Service Battalion merged with 2nd Toronto Service Battalion on 1 April 1970 to form the Toronto Service Battalion and in 1975 Service Battalions were numbered geographically with Toronto Service Battalion becoming 25 (Toronto) Service Battalion. The unit was later renamed 32 Service Battalion on 13 May 2010.

== Role ==
The role of 32 Service Battalion is to force generate trained soldiers to support Canada's operational requirements domestically and abroad. 32 Service Battalion provides combat service support capabilities to domestics operations such as floods, forest fires, and other domestic crises such as the COVID pandemic. The soldiers of the battalion are part-time soldiers from technical fields plus a small full-time cadre (Regular Force) that facilitates the day-to-day operations of the unit.

== Order of Battle ==
=== Overview ===
32 Service Battalion is a combat service support battalion with 300 soldiers based out of Denison Armouries in Toronto, Ontario. It has an Administration Company, a Maintenance Company (45 Technical Squadron), and a Logistics Company (135 Logistics Company).

=== Companies ===
32 Service Battalion	Branch	Location
Administration Company		Toronto, Ontario
45 Technical Squadron (Maintenance Company)	Royal Canadian Electrical and Mechanical Engineers	Toronto, Ontario
135 Logistics Company (Logistics Company)	Royal Canadian Logistics Service	Toronto, Ontario

== Deployments ==
=== International ===
- Operation ATHENA
- Operation ATTENTION
- Operation IMPACT
  - Op IMPACT Roto 4
  - Op IMPACT Roto 5
  - Op IMPACT Roto 9
  - Op IMPACT Roto 10
- Op REASURANCE
  - Op REASSURANCE 2302
  - Op REASSURANCE 2401
  - Op REASSURANCE 2502
  - Op REASSURANCE 2601
- Op UNIFIER

=== Domestic ===
- Operation LENTUS
- Operation LASER
  - Op LASER 20

== Leadership ==
=== Commanding Officers ===
- 2019–2022: LCol K.M. Perry
- 2022–2025: LCol J. Im
- 2025–present: LCol W. Sett

=== Regimental Sergeant Majors ===
- 2019–2022: CWO A.G. Gliosca
- 2022–2025: CWO D. Henley
- 2025–present: CWO D. Allaway

== Unit Insignia ==
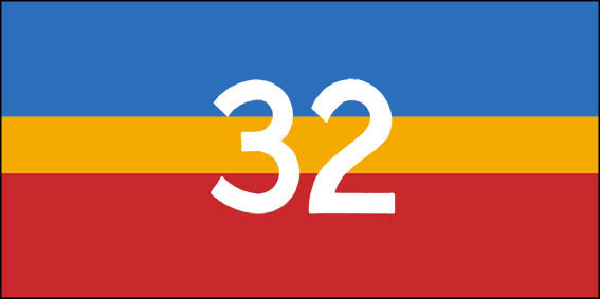
The 32 Service Battalion flag.

The 32 Service Battalion Unit flag has links with the traditions of the founding corps. The official colours of the unit flag are Marine Corps scarlet and oriental blue with an intervening gold stripe and the number 32 emblazoned in the centre. These colours have a history of association with army services. The oriental blue colour of the flag is reminiscent of the old Royal Canadian Ornance Corps (RCOC) flag while the gold colour can be found on the former banners of the Royal Canadian Army Service Corps (RCASC), the RCEME Corps, and the Royal Canadian Army Pays Corps (RCAPC). The red stripe represents the Royal Canadian Engineers.

== Affiliated Cadet Corps ==
2754 Toronto Service Battalion Royal Canadian Army Cadet Corps (RCACC), located at Denison Armoury is affiliated with 32 Service Battalion, parading with the same unit. Formed on November 1, 1963, 2754 Royal Canadian Army Cadet Corps (RCACC) has proudly served youth in the Downsview and greater Toronto area for over six decades. Originally affiliated with 5 Column, Royal Canadian Army Service Corps, the corps later transitioned to 1 Toronto Service Battalion in 1965 and is now affiliated with 32 Service Battalion, operating out of Denison Armoury. Over the years, 2754 has evolved from an all-boys unit into a modern, inclusive program following the integration of female cadets in 1975, while maintaining strong military traditions and standards.

Today, 2754 RCACC delivers a training program focused on leadership, citizenship, and physical fitness, supported by specialized opportunities such as marksmanship and orienteering. Cadets receive structured training and the program includes community involvement, including participation in Remembrance Day ceremonies at York Cemetery.

=== Commanding Officers ===
- 2021-2025: Capt A. Toolsie
- 2025–present: Capt A. Lam

== See also ==
- Military history of Canada
- Canadian Armed Forces
- History of the Canadian Army
- Canadian Army
- 4th Canadian Division
- 32 Canadian Brigade Group
- Corps of Royal Canadian Electrical and Mechanical Engineers
- Royal Canadian Logistics Service
- Royal Canadian Army Service Corps
- Royal Canadian Ordnance Corps
- Primary Reserve
