= 32 Combat Engineer Regiment =

- Active: 14 January 1876–present
- Country: Canada
- Branch: Canadian Army
- Type: Combat Engineers
- Role: To permit friendly forces to live, move and fight on the field of battle and to deny the same to the enemy.
- Size: 2 squadrons
- Part of: 32 Canadian Brigade Group; 4th Canadian Division
- Garrison/HQ: Denison Armoury, Toronto, Ontario, Canada
- Motto: Ubique (Latin for 'everywhere')
- March: Wings
- Website: Official website

Commanders
- Colonel-in-chief: The King
- Commanding officer: Lieutenant-Colonel Ian Chen, CD
- Regimental sergeant major: Chief Warrant Officer Steven Bromfield, CD

32 Combat Engineer Regiment (32 CER) is the Primary Reserve unit of the Royal Canadian Engineers in Toronto, Ontario, Canada. It is assigned to 32 Canadian Brigade Group, part of 4th Canadian Division.

The unit parades Friday evenings at the Denison Armoury. It was formerly known as the 2nd Field Engineer Regiment (2 FER) before being renamed in 2006.

== Unit history ==
Militia Order No. 1 dated 14 January 1876 authorized the formation of the Toronto Engineer Company. This name was changed in October of the same year to the 2nd Military District Engineer Company, although it continued to be known by the original name. The establishment of the company called for two officers and 39 other ranks, however at the time of formation the actual strength was five officers and seventy other ranks which included a band of 18.

The company's first commanding officer was Lieutenant Colonel Thomas Clarkson Scoble. With no established engineer stores and no trained instructors, his problems were numerous. Lt Col Scoble located a retired non-commissioned officer (NCO) of the Royal Engineers living in Toronto, persuaded him to become the Training NCO of the Engineer Company, and then paid from his own pocket for the supplies and equipment necessary to train his men as sappers.

Members of the regiment have long been innovators. In 1909 Lieutenants J.A.D. "Jack" McCurdy and Frederick W. "Casey" Baldwin made Canada's first powered flight in the Silver Dart at Baddeck, Nova Scotia and conducted the first military aircraft demonstration at Petawawa, Ontario later that same year.

32 Combat Engineer Regiment perpetuates the 2nd Field Company, 1st Canadian Divisional Engineers of the First World War's Canadian Corps. Sappers from the regiment also went overseas in 1918 as a key part of the 4000 man Canadian Contingent sent to open a new front in Siberia.

Again deployed during the Second World War as part of the Divisional Engineers of the 2nd Canadian Infantry Division, they took part in the Dieppe Raid in 1942. Thereafter the component companies of the regiment distinguished themselves fighting throughout the European Campaign following the D-Day invasion in Normandy.

After the war, the unit was re-designated 2nd Field Engineer Regiment. As a unit of Military District No. 2, it retained the role of being the engineers of the 2nd Infantry Division, the headquarters of which was also the responsibility of Military District No. 2 to form on mobilization.

As 2 FER, the regiment was called out in 1954 to provide disaster relief and aid to the Greater Toronto Area in the aftermath of Hurricane Hazel. The most notable contribution was the Old Finch Avenue Bailey Bridge, which remains in use today. Thirty years later, 2 FER became the one and only unit to ever receive the Freedoms of all six Cities and the Borough that now form Metropolitan Toronto. On November 23, 2006, by order of the Honourable Gordon O'Connor Minister of National Defence, 2nd Field Engineer Regiment became 32 Combat Engineer Regiment.

== Organization ==
There are currently two field squadrons, and a regimental headquarters in 32 CER:

- 2 Field Squadron provides general engineer support to the brigade and consists of two field troops and a support troop.
- 47 Field Squadron is a training squadron.
- RHQ is composed of the regimental command staff, ops and training staff, and administration and logistics personnel.

== Armoury ==
Site	Date(s)	Designated	Location	Description	Image
LCol George Taylor Denison III Armoury; 1 Yukon Lane			Toronto, Ontario	large centrally located building which houses 32 Canadian Brigade Group Headquarters; The Governor General's Horse Guards; 2 Intelligence Company; 32 Combat Engineer Regiment; 32 Service Battalion; 32 Military Police Platoon; 2 Area Support Group Signal Squadron Charlie Troop; ASU Toronto; LFCA HQ; JTF(C) HQ.	

== Order of precedence ==
Preceded by 31 Combat Engineer Regiment (The Elgins)	32 Combat Engineer Regiment	Succeeded by 33 Combat Engineer Regiment of Canadian Military Engineers

== See also ==
- List of armouries in Canada
- Military history of Canada
- History of the Canadian Army
- Canadian Forces
