= Col J. R. Barber Armoury =

Col J.R. Barber Armoury

General information
- Type: Drill hall / armoury
- Location: Georgetown, Ontario, 91 Todd Road
- Current tenants: Halton Company – The Lorne Scots, Lorne Scots Pipes and Drums, 676 Lorne Scots Army Cadet Corps, 756 Wild Goose Air Cadet Sqn.
- Inaugurated: 1997
- Owner: Canadian Forces

The Georgetown Armoury is a Canadian Forces armoury in Georgetown, Ontario. In the Canadian Forces, an armoury is a place where a reserve unit trains, meets, and parades.

== Houses ==
The armoury is the base of Halton Company – The Lorne Scots, a light infantry regiment that is part of 32 Canadian Brigade Group. The armoury also houses the regiment's Transport Unit, the Lorne Scots Pipes and Drums and two cadet units.

The armoury was built to replace the old Georgetown Armouries (c. 1866) at 1 Park Avenue at the Georgetown Fairgrounds Park. The new building is located at 91 Todd Road, Georgetown, Ontario, and opened in 1997.

Lorne Scots

== See also ==
- List of Armouries in Canada
