= Oakville Armoury =

Coordinates: 43.4445°N 79.6688°W

- Interactive map of the Oakville Armoury area

General information
- Type: Drill Hall / Armoury
- Location: Oakville, Ontario, Canada, 90 Thomas Street
- Current tenants: 'A' company, The Lorne Scots (Peel, Dufferin and Halton Regiment); 1188 Lorne Scots Royal Canadian Army Cadet Corps
- Completed: 1924
- Owner: Department of National Defence

Oakville Armoury is a Canadian Department of National Defence facility located at 90 Thomas Street in Oakville, Ontario. The nearest major intersection is Lakeshore Rd and Trafalgar Rd. It is the home of 'A' company, The Lorne Scots (Peel, Dufferin and Halton Regiment) and the 1188 Lorne Scots Royal Canadian Army Cadet Corps.

The armoury is considered by its residents to be the "Smallest Armoury in NATO", consisting of a few offices, a small mess, and an adequate parade square. The armoury is used by 'A' Company of the Lorne Scots and the Oakville Army Cadets for weekly training which involves mainly infantry and army cadet related training. The Oakville armoury is the smallest of the three armouries operated by The Lorne Scots. The largest is the armoury in Georgetown.

== See also ==
- List of Armouries in Canada
