= Moss Park =

- Neighbourhood
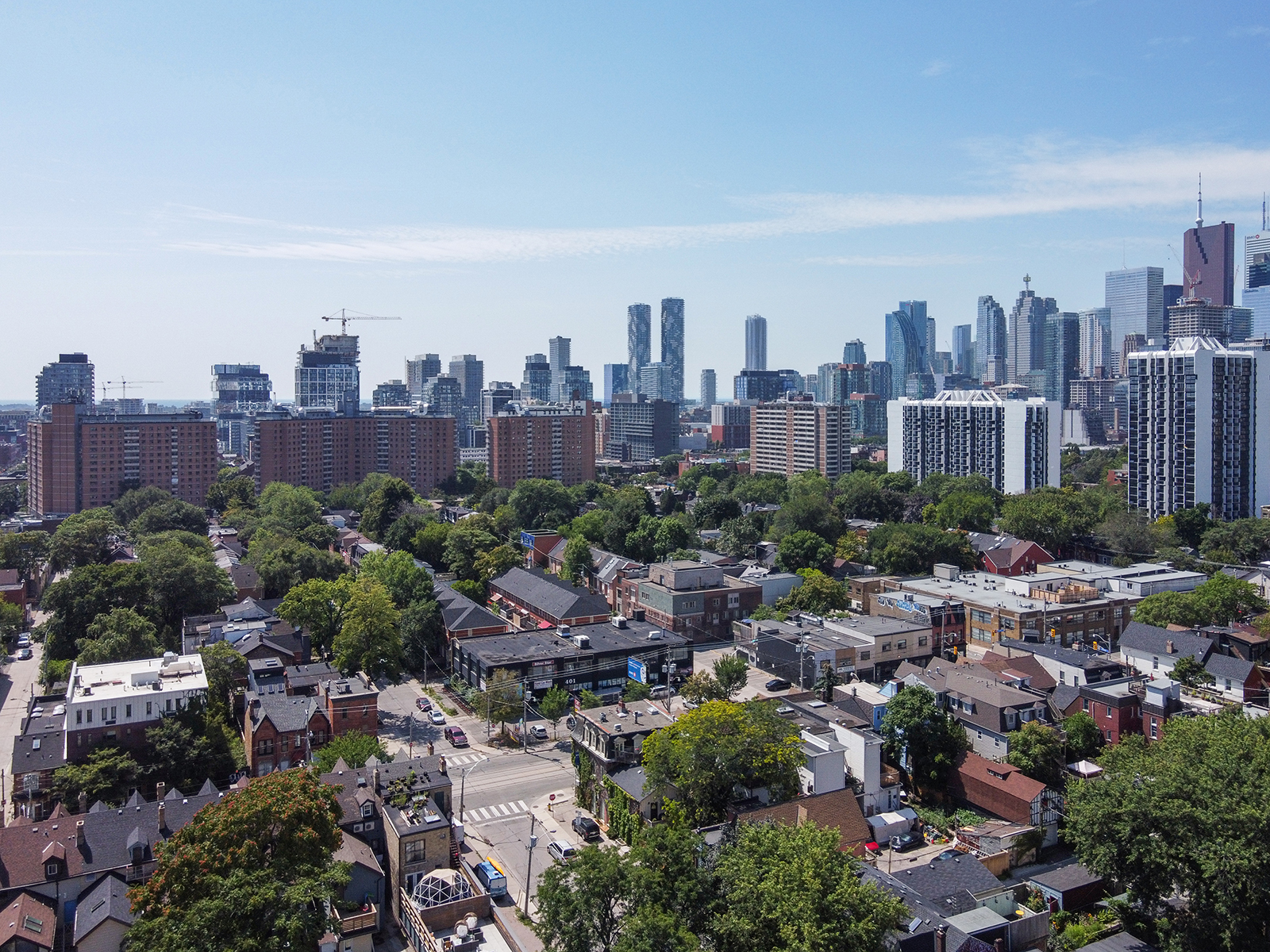
- In the 1960s, many buildings were demolished to make way for large public housing towers

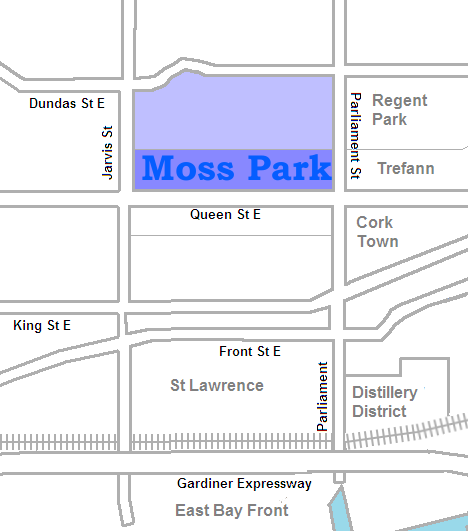
- The Moss Park towers all lie south of Shuter St, but the area north to Dundas is also sometimes considered part of the neighbourhood

- Location within Toronto
- Coordinates: 43.655709°N 79.367316°W
- Country: Canada
- Province: Ontario
- City: Toronto

Moss Park is a residential neighbourhood located in downtown Toronto, Ontario, Canada. The area known as Moss Park is typically considered to be between Jarvis Street and Parliament Street, south of Dundas Street and North of Queen Street, an area dominated by public housing projects. According to one set of boundaries of the City of Toronto, it is roughly L-shaped, bounded on the north by Carlton Street to Parliament Street, on the east by Parliament Street to Queen Street East and the Don River, on the south by Eastern Avenue and Front Street, and on the west by Jarvis Street. This larger concept of the area includes the neighbourhoods known as Corktown and the Garden District, as well as a portion of Cabbagetown.

== Character ==
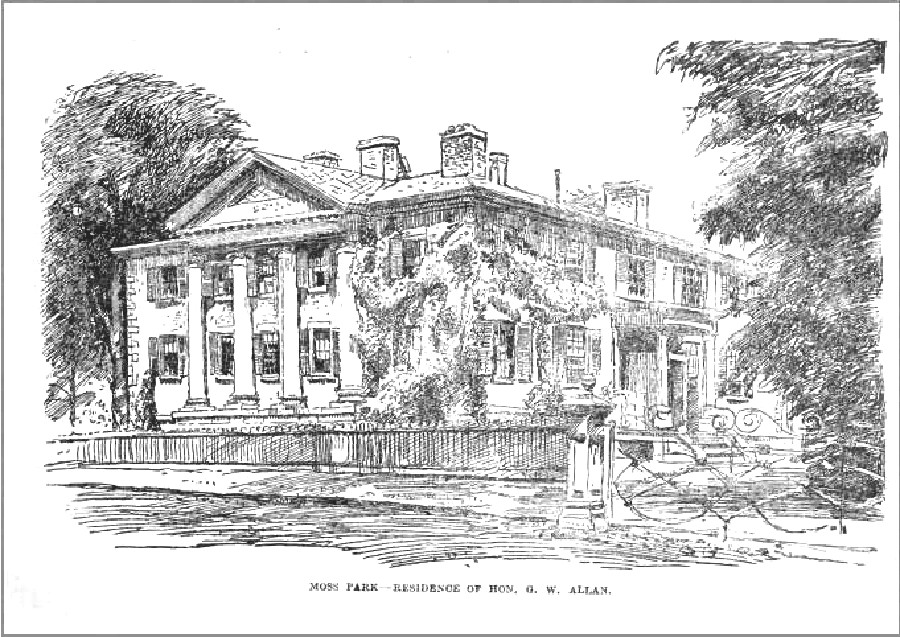
'Moss Park', home of George Allan

The neighbourhood is named for the abundant moss that grew on the original estate of the Allan family (which included William Allan and his son, George Allan), whose mansion stood on the west side of Sherbourne street, between Queen and Shuter streets. The Allan family's former mansion was later demolished during the 1960s 'urban renewal' redevelopment of the area into a housing project, with a large park and community centre on the site of the old estate.

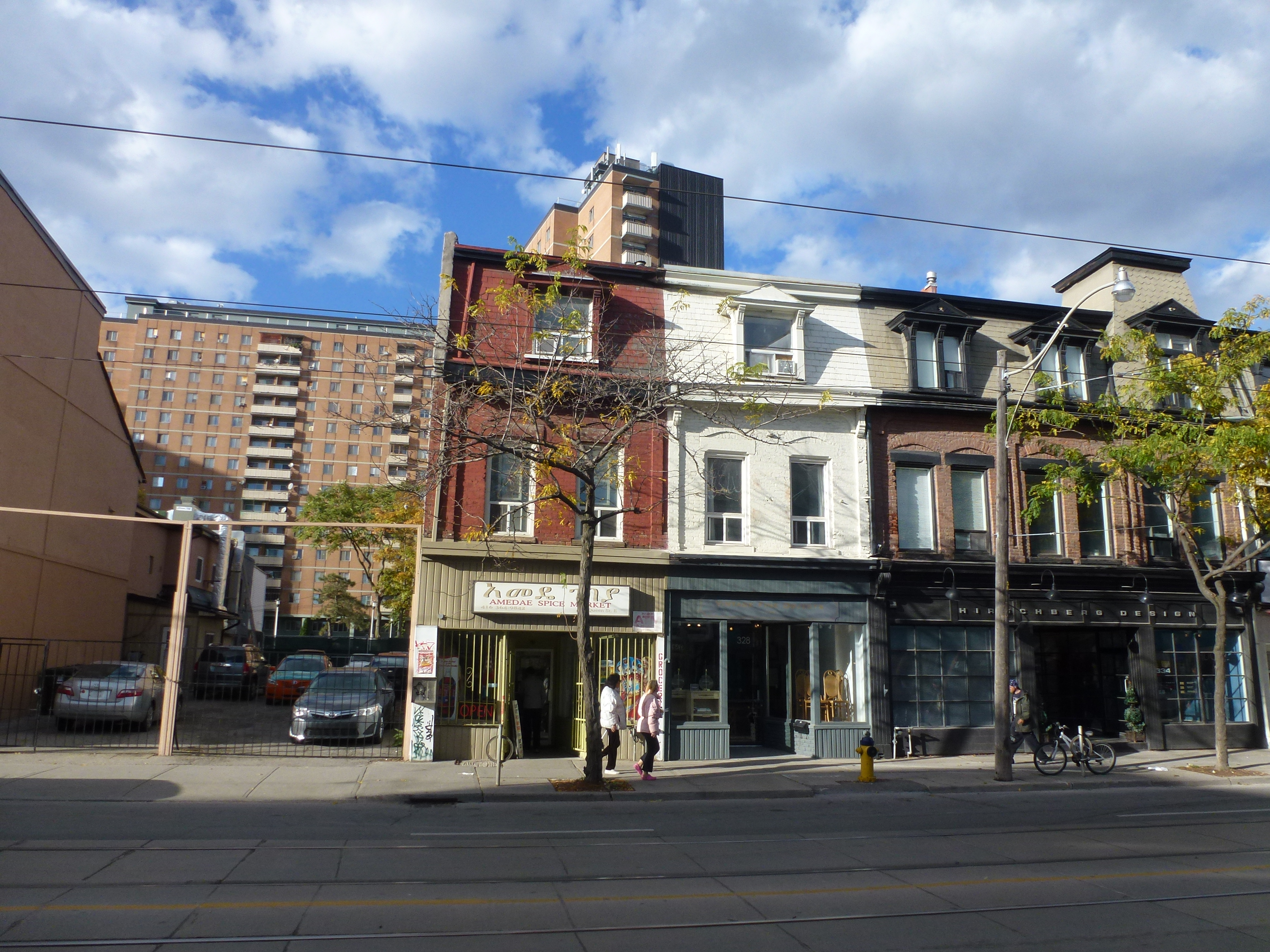
View of Moss Park from Queen Street East and Parliament Street

Much of the Moss Park area was originally built to supply homes for the workers in the industrial area to the south of the neighbourhood. During the 1960s, a large number of these buildings were demolished to make way for the Moss Park public housing project, a group of three large towers at Queen and Parliament streets (run by the Toronto Community Housing Corporation).

The neighbourhood immediately around the housing complex is the area typically meant when referring to Moss Park today. This neighbourhood consists almost exclusively of rental units, and it houses many low-income families. According to Toronto Life, "Moss Park has long had a reputation among Torontonians as a notoriously downtrodden and dangerous neighbourhood." It is home to several homeless shelters.

The northeast corner of Jarvis and Queen streets is occupied by Moss Park Armoury, which is used by several regiments of the Canadian Forces Primary Reserve. These include the 25 Field Ambulance, the 48th Highlanders of Canada, the 7th Toronto Regiment Royal Canadian Artillery, and the Queen's Own Rifles of Canada. Several cadet units also use the facility.

Along Queen Street, the predominant building style is the three to five-storey building, with retail businesses on the ground floor and walk-up apartments on upper floors.

=== Landmarks ===
- Moss Park Armoury
- 252 Queen Street East – Kim's Convenience store front used by the television show of the same name

== Transportation ==
The 501 Queen Street and 505 Dundas Street streetcar routes operate east-west in the neighbourhood. Bus routes include the 75 Sherbourne along Sherbourne from Rosedale to Queen's Quay, and the 65 Parliament Street bus from Castle Frank subway station south to the Esplanade.

The Ontario Line light metro line will have an underground station located in the neighborhood named Moss Park located under Queen Street East between George Street and Sherbourne Street. The line will provide a fast connection to Downtown Toronto, Exhibition Place, and transfers with three other lines in the Toronto subway network.

== In popular culture ==
The neighbourhood is the main setting for the TV series Kim's Convenience and features in many on-location shoots.

The Canadian TV series Murdoch Mysteries, Season 15-episode 18, “Patriot Games” (set in the year 1909) includes a fictional Korean family with the surname Park. In the final moments of the episode the series pays homage to Moss Park, as the characters are brainstorming the creation of a Korean neighborhood in Toronto’s future.
