= List of armouries in Canada =

A number of armouries and drill halls exist in communities across Canada. Of these, the majority were built in Ontario and Quebec.

== Architecture ==
=== Chief Dominion Architects ===
The Chief Dominion Architect(s) designed a number of prominent public buildings in Canada including armouries, drill halls, post offices, and Dominion Public Buildings : Thomas Seaton Scott (1871–1881); Thomas Fuller (1881–1897); David Ewart (1897–1914); Edgar Lewis Horwood (1914–1918); Richard Cotsman Wright (1918–1927); Thomas W. Fuller (1927–1936), Charles D. Sutherland (1936–1947); Joseph Charles Gustave Brault (1947–1952)

Thomas Seaton Scott, Thomas Fuller and Thomas W. Fuller adopted the Dominion Style Neo-Gothic style. David Ewart embraced the Baronial style. The armouries may display Gothic Revival (1740s+), Tudorbethan (1835–1885+), Romanesque Revival (1840–1930); Colonial Revival (1890s+); Châteauesque (1887–1930) or Edwardian Baroque 1901–1922 style.

Drawings for virtually all armoury and drill hall buildings designed by The Chief Dominion Architect and his staff during his tenure as Chief Architect of the Department of Public Works are now held at the National Archives of Canada, Ottawa, Ontario.

In some cases, architects obtained the commission to design these buildings in collaboration with the staff architects in the federal Department of the Militia in Ottawa.

=== Staff architects in the Federal Department of the Militia ===
Militia and defense buildings in Canada which were not designed by the Dept. of Public Works were the responsibility of staff architects in the Federal Department of the Militia. Staff architects inspected and oversaw the design, construction and maintenance of Militia buildings, and designed the Munitions Stores buildings which were often erected adjacent to Drill Hall buildings to store weapons, uniforms, and ammunition. From 1886 to 1893, Henry James served as Chief Architect for the federal Militia Department. Lieutenant Frederick W. White succeeded as Chief Architect for the federal Militia Department 1893–1897. Lieutenant Paul Weatherbe succeeded as Chief Architect and Engineer from 1897 to 1905.

== History ==
During the 1860s, the American Civil War and the Fenian Raids raised fears for the defence of British North America. In response, the Canadian militia was strengthened, and many rural communities erected a drill hall to train their volunteers.

During the early stages of construction, in the 1870s to 1890s, rural militia units, rather than the Department of Defence, were responsible for their construction. Armouries are centrally and prominently located in the historic city or town centers, and are well-known community landmarks.

Eleven drill halls were built in Ontario between 1876 and 1918 to improve the Canadian military as part of a campaign to reform and expand the Active Volunteer Militia. This period of reform turned the Canadian militia from a poorly equipped citizens' militia into an organized, competent fighting unit that was well prepared for the First World War. Designed with classical inspiration, the brick buildings are box-like with a flat roof, stonework on the base, crenellation, and Parapet walls.

From 1896 to 1918 over 100 drill halls and armouries were erected across Canada.

The armouries functioned as training and recruitment centres during First World War, and later for the Second World War and the Korean War. The space generally doubles as an assembly / Lecture hall. Traditionally, armouries serve as the permanent regimental headquarters of the local militia and as a drill hall for Militia practice and training.

The standard North American armoury model incorporates medieval military features such as jutting towers, buttresses, dentilated stringcourses, corbelling, crenellations, battlements and a large troop door reminiscent of a fortified gate. The distinguishing characteristics include functional design, good quality materials, excellent craftsmanship and unobstructed volume of floor space in the drill hall enabled by a gable roof. The foundation is frequently stone with a concrete floor supporting a steel frame. The exterior walls are frequently constructed with red brick and quarry-faced stone generally limestone or sandstone with a course of arched wood sash windows and doors. An armoury generally enclose a large drill hall, messes, classrooms and storage facilities.

A number of ‘Standard Drill Hall Class E’ armouries were built in a straightforward utilitarian design with modest architectural embellishment in an Edwardian Baroque 1901–1922 style. The design incorporates a large, unobstructed drill hall with exposed steel trusses, its gallery and supporting arcades. The decorative Flemish style parapets, towers, crenellated turrets and a low wide arched entrance, reminiscent of a fortified gate show very good craftsmanship. Edwardian Baroque 1901–1922 armouries incorporate distinguishing features such as red brick with a stone foundation, stone sills, window surrounds and decorative shields which contribute to a powerful image of stability and stateliness. To evoke the impression of a medieval castle, the walls incorporate buttresses, parapets, crenellated moulding, corbelled stonework and crenellated towers flanking its troop door. The distinguishing characteristics include double or triple Tudor gothic arches and projecting surround at the front entrance, defence towers, and wall treatments which step out at the corners. To convey an image of solidity and impregnability, the building have small narrow windows, bartizans, and small turrets complete with firing slits.

Armouries constructed in 1920s and 1930s reflect the popularity of Colonial Revival (1890s+) styles derived from simplified French colonial architecture of the Baroque era.

During the 1930s, a number of inter-war armouries were built employing modern structural design with concrete floors supporting a steel frame gable roofed drill hall, the Hipped roof, prominent chimneys and exposed Warren trusses for its large, unobstructed space. The details of its entrance and exhibits the stylized and simplified Châteauesque (1887–1930) style details, which reflect contemporary interests in smooth surfaces and geometric volumes. The distinguishing characteristics include red brick and white limestone round towers, elaborate arched entrances, wood panelled entrance doors, heavy iron hardware and multi-paned glazing which reflect the revivalist design. The decorative elements including Stringcourses, Copings, window trims, concentric Tudor entrance arches, and carved plaques.

The armouries may be National Historic Sites of Canada, and/or classified or recognized as Federal Heritage Buildings because of their historical associations, architectural and environmental values.

During the 1950s, the Department of National Defence used a standard plan for a drill hall on several military bases, designed by the architect firm of Gordon S. Adamson & Associates featuring a simple and unadorned composition, and a standard layout.

== Alphabetical listing (by community) ==
List of armouries
Site	Date(s) & architect	Registered	Location	Description	Image
Colonel James Layton Ralston Armoury; Acadia Street & Agnew Street	1914–1915 David Ewart	Canada's Register of Historic Places; Recognized—1990 Register of the Government of Canada Heritage Buildings	Amherst, Nova Scotia	This large, centrally located stone and brick Baronial style building features two sturdy towers, a triple arched entrance way and a large drill hall. Housed the Nova Scotia Highlanders until 2006, and closed in 2015. Limited use afterwards pending disposal.	
Aurora Armoury; 89 Mosley Street at Larmont Street	1874 Thomas Seaton Scott	1991 Recognized—Register of the Government of Canada Heritage Buildings	Aurora, Ontario	"Built in 1874 as a Dominion style Neo-Gothic style drill shed for the 12th Battalion of Infantry or York Rangers, the Aurora Armoury was part of a network of defence training facilities for citizen soldiers. It evokes the larger stories and traditions of the province's militia regiments, recruited regionally, and possessing close affiliations with their communities of origin. The armoury was also the site of Edward Blake's famous "Aurora speech" of 1874, in which the prominent politician and former Ontario premier called upon the federal government of Liberal Prime Minister Alexander Mackenzie to implement nationalistic and electoral reforms. The speech exemplifies how drill halls and armouries fulfil civic roles in the lives of their communities. Former home to elements of The Queen's York Rangers (1st American Regiment) (RCAC)."	
Baddeck Armoury	1901 David Ewart		Baddeck, Nova Scotia	Centrally located Baronial style building with a hipped-roof.	
Barrie Armoury; 37 Parkside Dr at High Street	1913–1914 David Ewart	1997 Recognized—Register of the Government of Canada Heritage Buildings	Barrie, Ontario	This large, mansard roofed Baronial style structure with sturdy projecting towers and a three-arched entrance is in a residential area near the centre of the city. Houses the Grey and Simcoe Foresters.	Cap Badge of the Grey & Simcoe Foresters
Mulcaster Street Armoury; 36 Mulcaster Street	19th century	Canada's Register of Historic Places	Barrie, Ontario	Small scale, brick armoury features a centre assembly hall with right and left wings, under 3 roofs.	
Col CC Gammon Armoury; 1820 King Avenue			Bathurst, New Brunswick	This centrally located drill hall projects a solid, fortified appearance. Houses the North Shore Regiment.	
Shenley Armoury; 551 Route Kennedy			Beauceville, Quebec		
Beauport Armoury or Building 1 Du Manège Street	1913–1914 David Ewart	Canada's Register of Historic Places; Recognized—1991 Register of the Government of Canada Heritage Buildings;	Beauport, Quebec	Centrally located three-storey, red brick Baronial style drill hall with a low-pitched, gable-roof.	
Belleville Armoury; 187 Pinnacle Road at Bridge Street East	1907–1908 David Ewart	Canada's Register of Historic Places; 1992 Recognized—Register of the Government of Canada Heritage Buildings	Belleville, Ontario	This centrally located, low-pitched gambrel-roofed, stone and brick Baronial style building features a pair of tall towers. Houses the Hastings and Prince Edward Regiment.	
Brampton Armoury; 2 Chapel Street	1914–1915 David Ewart	1991 Recognized—Register of the Government of Canada Heritage Buildings	Brampton, Ontario	This centrally located, mid-size, rectangular Baronial style building has a low-pitched gable roof. Houses "B" Company of the Lorne Scots. The Lorne Scots Regimental Museum is located behind the Brampton Armoury.	
Brandon Armoury; 1116 Victoria Avenue	1907–1908 David Ewart	Canada's Register of Historic Places; Recognized—1994 Register of the Government of Canada Heritage Buildings	Brandon, Manitoba	A solid looking Baronial style structure constructed of brick and stone featuring a three-storey midsection in a mixed commercial and residential area.	
Brantford Armoury; 18 Brant Avenue	1893 Henry James David Ewart	1992 Recognized—Register of the Government of Canada Heritage Buildings	Brantford, Ontario	Centrally located near the War Memorial, this Baronial style drill hall with a low-pitched gable roof is fronted by a monumental, fortress-like façade of brick and stone. Houses the 56th Field Artillery Regiment, RCA.	
Brockville Armoury; 1-9 East Avenue facing 144 King St. E	1900–1901 David Ewart	1990 Recognized—Register of the Government of Canada Heritage Buildings	Brockville, Ontario	This centrally located, large, low-massed, stone structure in the Baronial style features a low-pitched gable roof. Houses the Brockville Rifles.	
Burford Armoury; King Street	1905 David Ewart		Burford, Ontario	This centrally located, large, low-massed, structure in the Baronial style features a low-pitched gable roof.	
Bury Armoury			Bury, Quebec, 45.473534,-71.50114	Formerly housed HQ, The 7th/XIth Hussars.	
Mewata Armoury; 801 11th St. SW	1916–1917 (completed) Edgar Lewis Horwood	1989 National Historic Sites of Canada; Recognized—1984 Register of the Government of Canada Heritage Buildings	Calgary, Alberta; 51°02′45″N 114°05′20″W	Centrally located large-scale, low-massed drill hall in the Tudorbethan style. Houses the Calgary Highlanders (10th Canadians), The King's Own Calgary Regiment, and other units of 41 CBG.	Exterior view of the south side of the Mewata Armoury
Cambridge Armoury; Ainslie Street South	1914–1915 David Ewart	1987 Recognized—Register of the Government of Canada Heritage Buildings	Cambridge, Ontario	This centrally located, brick and stone Baronial style structure features a façade, flanking towers and a low-pitched gable roof; it projects a solid, fortified appearance. Houses the Royal Highland Fusiliers of Canada.	
Water Street Armoury; 169 to 171 Water Street			Campbellton, New Brunswick		
Queen Charlotte Armoury; 3 Haviland Street			Charlottetown, Prince Edward Island		
Chatham Armoury; Colborne Street	1905 David Ewart		Chatham, Ontario	This two-storey, red brick Baronial style structure with a low-pitched gable roof. Houses the Essex and Kent Scottish.	
Coaticook Armoury; Corner of Adams and Highway 147	1914 David Ewart	Formerly housed the '26th Canadian Horse "Stanstead" Dragoons from 1910, and later 'The Eastern Township Mounted Rifles'. Converted to artillery as the '27th Field Brigade, RCA', and reduced to nil strength in 1970.	Coaticook, Quebec	This Baronial style building had a low-pitched gable roof. The structure was demolished in 1975.	
Cobourg Armoury; King Street	1904 David Ewart		Cobourg, Ontario	This Baronial style building has a low-pitched gable roof. Houses the Hastings and Prince Edward Regiment.	
Gallipoli Armoury; O'Connell Drive			Corner Brook, Newfoundland and Labrador	Large centrally located building with a low-pitched gable roof.	
Cornwall Armoury; 505 4th Street East at Marlborough Street	1938–1939 Charles D. Sutherland	1996 Recognized—Register of the Government of Canada Heritage Buildings	Cornwall, Ontario	This centrally located Tudorbethan building with a low-pitched gable roof was constructed of buff-coloured brick with stone trim. Houses The Stormont, Dundas and Glengarry Highlanders, and Stormont, Dundas and Glengarry Highlanders Regimental Museum	
S^{t}-Louis Street Armoury; 250 S^{t}-Louis Street			Drummondville, Quebec		
Dundas Armoury; King Street at Market Street	1900 David Ewart		Dundas, Ontario	Large centrally located Baronial style building with a low-pitched gable roof.	
Durham Armoury; Garafraxa Street	1908 David Ewart		Durham, Ontario	Large centrally located Romanesque Revival building with a low-pitched gable roof.	
Arm Lads Brigade Armoury; PO Box 83; 17 Museum Rd.	1910 David Ewart		Durrell, Newfoundland and Labrador	One-storey red brick structure housing the Durrell Museum	
Connaught Armoury; 85th Avenue	1911 David Ewart	Canada's Register of Historic Places	Edmonton, Alberta	The oldest armoury in Alberta, this two-storey, rectangular brick Baronial style building with a low-pitched gable roof, was built in the historic district to house 19th Alberta Dragoons.	
Lieutenant-Colonel Philip Debney Armoury	2001 HIP and Clark Builders		Edmonton, Alberta	One of the largest armouries in western Canada. Currently houses 20th Field Artillery Regiment, RCA; 41 Service Battalion; 41 Combat Engineer Regiment; and 41 Signal Regiment.	
Prince of Wales Armouries Heritage Centre; 10440 108 Avenue	1913–1915 Donald Norman MacVicar	Canada's Register of Historic Places	Edmonton, Alberta	Two-storey, rectangular brick and sandstone Tudorbethan building with distinctive corner towers evocative of medieval castle design on 0.96 hectares just north of the commercial centre. Houses The Loyal Edmonton Regiment Military Museum, City of Edmonton Archives and Telephone Historical Centre	
Hudson's Bay Company Stables Ortona Armoury; 9722 102 Street	1914 David Ewart	Canada's Register of Historic Places	Edmonton, Alberta	Restored two-storey, U-shaped Baronial style building with load bearing brick walls and stone detailing.	
Brig. James Curry Jefferson Armory			Edmonton, Alberta	Currently houses 6 Intelligence Company; The Loyal Edmonton Regiment (4th Battalion, Princess Patricia's Canadian Light Infantry); and The South Alberta Light Horse.	
Land Titles Building – Victoria Armoury; 10523 100 Avenue	1893 Thomas Fuller	Canada's Register of Historic Places	Edmonton, Alberta	1 1/2-storey Neo-Gothic style building of brick covered in stucco.	
Former Elora Drill Shed; 40 High Street, Centre Wellington	1865 (completed)	1989 National Historic Sites of Canada	Elora, Ontario; 43°40′48.2″N 80°25′44.01″W	"This handsome Tudorbethan stone structure, built in 1865, is a rare surviving example of early drill hall architecture in Canada. During the 1860s, the American Civil War and the Fenian Raids raised fears for the defence of British North America. In response, the Canadian militia was strengthened, and many rural communities erected drill halls to train their volunteers. Notable for its classical proportions, its semicircular fanlight over the door and oculus in the gable, this is an unusually well-constructed building of its type."	
Enderby Drill Hall; George Street	1914 David Ewart		Enderby, British Columbia	Built for $15,000 of Enderby bricks on donated land, the 42 ft × 92 ft (13 m × 28 m) Baronial style building, which previously housed C Squadron BC Horse and the 172nd Battalion Rocky Mountain Rangers, has a birch floor and a single front door.	
Carlton Street Armoury; Campbell Street and Carleton Street			Fredericton, New Brunswick	This centrally located, drill hall projects a solid, fortified appearance. Houses 1st Battalion, the Royal New Brunswick Regiment (Carlton and York), and 1 Engineer Squadron of 37 Combat Engineer Regiment.	
Gagetown Drill Hall	1954 Gordon S. Adamson & Associates	D5 Recognized—2004; H12 Recognized—2004 on the Register of the Government of Canada Heritage Buildings	Arcadia, New Brunswick	Large centrally located building with a low-pitched gable roof.	
Galt Armoury; Mill Street	1914 David Ewart		Galt, Ontario	Large centrally located Baronial style building with a low-pitched gable roof.	
Salaberry Armoury; 188 Alexandre Taché Blvd & and boul S^{t}-Joseph	1938 (completed) Lucien Sarra-Bournet	Canada's Register of Historic Places; Recognized—1993 Register of the Government of Canada Heritage Buildings	Hull Sector Gatineau, Quebec	Centrally located this Romanesque Revival building has a brick front and a steeply pitched gable roof. Houses the Régiment de Hull.	
Col J.R. Barber Armoury; 91 Todd Road		Canada's Register of Historic Places	Georgetown, Ontario	This centrally located structure has a low-pitched gable roof. Houses C Company, Halton Company, The Lorne Scots.	
Lieutenant-Colonel William (Billy) Mulherin; Madawaska Road			Grand Falls, New Brunswick	This centrally located, drill hall projects a solid, fortified appearance. Houses "C" Company of the Royal New Brunswick Regiment, and 314 Squadron Air Cadets.	
Beaumont Hamel Armoury; 1A Memorial Avenue			Grand Falls-Windsor, Newfoundland and Labrador		
Guelph Armoury; Farquahar Street at Wyndham Street	1906–1907 David Ewart	1991 Recognized on the Register of the Government of Canada Heritage Buildings; Canada's Register of Historic Places	Guelph, Ontario	Designed in a late Baronial style, this centrally located massive, fortress-like brick building is heavily ornamented and centrally located on a sloped site. Houses 11th Field Artillery Regiment, RCA.	
Halifax Armoury; 2667 North Park Street at Cunard Street	1895-99 (completed) Thomas Fuller (architect)	National Historic Sites of Canada; Classified—1991 Register of the Government of Canada Heritage Buildings	Halifax, Nova Scotia	This large, urban, Neo-Gothic style drill hall, was built for the active militia, of red rough faced brick. Houses 1st (Halifax-Dartmouth) Field Artillery Regiment, and the Princess Louise Fusiliers.	
John Weir Foote Armoury; 200 James Street North	1887 Henry James 1888-1908 Thomas Fuller (architect)/ David Ewart	1989 National Historic Sites of Canada;1991 Classified on the Register of the Government of Canada Heritage Buildings	Hamilton, Ontario; 43°15′42.76″N 79°51′58.42″W	Named after John Weir Foote, one large Neo-Gothic style Dominion style complex is composed of two armouries. The north section of the building is representative of the second evolutionary stage in drill hall construction in Canada (in the 1870s to 1890s). Houses Argyll and Sutherland Highlanders of Canada (Princess Louise's); the Royal Hamilton Light Infantry (Wentworth Regiment); 11th Field Artillery Regiment, RCA, and 31 Signal Regiment.	Exterior view of the John Weir Foote Armoury
Indian Head Armoury; 708 Otterloo Street	1914 Engineer Service Branch, Dep't of Militia and Defence	Standard Armoury Plan Type A	Indian Head, Saskatchewan	Baronial style. Formally opened 18 February 1914 by Colonel Sam Steele then commander of Military Division 10, Winnipeg. Originally housed C Squadron of the 16th Light Horse Regiment.	
Joliette Armoury; Park Street	1909 David Ewart		Joliette, Quebec	This Baronial style structure is centrally located.	
JR Vicars Armoury; 1221 Mcgill Rd	1902 David Ewart		Kamloops, British Columbia	This Baronial style structure is centrally located. Houses the Rocky Mountain Rangers.	
Brigadier Angle Armoury; 720 Lawrence Avenue	1904 David Ewart	Canada's Register of Historic Places; Recognized—1997 Register of the Government of Canada Heritage Buildings	Kelowna, British Columbia	One-storey, T-shaped Baronial style structure with a hipped-roof, clad in aluminum siding.	
Kingston Drill Hall; 100 Montreal Street	1899-1899 David Ewart	1989 Classified on the Register of the Government of Canada Heritage Buildings	Kingston, Ontario	This two-storey, heavy stone Baronial style structure is in a residential and commercial district in the former Royal Artillery Park. Houses the Princess of Wales' Own Regiment and Princess of Wales' Own Regiment Military Museum.	
Kitchener Armoury; 350 East Avenue			Kitchener, Ontario	Houses Waterloo Region Corp 1596 (Royal Canadian Army Cadets) & KW Spitfire Squadron (Royal Canadian Air Cadets). Features the 6 ft 4 in-high (1.93 m) bronze Second World War Canadian Women's Army Corps monument, built in 2000 by André Gauthier.	
Lévis Armoury; 10 de l'Arsenal Street; St. David Street at St. Antoine Street	1911–1914 David Ewart	Canada's Register of Historic Places; Recognized—1991 Register of the Government of Canada Heritage Buildings;	Lévis, Quebec	This centrally located two-storey Baronial style stone structure has a copper hipped roof. Houses the Le Régiment de la Chaudière.	
London Armoury; Dundas, Richmond, Wellington and King Street	1902–1903 David Ewart	Canada's Register of Historic Places	London, Ontario	This large centrally located Baronial style building has a low-pitched gable roof. Closed by the Department of National Defence in 1976 and converted into a hotel in 1988.	
Matane Armoury; 374 St. Jerome Street	1913 David Ewart	Canada's Register of Historic Places; Recognized—1991 Register of the Government of Canada Heritage Buildings	Matane, Quebec	Centrally located two-storey, red brick Baronial style building with a green-painted, metal clad hipped roof.	
Main Street and McLeod Avenue, combined Post Office and Armoury.	1910, with 1913 addition		Melfort, Saskatchewan	Location of C Company, Saskatoon Light Infantry, 1936. Romanesque style Post Office with 2 1/2 storey main building joined to a 1-storey hipped roof armoury facing McLeod Avenue. Modern steam heating, electrical lighting, and a corner tower of brick and Tyndall stone that housed a clock from Smith & Son of Derby, England purchased for $1,500. In total, the cost of the brick and stone building was over $50,000.	
Middleton Armoury; 150 Commercial Street	1902 David Ewart	Canada's Register of Historic Places; Recognized—1993 Register of the Government of Canada Heritage Buildings	Middleton, Nova Scotia	Centrally located, Baronial style building with wooden construction and classical detailing.	
George Street Armoury; George Street			Miramichi, New Brunswick		
Moncton armoury			Moncton, New Brunswick	Houses the 8th Canadian Hussars	
Canadian Grenadier Guards' Armoury; 4171 Esplanade Avenue	1913–1914 Donald Norman MacVicar	Canada's Register of Historic Places; Recognized—1994 Register of the Government of Canada Heritage Buildings	Montreal, Quebec	Large, two-storey, brick Baronial style drill hall with a low-pitched gable roof is on a residential streetscape in Montreal.	
Black Watch Armoury; 2067 Bleury Street	1905–1906 (completed) Samuel Arnold Finley and David Jerome Spence	2008 National Historic Sites of Canada;Recognized—1994 Register of the Government of Canada Heritage Buildings	Montreal, Quebec; 45°30′28.37″N 73°34′11.38″W	The centrally located two-storey, brick Baronial style drill hall with a stone-clad façade is home to the Black Watch (Royal Highland Regiment) of Canada and regimental museum, one of Canada's oldest regiments and its oldest surviving Highland Regiment; a testament to the important roles played by armouries in Canada's military history.	View of the entrance to the Black Watch Armoury in Montreal
Côte des Neiges Armoury; 4185 Chemin de la Côte des Neiges	1934–1935 Thomas W. Fuller	Canada's Register of Historic Places; Recognized—1991 Register of the Government of Canada Heritage Buildings	Montreal, Quebec	This Châteauesque structure has its front door on Cote de Neiges, and a large side door off an interior riding ring, sits on a treed site on the southwest perimeter of Mount Royal Park. Houses the Royal Canadian Hussars (Montreal), and the 2nd Field Regiment, Royal Canadian Artillery.	
Craig Street Drill Hall; Craig Street	1867		Montreal, Quebec	Constructed to house all of Montreal's militia units, and built jointly by the city, militia, and federal government. Roof collapsed in 1872 and was rebuilt. Demolished to make way for the Ville-Marie Expressway.	
Victoria Rifles Armoury; 691 Cathcart Street	1933 Thomas W. Fuller	Canada's Register of Historic Places; Recognized—1984 Register of the Government of Canada Heritage Buildings	Montreal, Quebec	This Gothic Revival armoury's two-dimensional façade with a low-pitched gable roof is pressed up against its urban streetscape. Houses Le Régiment de Maisonneuve.	
Westmount Armoury; 4625 S^{te}-Catherine Street West	1925 Richard Cotsman Wright	Canada's Register of Historic Places	Montreal, Westmount, Quebec	This two-storey, red brick Châteauesque building in a residential neighbourhood is set in landscaped grounds planted with mature trees. Houses the Royal Montreal Regiment and regimental museum.	
S^{t}-Joseph Boulevard E Armoury; 160 S^{t}-Joseph Boulevard E			Montreal, Quebec		
Manège Henri-Julien; 3721 Henri Julien Street	1911 Raoul Adolphe Brassard	Canada's Register of Historic Places; Recognized—1992 Register of the Government of Canada Heritage Buildings	Montreal, Quebec	Housing Les Fusiliers Mont-Royal, this centrally located Baronial style armoury, which includes a regimental museum, is on a corner site, in a densely packed, mixed neighbourhood.	
Montmagny Armoury; Depot Street	1915 Edgar L. Horwood	Canada's Register of Historic Places; Recognized—1991 Register of the Government of Canada Heritage Buildings	Montmagny, Quebec	Centrally located, mid-size, rectangular Romanesque Revival building with a low-pitched gable roof.	
Colonel D. V. Currie VC Armoury; 1215 Main Street North	1913–1914 David Ewart	1998 Register of the Government of Canada Heritage Buildings	Moose Jaw, Saskatchewan	Large, low-massed Baronial style brick structure is in a mixed commercial, recreational and residential neighbourhood. Currently the home of the Saskatchewan Dragoons; it has housed 95th Saskatchewan Rifles, the 60th Rifles, the King's Own Rifles of Canada, the 77th Battery, Royal Canadian Artillery, the 19th Medical Company, Royal Canadian Army Medical Corps, and the 142nd Transport Company, Royal Canadian Army Service Corps.	
Naden Armoury; CFB Esquimalt	1935–1936 Karl Branwhite Spurgin	Recognized—1991 Register of the Government of Canada Heritage Buildings	Esquimalt, British Columbia (Naden)	Large centrally located Royal Canadian Navy Drill Hall & Administration Building with a low-pitched gable roof (33-33A-33B).	
Napanee Armoury; Centre Street	1914 David Ewart		Napanee, Ontario	Large centrally located Baronial style building with a low-pitched gable roof.	
New Glasgow Armoury; 10 Riverside Street	Built as a commercial property c.1940		New Glasgow, Nova Scotia	This centrally located building has been unoccupied since 2016 following structural inspection and in need of roof repairs. Listed for disposal by Canada Lands, February 2025. Formerly housed a subunit of the Nova Scotia Highlanders.	
The Royal Westminster Regiment Armoury; 530 Queens Ave at 6th Street	1895 Thomas Fuller (architect)	Canada's Register of Historic Places; Recognized—1987 Register of the Government of Canada Heritage Buildings	New Westminster; 49°12′26″N 122°54′44″W	Housing the Royal Westminster Regiment the large, low-massed, rectangular Neo-Gothic style structure on a centrally located sloping site.	
Niagara Falls Armoury; 5049 Victoria Avenue at South Street	1907–1910 David Ewart	Canada's Register of Historic Places	Niagara Falls, Ontario	Centrally located two-storey red brick and stone Baronial style structure with a limestone foundation, featuring a triple Tudorbethan gothic arch and is surrounded by lawn, with flat, open grounds to the rear.	
Oakville Armoury		Canada's Register of Historic Places	Oakville, Ontario	Large centrally located building with a low-pitched gable roof; home of A Company, the Lorne Scots (Peel, Dufferin and Halton Regiment).	
Colonel R. S. McLaughlin Armoury; 53 Simcoe Street North	1914 David Ewart	Recognized—1991 Register of the Government of Canada Heritage Buildings	Oshawa, Ontario	Centrally located, large Baronial style brick structure with a low-pitched gable roof on a compact site. Regimental headquarters of the Ontario Regiment (RCAC) and its affiliated #1913 (Ontario Regiment) Royal Canadian Army Cadet Corps.	
Cartier Square Drill Hall; 2 Queen Elizabeth Drive	1879-80 Thomas Seaton Scott	Classified—1985 Register of the Government of Canada Heritage Buildings	Ottawa, Ontario	Large centrally located Dominion style Gothic Revival building with a low-pitched gable roof houses the Cameron Highlanders of Ottawa (Duke of Edinburgh's Own) and the Governor General's Foot Guards.	
Major E. J. G. Holland VC Armoury; 2100 Walkley Road			Ottawa, Ontario	Houses the 33 Signal Regiment, 33 Combat Engineer Regiment, 33 Service Battalion, and 33 Military Police Platoon.	
Morrison Battery Park; 307 deNiverville Private			Ottawa, Ontario	Located on CFB Uplands in Ottawa, Morrison Battery Park was created during the rebuild of CFRB Dow's Lake following a collapsed roof in the winter of 2009. It is composed of Sprung Shelters and a series of joined office trailers, houses 30th Field Artillery Regiment, and is a training space for other CAF Reserve units and Cadet Corps.	
Tommy Holmes VC Memorial Armoury; 858-10th Street East			Owen Sound, Ontario	Houses "A" Company of the Grey and Simcoe Foresters. Tommy Holmes was Canada's youngest Victoria Cross winner.	
Col Welsford MacDonald Armoury; 31 Union Street (off Dawson Street)			Pictou, Nova Scotia	This centrally located building has a flat roof. Houses the Nova Scotia Highlanders.	
Pembroke Armoury; 177 Victoria Street	1913–1914 David Ewart	Recognized—1992 Register of the Government of Canada Heritage Buildings	Pembroke, Ontario	Large centrally located Baronial style building with a low-pitched gable roof.	
Petawawa Armoury			Petawawa, Ontario	This large centrally located building has a low-pitched gable roof. Houses 1st and 3rd Battalion the Royal Canadian Regiment.	
Peterborough Drill Hall; 220 Murray Street	1907–1908 (completed) David Ewart	1989 National Historic Sites of Canada; 1990 Classified on the Register of the Government of Canada Heritage Buildings	Peterborough, Ontario; 44°18′31.16″N 78°19′20.26″W	Recalling a Baronial style fortress in its turrets, arched troop doors and crenellated roof line, this is one of the largest and best designed examples from this period. It is home to the Hastings and Prince Edward Regiment of the Canadian Armed Forces (Reserve).	A detail of the exterior of the Peterborough armoury
Prince Albert Armoury; 10th Street East at 8th Avenue East	1914 Edgar L. Horwood	Recognized—1988 on the Register of the Government of Canada Heritage Buildings	Prince Albert, Saskatchewan	A large brick Romanesque Revival building with a low-pitched gable roof is centrally located on open terrain adjacent to exhibition grounds.	
Port Arthur Armoury; Park Street at Second Street	1913–1914 David Ewart		Port Arthur, Ontario	A centrally located large brick Baronial style building with a low-pitched gable roof.	
Portage la Prairie Armoury; 143 Second Street	1912–1913 David Ewart	Canada's Register of Historic Places; Recognized—1998 on the Register of the Government of Canada Heritage Buildings	Portage la Prairie, Manitoba	Centrally located in a newer residential area, the two-storey, flat-roofed, red brick Baronial style building has a stone basement and trim.	
Quebec City Armoury; Cove Field, 805 Wilfrid-Laurier Ave	1887 (completed) Eugène-Étienne Taché; 1888 Henry James	1986 National Historic Sites of Canada; Classified—1987 Register of the Government of Canada Heritage Buildings	Quebec City, Quebec; 46°48′22.68″N 71°12′50.4″W	Designed to house Les Voltigeurs de Québec, it was the precursor of the Chateau-style in Canadian architecture; unique among armouries in Canada due to its design, it was heavily damaged by fire in 2008.	Headquarters and Barracks of Les Voltigeurs de Québec, Quebec City Canada. In the foreground is the Regimental War Memorial.
HMCS Montcalm Training Centre; 835 Laurier Avenue East	1938–1939 Charles D. Sutherland	1992 Canada's Register of Historic Places	Quebec City, Quebec	Overlooking the historic battlefield of Quebec, the rectangular 3-storey stone building is in the picturesque Chateau-style and is beside the Quebec Armoury. It originally housed the ammunition inspection service, and then the navy which moved out in 1995. Since then, the building has been used by the Plains of Abraham Museum.	Headquarters and Barracks of Les Voltigeurs de Québec, Quebec City Canada. In the foreground is the Regimental War Memorial.
Red Deer Armoury; Fire Hall #1; 4905 49 Street	1913 Charles Arthur Julian Sharman	Canada's Register of Historic Places	Red Deer, Alberta	A 2 1/2-storey rectangular solid brick building in the Edwardian Baroque Free Style.	
Regina Armoury; 1600 Elphinstone Avenue	1928 Thomas W. Fuller	Recognized—1998 on the Register of the Government of Canada Heritage Buildings	Regina, Saskatchewan	This centrally located Romanesque Revival fortress like building with a low-pitched gable roof is in a modern residential neighbourhood adjacent to the Regina Exhibition Grounds. Organizations that use the armoury include: Regina units of 38 Canadian Brigade Group: 10th Field Regiment, Royal Canadian Artillery, Royal Regina Rifles, 16th (Saskatchewan) Service Battalion, 16th Medical Company, cadet corps and the Military Museum of Saskatchewan.	
Rimouski Armoury; 65 Saint-Jean-Baptiste Street East	1910–1911 David Ewart	Canada's Register of Historic Places; Recognized—1991 Register of the Government of Canada Heritage Buildings	Rimouski, Quebec	This centrally located red brick Baronial style structure's compact, solid volume creates a strong visual presence. Houses Les Fusiliers du S^{t}-Laurent.	
Rivière-du-Loup Armoury; Joly Street	1904 David Ewart	Canada's Register of Historic Places	Rivière-du-Loup, Quebec	Centrally located, symmetrical Baronial style building whose two two-storey wings flank the dominant centre pavilion.	Manège Militaire de Rivière-du-Loup
Rossland Armoury	1904 David Ewart		Rossland, British Columbia	Centrally located, the Baronial style building has a gable roof.	
Rouyn Armoury; Perreault Street E	1935–1936 Thomas W. Fuller	Recognized—1983 Register of the Government of Canada Heritage Buildings	Rouyn, Quebec	Centrally located, symmetrical Baronial style building with a steeply pitched gable roof.	Manège militaire de Rouyn-Noranda
William Street Armoury; 315 William St.	Acquired in 1908 and established as an armory in 1914. Parts of the central structure date from the late 1830s, when it was originally opened as a courthouse in 1841 following plans prepared by William Footner.	Canada's Register of Historic Places; Recognized – 1991 Register of the Government of Canada Heritage Buildings	Sherbrooke, Quebec	Housed The Sherbrooke Hussars and 52nd Field Ambulance until 2021, when the building was ordered evacuated and the units moved to a temporary site at 700 Woodward Street, Sherbrooke. The front facing portion is the former Sherbrooke Court House, convenient to the adjacent former Winter Street Prison. The layout is a central hallway with two former courtrooms behind the front façade, offices beyond, Quartermaster in the basement and a mess on the entire second floor. A large steel gable-roof drill hall is nested behind the offices, and is accessible from a large door on Winter Street. Houses the Sherbrooke Hussars and 51ieme Cie Medicale.	
Belvédère Street Armoury; Belvedere Road South	1907–1908 David Ewart	Canada's Register of Historic Places; Recognized—1991 Register of the Government of Canada Heritage Buildings	Sherbrooke, Quebec	This large centrally located Baronial style building with a low-pitched gable roof, has a large, unobstructed drill hall space. Houses Les Fusiliers de Sherbrooke.	
700 Woodward Street, Sherbrooke, Quebec	Unknown, likely 1960s or 1970s		Sherbrooke, Quebec	The structure is a leased industrial building with a wide front lawn and fenced outdoor parking, housing the Sherbrooke Hussars, les Fusiliers de Sherbrooke, the Sherbrooke-based elements of 35 Signal Regiment, and 52 Field Ambulance.	
LCol Daniel J Murray Armoury; 72 North Street			Springhill, Nova Scotia	This centrally located building has a flat roof. Housing the Nova Scotia Highlanders.	
St. Catharines Armoury; 81 Lake Street at Elizabeth Street	1905 David Ewart	Recognized 1991 Register of the Government of Canada Heritage Buildings	St. Catharines, Ontario	This centrally located large, brick Baronial style structure with a low-pitched gable roof, has a sturdy, military appearance. Houses the Lincoln and Welland Regiment, and 10th Battary, 56th Field Regiment RCA	
Laframboise Street Armoury; 2155 Laframboise Blvd	1905–1906 David Ewart	Canada's Register of Historic Places; Recognized—2005 Register of the Government of Canada Heritage Buildings	Saint-Hyacinthe, Quebec	This centrally located brick and stone Baronial style building is composed of a drill hall, a simple rectangular block with a gable roof, and the north block. Houses 6ieme Battalion of Royal 22^{e} Régiment.	
CWO Couture OMM, CD drill hall building 16	2012		Saint-Jean-sur-Richelieu, Quebec	Houses Royal Military College Saint-Jean.	
Barrack Green Armoury; 60 Broadview Avenue (Carmarthen Street at Broadview Avenue)	1910–1911 David Ewart	Canada's Register of Historic Places; Recognized—1991 Register of the Government of Canada Heritage Buildings	Saint John, New Brunswick	Visible from the town centre, the large, solid, two-storey, rectangular Baronial style building with a low-pitched gable roof is on a hillside within the industrial sector.	
St. Lambert Armoury	1928 Simeon Brais		St. Lambert, Quebec	Formerly housed the Chateauguay Regiment.	
St. Mary's Armouries; 26 Water Street South	1868		St. Marys, Ontario	Centrally located three-storey limestone Tudorbethan building.	
St. Thomas Armoury; Chester and Wilson Streets	1901–1902 David Ewart	Recognized—1992 Register of the Government of Canada Heritage Buildings	St. Thomas, Ontario	This centrally located rectangular, gable-roofed Baronial style building is of solid, compact appearance. Houses 7 Engineer Squadron 31 Combat Engineer Regiment (The Elgins).	
Stratford Armoury; Waterloo Street at Albert Street	1904–1905 Hubert Carroll McBride	Recognized—1992 Register of the Government of Canada Heritage Buildings	Stratford, Ontario	This centrally located fortress-like Romanesque Revival brick building with a low-pitched gable roof features prominent corner towers. Houses 4th Battalion, the Royal Canadian Regiment.	
Strathcona Armoury	1911–1912 David Ewart		Strathcona, Alberta	Centrally located rectangular, gable-roofed Baronial style building of solid, compact appearance.	
Strathroy Armoury; Frank Street at James Street	1907 David Ewart		Strathroy, Ontario	Centrally located rectangular, gable-roofed Baronial style building of solid, compact appearance.	
Summerside Armoury; 33 Summer Street	1910–191911 David Ewart	Canada's Register of Historic Places	Summerside, Prince Edward Island	Centrally located stone and brick Baronial style building replaced an earlier military Drill Shed.	
Sussex Armoury	1902 David Ewart		Sussex, New Brunswick	Centrally located, the Baronial style building has a low-pitched gable roof.	
LCol Clifton Recreation Centre, 350 6th Avenue NE	1954		Swift Current, Saskatchewan	Two-storey building with large enclosed drill hall. Housed 14th Canadian Hussars 1954 to 1968. Operated by the City of Swift Current.	
Thunder Bay Armoury; 317 Park Avenue	1913 David Ewart	Canada's Register of Historic Places	Thunder Bay, Ontario	This two-storey, gable-roofed Baronial style drill hall is centrally located. Houses the Lake Superior Scottish Regiment.	
Toronto Armories; University Avenue at Armoury Street	1891-93 Thomas Fuller (architect) and Henry Langley		Toronto, Ontario	Neo-Gothic style Dominion style building which formerly held 25 Field Ambulance; 48th Highlanders of Canada; 7th Toronto Regiment Royal Canadian Artillery; and the Queen's Own Rifles of Canada. Demolished in 1963.	
Moss Park Armoury; 130 Queen Street East	1965	Canada's Register of Historic Places	Toronto, Ontario	This large centrally located building has a low-pitched gable roof. Houses 25 Field Ambulance, 48th Highlanders of Canada, 7th Toronto Regiment Royal Canadian Artillery, the Queen's Own Rifles of Canada and 32 Canadian Brigade Group Headquarters.	
Fort York Armoury; 660 Fleet Street	1933–1935 Ferdinand Herbert Marani of Marani, Lawson and Morris	1991 Federal Heritage building; on the Register of the Government of Canada Heritage Buildings	Toronto, Ontario	This large, two-storey drill hall with an arched wooden lamella (lattice) roof is home to the Royal Regiment of Canada, Queen's York Rangers (1st American Regiment), 32 Canadian Brigade Group Battle School, and 32 Signal Regiment (formerly 709 (Toronto) Communication Regiment).	
Denison Armoury; 1 Yukon Lane		Canada's Register of Historic Places	Toronto, Ontario	Large centrally located building houses 32 Canadian Brigade Group Headquarters; the Governor General's Horse Guards; 2 Intelligence Company; 32 Combat Engineer Regiment; 32 Service Battalion; 2 Military Police Regiment (Canada) and one of its sub-units, 32 Military Police Platoon; 4th Canadian Division Support Group Signal Squadron (formerly 2 Area Support Group Signal Squadron) Charlie Troop; 4th Canadian Division Support Group Detachment Toronto. Relocated in 2002 from Dufferin and Highway site of original Denison Armoury c 1961.	
Captain B.S. Hutcheson V.C. Armoury; 66 Birmingham Street			Toronto, Ontario	Attached to the Toronto Police College. Houses the Toronto Scottish Regiment.	
Général Jean-Victor Allard Armoury; 574 St. Francois-Xavier Street, corner of Sainte Geneviève	1905–1906 David Ewart	Canada's Register of Historic Places; Recognized—1991 Register of the Government of Canada Heritage Buildings	Trois-Rivières, Quebec	This two-storey, functional red brick Baronial style building with a low-pitched gable roof is in a residential neighbourhood. Houses 12^{e} Régiment blindé du Canada, and their regimental museum.	
Truro Armoury; 126 Willow Street	1874 Thomas Seaton Scott	Canada's Register of Historic Places; Recognized—1991 Register of the Government of Canada Heritage Buildings	Truro, Nova Scotia	This centrally located box-like Dominion style Neo-Gothic style building with a flat roof was designed with classical inspiration. Houses 1st Battalion the Nova Scotia Highlanders.	
Seaforth Armoury; 1650 Burrard Street	1936 (completed) Thomas W. Fuller	Canada's Register of Historic Places; Classified—1997 Register of the Government of Canada Heritage Buildings	Vancouver, British Columbia	Designed by architects McCarter and Nairne, the massive, low-massed, asymmetrical, concrete Romanesque Revival structure with a fortified appearance is a Class A Heritage Building in downtown Vancouver. Houses the Seaforth Highlanders of Canada.	
Lt. Col. James Pemberton Fell (J.P. Fell) Armoury	1914 David Ewart	Recognized—1988 on the Register of the Government of Canada Heritage Buildings	North Vancouver, British Columbia	Large centrally located Baronial style building with a low-pitched gable roof adjacent to a residential area and Mahon Park. The armoury, which houses the 6 Field Engineer Museum, was named for the first Commanding Officer of 6th Field Company.	
Beatty Street Drill Hall; 620 Beatty Street at Dunsmuir Street	1899-1900 David Ewart	Canada's Register of Historic Places; Vancouver landmark and class-A heritage building	Vancouver, British Columbia	Built to house the British Columbia Regiment (Duke of Connaught's Own), this massive, low-massed symmetrically composed Baronial style structure with two large castle-like turrets complete with battlements, whose main entrance is a central troop door.	Beatty Street Drill Hall 1901
Bessborough Armoury; 2025 West 11th Avenue	1932–1933 Thomas W. Fuller	Canada's Register of Historic Places; Vancouver Inventory of heritage buildings "B" Category; Recognized—1997—Register of the Government of Canada Heritage Buildings	Vancouver, British Columbia	Large Romanesque Revival structure with a low-pitched gable roof on a flat site faced by mature trees within an area of containing light industry, and adjacent to a residential area.	
Brigadier Murphy Armoury; 29th & 21st Avenue ASU Chilliwack (Vernon)	1913 David Ewart	Canada's Register of Historic Places; Recognized—1997 Register of the Government of Canada Heritage Buildings	Vernon, British Columbia	Designed from a standard plan, this two-storey Baronial style drill hall has simple horizontal massing and modest but strong detailing.	
Lt. General E. C. Ashton Armoury; 724 Vanalman Avenue	1994		Victoria, British Columbia	Houses 11 Services Company 39 Service Battalion, 11 (Victoria) Field Ambulance, 11 Military Police Platoon, the Lieutenant-General E. C. Ashton Armoury Museum and No. 3005, Royal Canadian Army Cadet Corps.	
Bay Street Drill Hall; 715 Bay Street	1913–1914 William Ridgway Wilson	1989 National Historic Sites of Canada;Recognized—1991 Register of the Government of Canada Heritage Buildings	Victoria, British Columbia; 48°26′6.75″N 123°21′50.16″W	This large fortress-like Baronial style structure of brick, steel and concrete features towers, crenellated turrets, and detailing with Tudorbethan elements. Built during the 1896 to 1918 period when over 100 drill halls and armouries were erected across Canada, its scale reflects the dramatic increase in military participation following Canada's performance during the Second Boer War. Built to house the Fifth Regiment, currently houses the Canadian Scottish Regiment (Princess Mary's).	
Menzies Street Drill Hall	1889 Henry James		Victoria, British Columbia	In addition to the Drill Hall, this complex consisted of Guard House, officers residences, and quartermaster's stores for the Militia Dept.	
Virden Armoury; Bay Street at McBride Street	1913 David Ewart		Virden, Manitoba	This gable-roofed Baronial style drill hall is centrally located.	
Tommy Prince Drill Hall; CFB Wainwright			Wainwright, Alberta	Named in honour of Sergeant Tommy Prince.	
Walkerton Armoury	1907 David Ewart		Walkerton, Ontario	This gable-roofed Baronial style drill hall is centrally located.	
Wellington Armoury; 23 High Street		Canada's Register of Historic Places	Wellington, Ontario	Located at the northeast corner of High and Clyde Streets, abutting the Grand River, in the former Village of Elora.	
Maj FA Tilson VC Armoury (original building); 353 Freedom Way	1899-02 David Ewart	Canada's Register of Historic Places	Windsor, Ontario	A two-storey, red brick Baronial style structure with a three-storey tower, centrally located in the city. It housed the Essex and Kent Scottish until 2004, when a new location was opened on Sandwich St. The building is now owned by the University of Windsor.	
Winnipeg Drill Hall & B8-Drill Hall (Korea Hall); 1984 Grant Avenue; Canadian Forces Base Winnipeg	1941 Charles D. Sutherland	Drill Hall Building 21 Recognized—1997; Drill Hall Korea Hall B8 Recognized—2004 Register of the Government of Canada Heritage Buildings	Winnipeg, Manitoba	Large centrally located wood, metal and brick building with a low-pitched gable roof with a large interior space for the drill hall, and low, shed-roofed 'lean-tos' running along its north and south elevations.	
Minto Armoury; St. Matthew's Avenue at Minto Street	1914–1915 David Ewart	Canada's Register of Historic Places; Recognized—1991 Register of the Government of Canada Heritage Buildings	Winnipeg, Manitoba	Centrally located large, red brick Baronial style structure, exemplified by sturdy, crenellated corner towers and low arched roof.	
Lieutenant-Colonel Harcus Strachan, VC, MC Armoury (formerly McGregor Armoury); 515 Machray Avenue	1914–1915 David Ewart	Canada's Register of Historic Places; Recognized—1994 Register of the Government of Canada Heritage Buildings	Winnipeg, Manitoba	This centrally located drill hall has Baronial style façades; stepped parapet profiles, low arched troop door and corner towers. Houses the Fort Garry Horse, 31 Engineer Squadron, and The Fort Garry Horse Museum and Archives, as well as 3 cadet squadrons.	
Woodstock Armoury; Chapel Street	1904–1905 David Ewart	Canada's Register of Historic Places; Recognized—1991 Register of the Government of Canada Heritage Buildings	Woodstock, New Brunswick	Centrally located, symmetrical Baronial style building with two two-storey wings flanking a central pavilion.	
Yorkton Armoury; 56 1st Avenue (Smith Street at Betts Avenue)	1939 Charles D. Sutherland	Recognized—1998 Register of the Government of Canada Heritage Buildings	Yorkton, Saskatchewan	Centrally located two-storey T-shaped building with a low-pitched gable roof.	
