= 64th Battalion, CEF =

Canadian infantry battalion

The 64th Battalion, CEF was an infantry battalion of the Canadian Expeditionary Force during the Great War. The 64th Battalion was authorized on 20 April 1915 and embarked for Great Britain on 31 March 1916. The battalion provided reinforcements to the Canadian Corps in the field until 7 July 1916 when it ceased to function. On 7 December 1916, it was reorganized, and on 8 January 1917 it absorbed the '37th Overage Battalion, CEF'. The battalion was disbanded on 27 July 1917.

The 64th Battalion recruited in Prince Edward Island, New Brunswick and Nova Scotia and was mobilized at Halifax.

The 64th Battalion was commanded by Lt.-Col. H.M. Campbell from 1 April 1916 to 7 July 1916.

The 64th Battalion was awarded the battle honour THE GREAT WAR 1916–17.

The 64th Battalion, CEF is perpetuated by The Princess Louise Fusiliers.

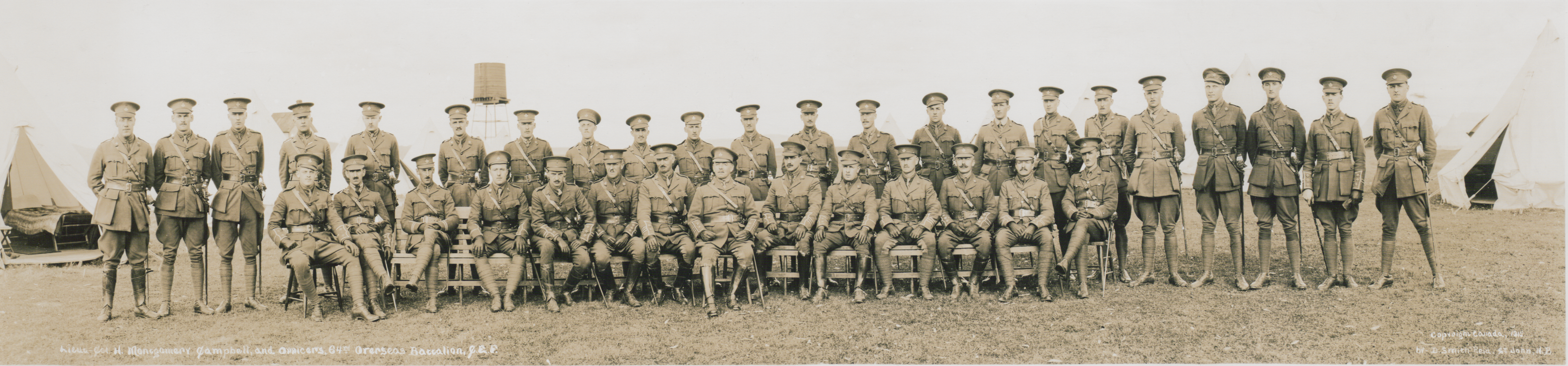

== Sources ==
- Canadian Expeditionary Force 1914-1919 by Col. G.W.L. Nicholson, CD, Queen's Printer, Ottawa, Ontario, 1962
