= Moss Park Armoury =

Armoury of the Canadian Armed Forces in Toronto, Ontario, Canada

Coordinates: 43.654586°N 79.372914°W

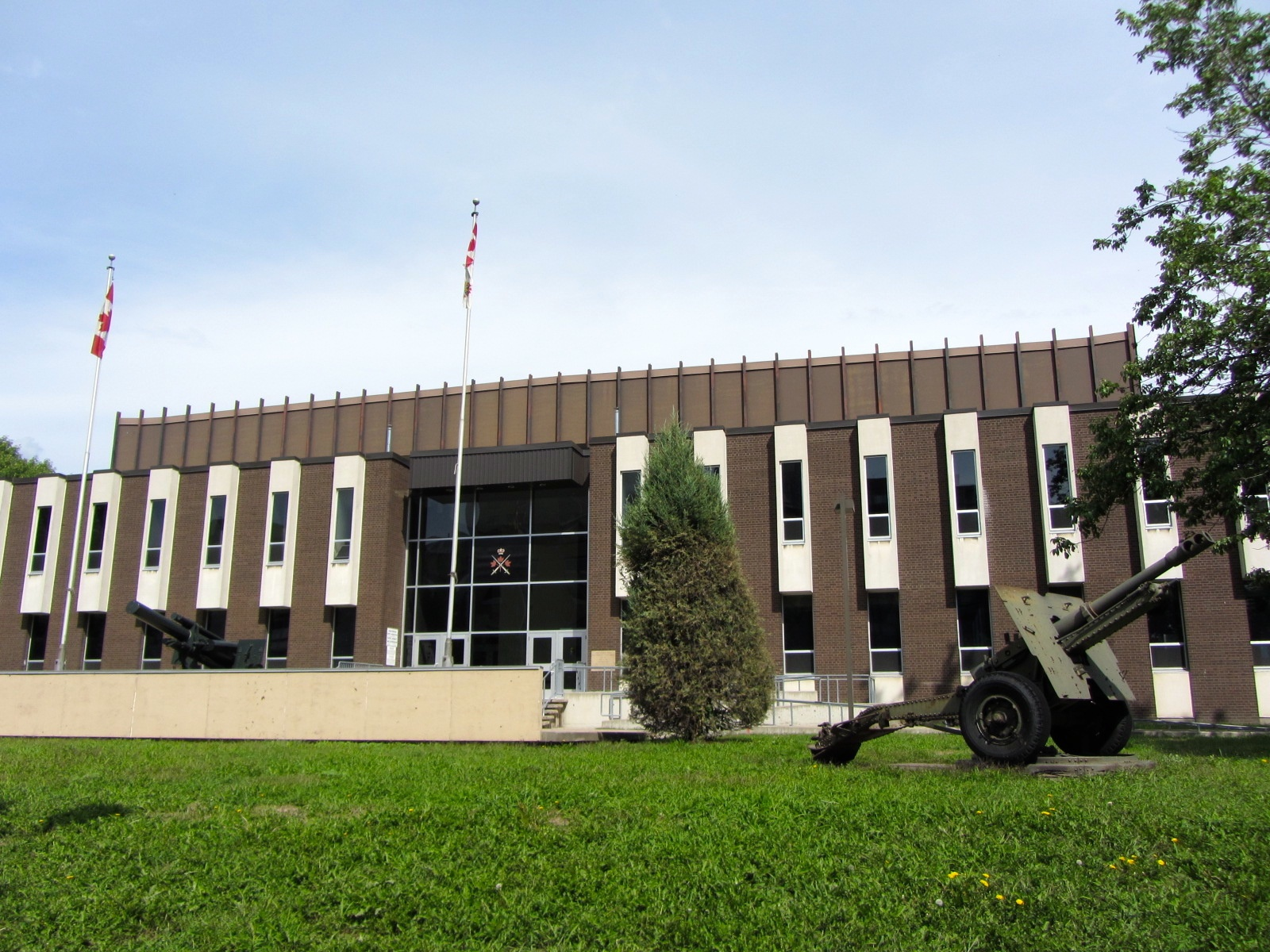

General information
- Type: Drill Hall / armoury
- Location: Toronto, Ontario, Canada, 130 Queen Street East
- Current tenants: 25 Field Ambulance; 48th Highlanders of Canada; 7th Toronto Regiment Royal Canadian Artillery; The Queen's Own Rifles of Canada
- Opened: 1965
- Renovated: 2010
- Owner: Canadian Forces

Moss Park Armoury is a Canadian Forces facility located at 130 Queen Street East in Toronto, Ontario, Canada. It is at the northeast corner of Jarvis Street and Queen Street East, in the neighbourhood of Moss Park. It currently hosts several units of the Primary Reserve. More than 600 soldiers and reservists train at Moss Park every week.

It is located close to the downtown core and financial district, as well as several post-secondary institutions including the University of Toronto, Toronto Metropolitan University, and George Brown College. The Armoury is within a short walking distance of the Queen subway station. It is also accessible by the 501 Queen streetcar route. As a prominent military structure in downtown Toronto, it has been the site of a number of anti-war protests.

Moss Park Armoury was constructed in the mid-1960s to house several of the regiments displaced by the demolition of the old Toronto Armories on University Avenue. It cost CA$2.1 million to construct. In the spring and fall of 2010, the armoury was renovated and the facade was replaced. In 2022 and 2023, an additional floor was added and the ventilation of the Drill Hall was improved.

== Lodger Units ==
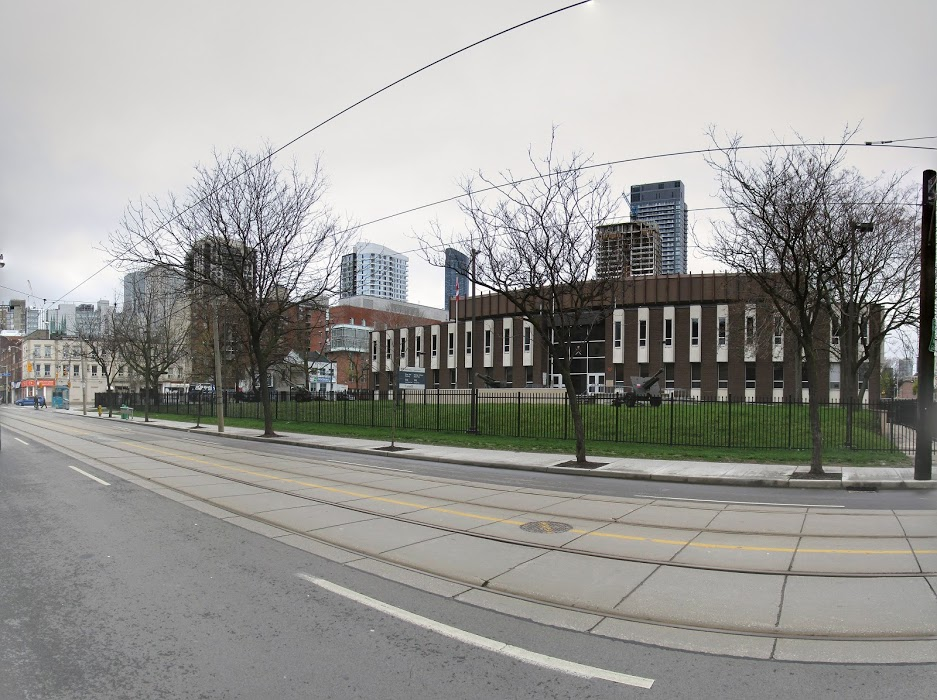
Moss Park Armoury in 2017

In the Canadian Forces, an armoury is a place where a reserve unit trains, meets, and parades. The Armoury is currently home to:

- 25 Field Ambulance
- 48th Highlanders of Canada
- 7th Toronto Regiment Royal Canadian Artillery
- The Queen's Own Rifles of Canada

These units met previously at the Toronto Armories on University Avenue.

The Armoury is also home to the 48th Highlanders of Canada Royal Canadian Army Cadets, a youth program for children aged 12–18.

== Homeless shelter ==
In December 2017, Toronto City Council and Mayor John Tory rejected a motion to consider using armouries located in the city as homeless shelters. However, following several nights of −20 °C (−4 °F) weather, thousands of residents signed petitions asking the Mayor to reconsider the decision. On January 3, 2018, Mayor Tory asked the Government of Canada to allow city staff to use the Moss Park Armoury as a temporary shelter for the homeless. On January 5, 2018, the request was approved by the Government of Canada.

== See also ==
- History of the Canadian Army
- List of armouries in Canada
- Military history of Canada
