= Halifax Armoury =

Coordinates: 44°39′6.4″N 63°35′13.1″W

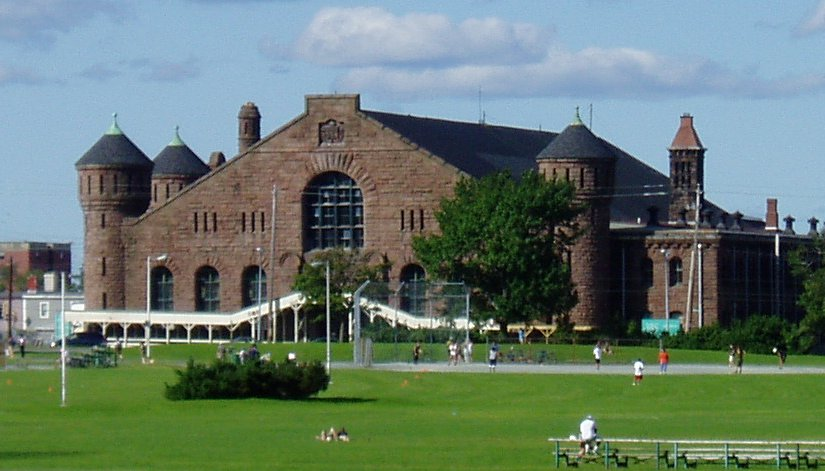
- The Halifax Armoury overlooking Halifax Common
- Interactive map of the Halifax Armoury area

General information
- Type: Drill Hall / armoury
- Architectural style: Romanesque Revival style
- Location: 2667 North Park Street; Halifax, Nova Scotia; B3K 1C6
- Current tenants: The Princess Louise Fusiliers; 2501 Artillery Army Cadets; Halifax Rifles Army Cadets
- Construction started: 1895
- Completed: 1899
- Renovated: 2017 -
- Renovation cost: $131 million (2017)
- Client: Canadian Forces
- Owner: Government of Canada

Technical details
- Structural system: Sandstone structure; Fink Truss Roof
- Floor count: 1

Design and construction
- Architects: Thomas Fuller, Chief Dominion Architect

National Historic Site of Canada
- Official name: Halifax Drill Hall National Historic Site of Canada
- Designated: 1989

The Halifax Armoury is a military structure in central Halifax, Nova Scotia, Canada. The armoury is the home base of The Princess Louise Fusiliers, and several cadet units.

== Architecture ==
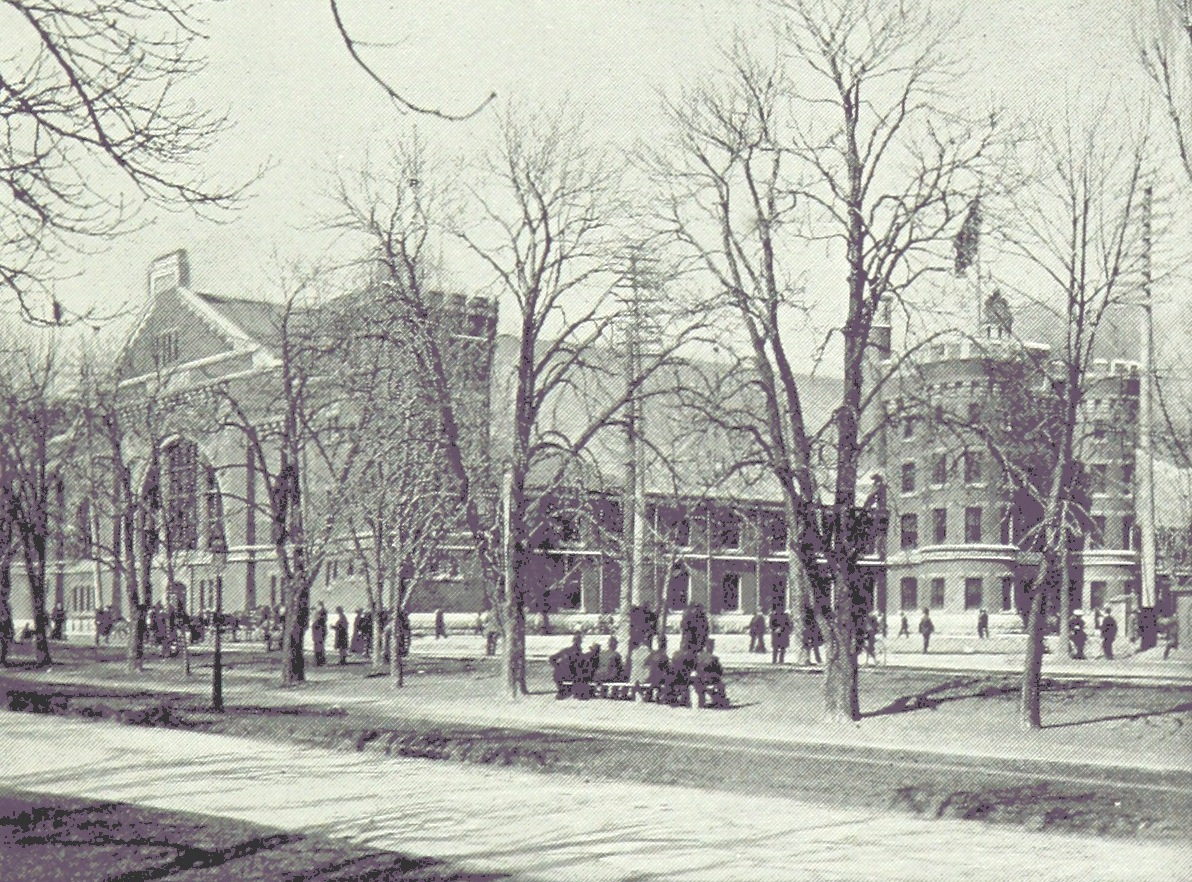
Toronto Armoury, demolished 1963

The armoury was designed in 1895 by Chief Dominion Architect Thomas Fuller. It was opened the next year though work on the structure was not completed until 1899. While the sandstone exterior is based on a medieval castle, it was actually one of the most advanced structures of its day. It was pioneering in its use of a series of Fink trusses to create a large interior space with no columns or walls, and is today the oldest surviving example of such a building. It was also one of the first buildings in Halifax to be lit by electricity. The plan is similar to that of Fuller's Toronto Armoury, completed in 1894.

== History ==
It has played an important part in many wars in which Canada participated, being an important transit point for soldiers before departing by ship for the Boer War and both World Wars. It was damaged in the Halifax Explosion in 1917, the west wall being displaced by about 60 centimetres. Still usable after the explosion, the armoury provided shelter for many who had lost their homes.

The armoury again served as an emergency shelter during the 1945 Bedford Magazine explosions, when thousands of North End residents evacuated toward the Halifax Common. The St. John Ambulance Brigade and the army worked together to shelter the evacuees for about 25 hours following the first explosion.

The building was designated a National Historic Site of Canada in 1989. In 1991, it was designated a Classified Federal Heritage Building.

== Restoration ==
Major renovations were announced in January 2017 to restore the west wall to its original position after being damaged in 1917 by the powerful blast of the Halifax Explosion. Up to 20 per cent of the wall required replacement and it was decided to use stone from the original quarry after the source was located in Beckwith, near Pugwash, Nova Scotia.

=== First phase ===
The first phase of the rehabilitation project centres on restoring the damaged west wall, as a tilt caused by the Halifax Explosion has gradually been increasing. Reconstruction of the wall is expected to be complete in October 2019.

=== Second phase ===
The restoration's second phase is expected to be complete by 2024. The interior will be restored, as will the other three facades as well as the building's roof.

== See also ==
- List of armouries in Canada
- List of oldest buildings and structures in Halifax, Nova Scotia
- Military history of Nova Scotia
