= 92nd Battalion (48th Highlanders), CEF =

Canadian infantry battalion

- Active: 30 July 1915 - 1 September 1917
- Country: Canada
- Branch: Canadian Expeditionary Force
- Role: Infantry
- Size: Battalion

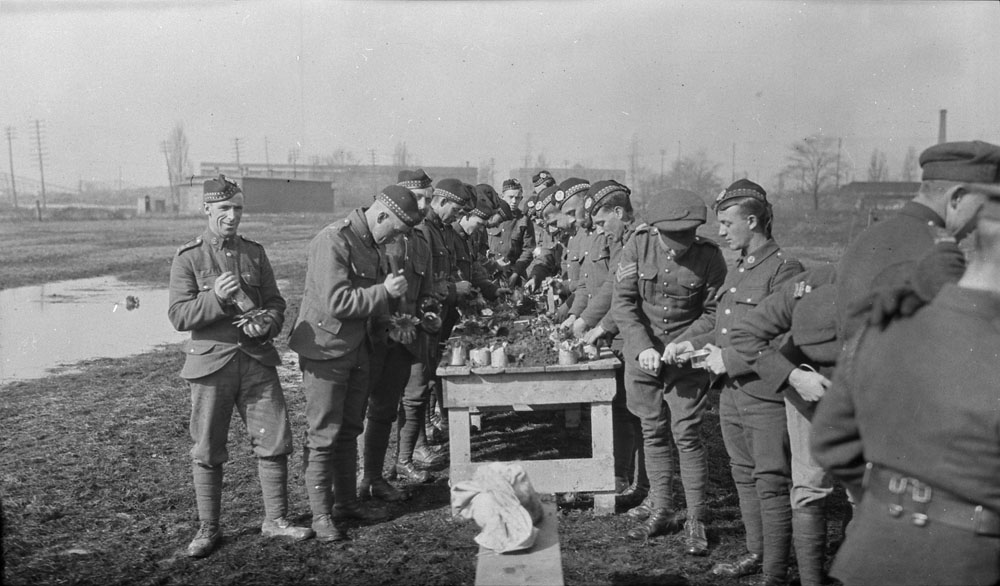
Members of the 92nd Battalion making bombs, Toronto, Ontario

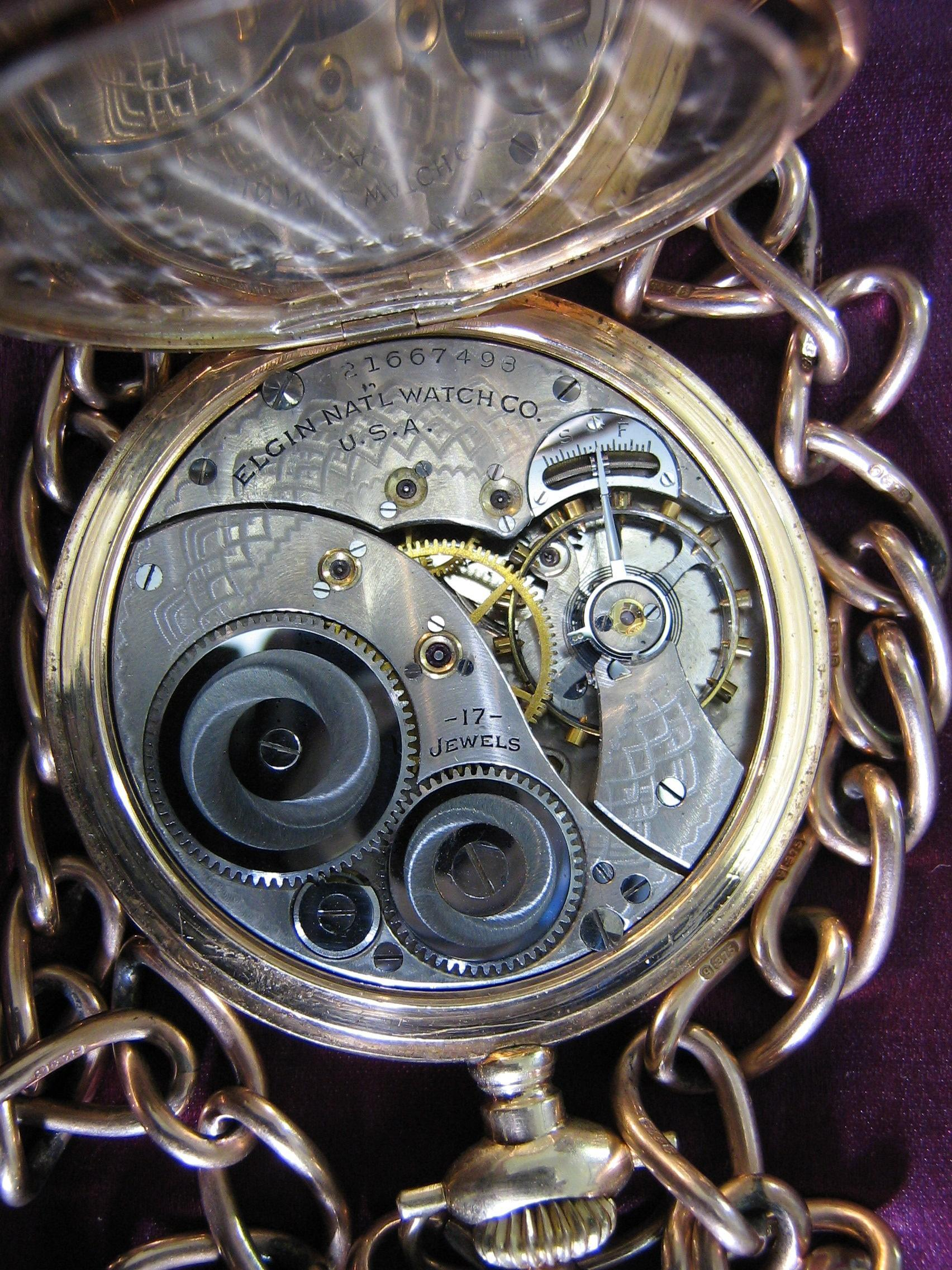
Movement of a gold Elgin pocket watch. cir.1919 - The inscription on the inside back cover: "Presented by Esquesing Township and Citizens of Glen Williams to Private Wilson Heaton - 92 - Battalion - 1919" Private Wilson Heaton enlisted with the 92nd Battalion (48th Highlanders), Canadian Expeditionary Force, and fought in the trenches in World War I in Europe. He returned to work as a stone cutter in the quarries of Glen Williams, Ontario after the war ended.

The 92nd Battalion (48th Highlanders), CEF, was an infantry battalion of the Great War Canadian Expeditionary Force. The 92nd Battalion was authorized on 30 July 1915 and embarked for Britain on 20 May 1916 where the battalion provided reinforcements to the Canadian Corps in the field until 24 January 1917, when its personnel were absorbed by the 5th Reserve Battalion, CEF. The battalion disbanded on 1 September 1917.

The 92nd Battalion recruited in, and was mobilized at, Toronto, Ontario.

The 92nd Battalion was commanded by Lt.-Col. G.T. Chisholm from 20 May 1916 to 4 January 1917.

The 92nd Battalion was awarded the battle honour THE GREAT WAR 1916-17.

The 92nd Battalion (48th Highlanders), CEF is perpetuated by the 48th Highlanders of Canada.

== Sources ==
- Canadian Expeditionary Force 1914–1919 by Col. G. W. L. Nicholson, CD, Queen's Printer, Ottawa, Ontario, 1962
