= Princess Louise Fusiliers =

Infantry regiment of the Canadian Army reserve

The Princess Louise Fusiliers
- Regimental badge
- Active: 1867–present
- Country: Canada
- Branch: Canadian Army
- Type: Line infantry
- Role: Light infantry
- Size: Battalion
- Garrison/HQ: Halifax Armoury
- Motto: Fideliter (Latin for 'faithfully')
- Colours: Green, gold, maroon
- March: "The British Grenadiers"
- Engagements: North-West Rebellion; Second Boer War; First World War; Second World War; War in Afghanistan
- Battle honours: See #Battle honours

Commanders
- Current commander: Lt.-Col. Kevin Stone
- Colonel of the Regiment: Col Douglas Ruck, Honorary Colonel

Insignia
- Hackle: Grey
- Abbreviation: PLF

"The British Grenadiers"
"The British Grenadiers", the authorized quick march of the Princess Louise Fusiliers.

The Princess Louise Fusiliers is a Primary Reserve light infantry regiment of the Canadian Armed Forces. Formed as 66th The Halifax Battalion of Infantry and then named 66th Battalion (Princess Louise Fusiliers) after Princess Louise in 1879, it took its present name in May 1920. The 6th Machine Gun Battalion, CMGC amalgamated with the regiment in 1936

== History ==
=== Early history ===
Based in Halifax, Nova Scotia, this infantry regiment traces its local roots as a Halifax unit of Militia back to June 18, 1749, when Sir Edward Cornwallis formed a local Militia under his own command during Father Le Loutre's War. Ten companies were formed at the Grand Parade in the city and were made a collective battalion.

As an officially constituted unit of Canada, The Princess Louise Fusiliers were authorized on 18 June 1869 as The Halifax Volunteer Battalion of Infantry. During the unit's history, it has undergone several name changes. On November 5, 1869, the regiment was named the 66th The Halifax Battalion of Infantry. Originally consisting of six companies, it later gained two more.

Ten years later, on November 14, 1879, the regiment was once again renamed, this time to the 66th Battalion "Princess Louise" Fusiliers, named for Princess Louise, daughter of Queen Victoria and wife of the Marquess of Lorne, Governor General of Canada at the time. It was shortly after this point in which the regiment received its first battle honour, when they helped suppress the North-West Rebellion of 1885. Soldiers of the unit served in North West Canada with the Halifax Provisional Battalion. Fourteen years later, in 1899, the regiment provided some of its soldiers to a company raised in Nova Scotia for the 2nd (Special Service) Battalion of The Royal Canadian Regiment, which was raised for service in South Africa during the Second Boer War. May 8, 1900 brought about another name change, this time to 66th Regiment "Princess Louise" Fusiliers, and in October 1901 the regiment received new colours from the Duke of Cornwall and York (later King George V) during his visit to Canada. The new colours were subscribed for by the ladies of Halifax in honour of their battalion.

=== First World War ===
During the First World War the 66th Regiment provided soldiers to the locally raised battalions of the Canadian Expeditionary Force (CEF). At the end of the war, as a result of the Otter Commission headed by General William Otter, the regiment perpetuated the 64th Canadian Infantry Battalion of the CEF. As a result of the unit's contributions of soldiers and this perpetuation, the regiment holds five battle honours of the First World War. In May 1915 the regiment was renamed to its current name, the Princess Louise Fusiliers.

=== Second World War ===
The onset of World War II saw more action for the Fusiliers, when they were sent to Italy as part of the 5th Canadian Armoured Division. The regiment fielded two machine gun companies, the 11th Independent MG Company in support of the 11th Canadian Infantry Brigade, and the 12th Independent MG Company in support of the 12th Canadian Infantry Brigade. In British and Commonwealth armoured divisions of that period, independent MG companies consisted of an HQ platoon, plus one platoon operating 0.5 inch (12.7 mm) Browning heavy machine guns and a second platoon operating 4.2-inch heavy mortars; they were heavy direct-fire support units.

In February 1945 the 5th Armoured was transferred from Italy to Belgium, and these two companies participated in the liberation of the Netherlands from late March to the German surrender. During the conflict, the regiment received nine more battle honours, bringing their total count to 16.

=== Post war to the present day ===
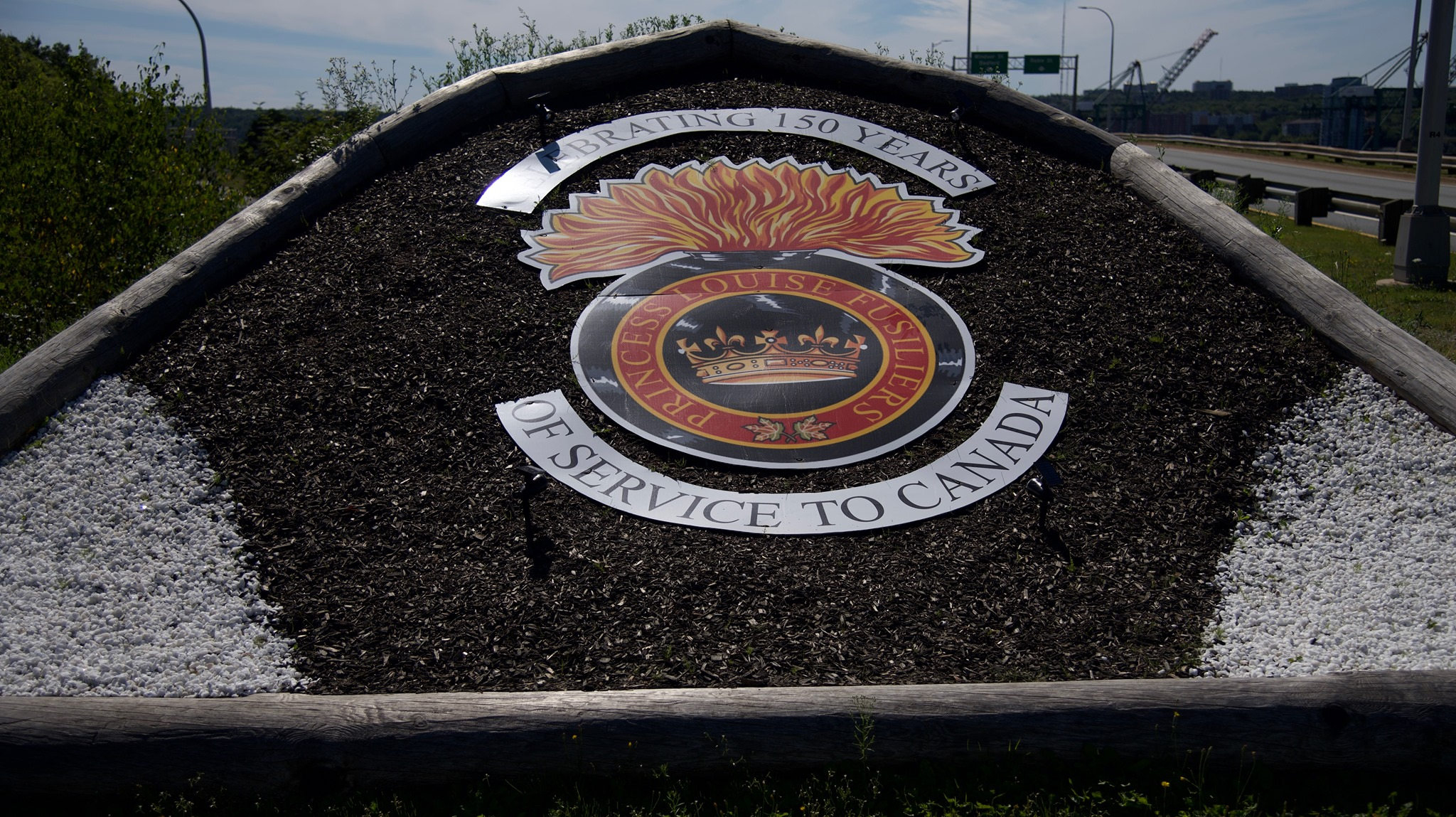
Celebrating 150 years of service. A. Murray MacKay Bridge, Halifax.

Following the Second World War, the PLF converted back to a light infantry unit. Their most recent battle honour, received in 1999 following a lengthy struggle by unit officers to discover the necessary supporting documents, was for the unit's actions at Arnhem in 1945.

In Afghanistan, on Easter Sunday, April 8, 2007, Master Corporal Chris Stannix was killed along with five other Canadian soldiers when their vehicle was hit by an explosive device. Corporal Shaun Fevens was injured in the explosion and transported to a military hospital in Germany.

The PLF performed a ceremonial Trooping the Colour at Citadel Hill in Halifax on 23 April 2009. Inspecting the parade was Prince Andrew, Duke of York, the then-Colonel in Chief of the regiment, with a large crowd in attendance.

On May 14, 2014, a new passenger transit harbour ferry was christened the Christopher Stannix as it was brought into service as part of the Halifax Metro Transit Ferry System. The Christopher Stannix ferry is the first of five new ferries introduced to modernize the current fleet. The ceremony in honour of the naming of the ferry in the memory of Master Corporal Stannix was well attended by the public as well as members of the Stannix family, the commanding officer, regimental sergeant major, and a number of serving and former-serving members of the regiment.

In celebration of the 150th anniversary of the regiment, the city of Halifax installed two special displays in its honour. The first was a recreation of the regiment's flaming grenade cap badge in the form of a floral display, prominently displayed in the Halifax Public Gardens. A second was installed on the Halifax side of the A. Murray MacKay Bridge, this time displaying a large version of the cap badge, framed in a bed of stones and commemorating 150 years of service to Canada.

In June 2019, the regiment celebrated its 150th anniversary with a Freedom of the City parade, with the regiment parading through the city in their distinct scarlet uniforms. Former members of the regiment were also present on parade as a formed contingent of the "Old Guard".

=== Christopher Stannix transit ferry ===
In early 2013 Halifax Transit announced that they would be purchasing what would be the first of five new harbour passenger ferries to augment the now-aging fleet currently in service. The vessel will be built by A. F. Theriault Shipyard, for a cost of $3,987,400. To maintain compatibility with the existing ferry terminal facilities, the new vessel will use the same hull design first used in the Halifax III in 1979. However, updates are planned for many of the ship's systems as well as the interior. The name of the vessel was chosen by the people of Halifax after a competition conducted by Halifax Transit. At the end of the competition over 12,800 votes were cast with the name Christopher Stannix winning 61% of the votes. MCpl Christopher Stannix was a local army reservist with The Princess Louise Fusiliers. He was killed in April 2007 by an improvised explosive device while serving in Afghanistan.

In early June 2014, the winner of the competition to name the new ferry was announced. Retired Corporal Darrel MacDonald, a former member of The Princess Louise Fusiliers and a resident of Halifax Regional Municipality, was the first person to submit the Christopher Stannix name for voting. He was awarded a full-year transit pass and reportedly donated it to the IWK Health Centre (Women and Newborn Health Social Work Department). The passes were converted to sheets of single-use transit tickets and will be passed out at the discretion of the staff within the department.

== Uniform ==
As a fusilier regiment, the PLF wear a hackle. In the case of the PLF it is the grey hackle of the Royal Inniskilling Fusiliers. (Affiliated regiment)

== Battle honours ==
Regimental colour

The Princess Louise Fusiliers have been awarded 17 battle honours since the unit's inception in 1869.

| Battle honour | Conflict | Dates | Emblazoned (Note: indicates that the battle honour has been emblazoned on the Regimental Colour) |
|---|---|---|---|
| NORTH WEST CANADA, 1885 | North-West Rebellion | 1885 | Yes |
| SOUTH AFRICA, 1899–1900 | Second Boer War | 1899–1900 | Yes |
| SOMME, 1916 | World War I | 1 July–18 Nov. 1916 | Yes |
| ARRAS, 1917 | World War I | 9 Apr.–4 May 1917 | Yes |
| Hill 70 | World War I | 15–25 August 1917 | No |
| YPRES, 1917 | World War I | 31 July–10 Nov. 1917 | No |
| AMIENS | World War I | 8–11 August 1918 | Yes |
| LIRI VALLEY | World War II | 18–30 May 1944 | Yes |
| Melfa Crossing | World War II | 24–25 May 1944 | Yes |
| GOTHIC LINE | World War II | 25 Aug.-22 Sept. 1944 | Yes |
| CORIANO | World War II | 3–15 September 1944 | Yes |
| LAMONE CROSSING | World War II | 2–13 December 1944 | Yes |
| Misano Ridge | World War II | 3–5 Sept. 1944 | Yes |
| ITALY, 1944–1945 | World War II | 1944–1945 | Yes |
| Arnhem, 1945 | World War II | 12–14 Apr. 1945 | Approved |
| Delfzijl Pocket | World War II | 23 Apr.–2 May 1945 | Yes |
| NORTH-WEST EUROPE, 1945 | World War II | 1945 | Yes |
| AFGHANISTAN | South-West Asia | 2002–2014 | Approved |

On May 9, 2014 it was announced that the Princess Louise Fusiliers would be among the units to be awarded the “Afghanistan” theatre honour to recognize the dedication and sacrifice made by members of the unit who took part in Canada's operations in Afghanistan, the longest armed conflict in Canadian history.

Theatre honours are a type of battle honour given to publicly recognize a Canadian Armed Forces unit for participation in a theatre of armed conflict. Such honours have been awarded after every major conflict in which Canada has been engaged.

== Lineage ==
Regimental colour

Camp flag

=== The Princess Louise Fusiliers ===
- Originated on 18 June 1869, in Halifax, Nova Scotia, as The Halifax Volunteer Battalion of Infantry.
- Redesignated on 5 November 1869, as the 66th The Halifax Volunteer Battalion of Infantry.
- Redesignated on 14 November 1879, as the 66th Battalion (Princess Louise Fusiliers).
- Redesignated on 8 May 1900, as the 66th Regiment (Princess Louise Fusiliers).
- Redesignated on 15 May 1920, as The Princess Louise Fusiliers.
- Amalgamated on 1 December 1936, with the Headquarters and A Company of the 6th Machine Gun Battalion, CMGC, and redesignated as The Princess Louise Fusiliers (Machine Gun).
- Redesignated on 1 January 1941, as the 2nd (Reserve) Battalion, The Princess Louise Fusiliers (Machine Gun).
- Redesignated on 15 February 1946, as The Princess Louise Fusiliers (Machine Gun).
- Redesignated on 11 April 1958, as The Princess Louise Fusiliers.
- Redesignated on 14 May 1985, as The Princess Louise's Fusiliers.
- Redesignated on 5 January 2009, as The Princess Louise Fusiliers.

=== 6th Machine Gun Battalion, CMGC ===
- Originated on 1 June 1919, in Halifax, Nova Scotia, as the 6th Machine Gun Brigade, CMGC.
- Redesignated on 15 September 1924, as the 6th Machine Gun Battalion, CMGC.
- Amalgamated on 1 December 1936, with The Princess Louise Fusiliers and redesignated as The Princess Louise Fusiliers (Machine Gun).

=== Lineage chart ===
Lineage chart

1869 | The Halifax Volunteer Bn of Infy
1869 | 66th The Halifax Volunteer Bn of Infy
1879 | 66th Bn, "Princess Louise Fusiliers"
1885 | Active service (Note: Three companies, April–July)
1900 | 66th Regt "Princess Louise Fusiliers"
1915 | 64th "Overseas" Bn, CEF
1917 | Disbanded
1919 | 6th MG Bde, CMGC
1920 | 1st Bn (64th Bn, CEF), The Princess Louise Fusiliers | 2nd Bn, (Note: Reserve) The Princess Louise Fusiliers
1924 | 6th MG Bn, CMGC
1936 | Disbanded
1936 | The Princess Louise Fusiliers (MG)
1941 | 1st Bn, The Princess Louise Fusiliers (MG), CASF | 2nd (Reserve) Bn, The Princess Louise Fusiliers (MG)
1942 | The Princess Louise Fusiliers (Motor), CASF
1943 | 1st Bn, The Princess Louise Fusiliers, CIC, CASF
1943 | 11th Infy Bde Support Group (The Princess Louise Fusiliers), CIC, CASF
1944 | 11th Independent MG Coy (The Princess Louise Fusiliers), CASF | 12th Independent MG Coy (The Princess Louise Fusiliers), CIC, CASF
1945 | Disbanded
1946 | Disbanded | The Princess Louise Fusiliers (MG)
1958 | The Princess Louise Fusiliers
1985 | The Princess Louise's Fusiliers
2009 | The Princess Louise Fusiliers

== Perpetuations ==
- 64th Battalion, CEF

== Armoury ==
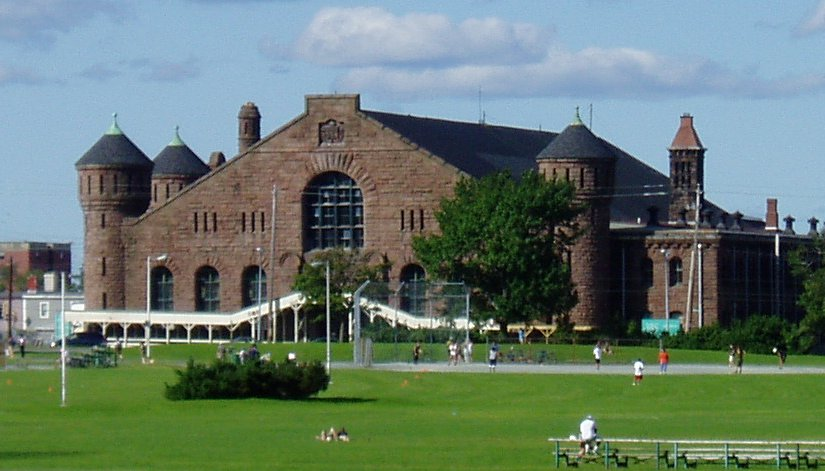
Halifax Armoury

The regiment's armoury is the Halifax Armoury 2667 North Park Street, North Central Halifax Regional Municipality which is a Romanesque Revival drill hall, built for the active militia, of red rough faced brick.

== Alliances ==
- United Kingdom - The Royal Irish Regiment (27th (Inniskilling), 83rd, 87th and Ulster Defence Regiment)

== Media ==
- From Farm Boy to Soldier: Experiences of a World War II Vetern Princess Louise Fusiliers by Gordon P. Hogan (2005)
- Fideliter: The Regimental History of the Princess Louise Fusiliers by Leo J. Deveaux (2020)

== See also ==
- The Canadian Crown and the Canadian Forces
- Military history of Nova Scotia
- List of armouries in Canada
- Military history of Canada
- History of the Canadian Army
- Canadian Forces
- Halifax–Dartmouth Ferry Service

== Notes ==
| Preceded by Les Fusiliers Mont-Royal | The Princess Louise Fusiliers | Succeeded by The Royal New Brunswick Regiment (Carleton & York) |
