= 7th Toronto Regiment, RCA =

Coordinates: 43.654586°N 79.372914°W

7th Toronto Regiment, Royal Canadian Artillery
- Active: April 1, 1965–Present, (9 Battery; 9 March 1866–Present)
- Country: Canada
- Branch: Canadian Army
- Type: Field Artillery
- Size: Three Batteries
- Part of: 32 Canadian Brigade Group; 2nd Canadian Division
- Garrison/HQ: Moss Park Armoury, Toronto, Ontario
- Nicknames: 7 Tor, The Seven Guns, The Black Hand
- Mottos: Ubique (Everywhere), Quo Fas et Gloria Ducunt (Whither Right and Glory Lead)
- Colors: Blue and Red
- March: British Grenadiers, Voice of the Guns

Commanders
- Key Appointments: CO: LCol Dean CD; 2IC: Maj Roach; Adjt: Capt Morningstar; RSM: MWO Lombara

The 7th Toronto Regiment, Royal Canadian Artillery is a Primary Reserve regiment, part of 2nd Canadian Division's 32 Canadian Brigade Group.

The regiment was formed in 1965 when all the gunner units within the Toronto garrison (29th Field Regiment, 42nd Medium Regiment and 1st Locating Regiment) were merged. The regiment is proud to be the only Royal Regiment of Canadian Artillery in Canada to include the name of its home city in its title. The City of Toronto has recognized this distinction by granting the Freedom of the City to the regiment in May 1966.

As with all regiments with the Royal Regiment of Canadian Artillery it has two mottos: Ubique ("Everywhere") and Quo Fas Et Gloria Ducunt ("Whither Right and Glory Lead"). These mottos replaced individual battle honours carried by artillery units until 1832. Ubique denotes the active service of the regiment everywhere in the world and the major part played by the artillery regiment in all battles. It takes the place of all past or future battle honours and distinctions gained in the field.

There are three batteries within the regiment, 9 battery – the howitzer or gun battery, 15 battery – the Light Urban Search and Rescue battery (LUSAR), and 130 battery – the headquarters battery as well as training and recruiting. Currently all three batteries parade at Moss Park Armoury.

The regiment currently operates the 105mm C3 Howitzer along with the 81mm Mortar. As well as 105mm C1 Howitzers for ceremonial salutes such as the one fired in Queen's Park on Remembrance Day. Gun crews are also trained in the C6, C7, C9A1, M72 and 84mm Carl Gustav.

The regiment has sent its volunteer citizen soldiers to serve with NATO forces in Germany as part of 1st Regiment, Royal Canadian Horse Artillery and to United Nations peacekeeping efforts in Cyprus and the NATO Stabilization Force in Bosnia. Gunners have deployed on three civil emergency operations: to Manitoba to stem the Red River flooding, to Eastern Ontario to help communities recover from the devastating ice storm of 1998 and on OP LASER a response to the global COVID-19 pandemic. Other members of the regiment have most recently served with the International Security Assistance Force in Afghanistan.

== History ==
The history of artillery units in Canada begins with the professional batteries of New France, whose ability to move ordnance great distances through the wilderness impressed Montcalm. Canadian gunners served with the British Army during the American War of Independence and again in the War of 1812.

=== Before and after Confederation ===
The 7th Toronto Regiment, RCA traces its historical roots to the Volunteer Incorporated Artillery Company formed in 1813 under the command of Captain Alexander Cameron. On December 5, 1837, under the command of Major T. Carfrae the 1st Toronto Artillery Company, as the Volunteer Incorporated Artillery Company had become, put an end to the Mackenzie Rebellion by firing upon Montgomery's Tavern. Following the 1855 Militia Act the company was redesignated The Toronto Field battery, which in turn became No. 9 "Toronto" Field battery in 1894 and the 9th "Toronto" Field battery in 1895. On July 1, 1889, the 9th "Toronto" Field battery CA, along with the 4th "St. Catharines" Field battery CA and the 7th "Hamilton" battery CA formed the 2nd Bde Div of Field Artillery, Canadian Artillery.

=== World War I ===
In World War I, 9th battery equipped with 18 pdrs fought as part of 3rd Fd Bde, 1st Cdn Div until 1917, when it was transferred to the 3rd Fd Bde, 4th Cdn Div for the remainder of the war with 4.5 in. howitzers. 15th, 30th, and 53rd batteries were formed in 1916, all with 18 pdrs. The 15th were assigned to 4th Fd Bde, 2nd Div, the 30th went to 6th Fd Bde, 3rd Div, while the 53rd went to 13th Fd Bde, 5th Div. Thus the Toronto gunners were represented in all World War I Canadian divisions. In addition, the 1st Siege battery equipped with 9.2 in. howitzers fought with 1st Bde, Cdn Garrison Artillery, Cdn Corps Heavy Artillery.

=== Interwar period ===
A formation was authorized on March 15, 1931, as the '7th Toronto Regiment, CA'. It was redesignated: '7th (Toronto) Regiment, CA' on October 1, 1933; '7th (Toronto) Regiment, RCA' on June 3, 1935; '7th (Reserve) (Toronto) Regiment, RCA' on November 7, 1940; and '7th (Reserve) (Toronto) Group, RCA (CA)' on October 1, 1942; converted and redesignated 'Royal Canadian Artillery, 2nd Division' on April 1, 1946; and 'Royal Canadian Artillery, 2nd Armoured Division' on June 19, 1947. The formation was disbanded on October 1, 1954.

=== World War II ===
In World War II, 9 battery fired both 25 pdrs and 105mm SP, with 3rd Field Bde, 11th Army Field Regt, 1st Canadian Corps Artillery, both in Italy, where at one time they were part of the 8th Army, the "Desert Rats", and later in Northwest Europe as part of the 1st Canadian Army Artillery. 15 battery became part of the 7th Anti-Tank Regt and saw action with 2, 6, and 17 pdrs and the M-10 SP 3 in. 23 battery served with both 1st and 5th Med Regts firing 6in. how. And 5.5 gun while 25 battery with similar weapons served with 18th Fd Regt and 2nd Med Regt, 1st AGRA. Both 30 and 53 batteries became LAA batteries with 40mm Bofors, one with 6 LAA Regt, 2nd Corps Artillery and the other with 4th Fd Regt, 3rd LAA Regt, 2 Div and 11th LAA Regt.

Throughout World War II a reserve regiment was maintained in Toronto to recruit and train replacements for the batteries overseas.

=== Post World War II-1965 ===
Following the end of World War II, Headquarters RCA, 2nd Div was set up in Toronto with 29th Fd Regt, 32nd Fd Regt, 42nd Med Regt, 49th HAA Regt, and 69th Survey Regt all located within Toronto. In 1947 reorganization saw the loss of the 49th HAA, the 69th became an Observation Regt while the designation SP was added to the 29th and 32nd Regts. In 1950 the 1st Anti-Aircraft Gun Operations Room was established. The next reorganization in 1954 saw the loss of the 32nd Fd and the 1st AAOR. The 69th became the 1st Locating Regt with 134 Svy & Rad battery and 208 Loc battery.

In May 1951, the 27th Canadian Infantry Brigade Group was raised to become Canada's contribution to the NATO forces stationed in Europe. As part of that the 209th Fd battery was formed from members of 9 battery and conducting its initial training in Toronto before joining the 79th Fd Regt, which sailed along with rest of the Bde to Germany in December of that year. Subsequently, the 79th Fd Regt was renamed the 3rd Regt RCHA and 209th battery became G battery. 3 RCHA served in Korea from May to November 1954.

The 7th Toronto Regiment RCA made its reappearance in 1965 when, as a result of the Suttie Commission the 29th Fd, 42nd Med and the 1st Loc Regts were transferred to the supplementary Order of Battle. 9th, 15th and 130th batteries from 29th Field Regiment were transferred to 7th Toronto Regiment, which moved into its present location in Moss Park Armoury following the demise of the University Avenue Armoury.

7th Toronto is currently the only Canadian Forces artillery Reserve regiment to maintain a howitzer battery alongside a dedicated dismounted mortar battery (the latter having the unofficial cognomen of "Lightfighter battery"). The third battery, 130, is a training battery, largely for troops who are as-yet unqualified to take positions related to their trade within the regiment.

The 7th Toronto Regiment is affiliated to the 105 Royal Canadian Army Cadet Corps based in Streetsville.

=== War in Afghanistan and other operational deployments ===
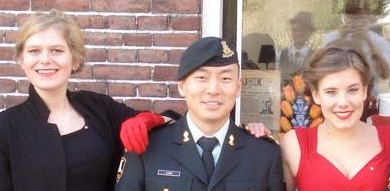
Lieutenant Lum representing the regiment during a goodwill visit to the Netherlands in March 2015.

Members of the regiment volunteered for service in Afghanistan throughout the entirety of the conflict. Utilized as gun-crew, recce/CP/OP technicians, or command staff, the regiment consistently demonstrated the eagerness of its members to be deployed in operational roles as often as they could alongside their regular-force counterparts.

7th Toronto Regiment was also able to send personnel to assist in humanitarian efforts in both the Philippines and Nepal during recent crises in those area.

In addition to overseas deployments, the regiment has contributed proportionately large numbers of personnel to domestic operations. The most recent of these has been Op CADENCE in 2010 as part of the G8 and G20 Summits in Toronto, and Op PROVISION in accordance with the Canadian government's accommodation of Syrian refugees. As well as members sent on Op LASER, a response to the COVID-19 pandemic.

== Order of precedence ==
Preceded by 6th Field Artillery Regiment, RCA	7th Toronto Regiment, RCA	Succeeded by 10th Field Artillery Regiment, RCA of Royal Canadian Artillery

== See also ==
- History of the Canadian Army
- Canadian Forces Land Force Command
- Royal Regiment of Canadian Artillery
- Conn Smythe
