= 25 Field Ambulance =

Coordinates: 43.654586°N 79.372914°W

25 (Toronto) Field Ambulance
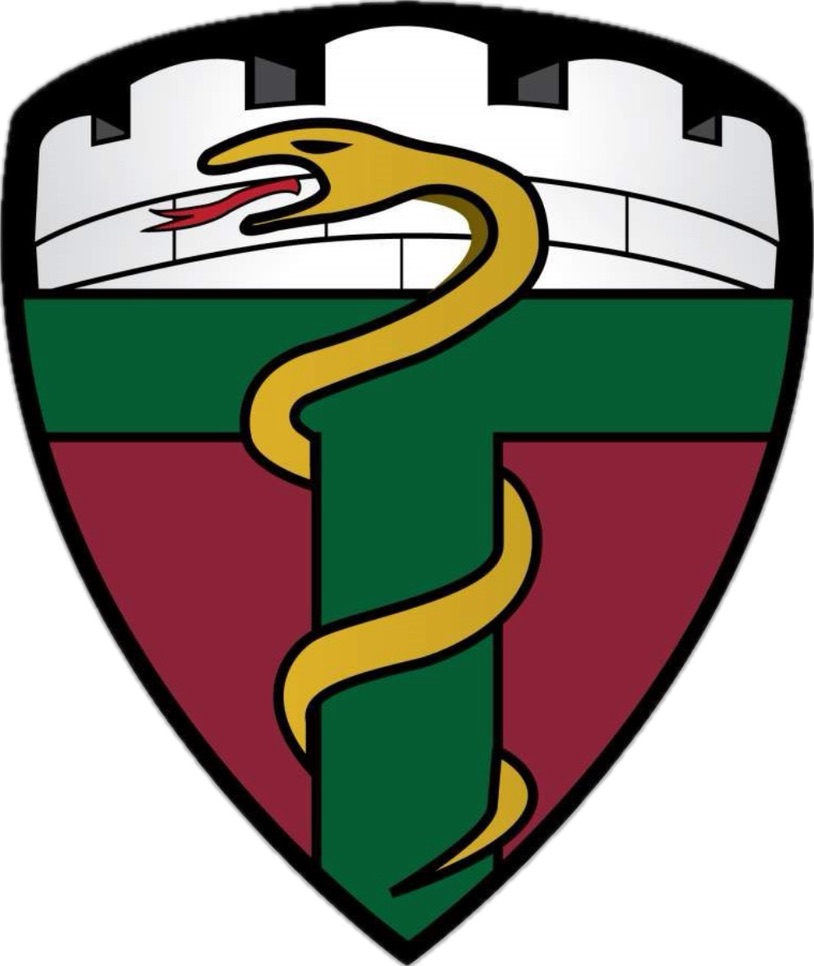
- 25 (Toronto) Field Ambulance Unit Insignia 25 (Toronto) Field Ambulance Unit Insignia
- Active: 1977–present
- Country: Canada
- Branch: Royal Canadian Medical Service
- Role: Medical
- Size: Company
- Part of: Canadian Forces Health Services Group
- Garrison/HQ: Moss Park Armoury
- Nickname: 25 Fd Amb
- Mottos: Militi Succurrimus ("We Hasten to Aid the Soldier")
- March: Music: "Farmer's Boy"

Commanders
- Honorary Colonel: HCol Dr. Michael Dan, MD, PhD, MBA, CM, OOnt
- Commanding Officer: LCol Deep S. Bains, CD
- Regimental Sergeant Major: CWO Chris Thomas, CD
- Colonel-in-chief: Anne, Princess Royal

25 (Toronto) Field Ambulance (25 Fd Amb), formerly 25 (Toronto) Medical Company, is a Canadian Forces Primary Reserve (militia) medical unit in Toronto, Ontario. The company-strength formation is part of 4 Health Services Group, which is headquartered in Montreal, Quebec.

It is the only Primary Reserve medical unit in Toronto. The unit parades out of Moss Park Armoury and is tasked with providing medical support to 32 Canadian Brigade Group. Members of the unit have served on various UN and NATO missions around the world, including Cyprus, Bosnia and the former Yugoslavia, Haiti, the Sudan and for the Canadian component of the International Security Assistance Force in Afghanistan.

== External ==
- CFMS History/Heritage Page
- Canadian Forces Medical Service : Introduction to its History and Heritage
- Canadian War Museum
