= 48th Highlanders of Canada =

Canadian military unit

Coordinates: 43.654586°N 79.372914°W

The 48th Highlanders of Canada
- Regimental badge
- Active: 16 October 1891 – present
- Country: Canada
- Branch: Canadian Army
- Type: Infantry
- Role: Light infantry
- Size: 1 battalion
- Part of: 32 Canadian Brigade Group
- Garrison/HQ: Moss Park Armoury, Toronto, Ontario
- Nicknames: The Glamour Boys; The Dirty Four Dozen; The Red Watch; The Famous 48th
- Motto: Dileas gu brath (Scottish Gaelic for 'faithful forever')
- March: Quick March: "Highland Laddie"; Slow March: "48th Highlanders Slow March"; Commanding Officer's March: "LCol Robertson VD"; Advance in Review Order: "Scotland the Brave"; March On/Off the Colours: "The Maple Leaf Forever"
- Engagements: Second Boer War; First World War; Second World War; War in Afghanistan
- Battle honours: See #Battle honours
- Website: army-armee.forces.gc.ca/en/48-highlanders/index.page

Commanders
- Current commander: LCol T.D. Wentzell.
- Honorary colonel: HCol S. Darling
- Regimental sergeant major: CWO M.G. French
- Notable commanders: 15th Bn CEF: Lt Col CE Bent.; 1st Bn 48 Highrs: Brig IS Johnston; Lt Col D MacKenzie

Insignia
- NATO Map Symbol

The 48th Highlanders of Canada is a Canadian Forces Primary Reserve infantry regiment based in Toronto, Ontario, parading out of Moss Park Armoury. The regiment is part of 4th Canadian Division's 32 Canadian Brigade Group.

The regiment was formed in 1891, and a battalion using the 48th's badges and tartan fought in France and Flanders in the First World War. The regiment fielded an overseas battalion for the Second World War that fought in Sicily, Italy and northwestern Europe.

== Regimental Badge ==
=== Description ===
On a torteau the number 48 Argent above a scroll Azure edged and inscribed "Highlanders" in capital letters Argent, all encircled by a belt Azure edged buckled and inscribed "dileas gu brath" in capital letters Argent, overall in chief on a wreath Argent and Gules a falcon's head couped Argent.

=== Symbolism ===
The falcon's head is adopted from the crest of the Clan Davidson, the regiment's first commanding officer being Lieutenant-Colonel John Irvine Davidson, and the predominant colours of red and blue are from the Davidson tartan that the regiment wears. The number "48" and the word "Highlanders" are a form of the regimental title and "dileas gu brath" is the motto of the regiment.

== Lineage ==
Regimental colour

Camp flag

=== 48th Highlanders of Canada ===
- Originated on 16 October 1891, in Toronto, Ontario, as the 48th Battalion Highlanders
- Redesignated on 8 May 1900, as the 48th Regiment Highlanders
- Redesignated on 15 May 1920, as The 48th Regiment (Highlanders)
- Redesignated on 1 August 1930, as the 48th Highlanders of Canada
- Redesignated on 7 November 1940, as the 2nd (Reserve) Battalion, 48th Highlanders of Canada
- Redesignated on 31 December 1945, as the 48th Highlanders of Canada

=== Lineage chart ===
Lineage chart

1891	48th Bn "Highlanders"
1900	48th Regt "Highlanders"
1914	15th Bn, CEF
1915	92nd "Overseas" Bn, CEF	134th "Overseas" Bn, CEF
1917	Absorbed by 5th Reserve Bn
1918	Absorbed by 12th Reserve Bn
1920	Disbanded	1st Bn (15th Bn, CEF), The 48th Regt (Highlanders)	2nd Bn (92nd Bn, CEF), (Note: Reserve) The 48th Regt (Highlanders)	3rd Bn (134th Bn, CEF), The 48th Regt (Highlanders)
1930	1st Bn (15th Bn, CEF), 48th Highlanders of Canada	2nd Bn (92nd Bn, CEF), 48th Highlanders of Canada	3rd Bn (134th Bn, CEF), 48th Highlanders of Canada
1936	48th Highlanders of Canada	Disbanded	Disbanded
1939	48th Highlanders of Canada, CASF
1940	1st Bn, 48th Highlanders of Canada, CASF	2nd (Reserve) Bn, 48th Highlanders of Canada
1945	3rd Canadian Infy Bn (48th Highlanders of Canada), CASF
1945	Disbanded	Disbanded	48th Highlanders of Canada
1951	"E" Coy, (Note: Regular Force) 48th Highlanders of Canada	"F" Coy, 48th Highlanders of Canada
1951	Absorbed by 1st Canadian Highland Bn
1952	Absorbed by 2nd Canadian Highland Bn

== Perpetuations ==
The 48th Highlanders of Canada perpetuate the 15th Battalion (48th Highlanders of Canada), CEF, the 92nd Battalion (48th Highlanders), CEF, and the 134th Battalion (48th Highlanders), CEF.

== Operational history ==
=== South African War ===
The 48 Highlanders contributed individual volunteers for the Canadian contingents to South Africa, mainly the 2nd (Special Service) Battalion, Royal Canadian Regiment of Infantry.

=== First World War ===
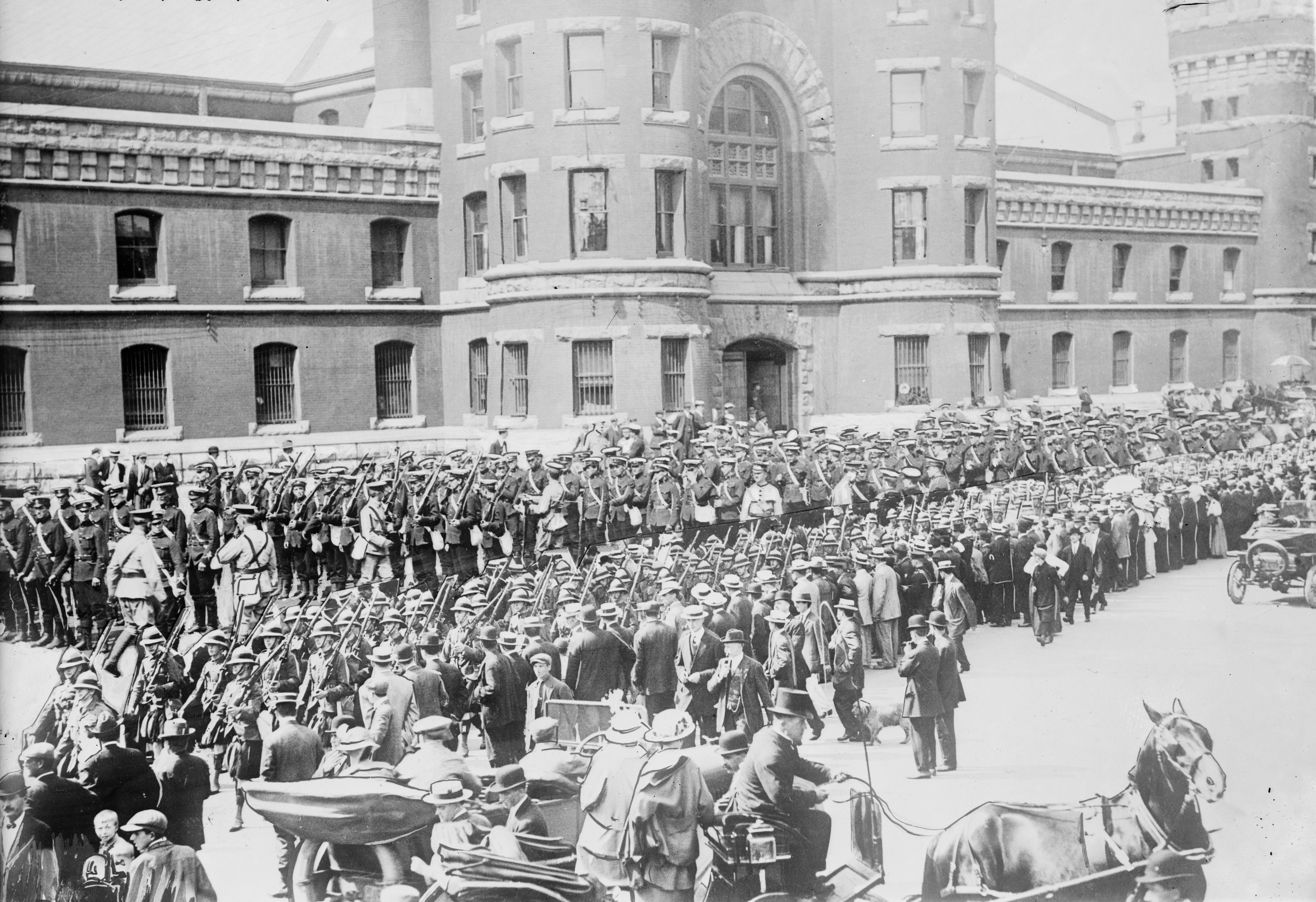
48th Highlanders of Canada, 12th York Rangers, and 10th Royal Grenadiers leave Toronto 1914

During World War I, the 15th Battalion, CEF, was authorized on 1 September 1914 and embarked for Britain on 26 September 1914 and arrived in France on 15 February 1915. The battalion fought as part of the 3rd Infantry Brigade, 1st Canadian Division in France and Flanders throughout the war. The 15th Battalion was disbanded on 30 August 1920.

The 92nd Battalion (48th Highlanders), CEF was authorized on 30 July 1915 and embarked for Britain on 20 May 1916, where the battalion provided reinforcements to the Canadian Corps in the field until 24 January 1917, when its personnel were absorbed by the 5th Reserve Battalion, CEF before being disbanded on 1 September 1917.

The 134th Battalion was authorized on 22 December 1915 and embarked for Britain on 8 August 1916, where it provided reinforcements to the Canadian Corps in the field until 7 March 1918, when its personnel were absorbed by the 12th Reserve Battalion, CEF. The battalion was then disbanded on 29 November 1918.

=== Second World War ===
During World War II, the regiment mobilized the 48th Highlanders of Canada, CASF, on 1 September 1939. It was subsequently redesignated the 1st Battalion, 48th Highlanders of Canada, CASF, on 7 November 1940. It departed Canada for Britain on 16 December 1939, and on 13 June 1940, it went to France as part of the abortive Second British Expeditionary Force. The battalion reached Sablé-sur-Sarthe before being ordered back to Britain. It landed in Sicily on 10 July 1943 and in Italy on 3 September 1943 as part of the 1st Canadian Infantry Brigade, 1st Canadian Infantry Division. In March 1945, the regiment moved with the remainder of the I Canadian Corps to North-West Europe, where it fought until the end of the war. The overseas battalion was disbanded on 31 December 1945.

On 1 June 1945, a second battalion of the regiment was mobilized for service in the Pacific theatre of operations, designated as the 3rd Canadian Infantry Battalion (48th Highlanders of Canada), CASF. This battalion was disbanded on 1 November 1945.

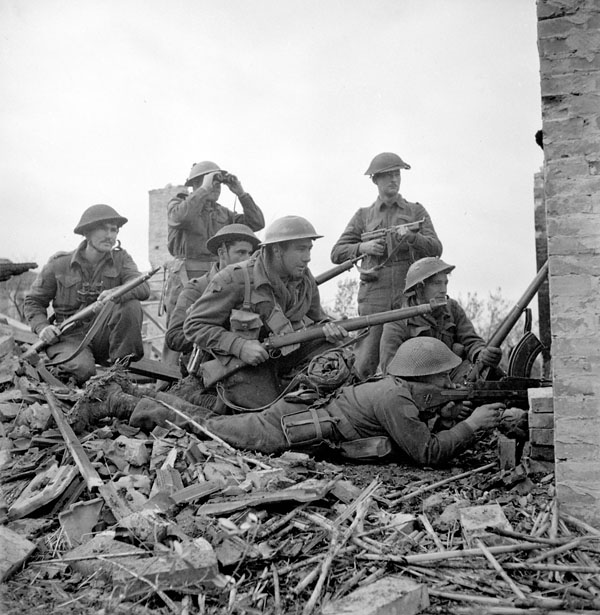
48th Highlanders of Canada 1943

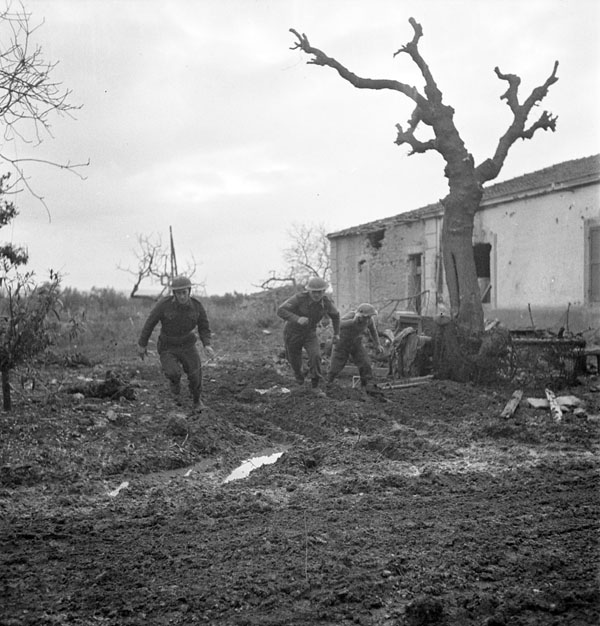
Riflemen of the 48th Highlanders of Canada take cover during a German counterattack north of San Leonardo di Ortona in the Moro River Campaign

== History ==
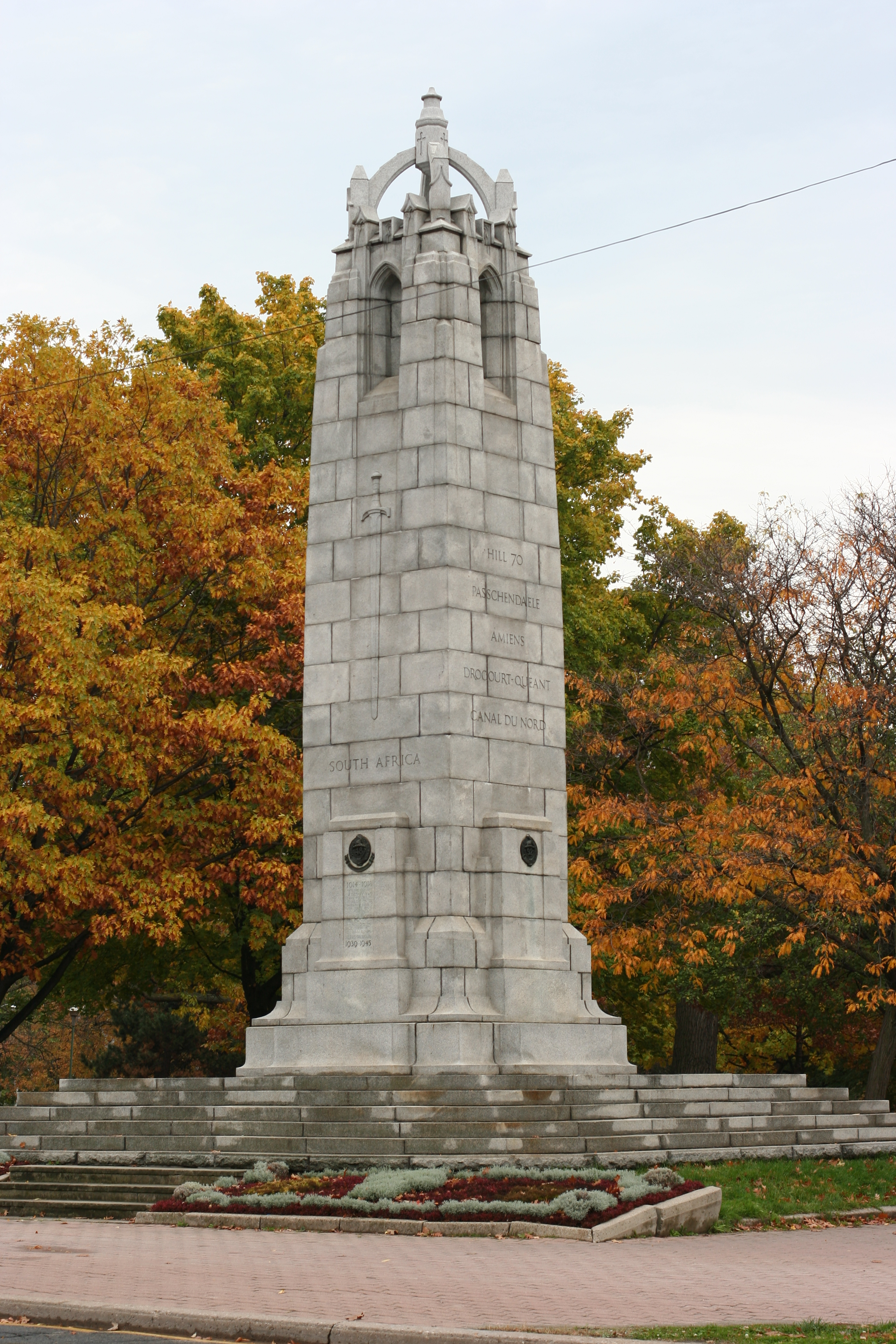
48th Highlanders of Canada Regimental Memorial, Queen's Park (Toronto)

Since its formation in 1891, the 48th Highlanders have had a longstanding tradition of participation in the life of its parent city, Toronto. The regiment has participated in community functions for over 100 years, in addition to fulfilling its operational duties around the world. Since its inception, the men and women of the regiment have been among the first Canadians to step forward and answer their nation's call. Members of the regiment have served on Operation Recuperation, in the Golan Heights, Korea, South Africa, Cambodia, Cyprus, Bosnia, Afghanistan, Ukraine and most recently Latvia, Poland and Iraq (Operation Inherent Resolve).

The regiment is allied with the British Army's Royal Regiment of Scotland, formerly the Highlanders (Seaforth, Gordons and Camerons) (formerly the Gordon Highlanders). The relationship with the Gordon Highlanders represents the oldest officially sanctioned regimental alliance in the Commonwealth, and small unit exchanges are conducted frequently.

A memorial was erected in Mount Pleasant Cemetery, Toronto sometime after 1912 in honour of two soldiers killed returning from a training exercise in 1912 and as a monument to the 48th Highlanders of Canada's veterans and war dead of the South African War.

The regiment provided a guard of honour for the G7 summit in 1988, a full royal guard of honour for Queen Elizabeth II in 1998 as well as the Royal Winter Fair, annually. The Regimental Colour Party has marched in events as far afield as Prince Edward Island and the United States and remains in great demand as a living example of the pageantry and gallantry of the Highland regimental tradition. On September 8th, 2022, the unit was one of the few Canadian units invited to send a procession contingent to march in and observe the funeral of Queen Elizabeth II. Special significance was attached to this event, as the 48th Highlanders were among the first three units to which she was appointed in October, 1947. Command of that contingent was under Lieutenant Colonel Jason Morische, CD.

The regiment's motto is dileas gu brath, which is Gaelic for "faithful forever". The regimental tartan is the Davidson, but pipers wear the Stewart of Fingask. The regiment's colonel-in-chief was Queen Elizabeth II until 8 September 2022, with her death.

== Alliances ==
=== Present ===
- United Kingdom – Royal Regiment of Scotland
- Australia - The Royal Victoria Regiment
- United States - 48th Infantry Brigade, Georgia Army National Guard (Army)

=== Past ===
- United Kingdom - The Gordon Highlanders (1904–1994)
- United Kingdom - The Highlanders (Seaforth, Gordons and Camerons) (1994–2006)

== Battle honours ==
Regimental colour

=== South African War ===
- South Africa, 1899–1900

=== First World War ===
- Ypres, 1915, '17
- Gravenstafel
- St. Julien
- Festubert, 1915
- Mount Sorrel
- Somme, 1916
- Pozières
- Thiepval
- Ancre Heights
- Arras, 1917, '18
- Vimy, 1917
- Arleux
- Scarpe 1917, '18
- Hill 70
- Passchendaele
- Amiens
- Drocourt–Quéant
- Hindenburg Line
- Canal du Nord
- Pursuit to Mons
- France and Flanders, 1915–18

=== Second World War ===
- Landing in Sicily
- Valguarnera
- Assoro
- Agira
- Adrano
- Regalbuto
- Sicily, 1943
- Landing at Reggio
- Campobasso
- Torella
- San Leonardo
- The Gully
- Ortona
- San Nicola–San Tommaso
- Cassino II
- Gustav Line
- Liri Valley
- Hitler Line
- Gothic Line
- Lamone Crossing
- Misano Ridge
- Rimini Line
- San Martino–San Lorenzo
- Fosso Vecchio
- Italy, 1943–1945
- Apeldoorn
- North-West Europe, 1945

=== War in Afghanistan ===
- Afghanistan

== 48th Highlanders of Canada Pipes & Drums ==
The regiment's Military Band and the Pipes and Drums have played at every Toronto Maple Leafs home opening game at both Maple Leaf Gardens and the Air Canada Centre. The bands were requested by Conn Smythe, who had been a major in the First World War, to play at the opening of the new Maple Leaf Gardens on 12 November 1931.

== "The Glamour Boys" & "The Dirty Four Dozen" ==
The regiment is nicknamed "The Glamour Boys" or "The Dirty Four Dozen".

The name "The Glamour Boys" was coined by the other regiments that served with the 48th Highlanders during World War II in the 1st Canadian Infantry Brigade of the 1st Canadian Infantry Division. The brigade was being inspected by King George VI but there were not enough regulation khaki puttees (leg wrappings) for all the soldiers. The 48th had to wear unofficial blue puttees. The King inquired as to why the 48th wore different puttees from the rest of the brigade. He was told that there were not enough khaki ones for all the units. The King replied that he liked the blue puttees better and that they should keep them. The 48th Highlanders continued to wear blue puttees until battledress was eventually phased out.

The nickname "Dirty Four Dozen" is a play on The Dirty Dozen and "48" being equivalent to four dozen.

== Cadets ==
The regiment supports two cadet corps. These are the 48th Highlanders Royal Canadian Army Cadet Corps, which is based in the same armoury as the regiment itself, and 142 St. Andrew's College Highland Cadet Corps, based in Aurora as one of the mandatory activities for students of St. Andrew's College.

== 48th Highlanders Museum ==
48th Highlanders of Canada Museum
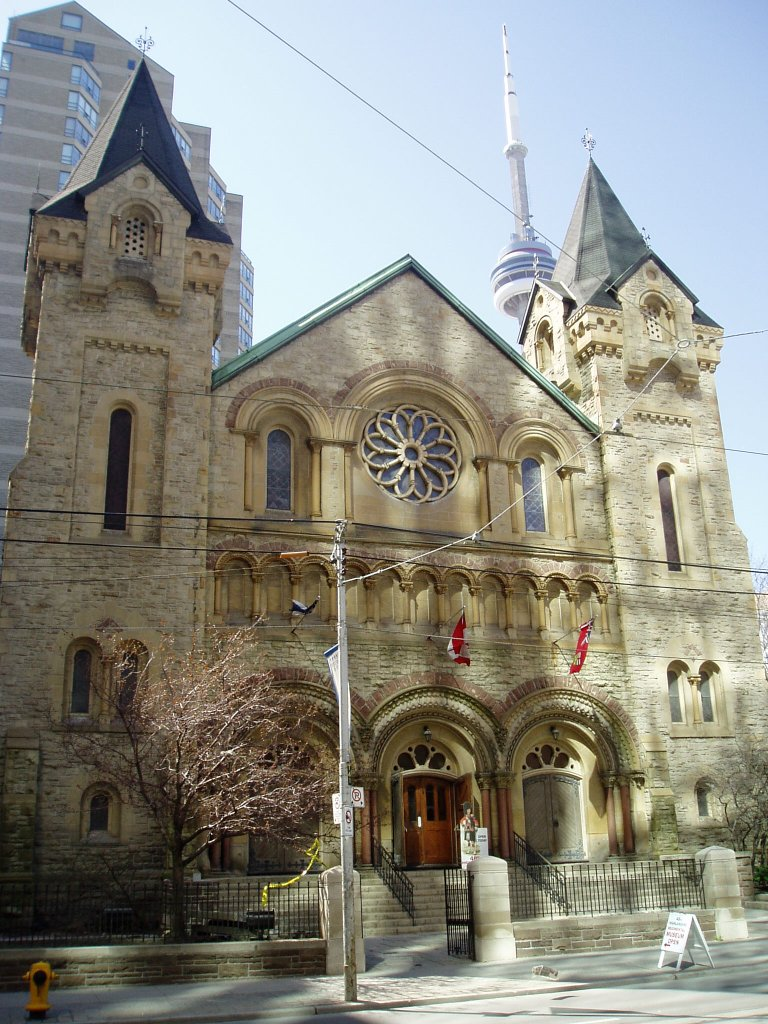
- Established: 1959
- Location: St. Andrew's Church at the comer of King and Simcoe in Toronto
- Website: http://www.48highlanders.com/04_03.html

The 48th Highlanders Museum is in downtown Toronto in the basement of St. Andrew's Church at the corner of King and Simcoe. The mission of the Museum is to collect, preserve, research and photograph material relating to the history of the 48th Highlanders of Canada, its former members and its site, and, through the appropriate display of such items, to convey this history to the currently serving members, the broader Canadian Forces community and the public. The museum includes regimental uniforms, medals, photographs, weapons and other artifacts. Founded in 1959, the museum opened in its current location in 1997. The Museum is affiliated with: CMA, CHIN, OMMC and Virtual Museum of Canada.

== Order of precedence ==
Preceded by The Essex and Kent Scottish	48th Highlanders of Canada	Succeeded by Le Régiment du Saguenay

== See also ==
- Canadian-Scottish regiment
- Regimental nicknames of the Canadian Forces
- Canadian war memorials
- Toronto Armories
