= Bantam =

Bantam or Bantams may refer to:

- Bantam (poultry), any small variety of fowl, usually of chicken or duck

== Businesses ==
- Bantam Books, an American publishing house
- Bantam Cider, an American cider company
- Bantam Press, a British publishing imprint
- American Bantam, a 1935 car company, formerly American Austin Car Company

== Military ==
- Bantam (military), a soldier shorter than 5'3" in the First World War
  - 143rd Battalion (British Columbia Bantams), CEF
  - 216th Battalion (Bantams), CEF
- Bantam (missile), a Swedish 1950s anti-tank missile
- BAT Bantam, a British 1920s biplane fighter aircraft
- Northrop X-4 Bantam, an American prototype small twinjet aircraft
- Douglas A-4 Skyhawk light attack aircraft, nicknamed Bantam Bomber

== Places ==
- Banten (town), also written as Bantam, a port town on island of Java, Indonesia in the East Indies islands
  - Banten Sultanate, or Bantam, 1527–1813
  - Banten, current province of Indonesia on territory of the former sultanate
- Bantam, Cocos (Keeling) Islands
- Bantam, Connecticut, U.S.A.
- Bantam, Ohio, U.S.A.
- Bantam River, Connecticut, U.S.A.

== Sports ==
- Bantam, U15 age category in minor ice hockey
- Bradford City A.F.C., nicknamed The Bantams, an English football club
- Trinity College Bantams, the varsity and club athletic teams of Trinity College (Connecticut)
- SC United Bantams, a soccer team in Columbia, South Carolina, U.S.
- Bantamweight, a weight class in combat sports and weightlifting.

== Transportation ==
- Micro Aviation B22 Bantam, a New Zealand microlight aircraft
- Warwick W-3 Bantam, an American homebuilt aircraft design
- Bantam (car), a 1913 British cyclecar
- American Bantam, name adopted by the former American Austin Car Company in 1935 until 1956
- Ford Bantam, a South African pickup truck from 1983
- BSA Bantam, a British motorcycle 1948–1971
- HNLMS Bantam (1938), a Dutch ship
- MS Bantam (1939), a Dutch ship
- SS Bantam (1930), a Dutch ship

== Other uses ==
- Bantam (comics), a comic character
- Bantam, official mascot of Trinity College (Connecticut)
- Bantam connector, a type of phone connector
- Bantam microRNA, a short RNA molecule

== See also ==
- Banten (disambiguation)
