= List of mounted regiments in the Canadian Expeditionary Force =

During the First World War, the Canadian government authorized the formation of several mounted regiments, including cavalry and mounted infantry, to serve in the Canadian Expeditionary Force on the Western Front .

Three regiments, the Royal Canadian Dragoons, Lord Strathcona's Horse, and the Fort Garry Horse, were part of the Canadian Cavalry Brigade, attached to British Army cavalry formations.

One regiment, the Canadian Light Horse, was the Canadian Corps' cavalry regiment.

Six regiments of mounted rifles served initially at the front as mounted infantry before being converted to infantry battalions. The remaining mounted rifle regiments were raised in Canada but broken up in England to provide reinforcements for other cavalry, mounted infantry and infantry units.

The regiments in bold type served in the field.

Cavalry and mounted rifle units of the Canadian Expeditionary Force
Regiment	Authorized	Disbanded	Perpetuation
**The Royal Canadian Dragoons**	21 December 1883	Extant	
**Lord Strathcona's Horse (Royal Canadians)**	1 July 1901	Extant	
**The Fort Garry Horse**	15 April 1912	Extant	
**Canadian Light Horse**	19 May 1916	6 November 1920	South Alberta Light Horse, 1st Hussars, and The North Saskatchewan Regiment
**1st Battalion, Canadian Mounted Rifles**	7 November 1914	15 November 1920	The North Saskatchewan Regiment and 118th Medium Battery, RCA
**2nd Battalion, Canadian Mounted Rifles**	7 November 1914	6 November 1920	The British Columbia Dragoons
**3rd Regiment, Canadian Mounted Rifles**	7 November 1914	12 August 1917	The South Alberta Light Horse
**4th Battalion, Canadian Mounted Rifles**	7 November 1914	6 November 1920	The Governor General's Horse Guards
**5th Battalion, Canadian Mounted Rifles**	7 November 1914	30 August 1920	The Sherbrooke Hussars
**6th Regiment, Canadian Mounted Rifles**	7 November 1914	18 February 1918	87th Field Battery, RCA, 88th Field Battery, RCA, and 8th Canadian Hussars (Princess Louise's)
7th Regiment, Canadian Mounted Rifles	7 November 1914	11 April 1918	The Governor General's Horse Guards
8th Regiment, Canadian Mounted Rifles	15 March 1915	8 December 1917	4th Princess Louise Dragoon Guards
9th Regiment, Canadian Mounted Rifles	7 November 1914	15 November 1920	The North Saskatchewan Regiment
10th Regiment, Canadian Mounted Rifles	7 November 1914	17 July 1917	The North Saskatchewan Regiment
11th Regiment, Canadian Mounted Rifles	7 November 1914	27 July 1918	The British Columbia Dragoons
12th Regiment, Canadian Mounted Rifles	15 March 1915	5 April 1918	The South Alberta Light Horse
13th Regiment, Canadian Mounted Rifles	15 March 1915	15 September 1917	The South Alberta Light Horse
