= Canadian Mounted Rifles =

Canadian Mounted Rifles was part of the designation of several mounted infantry units in Canada in the late 19th and early 20th centuries.

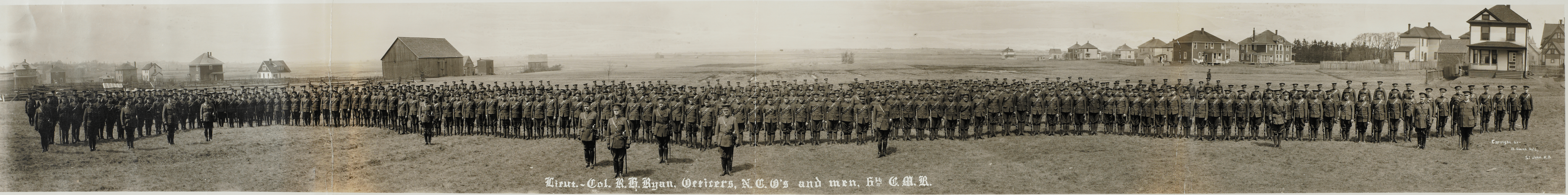
Lt. Col. R.H. Ryan, officers, NCO's and men, 6th CMR (HS85-10-30269)

== Units of the Permanent Active Militia ==
Permanent Active Militia was the proper name of Canada's full-time professional land forces from 1855 to 1940, when it was reorganized into the Canadian Army.

Regiment	Formed	Successor unit
The Canadian Mounted Rifle Corps	1885	The Royal Canadian Dragoons
The Royal Canadian Mounted Rifles	1901	Lord Strathcona's Horse (Royal Canadians)

== Units formed for the Second Boer War ==
Regiment	Perpetuation
1st Battalion, Canadian Mounted Rifles	Renamed as The Royal Canadian Dragoons (Special Service Force) in August 1900 and referred to as the Second Canadian Contingent
2nd (1st) Battalion, Canadian Mounted Rifles	Sailed as part of the Second Canadian Contingent, landing in South Africa in February 1900. Renamed as the 1st Battalion, Canadian Mounted Rifles in 1900. Recruited by the North-West Mounted Police and now perpetuated by the Royal Canadian Mounted Police Fought with the RCD at the Battle of Leliefontein in 1900.
2nd Battalion, Canadian Mounted Rifles	Raised in November 1901 and landed in South Africa in January 1902. Fought at the Battle of Hart's River in 1902.
3rd Regiment, Canadian Mounted Rifles	Raised in late 1901. Went to South Africa in May/June 1902, but never saw action Billy Eagle served in the 5th CMR.
4th Regiment, Canadian Mounted Rifles	Raised in late 1901. Went to South Africa in May/June 1902, but never saw action Billy Eagle served in the 5th CMR.
5th Regiment, Canadian Mounted Rifles	Raised in late 1901. Went to South Africa in May/June 1902, but never saw action Billy Eagle served in the 5th CMR.
6th Regiment, Canadian Mounted Rifles	Raised in late 1901. Went to South Africa in May/June 1902, but never saw action Billy Eagle served in the 5th CMR.

=== Structure ===
It was originally intended that the second Canadian contingent would consist of a CMR unit of three squadrons recruited among the militia located in eastern Canada. This concept provoked disagreement at the highest Canadian political level, as the Governor General believed that more troops should be recruited in western Canada where more individuals had relevant civilian experience. As a political compromise, two units of two sabre squadrons each were formed, despite the lack of tactical sense to such a structure.

The third contingent was recruited at the expense of the British government and consisted of one 901-person unit - 2 CMR - that contained six sabre squadrons.

The fourth contingent consisted of four units, each with four sabre squadrons, that have been described as the only sensibly organized Canadian mounted units in the war, other than the Strathcona's Horse. These units arrived in South Africa after the war had ended.

== Independent squadrons of the Non-Permanent Active Militia ==
Squadron	Successor Unit
B Squadron, Canadian Mounted Rifles	12th Manitoba Dragoons
C Squadron, Canadian Mounted Rifles	12th Manitoba Dragoons
D Squadron, Canadian Mounted Rifles	12th Manitoba Dragoons
E Squadron, Canadian Mounted Rifles	12th Manitoba Dragoons
F Squadron, Canadian Mounted Rifles	12th Manitoba Dragoons
J Squadron, Canadian Mounted Rifles	The Mississauga Horse
K Squadron, Canadian Mounted Rifles	The Mississauga Horse
L Squadron, Canadian Mounted Rifles	The Prince Edward Island Light Horse
A Squadron, Canadian Mounted Rifles	19th Alberta Dragoons
B Squadron, Canadian Mounted Rifles	19th Alberta Dragoons
C Squadron, Canadian Mounted Rifles	19th Alberta Dragoons
E Squadron, Canadian Mounted Rifles	19th Alberta Dragoons
D Squadron, Canadian Mounted Rifles	21st Alberta Hussars
G Squadron, Canadian Mounted Rifles	The Saskatchewan Mounted Rifles
F Squadron, Canadian Mounted Rifles	The Saskatchewan Mounted Rifles
B Squadron, Canadian Mounted Rifles	The British Columbia Horse (later reorganized into The British Columbia Dragoons and the British Columbia Hussars)
C Squadron, Canadian Mounted Rifles	The British Columbia Horse (later reorganized into The British Columbia Dragoons and the British Columbia Hussars)

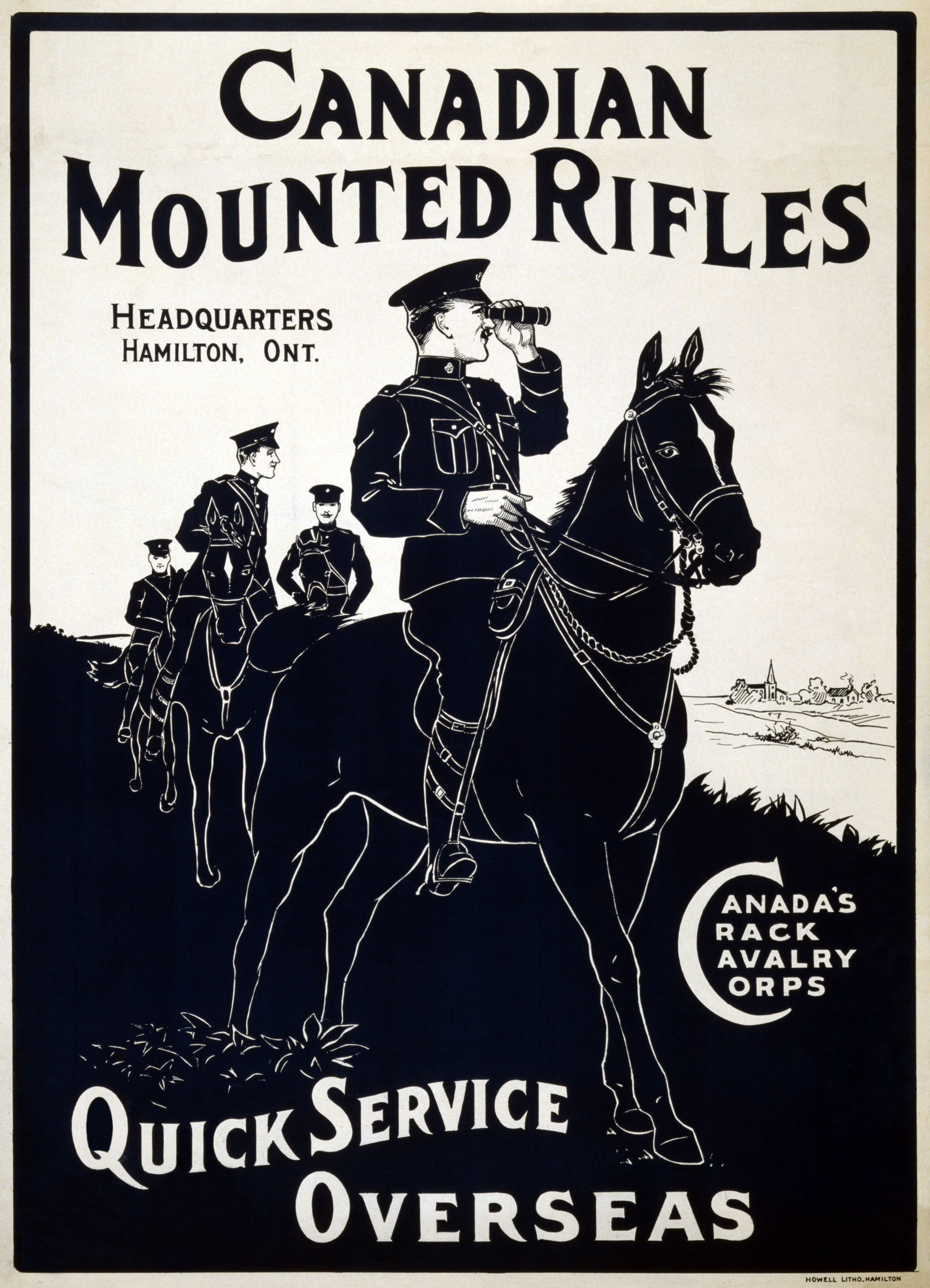
Canadian Mounted Rifles recruitment poster

== Units of the Canadian Expeditionary Force of the First World War ==
Regiment	Perpetuation
1st Regiment, Canadian Mounted Rifles (later 1st Battalion, Canadian Mounted Rifles)	The Manitoba Mounted Rifles (now part of the 118th Medium Battery, RCA – currently on the Supplementary Order of Battle) and The Saskatchewan Mounted Rifles (now part of The North Saskatchewan Regiment)
2nd Regiment, Canadian Mounted Rifles (later 2nd Battalion, Canadian Mounted Rifles)	The British Columbia Dragoons
3rd Regiment, Canadian Mounted Rifles	19th Alberta Dragoons (now part of the South Alberta Light Horse)
4th Regiment, Canadian Mounted Rifles (later 4th Battalion, Canadian Mounted Rifles)	The Governor General's Horse Guards
5th Regiment, Canadian Mounted Rifles (later 5th Battalion, Canadian Mounted Rifles)	The Eastern Townships Mounted Rifles and the 7th/11th Hussars (now part of the Sherbrooke Hussars)
6th Regiment, Canadian Mounted Rifles	The King's Canadian Hussars and the 8th Canadian Hussars (Princess Louise's)
7th Regiment, Canadian Mounted Rifles	The Governor General's Horse Guards
8th Regiment, Canadian Mounted Rifles	The Princess Louise Dragoon Guards (now part of the 4th Princess Louise Dragoon Guards)
9th Regiment, Canadian Mounted Rifles	The Saskatchewan Mounted Rifles (now part of The North Saskatchewan Regiment)
10th Regiment, Canadian Mounted Rifles	The Saskatchewan Mounted Rifles (now part of The North Saskatchewan Regiment)
11th Regiment, Canadian Mounted Rifles	The British Columbia Dragoons
12th Regiment, Canadian Mounted Rifles	15th Canadian Light Horse (now part of the South Alberta Light Horse)
13th Regiment, Canadian Mounted Rifles	South Alberta Light Horse

== See also ==
- List of mounted regiments in the Canadian Expeditionary Force
- List of infantry battalions in the Canadian Expeditionary Force
- Mounted Infantry
- Canadian Militia
- History of the Canadian Army
- Permanent Active Militia
- Non-Permanent Active Militia
- Military history of Canada during World War I
- Australian Light Horse
- Imperial Yeomanry
- Otter Commission
