= Mississauga Horse =

The Mississauga Horse
- Active: 1901 - 1936
- Country: Canada
- Branch: Canadian Militia
- Type: Line Cavalry
- Role: Cavalry
- Size: One Regiment
- Part of: Non-Permanent Active Militia
- Garrison/HQ: Toronto, Ontario
- March: John Peel
- Engagements: First World War
- Battle honours: See #Battle honours

The Mississauga Horse was a cavalry regiment of the Non-Permanent Active Militia of the Canadian Militia (now the Canadian Army). In 1936, they were amalgamated with The Governor General's Body Guard to form The Governor General's Horse Guards.

== Lineage ==
- 1 April 1901: Toronto Mounted Rifles formed from J and K Squadrons Canadian Mounted Rifles
- 1 April 1903: 9th Toronto Light Horse
- 1 May 1905: 9th Mississauga Horse
- 15 Mar 1920: The Ontario Mounted Rifles
- 1 April 1924: The Mississauga Horse
- 15 December 1936: amalgamated with The Governor General's Body Guard, to form The Governor General's Horse Guards

== Perpetuations ==
- 4th Regiment, Canadian Mounted Rifles
- 7th Regiment, Canadian Mounted Rifles
- 216th Battalion (Bantams), CEF

== History ==
It was originally formed as the Toronto Mounted Rifles at Toronto, Ontario, on April 1, 1901, by combining J and K Squadrons of the Canadian Mounted Rifles with three newly raised companies. In 1903 the regiment was renamed to the 9th Toronto Light Horse and in 1907 it was renamed to the 9th Mississauga Horse. This was a reference to the First Nation that inhabited the area before the Europeans, the Mississaugas.

The 9th Mississauga Horse contributed many volunteers to the Canadian Expeditionary Force during World War I, in particular to the 75th Battalion and the 170th (Mississauga Horse) Battalion, CEF.

In 1920 the regiment was renamed The Ontario Mounted Rifles and in 1924 it was renamed The Mississauga Horse. The regimental march was John Peel.

On 15 December 1936, as part of the 1936 Canadian Militia Reorganization, the regiment was amalgamated with The Governor General's Body Guard to form The Governor General's Horse Guards, an armoured militia (i.e., part-time reservist) regiment, which still exists today as part of 32 Canadian Brigade Group in Toronto.

== Organization ==
=== 9th Toronto Light Horse (01 April, 1903) ===
- A Squadron (Toronto, Ontario)
- B Squadron (Toronto, Ontario)
- C Squadron (Toronto, Ontario)
- D Squadron (Toronto, Ontario)

=== The Ontario Mounted Rifles (01 May, 1921) ===
- Regimental Headquarters (Toronto, Ontario)
- A Squadron (Toronto, Ontario)
- B Squadron (Toronto, Ontario)
- C Squadron (Toronto, Ontario)

== Battle honours ==
In 1929 the regiment was awarded battle honours for the Great War.

- Mount Sorrel (Note: Selected to be borne on colours and appointments)
- Somme, 1916
- Flers-Courcelette
- Ancre Heights
- Arras, 1917, '18
- Vimy, 1917
- Hill 70
- Ypres, 1917
- Passchendaele
- Amiens
- Scarpe, 1918
- Hindenburg Line
- Canal du Nord
- Cambrai, 1918
- Valenciennes
- Sambre
- France and Flanders, 1915–18

== Notable members ==
- Billy Bishop: World War I flying ace
- Brigadier Leslie Booth DSO & Bar ED

== See also ==
- List of regiments of cavalry of the Canadian Militia (1900–1920)
