= 8th Hussars =

The 8th Hussars or 8th Hussar Regiment may refer to the following military units:

- 8th King's Royal Irish Hussars, a British Army cavalry regiment active 1719–1958
- 8th Canadian Hussars (Princess Louise's), a Canadian Army regiment active 1848-Present Day
