= 6th Regiment, Canadian Mounted Rifles =

- Active: 1915–1916
- Country: Canada
- Branch: Canadian Expeditionary Force
- Type: Mounted infantry
- Role: Mounted infantry, infantry
- Size: One regiment
- Battle honours: France and Flanders, 1915

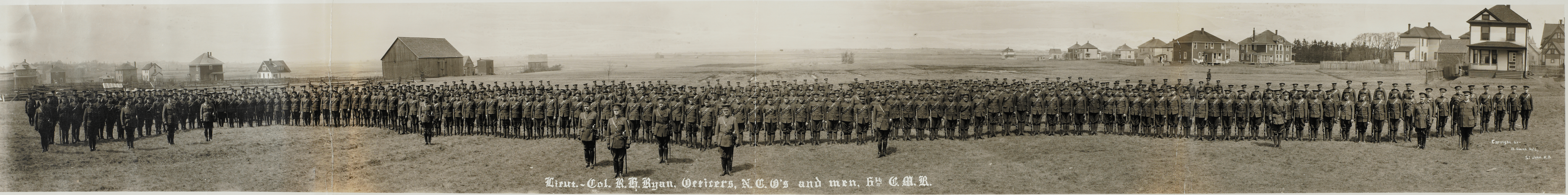
Lieutenant Coronel R.H. Ryan and officers of the 6th Canadian Mountain Rifles regiment

The 6th Regiment, Canadian Mounted Rifles, CEF, was a mounted infantry unit of the Canadian Expeditionary Force in the First World War.

== History ==
The regiment was formed on March 15, 1915, at Amherst, Nova Scotia. It recruited in Nova Scotia, New Brunswick, and Prince Edward Island. It sailed to England in July 1915, and after training arrived in France on October 22, 1915. It served in the field as infantry until December 1915.

On January 1, 1916, the six regiments of Canadian Mounted Rifles were converted to infantry and reorganized into the four battalions of the 8th Canadian Infantry Brigade. The personnel of the 6th Regiment were absorbed into the 4th and 5th Battalions, CMR.

== Perpetuation ==
The 6th Regiment was perpetuated by the King's Canadian Hussars, which was converted to an artillery unit in 1939, and from 1960 by the 8th Canadian Hussars (Princess Louise's).

== Battle honours ==
- France and Flanders, 1915

== See also ==
- List of mounted regiments in the Canadian Expeditionary Force
