= Dragoon helmet =

Combat helmet

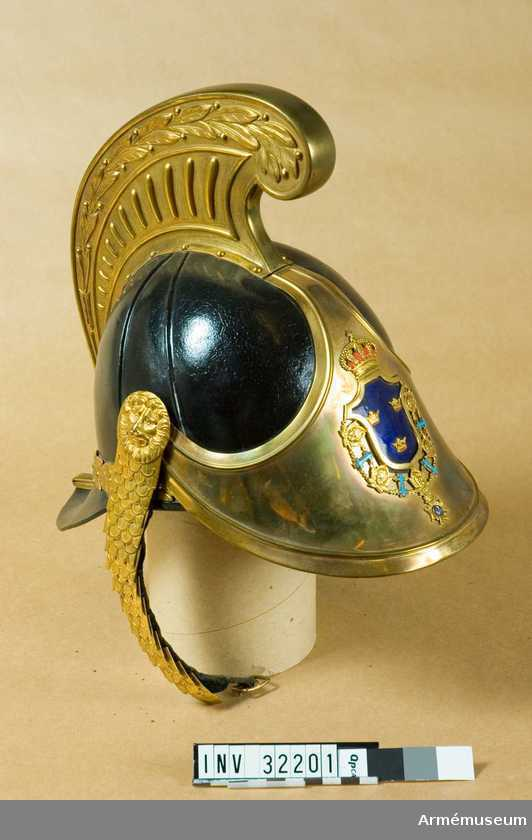
Helmet used by the Swedish Life Guards, c. 1823

A dragoon helmet is an ornate style of metal combat helmet featuring a tall crest; they were initially used by dragoons, but later by other types of heavy cavalry and some other military units. Originating in France in the second half of the 18th century, it was widely imitated by other European armies and was last used in combat in 1914. Some military units continue to wear this style of helmet for parades and other ceremonial duties and responsibilities for that particular people.

== History ==
18th century European dragoon cavalry generally wore tricorn hats, but in 1762, the French Army introduced a new uniform for their dragoon regiments, featuring a crested helmet, loosely based on classical Ancient Greek and Roman styles. It was made of steel with a brass crest and featured an imitation panther fur "turban" and a long black horsehair mane or plume. One distinctive example of this kind of headgear is the Tarleton helmet. By the end of the century, it had developed a taller, more elegant shape and a removable feather plume at the side, which was only worn on parade. The dragoon helmet was also adopted by the French cuirassier regiments which were first formed in 1803, and by French engineers. In 1812, the French engineer corps became responsible for the Paris fire brigade, the Sapeurs-pompiers, who also adopted the dragoon helmet; this was later copied and adapted by other European fire services, including the London Fire Brigade who introduced the crested Merryweather helmet in 1868 following a visit to Paris by Captain Sir Eyre Massey Shaw.

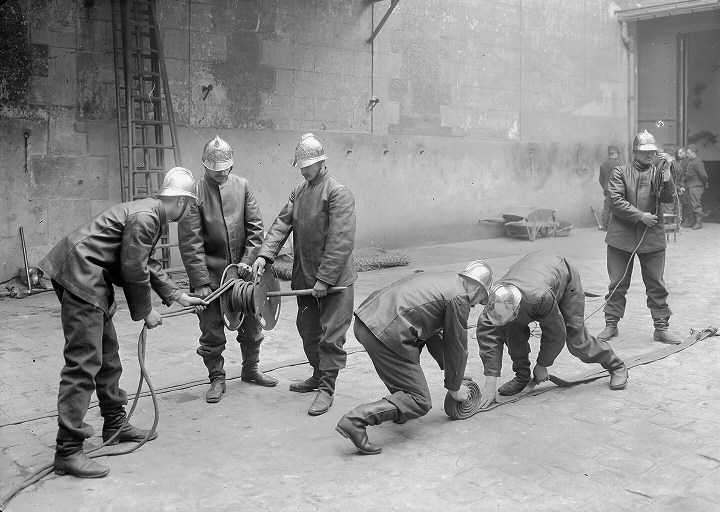
Members of the Paris Fire Brigade in dragoon helmets, c. 1900.

In 1798, the Imperial and Royal Austrian Army introduced a crested helmet for nearly all their troops; it was made of leather with metal fittings and had a woollen "comb" instead of the French mane. A taller version of this helmet was adopted by the dragoon regiments of the Imperial Russian Army in 1803, replacing a bicorn hat. British dragoons and dragoon guards adopted a helmet of the Austrian style in 1812, but quickly replaced the woollen comb (known as a "roach" in British service) with a horsehair mane; the Household Cavalry however, followed the opposite path, first adopting horsehair but rapidly replacing it with a woollen comb.

In the century that followed, the dragoon helmet continued to be worn both on parade and in battle. In 1842, the Prussian Army replaced their crested helmets with one surmounted by a spike, the Pickelhaube. The British heavy cavalry, who in 1817 had adopted the "Roman Pattern" helmet with a huge bearskin crest, replaced it in 1847 with the "Albert Pattern", a spiked helmet with a falling horsehair plume, which could be removed when on campaign. The Albert Pattern helmet was also used by cavalry raised in various parts of the British Empire, for example, The Governor General's Horse Guards, formed in Canada in 1855.

As the power and accuracy of weapons increased, so conspicuous headgear like the cavalry helmet began to be discarded in favour of more practical designs. Bavaria, however, would stick to the Raupenhelm (caterpillar helmet), this unmistakable feature of many of its army's uniforms, until the adoption of prussian models only after King Ludwig's death in 1886. In France, the traditional uniform was considered to increase the esprit de corps of the heavy cavalry in their role as shock troops and the French dragoons and cuirassiers rode to war in them in 1914, the only concession to modern warfare being drab-coloured helmet covers which were first issued in 1902.

== Current use ==
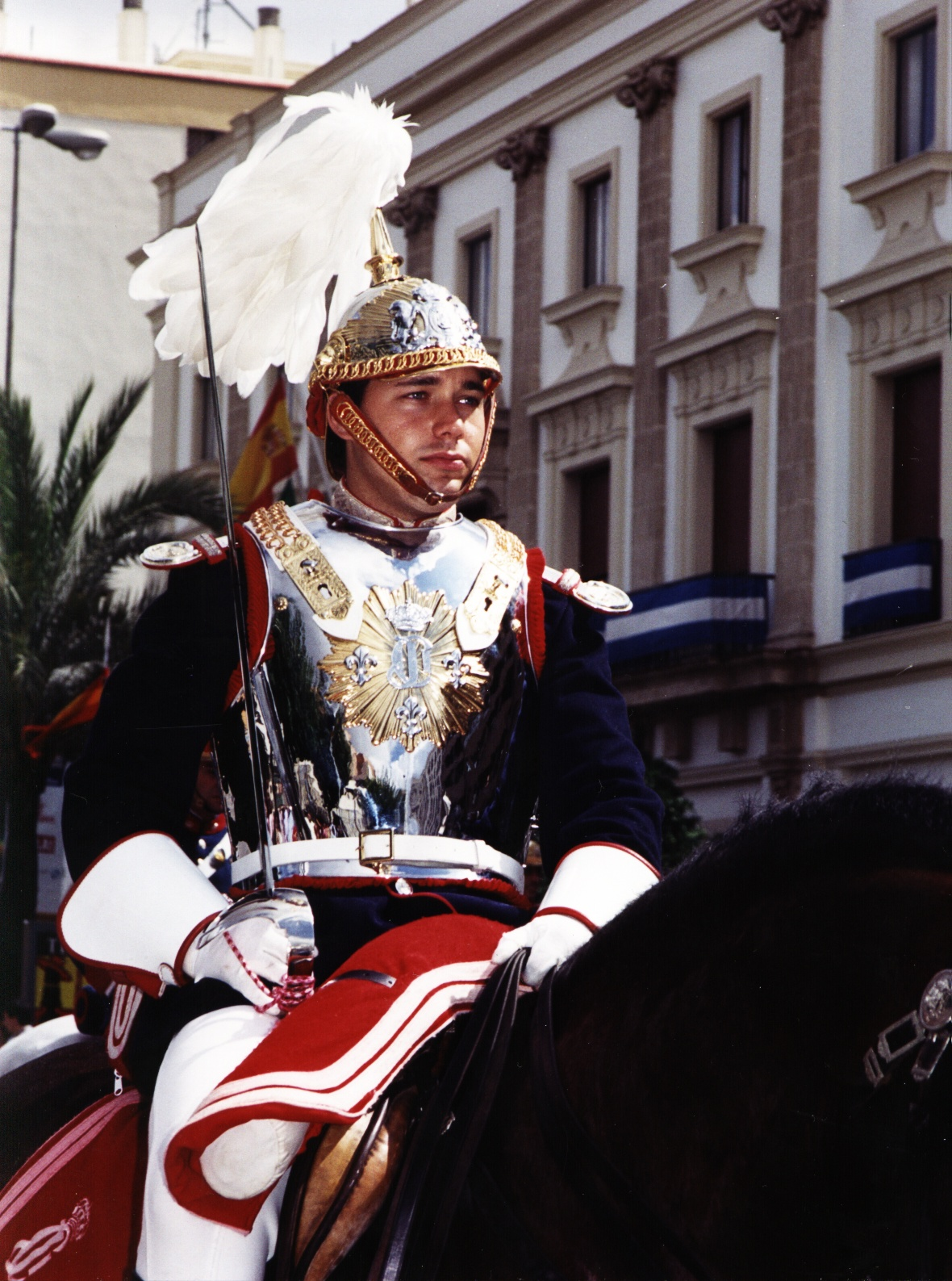
Member of the Spanish Royal Guard

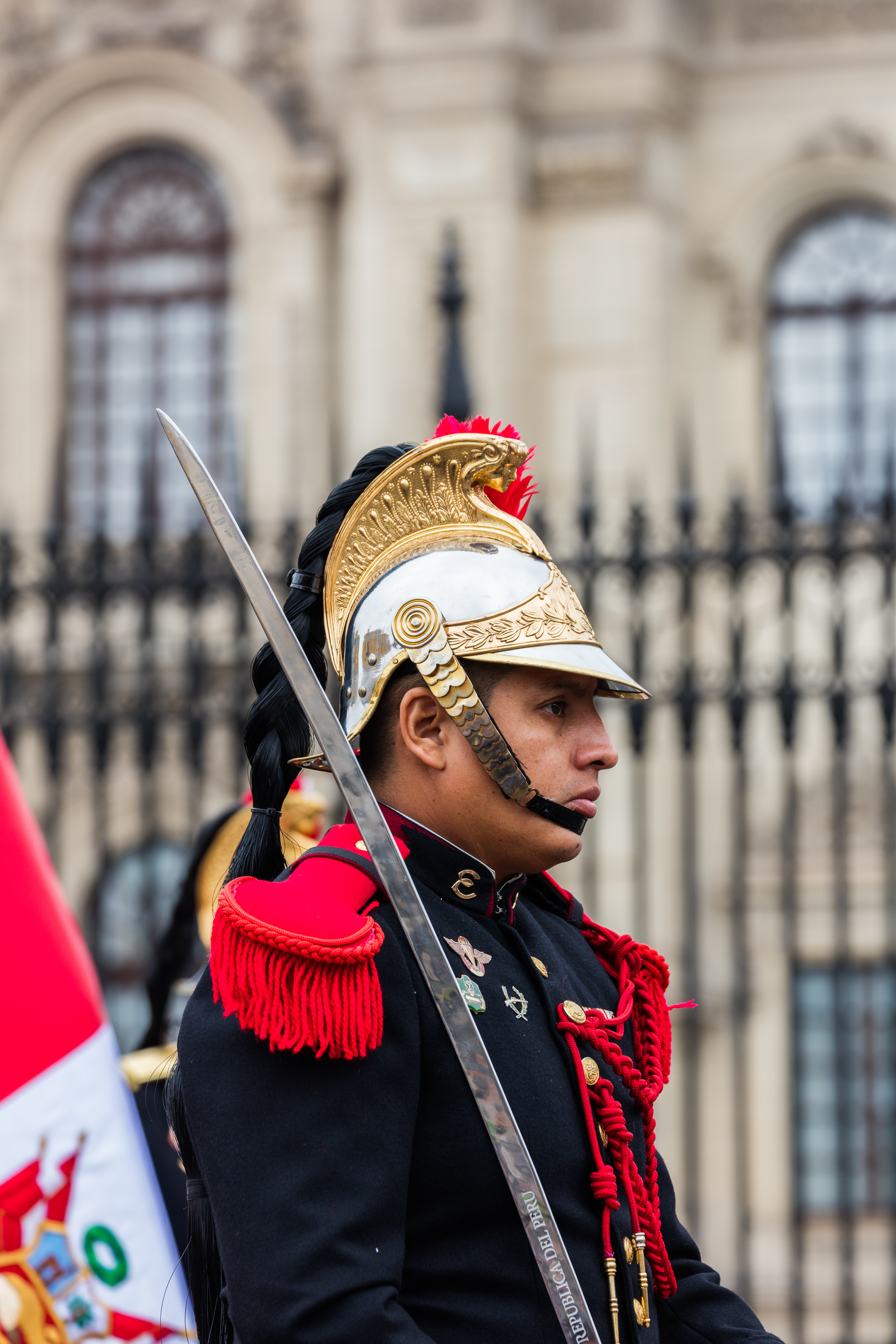
Member of the Presidential Life Guard Dragoons Regiment

Several countries use dragoon helmets as a part of their full dress uniforms

Variants of the dragoon helmet are still worn for ceremonial duties by a number of horsed units:

- Independence Dragoons (Brazil)
- Lord Strathcona's Horse (Royal Canadians) (Canada)
- The Governor General's Horse Guards (Canada)
- The Royal Canadian Dragoons (Canada)
- The Cavalry Regiment of the Republican Guard (France)
- Cuirassiers Regiment (Italy)
- Presidential Life Guard Dragoons Regiment, (Peru)
- The Cuirassiers' Troop of the Royal Guard (Spain)
- Life Guards (Sweden)
- Blues and Royals (United Kingdom)
- Life Guards (United Kingdom)

== Sources ==
- Blackstone, Geoffrey Vaughan (1957), A History of the British Fire Service, Routledge
- Chartrand, René (1997), Louis XV's Army (4): Light Troops and Specialists, Osprey Publishing, ISBN 978-1855326248
- Fosten, Bryan (1982), Wellington's Heavy Cavalry, Osprey Publishing, ISBN 978-0850454741
- Haythornthwaite, Philip (1988), Napoleon's Specialist Troops Osprey Books, ISBN 9781780969794
- Kannik, Preben (1968), Military Uniforms of the World in Colour, Blandford Press Ltd, ISBN 0-71370482-9
- Mollo, John (1972), Military Fashion: A Comparative History of the Uniforms of the Great Armies from the 17th Century to the First World War, Barrie & Jenkins, ISBN 978-0214653490
- Wood, Stephen (2015), Those Terrible Grey Horses: An Illustrated History of the Royal Scots Dragoon Guards, Osprey Publishing, ISBN 978-1472810625
