= 14th Hussars =

The 14th Hussars or 14th Hussar Regiment may refer to the following military units:

- 14th King's Hussars, a former British Army cavalry regiment active 1715-1922
- King's Canadian Hussars, a former Canadian Militia cavalry regiment active 1874-1939, previously known as the 14th King's Canadian Hussars (1904-1920)
- 14th Canadian Hussars, a former Canadian Army cavalry/armoured regiment active 1910-1968
- 14th (2nd Kurhessian) Hussars "Landgrave Frederick II of Hesse-Homburg" (Imperial German Army)
- 14th Mitavsky Hussar Regiment (Imperial Russian Army)
