= Banten (disambiguation) =

Banten is a province of Indonesia.

Banten may also refer to:

- Banten Sultanate, a historical Islamic monarchy in Banten, Indonesia
- Banten (town), a historical port town in Banten, Indonesia
- Old Banten, an archaeological site in Banten, Indonesia
- Banten Bay, a bay in Banten, Indonesia

== See also ==
- Bantam (disambiguation)
- Bantenese (disambiguation)
