= 1st (Halifax-Dartmouth) Field Artillery Regiment, RCA =

- Cap Badge
- Active: 1791–present
- Country: Canada
- Branch: Canadian Army - Primary Reserve
- Type: Field Artillery
- Size: Regiment
- Part of: 36 Canadian Brigade Group
- Garrison/HQ: 73 Hobsons Lake Drive, Halifax
- Mottos: Latin: UBIQUE, lit. "Everywhere" & QUO FAS ET GLORIA DUCUNT, lit. "Whither right and glory lead"
- Utilized Weapons: LG-1 Mark II Howitzer
- Website: https://rca-arc.org/1st-halifax-dartmouth-field-artillery-regiment-rca/

Commanders
- Commanding Officer: Lieutenant-Colonel S. Misner, CD
- Regimental Sergeant Major: Chief Warrant Officer E. Craig, CD
- Honorary Colonel: Nil.
- Honorary Lieutenant-Colonel (51 Battery): Honorary Lieutenant-Colonel V. Sood CFA, ICD.D
- Honorary Lieutenant-Colonel (84 Battery): Honorary Lieutenant-Colonel R.I. d’Entremont, CM, ONS, DComm

Insignia
- NATO Map Symbol (2017)

The 1st (Halifax-Dartmouth) Field Artillery Regiment, RCA, is a Canadian Army reserve artillery regiment. It is located in Halifax, Nova Scotia, at 73 Hobson Lake Drive. The unit consists of two batteries, 51st and 84th Field Batteries (87th Field Battery existing only on paper since the late 1990s). There are two units located within 1st (Halifax-Dartmouth) Field Artillery Regiment. One is in Halifax and the other is the 84th Independent Field Battery located in Yarmouth NS. Both share the same Commanding Officer.

== History ==
=== Pre and Postconfederation ===
The regiment traces its lineage back to the Halifax Volunteer Artillery, which may have been in existence as early as 1776. The unit was officially recognized in 1791 and served into the mid-19th century, when it underwent a series of name changes. In 1885, the unit, then known as the 1st "Halifax" Brigade of Garrison Artillery, sent two batteries with the Halifax Provisional Battalion to participate in the suppression of North-West Rebellion.

=== World War I ===
At the onset of World War I the 1st Halifax, by then designated as the 1st "Halifax" Regiment, CA, was called to active duty. It provided home defence in Halifax and served as a training unit for new artillery recruits throughout the war. It reverted to militia status after the end of the conflict and went through another series of name changes.

=== World War II ===
In 1939, as World War II loomed, the unit, by then known as the "1st (Halifax) Coast Brigade, RCA", was again called to active service. As in World War I, the 1st Halifax served in a home defence capacity and trained new recruits. The unit was re-designated as the "1st (Halifax) Heavy Anti-Aircraft Regiment, RCA" in 1942 and armed with British-made QF 3.7 inch AA guns.

=== Post War ===
After the end of World War II, in 1955, the unit was re-armed with American-made 90 mm guns and re-designated as a Medium Anti-Aircraft Regiment. It acquired its current name, the 1st (Halifax-Dartmouth) Field Artillery Regiment, RCA, in 1960 when it was issued 105 mm howitzers and merged with the 36th Medium Anti-Aircraft Regiment, RCA, from Eastern Passage, Nova Scotia.

== Lineage ==
The unit perpetuates the No. 9 Canadian Siege Battery, CEF which was stood up by combining multiple local batteries in 1869 and then attached to the 1st (Halifax) and again made independent in 1924. Over the course of the 20th century the Siege Battery was attached and detached until on April 1, 1946, it was amalgamated to the 1st (Reserve) (Halifax) Coast Brigade, RCA. All battle honours of the No. 9 Canadian Siege Battery are born by 1st (Halifax-Dartmouth) Field Artillery Regiment.

== Today ==
The Halifax-Dartmouth today parade at 73 Hobson Lake Drive, Halifax, NS. The unit parades 7-pm to 10-pm on Tuesday Evenings and one weekend per month in Bayers Lake, NS. Trades that are available in this unit are, Artillery Officer, Gunner, Financial Services Administrator and Human Resources Administrator. 2501 1st Halifax-Dartmouth Field Artillery Regiment Cadet Corps is affiliated with the unit. On paper the unit is composed of three batteries

- 51 Battery (Halifax)
- 87 Battery (Halifax)
- 84 Battery (Yarmouth)

The Unit is under 36th Brigade, 5th Division which alongside other units of the formation, garrison the East Coast.

=== Mission task ===
Although being an artillery unit, the unit's mission task pertains to the local needs. The East Coast is unfortunately hit harder than other parts of Canada in terms of natural disasters, being prone to hurricanes and blizzards. The unit has thus ended up and adapted to the mission task of, "Light Urban Search and Rescue." "A troop of 35 members, which is trained in specialized rescue skills and the use of rescue tools, including search techniques, first aid, and structural integrity assessments, to provide support to civil authorities in situations of urban disaster emergencies."

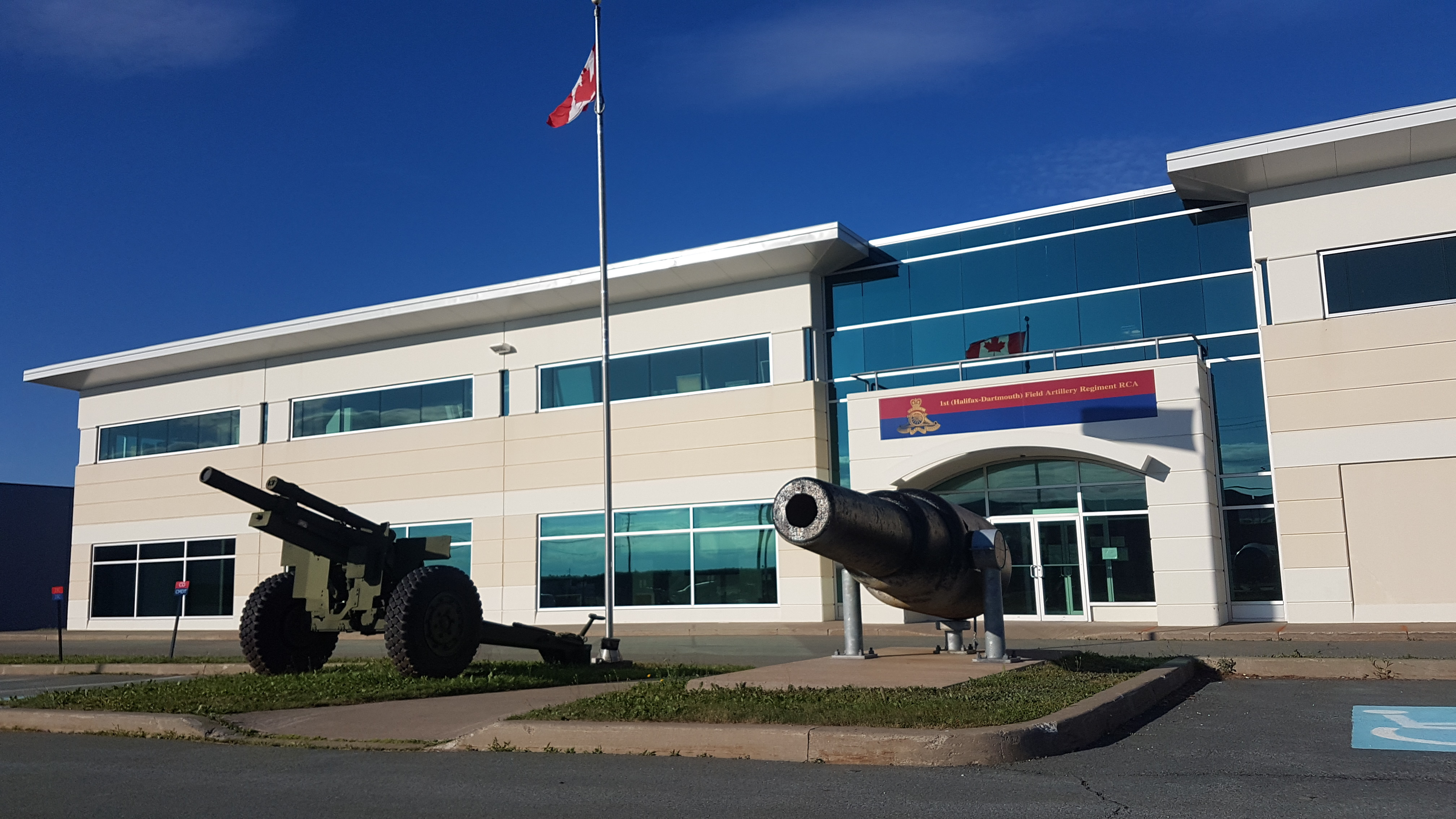
Armoury of 1st (Halifax-Dartmouth) Field Artillery Regiment

=== Equipment ===
As any combat arms unit in the Canadian Army, members are regularly equipped with personal weapons but being an artillery unit, also with short-long range artillery.

- Personal weapons
  - C7A2
  - C9A2
  - C22
- Weapons Systems
  - LG1 Mark ll Howitzer

== See also ==
- List of armouries in Canada
- Military history of Canada
- History of the Canadian Army
- Canadian Forces

== Armoury ==
In 2012 Regimental Headquarters (RHQ) and 51 Battery, moved from the Halifax Armoury to their new facility at 73 Hobson Lake Drive. This building, which was purpose built to facilitate an artillery battery, is often used for Basic Military Qualification Courses (BMQ) and other training courses and conferences.

Site	Date(s)	Designated	Location	Description	Image
Halifax Armoury; 2667 North Park Street	1895-99 (completed)	National Historic Sites of Canada; Classified - 1991 Register of the Government of Canada Heritage Buildings	north central Halifax Regional Municipality	Housing 1st (Halifax-Dartmouth) Field Artillery Regiment, and The Princess Louise Fusiliers this large, urban, Romanesque Revival drill hall, was built for the active militia, of red rough faced brick	

== Order of precedence ==
Preceded by 5^{e} Régiment d'artillerie légère du Canada	1st (Halifax-Dartmouth) Field Artillery Regiment	Succeeded by 1st (Halifax-Dartmouth) Field Artillery Regiment, RCA of Royal Canadian Artillery

== Media ==
- Shelldrake: Canadian Artillery Museums and Gun Monuments by Harold A. Skaarup (Feb 1 2012)
- Officers Who Served Overseas in the Great War with the Canadian Artillery 1914-1919 by Canadian Artillery Association (Sep 1 2011)
- Battery Flashes of W.W. II: A Thumb-Nail Sketch of Canadian Artillery Batteries during the 1939-1945 Conflict by D. W. Falconer (1985)
