= Bantenese =

Bantenese may refer to:

- Something of, from, or related to Banten, Banten, Java, Indonesia
- Bantenese language, a dialect of Sundanese language spoken in Banten
- Bantenese people, a Sundanese community of people living in Banten

== See also ==
- Banten (disambiguation)
