= Albert helmet =

British helmet designed by Prince Albert

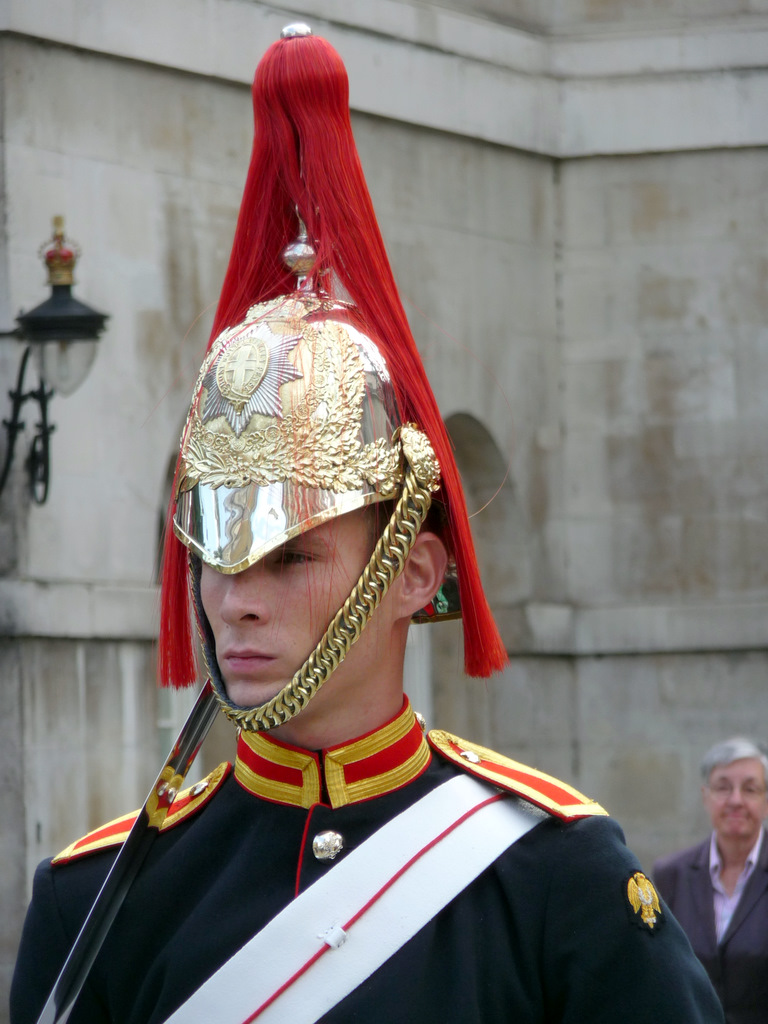
A Blues and Royals trooper wearing an Albert helmet

The Albert helmet is a type of dragoon helmet introduced by the British military in the 19th century. The helmet was developed by Prince Albert of Saxe-Coburg and Gotha in 1842, and was first introduced for service with the Household Cavalry in 1843. The helmet was introduced to other heavy cavalry units in the British Empire in 1847.

In the 20th and 21st centuries, the helmet has persisted as a type of full dress headgear used by several British and Canadian cavalry regiments. This includes the Blues and Royals and the Life Guards of the British Household Cavalry, and the Royal Canadian Dragoons, Lord Strathcona’s Horse, and Governor General's Horse Guards of the Royal Canadian Armoured Corps.

== History ==
The Albert helmet was developed by, and named for, Prince Albert, the husband of Queen Victoria in 1842. It was a metal helmet based on those worn by cavalry in the Prussian Army. It was adopted by the Household Cavalry, where it replaced the bearskin-crested 1822 pattern helmet, from 1843 and by other heavy cavalry regiments from 1847.

The Albert helmet was metal (gilt with silver fittings for officers and brass with white metal fittings for other ranks). It was surmounted with a spike from which a hair plume was attached. The plumes varied between the regiments. In the Household Cavalry the Royal Horse Guards wore a red plume and the 1st (Royal) Regiment of Dragoons black. The two regiments of Life Guards both wore white plumes, the distinction being in how the plume fell. In the 1st Regiment it fell normally, in the 2nd Regiment it was gathered into a ball-shaped "onion" at the top of the spike, before falling. The dragoon guards regiments wore black plumes until 1857 when the 1st King's Dragoon Guards switched to a red plume. When on active duty overseas the plume was often plaited or not worn at all.

The helmet received generally good reviews in the media. One observer called them "handsome, light and convenient" and the United Service Gazette described it as "light, fits well to the head, produces an evenness of pressure and undeniably offers the best kind of protection against a bullet or sword cut". However the helmet proved unpopular when worn for strenuous activity and for such purposes the Kilmarnock cap was often worn.

The helmet was modified in 1865 as a result of lessons learnt from the Indian Mutiny and Crimean War. The resulting helmet, less ornamental than the original, has been retained by the Household Cavalry in full dress ever since.

The Albert helmet was also worn historically by a number of cavalry regiments in the Canadian Militia.

== Current wear ==
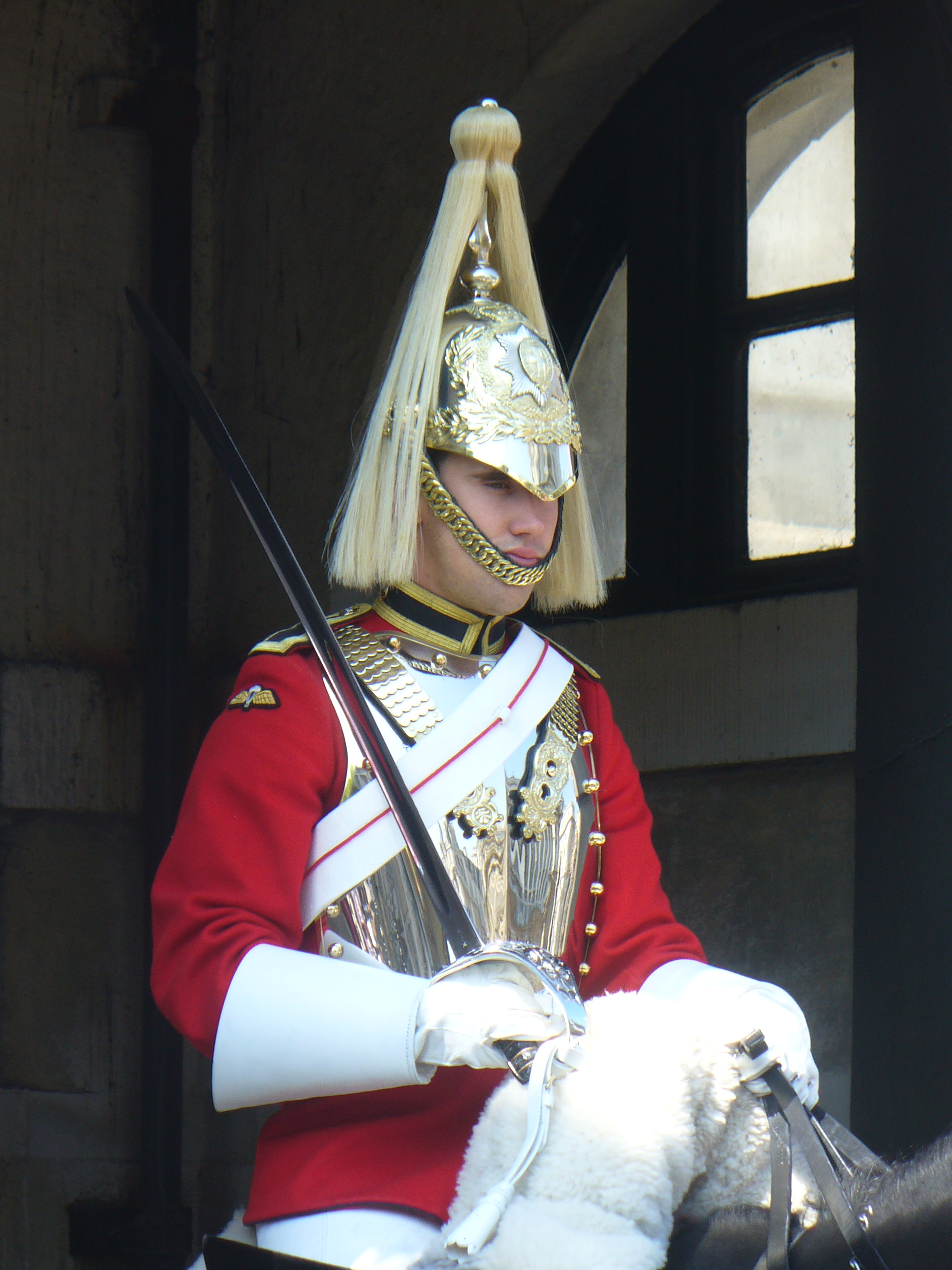
Trooper of the Life Guards

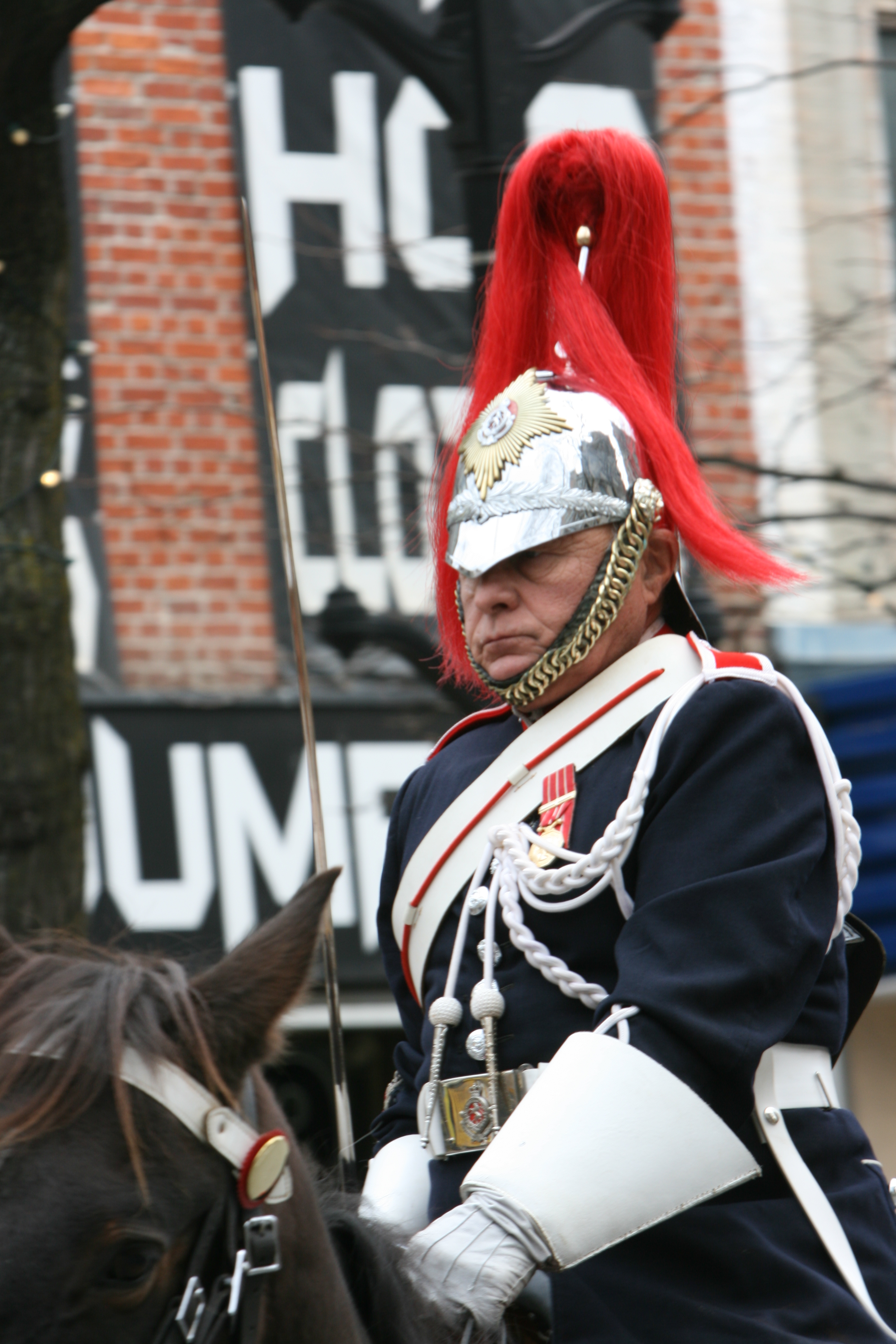
Trooper of the Governor General's Horse Guards

The Albert helmet remains in use with some British and Canadian units as a part of their full dress uniforms

The helmet remains in use with the two current Household Cavalry regiments, the Blues and Royals and the Life Guards. These regiments are amalgamations of the four earlier regiments. The Life Guards retain the white plume and the onion from the 2nd Regiment, the Blues and Royals retain the red plume of the Royal Horse Guards. The plume is 20 inches (51 cm) long and made from horsehair or nylon for other ranks in both regiments. For Life Guards officers the plume is of horsehair and measures 18 inches (46 cm), Blues and Royals officers wear a yak hair plume 17 inches (43 cm) long. Farriers in both regiments wear different plumes, the Life Guards wear black and Blues and Royals red.

The regiments also differ in how they wear the helmet's chin strap. The Blues and Royals wear it under the chin while the Life Guards wear it under the lower lip. The helmet is now in white metal for all ranks and the same helmet plate is worn by both regiments (they were different historically).

The Albert helmet is only worn in full dress review order, guard order and front yard order by other ranks and in full dress, levee dress and ceremonial rehearsal dress by officers. Medical and veterinary officers do not wear the helmet, instead wearing a cocked hat. The other ranks of the Mounted Band of the Household Cavalry wear the helmet in full dress (with the plumes of their parent regiments), except when parading in the presence of the royal family, when they wear state dress with jockey caps. Band officers wear Albert helmets on both occasions.

In the Canadian Army, the Albert helmet is currently worn with full dress by The Royal Canadian Dragoons, Lord Strathcona’s Horse and The Governor General's Horse Guards.
