= 4th Canadian Armoured Brigade =

Brigade of the Canadian Army

- 4th Canadian (Armoured) Division Formation Patch.
- Active: 1942–1944
- Country: Canada
- Branch: Canadian Army
- Type: Armoured warfare
- Size: Brigade

The 4th Canadian Armoured Brigade was an armoured brigade of the Canadian Army during World War II. It was part of the 4th Canadian (Armoured) Division.

== Organization ==
As of 1942 the 4th Canadian Armoured Brigade comprised:

- 21st Armoured Regiment (The Governor General's Foot Guards)
- 22nd Armoured Regiment (The Canadian Grenadier Guards)
- 28th Armoured Regiment (The British Columbia Regiment)
- 1st Battalion, The Lake Superior Regiment (Motor)

And their supporting units, including:

- 4th Canadian Brigade Company, Royal Canadian Army Service Corps;
- 12 Canadian Field Ambulance

Arriving in Normandy in July 1944, the brigade saw service in the battles that took the Canadians from Caen to Falaise (and the Falaise Pocket). Unlike their peers in the 2nd Canadian Armoured Brigade, the 4th Armoured Brigade almost always fought in support of its affiliated 10th Canadian Infantry Brigade.

Following the Normandy campaign the brigade saw service in Belgium, the Netherlands, and Germany before being disbanded in the Netherlands in 1946.

== Commanders ==
- E. L. M. Burns (1942–1943)
- Desmond Smith (1943–1944)
- Eric Leslie Booth (1944)
- Robert Moncel (1944–1946)
