= Billy Eagle =

Charles William Eagle
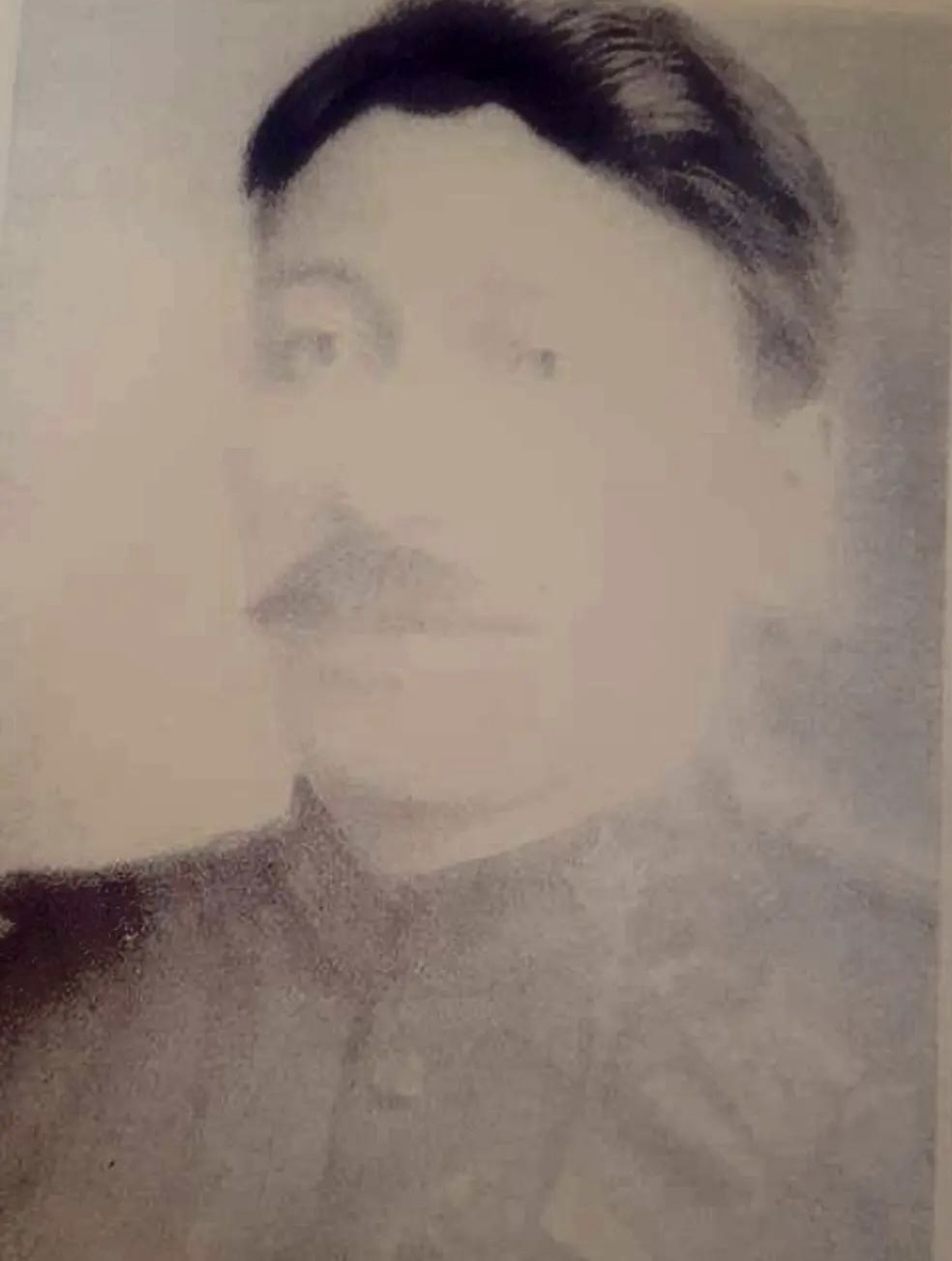
- Born: 1869; Canoe Creek, Cariboo, British Columbia
- Died: 10 October 1908 (aged 38–39); Makhado, Transvaal, South Africa
- Military career
- Allegiance: Canada; Transvaal Colony
- Branch: Canadian Army; South African Police
- Service years: 1902 - 1908
- Rank: Trooper; Constable
- Nickname: Billy Eagle
- Units: 5th Canadian Mounted Rifles; South African Constabulary
- Conflicts: Second Boer War

Charles William Eagle (1869 - October 10, 1908), also known as Billy Eagle, was a Canadian soldier who served as the only indigenous trooper in the South African Constabulary. Having previously served during the Boer War, he joined the SAC and while on a patrol in the Transvaal, he was famously attacked and mauled by a lion, dying from his injuries a month later.

== Background ==
Billy Eagle was born in 1869 in the Cariboo region of the Colony of British Columbia to Charles William Eagle Sr. and Anna Mary Tatqua. His father was an American cattle rancher and his mother was Secwépemc.

He was raised on his parents cattle ranch, the Onward Ranch, and in the 1880s, his father built one of the first non-log structures in the Cariboo region. He grew up hunting wild game, and became very good at riding and rifle shooting.

Billy Eagle married Rosa McLean on July 24, 1892, in Kamloops, British Columbia.

== Boer War ==
With the Boer War still raging in South Africa, Eagle enlisted as a volunteer in the 5th Canadian Mounted Rifles on April 25, 1902, in British Columbia. He served as a Trooper, No.213, and departed Halifax on May 23, bound for South Africa.

The regiment arrived on June 22, after peace was declared, and went into camp in Durban. Though they was no fighting to be done, the CMR assisted with the surrender of various Boer commandos and with patrolling the lines of blockhouses in the vicinity of Durban throughout June and July.

Eagle was described by a fellow trooper as an "eccentric character of unknown origins who never spoke of his past. Eagle was a powerful man, not of the heavy variety, but lithe. A well-read man, wonderful shot, excellent tracker and a superb horseman, and he revelled in the open life."

== South Africa ==
With the end of the war, there was a greater need for policemen than soldiers, and many veterans joined the South African Constabulary, using their military skills to patrol the wild veldt in the northern Transvaal. Eagle wanted to continue his adventure in South Africa and attempted to join the SAC. At first he was refused by the recruiting officer because of his dark complexation and his indigenous heritage, but 28 of his fellow soldiers refused to join unless Eagle was also allowed to join and eventually the officer relented.

Billy Eagle joined the SAC as a trooper on July 21, 1902, and was the only indigenous Canadian to serve in the South African Constabulary. Eagle was noted as having "outstanding hearing, eyesight and marksmanship" and had an ability to "sense danger long before anyone else could." A fellow trooper in the SAC commented that "None could ride as well as he could. None could spot a leopard when it lay in total camouflage in the dappled shadows of the bushveld."

His career with the Transvaal police was not without incident however, and he had several alcohol related charges placed against him. In one incident, he was charged as being "drunk on duty", but he pleaded his case, stating that he was suffering from the effects of malaria as a result of his patrols in the bush, explaining to the court that "I had just returned off a long hard patrol of 14 days, on which we had to live on rice, coffee and what meat we could shoot". Eventually his punishment was reduced to a small fine.

== Death ==
In September 1908, Billy Eagle was patrolling in the northern Transvaal near the Limpopo River when he learned from two other troopers about a pair of wounded lions in the area. He then rode to investigate and stumbled upon the lions which immediately leapt at him, knocking him from his horse. He shot and wounded both lions, but was bitten and badly clawed by one of them.

A local prospector managed to scare away the lions and carried Eagle off for help. After three days of riding, the badly wounded Eagle was brought to the hospital in Makhato, where he slipped into a coma and died a couple weeks later on October 10, 1908.

Billy Eagle was buried at Fort Edward, and a black granite monument was erected to his memory by his fellow officers in the SAC.

== Legacy ==
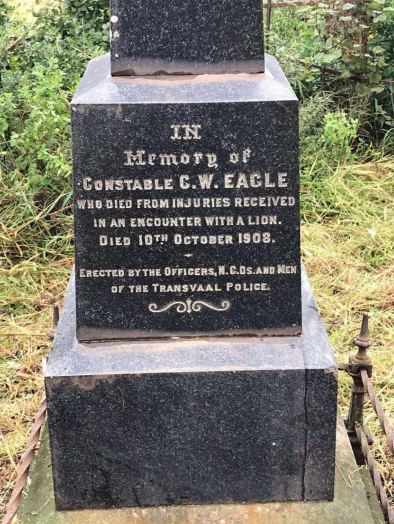
Grave of Billy Eagle, Fort Edward

His death was a local sensation in the Transvaal, and the local newspaper, the Zoutpansberg Review, wrote: "His wonderful intrepidity and tenacity is almost the sole topic of conversation in the Zoutpansberg, and his comrades of the Transvaal Police mourn the loss of one of the bravest men who ever donned the uniform."

Rhodesian/South African songwriter, John Edmond, wrote a song about him entitled Billy Eagle the Brave.
