= Leslie Booth =

Canadian Army officer (1904–1944)

Eric Leslie Booth DSO
- Born: April 21, 1904
- Died: August 14, 1944 (aged 40)
- Military career
- Allegiance: Canada
- Branch: Canadian Militia; Canadian Army
- Rank: Brigadier
- Units: The Mississauga Horse; 1st Hussars; 17th Lancers
- Commands: 12th Armoured Regiment (Three Rivers Regiment); 4th Canadian Armoured Brigade
- Conflicts: Second World War
- Awards: Distinguished Service Order & Bar; Canadian Efficiency Decoration

Brigadier Eric Leslie Booth, DSO & Bar, ED (April 21, 1904 – August 14, 1944) was a Canadian Army officer.

== Biography ==
Born in Lancaster, England, Leslie Booth was the son of John William Booth and Rose Elizabeth Booth. His father was a veteran of the First World War.

Booth was married to Mary Helen Booth of Penetanguishene, Ontario.

Joining the Canadian Militia in the peacetime years, Booth was an officer with The Mississauga Horse of Toronto and later the 2nd/10th Dragoons of Hamilton until the outbreak of war in 1939. Joining the 1st Hussars of London, he proceeded overseas where later he was attached to the British Army's 17th Lancers as the regiment's second-in-command and served in the North African Campaign under General Montgomery.

Rejoining the Canadian Army again in time for the Allied Invasion of Sicily, Booth was promoted to Lieutenant Colonel and given command of the 12th Armoured Regiment (Three Rivers Regiment). During the campaign he received the Distinguished Service Order. Booth would later receive a Bar to his DSO while commanding the regiment at the Battle of Ortona when while disregarding danger from sniper, shell and mortar fire, he went forward for reconnaissance and to direct and encourage the men of his regiment.

In 1944, Booth was recalled from Italy and given command of the 4th Canadian Armoured Brigade. During operations in Normandy on August 8, 1944, Major General George Kitching, unable to reach Booth by radio, found him drunk in his tank. Kitching severely reprimanded Booth, but did not remove him.

Booth was killed on August 14, when his tank was hit by German artillery during Operation Tractable. Brigadier Booth is buried at the Bretteville-sur-Laize Canadian War Cemetery.
