= Bantam microRNA =

bantam
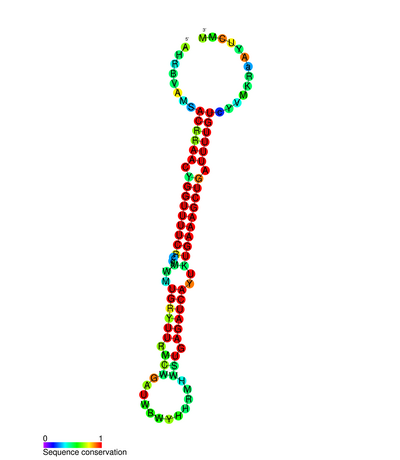
- A secondary structure and sequence conservation diagram for Bantam microRNA.

Identifiers
- Symbol: bantam
- Rfam: RF00727
- miRBase family: MIPF0000153

Other data
- RNA type: microRNA
- Domain: Eukaryota;
- PDB structures: PDBe

In molecular biology, bantam microRNA is a short RNA molecule. MicroRNAs function to regulate the expression levels of other genes by several mechanisms.

== Function ==
In Drosophila, bantam microRNA works in the epithelial cells where it regulates the growth of dendrites in sensory neurons. The Hippo signaling pathway also tends to be directly linked with the BANTAM microRNA as it regulates it to control the functionality of cell proliferation and survival. Recent studies show that human miRNA are also related to this pathway. Homothorax (Hth) and Teashirt (Tsh) are two DNA-binding transcription factors expressed in the Drosophila eye imaginal disc. Recent studies have shown that the Hth and Tsh which are found to be important in cell survival of the Drosophila anterior optimal disc participate in the regulation of the Bantam miRNA. It is concluded that the miRNA has an important function in the central pacemaker of the Drosophila circadian rhythm clock. To be more precise Bantam miRNA has an important relation with the clock component clk, thus making it an important factor of study regarding its role in Drosophila behavior.

== Diseases ==
Fragile X syndrome is implicated as being regulated by the FMRP, an RNA-binding protein. Studies on Drosophila have shown that the Bantam miRNA plays an important role in the regulation of the protein dFMRP and also genetically interacts with the protein in stem cell maintenance. This suggests the possibility of a relation between the miRNA and the disease. It is also suggested that the endogenous expression of the Bantam gene in the developing eye imaginal disc contributes to controlling the level of hid-induced apoptosis, which is normally involved in reducing cell number in the pupal eye disc.

== See also ==
- MicroRNA
