= Bantam Cider =

Hard cider company based in Somerville, Massachusetts

- Company type: Private
- Industry: Hard cider
- Founded: 2012
- Founders: Dana Masterpolo; Michelle da Silva
- Headquarters: Somerville, Massachusetts, United States
- Area served: Massachusetts, Maine, New Hampshire, Connecticut, New York, Illinois
- Products: Hard cider (including Wunderkind)
- Website: www.bantamcider.com

Bantam Cider was an independently owned, hard cider company located in Somerville, Massachusetts. They offered three varieties of bottled cider which ranged from 5.4% to 6.9% ABV. Bantam Cider was distributed throughout Massachusetts, Maine, New Hampshire, Connecticut, New York and Illinois.

== History ==
Bantam Cider, founded by Dana Masterpolo and Michelle da Silva in Cambridge, Massachusetts, launched its first product and flagship cider, Wunderkind, in January 2012. In 2013 Bantam Cider relocated to nearby Union Square in Somerville, Massachusetts with the establishment of its new production facility based in the old home of the White Rose Baking Company. In March 2014 Bantam Cider opened an on-premises all-cider taproom becoming the first of its kind, in Massachusetts.
