= Warwick W-3 Bantam =

W-3 Bantam

General information
- Type: Homebuilt aircraft
- National origin: United States
- Designer: Bill Warwick

History
- Introduction date: 1966
- First flight: June 1966

The W-3 Bantam is a simple single place, homebuilt aircraft design from Bill Warwick of Torrance, California.

== Design ==
The W-3 is a single place tricycle gear, low wing aircraft with an open cockpit or bubble canopy. Construction is all metal with a welded-steel-tube forward fuselage with attachment points for the wing spars and engine mount. The fuselage uses non-compound curves and features a square vertical stabilizer

== Operational history ==
The prototype was featured on the cover of the May 1972 issue of Popular Mechanics.

== Specifications (W-3 Bantam) ==
Data from Plane and Pilot

General characteristics

- Length: 13 ft 9 in (4.19 m)
- Wingspan: 18 ft 6 in (5.64 m)
- Empty weight: 535 lb (243 kg)
- Gross weight: 790 lb (358 kg)
- Fuel capacity: 11.5 U.S. gallons (44 L; 9.6 imp gal)
- Powerplant: 1 × Lycoming O-145B Horizontally Opposed Piston

Performance

- Maximum speed: 120 kn (140 mph, 230 km/h)
- Cruise speed: 100 kn (115 mph, 185 km/h)
- Stall speed: 45 kn (52 mph, 84 km/h)
- Rate of climb: 1,000 ft/min (5.1 m/s)
