= 216th Battalion (Bantams), CEF =

The 216th (Bantams) Battalion, CEF was a unit in the Canadian Expeditionary Force during the First World War. Based in Toronto, Ontario, the unit began recruiting in early 1916 throughout Military District 2. After sailing to England in April 1917, the battalion was absorbed into the 3rd Reserve Battalion on April 29, 1917. The 216th (Bantams) Battalion, CEF had one Officer Commanding: Lieut-Col. F. L. Burton.

The 216th Battalion is perpetuated by The Governor General's Horse Guards.
