= 8th Canadian Hussars (Princess Louise's) =

- Regimental cap badge
- Active: 4 April 1848–present
- Country: New Brunswick (1848–1867); Canada (1867–present)
- Branch: Canadian Army
- Type: Hussars
- Role: Armoured reconnaissance
- Part of: 37 Canadian Brigade Group
- Garrison/HQ: Moncton
- Nickname: The Crazy Eights
- Patron: Princess Louise, Duchess of Argyll
- Mottos: Regi patriaeque fidelis (Latin for 'Faithful to king and country')
- March: "The 8th Hussars"
- Engagements: First World War; Second World War; War in Afghanistan
- Battle honours: See #Battle honours

Commanders
- Colonel-in-chief: Anne, Princess Royal

Insignia
- Abbreviation: VIII CH
- NATO Map Symbol

The 8th Canadian Hussars (Princess Louise's) (VIII CH) is a reserve armoured reconnaissance regiment in the Canadian Army, with two squadrons. It was formed on 4 April 1848 in the then-colony of New Brunswick, which remains the regiment's home to this day, its regimental headquarters (RHQ) and A Squadron being in Moncton, with B Squadron in Sussex.

In 1957, its name was chosen for the formation of a new Regular Force regiment to serve alongside the reserve regiment. The regular regiment served in Gagetown, New Brunswick, and Petawawa, Ontario, as well as the Sinai, Cyprus, Iserlohn (Fort Beausejour), Soest, and Lahr, West Germany. The Regular Force regiment was disbanded in 1998.

== Structure ==
- HQ Squadron
- A Squadron in Moncton
- B Squadron in Sussex, New Brunswick

== Lineage ==
The Guidon of the 8th Canadian Hussars (Princess Louise's).

The camp flag of the 8th Canadian Hussars (Princess Louise's).

=== 8th Canadian Hussars (Princess Louise's) ===
- Originated on 30 April 1869, in Apohaqui, New Brunswick, as the New Brunswick Regiment of Yeomanry Cavalry
- Redesignated on 31 May 1872, as the 8th Regiment of Cavalry
- Redesignated on 18 July 1884, as the 8th Princess Louise's New Brunswick Regiment of Cavalry (named after Princess Louise, Marchioness of Lorne)
- Redesignated on 1 January 1893, as the 8th Princess Louise's New Brunswick Hussars
- Redesignated on 11 February 1941, as the 2nd (Reserve) Regiment, 8th Princess Louise's (New Brunswick) Hussars
- Redesignated on 1 April 1941, as the 5th (Reserve) Armoured Regiment, 8th Princess Louise's (New Brunswick) Hussars
- Redesignated on 4 February 1949, as the 8th Princess Louise's (New Brunswick) Hussars (5th Armoured Regiment)
- Redesignated on 29 January 1957, as the 2/8th Canadian Hussars (Princess Louise's)
- Redesignated on 1 January 1960, as the 8th Canadian Hussars (Princess Louise's) (Militia)
- Amalgamated on 15 April 1993, with the 8th Canadian Hussars (Princess Louise's) (Regular Force) and Redesignated as the 8th Canadian Hussars (Princess Louise's)

=== 8th Canadian Hussars (Princess Louise's) (Regular Force) ===
- Originated on 29 January 1957, in the Regular Force as the 1/8th Canadian Hussars (Princess Louise's)
- Redesignated on 1 January 1960, as the 8th Canadian Hussars (Princess Louise's)
- Amalgamated on 15 April 1993, with the 8th Canadian Hussars (Princess Louise's) (Militia) and Redesignated as the 8th Canadian Hussars (Princess Louise's)

=== Lineage chart ===
Lineage chart

1812	1st and 2nd Bn, Westmorland County Regt
1815	Disbanded
1848	The NB Yeomanry Cavy
1869	NB Regt of Yeomanry Cavy
1872	8th Regt of Cavy
1884	8th Princess Louise's NB Regt of Cavy
1893	8th "Princess Louise's NB Hussars"
1914	6th Regt, CMR, CEF
1916	Absorbed by 4th and 5th CMR Bn
1920	1st Regt, 8th Princess Louise's NB Hussars	2nd Regt, (Note: Reserve order of battle) 8th Princess Louise's NB Hussars
1936	8th Princess Louise's NB Hussars	Disbanded
1940	4th Canadian Motorcycle Regt, CASF (8 NBH)
1941	8th Princess Louise's (NB) Hussars, CAC, CASF	2nd (Reserve) Regt, 8th Princess Louise's (NB) Hussars
1941	5th Armd Regt (8th Princess Louise's (NB) Hussars), CASF	5th (Reserve) Armd Regt, 8th Princess Louise's (NB) Hussars
1943	5th Armd Regt (8th Princess Louise's (NB) Hussars), CAC, CASF
1945	5th Armd Regt (8th Princess Louise's (NB) Hussars), RCAC, CASF
1946	Disbanded
1949	8th Princess Louise's (NB) Hussars (5th Armd Regt)
1957	1/8th Canadian Hussars (Princess Louise's)	2/8th Canadian Hussars (Princess Louise's)
1960	8th Canadian Hussars (Princess Louise's)	8th Canadian Hussars (Princess Louise's) (Militia)
1960	Perpetuates 6th Regt	Perpetuates 6th Regt
1993	8th Canadian Hussars (Princess Louise's)
2012	Perpetuates War of 1812 units

== Perpetuations ==
=== War of 1812 ===
- 1st Battalion, Westmorland County Regiment
- 2nd Battalion, Westmorland County Regiment)

=== The Great War ===
- 6th Regiment, Canadian Mounted Rifles

== History ==
The earliest beginnings of the 8th Canadian Hussars (Princess Louise's) have traditionally been traced to the year 1775 in the Colony of Virginia where Captain John Saunders, of Princess Anne County, raised a troop of cavalry at his own expense to fight for the Crown against the Colonial rebels. This unusual Regiment included riflemen, grenadiers, artillery and cavalry, and it never knew defeat during the American conflict for independence. In September 1783, the Regiment as an entity sailed for Nova Scotia and reached Saint John on 27 September 1783. A large number of these Loyalists soldiers settled in the Saint John and Kennebecasis valleys by Loyalist soldiers, had a military tradition and indeed an effective militia. In 1839, the York County Troop, known for a time as the York Light Dragoons, was mobilized for service in the Aroostook War, a conflict with American lumbermen that never quite came to open fighting. For four months they patrolled the border and roads between Woodstock, Fredericton and Saint John. By 1848, eleven troops of cavalry were in existence. These troops included Hampton Troop of Cavalry, Assekeag Troop of Cavalry, Apohaqui Troop of Cavalry, Upham Troop of Cavalry, Johnston Troop of Cavalry, Shediac Troop of Cavalry, Springfield Troop of Cavalry, among others.

By authority of Militia General Order No 1 of 4 April 1848, these eleven independent troops were united to form a regiment entitled the New Brunswick Yeomanry Cavalry. In 1972 the Canadian Armed Forces recognized this date as the official formation date of the regiment, but later rescinded this decision, citing the fact that the regiment did not meet the legally established deadline when re-enrolling in the Canadian Militia after Confederation. Under this interpretation, the regiment's official seniority date was 30 April 1869. However, in 2023, the Canadian Forces again recognized the establishment date of 4 April 1848.

=== South African War ===
The regiment contributed volunteers for the Canadian Contingents that served in South Africa.

=== Great War ===
The 6th Regiment, Canadian Mounted Rifles, CEF, was authorized on 7 November 1914 and embarked for England on 17 July 1915. It disembarked in France on 24 October 1915, where it continued to train until 2 January 1916 when its personnel were absorbed by the 4th Battalion, Canadian Mounted Rifles and the 5th Battalion, Canadian Mounted Rifles, CEF. The regiment disbanded on 18 February 1918. Starting in 1920, the 6th Regiment was perpetuated by the King's Canadian Hussars, which was converted to an artillery unit in 1939. Perpetuation of the 6th Regiment was reassigned in 1960 to the 8th Canadian Hussars.

=== Second World War ===
The Second World War provided the regiment's first opportunity for active service as a formed unit. The regiment mobilized as the 4th Canadian Motorcycle Regiment, CASF (8 NBH) on 24 May 1940. It was converted to armour and redesignated as the "8th Princess Louise's (New Brunswick) Hussars) CAC, CASF", on 9 February 1941; as the 5th Armoured Regiment (8th Princess Louise's (New Brunswick) Hussars, CASF, on 11 February 1941. The regiment embarked for Britain on 9 October 1941

The regiment landed in Italy on 19 December 1943 as a unit of the 5th Armoured Brigade, 5th Canadian Armoured Division. It was renamed as the "5th Armoured Regiment (8th Princess Louise's (New Brunswick) Hussars, CAC, CASF", on 15 October 1943. The regiment landed in Italy on 19 December 1943 at Naples and saw action soon and frequently thereafter. The regiment fought in the Liri Valley, the Melfa Crossing, Ceprano, The Gothic Line, Missano Ridge, Coriano, the Lamone River Crossing, and Coventello where it distinguished itself.

It began moving secretly to North-West Europe on 17 February 1945 as part of Operation Goldflake. The Hussars sailed from Italy to Southern France, and then moved by rail to Northwest Europe. After refitting the tanks, the regiment went into action in the Netherlands, breaking through to Putten in mid-April. The regiment then moved north for the final actions of the war at the Delfzijl Pocket, where 3,000 German soldiers surrendered to the regiment. It was renamed as the "5th Armoured Regiment (8th Princess Louise's (New Brunswick) Hussars, RCAC, CASF", on 2 August 1945.

On 26 January 1946, the regiment arrived in Halifax and the next day reached Sussex, New Brunswick where it was demobilized. The overseas regiment disbanded on 15 February 1946.

=== Post World War II ===
In 1950, the regiment was called upon to provide men for service with the Special Force which was raised and deployed to Korea, and in 1951 "Y" Troop was organized for service with the 27th Canadian Infantry Brigade in Germany.

On 29 January 1957, it was decided that a third Regular armoured regiment would be formed in the Canadian Army. As a result, the regiment was honoured with the privilege of providing its name to the new regiment. This resulted in the change of the regiment's name to the 8th Canadian Hussars (Princess Louise's). The Regular regiment served in Gagetown, New Brunswick, Petawawa, Ontario, the Sinai, Cyprus, Iserlohn (Fort Beauséjour), Soest and Lahr, West Germany.

Corporal Paul R. Wallace and Trooper Adrian A. Bons died while deployed to the Sinai as part of the United Nations Emergency Force on 27 November 1964.

In the summer of 1965, the regiment was deployed from their base at Petawawa, Ontario, on a peacekeeping mission for the United Nations to the island nation of Cyprus. Trooper Lennard W. Nass died on 27 September 1966 while deployed to Cyprus as part of the United Nations Force in Cyprus.

The regiment has participated in several missions in aid to the civil authority. In the summer of 1990 the regiment sent a troop-sized force to the province of Quebec in Cougars to assist in Canadian Forces operations in the Oka Crisis. In the 1998 Ice Storm, the regiment provided a platoon-sized force to assist in the maintenance of infrastructure in the community of St. George, New Brunswick. In the fall of 1998, the regiment provided soldiers to the recovery effort for Swissair Flight 111.

In 2004, 8CH became an armoured reconnaissance unit, in place of its previous designation as simply an armoured unit. Along with this trade change the unit was given the new Mercedes-Benz G-Wagen, a Jeep-like vehicle more suited to their new role as reconnaissance. The unit is stationed at the Moncton and Sussex detachments of CFB Gagetown, New Brunswick. Its colonel-in-chief is The Princess Royal.

=== War in Afghanistan ===
The regiment contributed an aggregate of more than 20% of its authorized strength to the various Task Forces which served in Afghanistan between 2002 and 2014.

== Organization ==
=== New Brunswick Regiment of Yeomanry Cavalry (30 April 1869) ===
- No. 1 Troop (Hampton, NB) (first formed on 3 January 1866 as the Hampton Troop of Cavalry)
- No. 2 Troop (Assekeag, NB) (first raised on 30 November 1864 as the Assekeag Troop of Cavalry)
- No. 3 Troop (Apohaqui, NB) (first raised on 3 January 1866 as the Apohaqui Troop of Cavalry)
- No. 4 Troop (Upham, NB) (first raised on 3 January 1866 as the Upham Troop of Cavalry)
- No. 5 Troop (Johnston, NB) (first raised on 28 February 1866 as the Johnston Troop of Cavalry)
- No. 6 Troop (Shediac, NB) (first raised on 13 June 1866 as the Shediac Troop of Cavalry)
- No. 7 Troop (Springfield, NB) (first raised on 21 June 1865 as the Springfield Troop of Cavalry)

=== 8th Princess Louise's New Brunswick Hussars (1920) ===
- Regimental Headquarters (Hampton, NB)
- A Squadron (Sussex, NB)
- B Squadron (Springfield, NB)
- C Squadron (Sackville, NB)

=== 8th Canadian Hussars (Princess Louise's) (1993) ===
- Regimental Headquarters (Moncton, NB)
- HQ Squadron (Moncton, NB)
- A Squadron (CFB Gagetown)
- B Squadron (Sussex, NB)
- C Squadron (Sackville, NB)

== Alliances ==
- United Kingdom - The Queen's Royal Hussars (Queen's Own and Royal Irish)
- United Kingdom - Yorkshire Yeomanry

== Battle honours ==
In the list below, battle honours in capitals were awarded for participation in large operations and campaigns, while those in lowercase indicate honours granted for more specific battles. Those battle honours followed by a "+" are emblazoned on the regimental guidon.

The Guidon of the 8th Canadian Hussars (Princess Louise's).

=== The War of 1812 ===
- Honorary Distinction: the non-emblazonable honorary distinction DEFENCE OF CANADA – 1812-1815 – DÉFENSE DU CANADA.

=== The Great War ===
- MOUNT SORREL 2–13 June 1916+
- SOMME, 1916 1 July-18 November 1916+
- FRANCE AND FLANDERS, 1915-16+)

=== The Second World War ===
- LIRI VALLEY 18–30 May 1944
- Melfa Crossing 24–25 May 1944
- Ceprano 26–27 May 1944
- GOTHIC LINE 25 August-22 September 1944
- Montecchio 30–31 August 1944
- Tomba di Pesaro 1–2 September 1944
- LAMONE CROSSING 2–13 September 1944
- Coriano 3–15 September 1944
- Misano Ridge
- Conventello-Comacchio 2–6 January 1945
- ITALY, 1944-1945
- IJsselmeer 15–18 April 1945
- Delfzijl Pocket 23 April-2 May 1945
- NORTH-WEST EUROPE, 1945

=== Afghanistan ===
Afghanistan

== 8th Hussars Regimental Museum ==
8th Canadian Hussars (Princess Louise's) Museum
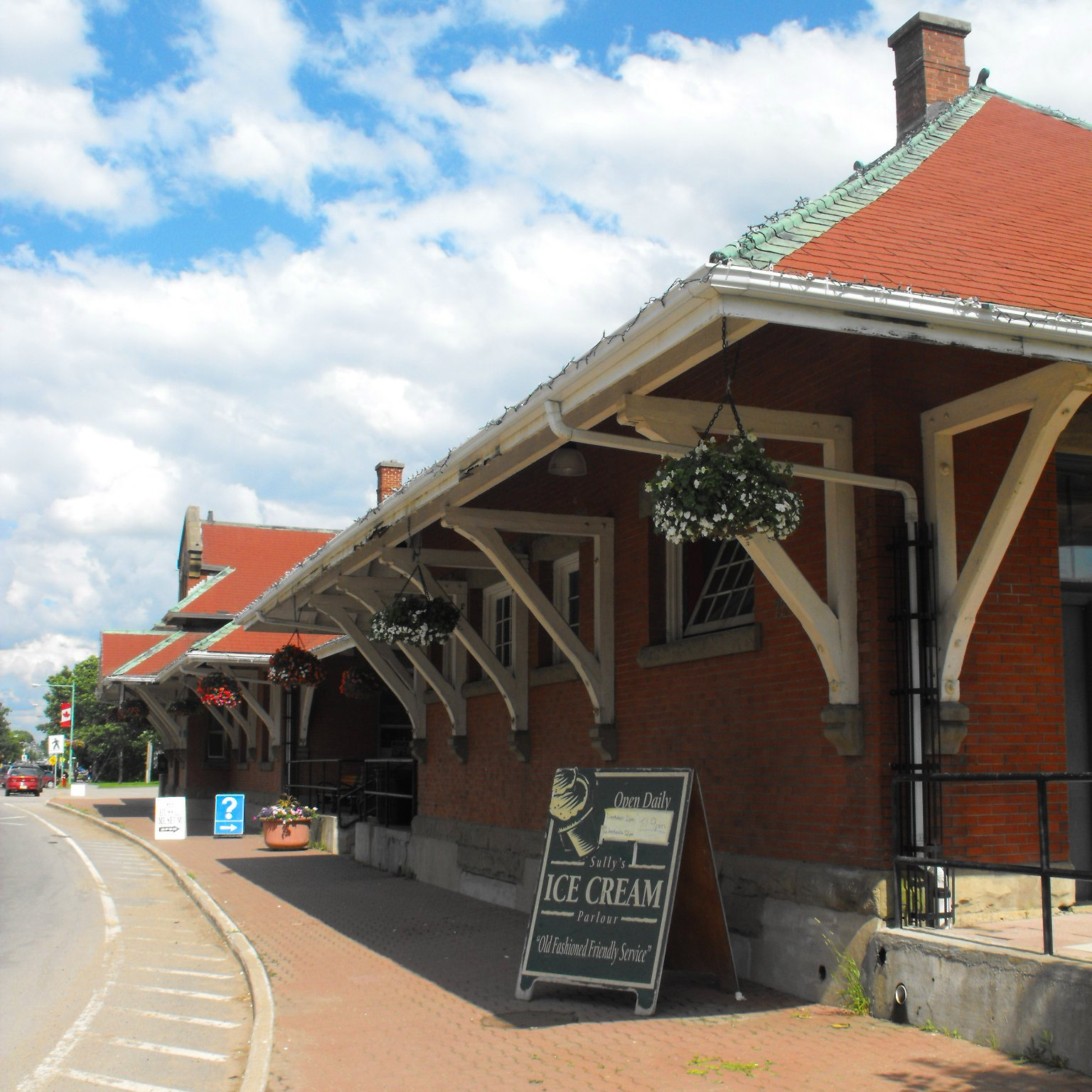
- Location: former train station in Sussex, New Brunswick Kings New Brunswick
- Coordinates: 45.7225°N 65.5128°W
- Website: 8th Hussars Regimental Museum

The regiment's museum is in a former train station in Sussex, New Brunswick. Exhibits focus on the 8th Canadian Hussars (Princess Louise's) military history and activities, and include uniforms, medals, weapons and artifacts from different wars.

== See also ==
- List of regiments of cavalry of the Canadian Militia (1900–1920)
- The Canadian Crown and the Canadian Forces

== Notes and references ==
- https://web.archive.org/web/20070426034135/http://www.8chassociation.com/Regiment1.html
- A-DH-267-003 Insignia and Lineages of the Canadian Forces, Volume 3: Part 1 Armour, Artillery and Field Engineer Regiments, Canadian Forces, 9 November 2004

Preceded by The Halifax Rifles (RCAC)	8th Canadian Hussars (Princess Louise's)	Succeeded by Ontario Regiment
