= King's Canadian Hussars =

The King's Canadian Hussars
- Active: 1874–1939
- Country: Canada
- Branch: Canadian Militia
- Type: Hussars
- Role: Cavalry; Armoured car
- Size: Independent cavalry troop (1874–1903); One regiment (1903–1939)
- Part of: Non-Permanent Active Militia
- Garrison/HQ: Kentville, Nova Scotia
- Motto: Vota vita mia
- Engagements: South African War; First World War
- Battle honours: See #Battle honours

The King's Canadian Hussars were a cavalry regiment of the Non-Permanent Active Militia of the Canadian Militia (now the Canadian Army). In August 1939, the regiment was converted to artillery and currently exists today as the 87th Field Battery, RCA.

== Lineage ==
- Originated on 12 June 1874 in Kentville, Nova Scotia as the King's Canadian Hussars.
- Organized on 1 December 1903 as a full regiment.
- Reorganized on 1 April 1904 as the 14th King's Canadian Hussars.
- Redesignated on 15 March 1920 as The King's (Nova Scotia) Mounted Rifles.
- Redesignated on 1 December 1925 as the King's Canadian Hussars.
- Amalgamated on 1 December 1936 with C Company of The Colchester and Hants Regiment and B Company of the 6th Machine Gun Battalion, CMGC, and redesignated as the King's Canadian Hussars (Armoured Car).
- Converted on 1 August 1939, from light armour to artillery and formed the 87th Field Battery, RCA and the 88th Field Battery, RCA.

== Perpetuations ==
=== Great War ===
- 6th Regiment, Canadian Mounted Rifles

The King's Canadian Hussars were first granted the perpetuation of the 6th Regiment, Canadian Mounted Rifles after the First World War. After the regiment was converted to artillery in 1939, the perpetuation was continued by the 8th Canadian Hussars (Princess Louise's) that continues this to the present day.

== History ==
=== King's Canadian Hussars ===
==== Early history ====
The King's Canadian Hussars were first authorized on 12 June 1874. After expansion to squadron strength in 1897, a number of soldiers of the regiment volunteered for the Boer War two years later. Major Harold Lithrop Borden, son of Minister of Militia Frederick William Borden, commanded the squadron and accepted a reduction in rank to lieutenant in order to serve overseas with the Second Canadian Contingent. He was killed in action with the Canadian Mounted Rifles on 16 July 1900.

On 1 December 1903, the Hussars were organized as a full regiment.

They were reorganized on 1 April 1904 as the 14th King's Canadian Hussars.

==== First World War ====
On 7 November 1914, the 6th Regiment, Canadian Mounted Rifles was authorized, and on 17 July 1915, the regiment embarked for the United Kingdom. On 24 October 1915, the 6th Regiment, CMR, disembarked in France where it continued to train until early 1916. On 2 January 1916, the Canadian Mounted Rifles regiments were converted to infantry and the personnel from the 6th CMR were absorbed by the 4th Battalion, Canadian Mounted Rifles, and 5th Battalion, Canadian Mounted Rifles, of the 8th Canadian Infantry Brigade, 3rd Canadian Division. On 18 February 1918, the 6th Regiment, CMR, was disbanded.

==== 1920s–1930s ====
On 15 March 1920, as a result of the post-war Canadian Militia reforms following the Otter Commission, the 14th King's Canadian Hussars were redesignated as The King's (Nova Scotia) Mounted Rifles.

On 1 December 1925, they were again redesignated as the King's Canadian Hussars.

On 1 December 1936, as part of the 1936 Canadian Militia reorganization, the King's Canadian Hussars were amalgamated with "C" Company of The Colchester and Hants Regiment and "B" Company of the 6th Machine Gun Battalion, CMGC, and redesignated as the King's Canadian Hussars (Armoured Car).

On 15 August 1939, the King's Canadian Hussars were converted from light armour to artillery and became the 87th Field Battery, RCA and the 88th Field Battery, RCA respectively.

=== 87th Field Battery, RCA ===
==== Second World War ====
First serving as part of the 14th Field Artillery Regiment, RCA, the 87th Field Battery was placed on active service and on 26 January 1942, became the 87th Medium Battery, part of the 3rd Medium Regiment, RCA.

After first serving in England with the I Canadian Corps, the 87th Medium Battery along with the rest of the 3rd Medium Regiment were transferred to the II Canadian Corps and served in Northwest Europe until later being assigned to the Artillery Group of the First Canadian Army.

On 16 November 1945, The 87th Medium Battery was disbanded and the 87th Field Battery returned to being a reserve unit.

==== Post-war ====
After having served as a reserve anti-aircraft battery in Dartmouth since 1946, on 1 November 1960, the 87th Battery was again converted back to field artillery under the name 87th Field Battery, RCA and assigned to the 1st (Halifax-Dartmouth) Field Artillery Regiment, RCA.

== Battle honours ==
- Mount Sorrell
- Somme, 1916
- France and Flanders, 1915–16

== Notable members ==
- Major Harold Lothrop Borden

== See also ==
- List of regiments of cavalry of the Canadian Militia (1900–1920)
