= 4th Battalion, Canadian Mounted Rifles =

- The distinguishing patch of the 4th Battalion, Canadian Mounted Rifles, CEF.
- Active: 1914 - 1918
- Country: Canada
- Branch: Canadian Expeditionary Force
- Type: Mounted Infantry
- Role: Mounted Infantry, Infantry
- Size: One Battalion
- Part of: 8th Canadian Infantry Brigade

The 4th Battalion, Canadian Mounted Rifles was authorized on 7 November 1914 as the 4th Regiment, Canadian Mounted Rifles, CEF and embarked for Britain on 18 July 1915. It disembarked in France on 24 October 1915, where it fought as part of the 2nd Brigade Canadian Mounted Rifles until 31 December 1915, when it was converted to infantry and allocated to the 8th Canadian Infantry Brigade, 3rd Canadian Division. The regiment was redesignated the 4th Battalion, Canadian Mounted Rifles, CEF on 1 January 1916 and was disbanded on 6 November 1920.

== History ==
The battalion recruited in Militia District 2 in Ontario and was mobilized at Toronto, Ontario. Most of their recruits came from the militia cavalry regiments from Militia District 2: The Governor General's Body Guard, the 2nd Dragoons, the 9th Mississauga Horse and the 25th Brant Dragoons.

The battalion had four Officers Commanding:

- Lt.-Col. S. F. Smith, 18 July 1915 – 6 March 1916
- Lt.-Col. J. F. H. Ussher, 6 March 1916 – 3 June 1916
- Lt.-Col. H. D. L. Gordon, DSO, 7 June 1916 – 27 May 1917
- Lt.-Col. W. R. Patterson, DSO, 28 May 1917-Demobilization

== Victoria Cross ==
One member of the battalion, Pte Thomas William Holmes, was awarded the Victoria Cross for his actions on 26 October 1917 during the Battle of Passchendaele. Pte Holmes, then 19, is Canada's youngest Victoria Cross recipient.

== Perpetuations ==
The 4th Battalion, Canadian mounted rifles is perpetuated by The Governor General's Horse Guards.

== Battle honours ==
The battalion was awarded the following battle honours:

- MOUNT SORREL
- SOMME, 1916
- FLERS-COURCELETTE
- Ancre heights
- ARRAS, 1917, '18
- VIMY, 1917
- Hill 70
- YPRES, 1917
- PASSCHENDAELE
- AMIENS
- Scarpe, 1918
- Hindenburg Line
- Canal du Nord
- CAMBRAI, 1918
- Valenciennes
- Sambre
- FRANCE and FLANDERS, 1915-18

== See also ==
- List of mounted regiments in the Canadian Expeditionary Force
- List of infantry battalions in the Canadian Expeditionary Force
