= The Armoury (New Westminster) =

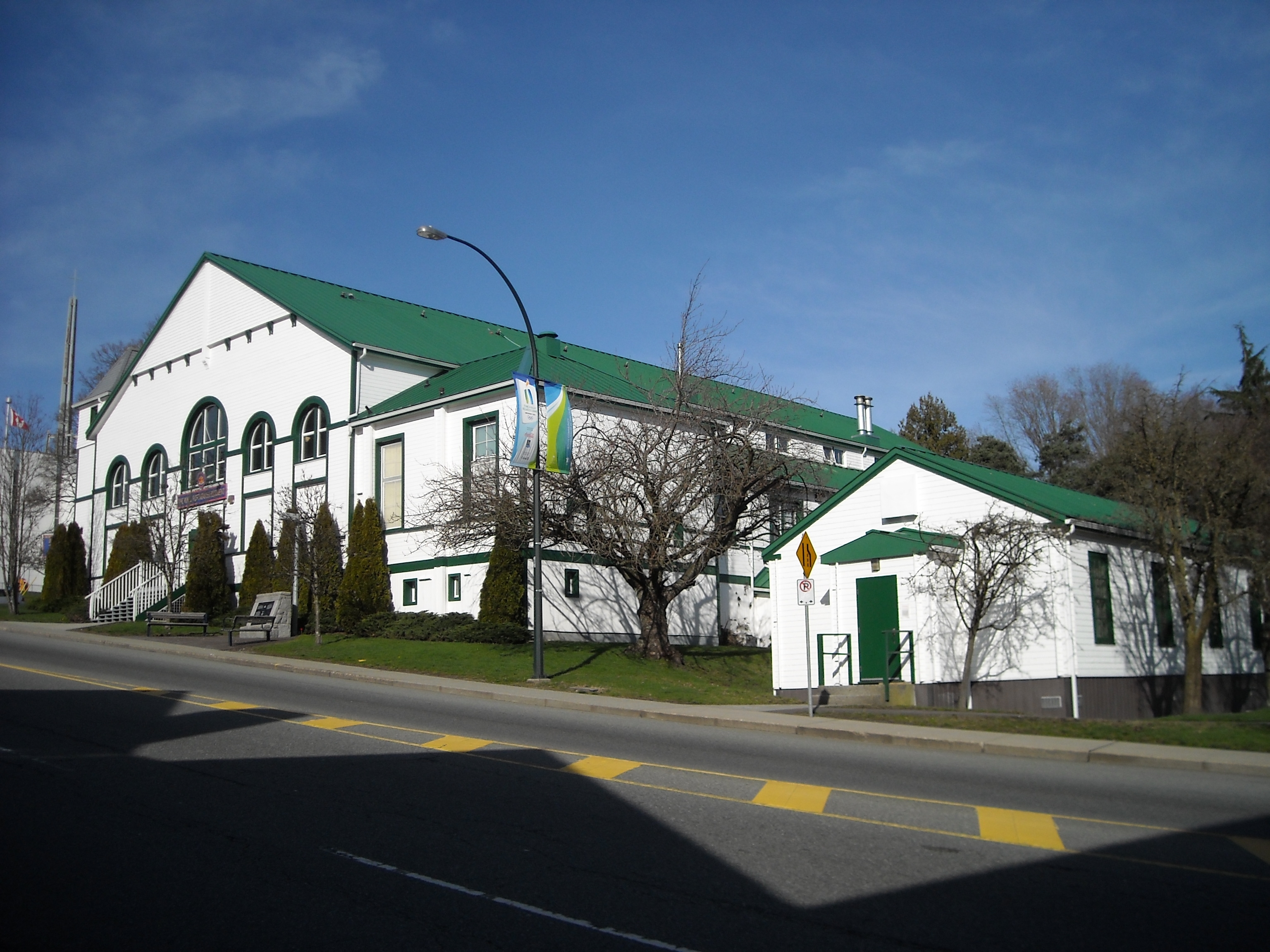
- The Armoury
- Interactive map of the The Armoury area

General information
- Type: Drill Hall / armoury
- Location: New Westminster, British Columbia, 530 Queens Avenue
- Coordinates: 49°12′26″N 122°54′44″W
- Current tenants: The Royal Westminster Regiment
- Inaugurated: 1896
- Renovated: 1898 (gun room)
- Owner: Canadian Armed Forces

Technical details
- Floor count: 3
- Floor area: 1,400 square feet

Design and construction
- Architect: Thomas Fuller
- Structural engineer: David Bain

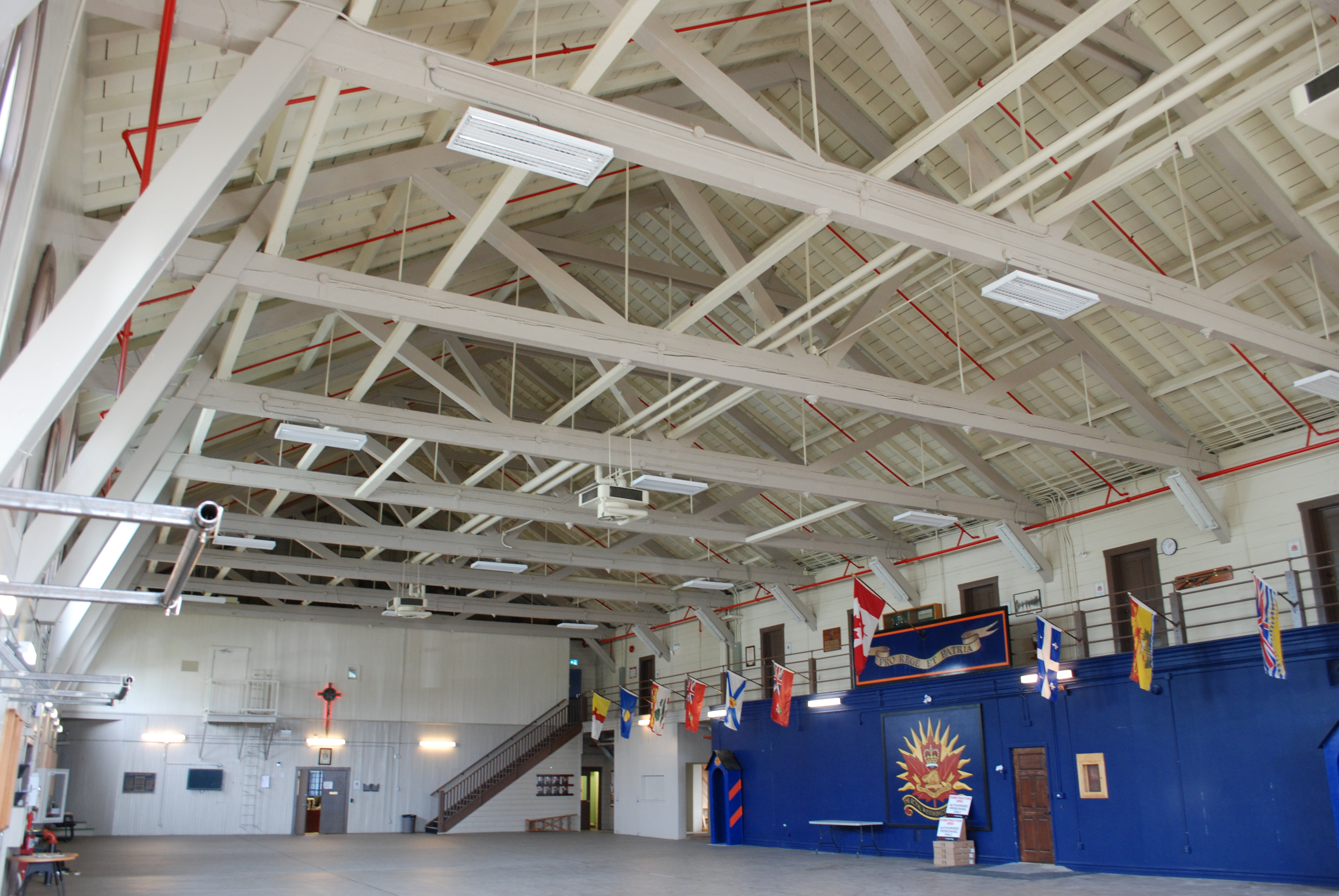
Parade square

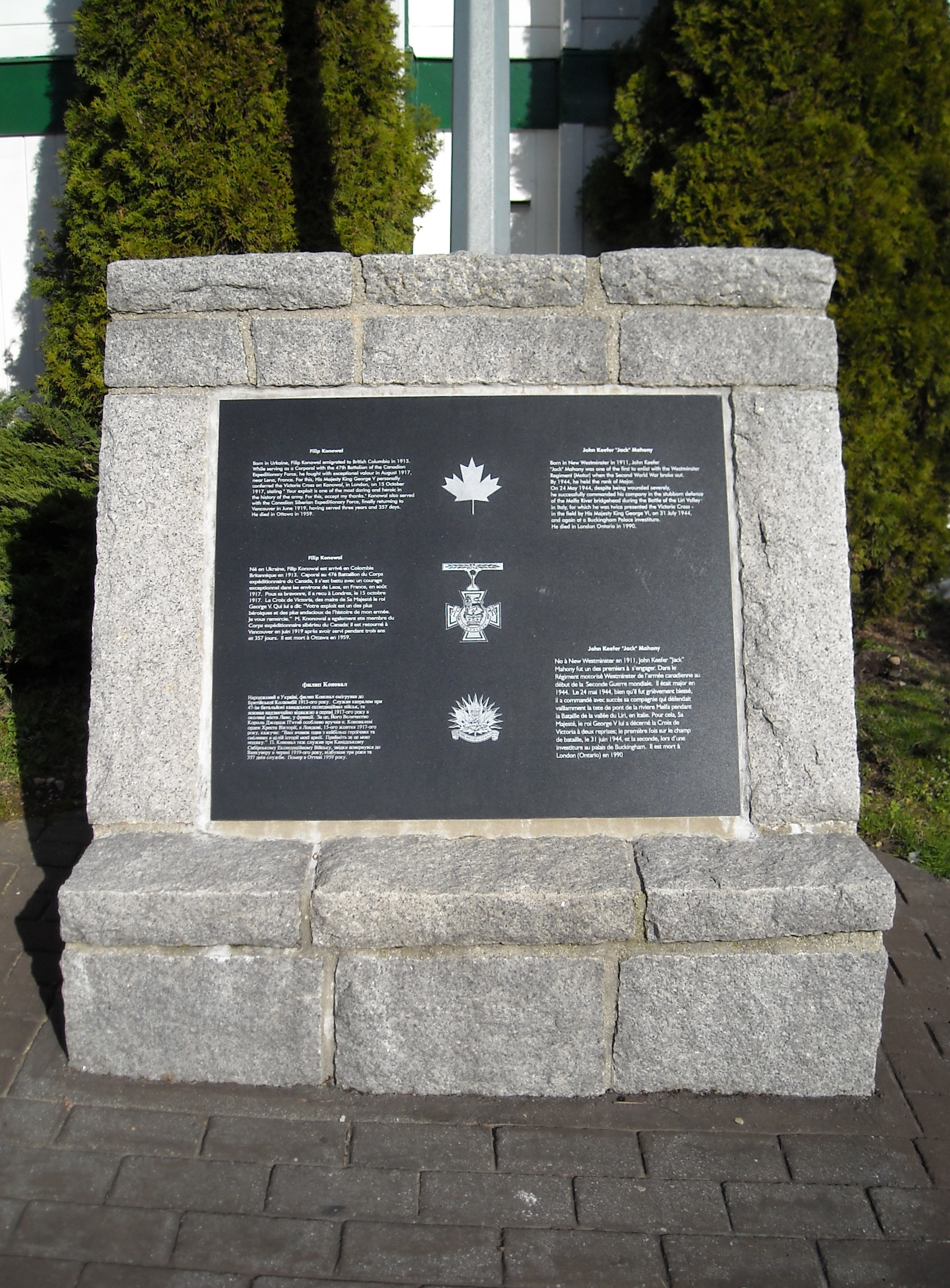
Victoria Cross memorial

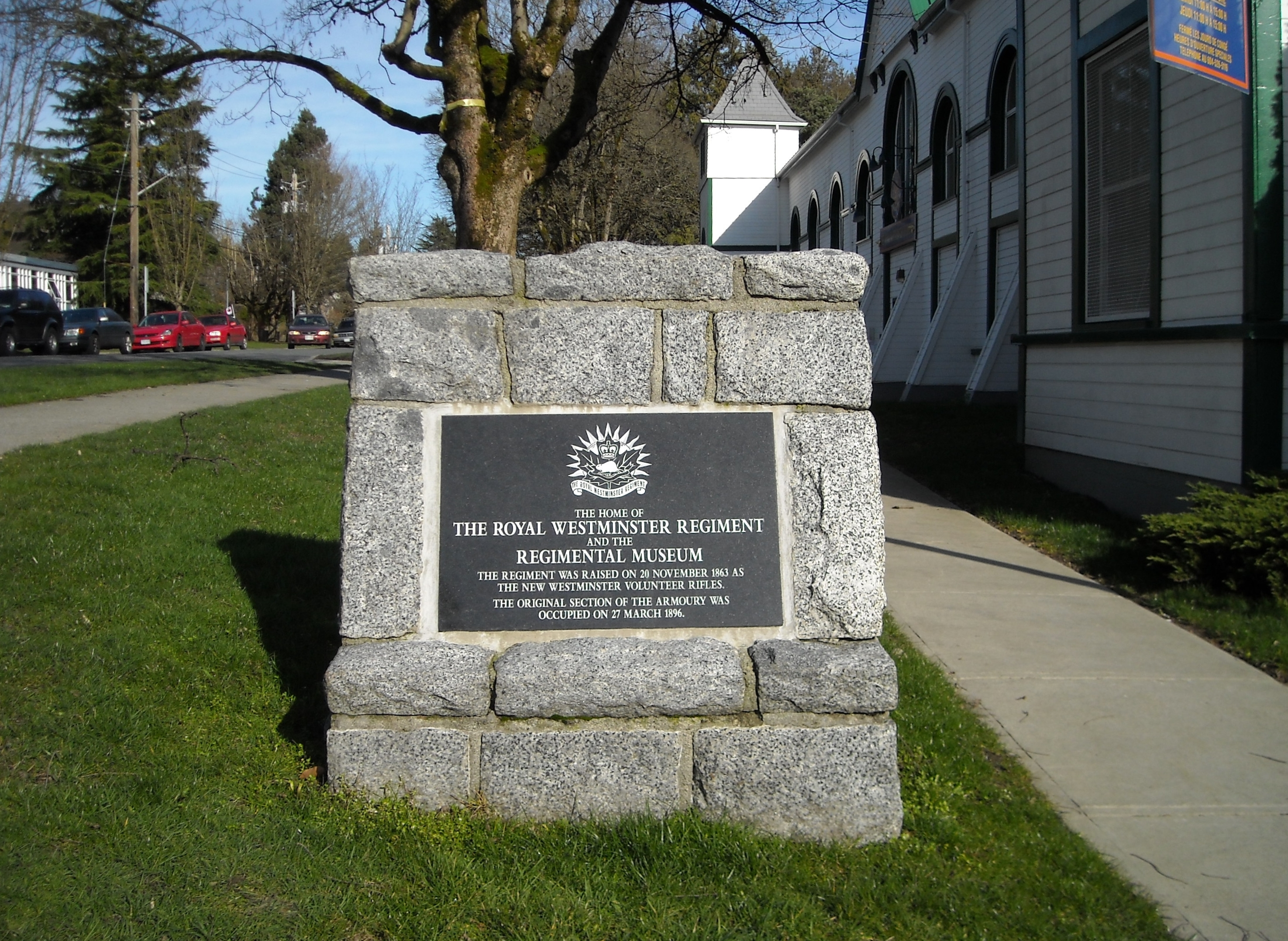
Regimental cairn

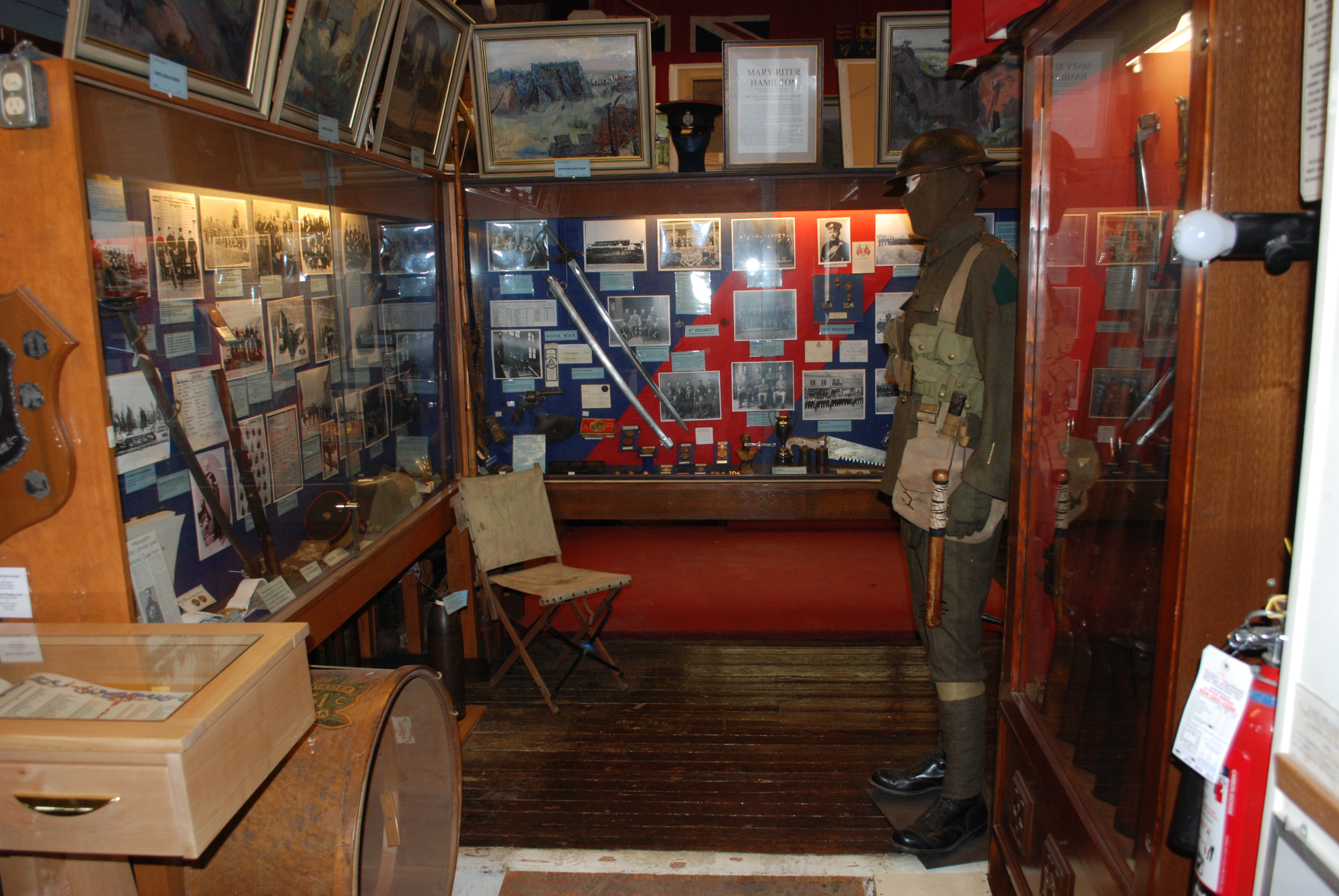
Entrance to the museum

The Armoury also called The Armouries is a Canadian Forces armoury located at 530 Queens Avenue (at the corner of 6th Street) in New Westminster, British Columbia and it is the oldest active wooden military structure in Canada. It is the home of The Royal Westminster Regiment, an infantry reserve regiment.

== Architecture ==
The wooden structure was one of the few buildings to survive the great fire of 1898. Although it was a single structure it is referred to as "The Armouries" by members of The Royal Westminster Regiment. In 1895 contractor David Bain, using designs of Thomas Fuller, began construction on the site. The building was completed in 1896 but would still require the completion of the Gun Room in 1898. In addition to the parade square the building houses the Regimental Museum, offices, quartermaster store room, Officers' Mess and Warrants' and Sergeants' Mess (the Junior Ranks' Mess is housed in the adjoining building). It formerly housed a firing range in the basement and was eventually replaced with a Small Arms Training (SAT range) in a second building on the site. The building is a Recognized Federal Heritage Building.

The founding of the original Westminster Volunteer Rifles dates back to 20 November 1863. The Armouries served as the headquarters for the subsequent Regiments throughout the Great War and World War II. During the fighting in Italy the men of the Westminster Regiment (M.G.) saw more continuous combat than any other Canadian fighting unit. In recognition of outstanding service the title "Royal" was given to the Regiment in 1966 by Queen Elizabeth.

== Memorials ==
Two stone cairns were erected on 6th Street in front of The Armouries dedicated with a copper plaque. The monument next to the 6th Street doors is to the memory of the Regiment's Victoria Cross recipients, Major John Keefer Mahony and Acting Corporal Filip Konowal. The monument on the corner of Queens and 6th is dedicated to The Royal Westminster Regiment. The copper plaques were stolen from the cairns by metal thieves and were eventually replaced with marble carvings.

One of the original artillery pieces from The Armouries, RML 64-pounder 71-cwt Gun, mounted on a riveted iron carriage. The gun is from the lower deck of a British Man of War, from redundant stores of the Royal Navy Dockyard sent to Victoria, in 1895. It stands to the right side of Queen's Avenue entrance. The most recent addition is the Universal Carrier (often referred to as a Bren Gun Carrier) which is mounted the left side of the Queens Avenue entrance.

== Museum ==
The Royal Westminster Regimental Museum is located in what was the original Gun Room. The a committee was organized in 1969 and the museum opened on 15 April 1973. The museum preserves the legacies of the military units that have served in New Westminster over the century. These units include the Westminster Volunteer Rifles, the Seymour Battery of Garrison Artillery, the 104th Westminster Fusiliers of Canada, the 47th and 131st Battalions CEF, the Westminster Regiment and The Royal Westminster Regiment. The military displays date back to 1863 include uniforms, medals, weapons and photographs documenting the history.

== See also ==
- List of Armouries in Canada
