= 131st Battalion (Westminster), CEF =

The 131st Battalion, CEF was a unit in the Canadian Expeditionary Force during the First World War. Based in New Westminster, British Columbia, the unit began recruiting in late 1915 in that city. After sailing to England in November 1916, the battalion was absorbed into the 30th Battalion, CEF on November 14, 1916. The 131st Battalion, CEF had one Officer Commanding: Lieut-Col. James Davis Taylor.

The battalion is perpetuated by the Royal Westminster Regiment.
