= Royal Westminster Regiment =

Military unit of the Canadian Armed Forces

The Royal Westminster Regiment
- Active: 1910–present
- Country: Canada
- Branch: Canadian Army
- Type: Infantry
- Part of: 39 Canadian Brigade Group
- Garrison/HQ: RHQ, New Westminster; A Coy, New Westminster; D Coy, Chilliwack
- Nickname: "The Westies"
- Mottos: Pro rege et patria (Latin: "For king and country")
- March: "The Maple Leaf Forever"
- Anniversaries: 20 November (Regimental Birthday); 25 May (Melfa Crossing)
- Engagements: First World War; Second World War; War in Afghanistan
- Battle honours: Battle honours: Mount Sorrel; Somme, 1916; Ancre Heights; Ancre, 1916; Arras, 1917, '18; Vimy, 1917; Hill 70; Ypres, 1917; Passchendaele; Amiens; Scarpe, 1918; Drocourt–Quéant; Hindenburg Line; Canal du Nord; Valenciennes; France and Flanders, 1916–18; Liri Valley; Melfa Crossing; Gothic Line; Coriano; Lamone Crossing; Misano Ridge; Casale; Naviglio Canal; Italy, 1944–1945; IJsselmeer; Delfzijl Pocket; North-West Europe, 1945; Afghanistan
- Website: canada.ca/en/army/corporate/3-canadian-division/the-royal-westminster-regiment.html

Commanders
- Commanding officer: LCol Clint Uttley
- Regimental Sergeant Major: CWO Dean Baron, CD
- Abbreviation: R Westmr R

The Royal Westminster Regiment (commonly referred to as the Westies) is a Primary Reserve infantry regiment of the Canadian Army. It is currently part of the 3rd Canadian Division's 39 Canadian Brigade Group and is based in New Westminster, British Columbia, at The Armoury and at Colonel Roger Kenwood St. John, OMM, CD Armoury in Chilliwack, British Columbia.

== Lineage ==
=== The Royal Westminster Regiment ===
- Originated 1 April 1910 in New Westminster, British Columbia as the 104th Regiment
- Redesignated 15 December 1913 as the 104th Regiment Westminster Fusiliers of Canada
- Amalgamated 12 March 1920 with the 6th Regiment "The Duke of Connaught's Own Rifles" to form the 1st British Columbia Regiment
- Redesignated 1 November 1920 the 1st British Columbia Regiment (Duke of Connaught's Own)
- Reorganized 15 May 1924 into three separate regiments: the 1st British Columbia Regiment (Duke of Connaught's Own) (now the British Columbia Regiment (Duke of Connaught's Own); The Vancouver Regiment (now The British Columbia Regiment (Duke of Connaught's Own); and The Westminster Regiment
- Amalgamated 15 December 1936 with C Company of the 11th Machine Gun Battalion, CMGC and redesignated The Westminster Regiment (Machine Gun)
- Redesignated 1 April 1941 as The Westminster Regiment (Motor)
- Redesignated 7 November 1941 as the 2nd (Reserve) Battalion, The Westminster Regiment (Motor)
- Redesignated 31 January 1946 as The Westminster Regiment (Motor)
- Redesignated 6 October 1954 as The Westminster Regiment
- Redesignated 9 December 1966 as The Royal Westminster Regiment

== Perpetuations ==
=== Great War ===
- 47th Battalion (British Columbia), CEF
- 131st Battalion (Westminster), CEF

== History ==
=== Great War ===
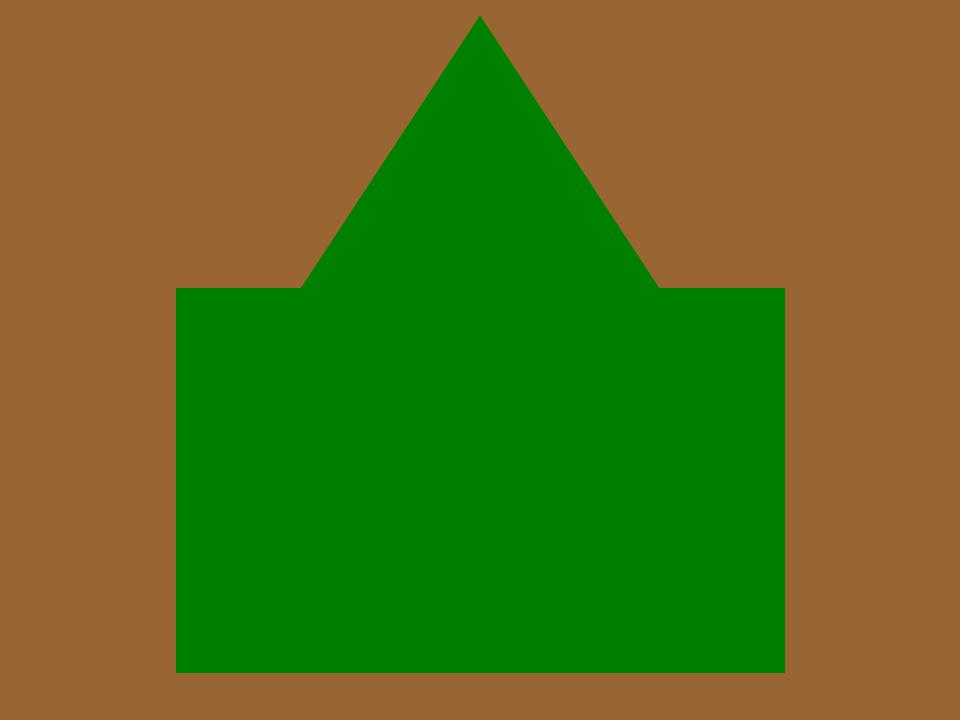
The distinguishing patch of the 47th Battalion (British Columbia), CEF.

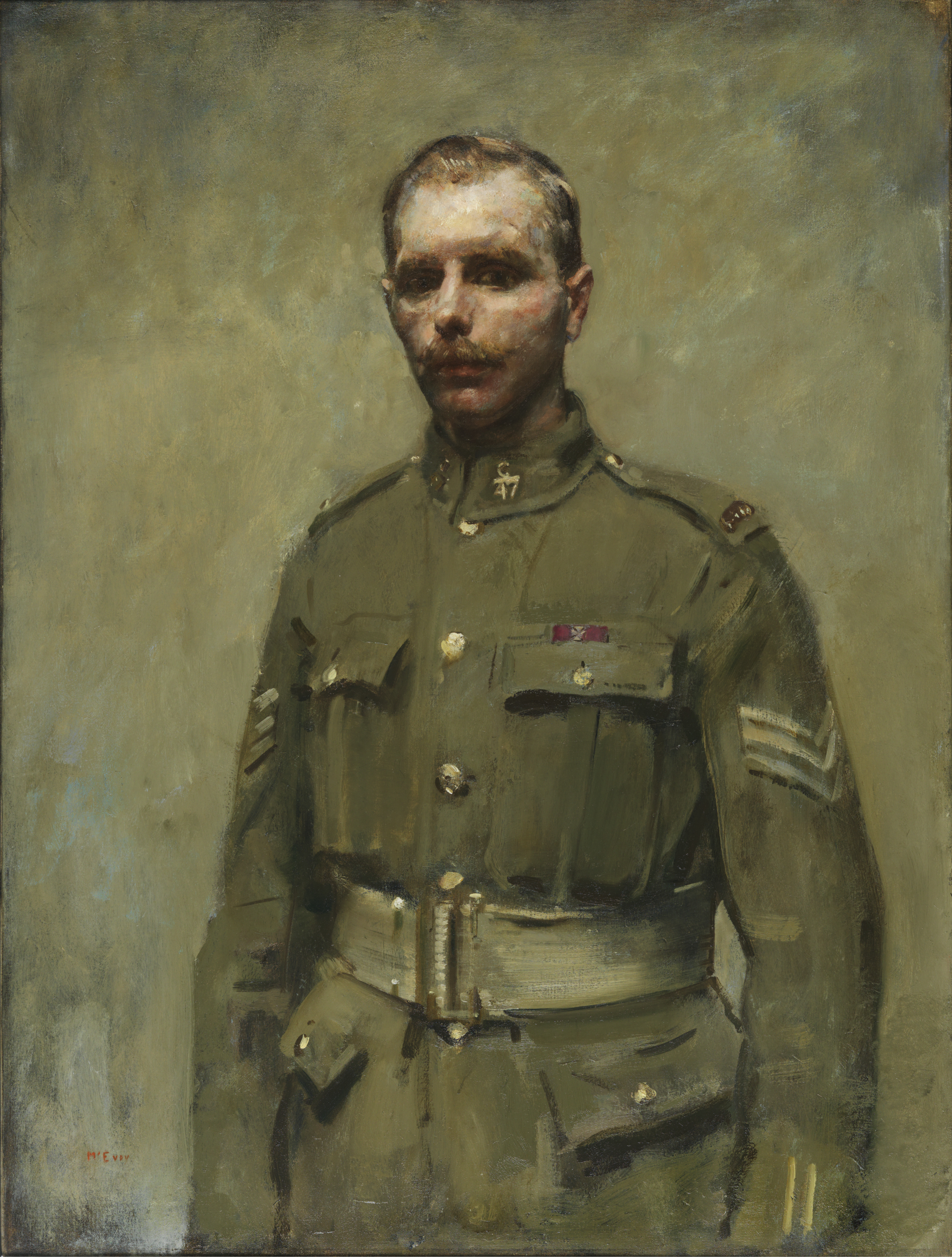
Sergeant Filip Konowal, VC, 47th Battilion, CEF

The 104th Regiment Westminster Fusiliers of Canada was placed on active service on 6 August 1914 for local protection duties. Subsequently, the regiment raised the 47th Battalion (British Columbia), CEF, which was authorized on 7 November 1914 and embarked for Britain on 13 November 1915. It disembarked in France on 11 August 1916, where it fought as part of the 10th Infantry Brigade, 4th Canadian Division in France and Flanders until the end of the war. The battalion disbanded on 30 August 1920.

A member of the 47th Battalion, Corporal Filip Konowal, received the Victoria Cross for his single handed destruction of a German machine gun position.

The 131st Battalion (Westminster), CEF, was authorized on 22 December 1915 and embarked for Britain on 31 October 1916, where its personnel were absorbed by the 30th Battalion, CEF, on 14 November 1916, to provide reinforcements for the Canadian Corps in the field. The battalion disbanded on 17 July 1917.

=== Between the wars ===
==== The Westminster Regiment ====
In 1920 the unit was amalgamated with the 6th Regiment (Duke of Connaught's Own Rifles) and in 1924 it was reformed as The Westminster Regiment.

The regiment was re-designated as a machine gun battalion and titled The Westminster Regiment (M.G.) in 1936.

=== Second World War ===
With the German invasion of Poland, the regiment's 1st Battalion was mobilized on 2 September 1939, as a machine gun battalion.

During the Second World War the regiment formed a part of Major General Bert Hoffmeister's 5th Canadian Armoured Division ("The Mighty Maroon Machine") taking part in the Italian Campaign before being transferred to Europe and participating in the liberation of Holland. The 2nd Battalion, Westminster Regiment served in the reserve force stationed in Canada.

At that time of mobilization the regiment consisted of Battalion HQ, A and B Companies in New Westminster, C Company in Mission and D Company in Chilliwack. The commanding officer was Lt Col C.J Loat, with Major "Little Joe" Sager as deputy commanding officer. Major Sager became CO at the end of 1939. On 27 May 1940, the unit deployed to Camp Dundurn Saskatchewan for additional training. Late in September 1940 the unit was deployed again, not overseas as they had hoped, but back to Vancouver for winter quarters at the then abandoned Hotel Vancouver.

==== The Westminster Regiment (Motor) ====
The unit was converted to a motor battalion and designated The Westminster Regiment (Motor) in early 1941. On 27 May 1941, the unit entrained at the CPR station in Vancouver for deployment to Camp Borden. At Borden the unit became part of the 1st Armoured Brigade, 1st Armoured Division. The regiment sailed from Halifax on HMT Andes for Great Britain on 13 November 1941, exactly 26 years from the day that the 47th Battalion CEF had sailed for Europe from the same port. The unit disembarked in Liverpool on 24 November 1941.

==== Great Britain ====
The brigade and the division were both re-numbered on arrival and the Westminsters were now part of 5th Armoured Brigade of the 5th Canadian Armoured Division under command of Major General Burt Hoffmeister, based at Aldershot for more training. Subsequently, the unit was moved to Farnham, Hove, Pippingford Park, and Cranwich Camp Thetford, Norfolk.

In March 1943 the Westminsters' commanding officer, Lieutenant Colonel Sager, was promoted to brigadier and given command of 4th Canadian Infantry Brigade. Command of the battalion passed to Lieutenant Colonel R.L. Tindall, who had been recently second in command of the Perth Regiment.

==== Deployment to Italy ====
On 15 November 1943, the regiment sailed aboard RMS Samaria for Algiers. Next the unit was sent by rail to Phillipeville and immediately embarked on the HMT Cameronia for Naples, Italy where they joined the 8th Army. The regiment went into the line and engaged in combat first at the town of Guardiagrele, near Monte Mariella. The unit's first casualties were suffered on 22 January 1944, during patrolling on this static part of the front. After eight days on the line the unit was withdrawn to the Sangro River on the night of 25–26 January. The regiment returned to the line on 31 January, relieving the 1/9 Gurkhas at Sararola. During this action the Westminsters developed the tactic of sending out patrols by night to lay over behind enemy lines in a deserted house through the day, calling in artillery and mortar fire by radio and then returning to their own lines the following night.

On 14 February 1944, Lt Col Gordon Corbould, a former Westie company commander and regimental 2IC, returned from his posting as second in command of the Irish Regiment of Canada to assume command of The Westminster Regiment. He would command the unit for the remainder of the war and through its hardest actions.

==== Corbould Force ====
On 1 March 1944, the regiment was relieved from the line by the Perth Regiment and sent for rest in Roatti. It was soon re-deployed as part of a battle group under Westminster CO Lt Col Corbould, known as "Corbould Force". The unit took part in the Battle of Monte Cassino, holding the line near the villages of Vallirontonda and Aquafondata, starting on 11 April 1944. The unit was relieved on 3 May 1944, and moved to a rest area at Pignataro.

==== Battle of the Melfa River ====
Major Jack Mahony, VC, OC "A" Coy, The Westminster Regiment (Motor) at the Battle of the Melfa River (Photo from The Royal Westminster Regiment)

On 11 May 1944, the attack on the Gustav Line and the Hitler Line commenced with the Westminsters and the 5th Armoured Division forming the exploitation force, hoping to break into the Liri Valley and the assault on Rome. The advance through the Liri valley included the Westminster's most famous action, the assault water crossing at the Melfa River. The Officer Commanding, "A" Company at the Battle of the Melfa River, Major Jack Mahony, was awarded the Victoria Cross for his gallantry and leadership under fire during that action fought in conjunction with the tanks of Lord Strathcona's Horse (Royal Canadians). This action cemented a friendship between the two regiments that has endured since the Second World War.

==== Gothic Line ====
The entire division was relieved from the line on 30 May 1944, and carried out "rest and refit" duties near the villages of Baia and Latina.

By August 1944 the Anzio Bridgehead force had broken out, Rome had fallen and the advance to the Po River commenced. The Westies joined the fight on 6 August 1944, at Montefalco in the advance to the next German defensive position, the Gothic Line which the regiment engaged starting on 26 August. The unit was involved in the crossing of the Fogia River. and the Conca River. The unit completed the action on 5 September 1944.

==== Coriano ====
After a few days out of the line the regiment was thrown into the Battle for Coriano Ridge, starting on 13 September 1944. The regiment prevailed despite heavy shelling and losses, being relieved by the 4th British Division. The regiment was moved back for rest at the coastal town of Riccione on 14 September 1944

==== San Mauro and the Rubicone River ====
The regiment was soon back in action, following more training. They were assigned to pass over the Uso River bridgehead held by the Princess Louise Dragoon Guards and take the village of San Mauro. The attack commenced on 23 September 1944, with the bypassing of San Giustina, which had not been captured and was held by stiff German resistance. "A" Company and "B" Squadron of Lord Strathcona's Horse (Royal Canadians) led the advance. The advance continued into the flat country under heavy fire to capture San Vito. On 25 September, the order was received to continue the advance and cross the Rubicone River, this time with the tanks of the Governor General's Horse Guards in support. The attack ran into thick minefields and heavy shelling, but no German infantry and regimental casualties were few.

==== Porter Force ====
The Westminster Regiment was assigned to Porter Force on 10 November 1944. This ad hoc formation was intended to work with Popski's Private Army and Italian partisans in the forward area south of Ravenna. The mission was to hold the existing line, put pressure on the enemy and advance when the opportunity presented itself. Regimental HQ was in Vincoli with "A" and "B" Companies in San Stefano and "C" Company in Gambellara. The action consisted of extensive night patrolling and night advances to contact the enemy. The pressure forced the enemy back across the Uniti Canal and into San Pancrazio.

The regiment advanced through patrol actions across the Ronco River to the Scolo Lama canal, where bitter German resistance was encountered. Consolidating the advances by 26 November 1944, the Westminster's held a line of 7,000 yards (6,400 m), a very long front for a unit of this size in this type of warfare. The campaign to clear the Po River valley was severely hampered by the Italian climate and the rain at this time of year turned the flat valley into lakes and rivers.

The Porter Force membership ended with over 40 German prisoners taken and many more casualties inflicted on the enemy.

==== Adriatic battles ====
The regiment was employed as part of the I Canadian Corps which was given the role in the winter of 1944 of assaulting over the Montone River, capturing Ravenna and the surrounding area, all with the aim of reducing pressure on the Fifth US Army operating near Bologna. The attack was commenced at 0800 hours on 2 December 1944, and the unit captured the town of San Pancrazio quickly.

After a month in continuous combat the unit was put under command of 11th Canadian Infantry Brigade and crossed the Lamone River in a night attack. The lead elements engaged in a difficult battle in the town of Villanova, where "A" and "C" Companies successfully engaged a column of German tanks with small arms and PIATs.

The regiment was next engaged in the battles for the Naviglio Canal and the River Senio between 12 and 22 December 1944. Both actions were continuous and involved dealing with heavy German opposition in concert with the tanks of the Strathconas once again.

On 23 December 1944, the regiment was withdrawn for rest at Ravenna after 43 days and nights of continuous combat.

==== Villanova ====
The regiment returned to action near the town of Villanova on 27 December 1944. The action was to advance and take the town of Rosetta in the flat country of that area. The battle was against a formation of the Waffen-SS and the fighting was fierce against the determined resistance. As the Westie tradition dictated the regiment was not deterred and the objective was captured, the enemy forced to withdraw.

The unit was relieved by the 1st Battalion of the Welsh Regiment and a squadron of the RAF Regiment on 29 December 1944.

==== Conventello ====
Early in the New Year the regiment was sent to fill a gap in the line at Conventello and bore the brunt of a German counterattack in that area with the aim of recapturing Revenna. The attack included massed German artillery and infantry attacks. The result was that the Westminsters in cooperation with the Strathconas' tanks and the Irish Regiment of Canada held the line and 200 wounded and prisoners were taken, with over 200 German dead.

On 13 January 1945, the unit was moved to Fano and on to San Severino Marche for rest and refitting.

==== Departure from the Italian Campaign ====
The Westminsters were dispatched to Livorno on 21 February 1945, and from there embarked on United States Navy shipping and conveyed to Marseille, France. The unit mounted its own transport and drove through the Rhône valley to Belgium, where they leaguered at Deinze.

==== Northwest Europe ====
The regiment was deployed to Meulebeke in Belgium as part of the 5th Canadian Armoured Division, now part of the I Canadian Corps, First Canadian Army. Most of the unit was sent on leave when the order came on 17 March 1945, to prepare to move into battle again. The first area of operations was in neighbouring Netherlands, on the Meuse (Maas) and Waal river lines near Nijmegen, where the Westminsters relieved the 12th Manitoba Dragoons and commenced active patrolling and used the battalion mortars against the German positions across the Waal in Tiel.

On 5 April 1945, the regiment was deployed to an area between the Waal and the Neder Rijn in conjunction with two companies of the 2nd Belgian Fusiliers. This was in preparation for a major offensive, which commenced on 12 April, with a move to Doesburg, just west of Arnhem. The division was given the task of exploiting the breakthrough created by the British 49th West Riding Division and driving to the Zuider Zee. At this point the unit's anti-tank platoon was issued Stuart tanks, unusual for an infantry regiment. The unit carried out a night attack across the IJssel River on the night of 12/13 April 1945 and passed through Arnhem. Pressing the attack, the 5th Canadian Armoured Division, in concert with the 1st Canadian Infantry Division. During the attack Lt Oldfield won the Military Cross for the action of his "A" Company Scout Platoon in clearing a German position and taking 40 prisoners.

The regiment attacked in concert with the Strathconas and the British Columbia Dragoons, capturing Deelen Airfield. The armoured drive continued against intense German opposition in fluid mobile operations, by-passing points of resistance to clean them up later. The unit advanced through Voorhuizen and Barneveld. German defences were in chaos and many prisoners were taken in the drive to Putten. When the operation had ended on 18 April 1945, the unit had covered 33 miles (53 km) and participated in cutting off thousands of German troops in the Amsterdam area.

The unit commenced coast watching and patrolling near Groningen to prevent the escape or infiltration of German forces still holding the islands off shore.

The unit's final action was the capture of the German anti-aircraft battery at Termunterzijl. The battery's 128 mm guns controlled the whole area and the operation was hampered by the lack of artillery and air support. The action was hard-fought against stiff German defences built in great depth to protect the battery. Relentless pressure form the Westminsters forced the abandonment of the battery and the withdrawal of the remaining German forces.

==== End of the Second World War ====
Hostilities ended in Europe on 7 May 1945. The unit was repatriated after a long wait for sea transport and passed through New York City, Toronto and finally to Vancouver by train. They marched up New Westminster's Columbia Street to Queen's Park where the final dismissal was given on 19 January 1946.

==== War record ====
During the Second World War 4,236 men passed through The Westminster Regiment (Motor). Of these 134 were killed in action. Awards conferred on members of the 1st Battalion of The Westminster Regiment (Motor) British Commonwealth were: 1 Victoria Cross, 3 Distinguished Service Order, 6 Military Cross, 1 Order of the British Empire, 1 Member of the Order of the British Empire, 18 Military Medal & 24 Mention In Dispatches. The Regiment was also awarded medals for courage by the Dutch Government.

The unit was noted for never having failed to make an objective assigned. The Commander of the 5th Canadian Armoured Division, Major General BM Hoffmeister, described the regiment's war record as "a record of particularly outstanding accomplishment".

=== Post-Second World War ===
The Westies lost their "Motor" designation in 1954, but gained their "Royal" title in 1966.

In May and June 1948, The Westminster Regiment (Motor) provided aid to the civil power during the Fraser River Floods. This operation took place over three weeks.

Then in 1954, the Major General Howard Kennedy Report was completed and made some recommendations to reorganizing the army. The report concluded the following: training would be required to be flexible, remove the coastal and air defence units, increase the number of armoured units, decrease the number of headquarters from 35 to 26.

Between 1956 and 1964, the concept of the Militia units mobilizing overseas and contributing to those efforts was changed quite dramatically. Therefore, the role of the Militia was changed and the funding and size was reduced. The role in 1957 was changed to civil defence in light of the substantial nuclear threat. From 1964 to 1969 the Militia was further reduced in personnel from 23,000 to 19,000.

On 24 May 1963 The Westminster Regiment was granted freedom of the city by the City of New Westminster. and in Pitt Meadows, British Columbia on Saturday, 22 Sept. 2012.

The Royal Westminster Regiment has provided personnel for many United Nations missions such as Cyprus (UNFICYP), Egypt (UNEF II) 1973–79, Golan Heights (UNDOF) 1974–present and the former Yugoslavia (UNPROFOR) 1992–1993.

=== Afghanistan ===
The regiment contributed an aggregate of more than 20% of its authorized strength to the various Task Forces which served in Afghanistan between 2002 and 2014.

=== Lineage chart ===
Lineage chart

1910	104th Regt (Note: Two companies from 6th Regiment, "Duke of Connaught's Own Rifles")
1913	104th Regt Westminster Fusiliers of Canada
1914	47th Bn, CEF
1915	131st "Overseas" Bn, CEF
1916	Absorbed by 30th "Overseas" Bn
1920	Disbanded	3rd Bn (47th Bn, CEF), 1st BC Regt	5th Bn (131st Bn, CEF), (Note: Reserve) 1st BC Regt
1920	3rd Bn (47th Bn, CEF), 1st BC Regt (Duke of Connaught's Own)	5th Bn (131st Bn, CEF), 1st BC Regt (Duke of Connaught's Own)
1924	1st Bn (47th Bn, CEF), The Westminster Regt	2nd Bn (131st Bn, CEF), The Westminster Regt
C Coy, 11th MG Bn, CMGC
1936	The Westminster Regt (MG)	Disbanded
1939	The Westminster Regt (MG), CASF
1940	1st Bn, The Westminster Regt (MG), CASF	2nd (Reserve) Bn, The Westminster Regt (MG)
1940	1st Bn, The Westminster Regt (Motor), CASF
1941	2nd (Reserve) Bn, The Westminster Regt (Motor)
1946	Disbanded	The Westminster Regt (Motor)
1954	The Westminster Regt
1966	The Royal Westminster Regt

== Alliances ==
- United Kingdom – The Royal Regiment of Fusiliers

== Battle honours ==
In the list below, battle honours in small capitals were awarded for participation in large operations and campaigns, while those in lowercase indicate honours granted for more specific battles. Those battle honours in bold are emblazoned on the regimental colour.

First World War
- Mount Sorrel
- **Somme, 1916**
- Ancre Heights
- Ancre, 1916
- **Arras, 1917, '18**
- **Vimy, 1917**
- **Hill 70**
- **Ypres, 1917**
- **Passchendaele**
- **Amiens**
- Scarpe, 1918
- **Drocourt–Quéant**
- Hindenburg Line
- **Canal du Nord**
- **Valenciennes**
- France and Flanders, 1916–18
Second World War
- Liri Valley
- **Melfa Crossing**
- **Gothic Line**
- **Coriano**
- **Lamone Crossing**
- **Misano Ridge**
- Casale
- **Naviglio Canal**
- **Italy, 1944–1945**
- **IJsselmeer**
- **Delfzijl Pocket**
- **North-West Europe, 1945**
South-West Asia
Afghanistan

== Armoury ==
Site	Date(s) & Architect	Designated	Location	Description
The Armoury; 530 Queens Ave	1895; Thomas Fuller (architect)	Canada's Register of Historic Places; Recognized - 1987 Register of the Government of Canada Heritage Buildings	New Westminster, British Columbia	large, low-massed, rectangular Neo-Gothic style structure on a centrally located sloping site houses The Royal Westminster Regiment

== Badges ==
Hat badge of The Westminster Regiment, as worn during World War II

Officers' and Chief Warrant Officers' hat badge of The Royal Westminster Regiment, as worn after 1967

Non-commissioned members' hat badge of The Royal Westminster Regiment, as worn after 1967

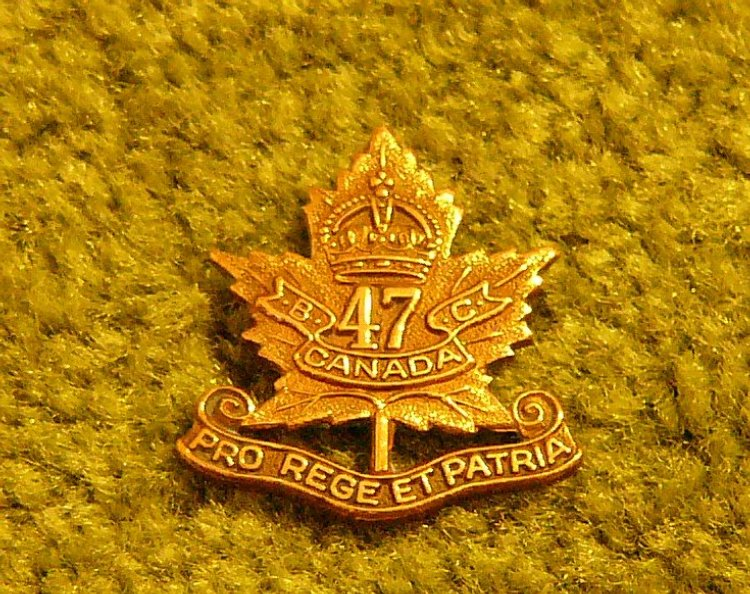
Collar badge of the 47th Battalion CEF, as worn by the 47th Battalion, The Westminster Regiment and The Royal Westminster Regiment

== Cadet units ==
There are several Royal Canadian Army Cadets units spread across British Columbia which are affiliated with the Royal Westminster Regiment.

Corps	Location
1789 RCACC	Hope
1922 RCACC	CFS Aldergrove
2316 RCACC	New Westminster
2822 RCACC	Surrey
1838 RCACC	Maple Ridge

Cadet units affiliated to the Royal Westminster Regiment receive support and also are entitled to wear traditional regimental accoutrements on their uniforms. The 2316 RCACC is the main corps that uses the armoury, although it is shared with many different units across BC.

== The Royal Westminster Regiment Museum ==
The Royal Westminster Regiment Museum
- Location: The Armoury, 530 Queens Avenue, New Westminster, British Columbia, Canada
- Type: Regimental Museum

The museum acquires, identifies, preserves and exhibits a permanent collection of military artifacts and memorabilia from the experience of the Regiment and its antecedents. The museum encourages within the community, a realization of the contribution to the community and the nation made by the Regiment and its antecedents. The museum's goal is to imbue a spirit of pride and selflessness in those who continue to serve.

== See also ==
- List of armouries in Canada
- Military history of Canada
- History of the Canadian Army
- Canadian Forces
- The Canadian Crown and the Canadian Forces

== Alliances ==
- United Kingdom - The Royal Regiment of Fusiliers

== Order of precedence ==
Preceded by The Queen's Own Cameron Highlanders of Canada	The Royal Westminster Regiment	Succeeded by The Calgary Highlanders (10th Canadians)
