= 47th Battalion (British Columbia), CEF =

Canadian infantry battalion

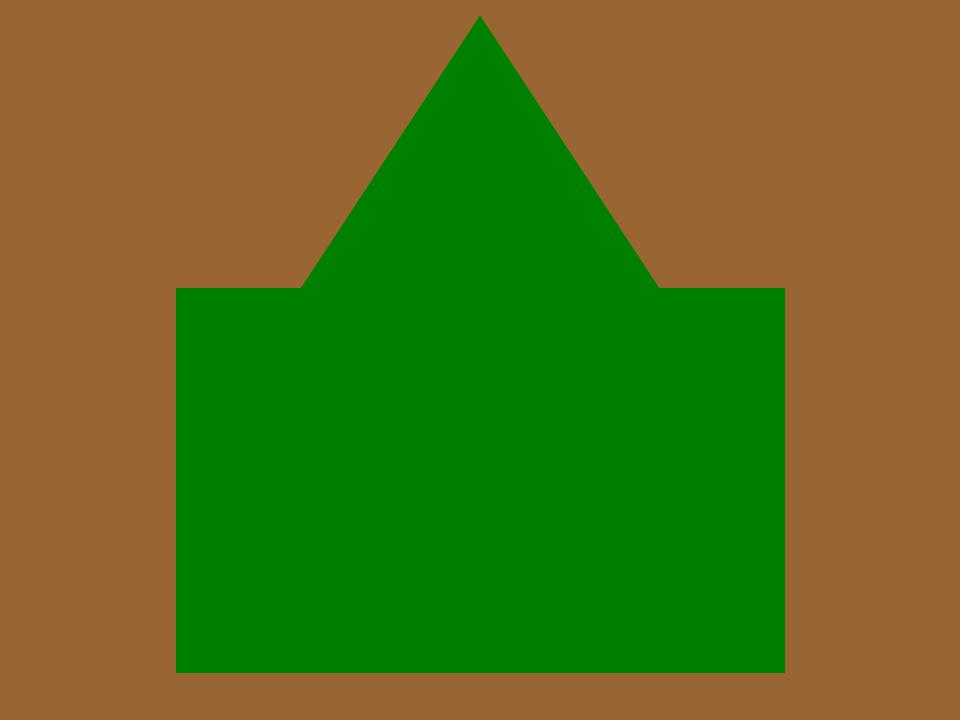
The distinguishing patch of the 47th Battalion (British Columbia), CEF

The 47th Battalion (British Columbia), CEF, was an infantry battalion of the Canadian Expeditionary Force during the Great War.

== History ==
The 47th Battalion was authorized on 7 November 1914 and embarked for Britain on 13 November 1915. It disembarked in France on 11 August 1916, where it fought as part of the 10th Infantry Brigade, 4th Canadian Division in France and Flanders until the end of the war. By war's end the 47th had lost 899 men. One third of the fatalities, 271 men, were killed in the last 100 days of the war. The battalion was disbanded on 30 August 1920. The 47th Battalion recruited in New Westminster, Vancouver and Victoria, British Columbia and was mobilized at New Westminster.

The 47th Battalion had four officers commanding:

- Lt-Col W.N. Winsby, 13 November 1915 – 24 April 1917
- Lt.Col. M.J. Francis, 24 April 1917 – 14 December 1917
- Lt.Col. R.H. Webb, MC, 14 December 1917 – 24 April 1918
- Lt.Col. H.L. Keegan, DSO, 24 April 1918-demobilization

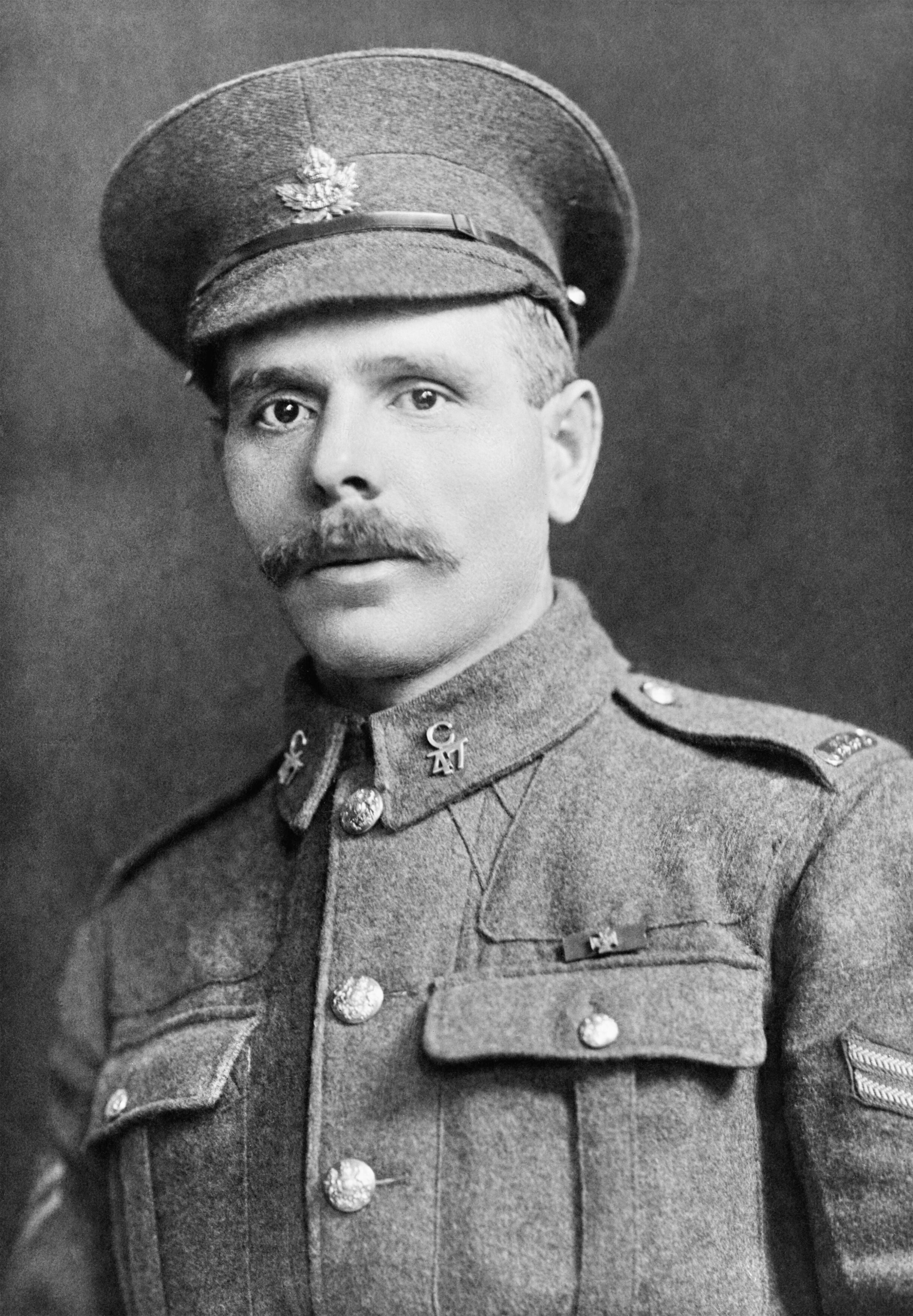
Acting Corporal (later Sergeant) Filip Konowal, VC

One member of the 47th Battalion was awarded the Victoria Cross. Acting Corporal (later Sergeant) Filip Konowal was awarded the Victoria Cross for his actions during the period 22–24 August 1917, at the Battle of Hill 70 in Lens, France.

Later in the war the 47th was designated the 47th Western Ontario Battalion because there were more men from that area in the unit than any other part of the country.

== Battle honours ==
The 47th Battalion was awarded the following battle honours:

- Mount Sorrel
- Somme, 1916
- Ancre Heights
- Ancre, 1916
- Arras, 1917, '18
- Vimy, 1917
- Hill 70
- Ypres 1917
- Passchendaele
- Amiens
- Scarpe 1918
- Drocourt-Quéant
- Hindenburg Line
- Canal du Nord
- Valenciennes
- France and Flanders, 1916-18

== Perpetuation ==
The 47th Battalion (British Columbia), CEF, is perpetuated by The Royal Westminster Regiment.

== See also ==
- List of infantry battalions in the Canadian Expeditionary Force

== Sources ==
- Canadian Expeditionary Force 1914-1919 by Col. G.W.L. Nicholson, CD, Queen's Printer, Ottawa, Ontario, 1962
