= Lord Strathcona's Horse (Royal Canadians) =

Armoured regiment of the Canadian Army

- Regimental badge
- Active: 1 July 1901 – present
- Country: Canada
- Branch: Canadian Army
- Type: Armoured
- Role: Tanks
- Size: Regiment: Regimental headquarters; Three heavy tank squadrons
- Part of: 1 Canadian Mechanized Brigade Group
- Garrison/HQ: CFB Edmonton
- Nicknames: Strathcona's, Strats, Straths (WWII era)
- Motto: Perseverance
- Colors: Scarlet and myrtle green
- March: "Soldiers of the King"
- Engagements: Second Boer War; First World War; Second World War; Korean War; War in Afghanistan
- Battle honours: See #Battle honours
- Website: army.gc.ca/en/3-canadian-division/lord-strathconas-horse/index.page

Commanders
- Current commander: LCol Alex Nitu
- Colonel-in-chief: King Charles III
- Colonel of the Regiment: Colonel Jamie Cade (Ret’d)
- Notable commanders: Sam Steele

Insignia
NATO map symbol
LdSH

- Tartan: Forbes (Pipes and Drums)
- Abbreviation: LdSH(RC)

Lord Strathcona's Horse (Royal Canadians) (LdSH(RC)) is a regular armoured regiment of the Canadian Army. Currently based in Edmonton, Alberta, the regiment is part of 3rd Canadian Division's 1 Canadian Mechanized Brigade Group. Members of the regiment are commonly called Strathconas or Strats as a short form. It was one of the last regiments in the British Empire to be created and raised by a private individual, Donald Alexander Smith, 1st Baron Strathcona and Mount Royal.

The regimental motto is "Perseverance". The colonel-in-chief of the regiment is King Charles III, while the colonel of the regiment is Colonel(Ret’d) Jamie Cade. The current commanding officer is Lieutenant-Colonel A. Nitu, and the regimental sergeant major is Chief Warrant Officer B. Holmes.

== Regimental structure ==
The regiment is composed of a regimental headquarters (RHQ), three sabre (tank) squadrons (A, B, and C Sqns), and headquarters squadron which provides service support. In September 2006, B Squadron deployed to Afghanistan using the Leopard C2, the first NATO deployment of main battle tanks to Afghanistan.

Each year the squadron that distinguishes itself with the highest efficiency rating in the regiment earns the title "Prince of Wales Squadron" for the year. The regiment has seven affiliated cadet corps in Alberta and British Columbia.

== Role ==
As of 2014, Lord Strathcona's Horse operated with 40 Leopard 2s (20 A4s, 9 A4Ms and 11 2A6Ms) and 12 Coyote Reconnaissance Vehicles. Due to a change in Canadian army doctrine in the early 2000s away from heavy armour to more infantry-centred operations, Lord Strathcona's Horse was for several years the only regular armoured regiment to operate MBTs.

== Heraldry ==
Blazon: Lord Strathcona's coat of arms, without supporters, being a shield surmounted by a maple tree inclined to the left, and cut through by a beaver working at the base; in the chief a demi-lion rampant; in the centre a railroad spike and hammer crossed; in the base a canoe bearing a flag inscribed "NW" and containing four men; the whole surrounded by a riband which is encircled by a wreath of roses, thistles, shamrocks and maple leaves, and inscribed "Lord Strathcona's Horse Royal Canadians", surmounted by a scroll bearing the motto "perseverance", and the whole surmounted by the Crown".

This badge commemorates Lord Strathcona's role in the fur trade and in the settlement of North West Canada (as the province of Alberta was called prior to 1905) by its representation of a Hudson's Bay Company trade canoe, the flag 'NW' (for "North West"), and the representation of the railway construction tools. The latter mark Lord Strathcona's direct role in the construction of the Canadian Pacific Railway.

The uniform shoulder titles are "STRATHCONA'S" (in brass, for service dress uniform) and "LdSH(RC)" (embroidered, for field combat clothing)

== History ==
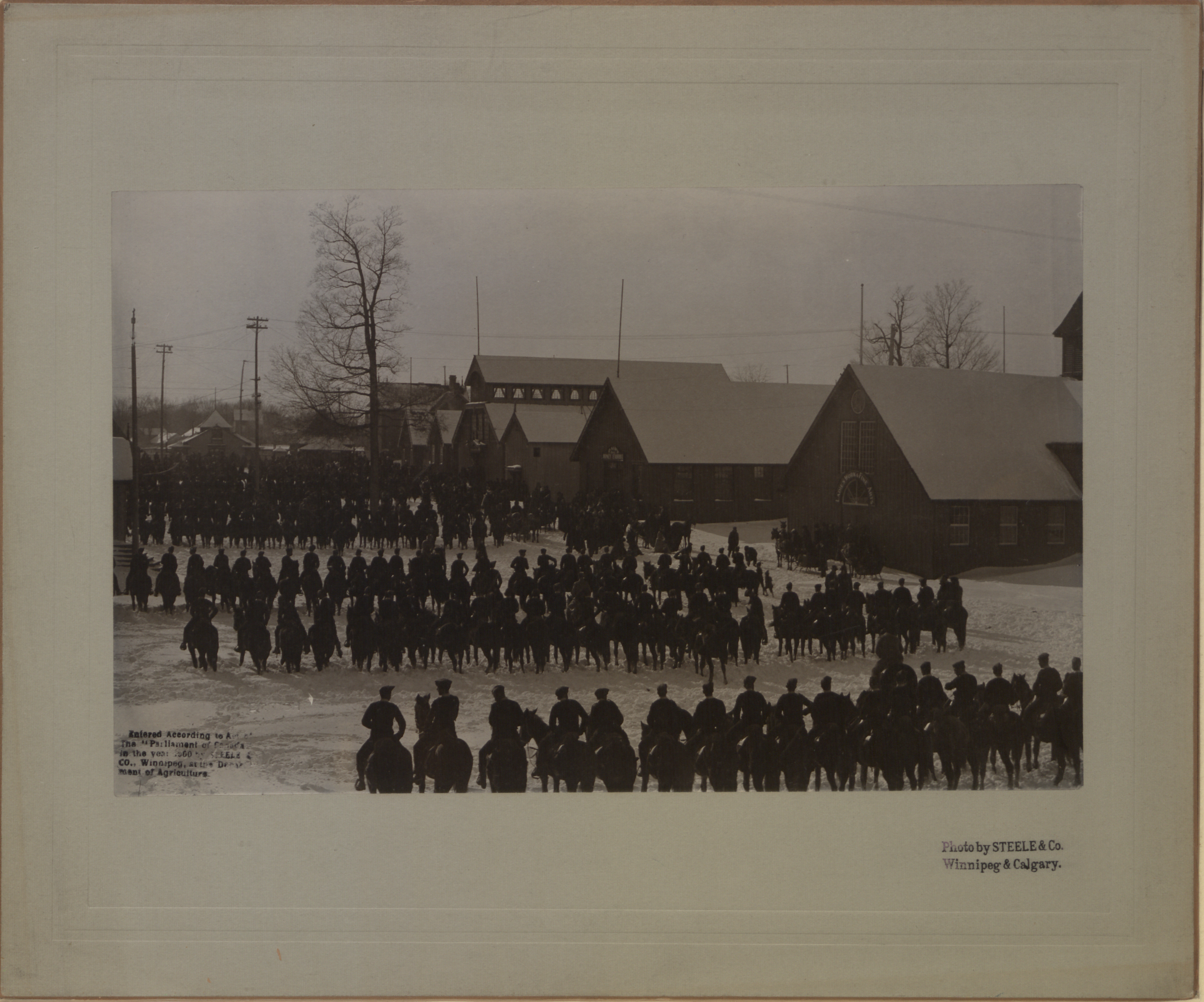
First mounted review of Strathcona's Horse at Ottawa, Ontario, 7 March 1900

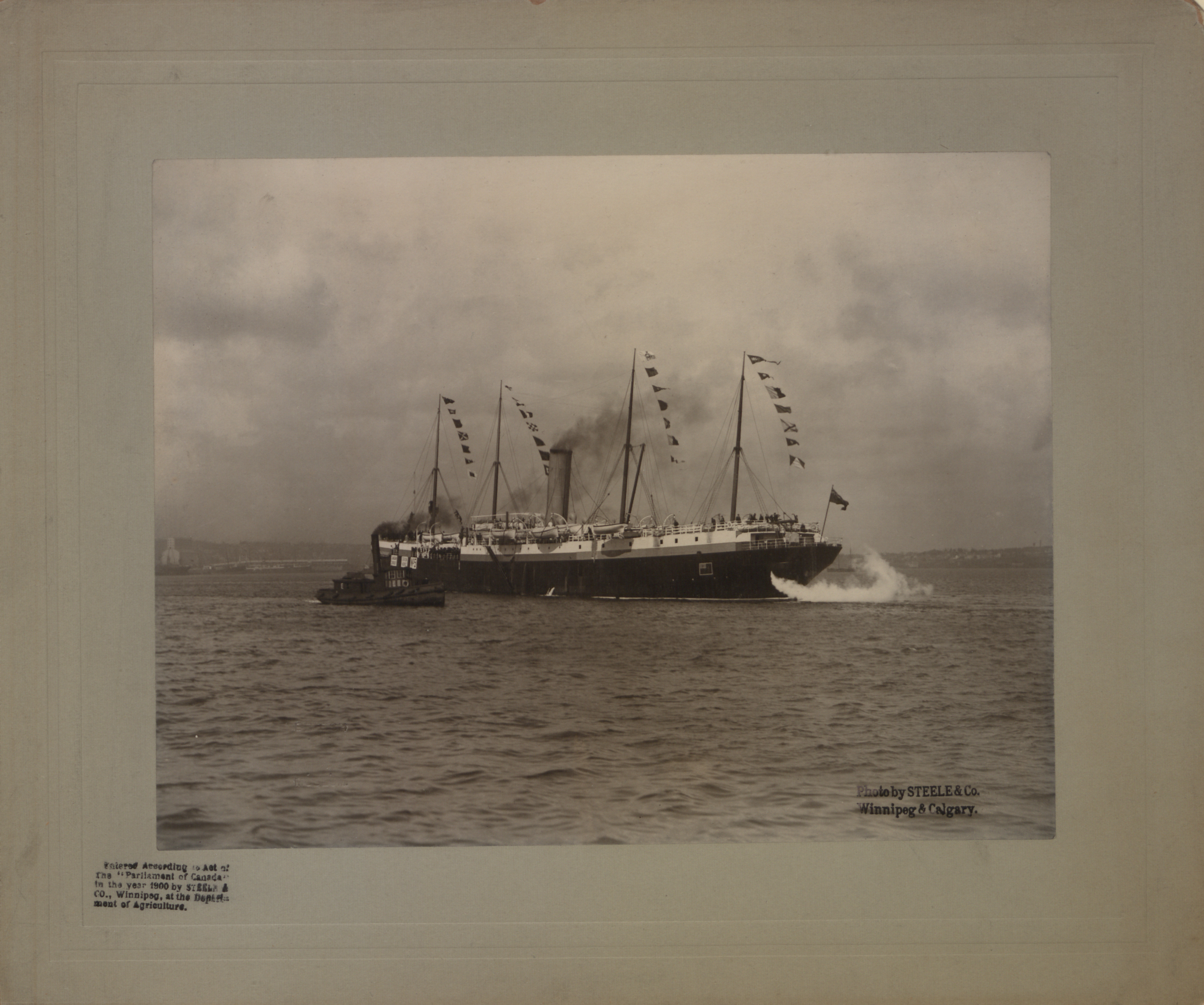
The Monterey leaving Halifax with Strathcona's Horse for South Africa, 17 March 1900

=== Strathcona's Horse and the Boer War ===
Strathcona's Horse was authorized on 1 February 1900 and embarked for Africa on 17 March 1900. There it fought as part of the 3rd Mounted Brigade and 4th Infantry Brigade, II Division, until its departure from the theatre of operations on 20 January 1901. The unit disbanded on 9 March 1901.

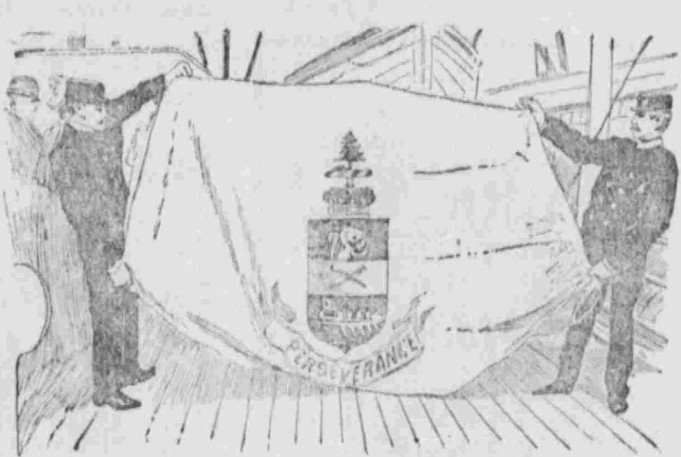
Regimental flag carried during the War, 1900

The regiment was one of the last in the British Empire to be created and raised by a private individual, Donald Alexander Smith, 1st Baron Strathcona and Mount Royal. During the Boer War, Lord Strathcona recruited and equipped the cavalry regiment at his own expense for service in South Africa. Many skilled horsemen (cowboys and North-West Mounted Police members) enlisted, allowing for a short training period and rapid deployment to Africa. The 537 officers and men, as well as 599 horses, of the new regiment sailed from Halifax on 18 March 1900 and arrived in Cape Town on 10 April. Along with The Royal Canadian Dragoons, the regiment won renown for their scouting skills. Rumour exists that members of the North-West Mounted Police serving with the regiment during the Boer War preferred the boots the regiment wore, and adopted them as their own – hence the name "Strathcona boots" for Royal Canadian Mounted Police high brown boots.

Another legacy of the official kit is the popularity of the distinctive Stetson Campaign Hat worn by all Canadians serving in Africa during the Second Boer War. After seeing Canadian troops in this attire at the Relief of Mafeking, British Officer Robert Baden-Powell ordered 10,000 of the hats for his own troops.

Supposedly, General Kitchener was astonished at the size of the newly arrived Canadian soldiers. Their commander, Sam Steele, is said to have replied "My apologies, sir. I combed all of Canada and these are the smallest I could find."

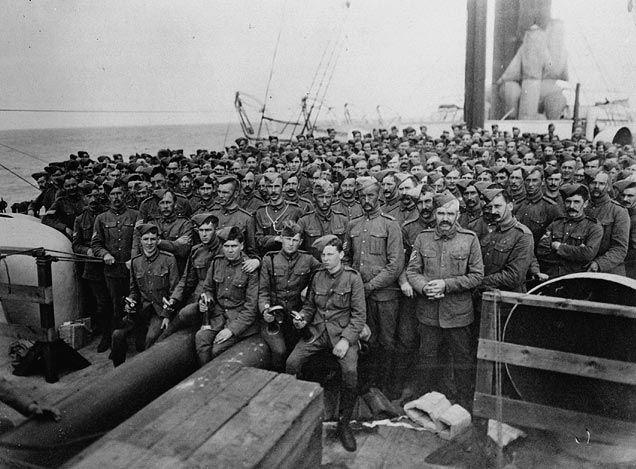
Strathcona's Horse en route to South Africa aboard the S.S. Monterey in 1899.

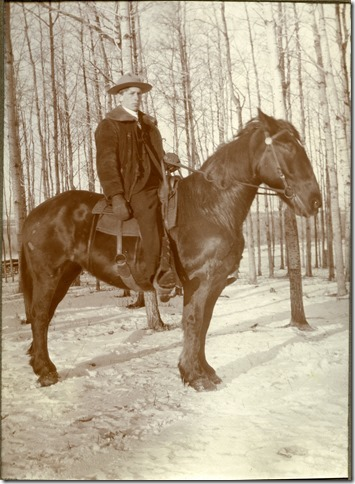
Trooper August Jenkins killed in action 1 July 1900

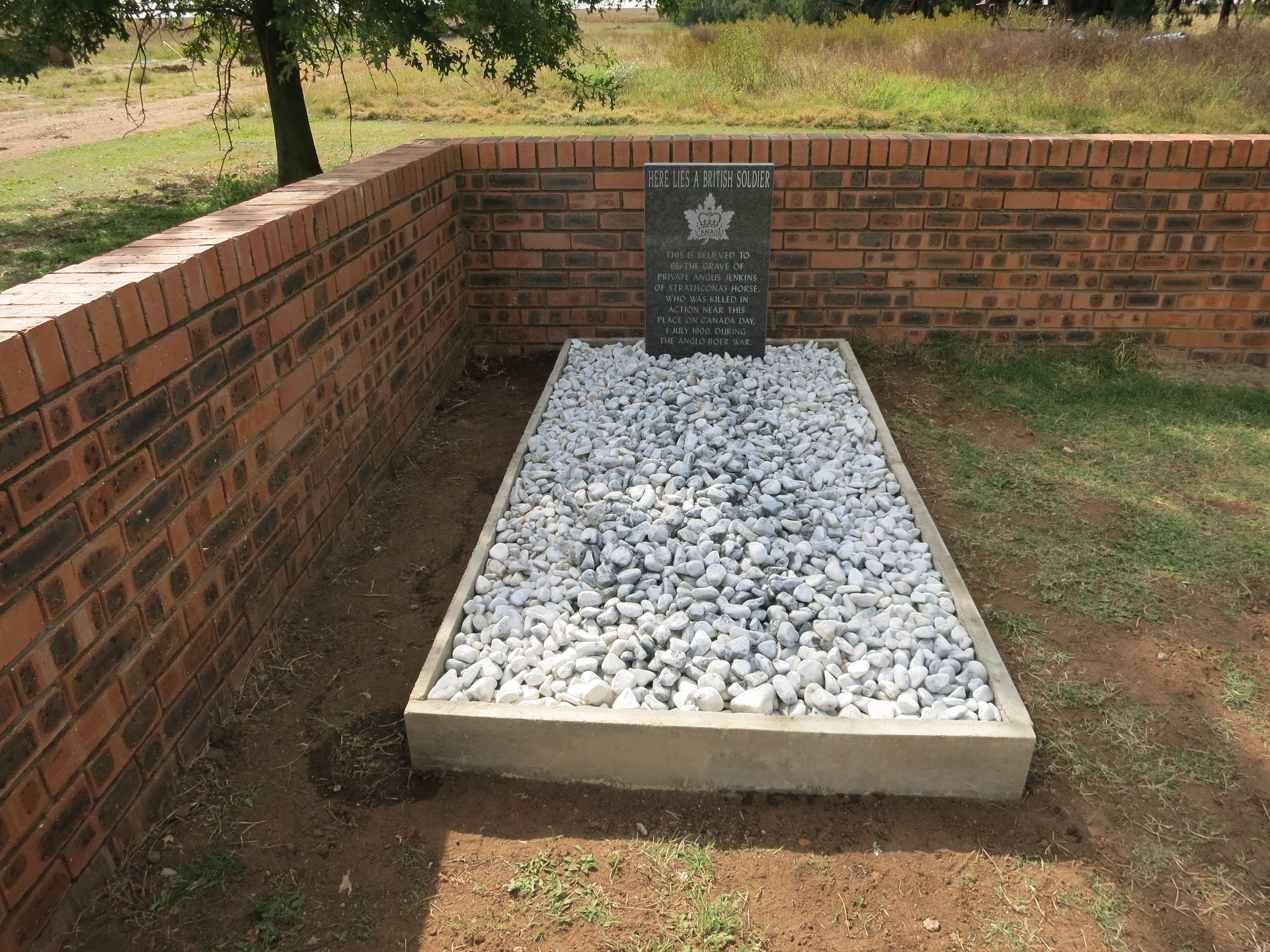
Farm "Paardefontein" R547, near Val, Mpumalanga. "Here lies a British Soldier This is believed to be the grave of Private Angust Jenkins of Strathcona's Horse who was killed in action near this place on Canada Day, 1 July 1900 during the Anglo-Boer War"(Monument sponsored by David Scholtz, member of the Military History Society)

=== Early 1900s ===
After the war, the regiment boarded ship at Cape Town on 20 January 1901 and arrived in London on 14 February. Here they met Lord Strathcona for the first time and were presented their medals by King Edward VII personally. On its return to Canada on 9 March 1901, the regiment was disbanded. The name "Strathcona's Horse" was revived in 1909 when the Royal Canadian Mounted Rifles (which had been created in the Permanent Force in 1901) was renamed "Strathcona's Horse (Royal Canadians)". The word Lord was prepended to the regimental title in 1911.

=== First World War ===
The regiment was placed on active service at the start of the Great War on 6 August 1914 for instructional and camp administration duties. On 14 September 1914 the regiment mobilized Lord Strathcona's Horse (Royal Canadians), CEF, which embarked for England on 3 October 1914. On 5 May 1915 it disembarked in France, where it fought dismounted in an infantry role with Seeley's Detachment (really the Canadian Cavalry Brigade, part of the 2nd Indian Cavalry Division), 1st Canadian Division. On 27 January 1916, the regiment remounted and resumed its cavalry role as part of the 1st Canadian Cavalry Brigade, with whom it continued to fight in France and Flanders until the end of the war. The overseas regiment disbanded on 6 November 1920.

At the outbreak of the First World War, the regiment was mobilised and began its training in England. In 1915, Lord Strathcona's Horse served as infantry in the trenches in France. On 16 February 1916, the Strathcona's were reconstituted as a mounted force and, as an Imperial Service Regiment, served in the Canadian Cavalry Brigade attached to the 2nd Indian Cavalry Division, which in November 1916 became the 5th Cavalry Division of the British 4th Army. In March 1917, the regiment saw action as cavalry during the defence of the Somme front. It was during this fighting that Lieutenant Frederick Harvey won the Victoria Cross for rushing a German machine gun post and capturing the gun position. In spring 1918 during the last great German offensive, called by the Germans Operation Michael, when the Imperial and French armies were on the verge of being split, the regiment earned its third Victoria Cross.

On 31 March 1918, in what is known as "the last great cavalry charge" at the Battle of Moreuil Wood, Lieutenant Gordon Flowerdew was posthumously awarded the Victoria Cross for leading the charge in a successful engagement with entrenched German forces. Nearly three-quarters of the Canadian cavalry involved in the attack against German machine-gun positions were killed or wounded. Unable to break the trench deadlock and of little use at the front, cavalry remained behind the lines for much of the war. During the German offensives of March and April 1918, however, the cavalry played an essential role in the open warfare that temporarily confronted the retreating British forces.

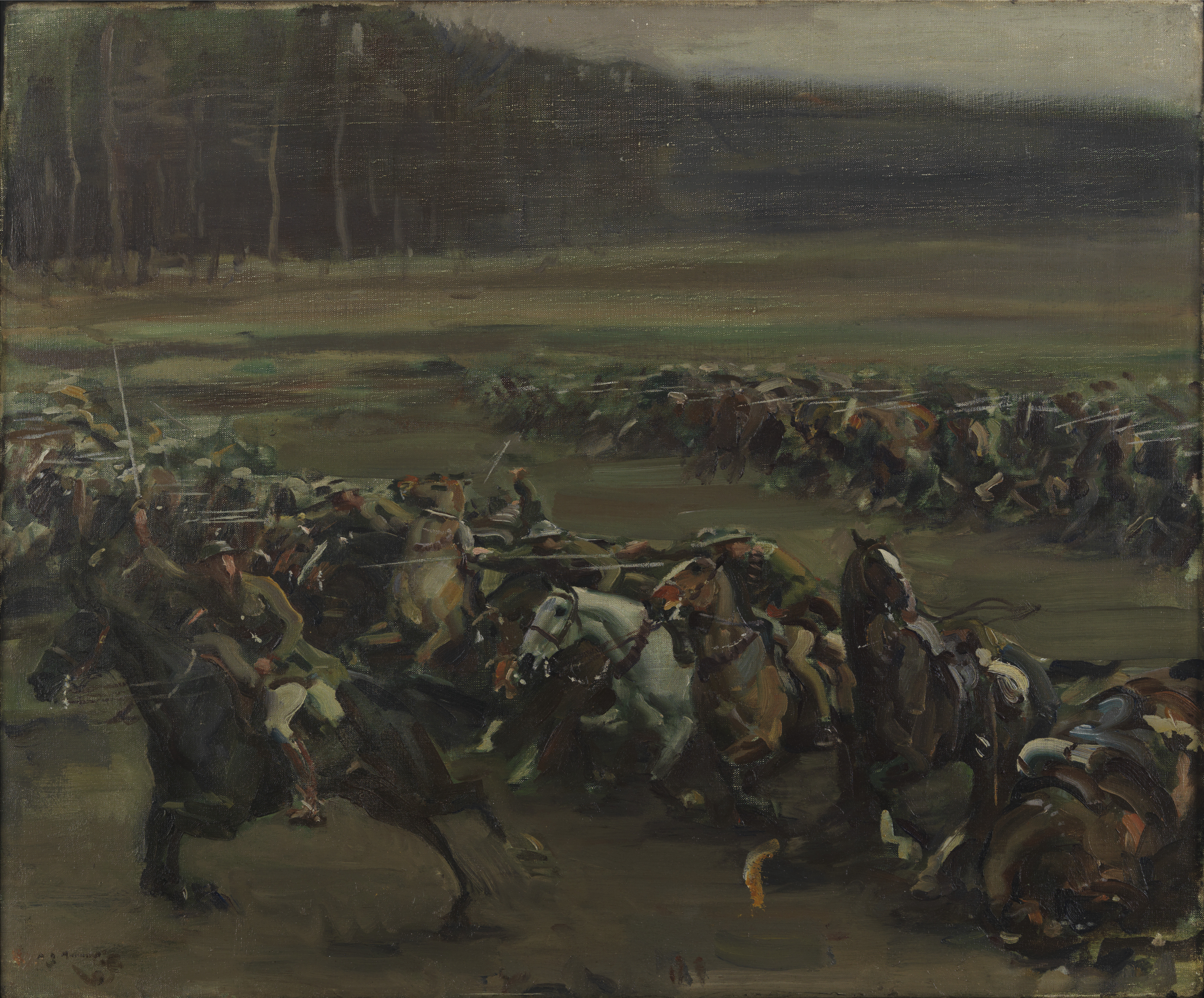
Charge of Flowerdew's Squadron by Alfred Munnings

=== Second World War ===
On 24 May 1940, Regimental Headquarters and one squadron were mobilized together with the Regimental Headquarters and one squadron of The Royal Canadian Dragoons to form the 1st Canadian Motorcycle Regiment, CASF (RCD/LSH(RC)). It was redesignated as Lord Strathcona's Horse (Royal Canadians), CASF, on 21 September 1940; as the 2nd Armoured Regiment (Lord Strathcona's Horse (Royal Canadians)), CASF, on 11 February 1941; as the 2nd Armoured Regiment (Lord Strathcona's Horse (Royal Canadians)), CAC, CASF, on 15 October 1943; and as the 2nd Armoured Regiment (Lord Strathcona's Horse (Royal Canadians)), RCAC, CASF, on 2 August 1945. The regiment embarked for Britain on 13 November 1941 and landed in Italy on 8 November 1943, where it fought as part of the 5th Armoured Brigade, 5th Canadian Armoured Division. On 16 February 1945 the regiment moved with the I Canadian Corps to North-West Europe as part of Operation Goldflake, where it fought until the end of the war.

During the Second World War, the regiment mobilised an armoured regiment for overseas service, which joined the First Canadian Armoured Division (renamed the 5th Canadian Armoured Division). During an inspection in England, King George VI noticed that the divisional patches on the sleeves of the troopers bore the legend "LSH". He remarked to a Strathcona's officer that he had always thought the proper abbreviation of "Lord" was "Ld". The regiment promptly changed its formation patches and have used the correct designation ever since.

One of the many dramatic changes World War I introduced into military organisation and technology was the introduction of the tank, however, Canada would persist with horse cavalry until the Summer of 1940. The regiment did have a Ford and a Chevrolet armoured car, representing 50% of Canada's entire armoured strength at the start of the Second World War. In July 1940, LdSH(RC) along with The Royal Canadian Dragoons, were mobilized as the 1st Canadian Motorcycle Regiment. Later that year, the Strathcona's became 2nd Armoured Regiment, Lord Strathcona's Horse (Royal Canadians). The Regiment trained in England for two years with Canadian built Ram tanks and saw its first action in an armoured role in Italy.

One of the regiment's most noteworthy battles in Italy was the Melfa River Crossing. During this desperate battle the Strathcona RHQ reconnaissance troop established a bridgehead in conjunction with "A" Company, The Westminster Regiment (Motor) on the Melfa River and held it against determined German tank and infantry attacks until reinforcements could arrive. The action resulted in a Victoria Cross being awarded to the OC "A" Company, Major Jack Mahony and forged a long-standing association between the two regiments.

The advance up the boot of Italy bloodied the regiment but also forged their identity as a Canadian tank unit, second to none. The regiment left Italy in February 1945, and fought in the North West Europe campaign to liberate the Netherlands and the Lowlands. In 1946, the regiment returned to Canada and except for two operational tours in Germany, called Calgary its home garrison.

The overseas regiment was disbanded on 1 March 1946.

On 1 September 1945 a second Active Force component of the regiment was mobilized for service in the Pacific theatre of operations designated as the 2nd–2nd Armoured Car Regiment (Lord Strathcona's Horse (Royal Canadians)), RCAC, CASF. It was redesignated as the 2nd Armoured Regiment (Lord Strathcona's Horse (Royal Canadians)), RCAC, CASF) on 1 March 1946 and on 27 June 1946 it was embodied in the Permanent Force.

=== Post war to the present ===
During the Cold War, the regiment was deployed on several rotations to West Germany, and three squadrons fought in rotation in the Korean War as part of the 1st Commonwealth Division. Originally intended to be equipped with M-10 tank destroyers, the Strathconas in Korea went into action with M4A3E8 Sherman tanks. A, B and C Squadrons fought independently in Korea from 19 April 1951 to 27 July 1953 as part of the 25th Canadian Infantry Brigade Group, 1st Commonwealth Division. The squadrons were equipped with M4A3E8 Sherman tanks.

Lord Strathcona's Horse (Royal Canadians), along with The Royal Canadian Dragoons, contributed troops to 56 Reconnaissance Squadron for duty with the United Nations Emergency Force (UNEF) from March 1957 to January 1959, equipped with Ferret armoured cars. The battle captain, Captain Norman A. Shackleton, the 1st Troop leader, Lieutenant CC Van Straubenzee, and the 3rd Troop leader, Lieutenant F.G. Woodrow, as well as half of the NCOs and soldiers were Strathconas. Two members of 56 Reconnaissance Squadron died: Lieutenant Charles C. Van Straubenzee on 10 May 1957 and Trooper George E. McDavid on 29 Nov 1957. Other squadrons of the regiment served there and in Cyprus. Trooper Reginald J. Wiley died on UN duty in the Sinai on 7 September 1961. The Strathconas' last deployment to Cyprus took place from August 1988 to March 1989.

The regiment served two tours of duty in Germany as part of Canada's contribution to NATO, equipped with Centurion tanks.

During the 1990s, the regiment deployed to the Former Republic of Yugoslavia twice as part of the United Nations Protection Force (UNPROFOR) and once as part of NATO's Stabilization Force in Bosnia and Herzegovina (SFOR), largely equipped with the AVGP Cougar armoured car.

Other deployments include two six-month missions in Bosnia: 1994 with the United Nations and 1997 with NATO.

The Strathconas contributed several tank squadrons as well as reconnaissance personnel to the various Canadian task forces that served in Afghanistan from 2002 to 2014. Trooper Michael Yuki Hayakaze was killed in action in Afghanistan on 2 March 2008. In 2002 the Reconnaissance Squadron participated as part of the Canadian battle group during the U.S.-led invasion of Afghanistan. The squadron returned to Kabul, Afghanistan for a six-month rotation in 2004 as part of Canada's ongoing commitment to the International Security Assistance Force. Since September 2006, various squadrons of Lord Strathcona's Horse (Royal Canadians) served continuously in Afghanistan, forming the basis of every tank squadron to serve as part of Task Force Kandahar.

In 2000, to commemorate the centenary of its original foundation, a mounted detachment of eighteen members from Lord Strathcona's Horse (Royal Canadians) was invited to London, where, in ceremonial full-dress, they mounted the Queen's Life Guard at the Horse Guards on seven days between 8 and 23 September. This was a very great honour, as they were the first overseas unit to mount the Queen's Life Guard at the Horse Guards. This also occurred again in July 2025.

Freedom of the city was exercised by Lord Strathcona's Horse (Royal Canadians) in St. Albert, Alberta, on June 11, 2011. This was followed by the Freedom of the City being offered by Strathcona County in Sherwood Park, Alberta, on August 24, 2013.

== Regimental collect ==
In 2021 the following prayer written by Padre David Jackson (regimental chaplain from 2018 to 2020) was adopted as the official regimental collect of Lord Strathcona's Horse (Royal Canadians):

"Almighty God, who is our Mighty Fortress, grant to the Lord Strathcona’s Horse (Royal Canadians) that putting on the whole armour of God we may go forth through the earth eager to serve King and Country with courage, honour and loyalty. Strengthen and protect us in every peril; be with us in day of battle, and in time of peace keep us safe from all evil. Keep us ever mindful of former valour, and grant us grace, that whatever challenges and hardships we face, we may in all things persevere. May this Regiment serve as Your instrument for good, like a hammer that breaks the rock in pieces, shattering evil, and defending the righteous. In Your Holy Name. Amen."

== Alliances ==
- United Kingdom: The Royal Lancers (Queen Elizabeths' Own)
- Poland: 10th Armoured Cavalry Brigade (Bond of Friendship)

== Uniform ==
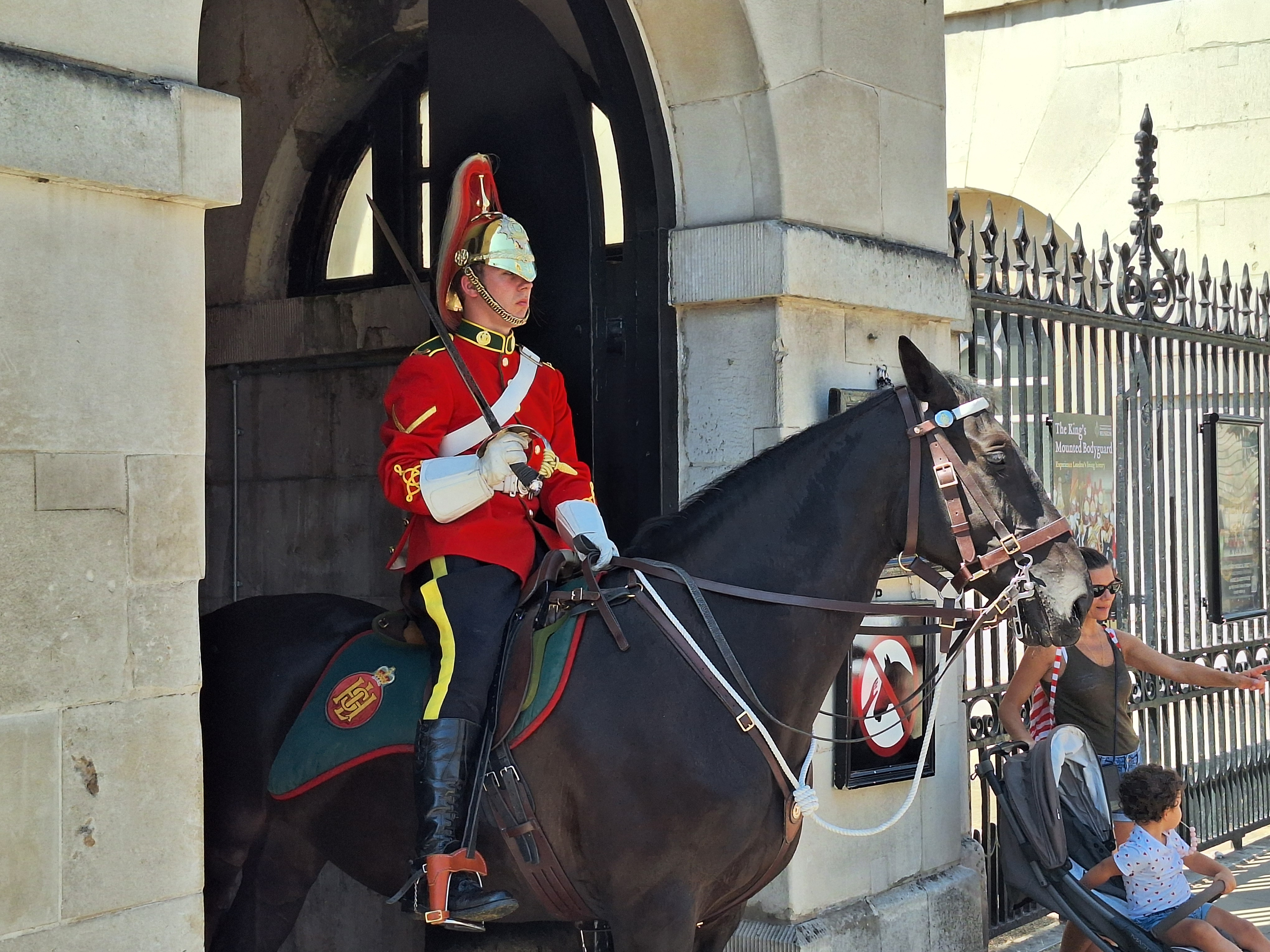
A mounted sentry in No. 1B dress posted outside Horse Guards in London

Full dress uniform (No. 1B dress)
Scarlet tunic with facings of myrtle green; headdress: dragoon helmet with red and white plume; tartan: ? (pipers' trews, later kilts)
Service dress (No. 3 dress)
Canadian Army pattern service dress, with collar badges (or "dogs") of the Strathcona coat of arms.

== Battle honours ==
In the list below, battle honours in capitals were awarded for participation in large operations and campaigns, while those in lowercase indicate honours granted for more specific battles. Those battle honours in bold type are emblazoned on the regimental guidon.

=== South African War ===
- **South Africa, 1900–1901**

=== Great War ===
- **Festubert, 1915** 15–25 May 15
- **Somme, 1916, '18** 1 July–18 November 1916 and 21 March–5 April 1918
- Bazentin 14–17 July 1916
- Pozières 23 July–3 September 1916
- Flers–Courcelette 15–22 September 1916
- **Cambrai, 1917, '18** 20 November 1917 – 3 December 1917 and 8–10 October 1918
- **St. Quentin** 21–23 March 1918
- **Amiens** 8–11 August 1918
- **Hindenburg Line** 12 September–9 October 1918
- **St. Quentin Canal** 29 September −2 October 1918
- **Beaurevoir**
- **Pursuit to Mons** 28 September–11 November 1918
- **France and Flanders, 1915–18**

=== Second World War ===
- **Liri Valley** 18–30 May 1944
- **Melfa Crossing** 24–25 May 1944
- **Torrice Crossroads** 30 May 1944
- **Gothic Line** 25 August–22 September 1944
- **Pozzo Alto Ridge** 31 August 1944
- **Coriano** 3–15 September 1944
- **Lamone Crossing** 2–13 September 1944
- Misano Ridge
- Casale 23–25 September 1944
- Naviglio Canal 12–15 December 1944
- Fosso Munio 19–21 December 1944
- **Italy, 1944–1945**
- **IJsselmeer** 15–18 April 1945
- **North-West Europe, 1945**

=== Korea ===
- **Korea, 1951–1953**

=== Afghanistan ===
- Afghanistan

== Victoria Crosses ==
- Lieutenant Gordon Muriel Flowerdew VC
- Lieutenant Frederick Maurice Watson Harvey VC, CBE, MC, Croix de Guerre
- Sergeant Arthur Herbert Lindsay Richardson, VC

== Ceremonial units ==
=== Mounted Troop ===
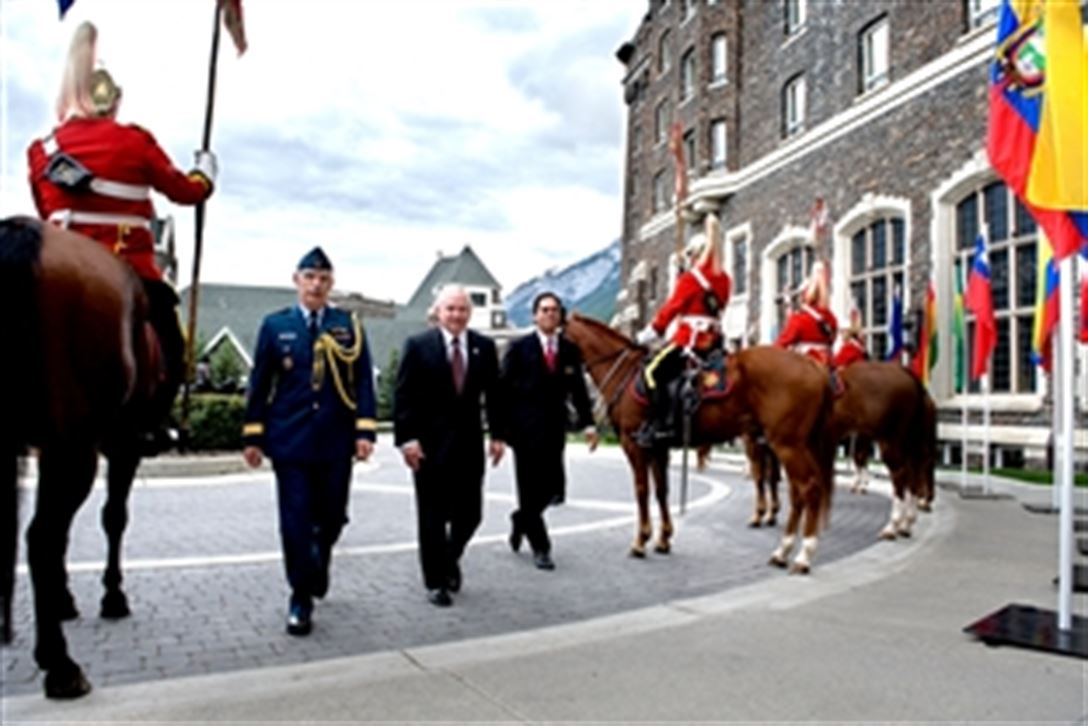
Members of the regiment's mounted troop (on horseback) providing a guard for US Defence Secretary Robert Gates in Banff.

The Strathcona Ceremonial Mounted Troop is the mounted ceremonial cavalry unit of the regiment. It is one of two military mounted troops in Canada. The other belongs to the Governor General's Horse Guards.

=== Pipes and Drums ===
Lord Strathcona's Horse is one of the few non-Canadian-Scottish regiments to maintain a pipe band. Although the 2nd Battalion, The Royal Canadian Regiment (2RCR), maintains the only pipes and drums in the regular army, Lord Strathcona's Horse also maintains its own pipes and drums. The difference between the two is that the 2RCR Pipes and Drums is funded directly by the Battalion, while the LdSH (RC) pipes and drums is funded by the regimental society. As such, the Strathcona Pipes and Drums is a voluntary band that consists of both members of the regiment and outside volunteers, all of whom serve in the authorized pipe band of the regiment. The pipes and drums was created in 1980 through the advocacy of Warrant Officer P. Peters, who acted as the unofficial regimental piper. In 1998, when the official Land Force Western Area Band was dissolved, Peters immediately formed a pipe band consisting of seven Strathconas to perform at regimental functions. Its first official appearance was at the Californian home of former Prime Minister of Canada Kim Campbell.

Since then, the pipe band has taken part in regimental events such as military parades and provincial state funerals in Edmonton. In 2000, major international events such as the 100th birthday of Queen Elizabeth The Queen Mother saw the band travel to South Africa, the Netherlands, and the United Kingdom. A year later, it performed at the celebrations Golden Jubilee of Elizabeth II in the U.K. In 2008, the operational activities of the regiment in Afghanistan resulted in a decision to cease all activities, an arrangement that lasted until it was reconstituted in 2011.

The following served as drum majors for the band:

- Warrant Officer Brian Talty (1999–2002)
- Warrant Officer K. Hepburn (2002–2004)
- Warrant Officer R. Stacey (2004–2005)
- Warrant Officer J. Hapgood (2005–2007)
- Warrant Officer A. Batty (2007–2008)
- Sergeant Patrick Stoyko (2013–2014)

The following served as pipe majors for the band:

- Warrant Officer Paul Peters (1998–2001)
- Master Corporal Al MacNeill (2001–2002)
- Master Corporal Marvin MacNeill (2002–2008)
- Warrant Officer Marvin MacNeill (2011–2013)
- Warrant Officer Cordell Boland (2013–present)

Despite the cavalry traditions of the regiment, the pipes and drums does not perform in full dress (No. 1B) uniform due to concerns of a confusion with the Strathcona Mounted Troop. In light of this, the regiment authorized a hybrid uniform (No. 1C) custom designed for the band. The band uniform consists of a midnight blue patrol jacket, kilts (in the official MacKenzie tartan) and a sporran that is similar to that of the Pipes and Drums of the Royal Tank Regiment.

=== Predecessors ===
One of the predecessors of the pipe band was the regimental brass and reed military band consisting of approximately 50 to 70 professional musicians during its 12-year existence from 1956 to 1968. The band was one of seventeen joint-service bands to take part in the 1967 Canadian Armed Forces Tattoo celebrating the Canadian Centennial of that year. Allan Rae, a Canadian composer who was known most notably for being a former board member of the Canadian League of Composers, was a member of the band in the 70s. Derek Stannard, who later became the director of the Central Band of the Canadian Armed Forces, also was a member of this band. In the wake of its disbandment, a voluntary drum and bugle corps was established by Warrant Officer Mucker Langan in 1971, whose volunteers primary duties were with the regiment's Assault Troop. Both of these bands performed in the regimental full dress uniform, all of which were transferred to the Ceremonial Mounted Troop in 1974.

== Regimental Museum and Archives ==
The Regimental Museum and Archives are at The Military Museums in Calgary, Alberta. The museum has a static gallery of 230 square metres (2,500 ft^{2}) that tells the history of the regiment from 1900 to present, with a rotating selection of special exhibits and displays. The regimental collection holds thousands of artifacts and relics, while the archives has photographs, records, documents and diaries with which it conducts research for personal and professional institutions around the world. The museum is staffed by full-time Regular Force soldiers, as of 2023 a captain, a sergeant and a corporal, with additional volunteers assisting in research, outreach and design.

On average, the museum hosts approximately 40,000 visitors annually and educates the public with stories of cavalry history and traditions from Western Canada's only Regular Force armoured unit. The LdSH(RC) Museum and Archives are mandated to assist the public-at-large with research on their family connections to the regiment as well as to perform educational outreach to the regiment, its members and the city of Calgary. Participating in displays at Spruce Meadows, Canada Day and the Calgary Stampede, members from the LdSH(RC) Museum are familiar sight around Calgary and they aim to educate, train and inform the public about the history of the regiment.

== Cadets ==
There are several Royal Canadian Army Cadets units spread across Alberta, British Columbia and the Northwest Territories which are affiliated to Lord Strathcona's Horse (Royal Canadians). Cadets are not soldiers; they are part of an organization dedicated to developing citizenship and leadership among young men and women aged 12 to 18 years of age with a military flavour, and are not required to join the Canadian Forces.

Corps	Location
1292 RCACC	Calgary, Alberta
1813 RCACC	Cranbrook, BC
2716 RCACC	Mayerthorpe, Alberta
2860 RCACC	Fort Simpson, NWT
2952 RCACC	Grande Cache, Alberta
3066 RCACC	Golden, BC
3070 RCACC	Evansburg, Alberta

Cadet units affiliated to the LdSH(RC) receive support and also are entitled to wear traditional regimental accoutrements on their uniforms.

== Lineage ==
- Originated 1 July 1901 in Winnipeg, Manitoba, as an independent Permanent Active Militia corps of mounted rifles, designated as A Squadron, The Canadian Mounted Rifles
- Redesignated 1 October 1903 as The Royal Canadian Mounted Rifles
- Redesignated 1 October 1909 as Strathcona's Horse (Royal Canadians)
- Redesignated 1 May 1911 as Lord Strathcona's Horse (Royal Canadians)
- Redesignated 16 October 1946 as the 2nd Armoured Regiment (Lord Strathcona's Horse (Royal Canadians)), RCAC
- Redesignated 2 March 1949 as Lord Strathcona's Horse (Royal Canadians) (2nd Armoured Regiment)
- Redesignated 19 May 1958 as Lord Strathcona's Horse (Royal Canadians)

=== Lineage chart ===
Lineage chart

1900	Strathcona’s Horse
1901	Disbanded	A Sqn, The CMR
1903	The Royal CMR
1909	Strathcona’s Horse (Royal Canadians)
1911	Lord Strathcona’s Horse (Royal Canadians)
1914	The Lord Strathcona’s Horse (Royal Canadians), CEF
1920	Disbanded
1940	1st Canadian Motorcycle Regt, CASF (RCD/LSH(RC))
1940	Lord Strathcona’s Horse (Royal Canadians), CASF
1941	2nd Armd Regt (Lord Strathcona’s Horse (Royal Canadians)), CASF
1943	2nd Armd Regt (Lord Strathcona’s Horse (Royal Canadians)), CAC, CASF
1945	2nd Armd Regt (Lord Strathcona’s Horse (Royal Canadians)), RCAC, CASF	2nd-2nd Armd Car Regt (Lord Strathcona’s Horse (Royal Canadians)), RCAC, CASF
1946	Disbanded	2nd Armd Regt (Lord Strathcona’s Horse (Royal Canadians)), RCAC, CASF)
1946	Incorporated in Permanent Force	2nd Armd Regt (Lord Strathcona’s Horse (Royal Canadians)), RCAC
1949	Lord Strathcona’s Horse (Royal Canadians) (2nd Armd Regt)
1950	A Sqn, 1st/2nd Canadian Armd Regt, RCAC, CASF	B Sqn, Lord Strathcona's Horse (Royal Canadians) 2nd Armd Regt, RCAC, CASF
1951	C Sqn, Lord Strathcona's Horse (Royal Canadians), 2nd Armd Regt, RCAC, CASF
1952	Ceased to be embodied in CASF
1953	Ceased to be embodied in CASF	A Sqn, Lord Strathcona's Horse (Royal Canadians) 2nd Armd Regt, RCAC, CASF
1953	Ceased to be embodied in CASF
1958	Lord Strathcona’s Horse (Royal Canadians)

== Perpetuation ==
=== South Africa ===
- Strathcona's Horse of 1900–1901

== Order of precedence ==
Preceded by The Royal Canadian Dragoons	Lord Strathcona's Horse (Royal Canadians)	Succeeded by 12^{e} Régiment blindé du Canada

== See also ==
- List of regiments of cavalry of the Canadian Militia (1900–1920)
- List of mounted regiments in the Canadian Expeditionary Force
- The Canadian Crown and the Canadian Forces
- Horses in World War I

== Media ==
- Lord Strathcona's Horse (Royal Canadians) : A Pictorial History by Ian D. Barnes; Henry, Sean A.; Snell, Mike J. (2005)
- Lord Strathcona's Horse (Royal Canadians) A Record of Achievement by Lieutenant-Colonel J. M. McAvity (Jan 1 1947)
- The story of a regiment: Lord Strathcona's Horse (Royal Canadians) (Strathcona historical series)
- Strathcona's Horse : South Africa, 1900–1901 by Lord Strathcona's Horse (Royal Canadians) Regimental Society (1971)
- Stand to Your Horses - Through the First World War 1914–1918 with Lord Strathcona's Horse (Royal Canadians) by Captain S. H. Williams, MC (1961)
