= Arthur Herbert Lindsay Richardson =

Recipient of the Victoria Cross

Arthur Herbert Lindsay Richardson VC
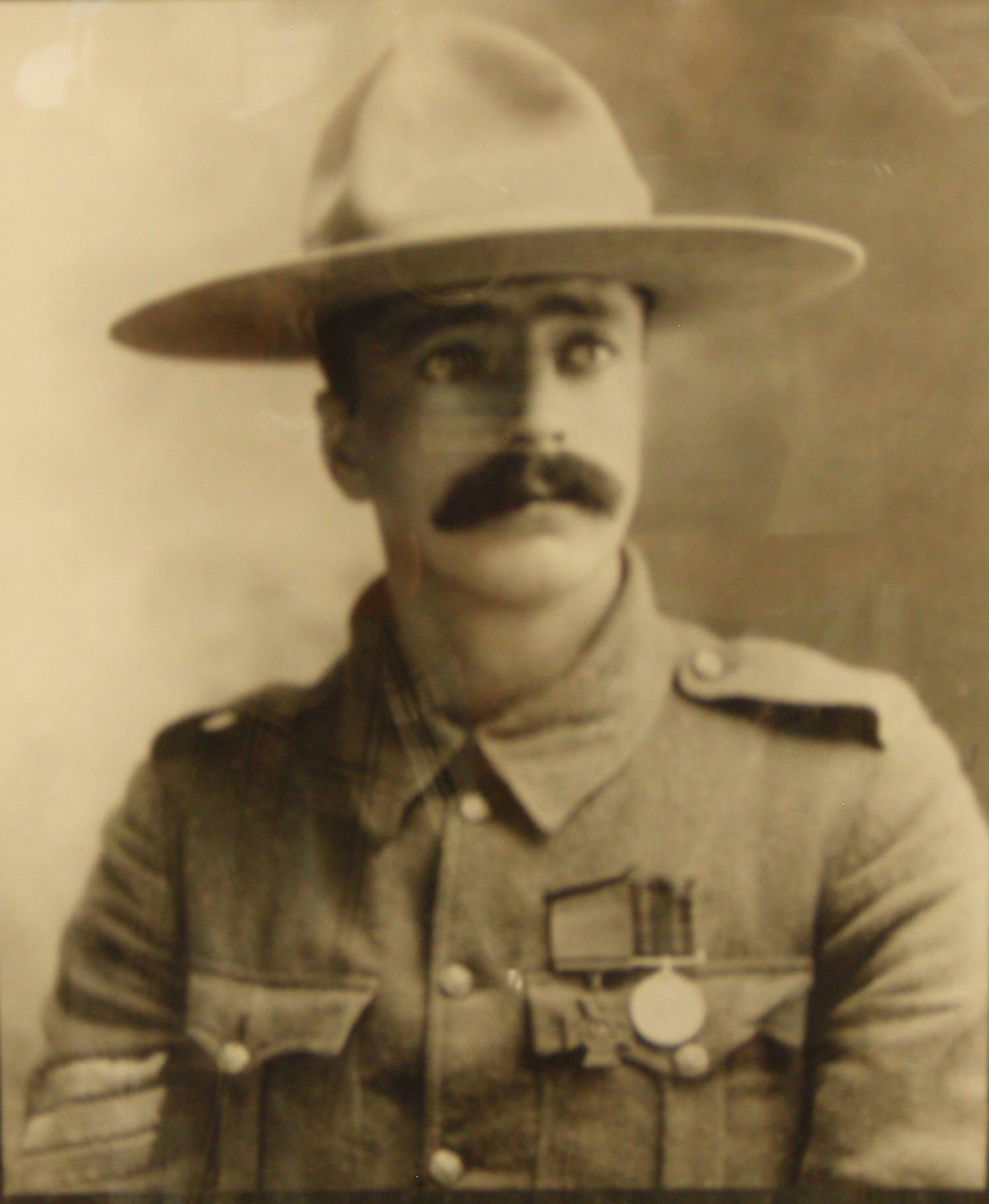
- Born: 23 September 1872; Southport, Lancashire, England
- Died: 15 December 1932 (aged 60); Liverpool, England
- Burial place: St James's Cemetery, Liverpool
- Military career
- Allegiance: British Empire
- Branch: Canadian Army
- Service years: 1900–1902
- Rank: Sergeant
- Units: Strathcona's Horse
- Conflicts: Second Boer War
- Awards: Victoria Cross
- Other work: Royal Canadian Mounted Police Officer

Arthur Herbert Lindsay Richardson VC (23 September 1872 – 15 December 1932) was an England-born Canadian recipient of the Victoria Cross, the highest and most prestigious award for gallantry in the face of the enemy that can be awarded to British and Commonwealth forces.

== Details ==
Born in Southport, Lancashire, in 1872, Richardson emigrated to Canada in 1891. After a period as a rancher, he joined the North-West Mounted Police in 1894. He was stationed in Prince Albert in 1899. After the outbreak of the Second Boer War, in 1900 he joined the newly raised Strathcona's Horse.

Richardson was 27 years old and a sergeant when the deed, for which he was awarded the VC, took place. The VC was announced in the London Gazette on 14 September 1900, four months before the death of Queen Victoria. The medal was presented to him by King Edward VII at the first presentation of VCs after the King ascended the throne. Richardson was the third of three VCs presented with their medals on 12 March 1901 at St James' Palace.

The commander of his unit, Lieutenant Agar Adamson, reported:

On the 5th July, 1900, at Wolve Spruit, about 15 miles north of Standerton, a party of Lord Strathcona's Corps, only 38 in number, came into contact, and was engaged at close quarters, with a force of 80 of the enemy. When the order to retire had been given, Sergeant Richardson rode back under a very heavy cross-fire and picked up a trooper whose horse had been shot and who was wounded in two places and rode with him out of fire. At the time when this act of gallantry was performed, Sergeant Richardson was within 300 yards of the enemy, and was himself riding a wounded horse.

Richardson was the first member of a Canadian unit awarded the Victoria Cross.

He re-joined the NWMP in 1902 and served until ill health forced him to retire in 1907. After his wife's death in 1916, Richardson returned to Liverpool and died there in 1932.

== The medal ==
His Victoria Cross is displayed at Canadian War Museum in Ottawa, Ontario. His gravestone can be seen at the Liverpool Cathedral St. James Gardens.

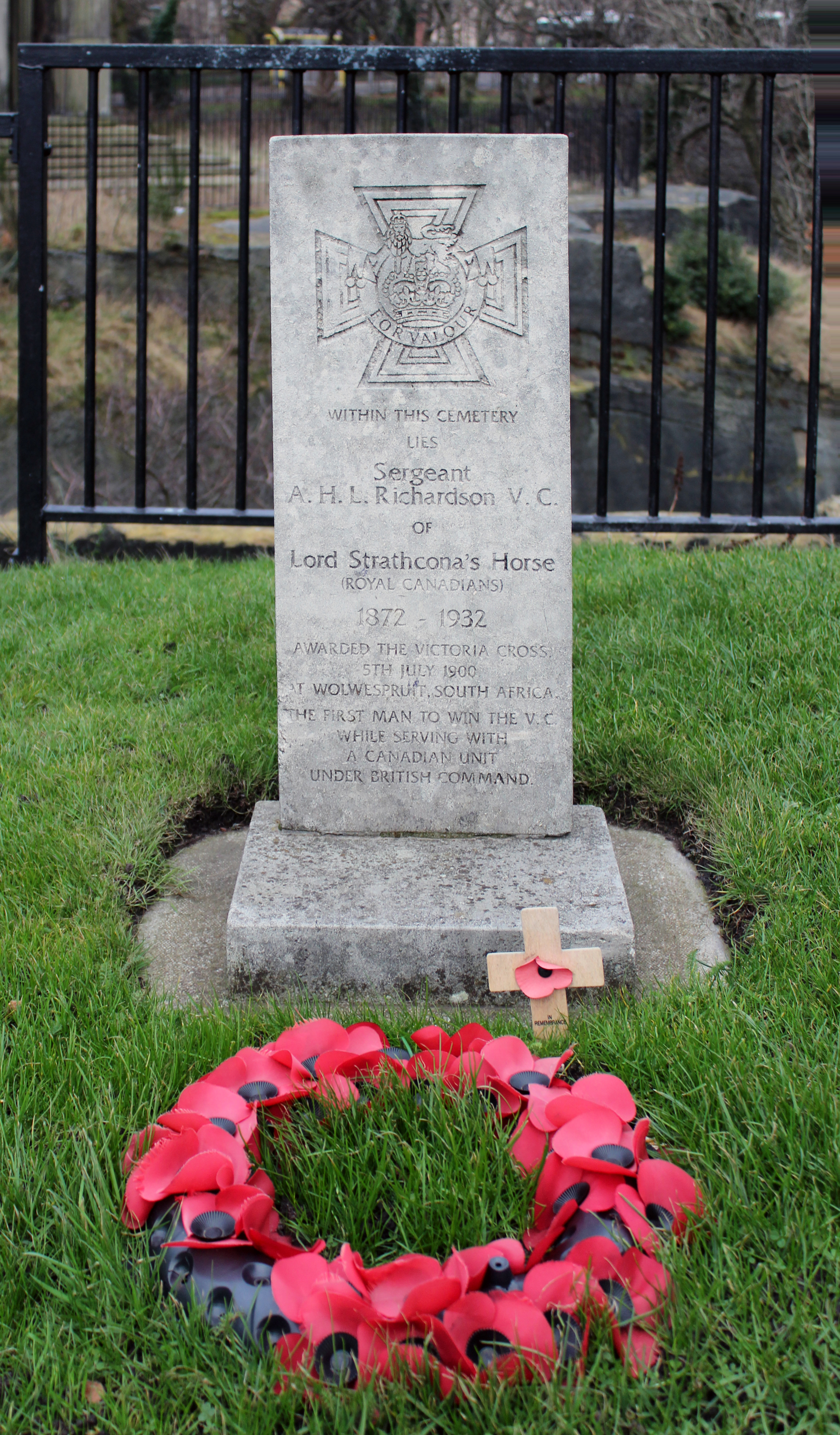
Memorial at Liverpool Anglican Cathedral

== See also ==
- List of Canadian Victoria Cross recipients
