= Kutkivtsi =

Rural locality in Khmelnytskyi Oblast, Ukraine

Kutkivtsi Кутківці
- Village
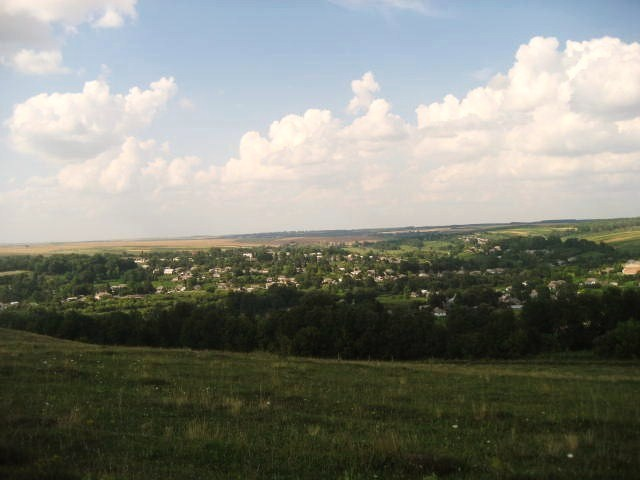
- Interactive map of Kutkivtsi
- Coordinates: 49°8′N 26°22′E
- Country: Ukraine
- Oblast: Khmelnytskyi Oblast
- Raion: Kamianets-Podilskyi Raion

Area
  - Total: 369.13 km^{2} (142.52 sq mi)
- Elevation: 319 m (1,047 ft)

Population
  - Total: ▼1,106
- Website: Ukrainian Parliament page

Kutkivtsi (Ukrainian: Кутківці, Russian: Кутковцы, translit. Kutkovtsy; also referred to as Kudkiv or Kutkiw) is a village (selo) in Kamianets-Podilskyi Raion of Khmelnytskyi Oblast in western Ukraine. It belongs to Zakupne settlement hromada, one of the hromadas of Ukraine. Kutkivtsi is located around 49°8′N 26°22′E.

Kutkivtsi is the birthplace of Ukrainian-Canadian war hero Filip Konowal (Pylyp Konoval).

Until 18 July 2020, Kutkivtsi belonged to Chemerivtsi Raion. The raion was abolished in July 2020 as part of the administrative reform of Ukraine, which reduced the number of raions of Khmelnytskyi Oblast to three. The area of Chemerivtsi Raion was merged into Kamianets-Podilskyi Raion.
