= John Keefer Mahony =

Canadian Army major (1911–1990)

Lieutenant Colonel John 'Jack' Keefer Mahony VC
- Born: 30 June 1911; New Westminster, British Columbia
- Died: 15 December 1990 (aged 79); London, Ontario
- Military career
- Allegiance: Canada
- Branch: Canadian Army
- Rank: Lieutenant colonel
- Units: The Westminster Regiment
- Conflicts: World War II
- Awards: Victoria Cross

John Keefer Mahony VC (30 June 1911 – 15 December 1990) was a Canadian recipient of the Victoria Cross, the highest and most prestigious award for gallantry in the face of the enemy that can be awarded to British and Commonwealth forces.

== Details ==
Mahony was born in New Westminster, British Columbia and was 32 years old, and a major in The Westminster Regiment, Canadian Infantry Corps, during the Second World War when the following deed took place for which he was awarded the VC.

On 24 May 1944 at the River Melfa, Italy, Mahony and his company were ordered to establish the initial bridgehead over the river. This was accomplished in conjunction with the tanks of Lord Strathcona's Horse (Royal Canadians) and for five hours the company maintained its position in the face of enemy fire and attack until the remaining companies and supporting weapons were able to reinforce them. Early in the action Mahony was wounded in the head and twice in the leg, but he refused medical aid and continued to direct the defence of the bridgehead. The enemy saw that this officer was the soul of the defence and consequently made him their particular target.

In May 1951 Canada raised 27th Infantry Brigade to meet commitments for NATO continental defence. Lt-Col J.K. Mahoney, V.C. was named commanding officer of 1 Cdn Inf Bn one of three infantry battalions, but due to ill health relinquished command in July 1951. Mahony retired from the army in 1962.

Mahony died on 15 December 1990 in London, Ontario.

Mount Mahony near Powell River, British Columbia, is named after him.
