= 30th Battalion, CEF =

Canadian infantry battalion

The 30th Battalion, CEF was an infantry battalion of the Canadian Expeditionary Force during the Great War.

== History ==
The 30th Battalion was authorized on 27 October 1914 and embarked for Britain on 23 February 1915. It was redesignated as the 30th Reserve Battalion, CEF on 18 April 1915 to provide reinforcements for the Canadian Corps in the field. On 4 January 1917 its personnel were absorbed by the 1st Reserve Battalion, CEF. The battalion was subsequently disbanded on 1 September 1917.

The 30th Battalion recruited in British Columbia and was mobilized at Victoria. The 30th battalion had three Officers Commanding:

- Lt.-Col. J.A. Hall, 26 February 1915 – 9 June 1915
- Lt.-Col. C.F. De Salis, 10 June 1915 – 6 November 1915
- Lt.-Col. S. Booth, 7 November 1915 – 2 January 1917

The 30th Battalion was awarded the battle honour THE GREAT WAR 1915-1917.

The 30th Battalion had soldier David Alfred Morrison as one of the soldiers.

== Perpetuation ==
The 30th Battalion, CEF, is perpetuated by The British Columbia Regiment (Duke of Connaught's Own).

== See also ==
- List of infantry battalions in the Canadian Expeditionary Force

== Sources ==
- Canadian Expeditionary Force 1914-1919 by Col. G. W. L. Nicholson, CD, Queen's Printer, Ottawa, Ontario, 1962
