= Filip Konowal =

Ukrainian Canadian soldier and recipient of the Victoria Cross

Filip Konowal VC
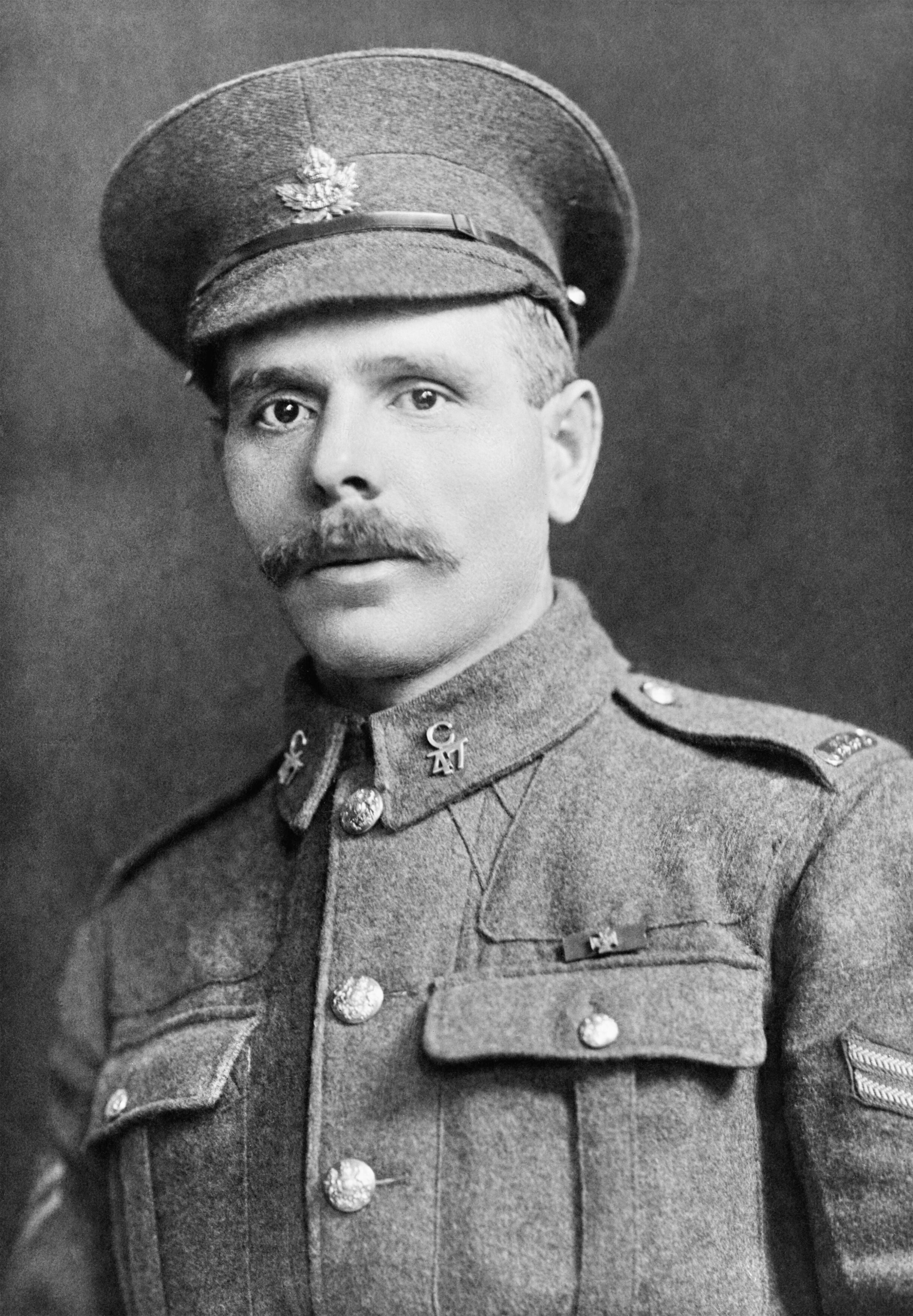
- Born: 25 March 1887; Kutkivtsi, Podolia Governorate, Russian Empire (now Ukraine)
- Died: 3 June 1959 (aged 72); Hull, Quebec, Canada
- Military career
- Allegiance: Russian Empire; Canada
- Service years: 1909–1913 (Russia); 1915–1919 (Canada)
- Rank: Sergeant
- Units: 77th Canadian Infantry Battalion; 47th (British Columbia) Battalion Canadian Infantry; 1st Canadian Reserve Battalion; Canadian Forestry Corps; Canadian Siberian Expeditionary Force; Governor General's Foot Guards
- Conflicts: World War I; Battle of Hill 70; Russian Civil War; Siberian Intervention
- Awards: Victoria Cross; Cross of St George, 4th Class
- Other work: special custodian in the Office of the Prime Minister

Filip Konowal VC (Ukrainian: Пилип Миронович Коновал, romanized: Pylyp Myronovych Konoval; 25 March 1887 – 3 June 1959) was a highly decorated Ukrainian Canadian soldier. He is the first Canadian Corps member not born in the British Empire (and the only Ukrainian) to be awarded the Victoria Cross, the highest award for gallantry in the face of the enemy given to British and Commonwealth forces. He was also entitled to the Cross of St George, 4th Class.

He is the patron of Royal Canadian Legion Branch 360 (Konowal Branch) in Toronto.

== First World War ==
Konowal was born to a peasant family on 25 March 1887 in Kutkivtsi, in the Podolia Governorate of the Russian Empire (now Ukraine) near the border with Austria-Hungary. At an early age, he worked as a mason alongside his father. He married Hanna (?-1932/33) in 1908. They had a daughter, Marichka.

Soon after his marriage, he decided to join the Imperial Russian Army, where he served as an instructor in hand-to-hand combat. After demobilization, Konowal returned home and took up work as a feller in Siberia, before accepting a job with a Canadian company in 1913. Departing from Vladivostok, Konowal crossed the Pacific Ocean to Vancouver, British Columbia, and continued working as a feller, gradually making his way east. By the beginning of 1914, Konowal had lost his job as a feller and ended up working a series of odd jobs until the outbreak of World War I.

On 12 July 1915, Konowal enlisted in the 77th Canadian Infantry Battalion, and on 19 June 1916, left Halifax for Liverpool. After arriving in England, Konowal was promoted to acting corporal and was transferred to the 47th (British Columbia) Battalion of the 4th Canadian Division. In August 1916, the 4th Division arrived in France, and took part in the assault on Vimy Ridge in April 1917. From 22 to 24 August 1917, during the Battle of Hill 70 in Lens, France, he was recognized for conspicuous gallantry in the face of the enemy and awarded the Victoria Cross. Konowal's medal was personally presented by King George V, and he was promoted to sergeant.

=== Victoria Cross citation ===
The citation was published in a supplement to the London Gazette of 23 November 1917 (dated 26 November 1917):

No. 144039 A./Cpl. Filip Konowal, Can. Inf.

For most conspicuous bravery and leadership when in charge of a section in attack. His section had the difficult task of mopping up cellars, craters and machine-gun emplacements. Under his able direction all resistance was overcome successfully, and heavy casualties inflicted on the enemy. In one cellar he himself bayonetted three enemy and attacked single-handed seven others in a crater, killing them all.

On reaching the objective, a machine-gun was holding up the right flank, causing many casualties. Cpl. Konowal rushed forward and entered the emplacement, killed the crew, and brought the gun back to our lines.

The next day he again attacked single-handed another machine-gun emplacement, killed three of the crew, and destroyed the gun and emplacement with explosives.

This non-commissioned officer alone killed at least sixteen of the enemy, and during the two days' actual fighting carried on continuously his good work until severely wounded.

== Post-war ==
On 19 July 1919, Konowal accompanied Leontiy Diedek, a friend and fellow veteran, to a particularly rough area in Hull, Quebec. The two men went for dinner at a restaurant; Diedek left early in order to look at some bicycles at the home of William Artich, an 'Austrian' bootlegger and bicycle salesman. Konowal became aware of a commotion and went to investigate. A fight had started between Artich and Diedek. By the time Konowal arrived, Diedek had been viciously beaten and Artich was armed with a knife. Konowal managed to gain control over the weapon and killed Artich with a single stab to the chest. Konowal did not attempt to flee the scene; when police came, the First World War veteran stated, "I've killed fifty-two of them, that makes the fifty-third."

Veterans rallied to his cause and raised enough money to bail Konowal in October 1919; the trial ended up being postponed three times, finally beginning in 1921. After extensive tests, it was discovered that Konowal had serious medical problems stemming from his war wounds: pressure on his brain was increasing and his condition was continually deteriorating. Medical experts unanimously agreed that a wartime gunshot wound to the head was likely making Konowal mentally unstable, causing flashbacks to the war's battles. The jury agreed and he was found not guilty by reason of insanity, then institutionalized for seven years. By the end of this period, his condition had improved dramatically, and he was released from a Montreal mental hospital in 1928.

He eventually found employment as a caretaker at the House of Commons in Ottawa, with the help of a military associate. When Prime Minister William Lyon Mackenzie King saw the colours of a Victoria Cross ribbon on Konowal while he was at work, King arranged for him to be reassigned to a lifetime job in King's personal office.

Unfortunately, tragedy struck once again when Konowal attempted to contact his family: his wife had died during the Soviet famine of 1932–1933 (the Holodomor) and his daughter was nowhere to be found, though it was later reported she survived and left descendants. Konowal married a French-Canadian woman, Juliette Leduc-Auger (1901–1987), in 1934 and adopted her two sons, Roland and Albert.

In 1956, he joined 300 other Victoria Cross recipients in London for events celebrating the honour's centennial, hosted by then British Prime Minister Anthony Eden and Queen Elizabeth II.

Konowal died in 1959 at Hull, Quebec, aged 72. He was buried at Notre Dame de Lourdes Cemetery, Ottawa, under a headstone in section A, lot 502.

== Honours ==
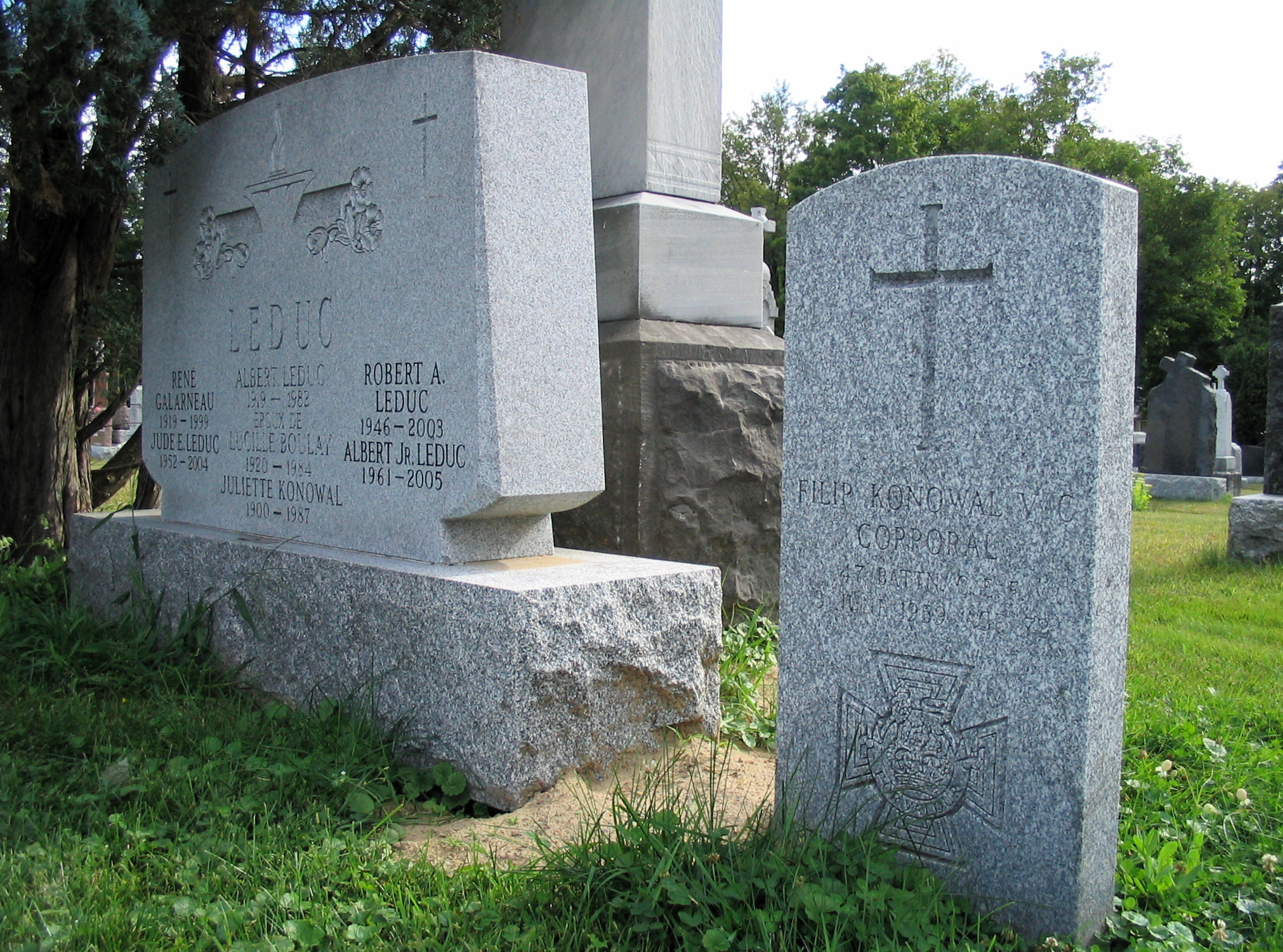
Filip Konowal's standard Commonwealth War Graves Commission gravestone, adjacent to his wife Juliette's family monument. It is inscribed "Filip Konowal V·C / Corporal / 47 Battn C·E·F / 3 June 1959 Age 72", with a simple Christian cross above and the Victoria Cross below.

In addition to the Victoria Cross, he was also awarded the British War Medal (1914–1920), Victory Medal (1914–1919), George VI Coronation Medal (1937), Elizabeth II Coronation Medal (1953), and was entitled to the Cross of St George, 4th Class, from Russia.

The Royal Canadian Legion Branch 360 (Konowal Branch) in Toronto made him its patron in 1953.

In 1996, Konowal's headstone was replaced by an upright marker, and memorial plaques were unveiled:

- in the Cartier Square drill hall of the Governor General's Foot Guards in Ottawa
- at St. John the Baptist Ukrainian Catholic Church, 952 Green Valley Crescent in Ottawa
- at Legion Branch 360 (Konowal Branch) in Toronto – transferred to the care of the Ukrainian National Federation, Toronto Branch in 2007 after Branch No. 360 was shut down by Dominion Command
- at the Royal Westminster Regiment's armoury (Konowal's regiment) in New Westminster, B.C – stolen since replaced with a stone marker
- on a cairn at Selo Ukraina Memorial Park, near Dauphin, Manitoba.
- in 2000, at Konowal's place of birth, Kutkivtsi, Ukraine.
- On 22 August 2005, a bas relief of Konowal was unveiled at Lens, France
- On 8 April 2017 the Battle of Hill 70 Memorial was unveiled at Loos-en-Gohelle, France, the central pathway named the Konowal Walk.

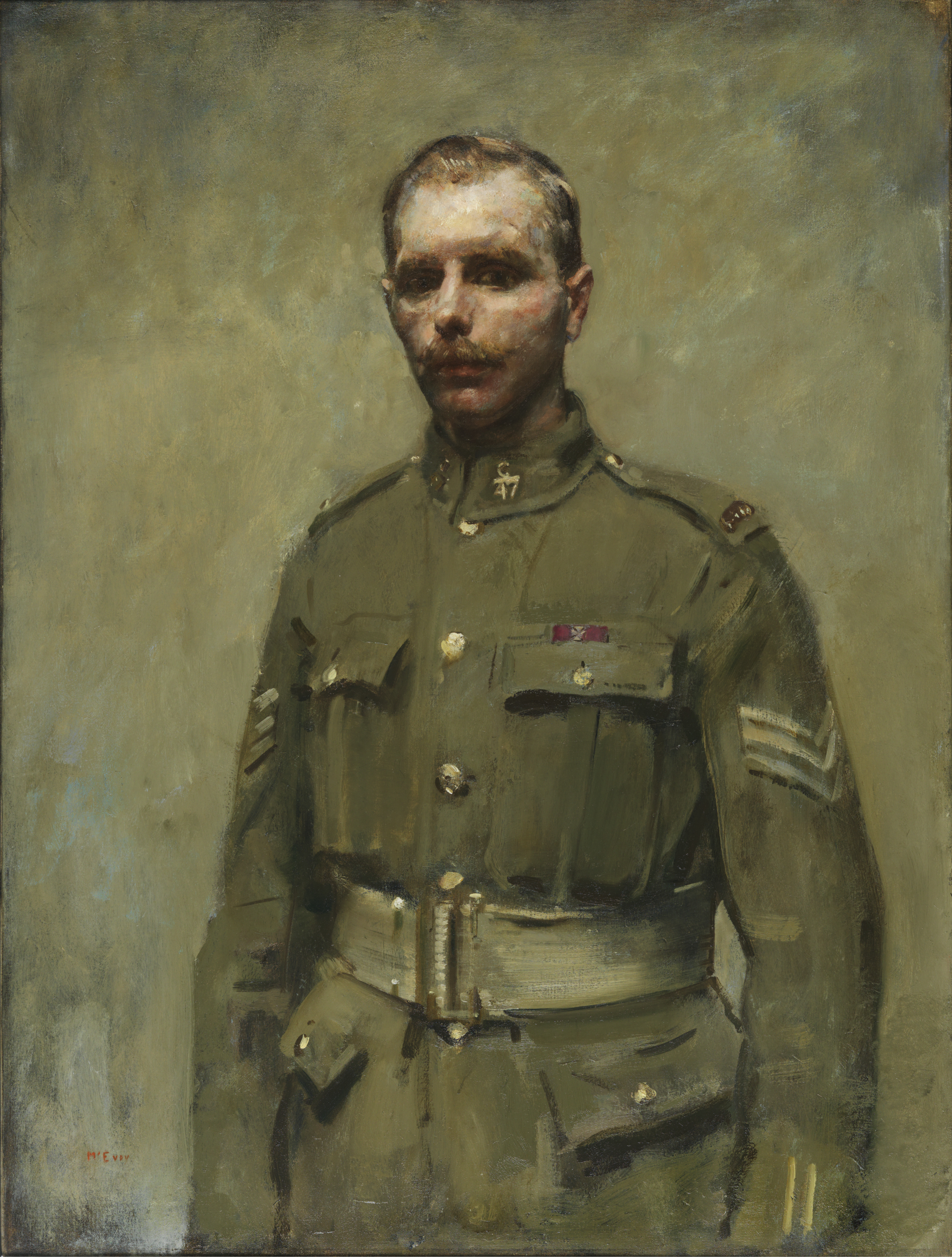
Portrait commissioned for the Beaverbrook Collection of War Art

- On 10 May 2017, a feature documentary on Filip Konowal's life, Konowal: the man behind the medal, was premiered on Documentary Channel (Canada). It was produced and directed by James Motluk and received a Platinum Remi Award at the Houston Worldfest 2017

== The Victoria Cross decoration ==
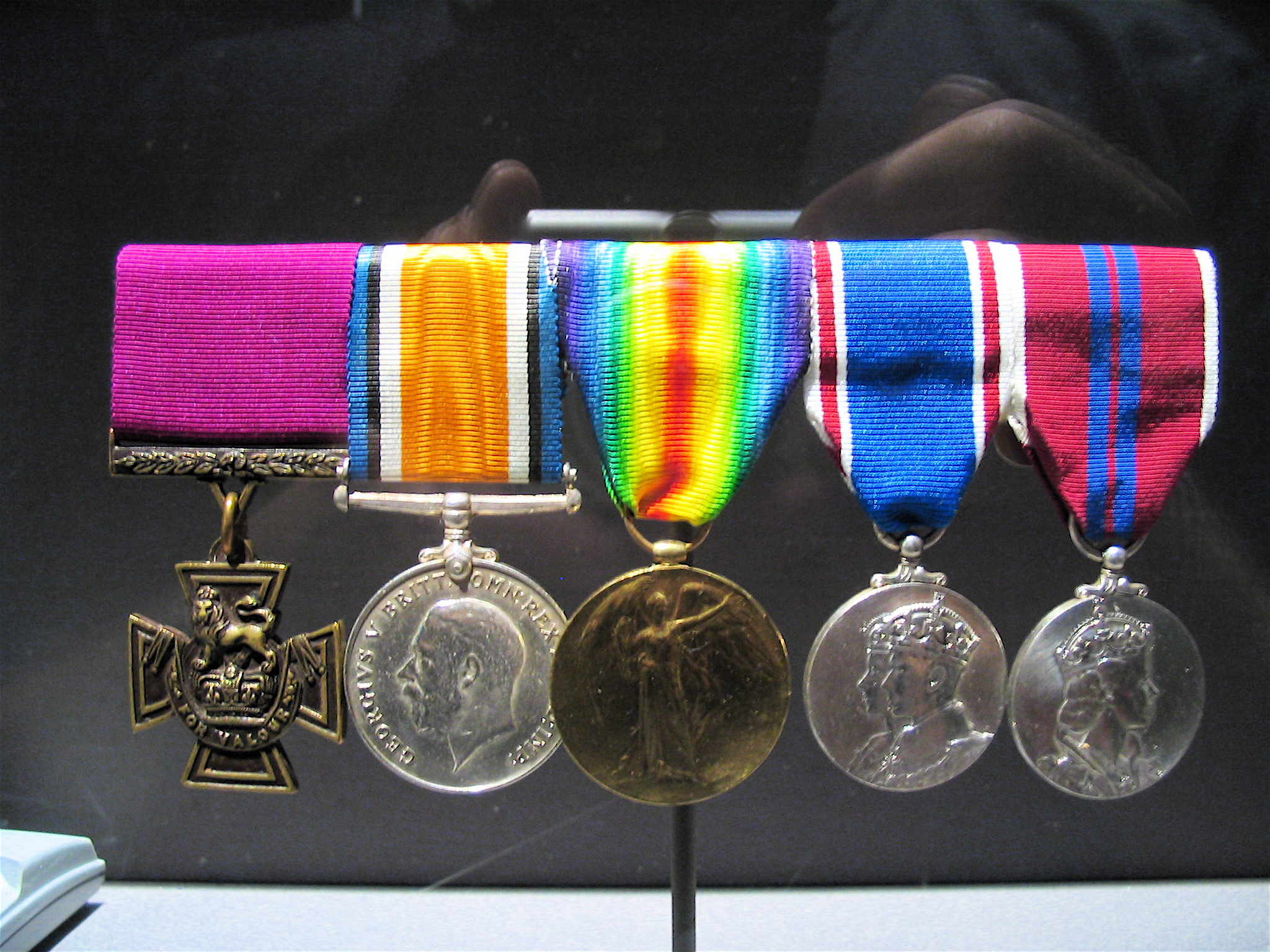
Konowal's medals at the Canadian War Museum. From the left: the Victoria Cross, British War Medal, Victory Medal, George VI Coronation Medal, Elizabeth II Coronation Medal

The Canadian War Museum in Ottawa purchased Konowal's Victoria Cross and other medals in 1969.

The decoration went missing sometime in the 1970s, apparently stolen, and was sold to an antique shop along with some Hawaiian coins in the mid-1990s. The shop owner believed the decoration was a fake, as it was inscribed with "For Valour" – evidently not realizing that all VCs awarded to Canadians had the English motto. (The source of confusion was that a new Canadian VC was introduced into the Canadian Honours System in 1993, bearing the Latin motto Pro Valore). The decoration was rediscovered when the shop owner offered it to the Jeffrey Hoare Auction House in London, Ontario in April 2004. A British collector discovered the auction and notified Lubomyr Luciuk, co-author of a booklet about Konowal, who took steps to have the decoration secured. It was recovered by the police and returned to permanent display at the War Museum on 23 August 2004, 87 years after it was awarded.

== Bibliography ==
- Imperial War Museum (2022). "Corporal Filip Konowal". Imperial War Museum.
- Lubomyr Y. Luciuk and Ron Sorobey. Konowal: a Canadian Hero, 2nd ed. Kingston, Ontario: Kashtan Press for the Royal Canadian Legion Branch 360, 2000. ISBN 1-896354-24-6.
- Mitch Potter (13 October 2007) "Village honours our valiant soldier: Victoria Cross winner in WWI never learned Ukrainian wife, child survived Stalin's purges". TheStar.com. URL accessed 13 October 2007.
- Ron Sorobey. Filip Konowal, VC: The Rebirth of a Canadian Hero.
- Lubomyr Luciuk, "A Canadian Hero: Corporal Filip Konowal, VC and the Battle of Hill 70," Kingston, Ontario: Kashtan Press, 2017. ISBN 978-0-9694125-8-8.
- Gliddon, Gerald (2004) [2012]. VCs of the First World War: Cambrai 1917. The History Press. ISBN 978-0-75-247668-1.
