= Vancouver Regiment =

The Vancouver Regiment
- Active: 1924-1936
- Country: Canada
- Branch: Canadian Militia
- Type: Line Infantry
- Role: Infantry
- Size: One Regiment
- Part of: Non-Permanent Active Militia
- Garrison/HQ: Vancouver, British Columbia
- Engagements: First World War
- Battle honours: See #Battle Honours

The Vancouver Regiment was an infantry regiment of the Non-Permanent Active Militia of the Canadian Militia (now the Canadian Army). The regiment was formed in 1924 when the 1st British Columbia Regiment (Duke of Connaught's Own) was Reorganized into three separate regiments. In 1936, the regiment was Amalgamated with The Irish Fusiliers of Canada to form The Irish Fusiliers of Canada (The Vancouver Regiment) (now part of The British Columbia Regiment (Duke of Connaught's Own)).

== Lineage of the Vancouver Regiment ==
- Originated on 15 May, 1924, in Vancouver, British Columbia, when the 1st British Columbia Regiment (Duke of Connaught's Own) was Reorganized into three separate regiments: the 1st British Columbia Regiment (Duke of Connaught's Own), The Westminster Regiment; and The Vancouver Regiment.
- Amalgamated on 1 June, 1936, with The Irish Fusiliers of Canada and Redesignated as the Irish Fusiliers (Vancouver Regiment) (later The Irish Fusiliers of Canada (Vancouver Regiment)).

== Perpetuations ==
- 29th Battalion, (Vancouver), CEF
- 158th Battalion (The Duke of Connaught's Own), CEF

== Organization ==
The Vancouver Regiment (15 May, 1924)

- 1st Battalion (redesignation of the 2nd Battalion, 1st British Columbia Regiment - perpetuating the 29th Battalion, CEF)
- 2nd (Reserve) Battalion (redesignation of the 5th Battalion, 1st British Columbia Regiment - perpetuating the 158th Battalion, CEF)

== Battle honours ==
- Mount Sorrel
- Somme, 1916, '18 (Note: Selected to be borne on colours and appointments)
- Flers-Courcelette
- Thiepval
- Ancre Heights
- Arras, 1917, '18
- Vimy, 1917
- Scarpe, 1917, '18
- Hill 70
- Ypres, 1917
- Passchendaele
- Amiens
- Drocourt-Quéant
- Hindenburg Line
- Canal du Nord
- Cambrai, 1918
- Pursuit to Mons
- France and Flanders, 1915–18
