= Lett =

Lett may refer to:

- Lett, archaic word for a Latvian
  - Lettish, another name for the Latvian language
- Lett's Brewery (officially Mill Park Brewery), a brewery based in Enniscorthy, County Wexford, Ireland

Lett as a surname may refer to the following:

- Alleyne Lett (born 1983), Grenadian decathlete
- Barbara Lett-Simmons (1927–2012), American politician
- Benjamin Lett (1813–1858), Irish-Canadian filibusterer
- Dan Lett, Canadian actor
- David Lett (1939–2008), founder and winemaker for The Eyrie Vineyards in Oregon
- Evelyn Lett (1896–1999), Canadian women's rights pioneer
- Henry William Lett (1836–1920), Irish botanist
- Joshua Lett (born 2004), Grenadian footballer
- Leon Lett (born 1968), former American Football defensive tackle
- Mark Stephen Lett, member of the Governing Body of Jehovah's Witnesses
- Michael Lett (born 1987), Rugby League player who plays for the Sydney Roosters in the National Rugby League (NRL) competition
- Stephen Lett (1847–1905), Irish-Canadian physician and writer
- Sherwood Lett (1895–1964), Canadian soldier, lawyer, diplomat, and jurist
- Steven Lett (born 1958), American diplomat and chief executive of the International Cospas-Sarsat Programme in Montreal, Canada
- William Pittman Lett (1819–1892), Irish-Canadian journalist

== See also ==
- Letts (disambiguation)
