= Irish Fusiliers =

Irish Fusiliers may refer to:

- Royal Irish Fusiliers, a British Army unit 1881–1968
- Irish Fusiliers of Canada, a Canadian Militia unit 1913–1936
- Irish Fusiliers of Canada (The Vancouver Regiment), a Canadian Militia, later Canadian Army unit 1936–1965
