= Irish Fusiliers of Canada =

The Irish Fusiliers of Canada
- Active: 1913–1936
- Country: Canada
- Branch: Canadian Militia
- Type: Fusiliers
- Role: Infantry
- Part of: Non-Permanent Active Militia
- Garrison/HQ: Vancouver, British Columbia
- Engagements: First World War
- Battle honours: See #Battle Honours

The Irish Fusiliers of Canada was an infantry regiment of the Non-Permanent Active Militia of the Canadian Militia (now the Canadian Army). In 1936, the regiment was amalgamated with The Vancouver Regiment to form The Irish Fusiliers of Canada (The Vancouver Regiment), which today forms part of The British Columbia Regiment (Duke of Connaught's Own).

== Lineage ==
=== The Irish Fusiliers of Canada ===
- Originated on 15 August 1913, in Vancouver, British Columbia, as the 11th Regiment Irish Fusiliers of Canada.
- Redesignated on 12 March 1920, as The Irish Fusiliers of Canada.
- Amalgamated on 1 June 1936, with The Vancouver Regiment and redesignated as the Irish Fusiliers (Vancouver Regiment).

== Perpetuations ==
- 121st Battalion (Western Irish), CEF

== History ==
=== Early history ===
On 15 August 1913, the 11th Regiment Irish Fusiliers of Canada was authorized for service. The regiment had its headquarters and companies in Vancouver.

=== Great War ===
On 6 August 1914, the 11th Regiment Irish Fusiliers of Canada was placed on active service for local protection duties.

On 22 December 1915, the 121st Battalion (Western Irish), CEF, was authorized for service, and on 14 November 1916 the battalion embarked for Great Britain. After its arrival in the UK, the battalion provided reinforcements for the Canadian Corps in the field. On 10 January 1917, the battalion’s personnel were absorbed by the 16th Reserve Battalion, CEF. Finally on 17 July 1917, the 121st Battalion, CEF, was disbanded.

=== 1920s–1930s ===
On 15 March 1920, as a result of the Otter Commission and the following post-war reorganization of the Canadian Militia, the 11th Regiment Irish Fusiliers of Canada was redesignated as The Irish Fusiliers of Canada and was reorganized with 2 battalions (1 of them a paper-only reserve battalion) to perpetuate the assigned war-raised battalions of the Canadian Expeditionary Force.

As a result of the 1936 Canadian Militia reorganization, on 1 June 1936, The Irish Fusiliers of Canada were amalgamated with The Vancouver Regiment to form the Irish Fusiliers (Vancouver Regiment) – later redesignated as The Irish Fusiliers of Canada (The Vancouver Regiment).

== Organization ==
=== 11th Regiment, Irish Fusiliers of Canada (15 August 1913) ===
- Regimental Headquarters (Vancouver, British Columbia)
- No. 1 Company
- No. 2 Company
- No. 3 Company
- No. 4 Company
- No. 5 Company
- No. 6 Company
- No. 7 Company
- No. 8 Company

=== The Irish Fusiliers of Canada (02 July, 1920) ===
- 1st Battalion (perpetuating the 121st Battalion, CEF)
- 2nd (Reserve) Battalion

== Battle Honours ==
- Ypres, 1915, '17
- Festubert, 1915
- Somme, 1916
- Arras, 1917, '18
- Hill 70
- Amiens
- Hindenburg Line
- Valenciennes

== Notable members ==
- Sherwood Lett
