= Graham Thomson Lyall =

Decorated British soldier, 1892–1941

Graham Thomson Lyall VC
- Born: 8 March 1892; Chorlton, Manchester, England
- Died: 28 November 1941 (aged 49); Mersa Matruh, Egypt
- Burial place: Halfaya Sollum War Cemetery
- Military career
- Allegiance: Canada; United Kingdom
- Branch: Canadian Expeditionary Force; British Army
- Service years: 1914–1919 (Canada); 1919–1941 (UK)
- Rank: Colonel
- Units: 102nd Battalion, CEF; Royal Army Ordnance Corps
- Conflicts: First World War: Battle of the Somme; Battle of Vimy Ridge; Battle of the Canal du Nord; Second World War
- Awards: Victoria Cross

Graham Thomson Lyall VC (8 March 1892 – 28 November 1941) was an English-born soldier in the Canadian Expeditionary Force during the First World War and recipient of the Victoria Cross, the highest and most prestigious award for gallantry in the face of the enemy that can be awarded to British and Commonwealth forces. He received the award for his actions on the Western Front in the final months of the war, while serving as an infantry officer. After the war, Lyall remained in the United Kingdom and returned to civilian life. Throughout the inter-war years, he served in the Territorial Army, in the Royal Army Ordnance Corps, and during the Second World War, he served in the British Army. He died of a heart attack at the age of 49, while on active service in Egypt.

== Early life ==
Lyall was born on 8 March 1892 in the village of Chorlton, near Manchester. His father, R. H. Lyall, was a reverend and in 1894, moved his family to Farnworth when he became vicar at St. John's Church. The family moved again in 1900, to Nelson in Lancashire, where Lyall attended Nelson Municipal Secondary School. He then went on to study mechanical engineering at a naval college.

In 1912, after completing his college studies, Lyall emigrated to Canada and settled in Welland, Ontario. He went to Toronto University to further his education and then became a mechanical engineer. A member of the British Institute of Engineers, he worked firstly for a steel foundry and then the Canadian Niagara Power Company, based at Niagara Falls.

== First World War ==
Lyall joined the Canadian Militia in October 1914, and was posted to the 19th Lincoln Regiment. He served as a guard on the canal at Niagara for several months before enlisting in the Canadian Expeditionary Force. After being shipped to England, he was posted to the 81st Battalion in October 1915 and was quickly made an acting corporal. Arriving on the Western Front in France in 1916, he participated in the Battle of the Somme and then the Battle of Vimy Ridge.

Having received further promotions, Lyall was selected for officer training and sent to the Canadian Officer's Training School in Sussex. After being commissioned in April 1917, Lyall was posted to the 102nd Battalion. As part of the Canadian 4th Division, Lyall's battalion was involved in the Battle of the Canal du Nord on 27 September 1918. Advancing against German forces in Boulon Wood, his platoon was held up by a series of strong points but due to his leadership, these were all overcome. For his actions, he was awarded the Victoria Cross (VC). The VC, instituted in 1856, was the highest award for valour that could be bestowed on a soldier of the British Empire. The citation for his VC read:

On September 27th, 1918, when the leading company was halted near Boulon Wood by an enemy strong point Lt. G. T. Lyall executed a flank movement with his platoon and captured it together with prisoners and its guns. Later that day his much weakened platoon was held up by machine guns at the southern end of the wood. Lt. Lyall led forward his few remaining men, then rushed the position single-handed, killing the officer in charge, and took it with its machine guns, capturing numerous prisoners. Advancing, he secured his final objective and still more prisoners. On October 1st, near Blecourt, by skilful disposition of the weak company he then commanded, he overcame another strongly held position, seizing numerous guns and many prisoners. In these two days Lt. Lyall captured 3 officers, 182 other ranks, 26 machine guns and 1 field gun, and inflicted heavy losses on the enemy. He showed throughout most conspicuous bravery, high powers of command, and skilful leadership.

— London Gazette, 13 December 1918

Lyall was presented with the VC by King George V in March 1919.

== Later life ==
Rather than return to Canada after being discharged from the CEF, Lyall remained in the United Kingdom. In April 1919, he married Elizabeth Moffat née Frew and the couple settled in Airdrie in Scotland. He became a manager at a brickworks before taking up a directorship of a construction firm in Airdrie. He retained an interest in the military and served in the Territorial Army. By 1939 he was a major with the Royal Army Ordnance Corps (RAOC) and commanding the workshop company of 3 Anti-Aircraft Division.

After the outbreak of the Second World War, Lyall was mobilised and his company based at Stirling, with the division responsible for the defence of central Scotland. Promoted to lieutenant colonel in May 1940, he volunteered to serve overseas. He was posted to the Middle East where he posted to the RAOC's No. 2 Base Ordnance Workshop at Tel El Kebir in Egypt. The following year he was promoted to colonel and took command of the 87th Lines of Communication. His area of responsibility was west of Mersa Matruh, supporting the frontline troops. He died of a heart attack on 28 November 1941 and is buried at the Halfaya Sollum War Cemetery in Egypt.

== Medal and legacy ==
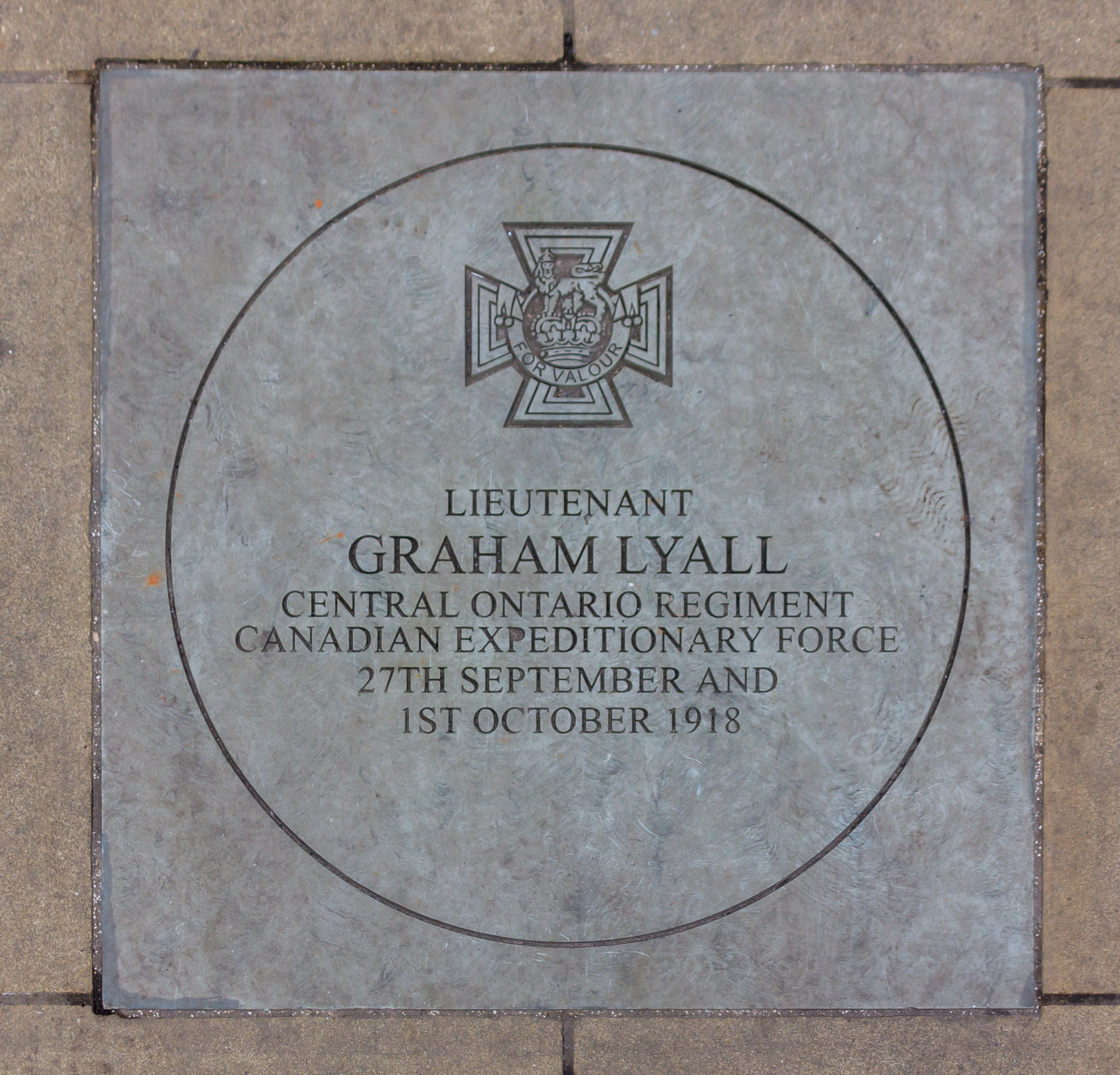
The memorial plaque at Manchester Cenotaph

In 2003, Lyall's Victoria Cross, together with his campaign medals from the First and Second World Wars was loaned to the REME Museum of Technology in Arborfield, Berkshire, on the wishes of his widow. The VC was subsequently returned to the family and a replica is displayed at the museum. A plaque in his memory is located in the city of St. Catharines in Niagara. There is also a memorial plaque to Lyall in Manchester, the city of his birth.
