= Larwill =

Larwill may refer to:

- Larwill, Indiana, a town in Whitley County, Indiana, United States
- David Larwill (1956–2011), Australian artist
- Edwin Larwill (ca 1806–1876), politician in the Province of Canada

== See also ==
- Larwill Park, a former park and sporting field in what is now Vancouver, British Columbia, Canada
- Lerwill (disambiguation)
