= Halfaya Sollum War Cemetery =

War cemetery in Egypt

- Commonwealth War Graves Commission
- Used for those deceased 1940–1944
- Location: 31.54956°N 25.16047°E near Sollum, Egypt
- Total burials: 2046
- Unknowns: 238

Burials by nation
- Allied Powers: United Kingdom: 937; South Africa: 367; New Zealand: 178; Australia: 169; India: 141; Canada: 11; Greece: 2

Burials by war
- Second World War: 2,046

Halfaya Sollum War Cemetery is a burial ground for military personnel who died in Egypt and Libya during the Second World War. It is located in Egypt, near the border with Libya. It is administered by the Commonwealth War Graves Commission. There are 2,046 military personnel of the Second World War interred in the cemetery, including 238 that remain unidentified.

== History ==
There was extensive fighting between Allied and Axis forces in Egypt and Libya during the Western Desert campaign from 1940 to 1942. Halfaya Pass, about 12 kilometres (7.5 mi) from Sollum was the scene of major engagements in 1941 and 1942. After the war, several interments from the battlefield and nearby locations, including Fort Capuzzo, Bardia, Minquar el Zannan, and Camerons Burial Ground were consolidated to Halfaya Sollum War Cemetery.

== Cemetery ==
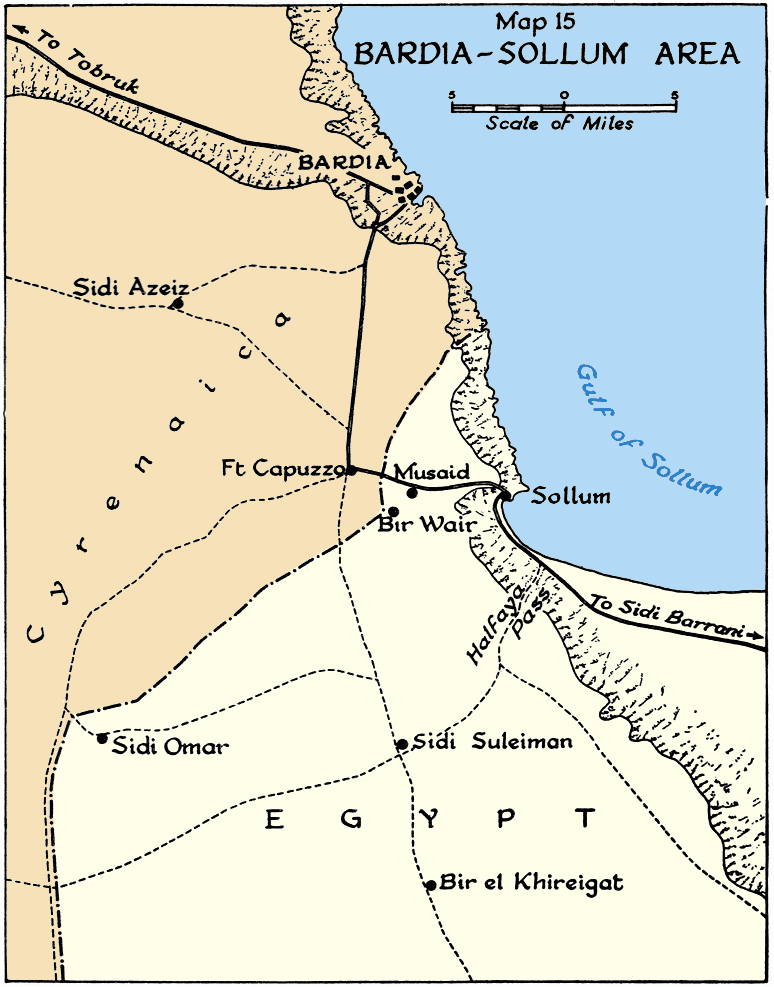
Map of the area around Sollum

The Halfaya Sollum War Cemetery is located in Sollum, Egypt, on the coastal road running between Mersa Matruh and the Libyan border. Laid out in a rectangular form, the cemetery's main entrance is along the east wall. A Cross of Sacrifice is centrally located and aligned with a Stone of Remembrance positioned against the west wall. Shelters are provided on the opposing north and south walls, with two more shelters on the west wall, on either side of the Stone of Remembrance.

The cemetery contains the remains of 2,046 military personnel, all from the Second World War. Most are from 1940 to 1942, while there are a few soldiers that died in 1943 and 1944. The majority of the identified interments are British, with 367 South Africans, 178 New Zealanders, 169 Australians, 141 Indians, eleven Canadians and two Greek military personnel also buried there. Notable burials in the cemetery include Colonel Graham Lyall, a First World War recipient of the Victoria Cross who was serving with the Royal Army Ordnance Corps when he died of a heart attack in November 1941, and Squadron Leader Derek Ward, a New Zealand flying ace who served with the Royal Air Force. He was killed in June 1942.
