= Sallum =

Sallum السلوم as-Sallūm
- Village/harbour-side town
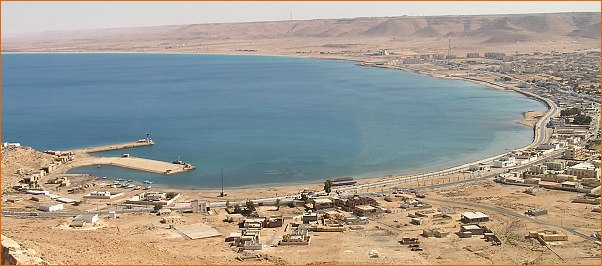
- The east-facing centre and (to background) south of the town which is where the coast assumes its overall north direction as throughout the rest of Egypt, though having many headlands much further east. The desert hills are the Akabah el-Kebir.

- Location in Egypt
- Coordinates: 31°33′00″N 25°09′36″E
- Country: Egypt
- Governorate: Matruh
- Elevation (by harbour, downtown) to 200 metres (in associated scarp): 3.3 ft (1 m)

Population (2006)
  - Total: 14,393
- Time zone: UTC+2 (EET)
  - Summer (DST): UTC+3 (EEST)

Sallum (Arabic: السلوم, romanized: as-Sallūm Egyptian Arabic pronunciation: [essælˈluːm] various transliterations include El Salloum, As Sallum or Sollum) is a harbourside village or town in Egypt. It is along the Egypt/Libyan short north–south aligned coast of the Mediterranean Sea in the far northwest corner of Egypt. It is, geodesically, eight kilometres (five miles) east of the border with Libya, and 128 kilometres (80 mi) from the notable port of Tobruk, Libya.

Sallum is mainly a Bedouin community of the families of merchants, fishermen and herdsmen. It has little tourist activity and few organized historical curiosities. It is a key trading center for the local Bedouin community. It has a World War II Commonwealth War Graves Commission cemetery and is 7.5 kilometres (4 3/4 mi) north of Halfaya Pass.

Sallum is on its own pass which, improved since World War II, has become the main pass ascending the related ridge, which obstructs east–west trade. The ridge extends away from its northern part, east-facing sea cliffs, south by 55 km (34 mi), there turning increasingly east. This escarpment is the ʿAqaba al-Kabīr, once called the ʿAqaba as-Sallūm, such as in the 12th century – a descriptor meaning graded (evened out) ascent, thus giving the town its name. There are no other roadworthy passes nearby.

Sallum was a small Roman port. Some Roman wells remain locally. Sometimes called Baranis, the port should not be confused with the medieval-noted branch of the Berbers, the al-Baranis.

At its southern end, scattered homes mark out the end of the northern coast of Egypt. Amenities include a post office and a National Bank of Egypt branch.

== History ==
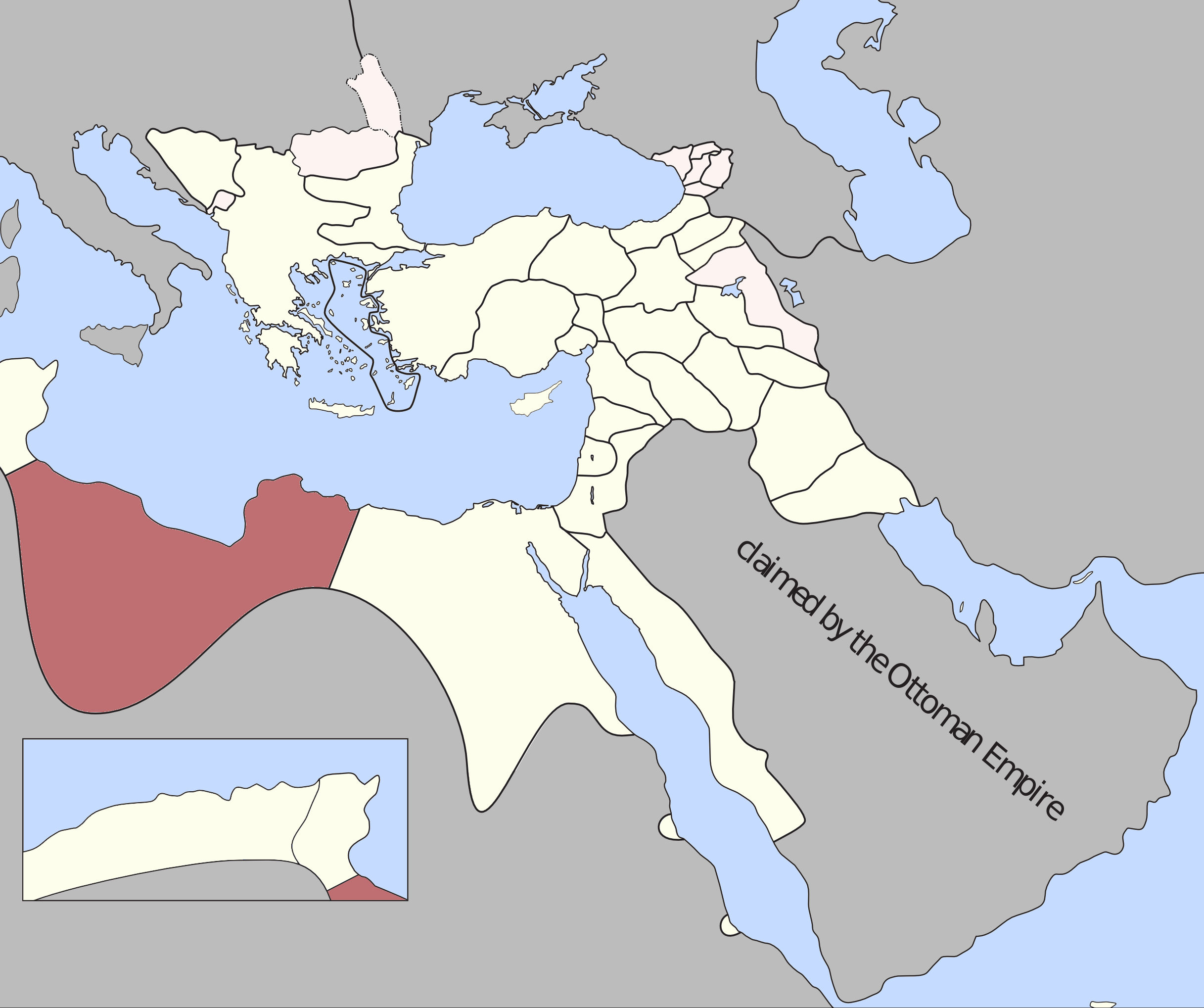
Wider context, broad reach of the Ottoman Empire such as in 1795, highlighting the Eyalet of Tripolitania

=== Early settlement ===
Local people are mentioned in some Roman accounts of Catabathmus Maior/Magnus (referring to the local, obstructive ridge to east–west land trade, ʿAqaba as-Sallūm or more commonly today ʿAqaba al-Kabīr, literally 'the great pass.' It may have been Plynos Limen and Tetrapyrgia mentioned in less context-clear early courses.

Sallum was the origin for many eastward migrations to Egypt Eyalet and Bilad al-Sham. During the 19th century, one family migrated first to Tafilah in southern Jordan, and thence to the region of Jaffa. They settled in ancient village of Mulabbis, and lived there for several generations until the establishment of Petah Tikva, the first Zionist colony, in 1878.

=== Sovereignty and battles ===
Sallum was part of the Eyalet then Vilayet of Tripolitania, 1551–1911, the year before its fall mainly to Italy. That year, during the Italo-Turkish War, an Anglo-Egyptian force took it over, relieving its garrison, to prevent it from falling into Italian hands. When the border between Italian Libya and Egypt was settled by treaty in 1925, Sallum was placed on the Egyptian side.

During the Senussi Campaign of World War I, Sallum was captured by the Senussi in November 1915 with Ottoman and German assistance. It was re-taken by the British in March 1916.

In December 1941, during Operation Crusader in World War II (and the two other operations affecting nearby Halfaya Pass), Sallum was the location of fighting between the British Empire with allied Commonwealth forces against German with Italian forces; the latter were retreating from gains they had made deeper into Egypt. The Halfaya Sollum War Cemetery was established by the Commonwealth War Graves Commission to inter over 2,000 soldiers who died in the region.

On July 21, 1977, Libya attacked Sallum, initiating the first clash in the Libyan-Egyptian War.

=== Solar eclipse ===
Sallum was a destination in the total solar eclipse on March 29, 2006 among expeditions.

== Climate ==
Köppen-Geiger climate classification system classifies its climate, like almost all of Egypt, as hot desert (BWh). However, typically for the northern coast, Sallum has its temperatures moderated by blowing winds from the Mediterranean Sea.

Climate data for Sallum
Month	Jan	Feb	Mar	Apr	May	Jun	Jul	Aug	Sep	Oct	Nov	Dec	Year
Record high °C (°F)	30.3 (86.5)	33.4 (92.1)	37.4 (99.3)	42.4 (108.3)	44.2 (111.6)	47.3 (117.1)	41.7 (107.1)	47.2 (117.0)	43.0 (109.4)	41.4 (106.5)	36.6 (97.9)	32.0 (89.6)	47.3 (117.1)
Mean daily maximum °C (°F)	18.6 (65.5)	19.6 (67.3)	21.4 (70.5)	24.2 (75.6)	26.8 (80.2)	30.0 (86.0)	31.3 (88.3)	31.1 (88.0)	29.6 (85.3)	27.4 (81.3)	23.9 (75.0)	20.2 (68.4)	25.3 (77.5)
Daily mean °C (°F)	13.8 (56.8)	14.5 (58.1)	16.1 (61.0)	18.6 (65.5)	21.2 (70.2)	24.7 (76.5)	26.2 (79.2)	26.4 (79.5)	25.0 (77.0)	22.6 (72.7)	18.9 (66.0)	15.3 (59.5)	20.3 (68.5)
Mean daily minimum °C (°F)	9.8 (49.6)	10.3 (50.5)	11.8 (53.2)	14.1 (57.4)	16.9 (62.4)	20.3 (68.5)	21.9 (71.4)	22.3 (72.1)	20.9 (69.6)	18.5 (65.3)	14.8 (58.6)	11.3 (52.3)	16.1 (61.0)
Record low °C (°F)	3.7 (38.7)	4.8 (40.6)	6.1 (43.0)	8.5 (47.3)	9.9 (49.8)	14.0 (57.2)	18.0 (64.4)	18.4 (65.1)	15.4 (59.7)	12.9 (55.2)	7.3 (45.1)	6.5 (43.7)	3.7 (38.7)
Average rainfall mm (inches)	21 (0.8)	15 (0.6)	7 (0.3)	6 (0.2)	2 (0.1)	1 (0.0)	0 (0)	0 (0)	0 (0)	13 (0.5)	10 (0.4)	17 (0.7)	92 (3.6)
Average rainy days (≥ 1.0 mm)	2.7	1.1	0.7	0.8	0.2	0.1	0.0	0.0	0.1	1.1	1.0	1.3	9.1
Average relative humidity (%)	59	58	59	58	60	59	62	65	64	62	59	59	60.3
Mean monthly sunshine hours	217.0	211.9	279.0	297.0	306.9	369.0	393.7	378.2	327.0	300.7	219.0	210.8	3,510.2
Mean daily sunshine hours	7.0	7.5	9.0	9.9	9.9	12.3	12.7	12.2	10.9	9.7	7.3	6.8	9.6
Source 1: NOAA
Source 2: Arab Meteorology Book (sun only)

== In Egyptian pop culture ==
One of the most popular kinds of muʽassel for shisha is named sallum after the town. The reasoning is most likely because it's a coastal and border town where the tobacco used to make the muʽassel is imported before being distributed to the rest of Egypt

== See also ==
- Halfaya Pass
- Military history of Italy during World War II
- Egypt in World War II
- Egyptian–Libyan War
