= Lerwill =

Lerwill is a surname. Notable people with the surname include:

- Alan Lerwill (born 1946), British former long jumper
- Sheila Lerwill (born 1928), British female high jumper

== See also ==
- Gregory Gray (born Paul Lerwill, 1959, Northern Ireland), singer/songwriter
- Larwill (disambiguation)
