= 121st Battalion (Western Irish), CEF =

121st "Overseas" Battalion, CEF
- Active: 1915–1917
- Disbanded: 1917
- Country: Canada
- Branch: Canadian Expeditionary Force
- Type: Infantry
- Mobilization headquarters: New Westminster
- Nickname: Western Irish
- Battle honours: The Great War, 1916–17

Commanders
- Officer commanding: LCol Archibald Woodbury McLelan

The 121st (Western Irish) Battalion, CEF was a unit in the Canadian Expeditionary Force during the First World War. Based in New Westminster, British Columbia, the unit was authorized on 22 December 1915 and began recruiting in that city. After sailing to England on RMS Empress of Britain in August 1916, the battalion was absorbed into the 16th Reserve Battalion on January 10, 1917. The 121st (Western Irish) Battalion, CEF had one Officer Commanding: Lieutenant-Colonel Archibald Woodbury McLelan.

The 121st Battalion is perpetuated by The British Columbia Regiment (Duke of Connaught's Own). The perpetuation has been passed down through the following units as a result of reorganizations and amalgamations:

- 1920–1936: 1st Battalion (121st Battalion, CEF), The Irish Fusiliers of Canada
- 1936–1946: Irish Fusiliers (Vancouver Regiment)
- 1946–1958: 65th Light Anti-Aircraft Regiment (Irish Fusiliers), RCA
- 1958–2002: The Irish Fusiliers of Canada (The Vancouver Regiment)
- 2002–present: The British Columbia Regiment (Duke of Connaught's Own)
