= Beatty Street Drill Hall =

Coordinates: 49.279367°N 123.110657°W

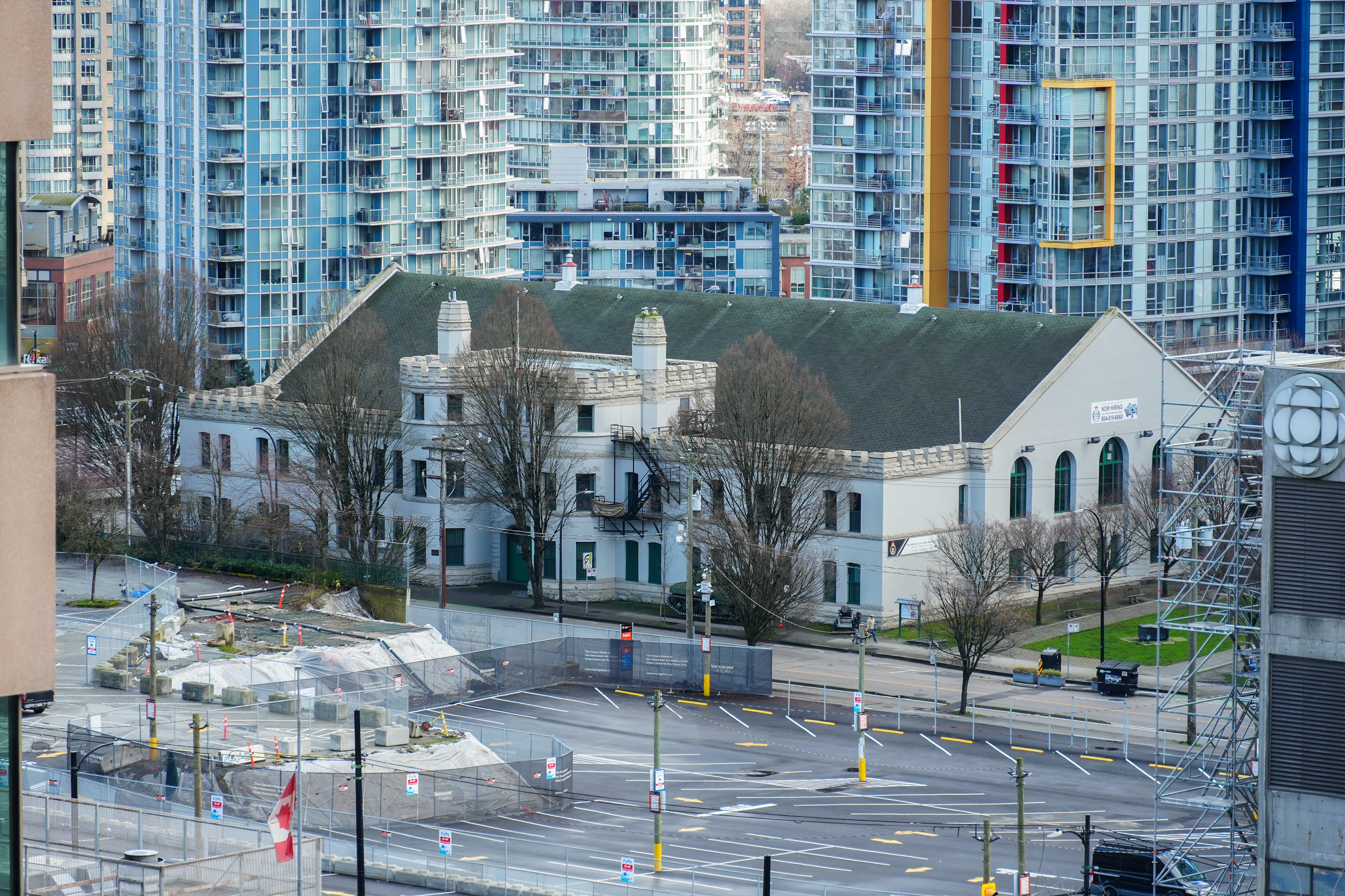
- Beatty Street Drill Hall in 2026
- Interactive map of the Beatty Street Drill Hall area

General information
- Type: Drill Hall / armoury
- Location: 620 Beatty Street; Vancouver, British Columbia; V6B 2L9
- Current tenants: The British Columbia Regiment (Duke of Connaught's Own)
- Inaugurated: 30 September 1901
- Owner: Canadian Armed Forces

Design and construction
- Architect: T.W. Fuller
- Designations: Recognized Federal Heritage Building

The Beatty Street Drill Hall is a Canadian Forces armoury located at 620 Beatty Street in Vancouver, British Columbia. It is the home of The British Columbia Regiment (Duke of Connaught's Own), an armoured reconnaissance reserve regiment, the oldest military unit in Vancouver, and the most senior militia in the province.

== Architecture ==
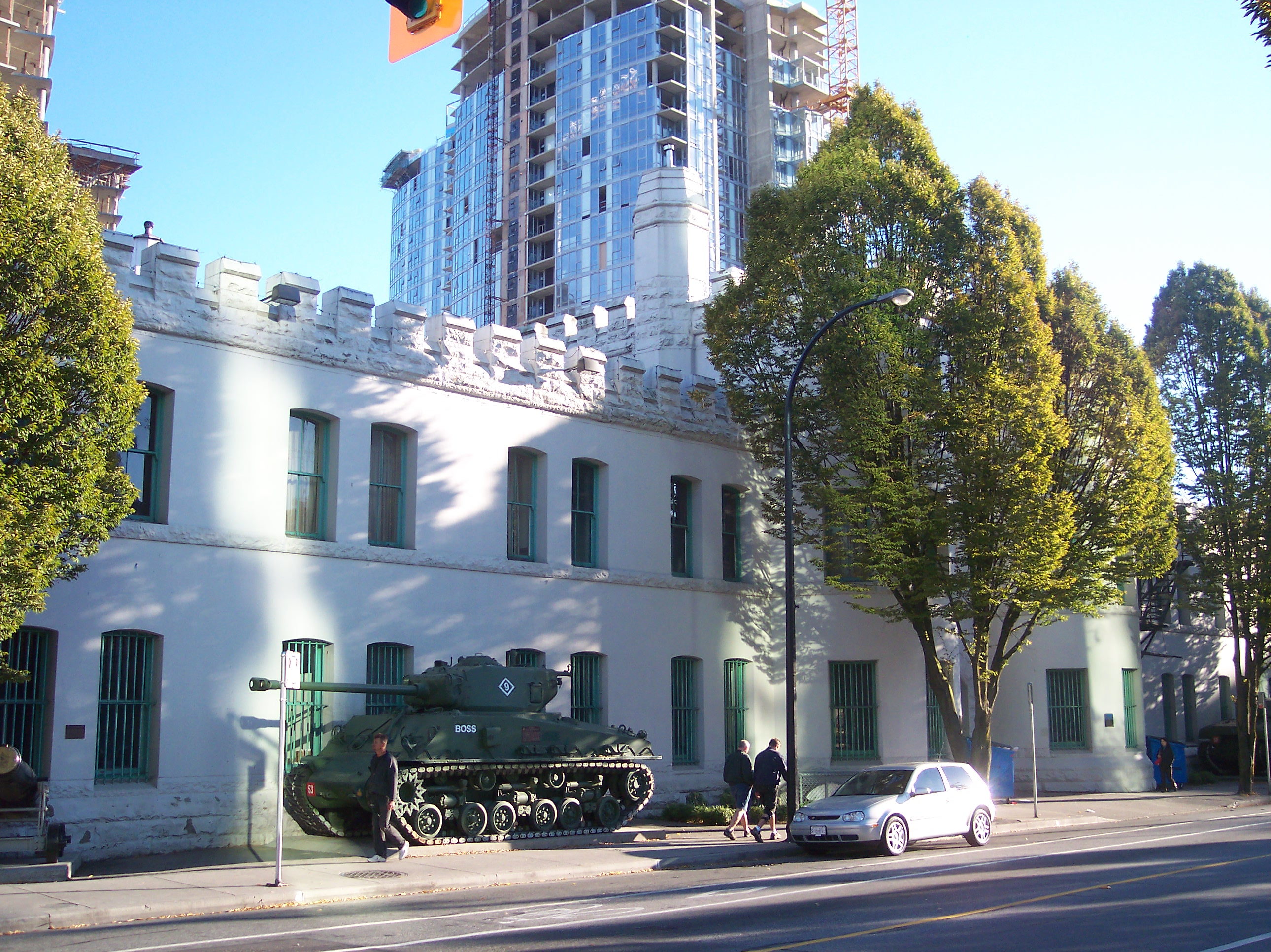
Battlements are visible on the roof of the drill hall.

The building was designed by architect T.W. Fuller and opened on 30 September 1901 by the Duke of Cornwall (later King George V). With two large castle-like turrets complete with battlements, and two tanks and a 64-pounder gun alongside the large white structure, Beatty Street Drill Hall has long been a Vancouver landmark and is listed as a class-A heritage building. The walls are three and a half feet thick, and the building rests on huge granite blocks. Limestone from Gabriola Island was used for the parapet and it features a rusticated stone trim.

The Drill Hall includes a parade square, offices, and store rooms. It formerly contained a firing range and bowling alley. Originally, the Cambie Street Grounds, now a parking lot across the street, was also used as part of the regiment's training facilities.

== Memorials ==
A stone cairn was dedicated to the local war dead of the First and Second World Wars and the local veterans of the Korean War and peacekeeping. Presented by the grateful Dutch Canadians of Vancouver in 1970, a copper plaque is dedicated to the memory of the B.C. Regiment who helped liberate Holland in the 1944 - 1945 campaign. A wooden Celtic cross was dedicated to the officers, NCO's and men who fell at Vimy Ridge. A plaque was erected by their fellow officers and men in honour of the men of the 28th Canadian Armoured Regiment who died while serving in the Second World War. A plaque is dedicated to members of the 6th Regiment Duke of Connaught's Own Rifles who lost their lives in South African War of 1899 - 1902. A plaque was dedicated to Lt. Colonel George McSpadden and the fallen heroes of the 11th Regiment Irish Fusiliers of Canada. A plaque was dedicated 17 October 1994 to commemorate the affiliation of HMCS Vancouver (FFH 331) and the B.C. Regiment.

== Regimental Museum of the BC Regiment ==
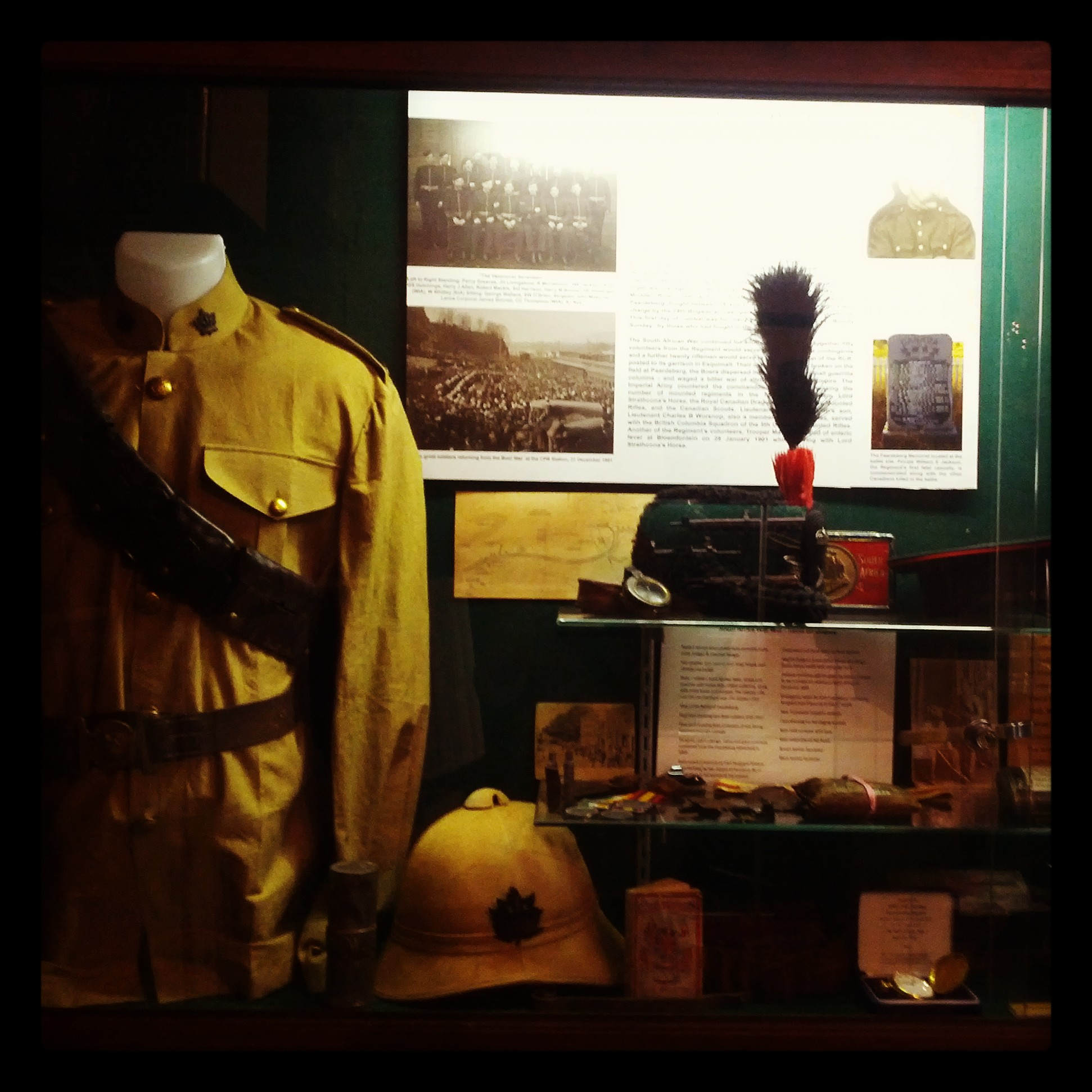
Items on display at the BC Regiment museum.

The Regimental Museum of the BC Regiment (DCO) is housed in the Beatty Street Drill Hall, Metro Vancouver. Military displays date back to 1883, including uniforms, weapons, medals, Nazi regalia, and a large collection of photographs documenting the history and artifacts of The British Columbia Regiment (Duke of Connaught's Own) and the Beatty Street Drill Hall. The museum was established in 1982 and is open to the public Wednesdays. In addition to the BC Regiment (DCO), the 2290 British Columbia Regiment (Duke of Connaught's Own) Cadet Corps also parades at the armoury.

== See also ==
- List of armouries in Canada
- List of heritage buildings in Vancouver
