= Irish Fusiliers of Canada (The Vancouver Regiment) =

Canadian infantry regiment

The Irish Fusiliers of Canada (The Vancouver Regiment)
- Regimental badge
- Active: 1913–1965
- Country: Canada
- Branch: Canadian Militia (1913–1940); Canadian Army (1940–1965)
- Type: Fusiliers
- Role: Infantry
- Size: One battalion
- Part of: Non-Permanent Active Militia (1913–1940); Royal Canadian Infantry Corps (1942–1946, 1958–1965); Royal Canadian Artillery (1946–1958)
- Regimental Headquarters: Vancouver
- Motto: Faugh A Ballagh (Irish for 'Clear the Way')
- Engagements: First World War; Second World War
- Battle honours: See #Battle honours

The Irish Fusiliers of Canada (The Vancouver Regiment) was an infantry regiment of the Canadian Army. It was placed on the Supplementary Order of Battle in 1965. In 2002, it was taken off the Supplementary Order of Battle and amalgamated with The British Columbia Regiment (Duke of Connaught's Own).

== Lineage ==
=== The Irish Fusiliers of Canada (The Vancouver Regiment) ===
The Irish Fusiliers of Canada (The Vancouver Regiment) was formed in Vancouver, British Columbia on 15 August 1913 as the 11th Regiment Irish Fusiliers of Canada. The regiment was redesignated The Irish Fusiliers of Canada on 12 March 1920 and reorganized as a two-battalion regiment with the 1st Battalion perpetuating the 121st Battalion (Western Irish), CEF and a 2nd Battalion on the Reserve order of battle. The reserve unit was disbanded on 14 December 1936.

On 1 June 1936 the Irish Fusiliers of Canada were amalgamated with The Vancouver Regiment and were redesignated the Irish Fusiliers (Vancouver Regiment). It was redesignated as the 2nd (Reserve) Battalion, Irish Fusiliers (Vancouver Regiment) on 1 January 1941 and the Irish Fusiliers (Vancouver Regiment) on 1 June 1945. The regiment was converted to artillery and redesignated the 65th Light Anti-Aircraft Regiment (Irish Fusiliers), Royal Canadian Artillery on 1 April 1946. On 1 September 1958 the regiment amalgamated with the 120th Independent Field Battery, RCA, converted to infantry and redesignated The Irish Fusiliers of Canada (The Vancouver Regiment).

=== 120th Independent Field Battery, RCA / The North British Columbia Regiment ===
The 120th Independent Field Battery, RCA originated in Prince Rupert, British Columbia on 1 May 1914 as the Earl Grey's Own Rifles. It was redesignated as the 68th Regiment (Earl Grey's Own Rifles) on 2 November 1914 and as The North British Columbia Regiment on 12 March 1920. Upon redesignation as The North British Columbia Regiment it was organized as a two battalion regiment with the 1st Battalion perpetuating the 102nd Battalion, CEF and the 2nd Battalion, perpetuating the 30th Battalion, CEF, on the Reserve order of battle. The reserve unit was disbanded on 14 December 1936.

On 15 December 1936 the North British Columbia Regiment was converted to artillery and redesignated as the 102nd (North British Columbia) Heavy Battery, RCA. During the Second World War it was redesignated as the 102nd (Reserve) (North British Columbia) Heavy Battery, RCA on 1 January 1941 and as the 120th Coast Battery, RCA on 1 April 1946. Following the Second World War, the unit was redesignated again as the 120th Heavy Anti Aircraft Battery, RCA on 5 February 1948, as the 120th Harbour Defence Troop, RCA on 17 October 1954 and the 120th Independent Field Battery, RCA on 25 October 1956. On 1 September 1958, it was amalgamated with the 65th Light Anti-Aircraft Regiment (Irish Fusiliers), RCA.

The North British Columbia Regiment was awarded the following battle honours in 1929. After conversion to artillery, these honours became dormant, being replaced by the RCA's honorary distinction Ubique.

- Ypres, 1915, '17 (Note: "Ypres, 1917" selected to be borne on colours)
- Festubert, 1915
- Mount Sorrel
- Somme, 1916 (Note: Selected to be borne on colours)
- Ancre Heights
- Ancre, 1916
- Arras, 1917, '18
- Vimy, 1917
- Hill 70
- Passchendaele
- Amiens
- Scarpe, 1918
- Drocourt–Quéant
- Hindenburg Line
- Canal du Nord
- Valenciennes
- France and Flanders, 1915–18

=== The Vancouver Regiment ===
The Vancouver Regiment originated in Vancouver, British Columbia on 15 May 1924 when the 1st British Columbia Regiment (Duke of Connaught's Own) was reorganized into three separate regiments designated the 1st British Columbia Regiment (Duke of Connaught's Own), The Westminster Regiment and The Vancouver Regiment. On 1 June 1936, it was amalgamated with The Irish Fusiliers of Canada.

== Perpetuations ==
The Irish Fusiliers of Canada (The Vancouver Regiment) perpetuated the following units:

- 29th Battalion (Vancouver), CEF
- 30th Battalion, CEF
- 102nd Battalion, CEF
- 121st Battalion (Western Irish), CEF
- 158th Battalion (The Duke of Connaught's Own), CEF

After amalgamation in 2002, these perpetuations are continued on by The British Columbia Regiment (Duke of Connaught's Own).

== History ==
=== First World War ===
On 6 August 1914, the 11th Regiment Irish Fusiliers of Canada was placed on active service for local protection duties.

On 7 November 1914, the 29th Battalion, CEF was authorized for service and on 20 May 1915, the battalion embarked for Great Britain. On 17 September 1915, the 29th Battalion disembarked in France where it fought as part of the 6th Canadian Infantry Brigade, 2nd Canadian Division in France and Flanders until the end of the war. On 30 August 1920, the 29th Battalion was disbanded after its return to Canada.

On 27 October 1914, the 30th Battalion, CEF was authorized and on 23 February 1915, the battalion embarked for Great Britain. After its arrival in the UK, on 18 April 1915, it was redesignated as the 30th Reserve Battalion, CEF to provide reinforcements for the Canadian Corps in the field. On 4 January 1917, its personnel were absorbed by the '1st Reserve Battalion, CEF and on 1 September 1917, the 30th Battalion was disbanded.

On 22 December 1915, the 102nd Battalion, CEF was authorized and on 18 June 1916, the battalion embarked for Great Britain. On 12 August 1916, the 102nd Battalion disembarked in France where it fought as part of the 11th Canadian Infantry Brigade, 4th Canadian Division in France and Flanders until the end of the war. On 30 August 1920, the 102nd Battalion was disbanded after its return to Canada.

On 22 December 1915, the 121st Battalion, CEF was authorized and on 14 November 1916, the battalion embarked for Great Britain. After its arrival in the UK, the battalion provided reinforcements for the Canadian Corps in the field. On 10 January 1917, its personnel were absorbed by the 16th Reserve Battalion, CEF and on 17 July 1917, the 121st Battalion was disbanded.

On 22 December 1915, the 158th Battalion, CEF was authorized and on 14 November 1916, the battalion embarked for Great Britain. After its arrival in the UK, the battalion provided reinforcements for the Canadian Corps in the field. On 4 January 1917, its personnel were absorbed by the 1st Reserve Battalion, CEF and on 27 July 1917, the 158th Battalion was disbanded.

=== Second World War ===
==== Irish Fusiliers (Vancouver Regiment) ====
On 26 August 1939, detachments from the Irish Fusiliers were called out on service and on 1 September 1939, placed on active service under the designation 'Irish Fusiliers (Vancouver Regiment), CASF for local protection duties. On 31 December 1940, those details called out on active service were disbanded.

On 1 January 1941, the regiment was subsequently mobilized for active service as the 1st Battalion, Irish Fusiliers (Vancouver Regiment), CASF. The battalion served in Canada in a home defence role as part of the 18th Canadian Infantry Brigade, 6th Canadian Infantry Division. From 18 May 1943 to 6 August 1944, the battalion served on garrison duty in Jamaica. On 10 January 1945, the battalion embarked for Great Britain. After its arrival in the UK, on 19 January 1945, the battalion was disbanded to provide reinforcements to the First Canadian Army in the field.

On 12 May 1942, the regiment also mobilized the 3rd Battalion, Irish Fusiliers (Vancouver Regiment), CASF. The battalion served in Canada in a home defence role as part of the 19th Canadian Infantry Brigade of Pacific Command. On 15 August 1943, the 3rd battalion, Irish Fusiliers (Vancouver Regiment) was disbanded.

==== 102nd Battery ====
On 26 August 1939, the 102nd Battery was called out for service and on 1 September 1939, details of the battery were placed on active service under the designation of the 102nd (North British Columbia) Heavy Battery, RCA, CASF for local protection duties. On 31 December 1940, those details called out on active service were disbanded.

On 1 January 1941, the battery subsequently mobilized as the 102nd (North British Columbia) Heavy Battery, RCA, CASF for active service. On 1 May 1942, it was redesignated the 102nd Coast Battery, RCA, CASF. The battery served in Canada in a home defence role with the 17th (North British Columbia) Coast Regiment, RCA, CASF as part of Pacific Command. On 31 October 1945, the battery was disbanded.

=== Post war ===
The Irish Fusiliers of Canada (The Vancouver Regiment) were reduced to nil strength and transferred to the Supplementary Order of Battle on 19 March 1965. On 13 June 2002, it was removed from the Supplementary Order of Battle and amalgamated with The British Columbia Regiment (Duke of Connaught's Own). The regiment is commemorated by 2381 BC Regiment (Irish Fusiliers) Royal Canadian Army Cadet Corps of Richmond, B.C.

== Alliances ==
- United Kingdom - The Buffs (Royal East Kent Regiment) (Until 1961)
- United Kingdom - The Royal Irish Fusiliers (Princess Victoria's) (Until 1965)

== Battle honours ==
=== Great War ===
- Ypres, 1915, '17
- Mount Sorrel
- Flers-Courcelette
- Ancre Heights
- Arras, 1917, '18
- Scarpe, 1917, '18
- Passchendaele
- Drocourt-Quéant
- Canal du Nord
- Valenciennes
- Festubert, 1915
- Somme, 1916, '18
- Thiepval
- Ancre, 1916
- Vimy, 1917
- Hill 70
- Amiens
- Hindenburg Line
- Cambrai, 1918
- France and Flanders, 1915–18

After amalgamation in 2002, these battle honours are continued on by The British Columbia Regiment (Duke of Connaught's Own).

== Notable members ==
- Sherwood Lett
- Michael George Levy

== Royal Canadian Army Cadets ==
The regiment is commemorated by 2381 British Columbia Regiment Irish Fusiliers Royal Canadian Army Cadet Corps in Richmond, B.C.

== Links ==
- http://canadiansoldiers.com/regiments/infantry/irishfusiliers.htm
