= 62nd Battalion (British Columbia), CEF =

Canadian infantry battalion

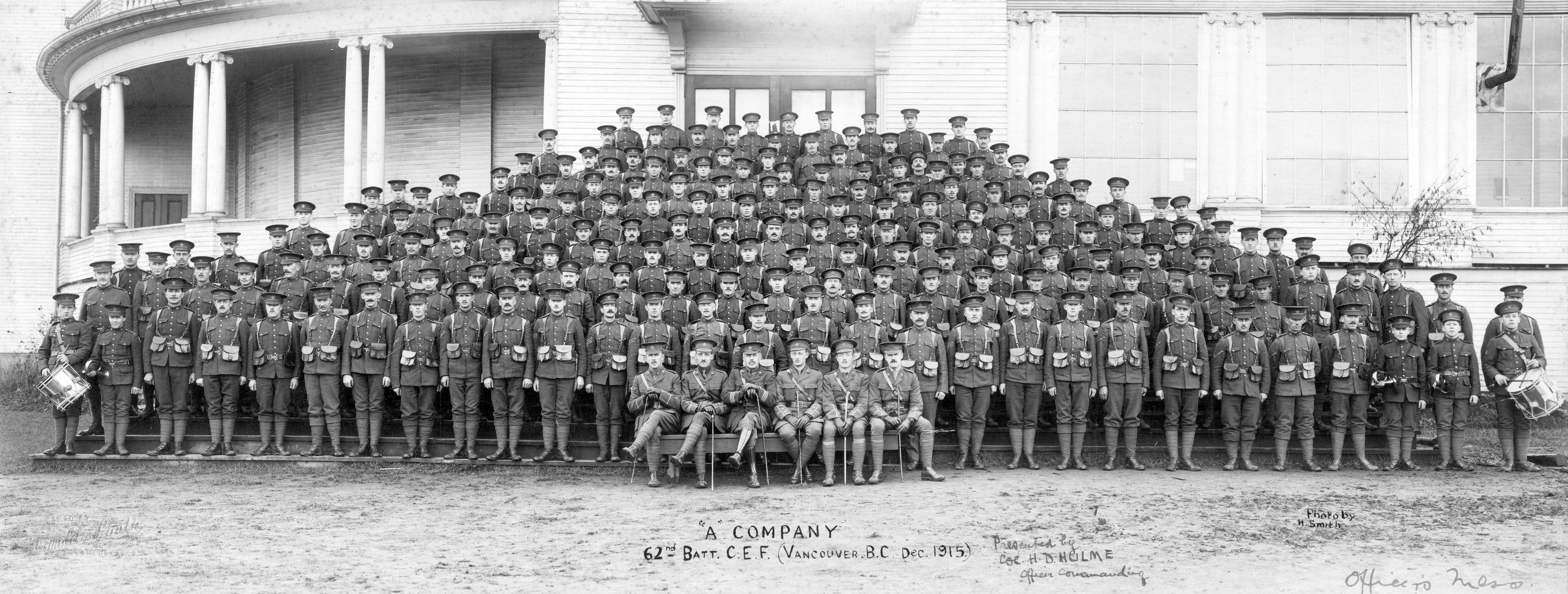
The "A" Company of the 62nd Battalion in Dec. 1915

The 62nd Battalion (British Columbia), CEF was an infantry battalion of the Canadian Expeditionary Force during the Great War. The 62nd Battalion was authorized on 20 April 1915 and embarked for Britain on 20 March 1916. It provided reinforcements for the Canadian Corps in the field until 6 July 1916 when its personnel were absorbed by the '30th Reserve Battalion, CEF'. The battalion was subsequently disbanded on 8 December 1917.

The 62nd Battalion recruited in Victoria, Prince Rupert and Vancouver, British Columbia and was mobilized at Vancouver.

The 62nd Battalion was commanded by Lt.-Col. H.D. Hulme from 1 April 1916 to 6 July 1916.

The 62nd Battalion was awarded the battle honour THE GREAT WAR 1916.

The 62nd Battalion, CEF is perpetuated by The British Columbia Regiment (Duke of Connaught's Own).

== Sources ==
Canadian Expeditionary Force 1914-1919 by Col. G. W. L. Nicholson, CD, Queen's Printer, Ottawa, Ontario, 1962
