= Robert Hill Hanna =

Robert Hill Hanna VC
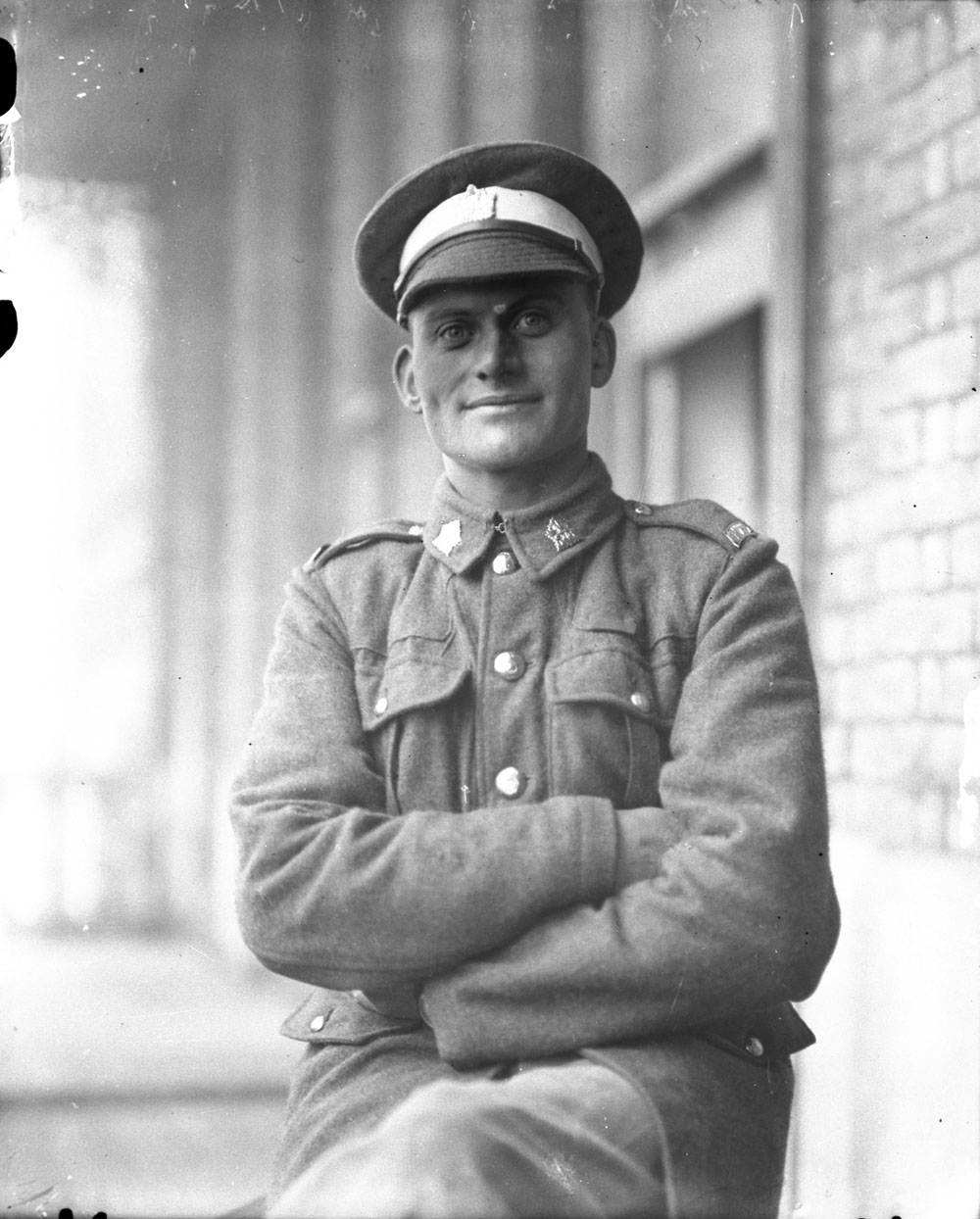
- Cadet R. Hanna, V.C.
- Born: 6 August 1886; Kilkeel, Ireland
- Died: 15 June 1967 (aged 80); Mount Lehman, British Columbia, Canada
- Burial place: Masonic Cemetery, Burnaby, British Columbia
- Military career
- Allegiance: Canada
- Branch: Canadian Expeditionary Force
- Rank: Lieutenant
- Units: 29th Battalion (British Columbia Regiment)
- Conflicts: First World War; Battle of Hill 70
- Awards: Victoria Cross

Robert Hill Hanna VC (6 August 1886 – 15 June 1967), was a Presbyterian Irish-born naturalised immigrant to Canada. He was a soldier in the Canadian Expeditionary Force and recipient of the Victoria Cross, the highest and most prestigious award for gallantry in the face of the enemy that can be awarded to British and Commonwealth forces.

Hanna joined the Canadian Expeditionary Force in November 1914. He was a Company Sergeant-Major in the 29th Battalion, CEF, Canadian Expeditionary Force during the First World War when the following deed took place during the Battle of Hill 70 for which he was awarded the Victoria Cross. The citation published in the London Gazette, of November 8, 1917, detailed the event as follows:-

On August 21, 1917, at Hill 70 Lens, France, Company Sergeant-Major Hanna's company met with enemy resistance at a heavily protected strong point, which had withstood three assaults resulting in all company officers becoming casualties. This warrant officer, under heavy machine-gun and rifle fire, collected and led a party against the strong point, rushed through the wire and personally killed four of the enemy, capturing the position and silencing the machine-gun. This courageous action was responsible for the capture of a most important tactical point.

Hanna was decorated for his courageous actions with the Victoria Cross by His Majesty King George V, at a ceremony held at Buckingham Palace on December 5, 1917. He later achieved the rank of lieutenant.

He was born near Hanna's Close in Kilkeel, County Down, in the province of Ulster in Ireland, near to the Mourne Mountains. His personal sword is on the wall of Kilkeel Royal British Legion club. In Kilkeel he belonged to Aughnahoory Loyal Orange Lodge No 343 and upon moving to Canada he joined the Orange Order in Canada Vancouver based Ontario L.O.L. No. 2226.

He died in Mount Lehman, British Columbia, Canada, on 15 June 1967. Hanna is buried at the Masonic Cemetery, Burnaby, British Columbia (plot 49, section C, grave 2).
