= Derek Harland Ward =

New Zealand-born British World War II flying ace

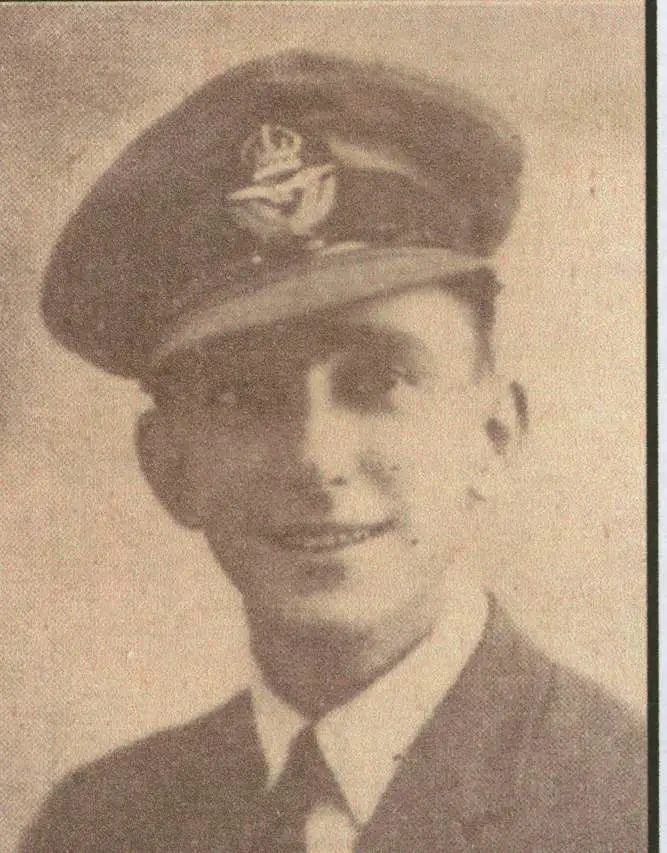
- Born: 31 July 1917; Whangārei, New Zealand
- Died: 17 June 1942 (aged 24); Egypt
- Military career
- Allegiance: New Zealand; United Kingdom
- Branch: Royal New Zealand Air Force (1937–1938); Royal Air Force (1938–1942)
- Service years: 1937–1942
- Rank: Squadron Leader
- Commands: No. 73 Squadron (1941–1942)
- Conflicts: Second World War; Battle of France; Battle of Britain; North African campaign
- Awards: Distinguished Flying Cross & Bar

Derek Harland Ward, DFC & Bar (31 July 1917 – 17 June 1942) was a New Zealand flying ace of the Royal Air Force (RAF) during the Second World War. He was credited with having shot down six German aircraft.

Born in Whangārei, Ward joined the Royal New Zealand Air Force in 1937. Gaining his pilot's wings by the end of the year, he then obtained a short service commission in the RAF. He flew Hawker Hurricane fighters with No. 151 Squadron during the early part of the Second World War. He then joined No. 87 Squadron while it was engaged in the Battle of France and the subsequent Battle of Britain. He was awarded the Distinguished Flying Cross (DFC) in October 1941. The following month he was appointed commander of No. 73 Squadron, based in Egypt. He led the squadron in numerous operational missions during the North African campaign, escorting bombers and carrying offensive sweeps on enemy airfields and installations. He was awarded a Bar to his DFC in May 1942. Ward was shot down and killed by the German flying ace Hans-Joachim Marseille on 17 June 1942.

== Early life ==
Derek Harland Ward was born on 31 July 1917 to Sidney Harland Ward and his wife, Margaret Emilie Ward, in Whangārei, New Zealand, where his father was a medical doctor. He was educated locally, attending Whangarei Primary School and then going onto Whangarei High School where he became a head prefect. In 1936, while in his final year of schooling, he applied to join the Royal New Zealand Air Force (RNZAF) but was declined. Early the following year, he began attending a flying school in Hamilton and in April obtained his pilot's licence. A second application to join the RNZAF, made two months after starting his pilot training, was successful. He began flight training on a Hawker Tomtit trainer aircraft at Wigram Air Base in June, before graduating onto the larger Avro 626 and Vickers Vildebeest aircraft. By the end of the year, he had gained his pilot's wings.

After spending the early part of 1938 doing advanced training, Ward was selected to go to the United Kingdom to join the Royal Air Force (RAF) on a short service commission. He left New Zealand with seven other personnel from the RNZAF aboard the Tamaroa in April. Shortly after arriving in the United Kingdom, he commenced his service with the RAF on 1 June as a pilot officer. He completed an induction course at Uxbridge and was then posted to No. 151 Squadron, which operated Gloster Gauntlet fighters from the RAF base at North Weald. At the squadron, he was rated as an exceptional pilot and was part of its aerobatics team. The squadron soon began converting to the Hawker Hurricane fighter and in April 1939 Ward demonstrated the aircraft to Grigore Gafencu, the Romanian Minister of Foreign Affairs, who was in England on an official visit.

== Second World War ==
No. 151 Squadron saw little action after the initial outbreak of the Second World War, only called upon to shoot down stray barrage balloons and pursue unidentified aircraft. In February 1940, Ward, newly promoted to flying officer, was part of a detachment that operated from RAF Martlesham Heath for two months. Following the start of the German invasion of France and the Low Countries in May 1940, Ward and five other pilots delivered new Hurricanes to No. 87 Squadron, which was operating in France. Due to the high casualties in the squadron by the time of their arrival on 17 May, he and the other pilots opted to remain following the delivery of their aircraft.

Immediately sent into action, on 18 May, Ward was flying with a section of four Hurricanes when he destroyed a Henschel Hs 126 reconnaissance aircraft near Valenciennes. The following day, he damaged a Dornier Do 17 medium bomber. On 20 May any aircraft still serviceable with the squadron were ordered back to the United Kingdom. Ward took a Hurricane with no gunsight and few working instruments. Attempting to land in northern France to refuel, he saw fires in the town nearby as two Do 17s were making a bombing attack on the aerodrome. Attacking, he scoring hits on one and chased off the other. Ward was then attacked by several Messerschmitt Bf 109 fighters. Managing to evade them he was able to land at the aerodrome. After refuelling he took off and over the Channel ran into more Bf 109s. Ward dived to low level and reached RAF Debden safely. The irreverent nose art on the Hurricane he was ferrying back to the United Kingdom, a coat of arms featuring various unlucky symbols captioned by the phrase "So what the hell?", became widely associated with Ward but it was not actually his usual aircraft.

=== Battle of Britain ===
Ward remained with No. 87 Squadron through May and June while it began replenishing its losses and re-equipped for operational duties. In early July, with the Battle of Britain now well underway, it was sent to the RAF station at Exeter as part of No. 10 Group and tasked with covering the approaches to the ports and harbours along the southwest coast of England, including those of Bristol, Plymouth, and the Isle of Portland. It conducted day patrols over the next few months. On 8 August, Ward's flight started conducting night interceptions, operating from RAF Bibury. His involvement was brief, for a few days later he took over as the commander of a flight still operating from Exeter. On 15 August 1940, the squadron was involved in a large scale engagement with a group of 40 Junkers Ju 87 divebombers that was escorted by 60 Bf 109s and 20 Messerschmitt Bf 110 heavy fighters. During this action, Ward destroyed a Bf 110. In September, he alternated between night fighting duties and daylight operations. On 3 September, he damaged a German aircraft while on a night patrol. The frequency of night patrols conducted by No. 87 Squadron increased as the Luftwaffe switched to nighttime bombing raids.

The squadron continued night fighter operations through the winter months although the Hurricane was not a particularly effective aircraft for this work and did not achieve much success in the role. Ward, having been promoted to flight lieutenant, began advocating for nighttime intruder missions targeting Luftwaffe installations in occupied France. Approval was granted and he flew his first such mission on 9 April, strafing a facility at Caen. In spring 1941, while operating from RAF Charmy Down, the squadron began maintaining a detachment of Hurricanes at St Mary's, located off the coast of Cornwall and one of the Isles of Scilly. The intention was to protect the approach to England from the west and pilots would rotate in and out on a weekly basis. In July, Ward and another pilot, intercepted a group of German bombers attempting a raid on an aerodrome and damaged one of them.

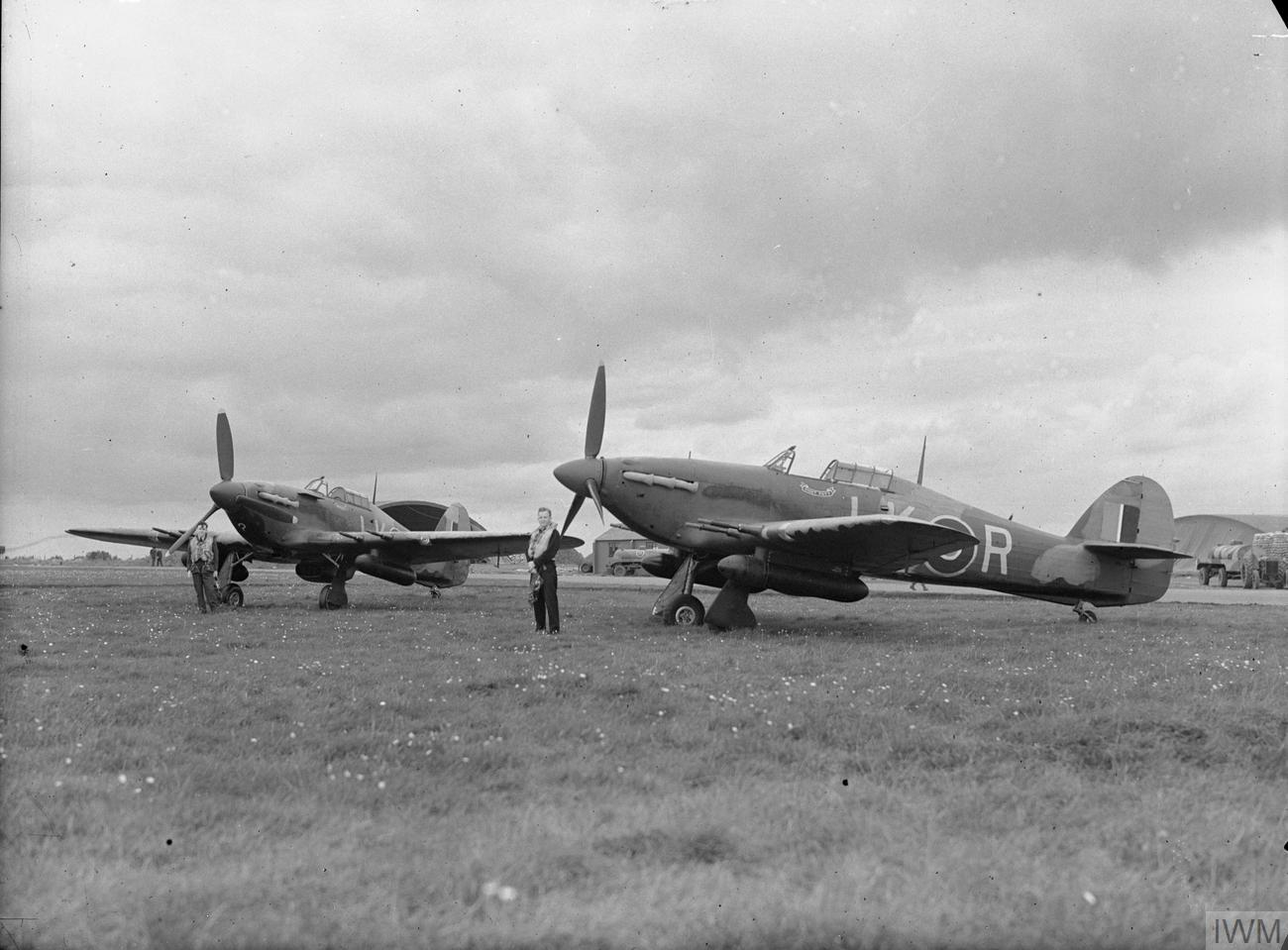
Hawker Hurricanes Mark IICs of No. 87 Squadron at Charmy Down

=== North Africa ===
In September 1941, Ward was promoted to squadron leader and posted to take command of No. 73 Squadron, which was based in Egypt on night defence duties as part of the campaign in North Africa against the Germans and Italians. His new command operated Hurricanes from Port Said. The following month, his award of the Distinguished Flying Cross (DFC) was announced. The citation for the DFC, published in the London Gazette read:

This officer fought with his squadron during the air operations in France and destroyed 2 enemy aircraft. Since September, 1940, he has commanded a flight engaged in night flying operations and has performed excellent work, particularly in the training of new pilots. In July, 1941, Flight Lieutenant Ward and another pilot intercepted a force of hostile aircraft which attempted to attack one of our aerodromes from a low altitude. Although the weather conditions were extremely unfavourable, at least 1 of the attacking aircraft was damaged. On another occasion, Flight Lieutenant Ward led a successful attack on the aerodrome at Caen. In spite of anti-aircraft opposition hits were believed to have been obtained on 2 enemy aircraft and, in addition a goods train was machine gunned together with buildings and gun-posts. This officer has always displayed the greatest keenness to engage the enemy.

— London Gazette, No. 35312, 14 October 1941.

From November 1941, Ward commanded a detached flight operating in the Western Desert with 'Whitforce', an ad hoc force of two squadrons of Bristol Blenheim light bombers operating from isolated airfields in support of Operation Crusader. Tasked with carrying out bomber escorts, offensive sweeps and attacks on enemy airfields, on 8 December 1941 he destroyed a Junkers Ju 88 medium bomber. Two days later, he damaged another Ju 88. By early 1942 Ward was often flying several sorties a day. He destroyed an Heinkel He 111 medium bomber off Tobruk on 9 February and claimed a Bf 109 as a probable four days later. The squadron started conducting strafing missions at night on enemy facilities. On one such mission, on 1 May 1942, while strafing Barce airfield at night, Ward saw a four-engined aircraft – probably a Focke-Wulf Fw 200 Condor long-range reconnaissance aircraft – and shot it down in flames. He was awarded a Bar to his DFC for this action. The published citation read:

This officer is a skilful and keen fighter pilot. One night in May, 1942, he led a formation of aircraft in an attack on Barce. The aerodrome and a dispersal area were successfully attacked and, during the operation, Squadron Leader Ward shot down a large aircraft which was approaching the aerodrome and engaged another before his ammunition was expended. This officer has served in France and Britain. He has destroyed 6 hostile aircraft.

— London Gazette, No. 35569, 19 May 1942.

Ward had spent much of May on leave and returned to duty on 1 June 1942. The next evening, he was scrambled to intercept a Ju 88, which he damaged. In early June 1942 the squadron returned to day operations, operating from Gambut in Libya where they conducted sweeps, escorted bombing raids, and carrying out covering patrols for supply convoys. On 17 June 1942, Ward's squadron was returning to base, very low on fuel, when they were attacked by four Bf 109s, led by the German flying ace Oberleutnant Hans-Joachim Marseille. Two Hurricanes were shot down by Marseille and their pilots bailed out. Most of the squadron had not noticed this and landed, but Ward returned to protect the pilots in their parachutes as they descended. While doing so, he was killed when his aircraft was shot down by Marseille. His Hurricane crashed near Gambut. At the time of his death, he was credited with the confirmed destruction of six enemy aircraft.

Ward was originally buried near his crashed Hurricane but his remains were later re-interred at the Halfaya Sollum War Cemetery in Egypt. In June 1944, his parents were presented with his DFC and Bar by the Governor-General of New Zealand, Cyril Newall, in a private ceremony at Auckland.
