= 102nd Battalion, CEF =

The distinguishing patch of the 102nd Battalion, CEF.

The 102nd Battalion, CEF, (initially the 102nd Battalion (Northern British Columbia), then after August, 1917, the 102nd Battalion (Central Ontario), CEF) was an infantry battalion of the Great War Canadian Expeditionary Force.

== History ==
The 102nd Battalion was authorized on 22 December 1915 and embarked for Britain on 18 June 1916. It disembarked in France on 12 August 1916, where it fought as part of the 11th Infantry Brigade, 4th Canadian Division in France and Flanders until the end of the war. The battalion disbanded on 30 August 1920.

The 102nd Battalion recruited in Northern British Columbia and was mobilized at Comox, on Vancouver Island.

During the attack on Vimy Ridge, the 102nd lost most of its officers and for a time was led by one of the company sergeant-majors. The battalion achieved its objectives for the day but lost 314 killed or wounded.

The 102nd Battalion had four Officers Commanding:

- Lt.-Col. John Weightman Warden, DSO, 18 June 1916 – 11 January 1918
- Lt.-Col. F. Lister, CMG, DSO, MC, 11 January 1918 – 27 September 1918
- Lt.-Col. E.J.W. Ryan, DSO, 28 September 1918 – 19 November 1918
- Lt.-Col. F. Lister, CMG, DSO, MC, 19 November 1918-Demobilization

Lt. Graham Thomson Lyall, VC.

One member of the 102nd Battalion, Lt. Graham Thomson Lyall was awarded the Victoria Cross for his actions on 27 September 1918 North of Cambrai, France, during the Battle of the Canal Du Nord.

== Battle honours ==
The 102nd Battalion was awarded the following battle honours:

- SOMME, 1916, 1 July–18 November 1916
- Ancre Heights, 1 October–11 November 1916
- Ancre, 1916
- ARRAS, 1917, '18
- Vimy, 1917, 9–14 April 1917
- HILL 70, 15–25 August 1917
- Ypres 1917, 31 July–10 November 1917
- Passchendaele, 12 October 1917 or 26 October–10 November 1917
- Amiens, 8–11 August 1918
- Scarpe, 1918, 26–30 August 1918
- Drocourt-Quéant
- Hindenburg Line, 12 September–9 October 1918
- Canal du Nord, 27 September–2 October 1918
- Valenciennes
- FRANCE AND FLANDERS, 1916-18

== Perpetuation ==
The 102nd Battalion, CEF is perpetuated by The British Columbia Regiment (Duke of Connaught's Own).

== See also ==
- List of infantry battalions in the Canadian Expeditionary Force

== Sources ==
- Canadian Expeditionary Force 1914–1919 by Col. G.W.L. Nicholson, CD, Queen's Printer, Ottawa, Ontario, 1962
