= Evelyn Lett =

- Born: Evelyn Story; October 17, 1896; Wawanesa, Manitoba
- Died: March 26, 1999 (aged 102)
- Spouse: Sherwood Lett
- Awards: Order of Canada

Evelyn Lett, OC (October 17, 1896 – March 26, 1999) was a Canadian women's rights pioneer. Born Evelyn Story in Wawanesa, Manitoba, she moved with her family to Vancouver, British Columbia in 1910.

== Personal life ==
In 1928, Evelyn Story married Sherwood Lett a Canadian soldier, lawyer, diplomat, and jurist. Sherwood and Evelyn Lett had two daughters, Mary and Frances.

== Education ==
Evelyn attended King Edward High School and excelled academically, winning the Governor-General's gold medal and a scholarship to the Vancouver branch of McGill University, the precursor to the University of British Columbia. She received a Bachelor of Arts degree in 1917 from the University of British Columbia (UBC), one of the first female graduates. She was also a founding member of the Alma Mater Society and helped give the UBC women the right to vote in 1914 before women could vote in Canada. She received her Master of Arts degree in 1926 from the University of British Columbia, Department of History. Her thesis, India and Nationhood, is one of UBC's First 100 Theses.

== Advocacy and Community Work ==
Evelyn helped establish the Women's Auxiliary of the Salvation Army and chaired the women's section of the United Way. She served on the board of the Vancouver General Hospital and the YWCA, and was a founding member of the Vancouver Art Gallery.

Following the Second World War, Evelyn Lett served on government commissions regarding the state of women's employment in Canada, including the Advisory Committee on Reconstruction as one of the members of the Subcommittee on the Post-War Problems of Women. Two women from British Columbia, Evelyn Lett and Grace MacInnis, were members of the subcommittee and they reported that women and their employers in Vancouver-area war plants saw "women as an integral part of the future economic structure." The 1944 report, entitled Post-war Problems of Women: Final Report of the Subcommittee, held that women should be allowed to make a choice to return to the domestic sphere or to continue in paid employment.

== Honours ==
The University of British Columbia (UBC) awarded Evelyn Lett with an honorary Doctor of Law LL.D degree in 1958. Norman MacKenzie, the president of UBC at the time, said that "her wide range of public services reflects the humanity, compassion and respect for learning which have made Evelyn Story Lett a woman, a graduate and a citizen whom we are proud and happy to honour."

In October 1958, she was presented with the Great Trekker Award from UBC. The Great Trekker Award was initiated in 1950 and is presented by the Alma Mater Society to a graduate of UBC who has achieved eminence in his or her chosen field of activity and made a worthy and special contribution to the community.

In 1996 the Alma Mater Society created an endowment to provide financial aid for students needing child care. The fund, the largest endowment of its kind at a Canadian university, was named in honour of Lett. She was also given a Lifetime Achievement Award by the Alumni Association, which she helped found.

In 1997, she was made an Officer of the Order of Canada for her "immense impact on the Vancouver community by raising hundreds of thousands of dollars for a seniors facility and a much-needed daycare centre for the University".
