= 29th Battalion, (Vancouver), CEF =

- The distinguishing patch of the 29th Battalion (Vancouver), CEF
- Active: 7 November 1914 - 30 August 1920
- Country: Canada
- Branch: Canadian Expeditionary Force
- Type: Infantry
- Size: Battalion
- Engagements: World War I

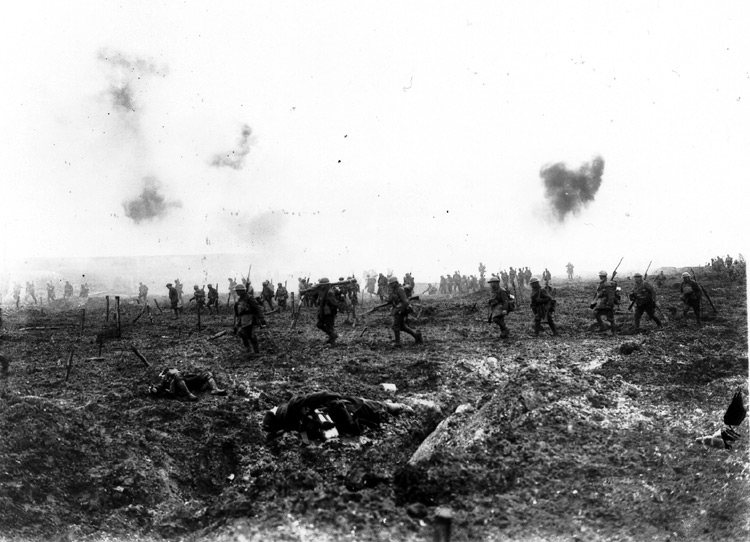
The 29th Battalion, Canadian Corps, 9 April 1917. Troops advance into no man's land at the Battle of Vimy Ridge.

The 29th Battalion (Vancouver), CEF was an infantry battalion of the Canadian Expeditionary Force during the Great War.

== History ==
Known as "Tobin's Tigers", the battalion was authorized on 7 November 1914 and embarked for Britain on 20 May 1915. It disembarked in France on 17 September 1915, where it fought as part of the 6th Canadian Infantry Brigade, 2nd Canadian Division in France and Flanders until the end of the war. The battalion was disbanded on 30 August 1920.

The 29th Battalion recruited in Vancouver and New Westminster, British Columbia and was mobilized at Vancouver.

Raised by Lieutenant-Colonel Tobin on 24 October 1914 in Vancouver, British Columbia, the 29th derived its manpower from the Duke of Connaught's Own Rifles and the Irish Fusiliers of Canada. The SS Missanabie transported the battalion to England in May 1915. Subordinated to the 6th Canadian Brigade, 2nd Canadian Division, the 29th consisted of 37 officers and 1,104 other ranks.

The 29th Battalion had eight Commanding Officers:

- Lt.-Col. H.S. Tobin, 20 May 1915 – 20 July 1916
- Lt.-Col. J.S. Tait, 20 August 1916 – 10 September 1916
- Lt.-Col. J.M. Ross, 10 September 1916 – 16 December 1916
- Lt.-Col. J.S. Tait, 16 December 1916 – 22 January 1917
- Lt.-Col. J.M. Ross, DSO, 22 January 1917 – 23 July 1917
- Lt.-Col. W.S. Latta, DSO, 23 July 1917 – 16 August 1918
- Maj. L.A. Wilmot, MC, 16 August 1918 – 5 September 1918
- Lt.-Col. H.S. Tobin, DSO, 5 September 1918-Demobilization

One member of the 29th Battalion, Company Sergeant-Major (Warrant Officer Class II) Robert Hill Hanna was awarded the Victoria Cross for his actions on August 21, 1917, at Hill 70 near Lens, France.

== Battle honours ==
The 29th Battalion was awarded the following battle honours:

- MOUNT SORREL
- SOMME, 1916, '18
- Flers-Courcelette
- Thiepval
- Ancre Heights
- ARRAS, 1917, '18
- Vimy, 1917
- Scarpe, 1917, '18
- HILL 70
- Ypres 1917
- Passchendaele
- AMIENS
- HINDENBURG LINE
- Drocourt-Quéant
- Canal du Nord
- Cambrai, 1918
- PURSUIT TO MONS
- FRANCE AND FLANDERS, 1915–18

== Perpetuation ==
The 29 Battalion's lineage was perpetuated by the 2nd Battalion, British Columbia Regiment – constituted in 1920. Subsequent amalgamation in 1936 absorbed the 29th's history into that of the Irish Fusiliers of Canada (The Vancouver Regiment), which was placed on the Supplementary Order of Battle in 1965. On 13 June 2002, The Irish Fusiliers of Canada (The Vancouver Regiment) was amalgamated with The British Columbia Regiment (Duke of Connaught's Own).

The 29th Battalion is currently perpetuated by The British Columbia Regiment (Duke of Connaught's Own).

== See also ==
- List of infantry battalions in the Canadian Expeditionary Force

== Sources ==
Canadian Expeditionary Force 1914–1919 by Col. G. W. L. Nicholson, CD, Queen's Printer, Ottawa, Ontario, 1962
