= Larwill Park =

Former park in Vancouver, Canada

Coordinates: 49°16′46.43″N 123°6′42.96″W

Larwill Park, also known as the Cambie Street Grounds, is a former park and sporting field in what is now downtown Vancouver, British Columbia, Canada. Larwill Park was the location of the bus depot of Pacific Coach Stage Lines and Greyhound Bus Lines from World War II until 1993, when the bus depot moved to Pacific Central Station. Since then, Larwill Park has been a parking lot. The Vancouver Art Gallery has selected it for the location of a new museum building.

== Location and history ==
Bounded by Cambie, Dunsmuir, Beatty and Georgia Streets, the former park occupied a whole city block and was laid out at the time of the CPR Townsite survey in the early 1880s. It was Vancouver's second sporting grounds, the first being on Brockton Point in what is now Stanley Park, and was used for various sports. A house on the corner of the lot was occupied by an Alfred Larwill ("Al" or "Fred"), who good-naturedly stored a variety of game equipment in his toolshed and allowed team members to use his dining room as a dressing room.

Located midway between the city's old downtown around Hastings Street in Gastown and newer areas uptown around Granville, the park naturally became a centre for public meetings, the most infamous a rally by the Knights of Labour, which led to the 1907 Vancouver anti-Asian riots, with the Beatty Street Drill Hall, across Beatty Street on the block's northeast flank, serving as a stage and podium. Baseball, cricket and lacrosse teams made use of the field year round. The playing fields also served as military drill-grounds, with the city's first muster being called up for the Boer War using the site for that purpose, as well as for World Wars I and II. The site was also a main site for rallies by the unemployed and labour organizations in the 1930s.

In July 1943 (during World War II), a ceremony was held to dedicate the park to Al Larwill, some 32 years after his death in 1911. However, later that year, while the men who had used it for sport and politics were away at war and not around to prevent it, the site was converted into the bus depot.

== 2010 Olympics ==
Often used for parking by Canada Post trucks and for film production "circuses", the lot was one of two main sites for cultural events and "nightly celebrations", although not an official venue, during the 2010 Winter Olympics.

== Future Vancouver Art Gallery site ==
After the bus depot vacated Larwill Park in 1993, it became the only block of vacant public land in downtown Vancouver. It was proposed as a location for various cultural facilities, including the Vancouver Art Gallery. On April 24, 2013, Vancouver City Council voted to designate the property as the site for a new art gallery building. On September 29, 2015, the gallery unveiled drawings by architects Herzog & de Meuron for a new museum building. Relocating to Larwill Park will double the gallery's exhibition space. They were to break ground in 2017, but construction was delayed until funding was secured.
