= Stephen Lett =

Canadian physician (1847–1905)

Stephen Lett (born 1949 -) was born in Ireland but raised and educated in British North American which when he was about 20 became Canada. He became a physician and was the superintendent of an asylum. He was also a well known medical writer. He was one of the founders of the Homewood Asylum in Guelph, Ontario. and its first medical superintendent.
