= Steven Lett =

American diplomat

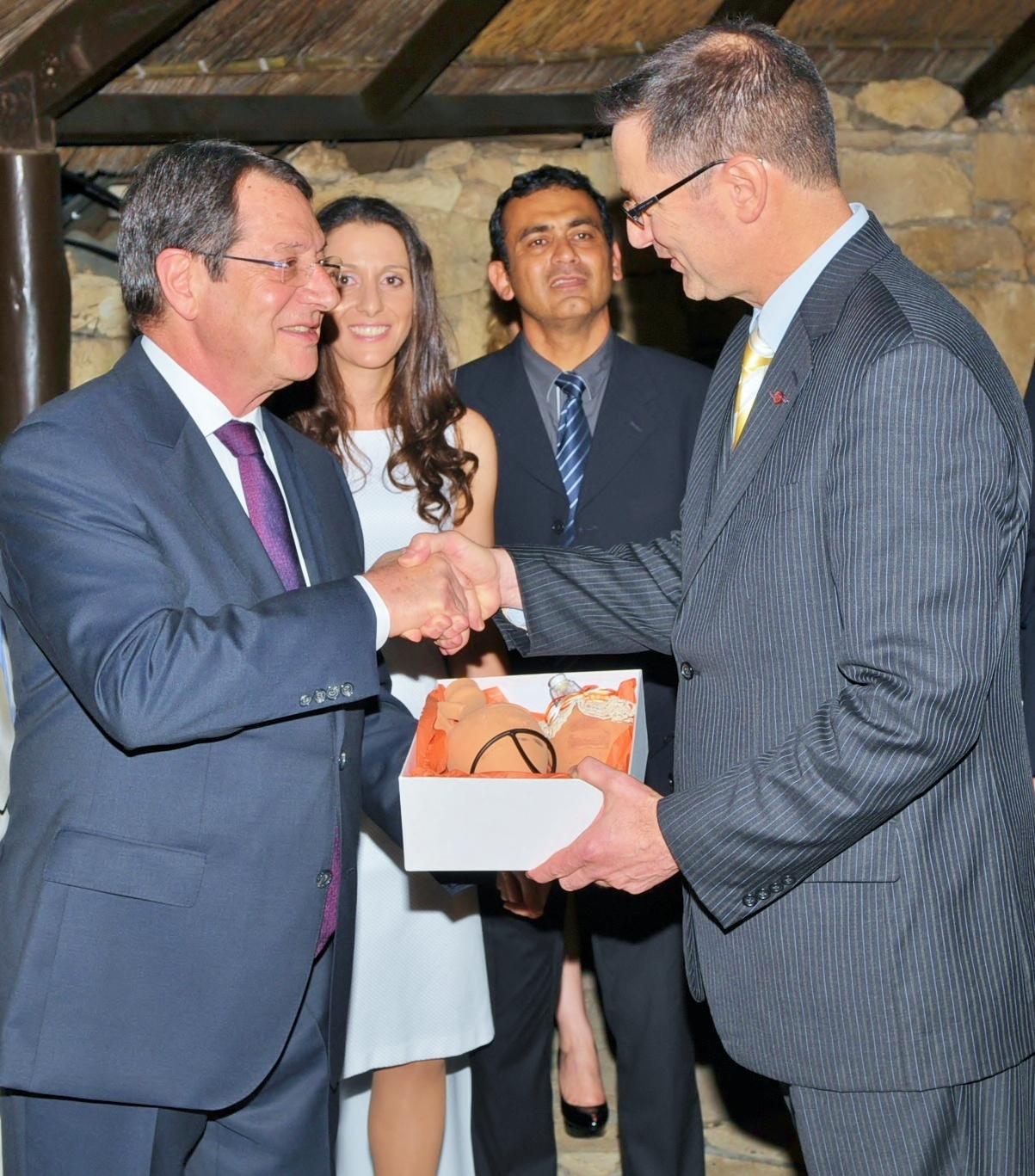
- Steven Lett (right) receiving traditional gifts from Cypriot President Nicos Anastasiades at an official dinner on the occasion of Cospas-Sarsat meetings in Limassol, Cyprus, 14 June 2013

Head of Cospas-Sarsat Secretariat
- In office 1 August 2011 – 16 September 2024
- Preceded by: Daniel Levesque (France)
- Succeeded by: Shefali Juneja (India)

Personal details
- Born: 1958 (age 67–68) United States
- Education: Duke University, National Defense University
- Occupation: Diplomat and Engineer

Steven Lett (born 1958) is a former American diplomat and former chief executive (Head of Secretariat) of the International Cospas-Sarsat Programme in Montreal, Quebec, Canada.

Prior to joining Cospas-Sarsat, Lett was Deputy United States Coordinator for International Communications and Information Policy, immediately under Ambassadors Philip L. Verveer (2009–2011), David A. Gross (2001–2009) and Vonya B. McCann (1994–1999) at the U.S. Department of State. He directed the Office of Technology and Security Policy and was responsible for strategic international policy-making and diplomatic outreach for issues that included telecommunications and Internet security, the international satellite market, and emerging technologies. He was the U.S. representative at the 150-nation International Telecommunications Satellite Organization (ITSO, known as Intelsat prior to privatization of Intelsat's commercial activities in 2001), and the 34-nation Organisation for Economic Co-operation and Development’s (OECD's) Committee for Information, Computer and Communications Policy. He headed U.S. delegations in the 95-nation International Mobile Satellite Organization (IMSO, known as Inmarsat prior to privatization of Inmarsat's commercial activities in 1999). Lett also has participated in committees and conferences of the United Nations, the International Civil Aviation Organization, the International Maritime Organization, and the International Telecommunication Union where topics included the use of technology to advance aviation and maritime safety and security, improved access to information and communications technologies for the world's poor, and greater efficiency in the international management of radio spectrum and satellite orbits. He has testified about satellite matters before the U.S. Senate.

Prior to joining the State Department in 1989, Lett was a member of the U.S. Federal Communications Commission's International Conference Staff and Common Carrier Bureau. There he worked on rule-making proceedings related to the international telecommunications market, and headed delegations to resolve radio-interference concerns impacting satellite operations of the United States and other countries.

Lett completed bachelor's degree programs at Duke University (Durham, NC, USA) in Electrical Engineering, and in Public Policy, and holds a Master of Science degree with distinction from the National Defense University's Dwight D. Eisenhower School for National Security and Resource Strategy (Washington, DC, USA) where he studied, among other things, disaster management.
