= 158th Battalion (The Duke of Connaught's Own), CEF =

The 158th (Duke of Connaught's Own) Battalion, CEF was a unit in the Canadian Expeditionary Force during the First World War. Based in Vancouver, British Columbia, the unit began recruiting in late 1915 in that city. After sailing to England in November 1916, the battalion was absorbed into the 1st Reserve Battalion on January 6, 1917. The 158th (Duke of Connaughts Own) Battalion, CEF had one Officer Commanding: Lieut-Col. C. Milne.

The 158th Battalion is perpetuated by The British Columbia Regiment (Duke of Connaught's Own).
