= Sherwood Lett =

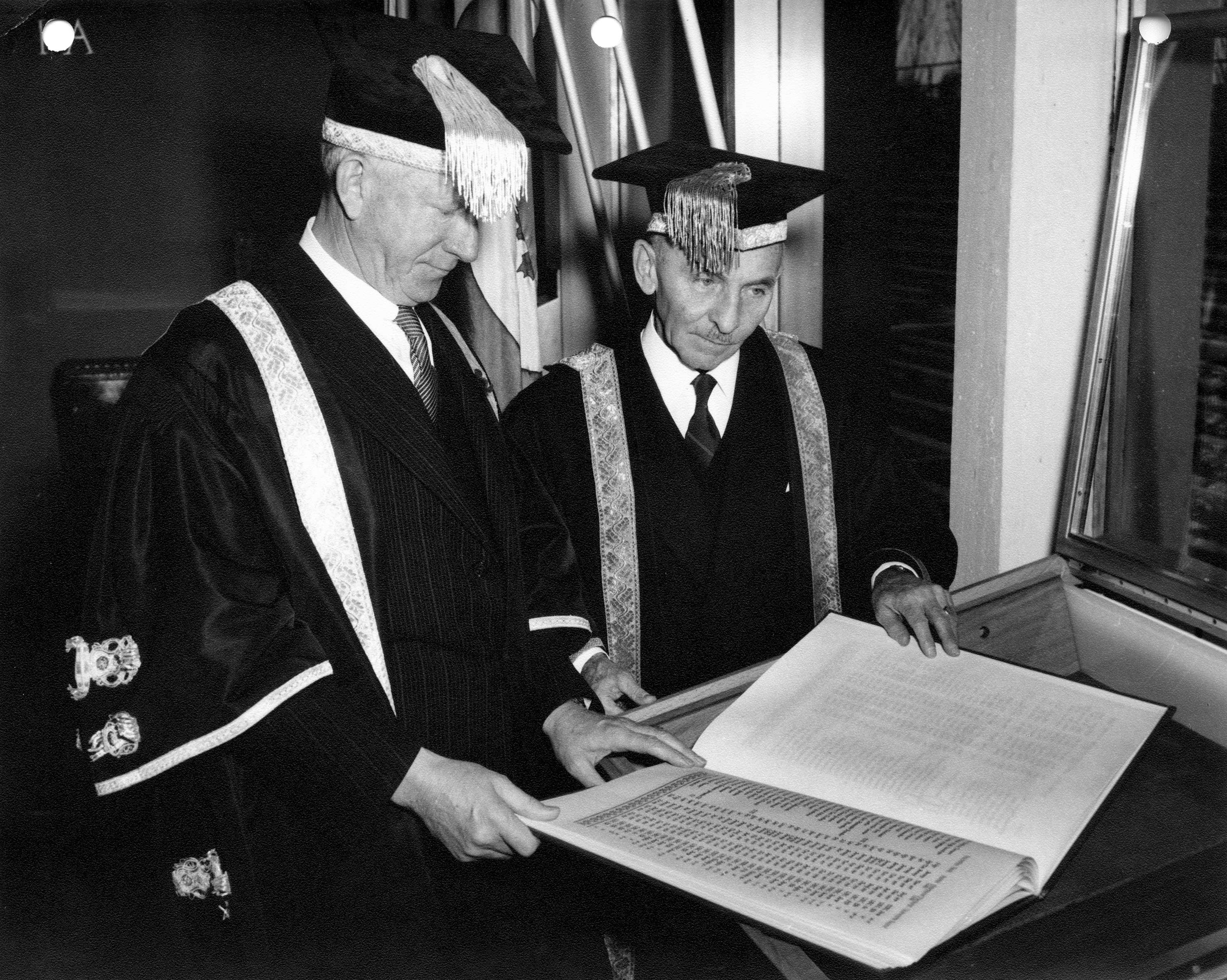
- Norman MacKenzie and Sherwood Lett (right) examining Roll of Service
- Born: August 1, 1895; Iroquois, Ontario, Canada
- Died: July 24, 1964 (aged 68); Vancouver, British Columbia, Canada
- Education: University of British Columbia; Trinity College, Oxford
- Spouse: Evelyn Lett
- Awards: Order of the British Empire

Sherwood Lett, CBE DSO MC ED QC (August 1,1895 – July 24,1964) was a Canadian soldier, lawyer, diplomat, and jurist.

== Early life ==
Sherwood Lett was born in Iroquois, Ontario, but the family then moved to British Columbia.

His university studies occurred at a time of transition: he entered McGill University College of British Columbia just as it became the independent University of British Columbia and in 1915, he became the first President of the UBC Alma Mater Society. He received his Bachelor of Arts degree in 1916.

In private life, he was married to Evelyn Story, whom he married in 1928 and with whom he had two daughters.

== World War I ==
During World War I, he volunteered for the Canadian Expeditionary Force and served with The Irish Fusiliers of Canada. He was wounded in 1918 and he was awarded the Military Cross.

== Between the wars ==
In 1919 he was awarded a Rhodes Scholarship and received a Bachelor of Arts in jurisprudence at Oxford University.

In 1923 he joined the law firm of Davis & Company, where he practiced corporate and taxation law. He practised at the same firm until 1963.

He was a member of the Senate of the University of British Columbia from 1924 to 1957 and was a member of the Board of Governors from 1935 to 1940 and from 1951 to 1957.

== World War II ==
In 1939, he rejoined the Canadian Army as a Brigadier and was the Commanding Officer of the South Saskatchewan Regiment in England in 1941.

In 1942, he was the commander of the 4th Canadian Infantry Brigade and took part in The Battle of Dieppe. He was wounded in the battle but his leadership was recognized with the award of the Distinguished Service Order.

After his recovery he was, from 1943 to 1944, the Deputy Chief of the General Staff. In 1944, he resumed command of the 4th Canadian Brigade and took part in the Battle of Normandy; he received a further wound in this campaign.

For his war-service overall, he was made a Commander of the Order of the British Empire.

== Post-war ==
After the war, he re-joined his law practice at Davis & Company. In 1947, Lett declined an appointment to the Supreme Court of Canada from Prime Minister William Lyon Mackenzie King.

Canadian Commissioner of ICC

In 1954, he became the Canadian Commissioner for the International Control Commission, in charge of the Canadian delegation and with Saul Rae as his deputy. The ICC was the international monitoring force established in 1954 to oversee implementation of the Geneva Accords which ended the First Indochina War and brought about the Partition of Vietnam.

Chancellor of UBC

From 1951 to 1957, he was the Chancellor of the University of British Columbia. He was awarded an honorary LL.D from the University of British Columbia in 1945.

CJ of Supreme Court of BC

In 1963, he was appointed Chief Justice of the Supreme Court of British Columbia; he died in office the following year.

Prime Minister Lester Pearson said of him:

                        "I know of no Canadian who has served his country in war and peace with greater distinction and more unselfishly."

== Sources ==
- "The Generals of WWII: Generals from Canada".
- "Davis LLP: Our History".
- "UBC Senate Memorial Tributes".
- Stacey, Col. C.P. (1960). The Victory Campaign: The Operations in Northwest Europe, 1944-45. Queen's Printer.

Academic offices
Preceded by Eric W. Hamber	Chancellor of the University of British Columbia; 1951–1957	Succeeded by Albert E. Grauer
