= British Columbia Regiment (Duke of Connaught's Own) =

Canadian Army reserve unit

The British Columbia Regiment (Duke of Connaught's Own)
- Active: 12 October 1883–present
- Country: Canada
- Branch: Canadian Army
- Type: Armoured reconnaissance
- Role: To obtain timely and accurate information that both satisfies the commanders information requirements and is provided quickly enough to be incorporated into the commanders operational planning process.
- Part of: 39 Canadian Brigade Group
- Garrison/HQ: Beatty Street Drill Hall, Vancouver
- Nickname: "The Dukes"
- Patron: Prince Arthur, Duke of Connaught and Strathearn
- Motto: Faugh a ballagh (Irish for 'Clear the way')
- March: "I'm Ninety-Five"
- Engagements: Second Boer War; First World War; Second World War; War in Afghanistan
- Battle honours: List of battle honours: South Africa, 1900; Ypres, 1915, '17; Gravenstafel; St. Julien; Festubert, 1915; Mount Sorrel; Somme, 1916, '18; Flers–Courcelette; Thiepval; Ancre Heights; Ancre, 1916; Arras, 1917, '18; Vimy, 1917; Arleux; Hill 70; Passchendaele; Amiens; Scarpe, 1917, '18; Drocourt–Quéant; Hindenburg Line; Canal du Nord; Cambrai, 1918; Valenciennes; France and Flanders, 1915–18; Falaise; Falaise Road; The Laison; Chambois; The Scheldt; The Lower Maas; The Rhineland; The Hochwald; Veen; Twente Canal; Küsten Canal; Bad Zwischenahn; North-West Europe, 1944–1945; Afghanistan
- Website: army.gc.ca/en/3-canadian-division/the-british-columbia-regiment/index.page

Commanders
- Commanding officer: LCol Adam Brown, CD
- Regimental sergeant major: CWO Arnold Matibag

Insignia
- NATO Map Symbol
- Abbreviation: BCR (DCO)

The British Columbia Regiment (Duke of Connaught's Own) is a Primary Reserve armoured reconnaissance (recce) regiment of the Canadian Army; the regiment is subordinate to 39 Canadian Brigade Group of the 3rd Canadian Division. Established in 1883, it is the oldest military unit in Vancouver, British Columbia, Canada. It parades at the Beatty Street Drill Hall at the corner of Dunsmuir and Beatty in Downtown Vancouver. The regiment has been variously designated as garrison artillery, rifles, infantry, and armoured, but has been reconnaissance since 1965. It has received 41 battle honours, and has been a unit of the Royal Canadian Armoured Corps since 1942.

== Lineage ==
=== The British Columbia Regiment (Duke of Connaught's Own) ===
The camp flag of The BCR.

The British Columbia Regiment (Duke of Connaught's Own) originated in Victoria, British Columbia on 12 October 1883, when the British Columbia Provisional Regiment of Garrison Artillery was formed. It was redesignated as the British Columbia Brigade of Garrison Artillery on 7 May 1886, as the British Columbia Battalion of Garrison Artillery on 1 January 1893, as the 5th British Columbia Battalion of Garrison Artillery on 1 January 1895 and the 5th British Columbia Regiment, Canadian Artillery on 28 December 1895. The regiment was reorganized and split into two battalions on 1 July 1896, designated the 1st Battalion (now the 5th (British Columbia) Field Artillery Regiment, RCA) and 2nd Battalion, which was detached and converted to infantry and redesignated the 6th Battalion Rifles on 1 August 1899, with headquarters in Vancouver. It was redesignated the 6th Regiment The Duke of Connaught's Own Rifles on 1 May 1900.

Following the Great War on 12 March 1920, the 6th Regiment The Duke of Connaught's Own Rifles was amalgamated with the 104th Regiment (Westminster Fusiliers of Canada), now The Royal Westminster Regiment, and redesignated as the 1st British Columbia Regiment. It was redesignated the 1st British Columbia Regiment (Duke of Connaught's Own) on 1 November 1920. On 15 May 1924 it was reorganized into three separate regiments, designated The Vancouver Regiment, The Westminster Regiment and the 1st British Columbia Regiment (Duke of Connaught's Own). The 1st British Columbia Regiment (Duke of Connaught's Own) was redesignated The British Columbia Regiment (Duke of Connaught's Own Rifles) on 15 January 1930 and the 2nd (Reserve) Battalion, The British Columbia Regiment, (Duke of Connaught's Own Rifles) on 7 November 1940. The regiment was converted to armour and redesignated the 13th Armoured Regiment (The British Columbia Regiment), RCAC, on 1 April 1946, The British Columbia Regiment (Duke of Connaught's Own) (13th Armoured Regiment) on 4 February 1949, The British Columbia Regiment (Duke of Connaught's Own) (RCAC), on 19 May 1958 and finally The British Columbia Regiment (Duke of Connaught's Own) on 7 October 1985. On 13 June 2002, it was amalgamated with The Irish Fusiliers of Canada (The Vancouver Regiment).

== Perpetuations ==
The British Columbia Regiment (Duke of Connaughts' Own) perpetuates the 7th Battalion (1st British Columbia), CEF, the 29th (Vancouver) Battalion, CEF, the 30th Battalion, CEF, the 62nd Battalion (British Columbia), CEF, the 102nd Battalion CEF, the 121st Battalion (Western Irish), CEF, and the 158th Battalion (The Duke of Connaught's Own), CEF.

== History ==
=== Early history ===
The 6th Battalion Rifles contributed volunteers for the Canadian Contingents during the South African War.

In 1914 the regiment was involved in the Komagata Maru incident.

=== The Great War ===
The distinguishing patch of the 7th Battalion (1st British Columbia), CEF.

The 6th Regiment The Duke of Connaught's Own Rifles and the 11th Regiment Irish Fusiliers of Canada were placed on active service on 6 August 1914 for local protection duties.

The 7th Battalion (1st British Columbia), CEF was authorized on 10 August 1914 and sailed for Britain on 28 September 1914. The 7th Battalion disembarked in France on 15 February 1915, where it fought as part of the 2nd Infantry Brigade, 1st Canadian Division in France and Flanders until the end of the war. The battalion was disbanded on 30 August 1920.

The distinguishing patch of the 29th Battalion (Vancouver), CEF.

The 29th Battalion (Vancouver), CEF, known as "Tobin's Tigers", was authorized on 7 November 1914 and embarked for Britain on 20 May 1915. It arrived in France on 17 September 1915, where it fought as part of the 6th Infantry Brigade, 2nd Canadian Division in France and Flanders until the end of the war. The battalion was disbanded on 30 August 1920.

The 102nd Battalion, CEF, was authorized on 22 December 1915 and embarked for Britain on 18 June 1916, arriving in France on 12 August 1916, where it fought as part of the 11th Infantry Brigade, 4th Canadian Division in France and Flanders until the end of the war. The battalion was disbanded on 30 August 1920.

The distinguishing patch of the 102nd Battalion, CEF.

The 30th Battalion, CEF, was authorized on 27 October 1914 and embarked for Britain on 23 February 1915. It was redesignated the 30th Reserve Battalion, CEF, on 18 April 1915 to provide reinforcements for units in the field. On 4 January 1917 its personnel were absorbed by the 1st Reserve Battalion, CEF.

The 62nd Battalion (British Columbia), CEF, was authorized on 20 April 1915 and embarked for Britain on 20 March 1916, where it provided reinforcements for the Canadian Corps in the field until 6 July 1916 when its personnel were absorbed by the 30th Reserve Battalion, CEF.

The 121st Battalion (Western Irish), CEF, was authorized on 22 December 1915 and embarked for Britain on 14 November 1916, where it provided reinforcements for Canadian units in the field until 10 January 1917 when its personnel were absorbed by the 16th Reserve Battalion, CEF.

The 158th Battalion (The Duke of Connaught's Own), CEF, was authorized on 22 December 1915 and embarked for Britain on 14 November 1916 where it provided reinforcements for the units in the field until 4 January 1917 when its personnel were absorbed by the 1st Reserve Battalion, CEF.

=== The Second World War ===
The British Columbia Regiment (Duke of Connaught's Own Rifles) was called out on service on 26 August 1939 and details of the regiment were placed on active service on 1 September 1939 for local protection duties under the designation The British Columbia Regiment (Duke of Connaught's Own Rifles), CASF (Details). Details from the Irish Fusiliers were called out on service on 26 August 1939 and then on active service on 1 September 1939, as the Irish Fusiliers (Vancouver Regiment), CASF (Details), for local protection duties. The 102nd Battery was called out on service on 26 August 1939 and details of the battery were placed on active service on 1 September 1939 as the 102nd (North British Columbia) Heavy Battery, RCA, CASF (Details), for local protection duties. The details of the three units called out on active service were disbanded on 31 December 1940.

The British Columbia Regiment (Duke of Connaught's Own Rifles), CASF, mobilized for active service on 24 May 1940. It was redesignated as the 1st Battalion, The British Columbia Regiment (Duke of Connaught's Own Rifles), CASF, on 7 November 1940. It was converted to armour and redesignated the 28th Armoured Regiment (The British Columbia Regiment), CAC, CASF, on 26 January 1942; and then the 28th Armoured Regiment (The British Columbia Regiment), RCAC, CASF, on 2 August 1945. On 21 August 1942 it embarked for Britain. The regiment landed in France on 28 July 1944 as part of the 4th Armoured Brigade, 4th Canadian Armoured Division and continued to serve in North West Europe until the end of the war. The overseas regiment was disbanded on 15 February 1946.

The 1st Battalion, Irish Fusiliers (Vancouver Regiment), CASF, mobilized for active service on 1 January 1941. The battalion served in Canada in a home defence role as part of the 18th Infantry Brigade, 6th Canadian Division; and in Jamaica on garrison duty from 18 May 1943 to 6 August 1944. On 10 January 1945 it embarked for Britain, where it was disbanded on 19 January 1945 to provide reinforcements to the Canadian Army in the field. The 3rd Battalion, Irish Fusiliers (Vancouver Regiment), CASF, mobilized for active service on 12 May 1942. This unit served in Canada in a home defence role as part of the 19th Infantry Brigade of Pacific Command. The 3rd Battalion was disbanded on 15 August 1943.

The 102nd (North British Columbia) Heavy Battery, RCA, CASF, mobilized for active service on 1 January 1941. It was redesignated as the 102nd Coast Battery, RCA, CASF, on 1 May 1942. This unit served in Canada in a home defence role with the 17th (North British Columbia) Coast Regiment, RCA, CASF, as part of Pacific Command. The battery was disbanded on 31 October 1945.

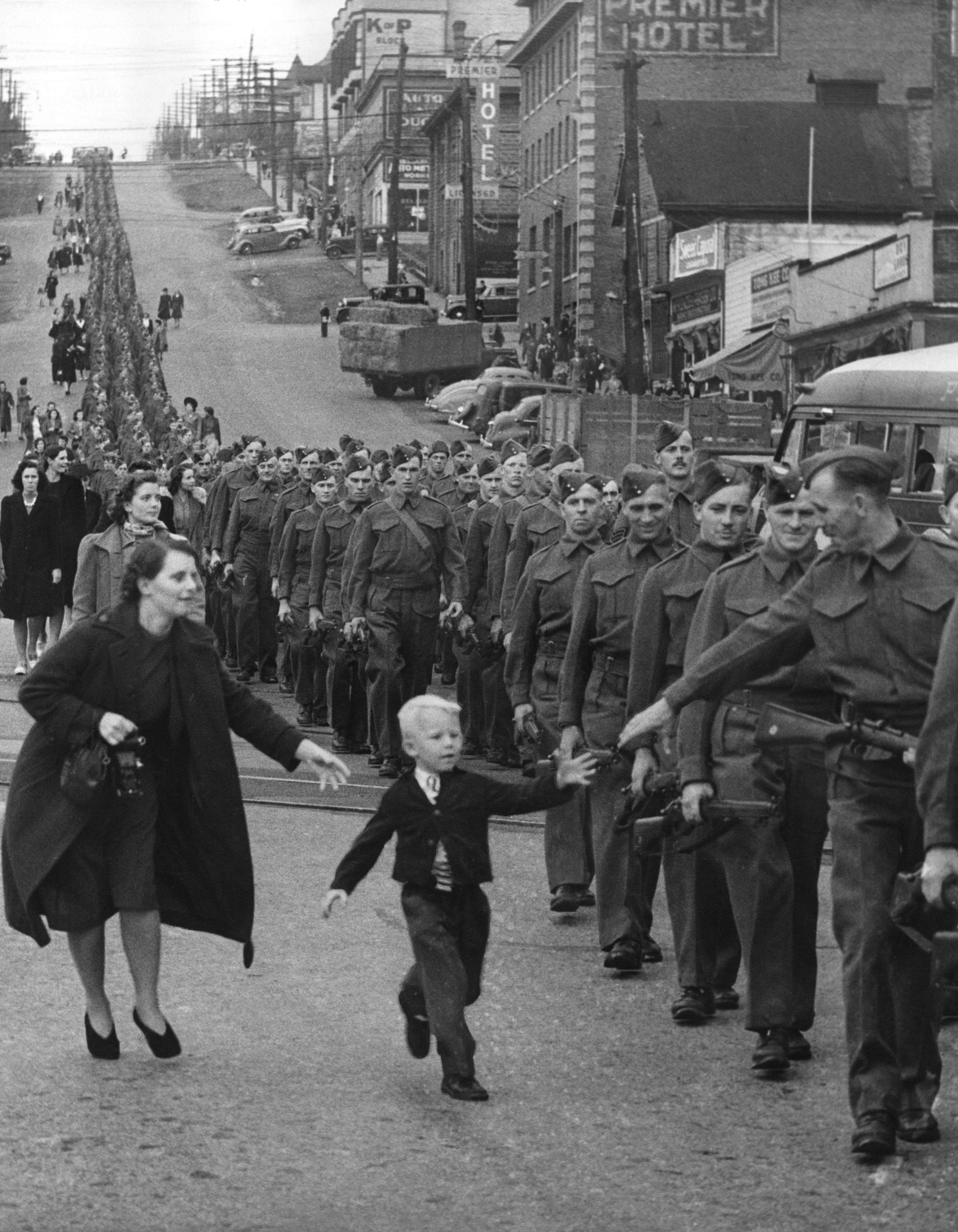
The British Columbia Regiment (Duke of Connaught's Own), marching in New Westminster, 1940. As a rifle regiment, weapons are carried "at the trail" rather than at the slope. Wait for Me, Daddy is one of the most famous and reprinted Canadian WW2 Photos. The father survived the war.

The British Columbia Regiment (Duke of Connaught's Own Rifles) was called out at 4:15 a.m. on August 26, 1939, two weeks prior to the official declaration of war by the Canadian governor general. Soldiers were dispatched to various vulnerable areas in the city, largely as a precautionary measure in response to Adolf Hitler's increasing aggression towards Poland. The British Columbia Regiment trained in Canada until January 1942, when it was announced that the 4th Division would become an armoured division. As a result, the unit was re-designated as the 28th Armoured Regiment (The British Columbia Regiment), and its officers and men were sent to England for training. In August 1943, Lieutenant-Colonel D.G. Worthington became the commanding officer of the regiment. In October, the regiment began to receive the M4 Sherman tanks, gradually replacing the Canadian-made Ram tanks, which had been in use for training.

Following the Allied invasion of Europe on D-Day, the regiment embarked for France on July 23 and landed in Normandy on July 26. The regiment saw its first action in the Second World War during Operation Totalize, on August 8, 1944. The operation was launched under the cover of darkness. To aid in navigation at night, searchlights had been pointed at the cloud cover to provide some illumination. 40 mm Bofors guns were also firing tracers along the line of advance to aid the attack. Despite these precautions, the 28th, accompanied by The Algonquin Regiment, became disoriented and navigated away from Hill 195, which was its objective, and steered instead towards Hill 140, but did not reach the hill before daybreak. As a result, when daylight came, the unit was in an exposed valley with units of the 12th SS Panzer Division concealed in the high ground. The two Canadian regiments were attacked by the 12th SS, who were equipped with 88 mm flak guns and Tiger tanks, among other heavy weapons. Lieutenant-Colonel Worthington was killed during the battle, and the survivors of the regiment managed to break contact with the 12th SS, after suffering 133 casualties and losing 48 out of 52 tanks. The 28th would return to action only a week later, contributing to the closing of the Falaise Pocket during Operation Tractable, which saw the destruction of the German Seventh Army and the capture of a great number of enemy soldiers and equipment.

After the closing of the Falaise Pocket, the regiment participated in the pursuit of retreating German forces into Belgium, as part of the First Canadian Army. A main objective of the Allied armies in Europe was the capture of major ports in order to ease the considerable logistical burden caused by the stretched supply lines, some of which extended hundreds of miles back to the invasion beaches in Normandy. The capture of a major port facility would allow the Allied armies to regain their momentum for the push into Germany. The port of Antwerp was selected as the target of the 21st Army Group for this reason. In October, as part of the Battle of the Scheldt, the regiment, as part of the First Canadian Army, took part in the essential task of clearing out the Scheldt Estuary to make the approach to the port of Antwerp safe for operation. On November 4, units from the Lake Superior Regiment (LSR) entered the village of St. Phillipsland and were informed by the civilian population that there were four small Kriegsmarine vessels docked at the harbour. The following day, a troop of tanks from C Squadron, together with units from the LSR opened fire while the vessels were docked and unable to escape. The vessels were attacked by the guns from the C Squadron tanks as well as 6-pounder antitank guns and mortars from the LSR. Three vessels were sunk and a fourth was severely damaged. Captain R. Styffe from the LSR later removed the log from one of the vessels and wrote as a final entry: "Gesunken by Lake Superior Regiment and British Columbia Regiment – Canadian Army." A member of the British Columbia Regiment recovered the ship's bell from one of the sunken vessels, and it now resides in the Officer's Mess at the Beatty St. Armoury. (One of the vessels sunk was likely AF-92 The Minute Book, an MFP (Marinefahrprahm), a landing craft type vessel of about 153 feet long, equipped to lay mines and armed with two 88 mm guns. The others were likely similar. The plaque on the bell in the Officer's Mess describes the vessel as an "escort".)

The regiment finished the war in Germany, after crossing the Rhine in April 1945. The regiment captured the town of Neuenhaus and administered it for a brief period. The final action of the war involved crossing the Kusten Canal on April 17, 1945. At the close of the war, the regiment had lost 108 officers and men killed, and 213 wounded. 105 Sherman tanks, 14 Stuart tanks, and one Crusader tank had been lost during the course of the war. These losses were the highest suffered by any regiment in the 4th or 5th Armoured Divisions. 14 new battle honours were added to the regiment's guidon as a result of its service during the Second World War. On February 1, 1946, the British Columbia Regiment returned to Vancouver, marching to the Beatty St. Armoury under the command of Lieutenant-Colonel J.W. Toogood.

=== Post-war to modern day ===
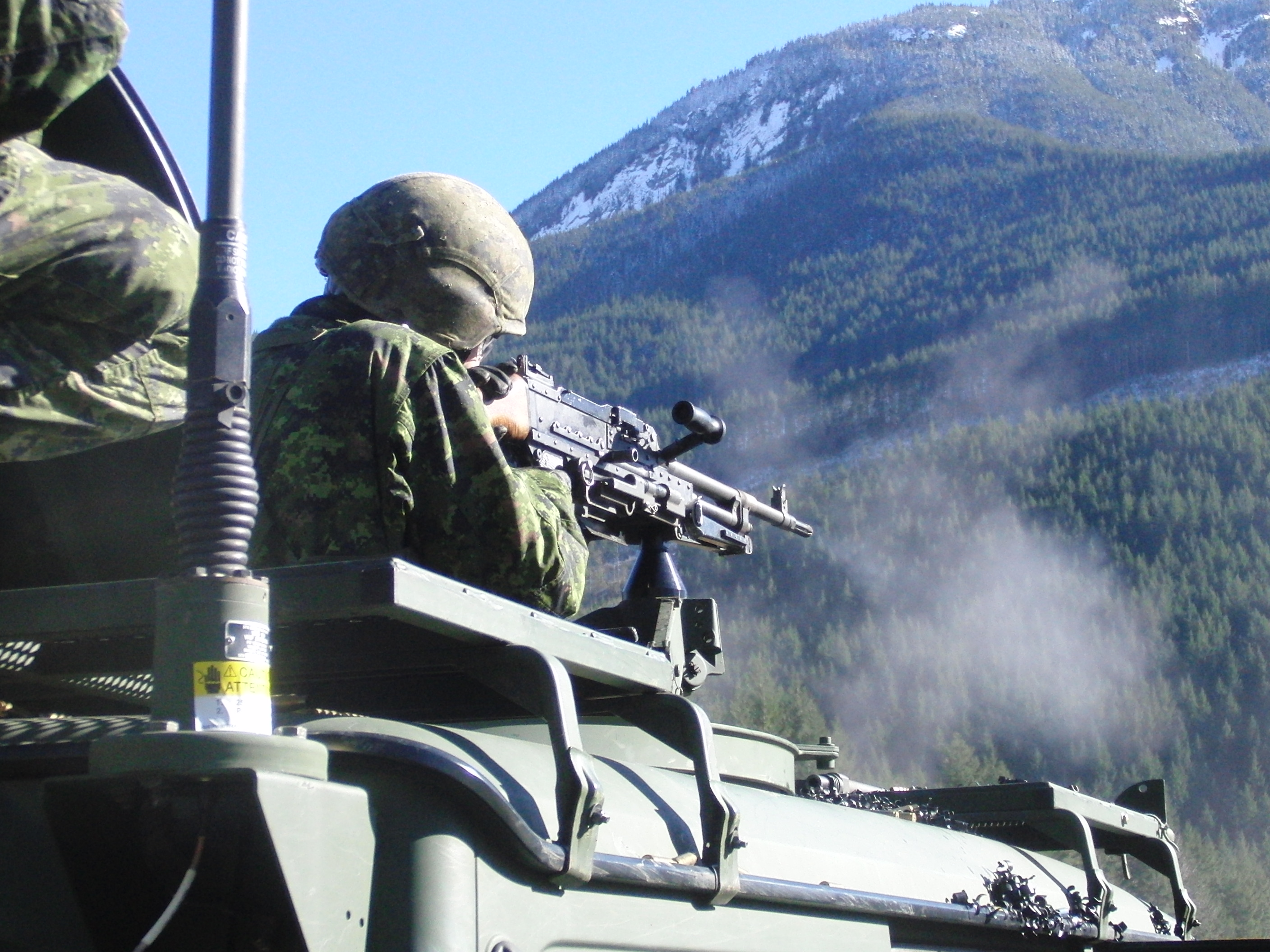
A soldier from the British Columbia Regiment (DCO) firing the C6 General Purpose Machine Gun mounted on a G-Wagon.

In April 1946, Duke of Connaught's Own Rifles and the 28th Armoured amalgamated into the 13th Armoured Regiment (The British Columbia Regiment), RCAC. Later, in 1949 the name was again changed, to The British Columbia Regiment (Duke of Connaught's Own) (13th Armoured Regiment). The regiment continued to train on the M4A2E8 Sherman tank, winning the Wallace Trophy for most efficient Militia unit in 1954, 1955 and 1956. Although the unit did not deploy to Korea as part of the Korean War, it did contribute volunteers to augment Lord Strathcona's Horse (Royal Canadians) and the Royal Canadian Dragoons, whose regiments were sent. Soldiers of the regiment also served in deployments to Germany during the Cold War.

On May 19, 1958, the regiment was redesignated again, becoming The British Columbia Regiment (Duke of Connaught's Own) (RCAC); the regiment's title dropped "(RCAC)" in 1985, but it remains part of the corps. On February 28, 1965, the regiment's role changed, and it became an armoured reconnaissance unit. The long-serving Sherman tanks were retired, and the unit converted to the M38A1 CDN Jeep. The Lynx reconnaissance vehicle entered service in the Canadian Army in 1968, to replace the Ferret armoured car currently serving in the reconnaissance role. The regiment cross-trained its soldiers to use the Lynx so that they could supplement regular army units overseas if necessary. In the 1987, the regiment received the Bombardier Iltis Jeep to replace the CJ7, itself a stopgap replacement for the aging M38A1, and the unit continued to train in the light reconnaissance role.

The Canadian Army began to change the Reserve concept in the late 1990s, into the year 2000. Reservists would now be trained to the equivalent levels of their Regular force counterparts to ensure that a reserve augmentee could better serve in a given role. Under this concept, the regiment continues to train its soldiers to support and augment regular force units whenever required, in addition to being ready to serve locally whenever required. Soldiers of the regiment have served overseas in Canadian United Nations missions, especially the former Yugoslavia. The regiment continues to contribute soldiers to the NATO mission in Afghanistan, usually attached to Lord Strathcona's Horse or the Royal Canadian Dragoons, operating the Leopard C2, Leopard 2A6 or Coyote Reconnaissance Vehicle. In 2004, the regiment retired its Iltis Jeeps, receiving the Mercedes-Benz G-Wagon Light Utility Vehicle, Wheeled, in the C&R (command and reconnaissance) version. The G-Wagons are built to accept a lightweight applique armour kit, and are usually armed with either the C9A1 Light Machine Gun or C6 General Purpose Machine Gun in a manually operated turret.

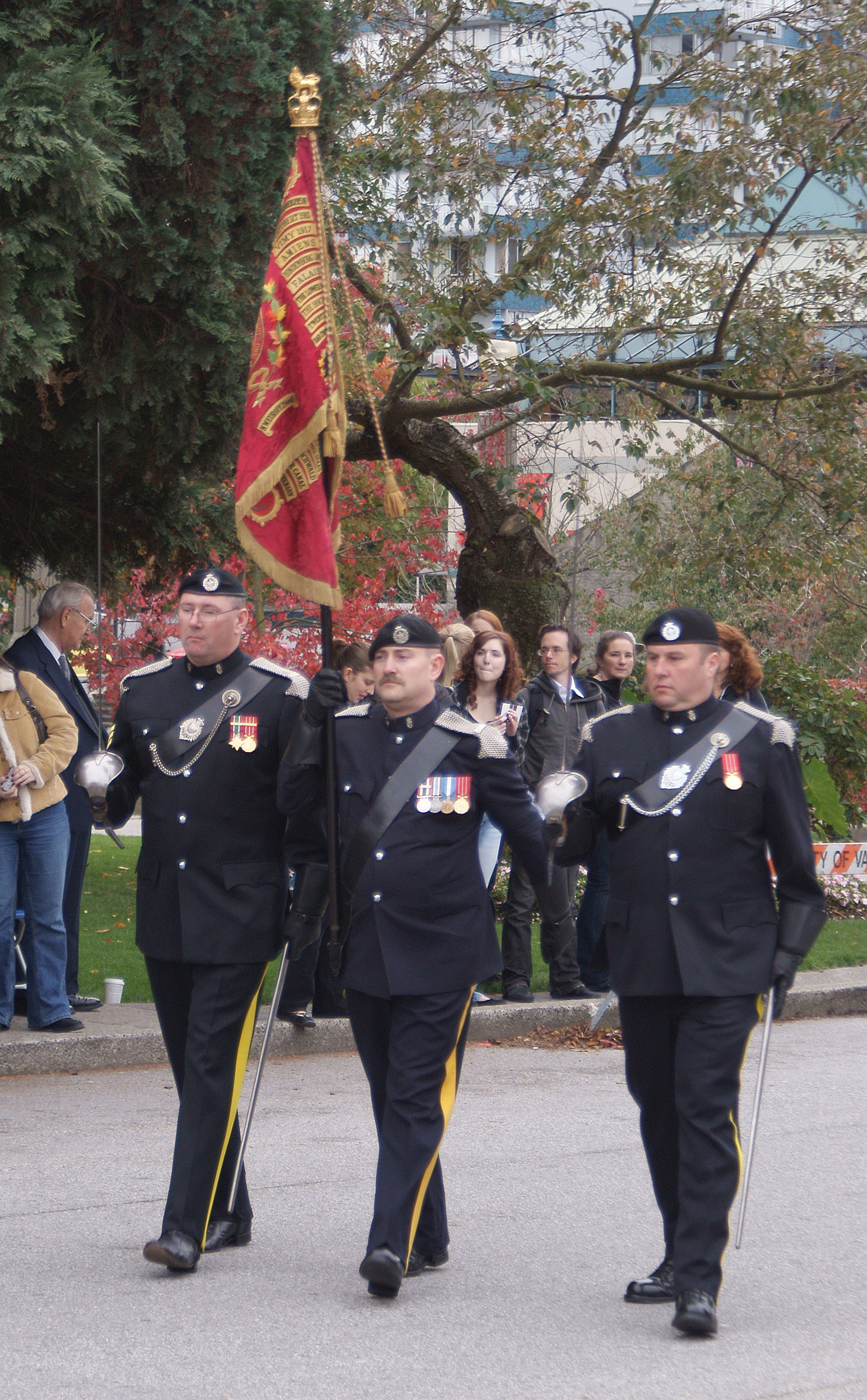
Sergeants of the British Columbia Regiment (Duke of Connaught's Own) carry in the unit's guidon during the unit's 125th anniversary parade and Freedom of the City reaffirmation at Vancouver City Hall, October 11, 2008.

== Recognition ==
On 10 November 1983 Canada Post issued 'The Royal Canadian Regiment, The British Columbia Regiment' as part of the Canadian Forces, Regiments, 1883–1983 series. The stamps were designed by Ralph Tibbles, based on a painting by William Southern. The 32¢ stamps are perforated 13.5 x 13 and were printed by Canadian Bank Note Company, Limited. The Freedom of the City was exercised by the British Columbia Regiment in Vancouver, British Columbia on October 13, 2008.

== Alliances ==
- United Kingdom — The Rifles

== Battle honours ==
The guidon of The BCR.

Battle honours in small capitals are for large operations and campaigns and those in lowercase are for more specific battles. Bold type indicates honours emblazoned on the regimental guidon. The regiment formerly held the battle honour Pursuit to Mons, but this honour cannot be perpetuated if a regiment is entitled to the honour Valenciennes, which was gained by the regiment upon amalgamation with the Irish Fusiliers of Canada (The Vancouver Regiment) in 2002.

South African War
South Africa, 1899–1900
First World War
- **Ypres, 1915, '17**
- Gravenstafel
- St. Julien
- **Festubert, 1915**
- Mount Sorrel
- **Somme, 1916, '18**
- Flers–Courcelette
- Thiepval
- Ancre Heights
- Ancre, 1916
- Arras, 1917, '18
- **Vimy, 1917**
- Arleux
- Hill 70
- **Passchendaele**
- **Amiens**
- Scarpe, 1917, '18
- **Drocourt–Quéant**
- **Hindenburg Line**
- **Canal du Nord**
- Cambrai, 1918
- Valenciennes
- **France and Flanders, 1915–18**
Second World War
- **Falaise**
- Falaise Road
- The Laison
- **Chambois**
- The Scheldt
- **The Lower Maas**
- **The Rhineland**
- **The Hochwald**
- **Veen**
- **Twente Canal**
- **Küsten Canal**
- **Bad Zwischenahn**
- **North-West Europe, 1944–1945**
South-West Asia
Afghanistan

== Bands ==
The regiment is also home to two volunteer bands. The British Columbia Regiment Band is a brass and reed band that performs at regimental mess dinners and events, as well as public performances at community events. The British Columbia Regiment Irish Pipes and Drums are a volunteer pipe and drum band representing the regiment. The band preserves the Irish heritage of the regiment, and the former Irish Fusiliers of Canada, which merged to become part of the British Columbia Regiment in 2002.

== Cadet Corps ==
There are several Royal Canadian Army Cadets corps spread across British Columbia that are affiliated to the British Columbia Regiment (DCO). Cadet units affiliated to the BCR (DCO) receive support and also are entitled to wear traditional regimental accoutrements on their uniforms.

Corps	Location
2290 (101 Duke of Connaught's Own Rifles) RCACC	Vancouver
2381 BCR (Irish Fusiliers) RCACC	Richmond
2781 (BCR) RCACC	Powell River
2827 (BCR) RCACC	Port Moody
3300 (BCR) RCACC	Surrey

=== Lineage chart ===
Lineage chart

1874	Seymour Bty of Garrison Arty	No. 1 Coy of Rifles, Victoria
1878	Victoria Bty of Garrison Arty
1883	BC Provisional Regt of Garrison Arty
1886	BC Bde of Garrison Arty
1893	BC Bn of Garrison Arty
1895	5th BC Bn of Garrison Arty
1895	5th "BC" Regt, CA
1896	1st Bn, 5th "BC" Regt, CA	2nd Bn, 5th "BC" Regt, CA
1899	6th Bn Rifles
1900	6th Regt "The Duke of Connaught's Own Rifles"
1910	Earl Grey's Own Rifles (Note: Independent company)
1913	11th Regt Irish Fusiliers of Canada
1914	7th Bn, CEF	29th Bn, CEF	68th Regt (Earl Grey's Own Rifles)	30th Bn, CEF
1915	62nd "Overseas" Bn, CEF	158th "Overseas" Bn, CEF	121st "Overseas" Bn, CEF	102nd "Overseas" Bn, CEF	30th Reserve Bn, CEF
1916	Absorbed by 30th Reserve Bn
1917	Absorbed by 1st Reserve Bn	Absorbed by 16th Reserve Bn	Absorbed by 1st Reserve Bn
1920	Disbanded	Disbanded	Disbanded
1920	1st Bn (7th Bn, CEF), 1st BC Regt	4th Bn (62nd Bn, CEF), (Note: Reserve) 1st BC Regt	2nd Bn (29th Bn, CEF), 1st BC Regt	5th Bn (131st Bn, CEF), 1st BC Regt	1st Bn (121st Bn, CEF), The Irish Fusiliers of Canada	1st Bn (102nd Bn, CEF), The North BC Regt	2nd Bn (30th Bn, CEF), The North BC Regt
1920	1st Bn (7th Bn, CEF), 1st BC Regt (Duke of Connaught's Own)	4th Bn (62nd Bn, CEF), 1st BC Regt (Duke of Connaught's Own)	2nd Bn (29th Bn, CEF), 1st BC Regt (Duke of Connaught's Own)	5th Bn (131st Bn, CEF), 1st BC Regt (Duke of Connaught's Own)
1921	5th Bn (158th Bn, CEF), 1st BC Regt (Duke of Connaught's Own)
1924	2nd Bn (62nd Bn, CEF), 1st BC Regt (Duke of Connaught's Own)	1st Bn (29th Bn, CEF), The Vancouver Regt	2nd Bn (158th Bn, CEF), The Vancouver Regt
1930	1st Bn (7th Bn, CEF), The BC Regt (Duke of Connaught's Own Rifles)	2nd Bn (62nd Bn, CEF), The BC Regt (Duke of Connaught's Own Rifles)
1936	Disbanded	Disbanded	Disbanded
1936	The BC Regt (Duke of Connaught's Own Rifles)	Irish Fusiliers (Vancouver Regt)	102nd (North BC) Heavy Bty, RCA
1940	The BC Regt (Duke of Connaught's Own Rifles), CASF	2nd (Reserve) Bn, The BC Regt, (Duke of Connaught's Own Rifles)
1940	1st Bn, The BC Regt (Duke of Connaught's Own Rifles), CASF	102nd (Reserve) (North BC) Heavy Bty, RCA
1941	1st Bn, Irish Fusiliers (Vancouver Regt), CASF	2nd (Reserve) Bn, Irish Fusiliers (Vancouver Regt)	102nd (North BC) Heavy Bty, RCA, CASF
1942	28th Armd Regt (The BC Regt), CAC, CASF	3rd Bn, Irish Fusiliers (Vancouver Regt), CASF	102nd Coast Bty, RCA, CASF
1943	Disbanded
1945	28th Armd Regt (The BC Regt), RCAC, CASF	Disbanded	Irish Fusiliers (Vancouver Regt)	Disbanded
1946	Disbanded	13th Armd Regt (The BC Regt), RCAC	65th Light Anti-Aircraft Regt (Irish Fusiliers), RCA	120th Coast Bty, RCA
1948	120th Heavy Anti Aircraft Bty, RCA
1949	The BC Regt (Duke of Connaught's Own) (13th Armd Regt)
1954	120th Harbour Defence Tp, RCA
1956	120th Independent Fd Bty, RCA
1958	The BC Regt (Duke of Connaught's Own) (RCAC)	Irish Fusiliers of Canada (The Vancouver Regt)
1965	Supplementary Order of Battle
1985	The BC Regt (Duke of Connaught's Own)
2002	The BC Regt (Duke of Connaught's Own)

== Order of precedence ==
Preceded by The Royal Canadian Hussars (Montreal)	The British Columbia Regiment (Duke of Connaught's Own)	Succeeded by The South Alberta Light Horse

== Books ==
- "A short history of the British Columbia regiment (13th armoured regiment, Duke of Connaught's own, Royal Canadian armoured corps). The "Dukes." (Vancouver: Regimental Headquarters, 1953)
- The Dukes - The Story of the Men Who have Served in Peace and War with the British Columbia Regiment (D.C.O.) by Douglas E. Harker (1974)
- Swift and Strong, 2011
