= Operation Howard =

WWII British Army operation (6 to 29 April 1945)

- Part of Western Front
| Date | 6 – 29 April 1945 |
| Location | near Oldenburg, western Germany |
| Result | British victory |

Belligerents
| United Kingdom | (Nazi Germany) Germany |

Commanders and leaders
| (United Kingdom) Paddy Mayne | (Nazi Germany) Wolfgang Erdmann |

Strength
| 1st Special Air Service: 180 men in 40 Jeeps | Elements of the 7th Parachute Division |

Casualties and losses
| 5 killed 19 wounded 11 captured or missing 6 jeeps lost | 200 + killed or wounded 400 captured |

Operation Howard was a British special forces operation by B and C Squadrons, 1st Special Air Service led by Paddy Mayne that took place from 6 to 29 April 1945. It was to provide reconnaissance for the Canadian 4th Armoured Division in its advance towards Oldenburg in north-western Germany. The operation was hampered by German ambushes and boggy ground in which the Jeeps found hard going. The operation succeeded in its objective but suffered a number of casualties.

The operation was notable for an action where many felt that Paddy Mayne should have won the Victoria Cross.

== Background ==
The 1st and 2nd Special Air Service had achieved considerable success with their behind the lines raiding during and after Operation Overlord – notably Operation Bulbasket, Operation Houndsworth, Operation Loyton and Operation Wallace. Following these operations both of the Special Air Service regiments were recalled to the United Kingdom. They were to regroup and refit, for the final push into Germany the following year.

As they would no longer be behind German lines, their role had changed as they would accompany the leading reconnaissance forces, in fast moving jeep columns. They were to probe and breakthrough the forward German Units to enable a rapid advance for the main party of the Army.

On the night of 23 March Operation Plunder saw the British 21st Army Group penetrate into Germany by crossing the Rhine. Three days later the SAS also crossed the river with Operation Archway supporting the airborne element of the crossing, Operation Varsity.

Another operation was planned for the SAS to provide reconnaissance for Major General Christopher Vokes's Canadian 4th Armoured Division in its advance toward Oldenburg in north-western Germany. Under the command of Lieutenant Colonel Robert 'Paddy' B. Mayne, B and C Squadrons, 1st SAS with their jeep-mounted party departed from Tilbury on 6 April and reached Nijmegen in the Netherlands the following day. Brigadier Mike Calvert commander of the SAS was at 4th Canadian Division's headquarters to meet with Mayne and discuss the operation.

== Howard ==
The forty Jeeps with 180 men in total travelled in two columns, and entered German held territory. The terrain was far from ideal as it was crisscrossed by dykes and waterways. Nevertheless the SAS troopers advanced 37 miles (60 km) in three days, sometimes going too far ahead of the supporting Canadian armour. The SAS troopers soon discovered that their Jeeps had to deal with German ambush parties, from elements of Wolfgang Erdmann's 7th Parachute Division armed with Panzerfausts, in positions facing the 4th Canadian armoured division.

=== Mayne's rescue of B Squadron ===
B Squadron led by Major Dick Bond was caught in an ambush in woodland as it approached the village of Börger. Bond was killed along with his driver Trooper Lewis – several of his men were pinned under heavy fire outside the village from a series of farm buildings. The leading patrols were thus held up, but after hearing the reports on the radio, Mayne arrived and took over a jeep, while another officer Lieutenant John Scott volunteered as rear gunner. Another trooper Billy Hull managed to find a way into one of the farm buildings opening up distracting fire which revealed the ambushers positions. Mayne meanwhile drove flat out down the road, with Scott firing the Browning and Vickers machine gun from the jeep suppressing the attackers. Mayne turned around and repeated the attack on the way back, turning again to collect the wounded from the dyke and brought them to safety. German fire began to wane so Mayne and Hull then went from house to house clearing away any opposition. By this time the Germans had withdrawn leaving the wood and farm buildings in SAS hands.

The Canadian armour which was supposed to be following on the squadrons had not caught up. Mayne decided to withdraw back to Canadian lines so that the casualties could get urgent medical attention. Three miles from the battle Mayne buried Bond and Lewis at the side of a farmhouse.

=== Further actions ===
The following day, 11 April, Mayne's force pushed on and battled past near the village of Esterwegen. They then had to move into flooded woodland which proved too difficult to work in. In addition the roads were heavily mined so the Jeeps had to go through fields which were also waterlogged. In the afternoon C squadron were heading towards the town of Friesoythe. It was heavily defended and the outskirts aggressively patrolled – several hundred paratroopers from Battalion Raabe and anti-tank guns defended the town. On the outskirts the SAS were ambushed by mortar bombs – two Jeeps were destroyed, while an eight-man patrol that had decided to go forward on foot were captured after being surrounded. The SAS meanwhile managed to wait for the 4th Canadian armoured to come up and relieve them and the Germans retreated. The Canadians then battled for Friesoythe capturing it two days later – the town was controversially razed.

Mayne had voiced concerns to Calvert that the SAS might be misused by SHAEF, and that his unit was not being used to the best advantage. On 12 April Mayne decided to merge the two squadrons into one under the command of Tony Marsh. It soon became apparent that the SAS had to change tactics. Hiding in the woods an old SAS favourite turned out to be a disadvantage.

On 29 April the SAS moved to the area in the area of Westerscheps, just West of Oldenburg. A radio message tip off that a motorised German troop convoy was approaching near to C Squadron's position near Oldenburg. The SAS set up an ambush and on observation it was more of a convoy consisting of horse drawn carts. The Vickers and Browning machine guns caused huge destruction. When the SAS returned to the site the next day the damage they had inflicted was immense – the area was covered in German corpses as well as several burnt out half tracks.

Between 3 and 4 May the city of Oldenburg was captured by the Canadians supported by the SAS. Mayne's two units went north of the city – a trooper was killed by a mine and in that time the SAS were being extra vigilant given the inevitable German surrender which took place on 5 May.

== Aftermath ==
Following the surrender Mayne was ordered to withdraw from the front and rendezvous with the other SAS squadrons at Poperinghe, on the Franco-Belgian border. The SAS then celebrated VE Day in Brussels before their departure for Ostend to England with considerable war booty.

Casualties for Howard were moderate, out of 180 men, 35 were either killed, wounded, captured or missing, approximately twenty percent of the entire force. Of the eight that had been captured on 11 April – two of them Troopers Davidson and Youngsman managed a daring escape from Stalag X-B near Sandbostel two weeks later. Six Jeeps were destroyed and several others were badly damaged.

The Canadians had reported that the SAS handed over to them around 400 prisoners, 100 of them paratroopers. German losses were heavy – some 200 plus killed or wounded. In addition the SAS had destroyed much equipment, and captured a Parachute company's payroll.

A citation, approved by Field Marshal Bernard Montgomery, commander of 21st Army Group, was issued recommending Mayne for the Victoria Cross. Mayne instead received an exceptional third bar to his Distinguished Service Order, but being denied a VC has been a source of controversy.

Within a few weeks the SAS were redeployed again under the command of Mayne to Operation Doomsday, the liberation of Norway.

== Bibliography ==
- Bradford, Roy; Dillon, Martin (1987). Rogue Warrior of the S.A.S.: Lt.Col.Paddy Blair Mayne, D.S.O. John Murray Publishers. ISBN 978-0719544309.
- Macintyre, Ben (2016). SAS Rogue Heroes. Penguin Books Limited. ISBN 9780241186640.
- Morgan, Mike (2011). Daggers Drawn The Real Heroes of the SAS & SBS. History Press. ISBN 9780752478333.
- Mortimer, Gavin (2015). The SAS in World War II. Bloomsbury. ISBN 9781472808752.
- Ross, Hamish (2011). Paddy Mayne: Lt Col Blair 'Paddy' Mayne, 1 SAS Regiment. Sutton Publishing. ISBN 9780752469652.
- Seymour, William (2005). British Special Forces The Story of Britain's Undercover Soldiers. Leo Cooper. ISBN 9781844153626.
- Wellsted, Ian (2020). With the SAS: Across the Rhine Into the Heart of Hitler's Third Reich. Pen & Sword Books Limited. ISBN 9781526745729.
- Zuehlke, Mark (2010). On To Victory: The Canadian Liberation of the Netherlands. Greystone Books. ISBN 978-1-55365-430-8.

External links

- Chant, Christopher. "Operation Howard". Codenames - Operations of World War II.
