= Razing of Friesoythe =

1945 World War II battle and war crime

- Part of the Western Allied invasion of Germany in the Western Front of the European theatre of World War II
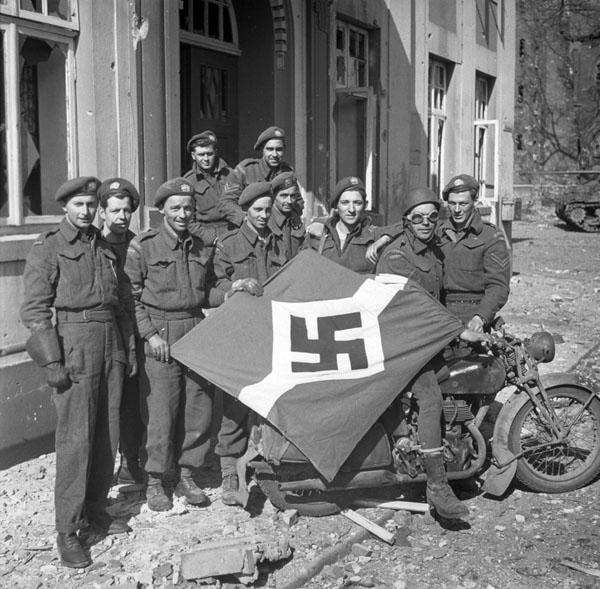
- Canadian soldiers with a Hitler Youth flag at Friesoythe on 16 April 1945
Date	13–14 April 1945
Location	Friesoythe, Lower Saxony, Germany 53°01′14″N 07°51′31″E
Result	Canadian victory: Destruction of the town

Belligerents
Canada	Germany

Commanders and leaders
Christopher Vokes; Fred Wigle †	Unknown

Units involved
Part of 4th Canadian (Armoured) Division	Part of 7th German Parachute Division

Strength
Three battalions	500 men

Casualties and losses
Unknown	Unknown
- 20 German civilians killed

Friesoythe
- Friesoythe within Lower Saxony, Germany
- Coordinates: 53°01′14″N 07°51′31″E

The razing of Friesoythe was the destruction of the town of Friesoythe in Lower Saxony on 14 April 1945, during the Western Allies' invasion of Germany towards the end of World War II in Europe. The 4th Canadian (Armoured) Division attacked the German-held town of Friesoythe, and one of its battalions, The Argyll and Sutherland Highlanders of Canada, captured it.

During the fighting, the battalion's commander was killed by a German soldier, but it was incorrectly rumoured that he had been killed by a civilian. Under this mistaken belief, the division's commander, Major-General Christopher Vokes, ordered that the town be razed in retaliation and it was substantially destroyed. Twenty German civilians died in Friesoythe and the surrounding area during the two days of fighting and its aftermath. Similar, if usually less extreme, events occurred elsewhere in Germany as the Allies advanced in the closing weeks of the war.

The rubble of the town was used to fill craters in local roads to make them passable for the division's tanks and heavy vehicles. A few days earlier, the division had destroyed the centre of Sögel in another reprisal and also used the rubble to make the roads passable. Little official notice was taken of the incident and the Canadian Army official history glosses over it. It is covered in the regimental histories of the units involved and several accounts of the campaign. Forty years later, Vokes wrote in his autobiography that he had "no great remorse over the elimination of Friesoythe."

== Context ==
=== Allied tactics ===
By September 1944, the Western Allies had reached Germany's western border, and by the end of October had captured Aachen, the first major German city to fall to them. Over the following six months they overran much of western Germany. In November the Supreme Headquarters Allied Expeditionary Force (SHAEF) publicly stated that the forces of the Western Allies would strictly adhere to international law in respect of their treatment of civilians. However, SHAEF's manual Combating the Guerrilla stated that there were circumstances where commanders could take "stern measures" against civilians as a rapid response to guerrilla attacks, although this was in breach of the Hague Conventions.

The frequency and nature of retaliatory actions differed between national contingents within the Western Allied forces. Following SHAEF's policy, United States Army forces destroyed German buildings on several occasions, sometimes entire villages, and took other measures against German civilians. French troops took a similar, if more rigorous, approach to that of the Americans. The British commanders disapproved of retaliations against civilians, and British troops carried out few reprisals.

The First Canadian Army served in the predominately British 21st Army Group, and more frequently retaliated against German civilians than the British. The commander of 4th Canadian (Armoured) Division, Major-General Christopher Vokes, believed that destroying property was the most appropriate way of responding to resistance by German civilians. The division carried out actions against German property more often than any other Canadian formation.

Soviet forces conducted retaliatory actions more frequently than their Western Allies. The Soviet Union's leadership was concerned about the threat of a German resistance movement (called Werwolf), and Soviet forces killed, raped and imprisoned large numbers of local civilians and destroyed property following guerrilla attacks.

=== Allied attitudes ===
There was frustration throughout the Allied ranks at the Germans' continued resistance in a clearly hopeless cause, anger at the casualties they inflicted when the war was widely, and correctly, perceived to be almost over, and a general feeling that severe, even ruthless, treatment of German soldiers and civilians was justified. On 15 April the British reached Bergen-Belsen concentration camp, where the inmates had been reduced to cannibalism. The historian Rick Atkinson wrote that "the revelations of April ... sparked enduring outrage".

An American officer wrote "The attitude of higher command seemed to be that these people ... should be made to feel the full significance of war and what their troops had done to other people." US general George Patton wrote in his diary "In hundreds of villages ... most of the houses are heaps of stone ... I did most of it." When a sniper fired at one of Patton's officers, he ordered several German houses to be burnt. When the commander of the US 3rd Armored Division, Maurice Rose, was killed in action 240 kilometres (150 mi) inside Germany on 30 March, several villages were razed by his irate troops, captured wounded Germans were shot on the spot and at least 45 Germans were executed after surrendering. An American artillery officer wrote home in April that "we should fire about a thousand rounds into every [German] town. Do them good". At least one British battalion refused to take Waffen-SS prisoners, shooting those who surrendered; an officer of the battalion blamed this on SS "truculence" and a British battalion commander summed up the risk-averse attitude within his unit: "At this stage of the war, no one was very keen to earn medals." A British pilot wrote: "It seemed a stupid time to die." One British corporal spoke for many when he wrote "Why don't the silly bastards give up?" Some divisions had suffered their last fatality by mid-April. The historian Max Hastings wrote "The final Anglo-American drive across Germany offered ... many foolish little battles which wasted men's lives".

=== Battle for Sögel ===
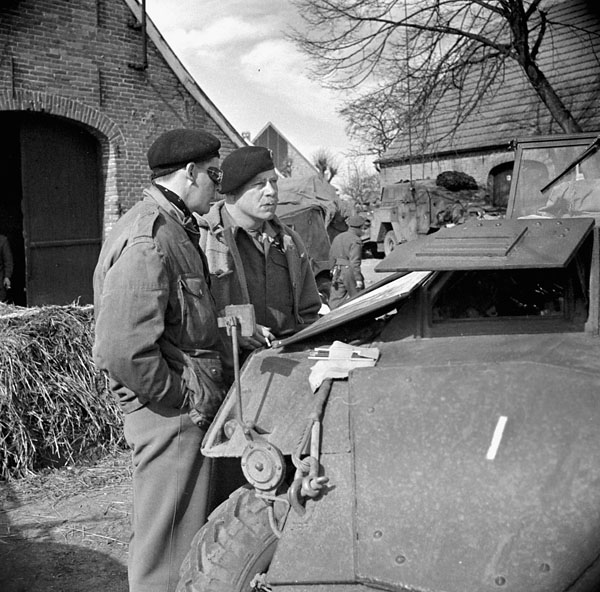
Major-General Christopher Vokes (right) with Brigadier Robert Moncel at Sögel on 10 April 1945.

In mid-March 1945 the Western Allies prepared to cross the River Rhine in Operation Plunder. The Canadian official history describes the circumstances as buoyant as it was recognized that the end of World War II in Europe was close. In early April the 4th Canadian (Armoured) Division, as part of II Canadian Corps, moved out of the eastern Netherlands in the wake of Operation Plunder's success. On 4 April, The Argyll and Sutherland Highlanders of Canada, part of the 10th Canadian Infantry Brigade, one of two brigades in the division, (Note: The other battalions in the brigade were: The Lincoln and Welland Regiment; and The Algonquin Regiment.) made an assault crossing of the Ems River and captured the town of Meppen, suffering only one casualty. German prisoners included several 17-year-old youths with less than eight weeks of military experience. The Canadians were supported by B and C squadrons SAS with Operation Howard led by Paddy Mayne, who were acting as reconnaissance.

The division advanced a further 25 km (16 mi) to Sögel, which the 1st Battalion of The Lake Superior Regiment (Motor) (Note: The Lake Superior Regiment (Motor) was part of 4th Canadian Armoured Brigade which also included: 21st Armoured Regiment (The Governor General's Foot Guards); 22nd Armoured Regiment (The Canadian Grenadier Guards); and 28th Armoured Regiment (The British Columbia Regiment).) captured on 9 April. The following day it repulsed several German counter-attacks before the town was declared cleared. Some German civilians joined the fighting and were believed to have killed several Canadian soldiers. Vokes, believing the civilians needed to be taught a lesson, ordered the destruction of the centre of the town. This was accomplished with several truckloads of dynamite. Vokes was aware that these actions violated the Hague Conventions and took care not to issue written instructions. Soldiers of the division started referring to Vokes as "The Sod of Sögel". The Canadian Army official history states:

Investigation established that German civilians had taken part in this fighting and had been responsible for the loss of Canadian lives. Accordingly, as a reprisal and a warning, several houses in the centre of Sögel were ordered destroyed by the engineers to provide rubble.

== Battle for Friesoythe ==
The Canadian advance continued across the Westphalian Lowland, reaching the outskirts of Friesoythe, a strategic crossroads, on 13 April. As it was early spring, the ground was sodden and heavy vehicles could not operate off the main roads. This made Friesoythe, 32 km (20 mi) west of Oldenburg, on the River Soeste, a potential bottleneck. If the Germans were to hold it, the bulk of the Canadians would be unable to continue their advance. Most of the population of 4,000 had evacuated to the countryside on 11–12 April. (Note: The Friesoythe Amtsgericht, or District Court, was closed on 11 April. If the District Court ceased to function on 11 April 1945, the evacuation of the bulk of the civilian population probably took place between 11 and 12 April. This was clearly a German initiative.) Several hundred paratroopers from Battalion Raabe of the German 7th Parachute Division and anti-tank guns defended the town. The paratroopers repelled an attack by the Lake Superior Regiment, which suffered several killed and wounded; German casualties are unknown.

Vokes ordered the resumption of the attack by the 1st Battalion, The Argyll and Sutherland Highlanders (Princess Louise's), commanded by Lieutenant-Colonel Frederick Wigle. The Argylls conducted a flanking night march and launched a dawn assault on 14 April. The attack met only scattered resistance from a disorganized garrison, and the Argylls secured the town by 10:30. During the confused fighting, approximately 50 German soldiers caught Wigle's tactical headquarters by surprise at around 08:30. A firefight broke out, resulting in the death of Wigle and several other soldiers. A rumour circulated that a local civilian had shot Wigle.

=== Destruction of Friesoythe ===
Vokes was furious when he heard of Wigle's death. He wrote in his autobiography that "a first-rate officer of mine, for whom I had a special regard and affection, and in whom I had a particular professional interest because of his talent for command, was killed. Not merely killed, it was reported to me, but sniped in the back". Vokes wrote, "I summoned my GSO1... 'Mac,' I roared at him, 'I'm going to raze that goddam town. Tell 'em we're going to level the fucking place. Get the people the hell out of their houses first.'" Vokes's GSO1 (head of the operations staff), Lieutenant-Colonel Mackenzie Robinson, obeyed but convinced him to not put this order in writing or issue a proclamation to the local civilians. Hastings writes that the earlier incident at Sögel contributed to Vokes's fury.

The Argylls had spontaneously begun to burn Friesoythe in reprisal for the death of their commander. After Vokes had issued his order, the town was systematically set on fire with flamethrowers mounted on Wasp Carriers. In the side streets, soldiers threw petrol containers into buildings and ignited them with phosphorus grenades. The attack continued for over eight hours and Friesoythe was almost totally destroyed. As the commanding officer of the 1st Battalion, The Algonquin Regiment, later wrote, "the raging Highlanders cleared the remainder of that town as no town has been cleared for centuries, we venture to say". The war diary of the 4th Canadian Armoured Brigade records, "when darkness fell Friesoythe was a reasonable facsimile of Dante's Inferno".

The Canadian official history states that Friesoythe "was set on fire in a mistaken reprisal". The rubble was used to reinforce the local roads for the division's tanks and heavy transport, which had been unable to move up due to the main roads near the town being badly cratered, and the smaller roads being inadequate to stand their weight.

=== Civilian casualties and damage ===
During the fighting around Friesoythe and its aftermath, ten civilians from the town and another ten from the surrounding villages were killed. It was reported that civilians were forcibly dragged out of their homes before their houses were destroyed. Additionally, there were accounts of civilians lying dead in the streets. According to one German assessment, 85–90 per cent of the town was destroyed during the reprisal. The Brockhaus Enzyklopädie estimates the destruction to have been as high as 90 per cent. The town's website records that of 381 houses in the town proper, 231 were destroyed and another 30 badly damaged. A few days later, a Canadian nurse wrote home that the convent on the edge of town was the only building left standing. In the suburb of Altenoythe, 120 houses and 110 other buildings were destroyed. In 2010, the author Mark Zuehlke suggested that, "Not all of Friesoythe was burnt, but its centre was destroyed".

== Aftermath ==
You should know our soldiers were kind to the children of our enemies, and kind to those in adversity. And they were, on the whole, great ambassadors for Canada.

— Major-General Christopher Vokes in his autobiography

The Argylls' war diary made no mention of their afternoon's activity, noting in passing that "many fires were raging". There is no record of the deliberate destruction at division, corps or army level. The war diary of the division's 8th Anti-Aircraft Regiment records "the Argylls were attacked in that town yesterday by German forces assisted by civilians and today the whole town is being systematically razed. A stern atonement ..." The 1st Battalion, The Argyll and Sutherland Highlanders (Princess Louise's) were awarded the battle honour "Friesoythe", as were the 1st Battalion, The Lake Superior Regiment (Motor) and the 1st Battalion, The Lincoln and Welland Regiment.

On 16 April The Lincoln and Welland Regiment attacked Garrel, 16 km (10 miles) south-east of Friesoythe. After a German act of perfidy – the mayor surrendered the town but the first tank to enter was destroyed by a Panzerfaust – the battalion commander, Wigle's brother-in-law, ordered that "every building which did not show a white flag be fired". Before it could be carried out, the order was countermanded and the village was spared. A Canadian force was also authorized to burn down the village of Mittelsten Thüle following what the historian Perry Briddiscombe calls "an unnamed transgression". They were talked out of this by a Canadian engineer unit as Mittelsten Thüle's civilians were running an army sawmill.

=== Post-war ===
In early 1946 Vokes heard an appeal against the death sentence of Kurt Meyer, a convicted German war criminal. Referring to his discussions about this Vokes said to the Canadian High Commissioner in London, "I told them of Sögel and Friesoythe and of the prisoners and civilians that my troops had killed in Italy and Northwest Europe". Vokes commuted the sentence to life imprisonment saying, "There isn't a general or colonel on the Allied side that I know of who hasn't said, 'Well, this time we don't want any prisoners'".

The Canadian Army official historian, Colonel Charles Stacey, visited Friesoythe on 15 April. He wrote in the Canadian Army official history, which was published in 1960, that "there is no record of how this [destruction] came about". Responding to this, the historian Mark Zuehlke wrote that there were records of the events in the war diaries of several units, but that he did not believe Stacey's vagueness was an attempt at a cover-up. In his 1982 memoirs Stacey expanded upon the official history to comment that the only time he saw what could be considered a war crime committed by Canadian soldiers (Note: The 1907 Convention Respecting the Laws and Customs of War on Land (Hague IV), Article 23, prohibits acts that "destroy or seize the enemy's property, unless such destruction or seizure be imperatively demanded by the necessities of war.") was when

... at Friesoythe, the Argyll and Sutherland Highlanders of Canada ... lost their popular commanding officer ... as a result a great part of the town of Friesoythe was set on fire in a mistaken reprisal. This unfortunate episode only came to my notice and thus got into the pages of history because I was in Friesoythe at the time and saw people being turned out of their houses and the houses burned. How painfully easy it is for the business of "reprisals" to get out of hand!

Vokes commented in his autobiography, written forty years after the event, that he had "[a] feeling of no great remorse over the elimination of Friesoythe. Be that as it may." This position may have been motivated by a continued belief that the retaliatory actions were justified.

== See also ==
- Allied war crimes during World War II
- Collective punishment
- List of war crimes

== Notes, citations and sources ==
=== Sources ===
- Ambrose, Stephen E. (1997). Citizen Soldiers: The U.S. Army from the Normandy Beaches to the Bulge to the Surrender of Germany. New York: Simon & Schuster. ISBN 978-0-684-81525-1.
- Argyll and Sutherland Highlanders of Canada War Diary. Ottawa, ON: Library and Archives Canada. pp. 10–11. RG 24, v. 15,005.
- The Associated Press (20 April 1945). "2 German Towns Razed; Civilians Fired on Allies". Vol. 94, no. 31863. p. 4.
- Atkinson, Rick (2015). The Guns at Last Light. Great Britain: Abacus. ISBN 978-0-349-14048-3.
- Briddiscombe, Perry (1998). Werwolf! : The History of the National Socialist Guerrilla Movement, 1944–1946. Toronto: University of Toronto Press. ISBN 978-0-8020-0862-6.
- Die Enzyklopädie, 20. Aufl. V. 7. Leipzig: Brockhaus. 1996.
- Brode, Patrick (1997). Casual Slaughters and Accidental Judgements: Canadian War Crimes Prosecutions, 1944–1948. Toronto; Buffalo: For Osgoode Society for Canadian Legal History by University of Toronto Press. ISBN 978-0-8020-4204-0.
- The Insignia and Linages of the Canadian Forces (PDF). Vol. 3, Part Two: Infantry Regiments. Canadian Forces Heritage Publication. 15 January 2010. A-DH-267-000/AF-003. Archived (PDF) from the original on 6 December 2017.
- "4th Canadian (Armoured) Division". Canadian Soldier.
- Cassidy, G. L. (1948). Warpath; the Story of the Algonquin Regiment, 1939–1945. Toronto: Ryerson Press. OCLC 937425850.
- Cloppenburg, Ferdinand (2003). Die Stadt Friesoythe im zwanzigsten Jahrhundert [The Town of Friesoythe in the Twentieth Century)] (in German). Friesoythe: Schepers. ISBN 978-3-00-012759-5.
- Foster, Tony (2000) [Published by Metheun 1986]. Meeting of Generals (iUniverse ed.). San Jose; New York: Authors Choice Press. ISBN 978-0-595-13750-3.
- Fraser, Robert L. (1996). Black Yesterdays; the Argylls' War. Hamilton: Argyll Regimental Foundation. ISBN 978-0-9681380-0-7.
- Friesoythe. "Chronik – 1930 bis 1948 | Stadt Friesoythe" (in German). Archived from the original on 11 September 2018.
- Granatstein, J.L. (May–June 2010). "Legion Magazine" (PDF). p. 16. Archived from the original (PDF) on 27 January 2018.
- Hastings, Max (2004). Armageddon: the Battle for Germany 1944–45. London: Macmillan Publishers. ISBN 978-0-333-90836-5.
- Hibbert, Joyce (1985). Fragments of War: Stories from Survivors of World War II. Toronto: Dundurn Press. ISBN 978-0-919670-95-2.
- "Convention (IV) respecting the Laws and Customs of War on Land and its annex: Regulations concerning the Laws and Customs of War on Land". International Committee of the Red Cross. Archived from the original on 27 January 2018.
- Lincoln and Welland Regiment War Diary, April 1945. Ottawa, ON: Library and Archives Canada. RG24/8.
- Marsh, James H. (2015) [2013]. "One More River to Cross: The Canadians in Holland". The Canadian Encyclopedia. Archived from the original on 29 March 2018.
- Morton, Desmond (2016) [2008]. "Christopher Vokes". The Canadian Encyclopedia.
- Rogers, R. L. (1989). History of The Lincoln and Welland Regiment. Ottawa: Lincoln and Welland Regiment, Canadian Army. OCLC 13090416.
- Seymour, William (2005). British Special Forces The Story of Britain's Undercover Soldiers. Leo Cooper. ISBN 9781844153626.
- Sirluck, E. (14 April 1945). Intelligence Report, War Diary, General Staff, 4th Canadian Armoured Division, 1 April 1945 – 30 April 1945. Appendix 38. Library and Archives Canada. RG 24, vol. no. 13794.
- Stacey, Charles Perry (1960). The Victory Campaign: The Operations in North-west Europe 1944–45 (PDF). Official History of the Canadian Army in the Second World War. Vol. III. Ottawa: Queen's Printer. OCLC 317352926.
- Stacey, Charles Perry (1982). A Date With History. Ottawa: Deneau. ISBN 978-0-88879-086-6.
- Vokes, Chris (1985). Vokes: My Story. Ottawa: Gallery Books. ISBN 978-0-9692109-0-0.
- Whiting, Charles (2007). The British Liberation Army, 1944-1945. Spellmount. pp. 165–166. ISBN 978-1862274402.
- Williams, Jeffery (1988). The Long Left Flank: The Hard Fought Way to the Reich, 1944–1945. Toronto: Stoddart. ISBN 978-0-7737-2194-4. OCLC 25747884.
- Zuehlke, Mark (2010). On to Victory: The Canadian Liberation of the Netherlands. Vancouver: Greystone Books. ISBN 978-1-55365-430-8.
