= Moerbrugge =

Coordinates: 51°10′N 3°16′E

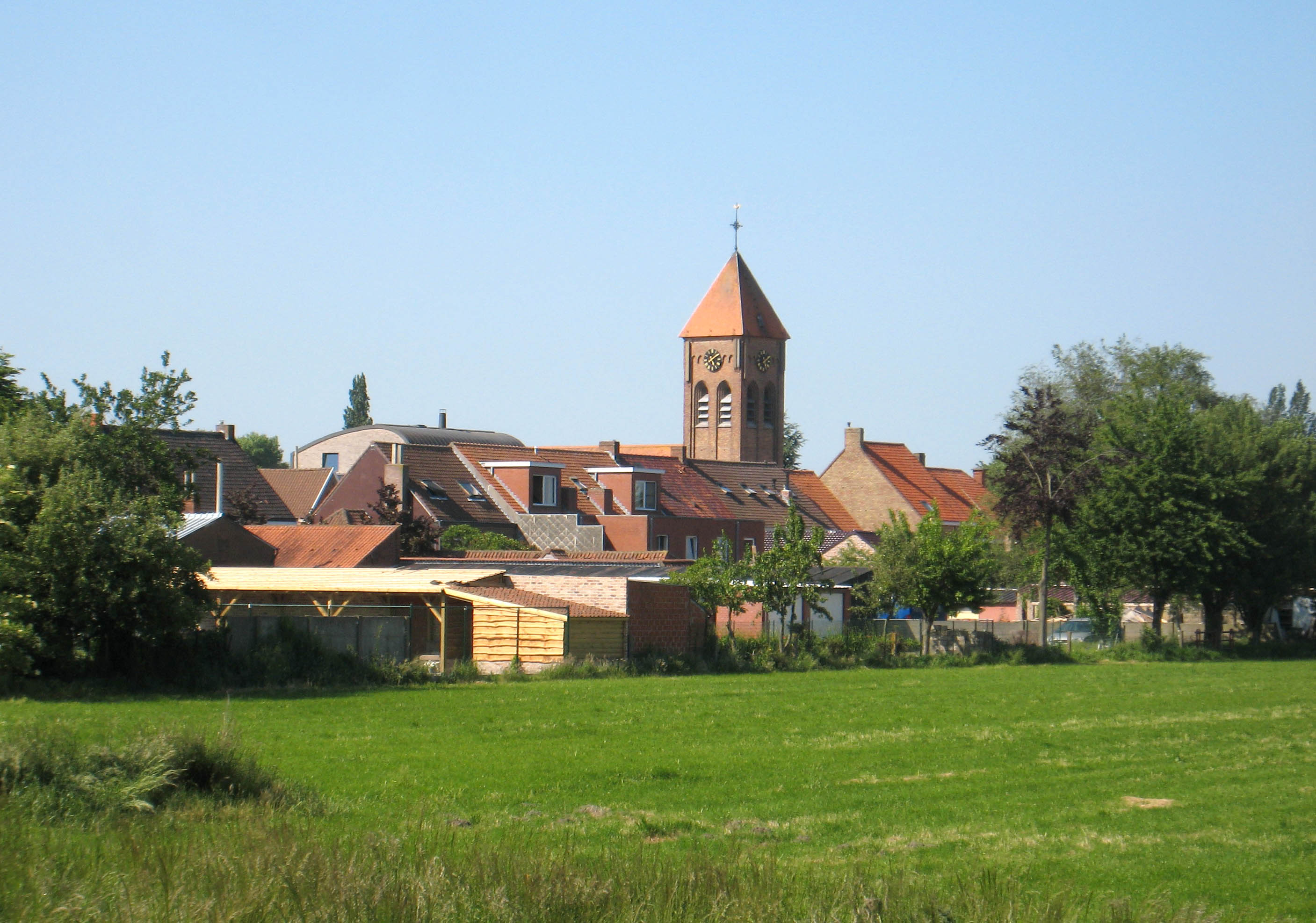
Moerbrugge

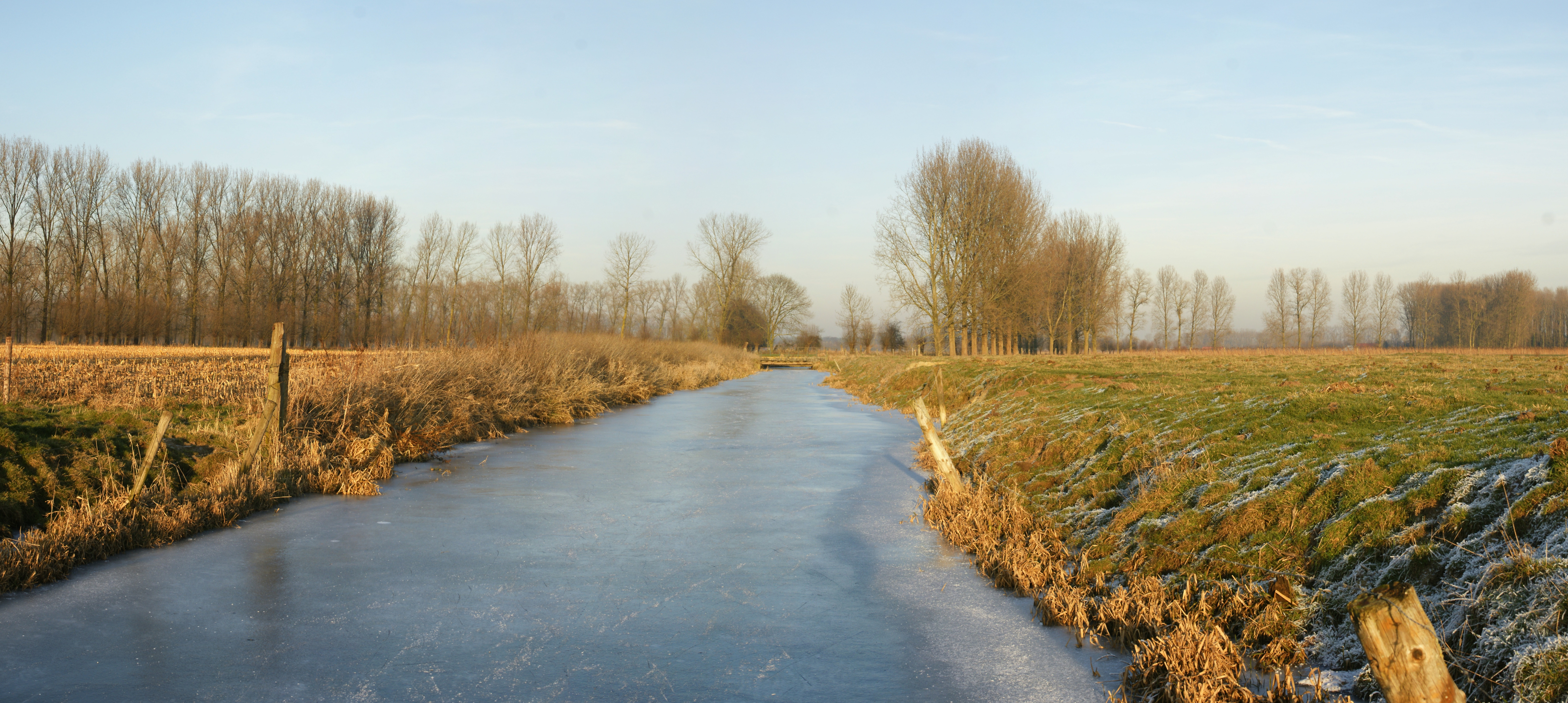
Winter in the Assebroekse Meersen.

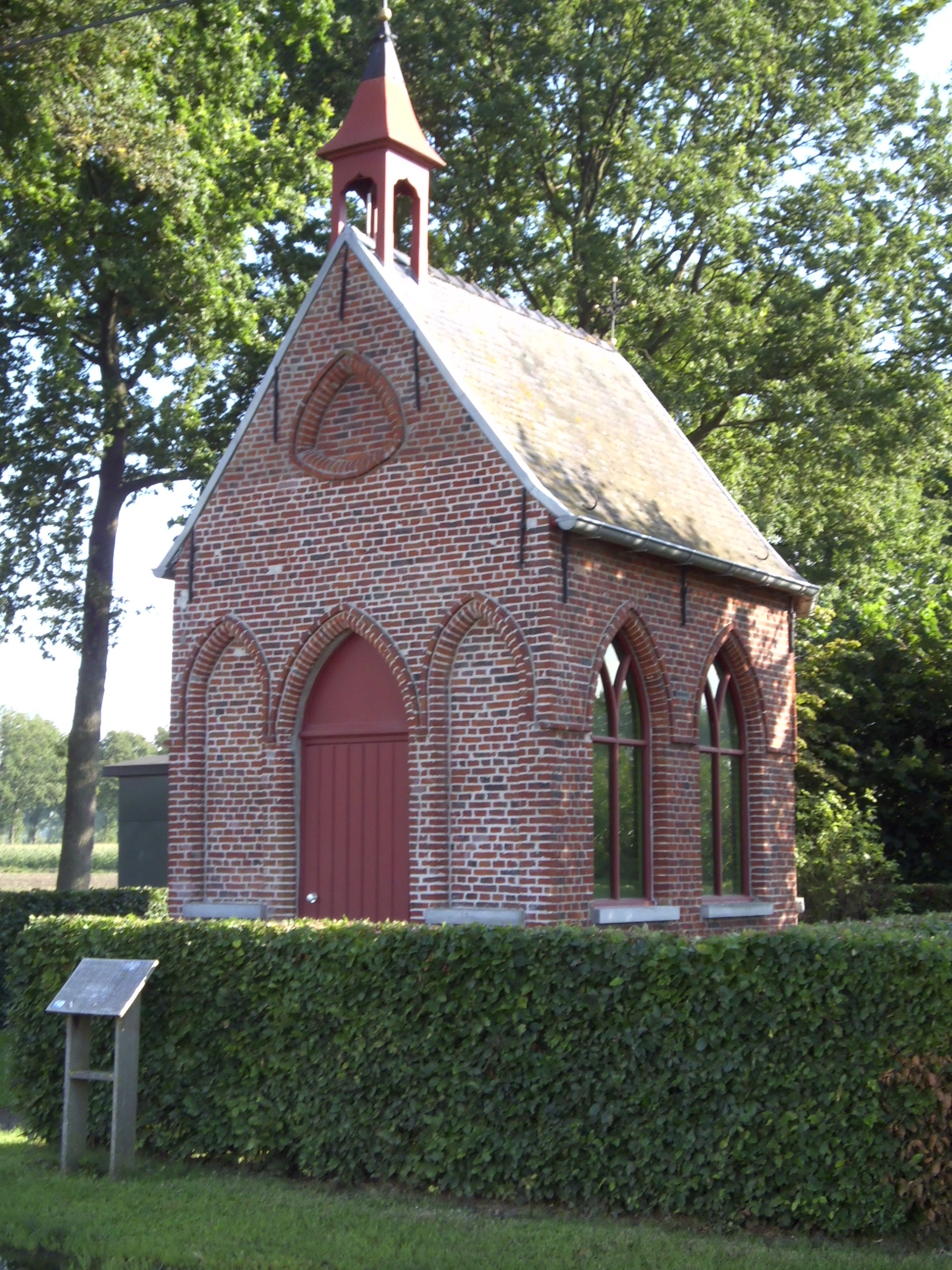
Veldkapel or Beverhoutsveldkapel near Moerbrugge (Veldstraat - Beverhoutstraat).

Moerbrugge is a hamlet in Oostkamp, West Flanders, Belgium. During the Allied advance through Belgium in September 1944, the 10th Canadian Infantry Brigade of the Canadian 4th Armoured Division began crossing the Ghent–Bruges Canal at Moerbrugge on 7 September; engineers had bridged the canal and tanks of the South Alberta Regiment crossed by 9 September.

== See also ==
- Battle of Moerbrugge
