= Battle of Moerbrugge =

1944 battle of WW2 in Belgium

- Part of the Liberation of Belgium
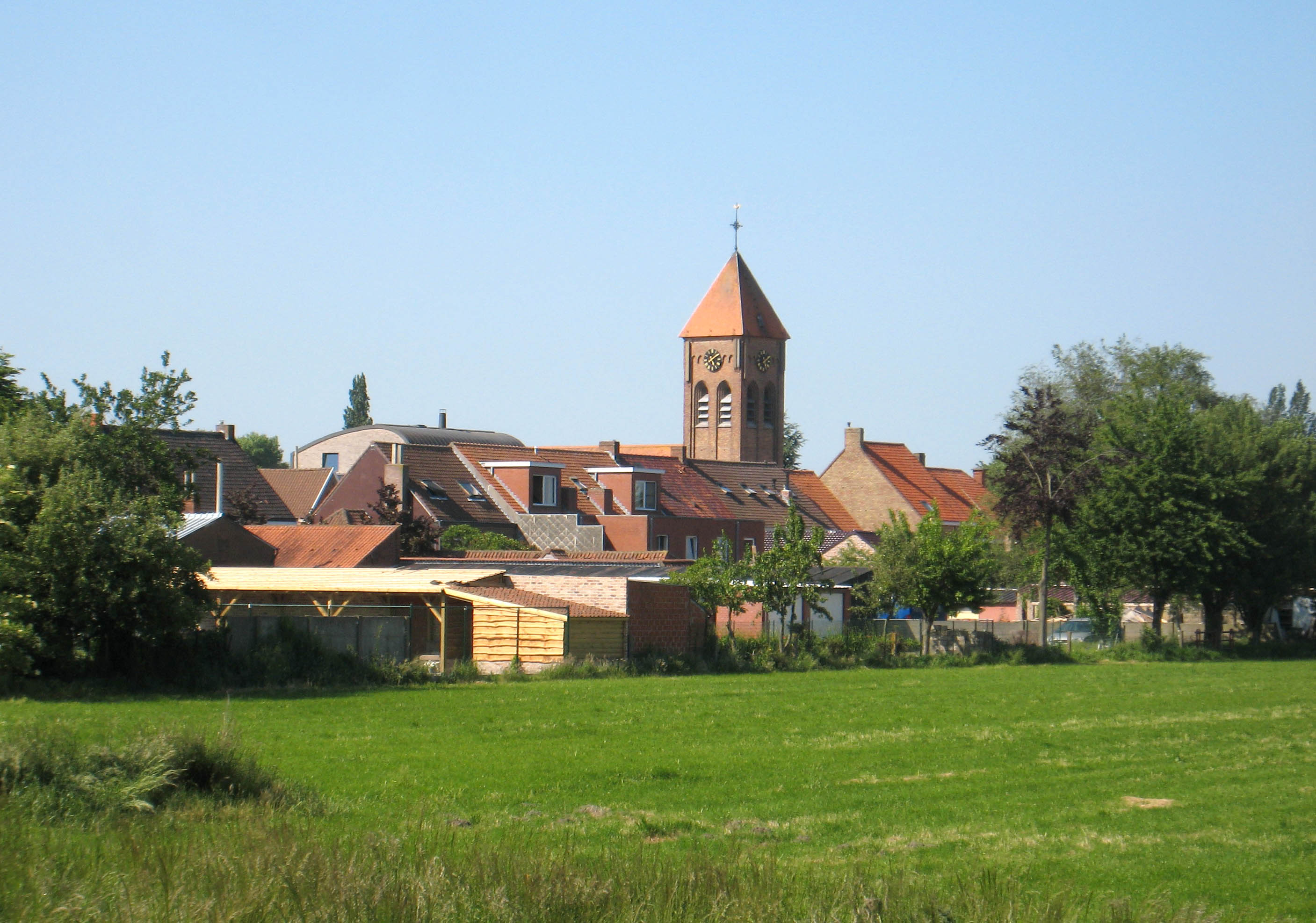
- Modern day Moerbrugge
Date	8–10 September 1944
Location	Moerbrugge, Belgium
Result	Allied victory

Belligerents
Canada	Germany

Commanders and leaders
J. David Stewart	Knut Eberding

Strength
10th Canadian Infantry Brigade	Elements of 64th Infantry Division

Casualties and losses
250 killed wounded or captured	700 killed, wounded or captured 20 AA guns captured 8 mortars captured

The Battle of Moerbrugge was a three-day battle during the Liberation of Belgium.

The 10th Canadian Infantry Brigade was tasked to cross the Ghent Canal about five kilometers south of Bruges at the small village of Oostkamp in early September 1944. Directly across the canal from Oostkamp was another small village named Moerbrugge. The canal is about 20 metres wide and very deep. Opposition was not expected so only one battalion was chosen for the crossing: the Argyll and Sutherland Highlanders of Canada (Princess Louise's), the Argylls.

Two batteries of the 15th Field Regiment, RCA were placed in support but due to the rapid advance of the allied armies, supply lines were hundreds of miles long and not much ammunition was available for the guns. As a result, no preparatory fire was laid on. Fire would be provided on an "as required" basis.

The South Alberta Regiment (SARs) would place its tanks on the friendly side of the canal at either side of the crossing point and hold the flanks of the crossing with their fire along with the Vickers machine guns of The New Brunswick Rangers. The 3-inch mortars of the Argylls and the 4.2-inch mortars of the Rangers were in support but as low on ammunition as the artillery.

Finally, "A" Company of the Argylls, the Argyll scout platoon and one squadron of the SARs were moved to a point north of the crossing along the canal to provide a diversion and to test German defences in that area.

At that time, the Argyll Commanding Officer, Lieutenant Colonel Dave Stewart, was away from the unit which was left under command of the Deputy Commanding Officer, Major B. Stockloser. Major Stockloser ordered "B", "C", and "D" companies to cross the canal but had not arranged for assault boats, stating that the operation would be "a crossing of opportunity".

== Crossing ==
At 15:30 on 8 September 1944, the three assault companies moved to Oostkamp. Luckily, the "opportunity" to which Major Stockloser had alluded came about in the form of two civilian boats which were discovered by Major Mackenzie, Officer Commanding "D" Company. These boats would eventually ferry all three companies across the canal. Some boats sank during the crossing and heavily laden soldiers were drowned. At 17:30, "D" Company started to cross and soon the Germans responded with 88 mm and mortar fire. Casualties started to mount even before the companies reached the other side. In two hours, "C" Coy would drop in strength from 63 men to just 46. By midnight, all three companies were across and holding a narrow bridgehead on the far side.

Major Mackenzie was wounded and "D" Company was driven back to the canal by German counter-attacks. "C" Company was cut off from the "B" and "D" Companies by German infiltration. The day ended with 5 Argylls killed and 26 wounded.

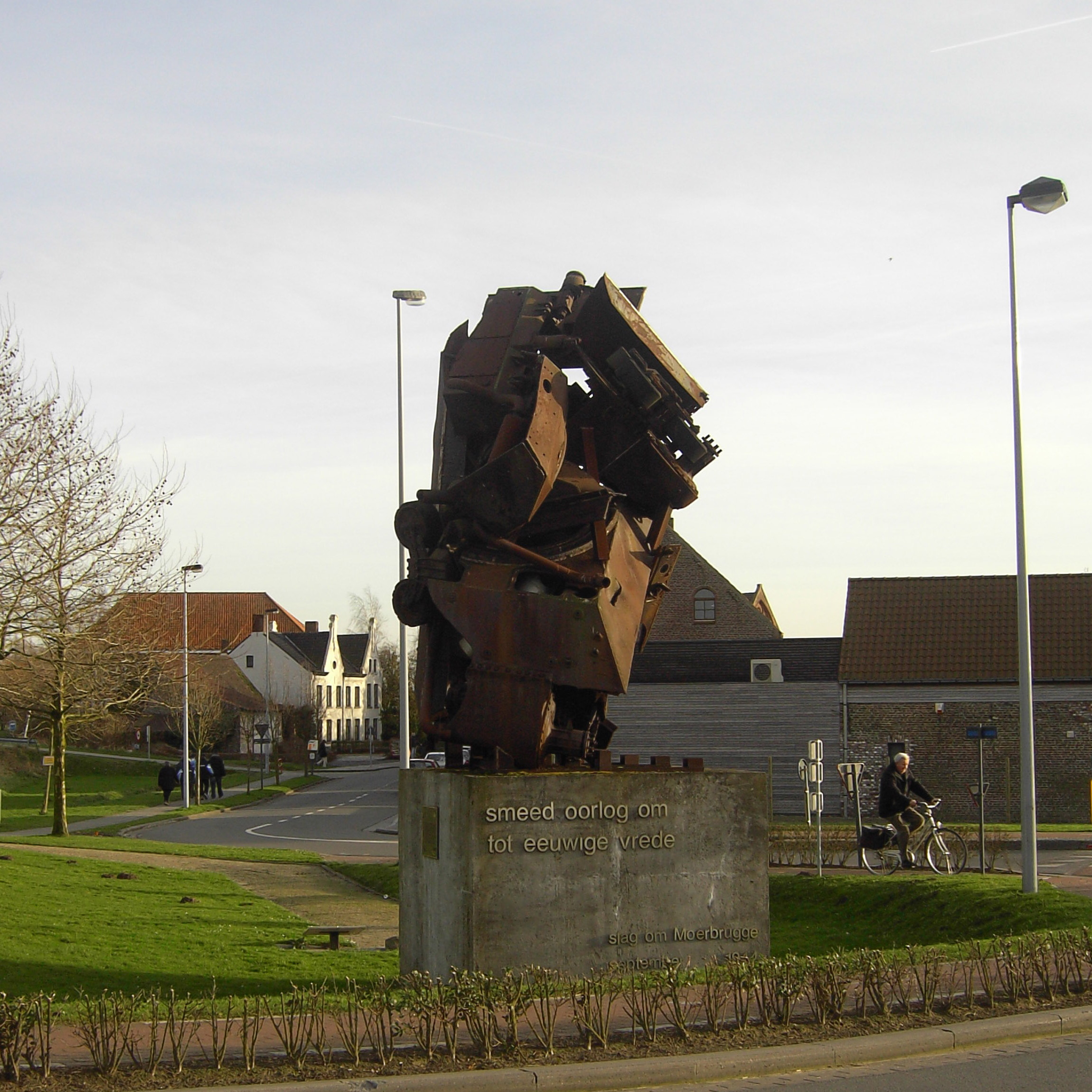
Moerbrugge - Monument

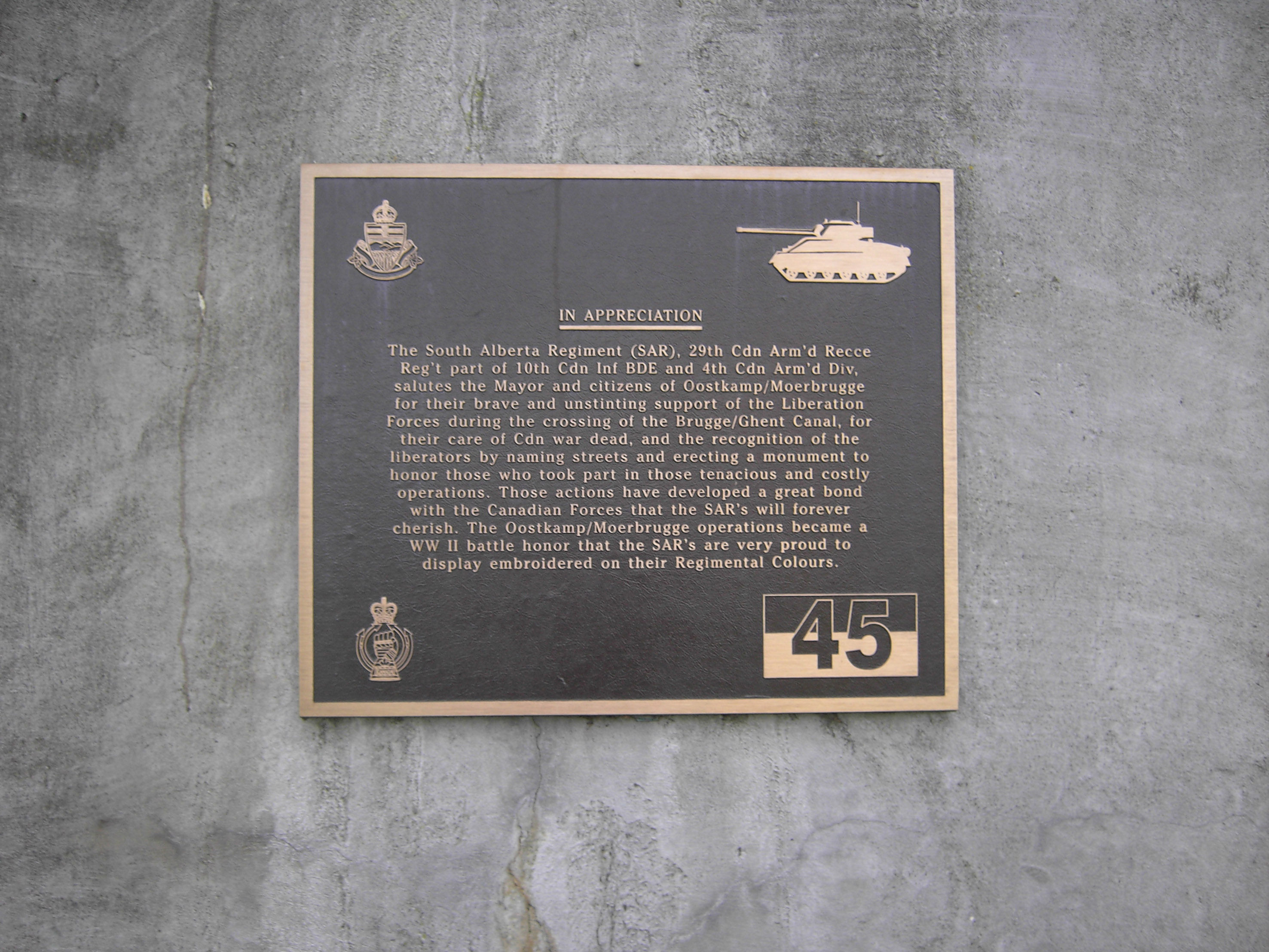
Moerbrugge - South Alberta Regiment

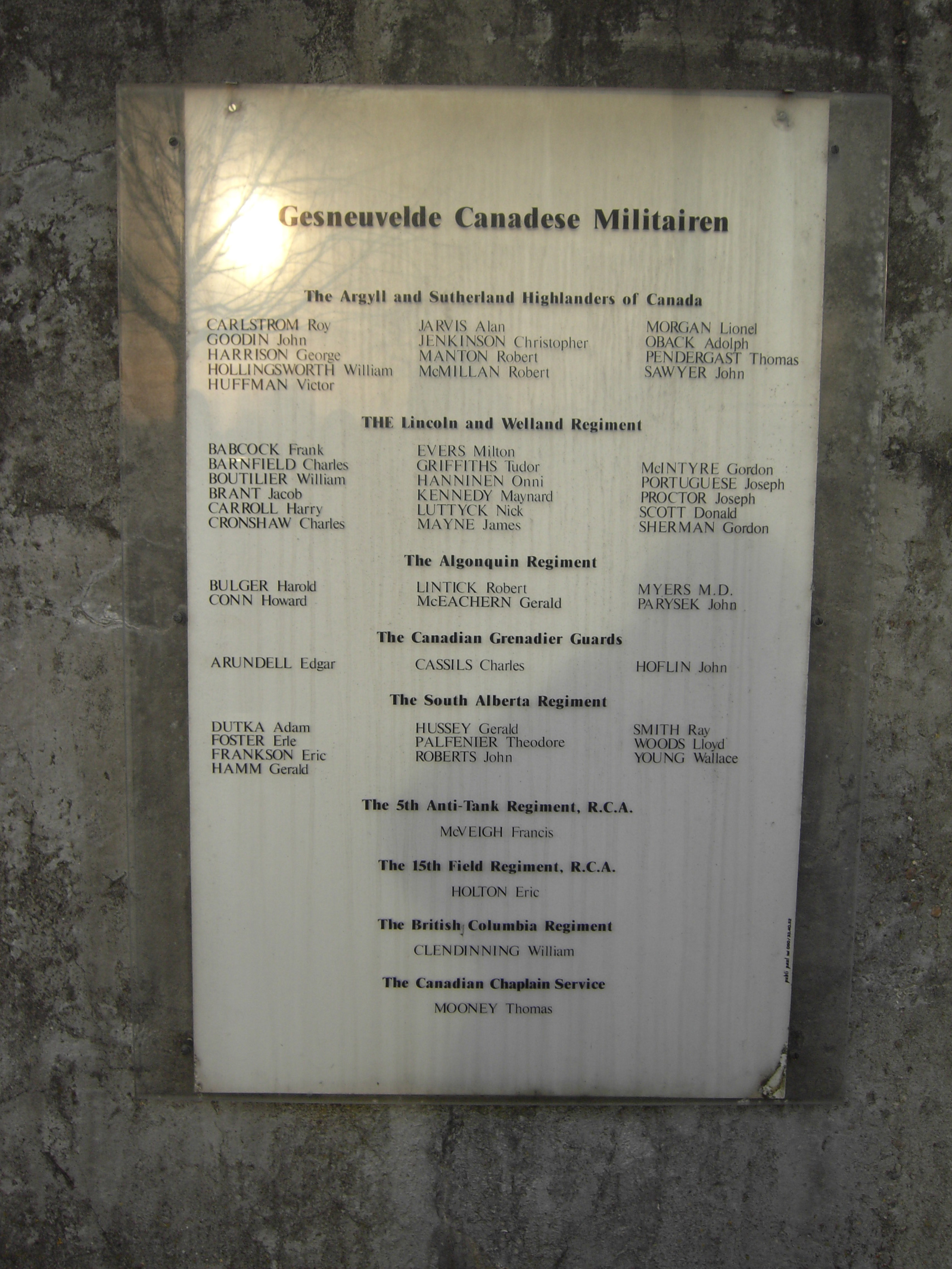
Moerbrugge - Names of Canadian soldiers

== Holding action ==
The 9 September 1944 would see The Lincoln and Welland Regiment cross the canal and take up a position on the right flank of the Argylls. The situation would remain serious throughout the day, with several German counter-attacks launched against the bridgehead. Cpl. James Alexander of "A" Company would be awarded the Military Medal for his actions that day. The citation reads in part, "Opposition was particularly fierce, with the enemy artillery and mortar fire as well as a large volume of small arms fire from well dug-in positions. Cpl. Alexander was wounded at about 10:00 a.m. and after having his wounds dressed, requested and was allowed to return to his company." "An enemy counter-attack rapidly and Cpl. Alexander was wounded by a 20mm shell which struck a wall close by his head and knocked him down. Ignoring both the wound of the morning and the one he had just received Cpl Alexander rallied his section, seized a Bren gun and propping himself against a wall, stood-up fully exposed to fire and the enemy and to cover the movement of a party of his men, which had become detached from the remainder."

"C" Company was in a particularly difficult position being cut off from the other companies. In addition, their radios failed leaving them out of contact with all support. However, the company hung on and repulsed all counter-attacks. Company Sergeant Major George Mitchell deserves much credit for holding the defence together. He personally led a party that brought up much needed supplies and ammunition. After the battle, he would be awarded the Distinguished Conduct Medal.

Lance Corporal Lorne A. Webb and Private Arthur Bridge held their position in an upstairs window and returned fire with their Bren gun despite German machine gun and 20 mm cannon fire directed at them, some of which passed through the window opening but missed hitting them. As ammunition ran low, the riflemen loaded their remaining rounds into Bren magazines and kept feeding them to the Bren gunners. At one point, Webb inflicted 15 to 20 casualties on the attacking Germans in the matter of a few minutes. Three heavy counter-attacks on "C" Company were driven off with extremely heavy losses visited upon the Germans. However, one Argyll platoon was overrun by sheer weight of numbers and the platoon commander killed.

Because of the incessant German shelling and mortaring of the crossing site, the engineers found it impossible to construct a Bailey bridge so supplies and ammunition had to be ferried across the canal in boats. Slowly, more artillery ammunition was finding its way forward to the Canadian guns and supporting fire increased. The SARs and New Brunswick Rangers continued to hold the flanks of the assault force.

At 14:00, "A" Company and the Scout Platoon were recalled from their diversionary task and moved to a supporting position on the friendly side of the crossing. It was feared that the bridgehead might collapse and the six Argyll and Lincoln and Welland companies in Moerbrugge might have to be evacuated.

At 15:00, Lieutenant Colonel Stewart returned to the unit. The brigade commander placed him in charge of the crossing with the Lincoln and Welland under command. He immediately set about reorganising the positions on the bridgehead.

At 19:00, the Germans blanketed both sides of the crossing with a hail storm of mortar fire as a prelude to their final counter-attack. However, their attempt was thwarted and the counter-attack was beaten back. Due to the fire, the engineers had to halt bridge construction yet again. However, by midnight, Canadian counter battery fire finally suppressed the German shelling of the bridge site. The Argylls lost 7 killed, 22 wounded and 12 captured during the day.

By the morning of the 10 September 1944, the engineers finally completed the bridge. SAR tanks moved across and established contact with the cut off "C" Company. About 150 German prisoners were sent back over the new bridge.

== Aftermath ==
An estimated 700 Germans were killed, wounded or captured during the Moerbrugge battle. Twenty of their 20 mm FLAK (anti aircraft) cannons were captured along with six 81 mm mortars. German shelling and mortaring would continue sporadically all day but ownership of the crossing site was no longer an issue. One Argyll died and two were wounded on the 10th.
