= Walter Hagen (aviator) =

German Military Pilot

- Born: 16 March 1897; Kiel, German Empire
- Died: 24 November 1963 (aged 66)
- Military career
- Allegiance: Nazi Germany
- Branch: Luftwaffe
- Rank: Generalmajor
- Commands: StG 1, Fliegerführer "Nord-Balkan", 17. Flieger-Division
- Conflicts: World War II
- Awards: Knight's Cross of the Iron Cross with Oak Leaves

Walter Adolf Christian Hagen (16 March 1897 – 24 November 1963) was a pilot in the Luftwaffe during World War II and a recipient of the Knight's Cross of the Iron Cross with Oak Leaves of Nazi Germany.

== Awards ==
- Clasp to the Iron Cross (1939) 2nd Class (17 September 1939) & 1st Class (9 June 1940)
- Knight's Cross of the Iron Cross with Oak Leaves
  - Knight's Cross on 21 July 1940 as "Major" and "Gruppenkommandeur" of the III./Sturzkampfgeschwader 1
  - Oak Leaves on 17 February 1942 as Oberstleutnant and Geschwaderkommodore of Sturzkampfgeschwader 1

Military offices
Preceded by Oberstleutnant Eberhard Baier	Geschwaderkommodore of Sturzkampfgeschwader 1; 21 June 1940 – 15 March 1943	Succeeded by Oberstleutnant Gustav Preßler
Preceded by General der Flieger Hans Seidemann	Fliegerführer Afrika; 1 February 1943 – February 1943	Succeeded by —
Preceded by Generalleutnant Wolfgang Erdmann	Fliegerführer Kroatien; Fliegerführer Nordbalkan; 30 April 1944 – 1 February 1945	Succeeded by: 17. Flieger-Division
