= 10th Canadian Infantry Brigade =

Brigade of the Canadian Army

10th Canadian Brigade 10th Canadian Infantry Brigade
- 4th Canadian (Armoured) Division Formation Patch
- Active: 1916–1944
- Country: Canada
- Branch: Canadian Army
- Type: Infantry
- Size: Brigade
- Part of: 4th Canadian Division
- Engagements: World War I: Vimy Ridge; 2nd Ypres; Passchendaele; Battle of Somme; World War II: Battle of Normandy; Battle of the Scheldt; Battle of Moerbrugge
- Battle honours: Capture of Hill 145 in Vimy Ridge Capture of the Pimple, Battle of Vimy Ridge

Commanders
- Notable commanders: Norman Elliot Rodger

The 10th Canadian Infantry Brigade was a formation of the Canadian Army in both World War I and World War II. The brigade fought on the Western Front during World War I, and in Normandy and north-west Europe during World War II. It formed part of the 4th Canadian Division.

== History ==
=== World War I ===
The 10th Brigade was part of the Canadian Expeditionary Force raised during the First World War. It was formed in England in April 1916. It participated in every major Canadian engagement from the Somme (from August 1916) to the last 100 days (1918). The 10th Canadian Infantry Brigade consisted of four battalions, and formed part of the 4th Division. The battalions were the 44th Battalion, the 46th Battalion, the 47th Battalion and the 50th Battalion.

=== World War II ===
The 10th Canadian Infantry Brigade was first assembled at Nanaimo, British Columbia in October 1940, although Nanaimo was not established as its headquarters until February 1941. In April 1941 it was moved east to the Niagara area, exchanging places with the 13th Canadian Infantry Brigade. During World War II, it was part of the Canadian 4th Armoured Division, alongside the 4th Canadian Armoured Brigade.

The brigade consisted of the following units:

- 1st Battalion, The Lincoln and Welland Regiment
- 1st Battalion, The Algonquin Regiment
- 1st Battalion, The Argyll and Sutherland Highlanders of Canada (Princess Louise's)
- 10th Infantry Brigade Ground Defence Platoon (Lorne Scots)
- 10th Canadian Infantry Brigade Support Group (The New Brunswick Rangers) (November 1943–February 1944)
- 10th Independent Machine Gun Company (The New Brunswick Rangers) (February 1944–February 1946)

==== Normandy ====
As part of the 4th Armoured Division, the 10th Brigade arrived in Normandy at the end of July 1944. It was present for Operation Totalize, Operation Tractable, and the Battle of Falaise. After reaching the River Seine, they advanced along the French coast to Belgium.

==== Northwest Europe ====
After France and Belgium the brigade, still part of 4th Armoured, was involved in the critical Battle of the Scheldt, to open the port of Antwerp, to Allied shipping. Next came Operation Veritable clearing the land between the Rhine and Roer rivers and their last major operation of the war the Battle of the Reichswald.

==== Battle of Moerbrugge ====
The 10th Infantry Brigade was tasked to cross the Ghent Canal about five kilometres south of Bruges at a small village called Oostkamp in early September 1944. Directly across the canal from Oostkamp was another small village named Moerbrugge. The canal is about 20 metres wide and very deep. Opposition was not expected so only one battalion was chosen for the crossing: The Argyll and Sutherland Highlanders of Canada.

Two batteries of the 15th Field Regiment, RCA, were placed in support and The South Alberta Regiment placed its tanks on the friendly side of the canal at either side of the crossing point and hold the flanks of the crossing with their fire along with the Vickers machine guns of The New Brunswick Rangers. The 3-inch (76 mm) mortars of the Argylls and the 4.2-inch (110 mm) mortars of the Rangers were in support.
