= 23rd Field Regiment, RCA =

The 23rd Field Regiment (SP), RCA, was part of the 4th Canadian Armoured Division of the II Canadian Corps, of the First Canadian Army in World War II. Formed in Canada in 1942, the regiment consisted of three batteries that were recruited mainly from Ontario. After a period of training in Canada the unit deployed to the United Kingdom in July 1943. The month after D-Day, the regiment landed in France and subsequently participated in the breakout campaign from Normandy into Belgium and the Netherlands, before seeing their final actions of the war in Germany.

== Formation and sub-units ==
The 23rd Field Regiment (SP) was part of the Royal Canadian Artillery (RCA) and an order was issued in April 1942 to mobilize an HQ Battery and three separate gun batteries. From May to July 1942, the three batteries formed up at the Canadian Artillery Training Centre A2 (CATC A2) in Petawawa, Ontario. The (SP) in the regiment's name denotes that it was a self-propelled artillery regiment.

The regiment trained in Canada from May 1942 to July 1943 and in England from July 1943 to July 1944, then went into action in France on 26 July 1944, seven weeks after D-Day. The regiment participated in the breakout campaign, on the "Green Up – Maple Leaf Up" route from Normandy, France, into Belgium and the Netherlands, and they ended action in Germany.

The three batteries that made up the 23rd Field Regiment were:

1. "The 31st", which had formed part of the 7th (Toronto) Field Regiment (Reserve) mostly from Toronto, Ontario. Its company name was "Peter" and the troops' initials were A (Abel) and B (Baker).
2. "The 36th", which was from the areas of Cobourg, Port Hope, and Peterborough, Ontario. Its company name was "Queen" & the troops' initials were C (Charlie) & D (Dog).
3. "The 83rd", from the 8th Field Brigade (Reserve) from the areas of Hamilton, Brantford, and St. Catharines, Ontario. Its company name was "Roger" and the troops' initials were E (Easy) and F (Fox).

== Activities in the Second World War ==
=== Training in Canada and the United Kingdom ===
- 9 May – 31 July 1942 – Canadian Artillery Training Centre A2, Petawawa, Ontario
- August 1942 – Sussex Military Camp, Sussex, New Brunswick
- August, September 1942 – Tracadie Camp, Tracadie, New Brunswick
- September 1942 – June 1943 – Sussex Military Camp, Sussex, New Brunswick
- June, July 1943 – Tracadie Camp, Tracadie, New Brunswick
- July 1943 – Sussex Military Camp, Sussex, New Brunswick
- 23 July 1943 – to UK aboard the RMS Queen Elizabeth
- 27 July 1943 – arrive Gourock Harbour, Scotland
- July, August 1943 — Chobham Common Reception Camp for 10 days
- August–November 1943 – Eastbourne Camp in Meads Village, Eastbourne. **31st** billeted on Dalton, Derwent and Milnthorpe Roads with Officers' Mess at a house called The Ridge on Bolsover Road, the **36th** on Edensor Road, with Battery HQ on Upper Dukes Drive and Officers' and Sergeants' mess at Tudor Croft on Baslow Road, and the **83rd** on Edensor Road with Battery HQ at Holywell Priory and Sergeants' Mess at Meads End.
- November 1943 – Larkhill Gunnery Camp (British School of Artillery)
- December 1943 – Eastbourne Camp
- December 1943 – Redesdale Camp
- December 1943 – February 1944 – Eastbourne Camp
- February 1944 – Larkhill Gunnery Camp, Salisbury Plains
- February – March 1944 – Eastbourne Camp
- March – June 1944 – Pippingford Park
- July 1944 – Camped in field about 1-mile from Pippingford Park
- July 1944 – Wanstead Common Marshalling Camp
- 24 July 1944 – convoy through Straits of Dover toward France

=== Action in France ===
Map of the 23rd Field Regiment's travels during World War II. Locations shown are highlighted in bold in the text.

Note: Locations shown in the map are highlighted in bold in the following section.

- 26 July 1944 – Disembarked at Arromanches and moved inland to Banville area, near Caen.
- July to September 1944 – activity in areas of **Meauvaines**, south of Caen near Ifs, Mondeville, Four, Soliers, Grentheville, LaHogue, Tilly, Operation Totalize (the breakout from **Caen** perimeter and push down Route Nationale 158 to Falaise), Hill 180, 195 and 206 – south of Bretteville-le-Rabet, Saint-André-sur-Orne and south of Ifs, Verrières, Gausmesnil, Roquancourt, Caillouet, River Laize, Bretteville-le-Rabet, Hautmesnil, St. Aignon de Cramesnil, Renemesnil, Operation Tallulah — then changed to Operation Tractable (intention of smashing through the anti-tank screen between Quesnay Woods and Potigny along the River Laison, crossing the river and striking on to **Falaise**, at the same time seizing crossing of the Rivers Ante and Dives), River Laison at Rouvres, Olendon, Perrières, Le Moutiers-en-Auge, Le Menil Girard (north-east of **Trun**), 31st battery – River La Vie and River Touques, **Rouen**, Coudehard, Monnai, Bernay, (liberated) Bout de la Ville, St. Pierre les Elbeuf, River Seine, Criqueboeuf-sur-Seine just north-west of Pont de L'Arche, Ymaro, Le Hamel aux Batiers, Grainville-sur-Ry, 36th Battery to Crenon River, Boissay, 83rd Battery to **Forges-les-Eaux**, Orival, Airaines, Wanel, Sorel just west of the Somme, high ground overlooking **Abbeville**, Wisquesm just this side of **St. Omer**, **Soex** and crossing the border into Belgium on 7 September 1944.

=== Action in Belgium ===
- September – October 1944 – activity in areas of Leysele, St. Riquiers, southwest of Bruges/Brugge just west of Den Daelo, Holding of the Leopold, Canal de Ghent, Moerbrugge, Oedelem, Syssele, over Leopold Canal, Cliet, Balgerhoek, **Eecloo**, Caprycke, Bouchante, Assenede, Sas van Gent, Philippe, north-west of Maldegem, near **Balgerhoek**, Eecloo, via Ghent to **Antwerp**, north of Schildt, Operation Suitcase, Putte, Pont Heuvel, Wildert near Roosendaal Canal and Wousche Plantage.

=== Action in Netherlands ===
- October 1944 to February 1945 – activity in areas of Spillebeek, Heimolen, **Bergen-op-Zoom**, Halsteren, Steenbergen, Dinteloord, Willemstad, Halsteren, end of Operation Suitcase, Roosendaal, Breda, Tilburg, Vught, east of 's-Hertogenbosch, (31st at Nulands, 83rd at Rosmalen and 36th in between), Boxtel, 36th in Gemonde, Hedikuizen, Breda area, 36th to St. Philipsland Peninsula, Operation Trojan,(simulate crossing of the Maas), Operation Schultz (intention of getting prisoners from other side of the river), Sprang north-east of Tilburg, s'Hertogenbosch, Vught and then off to Germany on 22 February 1945.

=== Action in Germany and the Netherlands ===
- February, March 1945 — activity in areas of Hau (near **Cleve**), Operation Blockbuster, Louisendorf, Keppeln, Uedemerbruch, The Hochwald Gap, Sonsbeck, Veen, **Xanten**, Winnenthal and headed back to Netherlands on 12 March 1945.
- 12 to 22 March 1945 – In Tilburg, in the Netherlands, for rest period.
- March 1945 – return to Germany, activity in areas of Huibsberden (practically on banks of the Rhine), Operation Plunder, **Emmerich** and Rees near Millingen (across Rhine).
- 2–4 April 1945 – activity in the Netherlands in the areas between Gelselaar and Diepenheim, Twente Canal, Wegdam and north of Delden.
- April, May 1945 – return to Germany, activity in areas of near Wilsum, **Emmlicheim,** Coevorden, Ruhle, Dortmund-Ems Canal, **Meppen**, north along canal to **Lathen**, **Sogel**, Werlte, Lorup, Neuvrees, **Friesoythe**, the Küsten Canal, Edewecht, Bad Zwischenahn, Rorbeck, **Rastede**, & on 3 May 1945, to their last gun position of the war, midway between Rastede and Nutte.
- 4 May 1945 — During evening it was heard on the Regiment's radio that all German forces in northwest Germany, Denmark and the occupied part of the Netherlands had surrendered to the 21st Army Group.
- 5 May 1945 — Cease fire was officially proclaimed at 8:00 am

=== War's end and after ===
- 7 May 1945 – VE Day – On 7 May 1945 at SHAEF headquarters in Reims, France, the Chief of Staff of the German Armed Forces High Command (OKW), General Alfred Jodl, signed the unconditional surrender documents for all German forces to the Allies.
- 14 May 1945 – Major-General Christopher Vokes, GOC, 4th Canadian Armoured Division, addressed the Regiment at Ocholt, Germany.
- 8 June 1945 – "Last Parade" of armour in the Netherlands. Giving the salute during the march past was Major G.H.V. Naylor (temporary Commanding Officer) and taking the salute from the reviewing stand was Major-General Christopher Vokes.
- 29 June 1945 – Armoured guns turned in at Nijmegen, in a "Farewell to the Guns" ceremony.

== Battle casualties ==
The regiment suffered the following casualties:

- 25 Killed
- 64 Wounded
- 6 Prisoners of War

== Honours and awards ==
The following honours and awards were bestowed upon members of the regiment during the war:

- 1 — Distinguished Service Order (Hogarth)
- 4 — Military Cross (Baker, Buchner, Cameron, Conquest)
- 1 - Bronzen Kruis (BK) - Netherlands (Brody)
- 1 – Croix de Guerre avec Palme – French (Hogarth)
- 1 – Croix de Guerre avec Bronze Star – French (Munce)
- 1 – American Bronze Star (Cowan)
- 1 — Member of the Most Excellent Order of the British Empire (James)
- 8 — Mention in Despatches (Buchner, Hennessy, Rimmer, Betteridge, Budway, Smith, White, Wilson)
- 9 – Commander-in-Chief's Certificate (Beatty, Bignell, Buchner, Gardner, Kane, Kelly, McDermott, Munce, White)

== Commanding officers ==
The following officers commanded the 23rd Field Regiment during the war:

- Lieutenant-Colonel J.A. Robertson (Montreal) from April 1942 to January 1943
- Lieutenant-Colonel G.W. Wishart (Toronto) from January to March 1943
- Lieutenant-Colonel K.N. Lander (Toronto) from March 1943 to August 1944
- Lieutenant-Colonel R.E. Hogarth (Timmins) from August 1944 to cease fire in May 1945
