= Wolfgang Erdmann =

German general during World War II (1898-1946)

- Born: 13 November 1898; Königsberg, Kingdom of Prussia, German Empire
- Died: 5 September 1946 (aged 47); British POW camp Munsterlager, Munster, Allied-occupied Germany
- Military career
- Allegiance: German Empire; Weimar Republic); Nazi Germany
- Branch: Prussian Army; Freikorps; Reichswehr; Army; Luftwaffe
- Service years: 1916–45
- Rank: Generalleutnant
- Commands: 18. Luftwaffen-Feld-Division; Fallschirmjäger-Division Erdmann; 7th Parachute Division
- Conflicts: World War I World War II: Invasion of Poland; Battle of France; Operation Market Garden; Operation Veritable; Operation Varsity
- Awards: Knight's Cross of the Iron Cross
- Other work: Graduate engineer (Dipl.-Ing.)

Wolfgang Erdmann (13 November 1898 – 5 September 1946) was a German general during World War II. He was a recipient of the Knight's Cross of the Iron Cross of Nazi Germany.

== Promotions ==
- 10 January 1916 Fahnenjunker (Officer Candidate)
- 8 November 1916 Fähnrich (Officer Cadet)
- 25 January 1917 Leutnant (2nd Lieutenant) without Patent (ernannt)
  - 1 October 1920 received Rank Seniority (RDA) from 1 February 1917
- 1 April 1925 Oberleutnant (1st Lieutenant)
- 1 April 1933 Hauptmann (Captain)
  - 1936 received new RDA from 1 October 1932
- 1 October 1936 Major with RDA from 1 August 1936
  - 14 October 1937 received new RDA from 1 March 1936
- 1 January 1939 Oberstleutnant (Lieutenant Colonel)
  - 9 February 1940 received new RDA from 1 October 1938
- 1 November 1940 Oberst (Colonel) with RDA from 1 June 1940
  - 21 April 1942 received new RDA from 1 March 1940
- 1 March 1943 Generalmajor (Major General) with RDA from 1 September 1943
- 1 July 1944 Generalleutnant (Lieutenant General)

== Awards and decorations ==
- Iron Cross (1914), 2nd and 1st Class
- Wound Badge (1914) in Black
- Silesian Eagle, 2nd Grade
- Honour Cross of the World War 1914/1918 with Swords
- Wehrmacht Long Service Award, 4th to 2nd Class
- Anschluss Medal
- Sudetenland Medal “Prague Castle” clasp
- Repetition Clasp 1939 to the Iron Cross 1914, 2nd and 1st Class
  - 2nd Class (16 September 1939)
  - 1st Class (14 June 1940)
- West Wall Medal in 1940
- Front Flying Clasp of the Luftwaffe for Bombers in Bronze
- War Merit Cross, 2nd Class with Swords (30 January 1943)
- 2 Tank Destruction Badges for Individual Combatants
- German Cross in Gold (28 December 1943)
- Knight's Cross of the Iron Cross on 8 February 1945 as Generalleutnant and commander of 7. Fallschirmjäger-Division

Military offices
Preceded by Generalleutnant Wolfgang von Chamier-Glisczinski	Fliegerführer Kroatien; 26 August 1943 – 30 April 1944	Succeeded by Generalmajor Walter Hagen
Preceded by None	Commander of Fallschirmjäger-Division Erdmann; 20 August 1944 – 8 October 1944	Succeeded by Redesignated 7. Fallschirmjäger-Division
Preceded by Previously Fallschirmjäger-Division Erdmann	Commander of 7. Fallschirmjäger-Division; 9 October 1944 – 8 May 1945	Succeeded by None
