= 7th Parachute Division =

German WWII airborne division

- German: 7. Fallschirmjäger-Division
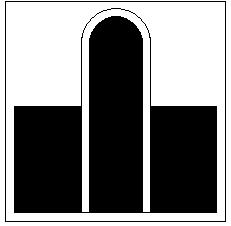
- Unit insignia
- Active: 1944–45
- Disbanded: 1945
- Country: Germany
- Branch: Luftwaffe
- Type: Fallschirmjäger
- Role: Airborne forces
- Size: Division
- Engagements: World War II; Western Front; Operation Veritable; Razing of Friesoythe

Commanders
- Notable commanders: Wolfgang Erdmann

The 7th Parachute Division (German: 7. Fallschirmjäger-Division) was a fallschirmjäger (airborne) division of the German military during the Second World War, active from 1944 to 1945.

The division was first formed as Fallschirmjäger-Division Erdmann in early September 1944 from a collection of training units and remnants of other formations, and named after its commander Wolfgang Erdmann. It fought in the south-eastern part of the Netherlands during Operation Market-Garden in September, and on 29 October was redesignated as the 7. Fallschirmjäger-Division. It contained the 19th, 20th and 21st Fallschirmjäger Regiments and other divisional support units.

The division fought on the Western Front for the remainder of the war, surrendering at Oldenburg with the end of hostilities.
