= Oostkamp =

- Municipality
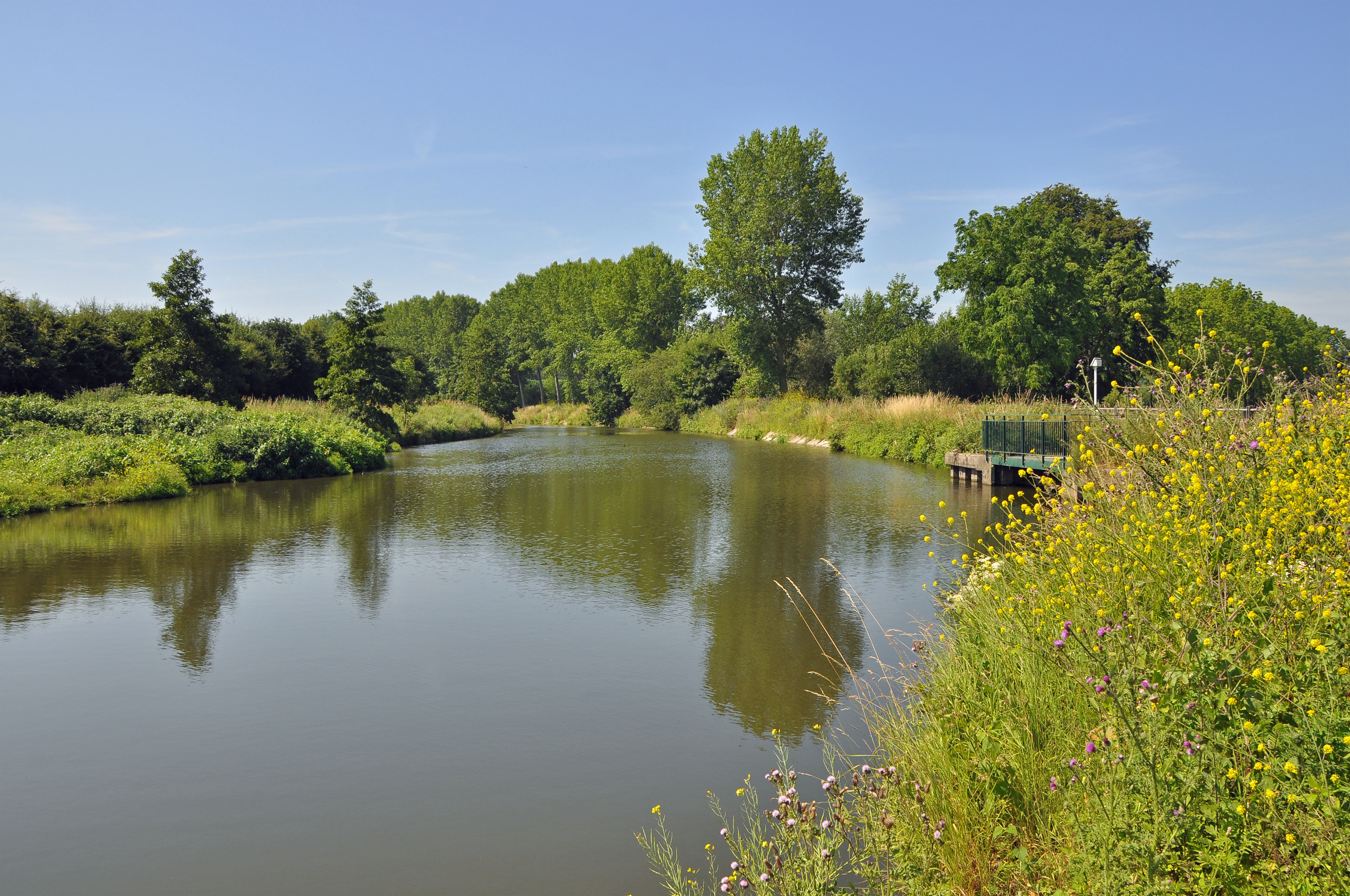
- Oostkamp Rivierbeek

- Flag Coat of arms

- Location of Oostkamp in West Flanders
- Interactive map of Oostkamp
- Location in Belgium
- Coordinates: 51°09′N 03°14′E
- Country: Belgium
- Community: Flemish Community
- Region: Flemish Region
- Province: West Flanders
- Arrondissement: Bruges

Government
  - Mayor: Jan de Keyser (CD&V)
  - Governing party: CD&V

Area
  - Total: 80.13 km^{2} (30.94 sq mi)

Population (2018-01-01)
  - Total: 23,580
  - Density: 294.3/km^{2} (762.2/sq mi)
- Postal codes: 8020
- NIS code: 31022
- Area codes: 050
- Website: www.oostkamp.be

Oostkamp (Dutch pronunciation: [ˈoːstkɑmp]; West Flemish: Ôostkamp) is a municipality located in the Belgian province of West Flanders. The municipality comprises the villages of Hertsberge, Oostkamp proper, Ruddervoorde and Waardamme. On January 1, 2019, Oostkamp had a total population of 23,698. The total area is 79.65 km² which gives a population density of 289 inhabitants per km².

== History ==
The name Oostkamp comes from the Medieval name Orscamp, meaning place of the horses. The old word ors is a cognate of the English word horse.

=== Oostkamp during World War II ===
The Canadian 4th Armoured Division liberated the village on 8 September 1944 (World War II) during the Battle of Moerbrugge. A monument was erected by the Ghent-Bruges Canal to honour the 53 Canadian casualties.

=== Fusion of 1977 ===
After the passing of the Unitary Law, the four villages of Oostkamp proper, Hertsberge, Ruddervoorde and Waardamme became the municipality of Greater Oostkamp.

== Landmarks and Monuments ==
=== Churches ===
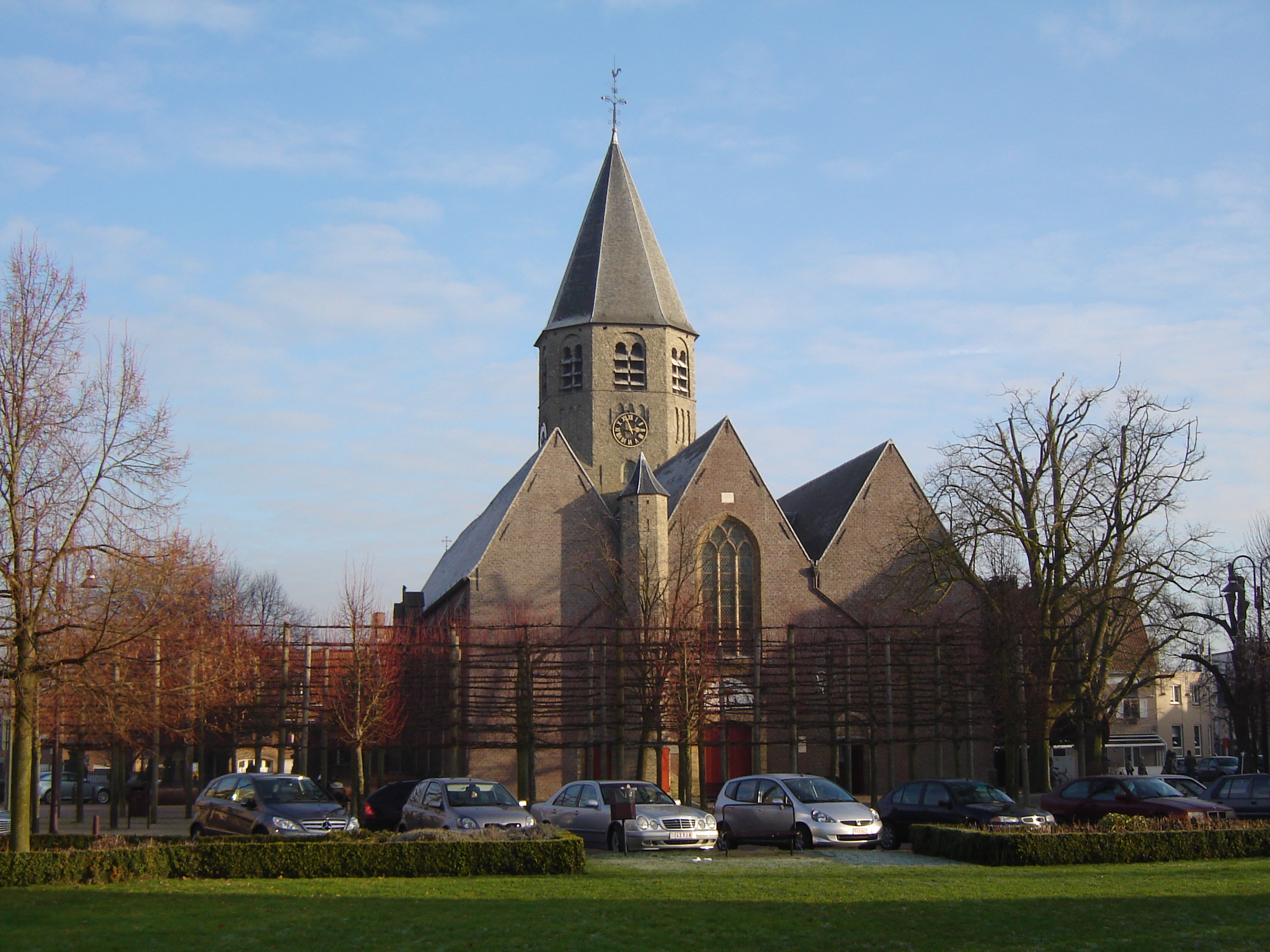
Sint-Pieterskerk

- Sint Pieters-in-de-Bandenkerk, a hall church with a Romanesque tower (12th century), a late Gothic middle nave, and a baroque organ from 1717.
- Macieberrot, a Marian grotto from 1914

=== OostCampus ===
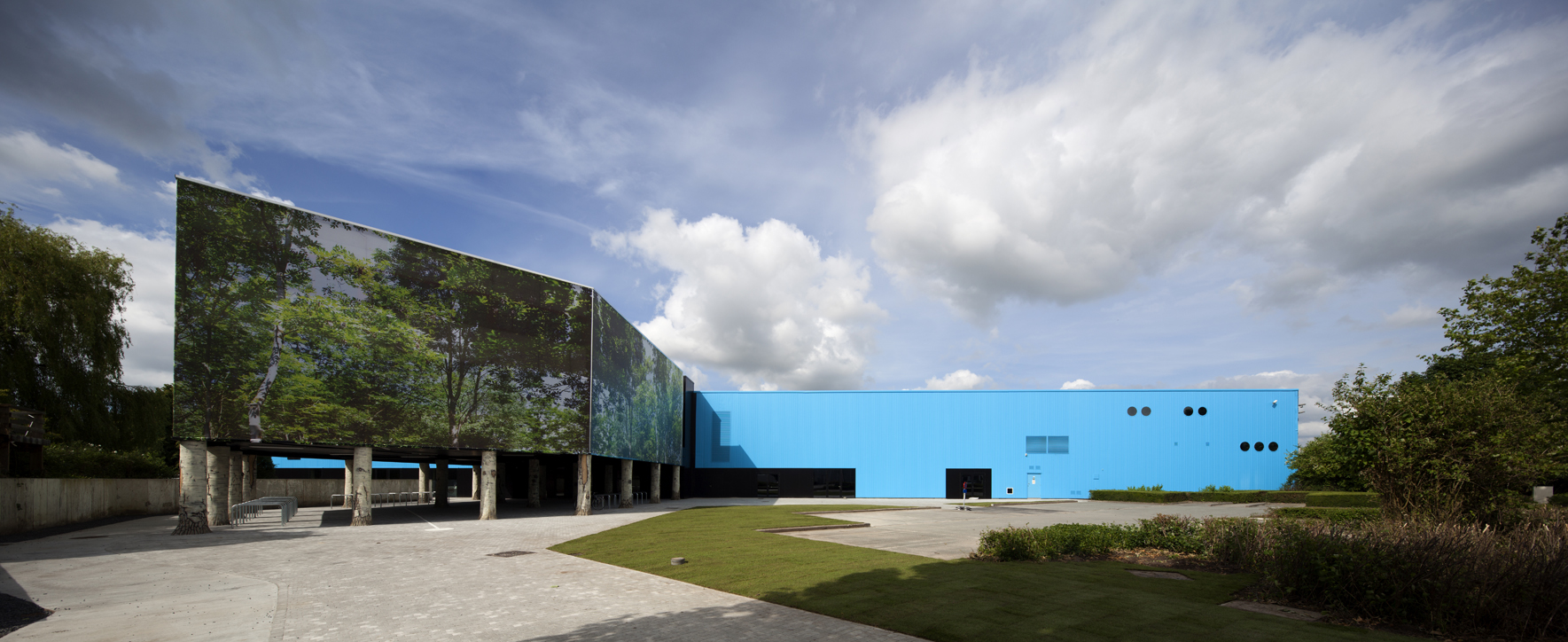
OostCampus, City hall and Civic Centre (Siemenslaan 8, 8020 Oostkamp)

In 2012, all the different municipal services which had been accommodated over the years in a scattered collection of facilities, moved to a new complex: 'OostCampus'. On March 9, 2017, the mayor and the chairman of the Social Services (OCMW) also moved from their former site in 'Beukenpark' to OostCampus, which is now effectively the City Hall and Civic Centre of Oostkamp.

The building, designed by Spanish architect Carlos Arroyo, has received important awards, such as:

- Gold Prijs Bouwmeester 2013 awarded by the Government of Flanders, in the category 'Renovation'.
- Archdaily's 65 best new buildings in the world 2012
- Holcim Silver Award for Sustainable Construction in Europe 2011
- It was featured in the 14th edition of the Venice Biennale of Architecture 2012

=== Kastelen: Castles, Châteaux and Mansions ===
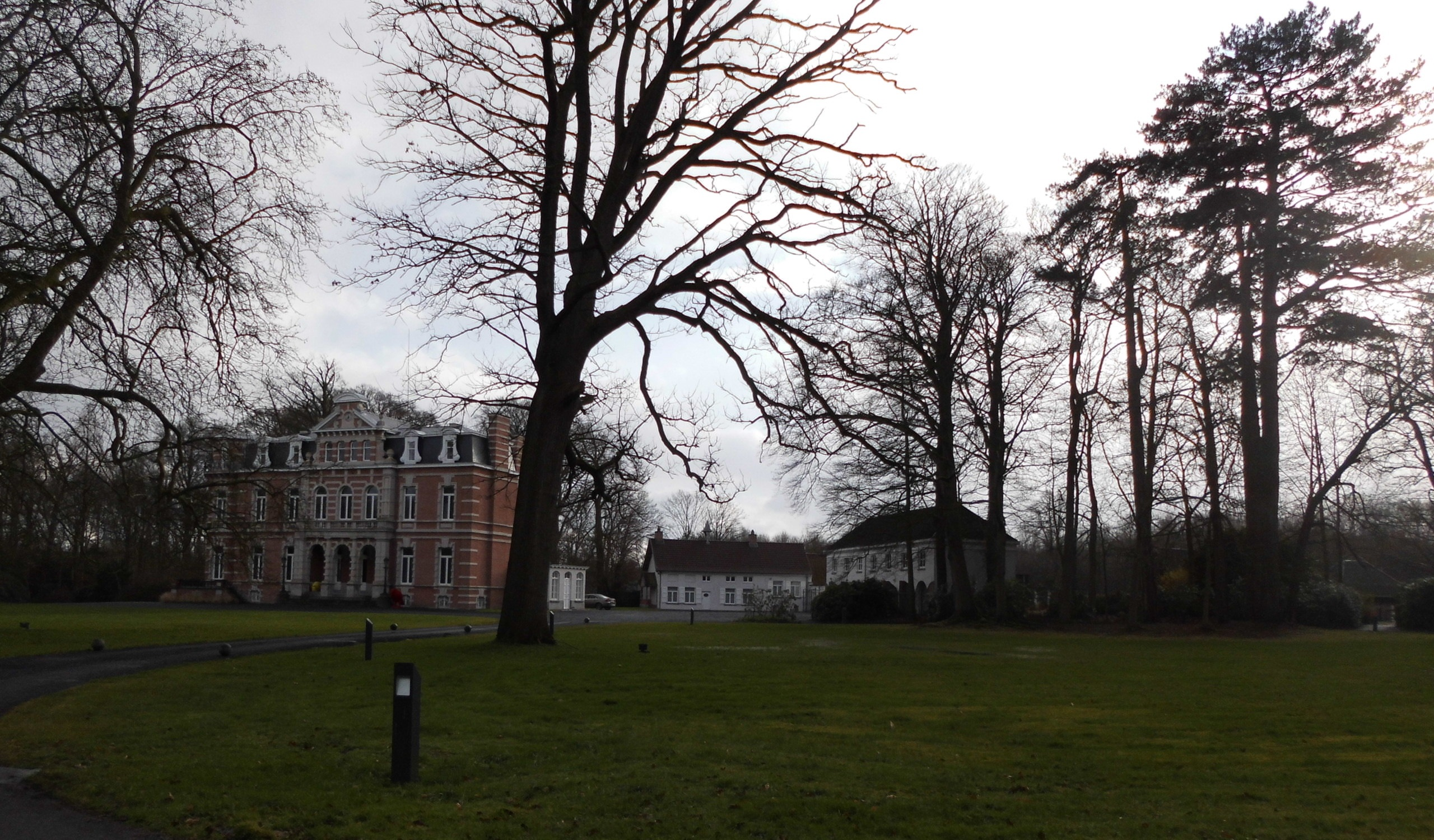
Kasteel De Cellen

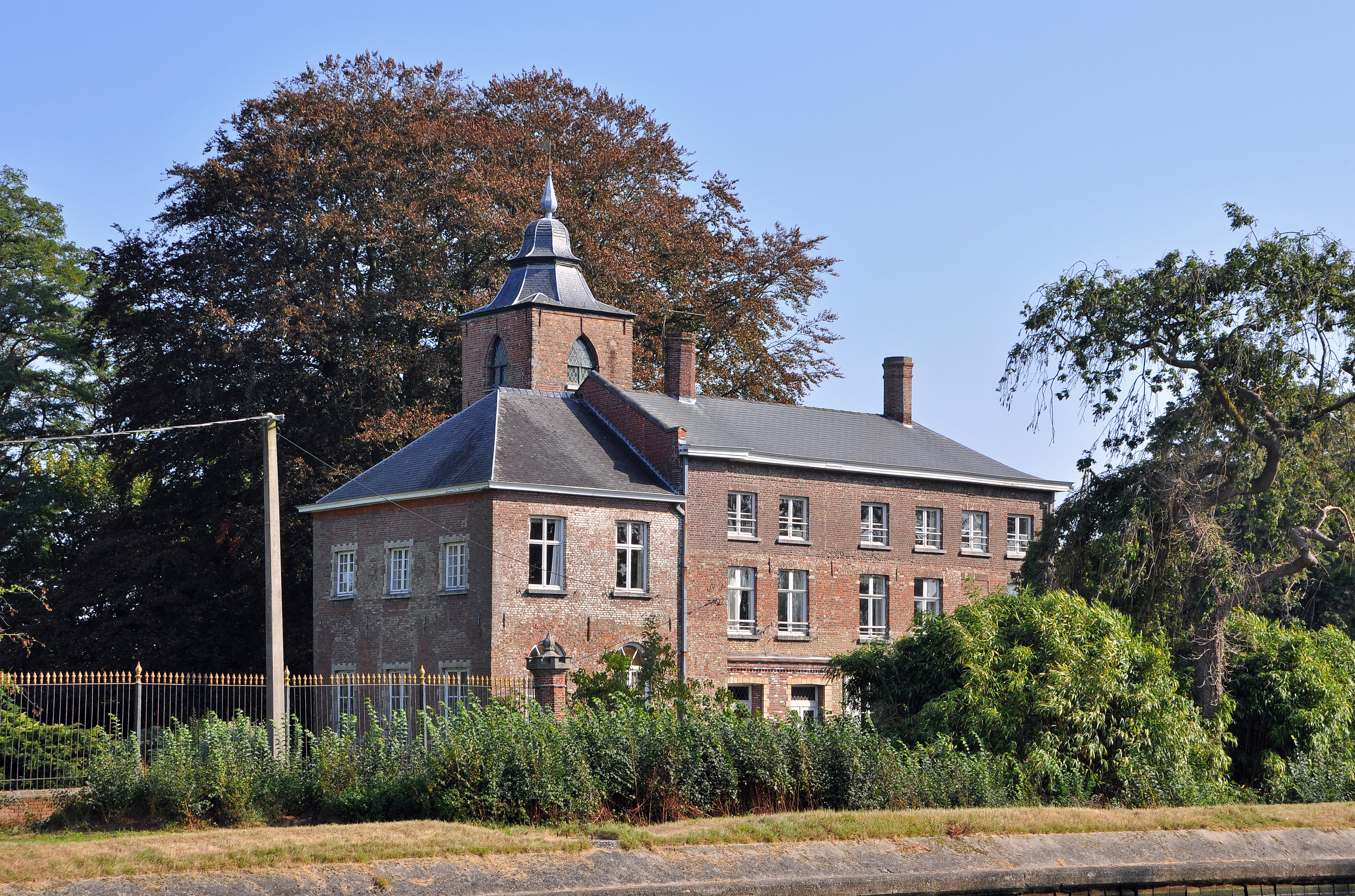
Kasteel Kevergem

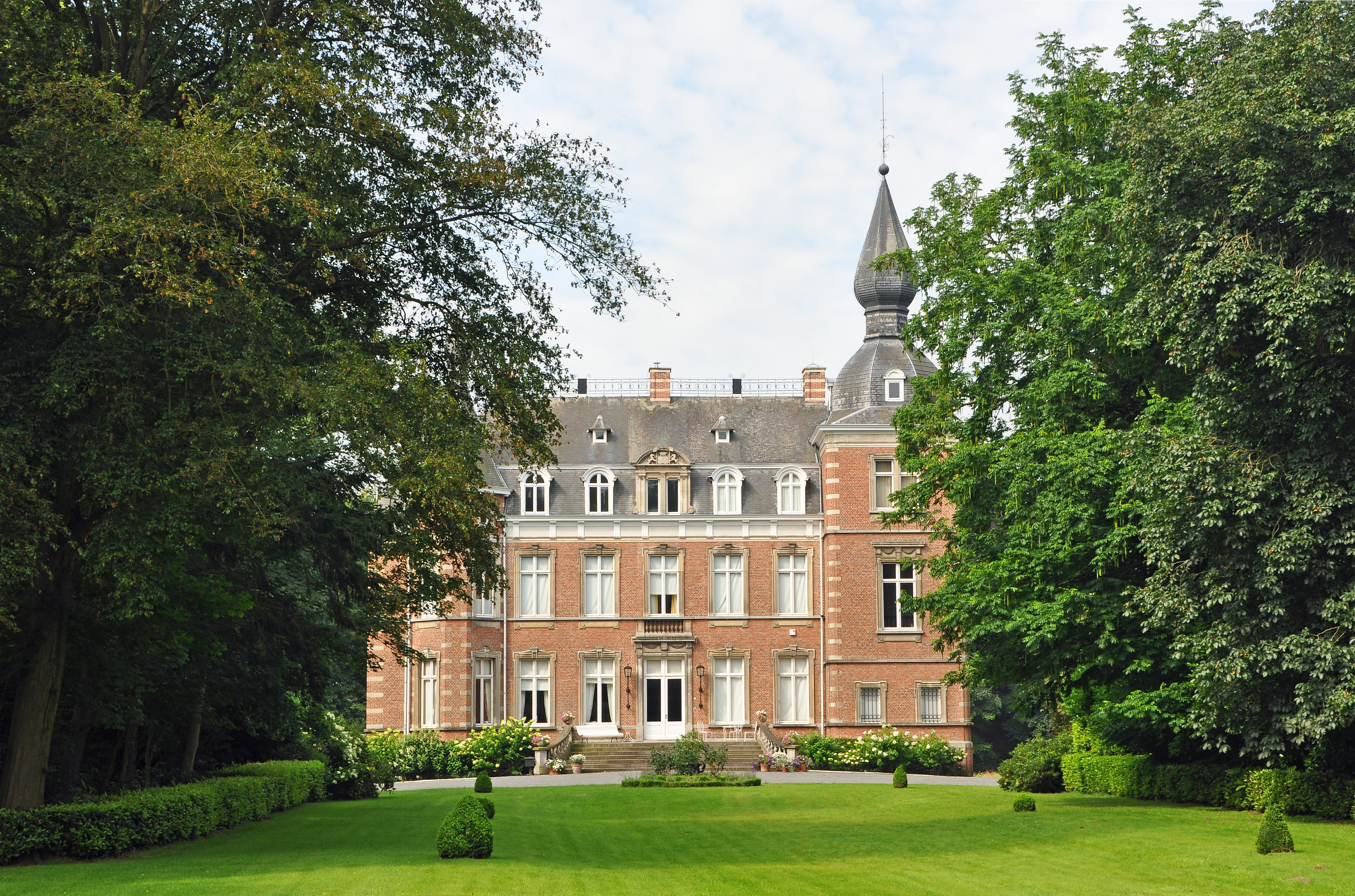
Kasteel Pecsteen in Ruddervoorde

Oostkamp has about twenty outstanding examples of Kasteel (plural kastelen), meaning castles, châteaux and mansions. These were erected as 'countryside retreats' of 'leisure houses' by the nobles and merchants of the area, many of them with permanent abodes in nearby Bruges. Most kastelen are private property and therefore not to be visited. Many are visible from the public road.

==== Oostkamp ====
- Kasteel Gruuthuse (private residence), initially inhabited in the 13th century by the Gruuthuse family, now by the counts d'Ursel.
- Kasteel de Breidels (private residence), inhabited by baron Albert Peers de Nieuwburgh.
- Kasteel Newburgh (private residence), inhabited by the baron Snoy.
- Kasteel Schoonhove (private residence), inhabited by baron Rotsart de Hertaing.
- Kasteel Kevergem (private residence), inhabited by lady Lucie de Schietere de Lophem.
- Kasteel de Herten, built by Baron van der Plancken, purchased by the Global Estate Group in 2012
- Kasteel de Cellen, built by knight de Bie de Westvoorde, now the premises of an insurance company
- Kasteel Macieberg, built by the family Arents de Beerteghem, now decorated as the Freinetschool Ivy
- Kasteel Beukenpark (former castle of Les Aubépines), built by the family Beaucourt de Noortvelde, until 2017 an administrative center of the municipality of Oostkamp
- Villa 't Valkennest (Châlet Flore and Le Chenoy), built by the family Kervyn de Meerendré, now a youth centre.
- Kasteel Cruydenhove, now the restaurant and reception rooms for the Van der Valk hotel.

==== Ruddervoorde ====
- Kasteel Pecsteen (private residence), inhabited by Baron Pecsteen.
- Kasteel Raepenburg (private residence), inhabited by the family d'Udekem d'Acoz.
- Kasteel Sint-Hubertus (private residence), built by the family van Outryve d'Ydewalle, now inhabited by the Knights de Schietere de Lophem.
- Kasteel Lakenbos also Rood Kasteel (private residence), built by Knight Eugène-Augustin van Outryve d'Ydewalle, notorious for the murder of his son-in-law Jhr. Henri d'Udekem d'Acoz.
- Kasteel De Akker (private residence), built by Jhr. Adhémar de Thibault de Boesinghe and Emma van Outryve d'Ydewalle.
- Kasteel Doeveren (private residence), built by the family de Thibault de Boesinghe, later the property of families Arents de Beerteghem and Janssens de Bisthoven.
- Kasteel Zorgvliet, built by marquis de Croester and later the property of Paul van Caloen de Basseghem. The castle was burned during a thunderstorm.
- Landhuis Leegendael, built by Knight Guy de Schietere de Lophem, now a Bed and Breakfast.

==== Waardamme ====
- Kasteel de Woesten (private residence), built by the family Peers de Nieuwburgh and later owned by the family Mahieu-De Witte.
- Kasteel Rooiveld (private residence), built in the 15th century as a hunting lodge by the family de Melgar de Breydelaere de Sporkinshove. Later inhabited by the family Janssens de Bisthoven

==== Hertsberge ====
- Kasteel van Hertsberge (private residence), built and inhabited by the family of baron Rapaert de Grass.

==== Moerbrugge ====
- Blauw Kasteel (private residence), is a protected medieval castle and probably the oldest preserved castle of Oostkamp. Previously owned by marquis Paolo Arconati-Visconti, the family Peers de Nieuwburgh bought the castle in 1979. In 2000, they sold the castle to the current owners who started a thorough restoration campaign.

== Sister cities ==
- - Chaumont, France
- - Bad Langensalza, Germany
- - Bad Nauheim, Germany
