= 4th Canadian Division =

Formation of the Canadian Army

4th Canadian Division; 4th Canadian Infantry Division; 4th Canadian (Armoured) Division
- 4th Canadian Division formation patch
- Active: April 1916–1919; 24 May 1940 (Note: As the 4th Canadian Infantry Division. The Division was later redesignated as the 4th Canadian (Armoured) Division on 26 January 1942)–27 December 1945; 2013–10 September 2026
- Country: Canada
- Branch: Canadian Expeditionary Force (1916-1919); Canadian Army (1940-1945, 2013-2026)
- Type: Infantry (1916-1919, 1940-1942); Armoured (1942-1945, 2013-2026)
- Garrison/HQ: Denison Armoury, Toronto (1916-1919) (1940-1945) (2013-2026)
- Engagements: World War I; Battle of Le Transloy; Battle of Vimy Ridge; World War II; Western Front; Battle of Normandy; Razing of Friesoythe; Battle of the Scheldt

Commanders
- Notable commanders: David Watson; Lionel Frank Page; F. F. Worthington; George Kitching; Harry Wickwire Foster; Chris Vokes

The 4th Canadian Division was a formation of the Canadian Army. The division was first created as a formation of the Canadian Corps during the First World War. During the Second World War the division was reactivated as the 4th Canadian Infantry Division in May 1940 and then converted to armour and redesignated as the 4th Canadian (Armoured) Division in January 1942. Beginning in 1916 the division adopted a distinctive green-coloured formation patch as its insignia. In 2013 it was announced that Land Force Central Area would be redesignated 4th Canadian Division. In this most recent incarnation, the division was responsible for Canadian Army administration and training in the Canadian province of Ontario and was headquartered at Denison Armoury in Toronto until 2026. During the reorganization of Canadian Armed Forces in 2026, the 4th Canadian Division was stood-down.

== History ==
=== First World War ===
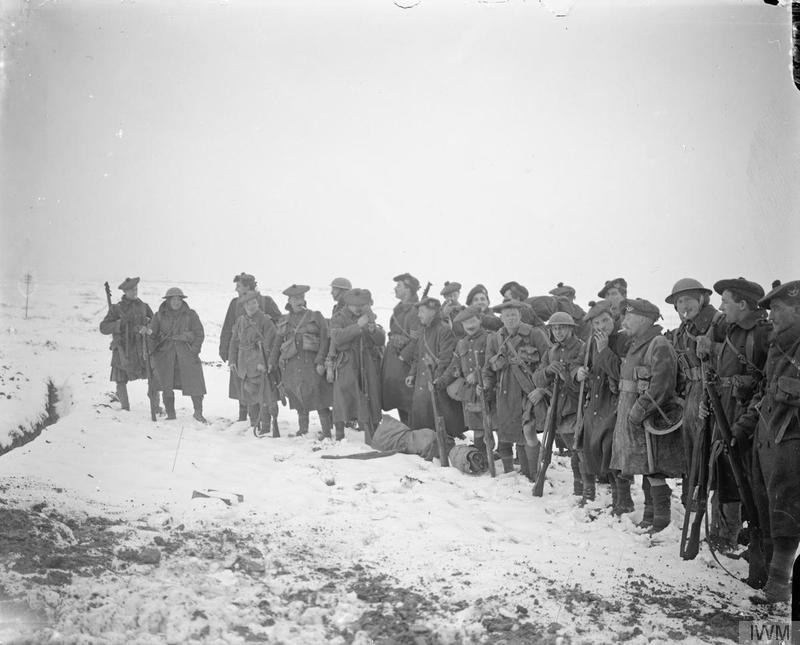
Troops of the 72nd Battalion (Seaforth Highlanders of Canada) halted in the snow. Bazentin, France February 1917.

The 4th Canadian Division was formed in Britain in April 1916 from several existing units and others scheduled to arrive shortly thereafter. Under the command of Major-general David Watson, the Division embarked for France in August of that year where they served both in the Western Front in France and in Flanders until Armistice Day. The 4th Canadian Division was a part of the Canadian Corps in the Battle of Vimy Ridge, which attacked and defeated the Germans, driving them from the ridge. As a result, the Canadians became known as masters of offensive warfare and an elite fighting force.

In the Battle of Vimy Ridge in April 1917, the 4th Canadian Division was given the job of capturing Hill 145, the highest and most important feature of Vimy Ridge. However, when they attempted to capture the hill, they were hampered by fire from the "Pimple", which was the other prominent height at Vimy Ridge. To capture Hill 145, forces which were supposed to attack the Pimple were redeployed and captured Hill 145.

=== Order of battle (1916–1919) ===
==== Infantry units ====
10th Canadian Brigade:

- 44th (Manitoba) Battalion Canadian Infantry. April 1916 – 11 November 1918. (Re-designated New Brunswick in August 1918);
- 46th (South Saskatchewan) Battalion Canadian Infantry. April 1916 – 11 November 1918;
- 47th (British Columbia) Battalion Canadian Infantry. April 1916 – 11 November 1918. (Re-designated West Ontario in February 1918);
- 50th (Calgary) Battalion Canadian Infantry. April 1916 – 11 November 1918.

11th Canadian Brigade:

- 54th (Kootenay) Battalion Canadian Infantry. April 1916 – 11 November 1918;
- 75th (Mississauga) Battalion Canadian Infantry. April 1916 – 11 November 1918;
- 87th (Canadian Grenadier Guards) Battalion Canadian Infantry. June 1916 – 11 November 1918 (transferred from 12th Canadian Brigade);
- 102nd (North British Columbia) Battalion Canadian Infantry. April 1916 – 11 November 1918.

12th Canadian Brigade:

- 38th (Ottawa) Battalion Canadian Infantry. June 1916 – 11 November 1918;
- 51st (Edmonton) Battalion Canadian Infantry. April 1916 – 13 November 1916 (Became the 51st Garrison Battalion);
- 72nd Battalion (Seaforth Highlanders of Canada), CEF. April 1916 – 11 November 1918;
- 73rd (Royal Highlanders) Battalion Canadian Infantry. April 1916 – 19 April 1917 (disbanded);
- 78th (Winnipeg Grenadier) Battalion Canadian Infantry. April 1916 – 11 November 1918;
- 85th (Nova Scotia Highlanders) Battalion Canadian Infantry. April 1917 – 11 November 1918;
- 87th (Canadian Grenadier) Battalion Canadian Infantry. April 1916 – June 1916. (transferred to 11th Canadian Brigade).

Pioneers:

- 67th (Western Scot) Pioneer Battalion Canadian Infantry. 1 September 1916 – 11 November 1918;

=== Battles and engagements on the Western Front ===
Year	Battles/engagements	Date(s)
1916	Battle of Le Transloy	1–17 October
1916	Battle of the Ancre Heights: (including capture of Regina Trench)	17 October – 11 November
1916	Battle of the Ancre	13–18 November
1917	Battle of Vimy Ridge	9–14 April
1917	Affairs South of the Souchez River	3–25 June
1917	Capture of Avion	26–29 June
1917	Battle of Hill 70	15–25 August
1917	Second Battle of Passchendaele	26 October – 10 November
1918	Battle of Amiens	9–11 August
1918	Actions round Damery	15–17 August
1918	Battle of Drocourt-Quéant	2–3 September
1918	Battle of the Canal du Nord	27 September – 1 October
1918	Battle of Valenciennes: (including capture of Mont Houy)	1–2 November
1918	Passage of the Grande Honnelle	5–7 November

=== Second World War ===
==== 4th Canadian (Armoured) Division ====
In response to the Battle of France, the 4th Canadian Division was reformed on 24 May 1940 as the 4th Canadian Infantry Division. On 26 January 1942, the 4th Canadian Infantry Division was redesignated as the 4th Canadian (Armoured) Division. The division proceeded overseas in 1942, with its two main convoys reaching the United Kingdom in August and October.

The division spent almost two years training in the United Kingdom before crossing to Normandy in July 1944. In the United Kingdom, it participated in war games together with the Polish 1st Armoured Division, and later fought in France, in the Low Countries, and in Germany; both divisions followed very close paths. The division participated in the later stages of the Battle of Normandy at the Falaise Pocket, the advance from Normandy and spent almost two months engaged at the Breskens Pocket as well as Operation Pheasant.

It wintered in the Netherlands, fought in Operation Blockbuster (26 February – 3 March 1945) and took part in the final advance across northern Germany.

=== Order of battle (1944–1945) ===
Formation sign used to identify vehicles of the division

- 4th Canadian Armoured Brigade
  - 21st Armoured Regiment (The Governor General's Foot Guards)
  - 22nd Armoured Regiment (The Canadian Grenadier Guards)
  - 28th Armoured Regiment (The British Columbia Regiment (Duke of Connaught's Own))
  - 1st Battalion, The Lake Superior Regiment (Motor)
- 10th Canadian Infantry Brigade:
  - 10th Independent Machine Gun Company (The New Brunswick Rangers)
  - 1st Battalion, The Lincoln and Welland Regiment
  - 1st Battalion, The Algonquin Regiment
  - 1st Battalion, The Argyll and Sutherland Highlanders of Canada (Princess Louise's)
  - 10th Infantry Brigade Ground Defence Platoon (Lorne Scots)
- Other units
  - 29th Armoured Reconnaissance Regiment (The South Alberta Regiment)
  - "D" Squadron, 25th Armoured Delivery Regiment (The Elgin Regiment), Canadian Armoured Corps
  - 15th Field Regiment, RCA
  - 23rd Field Regiment, RCA
  - 5th Anti-tank Regiment, RCA
  - 8th Light Anti-aircraft Regiment, RCA
  - 4th Canadian Armoured Division Engineers
    - 8th Field Squadron, RCE
    - 9th Field Squadron, RCE
    - 6th Field Park Squadron, RCE
    - 4th Canadian Armoured Division Bridge Troop, RCE
    - No. 46 Light Aid Detachment, RCEME
  - 4th Canadian Armoured Divisional Signals, R.C. Sigs
  - No. 4 Defence and Employment Platoon (Lorne Scots)
  - 12 Light Field Ambulance, RCAMC
  - No. 8 Provost Company, Canadian Provost Corps

=== General officers commanding ===
General Officer Commanding	Date(s)
Major General Lionel Page, DSO	10 June 1941 – 24 December 1941
Major General Frederick Worthington, CB, MC, MM	2 February 1942 – 29 February 1944
Major General George Kitching, DSO	1 March – 21 August 1944
Major General Harry W. Foster, CBE, DSO	22 August – 30 November 1944
Major General Chris Vokes, CBE, DSO	1 December 1944 – 5 June 1945

=== David Vivian Currie VC ===
David Vivian Currie VC was awarded the Victoria Cross for his actions in command of a battle group of tanks from the South Alberta Regiment, artillery, and infantry of the Argyll and Sutherland Highlanders of Canada at St. Lambert-sur-Dives, during the final actions to close the Falaise Gap. This was the only Victoria Cross awarded to a Canadian soldier during the Normandy campaign (from 6 June 1944 to the end of August 1944), and the only VC ever awarded to a member of the Royal Canadian Armoured Corps. Currie, 32 years old, was a major in the South Alberta Regiment. During the Battle of Falaise, Normandy, 18 to 20 August 1944, Currie was in command of a small mixed force of tanks, self-propelled anti-tank guns and infantry which had been ordered to cut off one of the main German escape routes. After Currie led the attack on the village of St. Lambert-sur-Dives and consolidated a position halfway inside it, he repulsed repeated enemy attacks over the next day and a half. Despite heavy casualties, Major Currie's command destroyed seven enemy tanks, twelve 88 mm guns and 40 vehicles, which led to the deaths of 300 German soldiers, 500 wounded and 1,100 captured. The remnants of two German armies were denied an escape route.

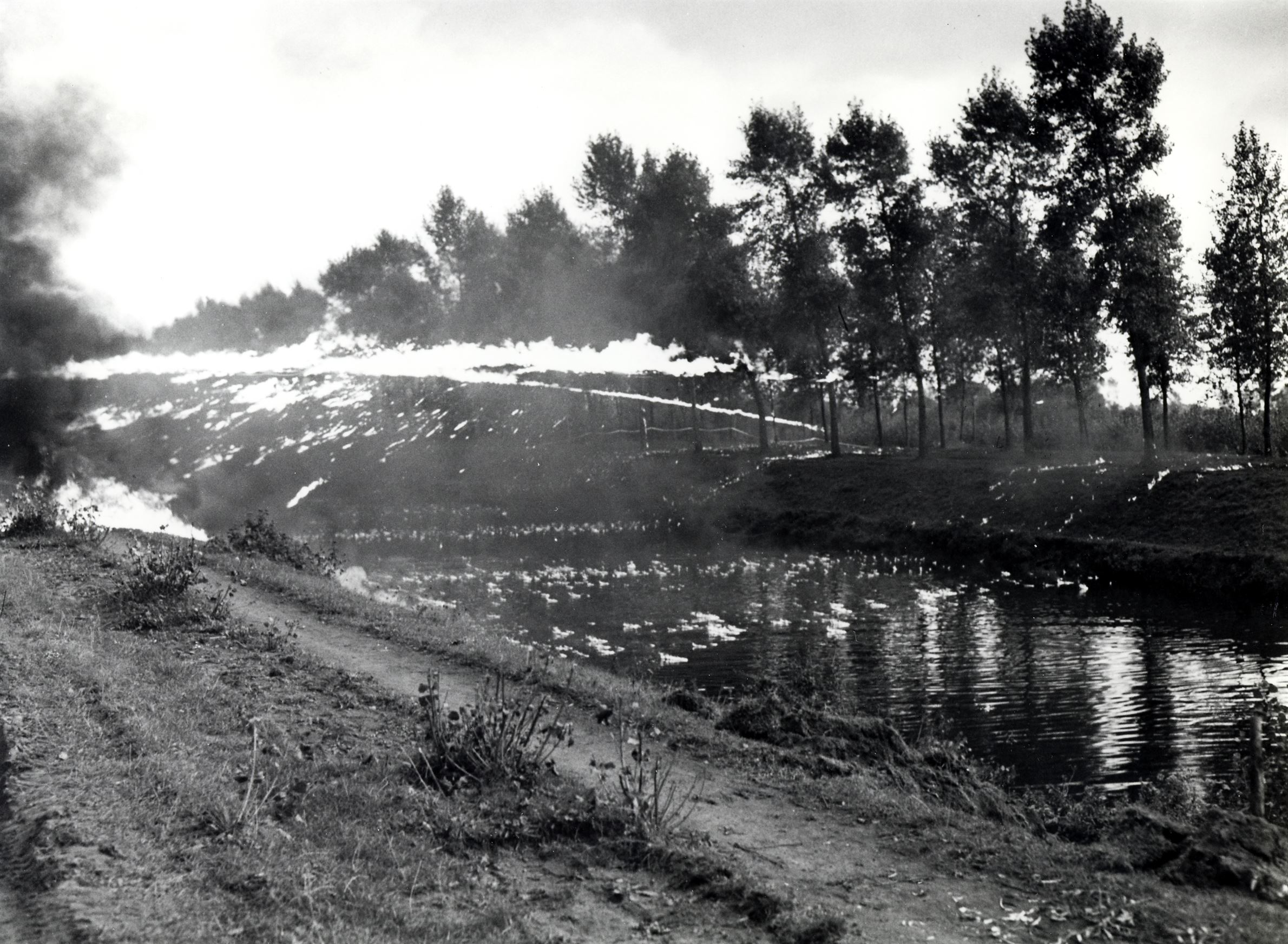
Members of the 4th Canadian (Armoured) Division demonstrating the use of flame throwers across a canal, Maldegem, October 1944.

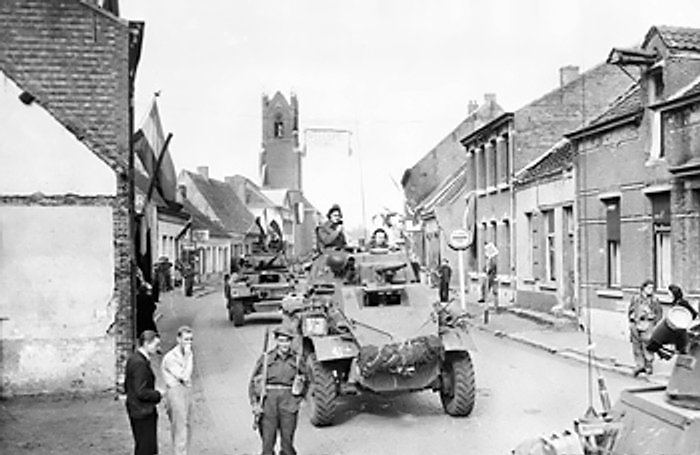
Armoured cars in the Belgian-Dutch border town of Putte – 11 October 1944

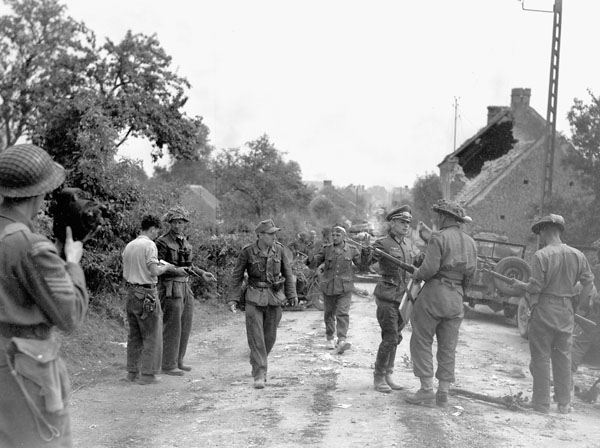
Major David V. Currie (with pistol), accepting the surrender of German troops at St. Lambert-sur-Dives, France, 19 August 1944. This photo captures the actions that led to him being awarded the Victoria Cross

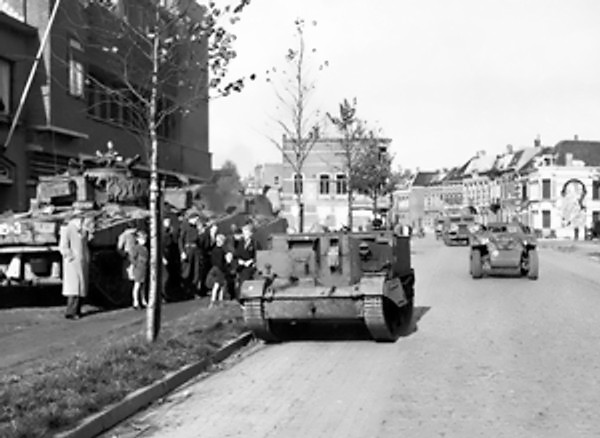
Canadians enter Bergen-op-Zoom, early November 1944

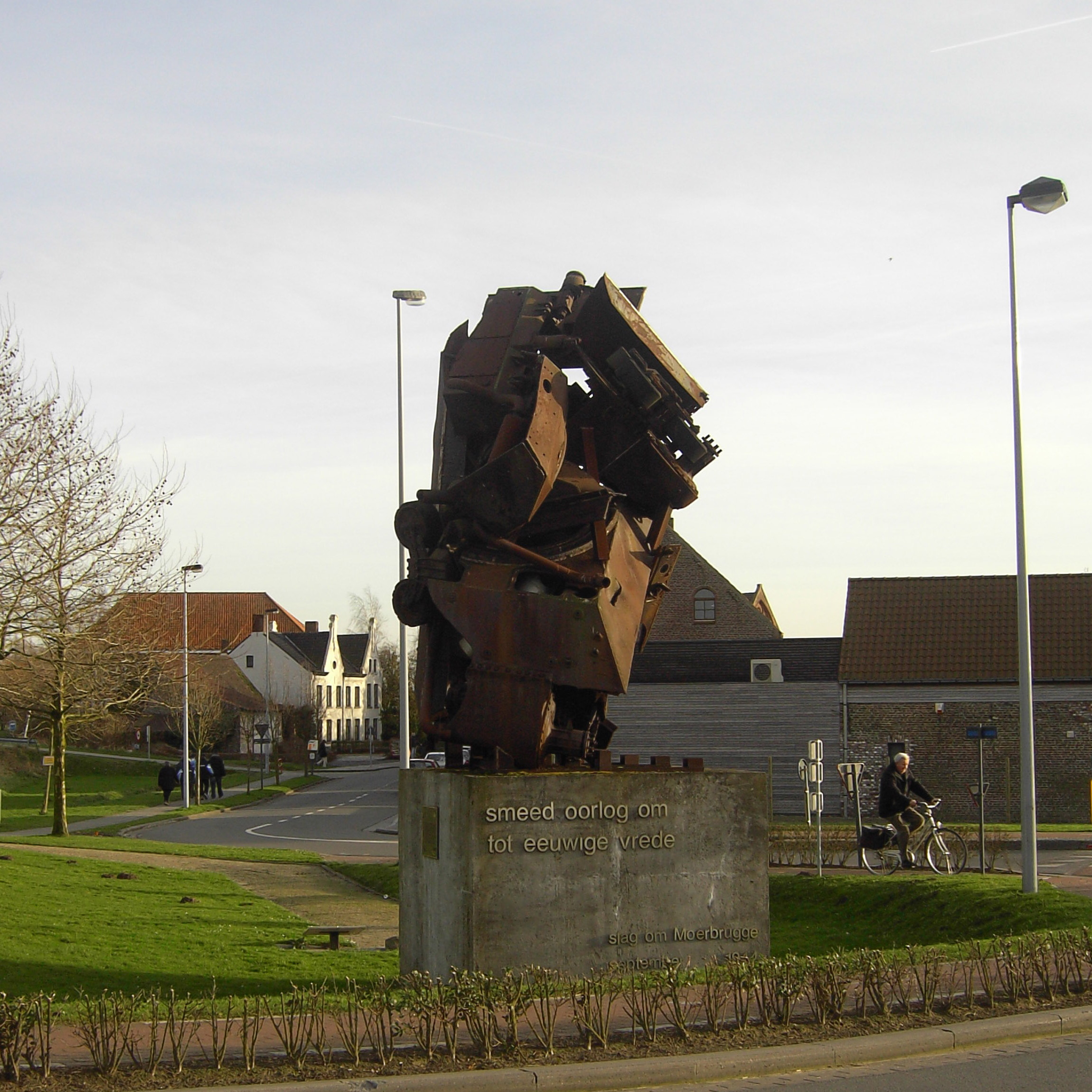
War Memorial in Moerbrugge

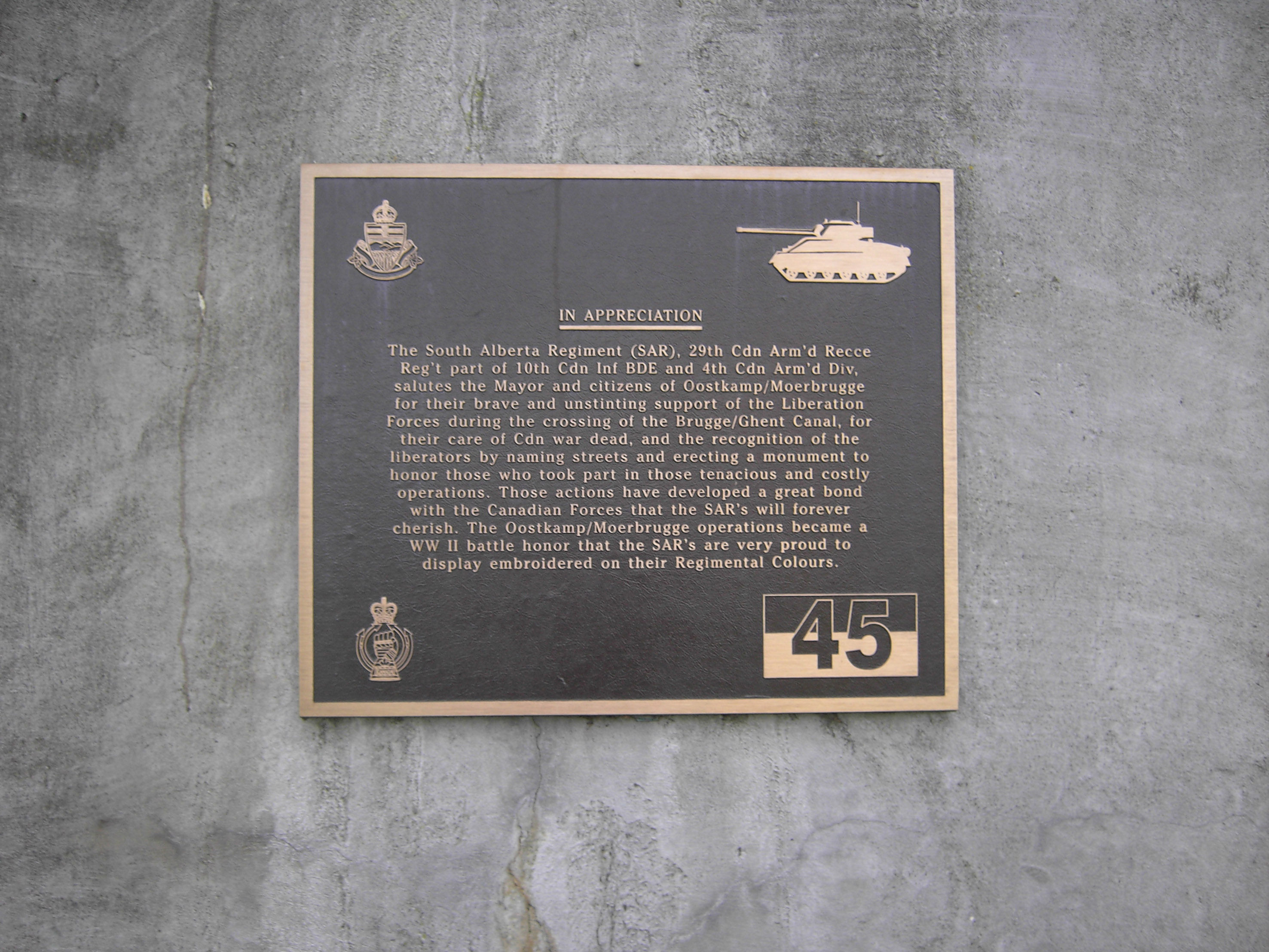
Plaque on the World War II Memorial in Moerbrugge

=== Domestic regional command (2013–2026) ===
The LFCA was created on 1 September 1991, taking command of what was previously Central Militia Area and the Regular Force Army units and formations in Ontario from the northern Lakehead region to the border with Quebec. At that point in time, the six subordinate militia districts were reorganized into four: Northern Ontario District, London District, Toronto District, and Ottawa District each one garrisoned by a brigade of militia troops and a small number of regular support staff. Later that decade, in 1997, the four reserve force districts were again reorganized into three brigade groups.

At the time of its creation in the early-1990s, it was housed on the grounds of the former base and subsequently moved ca 1993 to the Place Nouveau office tower at Yonge Street north of Finch Avenue; this was controversial as the offices of the area commander, Major-General Brian Vernon, were lavishly renovated, attracting political criticism and attention from the Auditor General of Canada.

In 2013, the LFCA was renamed the "4th Canadian Division". With this change of name, the formation was also granted the identifying patch and historical lineage of the division that fought in the two world wars.

On September 10, 2026, as part of an Army reorganization of switching from geographic divisions to functional divisions, 4th Canadian Division was stood down. The division headquarters was reorganized as the headquarters of the all new Canadian Army Support Division. Most of the division’s subordinate formations were transferred to other divisions. The 4th Canadian Division was transferred to the Supplementary Order of Battle.

==== Organization on 1 January 2026 ====
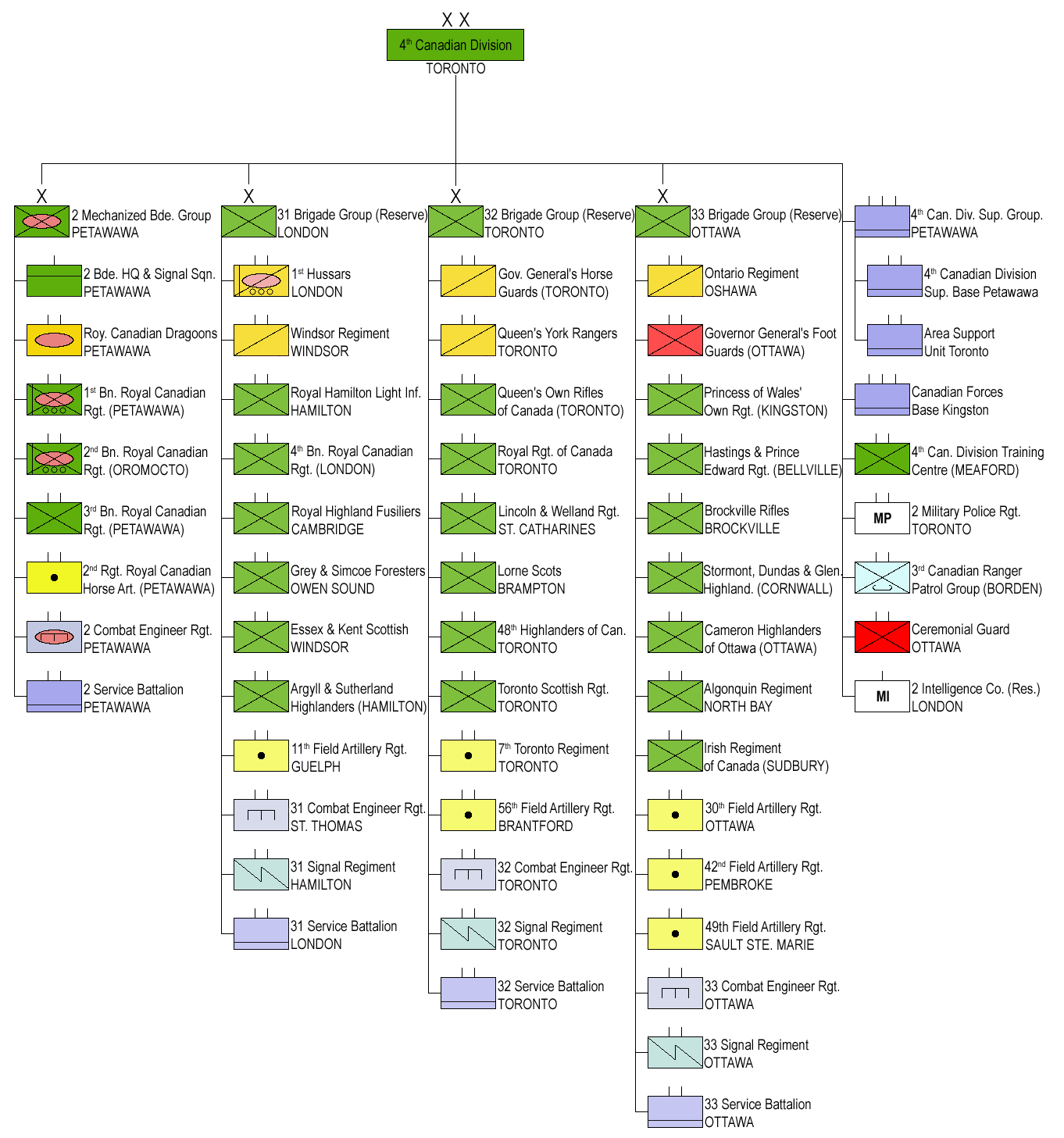
4th Canadian Division organization in 2020

Until 2026, division was headquartered in Toronto and covered the province of Ontario. It is now headquartered in Kingston, Ontario.

- 4th Canadian Division, in Toronto
  - 2 Canadian Mechanized Brigade Group, at CFB Petawawa
  - 31 Canadian Brigade Group, in London (covering Southwestern Ontario)
  - 32 Canadian Brigade Group, in Toronto (covering the Golden Horseshoe and Central Ontario)
  - 33 Canadian Brigade Group, in Ottawa (covering Eastern Ontario and Northeastern Ontario)
  - 4th Canadian Division Headquarters, in Toronto
  - 4th Canadian Division Support Group, at CFB Petawawa
  - 2 Military Police Regiment, in Toronto
  - 2 Intelligence Company (Reserve), in Toronto
  - 3rd Canadian Ranger Patrol Group, at CFB Borden
  - 4th Canadian Division Training Centre, in Meaford
  - Ceremonial Guard, in Ottawa
  - Canadian Forces Base Kingston, Kingston

=== 3rd Canadian Ranger Patrol Group ===
3rd Canadian Ranger Patrol Group		CFB Borden
3 Canadian Ranger Patrol Group Headquarters	Regular Support Staff	Borden, Ontario
The Attawapiskat Canadian Ranger Patrol	Canadian Rangers	Attawapiskat, Ontario
The Bearskin Lake Canadian Ranger Patrol	Canadian Rangers	Bearskin Lake, Ontario
The Constance Lake Canadian Ranger Patrol	Canadian Rangers	Constance Lake, Ontario
The Eabametoong Canadian Ranger Patrol	Canadian Rangers	Fort Hope, Ontario
The Fort Albany Canadian Ranger Patrol	Canadian Rangers	Fort Albany, Ontario
The Fort Severn Canadian Ranger Patrol	Canadian Rangers	Fort Severn, Ontario
The Kasabonika Lake Canadian Ranger Patrol	Canadian Rangers	Kasabonika Lake, Ontario
The Kashechewan Canadian Ranger Patrol	Canadian Rangers	Kashechewan, Ontario
The Kingfisher Lake Canadian Ranger Patrol	Canadian Rangers	Kingfisher Lake, Ontario
The Kitchenuhmaykoosib Canadian Ranger Patrol	Canadian Rangers	Big Trout Lake, Ontario
The Lac Seul Canadian Ranger Patrol	Canadian Rangers	Lac Seul, Ontario
The Mishkeegogamang Lake Canadian Ranger Patrol	Canadian Rangers	Mishkeegogamang, Ontario
The Moose Factory Lake Canadian Ranger Patrol	Canadian Rangers	Moose Factory, Ontario
The Muskrat Dam Canadian Ranger Patrol	Canadian Rangers	Muskrat Dam, Ontario
The Neskantaga Canadian Ranger Patrol	Canadian Rangers	Neskantaga, Ontario
The Peawanuck Canadian Ranger Patrol	Canadian Rangers	Peawanuck, Ontario
The Sachigo Lake Canadian Ranger Patrol	Canadian Rangers	Sachigo Lake, Ontario
The Sandy Lake Canadian Ranger Patrol	Canadian Rangers	Sandy Lake, Ontario
The North Caribou Lake Canadian Ranger Patrol	Canadian Rangers	North Caribou Lake, Ontario
The Wapekeka Detachment of the Kitchenuhmaykoosib Canadian Ranger Patrol	Canadian Rangers	Wapekeka, Ontario
The Webequie Canadian Ranger Patrol	Canadian Rangers	Webequie, Ontario
The Wunnumin Lake Detachment of the Kingfisher Lake Canadian Ranger Patrol	Canadian Rangers	Wunnumin Lake, Ontario

== Abbreviations ==
- ASU: Area Support Unit
- CFB: Canadian Forces Base
- RCA: The Royal Regiment of Canadian Artillery
- RCAC: Royal Canadian Armoured Corps
- CFMS: Canadian Forces Medical Service

== Commanders ==
- Brigadier-General C.I. Oberwarth, MSM, CD – 2024 – present
- Brigadier-General J.J. Major, MSM, CD – 2022 – 2024
- Brigadier-General Peter Scott, CD – 2021–2022
- Brigadier-General Conrad Mialkowski, MSM 2019–2021
- Brigadier-General Jocelyn Paul Canadian Forces Organization Orders, MSC, CD – 2018–2019
- Brigadier-General Stephen Cadden CD – 2016–2018
- Brigadier-General Lowell Thomas, CD – 2014–2016
- Brigadier-General Omer Lavoie – 2012–2014
- Brigadier-General Fred Lewis, MSM, CD – 2010–2012
- Brigadier-General Jean-Claude Collin, OMM, CD – 2008–2010
- Brigadier-General John Howard, MSM, CD – 2007–2008
- Brigadier-General Guy Thibault, CD – 2005–2007
- Brigadier-General Greg Young, CD – 2005
- Brigadier-General Marc Lessard, CD – 2003–2005
- Brigadier-General Andrew Leslie, OMM, MSM, CD – 2002–2003
- Brigadier-General Michel Gauthier, CD – 2000–2002
- Colonel Chris Corrigan, CD – 1999–2000
- Brigadier-General Walter Holmes, MBE, MSM, CD – 1998–1999
- Major-General Bryan Stephenson, CD – 1995–1998
- Major-General Brian Vernon, CD – 1993–1995
- Major-General Lewis MacKenzie, CD – 1992–1993
- Major-General Nicholas Hall, CD – 1991–1993

== See also ==
- Razing of Friesoythe
- Christopher Vokes
