= 2nd Dragoons (Canada) =

- Active: 1812-1872 (Independent Cavalry Troops); 1872 - 1936
- Country: Canada
- Branch: Canadian Militia
- Type: Dragoons
- Role: Cavalry
- Size: One Regiment
- Part of: Non-Permanent Active Militia
- Garrison/HQ: Oak Ridges, ON (1872-1892); Saint Catharines, ON (1892-1921); Welland, ON (1921-1936)
- Motto(s): Latin: Pro Rege Et Imperio, lit. 'For King and Empire'
- Engagements: War of 1812; Upper Canada Rebellion; Fenian Raids; South African War; First World War

The 2nd Dragoons was a cavalry regiment of the Non-Permanent Active Militia of the Canadian Militia (now the Canadian Army). In 1936, the regiment was Amalgamated with the 10th Brant Dragoons to form the 2nd/10th Dragoons – today now part of the 57th Field Artillery Regiment (2nd/10th Dragoons), RCA (currently on the Supplementary Order of Battle).

== Lineage ==
- Originated on 10 May 1872, in Oak Ridges, Ontario, as the 2nd Regiment of Cavalry.
- Redesignated on 1 January 1893, as the 2nd Dragoons.
- Amalgamated on 15 December 1936, with the 10th Brant Dragoons and Redesignated as the 2nd/10th Dragoons.

== History ==
=== Early years ===
Prior to the War of 1812, volunteer cavalry troops were founded to support the various infantry regiments formed as part of the sedentary militia of Upper Canada. With the outbreak of war with the United States in 1812, Major-General Isaac Brock organized several troops into an independent corps designated as the Niagara Light Dragoons, which would serve under Brock's command in the Niagara and Detroit campaigns. However, due to it being a volunteer unit that would only serve one year, the light dragoons were disbanded in 1813, and replaced by the Troop of Provincial Dragoons (also known as Merritt's Troop or The Niagara Frontier Guides) under the command of its first commander Captain William Hamilton Merritt (who later helped found the creation of the First Welland Canal). The Troop would remain in action for the remainder of the war, distinguishing itself at the battles of Stoney Creek (1813) and Lundy's Lane (1814). With the end of the war, the Dragoons were disbanded.

Following the War of 1812, these volunteer cavalry units would remain active throughout the British North American colonies, serving during the Upper Canada Rebellion of 1837 against the forces of William Lyon Mackenzie.

With the passing of the Militia Act of 1855, the first of a number of newly raised independent militia cavalry troops and mounted infantry companies were established in and around the Niagara region of Canada West (now the Province of Ontario). A number of these militia cavalry troops would be called out for service during the Fenian Raids of the 1860s.

=== Late 1800’s ===
On 10 May 1872, the 2nd Regiment of Cavalry was authorized for service by the regimentation of eight of these previously authorized independent militia cavalry troops and mounted infantry companies. The regiment was organized and uniformed as a hussar regiment and had its Regimental Headquarters was at Oak Ridges and had troops at St. Catharines, Oak Ridges, Markham, Grimsby, Burford, Queenston and Welland, Ontario.

In 1887, the regiment was reorganized and uniformed as a dragoon regiment and on 17 May 1889, the Oak Ridges and Markham Troops were transferred to The Governor General's Body Guard in Toronto. Around 1892 to the end of the century, the regiment was officially Redesignated as the 2nd Dragoons and the remaining troops were eventually grouped together into 3 squadrons and the Regimental Headquarters was relocated to Saint Catharines.

=== South Africa & The Early 1900’s ===
When the Boer War began in 1899, the regiment provided a volunteer draft of one officer and 15 other ranks for overseas service with the 1st Canadian Mounted Rifles (later The Royal Canadian Dragoons).

Two members of this draft would be killed in action before the war's end:

Lieutenant John Edgar Burch, age 26 and the regimental adjutant was killed in action on 16 July 1900, at the Battle of Witpoort outside the Boer capital of Pretoria.

Trooper Archibald Radcliffe, was killed in action on September 23, 1900, outside of Belfast, South Africa.

In 1909, the regiment's C Squadron was detached to form the nucleus of the newly formed 25th Brant Dragoons and was replaced by a new C Squadron raised in Hamilton along with a newly raised D Squadron in Welland.

=== The Great War ===
On 6 August 1914, Details from the 2nd Dragoons were placed on active service for local protection duties. The regiment's A and D Squadrons were tasked to help guard the Welland Canal, a duty it maintained until 1916.

When the Canadian Expeditionary Force was formed for service overseas, the 2nd Dragoons would provide over a thousand volunteers for numerous CEF units raised for service.

As one of the 4 cavalry regiments of Militia District 2, the 2nd Dragoons along with The Governor General's Body Guard, the 9th Mississauga Horse and the 25th Brant Dragoons would provide detachments to form the newly raised 4th Regiment, Canadian Mounted Rifles for overseas service in the CEF. The regiment was also instrumental in forming the 8th Regiment, Canadian Mounted Rifles (which was later broken up for reinforcements).

Volunteers from the regiment would also help form the 4th Battalion (Central Ontario), CEF; the 75th Battalion (Mississauga), CEF; and the 84th Battalion, CEF. In 1916, the 2nd Dragoons along with 19th Lincoln Regiment would raise the 176th Battalion (Niagara Rangers), CEF for service with one of its officers, Lieutenant-Colonel Donald Sharpe, commanding the battalion. The 176th Battalion was later broken up to reinforce the 3rd Battalion (Toronto Regiment), CEF; and the 75th Battalion (Mississauga), CEF.

By the war's end in 1918, the regiment suffered many casualties.

=== 1920s-1930s ===
After the war, the 2nd Dragoons was one of the few regiments to avoid major changes due to the Otter Commission. In 1921, the regiment was reduced from four squadrons to three and its Regimental Headquarters was moved for the last time to Welland Ontario. During the Great Depression, the authorized strength of the regiment declined to 100 officers and men, forcing many of its members to parade without pay during this period.

On 16 February 1936, as a result of the 1936 Canadian Militia reorganization, the 2nd Dragoons were Amalgamated with the 10th Brant Dragoons to form the 2nd/10th Dragoons.

== Organization ==
=== 2nd Regiment of Cavalry (10 May 1872) ===
- Regimental Headquarters (Oak Ridges, Ontario)
- No. 1 Troop (St. Catharines, Ontario) (first raised on 27 September 1855 as the 1st Volunteer Militia Troop of Cavalry of St. Catharines)
- No. 2 Troop (Oak Ridges, Ontario) (first raised on 27 December 1855 as the 2nd Troop of Volunteer Militia Cavalry of the County of York. Redesignated on 22 December 1865 as the 1st Troop, York Squadron of Volunteer Militia Cavalry. Redesignated on 30 March 1866 as the 1st Troop, 1st Squadron of Volunteer Light Cavalry of the County of York) (Transferred on 17 May 1889 to The Governor General's Body Guard)
- No. 3 Troop (Markham, Ontario) (raised on 15 July 1855 as The Markham Troop of Volunteer Militia Cavalry of the County of York. Redesignated on 22 December 1865 as the 2nd Troop, York Squadron of Volunteer Militia Cavalry. Redesignated on 30 March 1866 as the 2nd Troop, 1st Squadron of Volunteer Light Cavalry of the County of York) (Transferred on 17 May 1889 to The Governor General's Body Guard)
- No. 4 Troop (Grimsby, Ontario) (first raised on 11 December 1856 as the 1st Volunteer Militia Troop of Grimsby)
- No. 5 Troop (Burford, Ontario) (first raised on 7 September 1866) as The Burford Volunteer Militia Troop of Cavalry)
- No. 6 Troop (Queenston, Ontario) (first raised on 31 August 1866 as The Queenston Mounted Infantry Company)
- No. 7 Troop (Barrie, Ontario) (first raised on 19 October 1866 as The Barrie Mounted Infantry Company) (Disbanded on 12 December 1872)
- No. 8 Troop (Port Robinson/Welland County, Ontario) (first raised on 2 May 1862 as The Volunteer Militia Cavalry Troop of the County of Welland)

=== 2nd Dragoons (1 January 1893) ===
- Regimental Headquarters (St. Catharines, Ontario)
- A Squadron (St. Catharines, Ontario)
- B Squadron (Saint Ann's, Ontario)
- C Squadron (Burford, Ontario)

=== 2nd Dragoons (1 April 1909) ===
- Regimental Headquarters (St. Catharines, Ontario)
- A Squadron (St. Catharines, Ontario)
- B Squadron (Saint Ann's, Ontario)
- C Squadron (Hamilton, Ontario)
- D Squadron (Welland, Ontario)

=== 2nd Dragoons (1921) ===
- Regimental Headquarters (Welland, Ontario)
- A Squadron (St. Catharines, Ontario)
- B Squadron (Hamilton, Ontario)
- C Squadron (Welland, Ontario)

== Alliances ==
United Kingdom - The Royal Scots Greys (2nd Dragoons) (Until 1936)

== Notable Members ==
- Lieutenant-Colonel Donald Sharpe
- Lieutenant John Edgar Burch

== See also ==
- List of regiments of cavalry of the Canadian Militia (1900–1920)
