= 2nd/10th Dragoons =

57th Field Artillery Regiment (2nd/10th Dragoons), Royal Canadian Artillery
- Active: 1946–1970
- Country: Canada
- Branch: Canadian Army
- Type: Artillery
- Role: Field artillery
- Size: One regiment
- Part of: Royal Regiment of Canadian Artillery
- Garrison/HQ: Niagara Falls, Ontario
- Mottos: Ubique. (Latin for 'Everywhere'); Quo fas et gloria ducunt (Latin for 'Whither right and glory lead')
- March: Quick: "The British Grenadiers"

The 2nd/10th Dragoons (short-form: 2/10 D) (in its last incarnation, the 57th Field Artillery Regiment [2nd/10th Dragoons], Royal Canadian Artillery or 57 Fd Regt RCA) was a militia regiment of the Canadian Army, based in the Niagara, Wentworth, and Brant regions of southern Ontario. It was formed in 1936 by amalgamating the 2nd and 10th Dragoons, both of which had served previously as cavalry units in the Canadian Militia. After the Second World War the regiment was converted into an anti-aircraft artillery unit. In 1962 the regiment was converted into a field howitzer unit and in 1968, amid a downsizing of the Canadian Armed Forces, the regiment was reduced drastically before eventually being completely disbanded in the mid-1990s. The regiment is currently on the Supplementary Order of Battle.

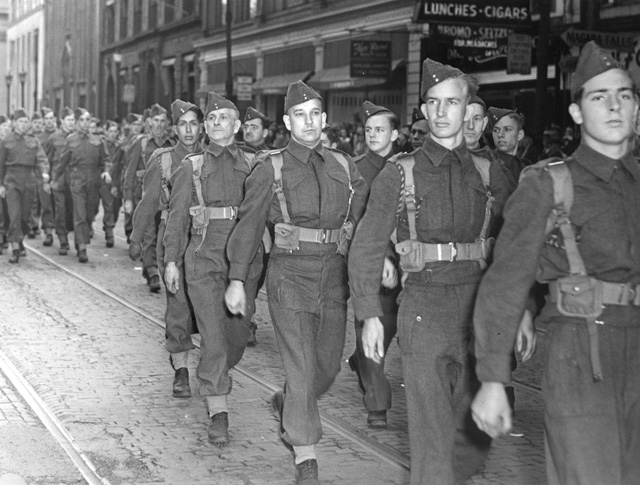
Soldiers of the 2nd/10th Dragoons in June 1942

== History ==
=== 2nd Dragoons ===
2nd Dragoons
- Active: 1872–1936
- Country: Canada
- Branch: Canadian Militia
- Type: Dragoons
- Role: Cavalry
- Size: One regiment
- Part of: Non-Permanent Active Militia
- Garrison/HQ: St. Catharines, Ontario (later moved to Welland)
- Mottos: Pro rege et imperio (Latin for 'for king and empire')
- Engagements: South African War; First World War

In the years prior to the War of 1812, volunteer cavalry troops were founded to support the various infantry regiments formed as part of the sedentary militia (only to be called up in times of war) of Upper Canada (modern-day southern Ontario). On commencement of hostilities against the United States in 1812, Major-General Sir Isaac Brock organized several troops into an independent corps (equivalent to a modern armoured regiment) designated the Niagara Light Dragoons, which fought under Brock's command in the Niagara campaign and the Detroit campaign. Due to it being a volunteer unit that would only have served one year, the Niagara Light Dragoons were disbanded in 1813, replaced by the Troop of Provincial Dragoons (sometimes also called The Niagara Frontier Guides or The Niagara Frontier Guards) under the command of William Hamilton Merritt, the man who later helped drive the creation of the Welland Canal. The troop remained in action for the remainder of the war, distinguishing itself in the Stoney Creek and Lundy's Lane campaigns in 1813 and 1814. At war's termination, the troop was disbanded.

In the wake of the War of 1812, volunteer cavalry units remained active throughout the British North American colonies, serving during the Rebellions of 1837–1838 against the forces of William Lyon Mackenzie and during the Fenian Raids in the late 1860s. It was in the wake of the latter conflict that the leaders of the Canadian Militia decided to establish a regiment of cavalry that would support the infantry units in south-central Ontario. The 2nd Regiment of Cavalry was established on 1 May 1872 as a hussar regiment with eight troops of cavalry based as follows:

- 1 Troop, Saint Catharines
- 2 Troop, Oak Ridges
- 3 Troop, Markham
- 4 Troop, Grimsby
- 5 Troop, Burford
- 6 Troop, Queenston
- 7 Troop, Barrie
- 8 Troop, Welland County

Regimental Headquarters was at Oak Ridges during the early years of the regiment's existence.

The regiment was transformed to dragoon format in 1887, thus acquiring its last name before unification with the 10th Dragoons, the 2nd Dragoons. Two years later, 2 and 3 Troops were placed under the command of the Governor-General's Body Guard in Toronto. 7 Troop was also taken off-strength. 4 Troop shifted from Grimsby to Saint Ann's that same year. The remaining troops then were then made to take letter designations in lieu of numerical ones. Regimental Headquarters was shifted to Saint Catharines in 1892. Finally, near the turn of the century, the five troops were amalgamated into three squadrons, based in Saint Catharines (A Squadron, formed from 1 and 6 Troops), Saint Ann's (B Squadron, formed from 4 and 8 Troops), and Burford (C Squadron, formed from 5 Troop).

When the Boer War began in 1899, the regiment provided a volunteer draft of 16 personnel (one officer and 15 other ranks) for service with the 1st Canadian Mounted Rifles. Two of these, the officer (Lieutenant J.E. Burch) and one of the men (Trooper A. Radcliffe) died during the conflict.

In 1909, C Squadron was detached from the regiment to form the nucleus of the 25th Brant Dragoons (see below), being replaced by a new C Squadron in Hamilton and D Squadron in Welland. During the same year, the regiment received its hat badge (a circlet marked "2nd Dragoons" around the image of Brock's Monument in Queenston) and motto, pro rege et imperio (Latin for 'for king and empire'). The hat badge was also worn in miniature as "collar dogs" on the dress uniform jackets.

At the start of the First World War, the regiment's A and D Squadrons were tasked to help guard the Welland Canal, a duty it maintained until 1916. At the same time, the regiment sent over a thousand volunteers to fight in various elements of the Canadian Corps, including the 4th, 75th and 84th Battalions of the Canadian Expeditionary Force, as well as the 4th and 8th Canadian Mounted Rifles. In 1916, the regiment helped raise a complete battalion for the CEF, the 176th Battalion, which was dispatched to Europe and later disbanded to allow its members to reinforce the 3rd and 75th Battalions. The regiment suffered many casualties throughout the conflict.

After the war, in 1921, the regiment was reorganized into three squadrons: A Squadron (Saint Catharines), B Squadron (Hamilton) and C Squadron (Welland). Regimental Headquarters were also in Welland. Until 1936, when the regiment was amalgamated with the 10th Dragoons, the regiment was authorized for only 100 officers and men, forcing many of its members to parade without pay during this period.

=== 10th Dragoons ===
25th Brant Dragoons (1909–1921); 10th Brant Dragoons
- Active: 1909–1936
- Country: Canada
- Branch: Canadian Militia
- Type: Dragoons
- Role: Cavalry
- Size: One regiment
- Part of: Non-Permanent Active Militia
- Garrison/HQ: Brantford, Ontario
- Mottos: Sagitari, from sagittarii (Latin for 'the bowmen')
- Engagements: First World War

In 1909, C Squadron of the 2nd Dragoons was removed from its parent regiment and redesignated as the heart of the 25th Brant Dragoons, with headquarters shifting to Brantford from Burford. While a squadron was maintained at Burford, new squadrons were formed at Brantford and Paris. A fourth squadron was later formed in Cainsville, but was later shifted to Brantford.

A regimental hat badge was also designed, composed of the head of a Indigenous warrior with full head dress over the scroll "Brant Dragoons" and the number "25", that in all surmounting a bow and a quiver of arrows. The regiment's motto was Sagitari, from sagittarii (Latin for 'the bowmen').

During the First World War, the regiment was never tasked for home guard duties, thus freeing it to dispatch volunteers to fill out the ranks of the 4th, 75th, 84th, 125th, and 215th of the CEF, as well as the 4th and 7th Canadian Mounted Rifles.

In 1921, the regiment received its final pre-unification designation, 10th Brant Dragoons. With squadrons based in Brantford, Paris and Burford, it wore the same hat badge save for a change of number to 10 from 25.

2nd/10th Dragoons
- Active: 1936–1946
- Country: Canada
- Branch: Canadian Militia (1936–1940); Canadian Army (1940–1946)
- Type: Dragoons
- Role: Cavalry; Armoured Reconnaissance
- Size: One regiment
- Part of: Non-Permanent Active Militia (1936–1940); Royal Canadian Armoured Corps (1940–1946)
- Garrison/HQ: Hamilton, ON
- Mottos: Pro rege et imperio (Latin for 'for king and empire'); Sagitari, from sagittarii (Latin for 'the bowmen')
- Engagements: South African War; First World War; Second World War

=== 2nd/10th Dragoons ===
In 1936, as part of wide-sweeping changes in the Canadian Militia at that time, the 2nd Dragoons and the 10th Brant Dragoons were amalgamated into one single regiment, the 2nd/10th Dragoons. The regiment's hat badge was a variation of the 10th's hat badge, with the scroll now marked "Second – Dragoons – Tenth", while a variation of the 2nd's collar badges (with the inscription there now reading "2nd/10th Dragoons") was used as the collar badges of the new regiment, thus allowing the regiment to keep both sagitari and pro rege et imperio as its official mottos. The new regiment's squadrons were based at Saint Catharines, Hamilton and Brantford.

At the start of the Second World War, the regiment was not mobilized for war service right away, thus forcing many of its personnel to seek out other units to serve overseas. Eventually, an Active Force regiment (an infantry battalion) was organized in 1942 as part of the 7th Canadian Infantry Division, serving in the Atlantic region of Canada. The Active unit was disbanded in late 1943 when the need to have home defence troops was seen as no longer necessary. The Reserve regiment remained in place, ready for use when required, parading at nearly full strength for an armoured reconnaissance unit throughout the war period. As this went on, many personnel eventually transferred to the Active Force. Of special note, 151 of the regiment eventually came to serve with the active battalion of the Royal Hamilton Light Infantry and another 206 joined the Royal Canadian Dragoons for overseas service.

=== From cavalry to artillery ===
In the wake of the Second World War, the regiment was, along with other units, completely removed from the list of militia units of the Royal Canadian Armoured Corps and transformed into a light anti-aircraft unit of the Royal Canadian Artillery, taking on the new designation 57th Light Anti-Aircraft Regiment (2nd/10th Dragoons) RCA. Three brand-new batteries of artillery were founded to flesh out the new unit:

- 170th Light Anti-Aircraft Battery, Welland
- 171st Light Anti-Aircraft Battery, Fort Erie
- 172nd Light Anti-Aircraft Battery, Niagara Falls

Regimental Headquarters was in Welland.

The regiment was tasked during these years in several roles, including supporting Canada's civilian response to the Cold War. The regiment became the district headquarters for the Emergency Measures Organization (Civil Defence), which had its equipment garage at the Welland Airport west of the city in Pelham Township, as well as enough emergency food supplies to support 25,000 people. Also during this time, the regiment trained relentlessly in its primary task on using the Bofors 40 millimetre anti-aircraft gun, usually at summer camps held at the Royal Canadian School of Artillery (Anti-Aircraft), at Picton.

=== Final years ===
In 1962, the regiment found itself re-formed yet again into a field artillery regiment (as 57th Field Regiment [2nd/10th Dragoons], RCA), its anti-aircraft guns being replaced by the 105 millimetre C1 Howitzer. Two years later, on the disbandment of the 44th Field Regiment RCA, one of its sub-units, 10th Field Battery, RCA (based in Saint Catharines), was transferred and made part of the 57th Regiment's order of battle. This year also saw the disbandment of the 170th Battery and the shifting of Regimental Headquarters to Niagara Falls to reside alongside the 172nd Battery. Despite the changes, the regiment's officers and men served with great distinction throughout this period, both on the field and in ceremonial parades, sometimes also held alongside the Lincoln and Welland Regiment. Among the latter was the granting of Freedom of the City to the regiment by the city council of Niagara Falls.

In the wake of the unification of the Canadian Forces in 1968, a strong movement got underway to downsize, disband and concentrate units of the Army Reserve to better save up on spending. The regiment fell victim to this process, being reduced to nil strength in the winter of 1970 and transferred to the Supplementary Order of Battle. Only 10th Battery and F Troop of 172nd Battery survived the disbandment, both units being shifted as part of the 56th Field Regiment (Dufferin and Haldimand Rifles of Canada) RCA in Brantford (F Troop becoming part of the 69th Field Battery RCA, based in Simcoe). In 1980, F Troop was shifted to become part of the 10th Battery as B Troop, eventually being disbanded when the Niagara Falls Armoury closed in the mid-1990s.

Lineage chart

1855	Independent cavy troops
1872	2nd Regt of Cavy
1893	2nd Dragoons
1909	25th Brant Dragoons
1920	10th Brant Dragoons
1936	2nd/10th Dragoons
1940	2nd/10th (Reserve) Dragoons
1942	2nd/10th Dragoons, CASF
1942	1st Bn, 2nd/10th Dragoons, CASF
1943	Disbanded
1946	57th Light Anti-Aircraft Regt (2nd/10th Dragoons), RCA
1960	57th Light Anti-Aircraft Arty Regt (2nd/10th Dragoons), RCA
1962	57th Fd Arty Regt (2nd/10th Dragoons), RCA
1970	Supplementary Order of Battle

== Notable members ==
- Donald Sharpe
- Henry Cockshutt
- John Henry Fisher
