= Company (military unit) =

Military unit size designation

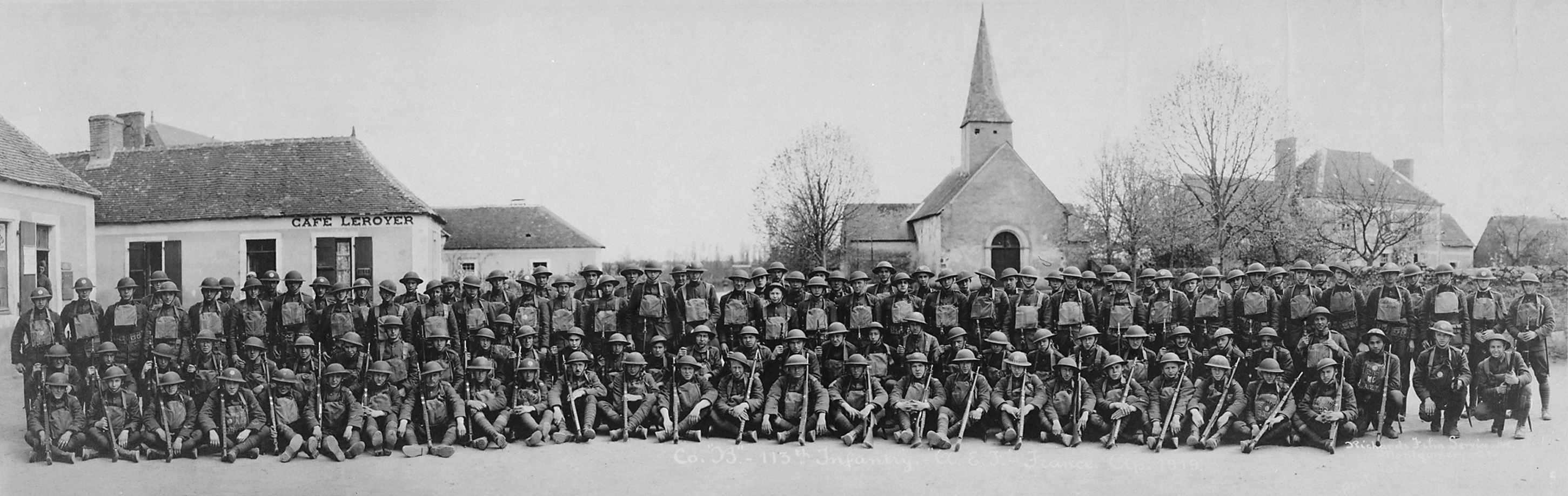
Company B of the 113th Infantry, part of the American Expeditionary Force, France, 1919

A company is a military unit, typically consisting of 100–250 soldiers and usually commanded by a major or a captain. Most companies are made up of three to seven platoons, although the exact number may vary by country, unit type, and structure.

Usually several companies are grouped as a battalion or regiment, the latter of which is sometimes formed by several battalions. Occasionally, independent or separate companies are organized for special purposes, such as the 1st Air Naval Gunfire Liaison Company or the 3rd Force Reconnaissance Company. These companies are not organic to a battalion or regiment, but rather report directly to a higher level organization such as a Marine Expeditionary Force headquarters (i.e., a corps-level command).

== Historical background ==
The word 'company' as an organised unit of soldiers can be traced to at least the 12th Century, in the context of free companies and the later compagnies d'ordonnance.

The modern military company became popularized during the reorganization of the Swedish Army in 1631 under King Gustav II Adolph. For administrative purposes, the infantry was divided into companies consisting of 150 men, grouped into regiments of eight companies. Tactically, the infantry companies were organized into battalions and grouped with cavalry troops and artillery batteries to form brigades.

From ancient times, some armies have commonly used a base administrative and tactical unit of around 100 men. (Perhaps the best known is the Roman century, originally intended as a 100-man unit, but later ranging from about 60 to 80 men, depending on the time period.) An organization based on the decimal number system (i.e., by tens, hundreds, thousands, and ten-thousands) might seem intuitive. To the Romans, for example, a unit of 100 men seemed sufficiently large to efficiently facilitate organizing a large body of men numbering into the several thousands, yet small enough that one man could reasonably expect to command it as a cohesive unit by using his voice and physical presence, supplemented by musical notes (e.g., drum beats, bugle or trumpet blasts, etc.) and visual cues (e.g., colors, standards, guidons, etc.).

Furthermore, recent studies have indicated that humans are best able to maintain stable relationships in a cohesive group numbering between 100 and 250 members, with 150 members being the common number (see Dunbar's number). Again, a military unit on the order of no more than 100 members, and perhaps ideally fewer, would perhaps present the greatest efficiency as well as effectiveness of control, on a battlefield where the stress, danger, fear, noise, confusion, and the general condition known as the "fog of war" would present the greatest challenge to an officer to command a group of men engaged in mortal combat. Until the latter half of the 19th century, when infantry troops still routinely fought in close order, marching and firing shoulder-to-shoulder in lines facing the enemy, the company remained at around 100, or fewer, men.

The advent of accurate, long-range rifle fire, repeating rifles, and machine guns necessitated highly dispersed combat formations. This, coupled with radio communication, permitted relatively small numbers of men to have much greater firepower and combat effectiveness than previously possible. Companies, however, continue to remain within the general range of 100–250 members, perhaps validating the premise that humans fight best (as well as live, work, socialize, play, etc.) in organizations of around 150 members, more or less.

While historically companies were usually grouped into battalions or regiments, there were certain sub-units raised as independent companies that did not belong to a specific battalion or regiment, such as Confederate States of America state local militia companies. However, upon activation and assimilation into the army, several of these independent companies would be grouped together to form either a battalion or a regiment, depending upon the number of companies involved. (Usually two to five would form a battalion, while six to twelve would form a regiment.)

More recent examples of separate companies would be the divisional support companies (i.e., signal, military police, ordinance maintenance, quartermaster, reconnaissance, and replacement companies) of a U.S. Army, Korean War-era infantry division and the divisional aviation company of a U.S. Army "Pentomic" infantry division. These companies were not organic to any intermediate headquarters (viz., battalion/group/regiment/brigade), but rather reported directly to the division headquarters.

== NATO ==
NATO Map Symbols
a friendly company
of unspecified composition
a mechanized
infantry company
a tank company
a towed artillery battery

NATO defines a company as "larger than a platoon, but smaller than a battalion" while being a "unit consisting of two or more platoons, usually of the same type, with a headquarters and a limited capacity for self-support." The standard NATO symbol for a company consists of a single vertical line placed above a framed unit icon. Member nations have stipulated the different names they will use for organizations of this size.

Names for companies in NATO member armed forces
Belgium	Compagnie, escadron, or batterie
Bulgaria	Rota (рота), or batareja (батарея)
Canada	Company, squadron, battery, or flight
Croatia	Satnia, baterija, or sat
Czech Republic	Rota, baterie, or roj
Denmark	Kompagni, eskadron, or batteri
Finland	Komppania, or patteri
France	Compagnie, batterie, or escadron
Germany	Kompanie, Batterie, Staffel, Boot, or Inspektion
Greece	Lochos, pyrovolarchia, or ili
Hungary	Század or üteg
Italy	Compagnia, squadrone, batteria, autoreparto, or complesso minore
Lithuania	Kuopa, baterija, or grandis
Latvia	Rota, baterija, eskadrons
Netherlands	Compagnie, eskadron, or batterij
Norway	Kompani, eskadron, batteri, or stridsgruppe
Poland	Kompania, bateria, or szwadron
Portugal	Companhia, bateria, or esquadrao
Spain	Compañía, batería, escuadrón, or subgrupo táctico
Romania	Companie, baterie, escadron, or grup tactic
Turkey	Bölük or batarya
United Kingdom	Company, squadron, battery, or combat group.
United States	Company, battery, or troop

== British Army ==
Rifle companies consist of three platoons and a company headquarters.

Company-sized organisations in units with a horse-mounted heritage, such as the Household Cavalry, Royal Armoured Corps, Royal Engineers, Royal Corps of Signals, Army Air Corps, Special Air Service, Honourable Artillery Company and Royal Logistic Corps, use the term squadron instead of company, and in the Royal Artillery they are called batteries. Until after the Second World War, the Royal Engineers and Royal Signals had both squadrons and companies depending on whether the units were supporting mounted or foot formations.

The British Army infantry normally identifies its rifle companies by letter (usually, but not always, A, B and C) within a battalion, usually with the addition of a headquarters company and a support/heavy weapons company. Some units name their companies after regimental battle honours; this is commonly the case for composite units, for example the London Regiment with its Somme, Messines and Cambrai companies. The foot guards regiments use traditional names for some of their companies, for example Queen's Company, Left Flank, Prince of Wales's Company etc.

Royal Marines companies are designated by a letter that is unique across the corps, not just within their command. The Intelligence Corps, Royal Military Police and Royal Electrical and Mechanical Engineers all have companies uniquely numbered across their corps.

The defunct Royal Army Service Corps, Royal Pioneer Corps and Royal Army Ordnance Corps had companies; the Royal Corps of Transport had squadrons.

British companies are usually commanded by a major, the officer commanding (OC), with a captain or senior lieutenant as second-in-command (2i/c). The company headquarters also includes a company sergeant major (CSM) normally holding the rank of WO2 and a company quartermaster sergeant (CQMS) of colour sergeant rank, the two most senior soldiers in the company.

The Honourable Artillery Company is in fact a regiment, not a company, in terms of organisation and size.

== Canadian Army ==
In the Canadian Army, the company is the standard sub-unit organization for infantry and combat service support, as modelled after the British. A Canadian infantry battalion consists of three or four rifle companies identified by letter (A Company, B Company, etc.), a Combat Support Company, and an Administration Support Company. A notable exception is The Royal Canadian Regiment, which names its companies sequentially throughout the regiment from the Duke of Edinburgh's Company (instead of A Company) in the 1st Battalion to T Company in the 4th Battalion. Many regiments name their companies after battle honours or former units that make up the current regiment, for example:

- 75th Company, The Toronto Scottish Regiment (Queen Elizabeth the Queen Mother's Own) – commemorating 75th Battalion (Mississauga), CEF
- Victoria Company, The Queen's Own Rifles of Canada – commemorating Queen Victoria
- Grenadier Company, The Royal Regiment of Canada – commemorating the Royal Grenadiers
- No. 2 (Prince of Wales) Company, Canadian Grenadier Guards – commemorating 1st Regiment "Prince of Wales' Fusiliers"

The combat support company administratively contains the specialized platoons, such as reconnaissance, pioneer, headquarters and signals, anti-armour, and mortar. The administration support company contains the support tradesmen that a battalion requires, such as cooks, vehicle technicians, supply, medics, etc.

As in the British Army, company-sized units with a mounted heritage use the term squadron, and in the artillery they are called batteries.

== Soviet/Russian armed forces ==
=== Motorised rifle company ===
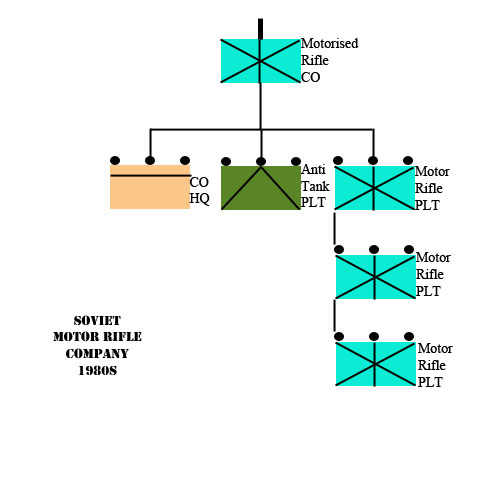
1980s Soviet Motorised Company (BTR)

A Soviet motorised rifle company could be mounted in either BTR armoured personnel carriers or BMP infantry fighting vehicles, with the former being more numerous into the late 1980s. A BTR rifle company consisted of a company headquarters, three motorised rifle platoons and a machine gun/antitank platoon equipped with three PK machine guns and three AT-7 Saxhorn launchers for a total of 110 personnel and 12 BTRs. A BMP rifle company had the same number of personnel and carriers and consisted of a company headquarters, three motorised rifle platoons and a machine gun platoon equipped with six RPK-74s. While seemingly containing less firepower, US commanders were advised to include the BMP's heavier weaponry in their calculations.

=== Tank company ===
Prior to the late 1980s, a Soviet tank company within a Motorised Rifle Regiment consisted of a company headquarters and three tank platoons with T-64, T-72 or T-80 tanks for a total of 39 personnel and 13 tanks; companies using the older T-54, T-55 or T-62s tanks had 13 additional enlisted personnel. Companies within Tank Regiments or independent Tank Battalions had a slightly smaller establishment, having 10 tanks and 30 personnel (40 with older tanks).

=== Research company ===
Research companies (single. nauchnaya rota, научная рота) were established in 2013 to allow conscripts with higher education to serve doing scientific and research tasks. There are seven research companies:

- 2nd and 3rd research company (Aerospace Forces)
- 5th research company (Army)
- 6th research company (General Headquarters)
- 7th research company (Communication)
- 8th research company (Medical)
- 9th research company (Radiation, Chemical, and Biological Defense)

== United States ==
=== Army ===
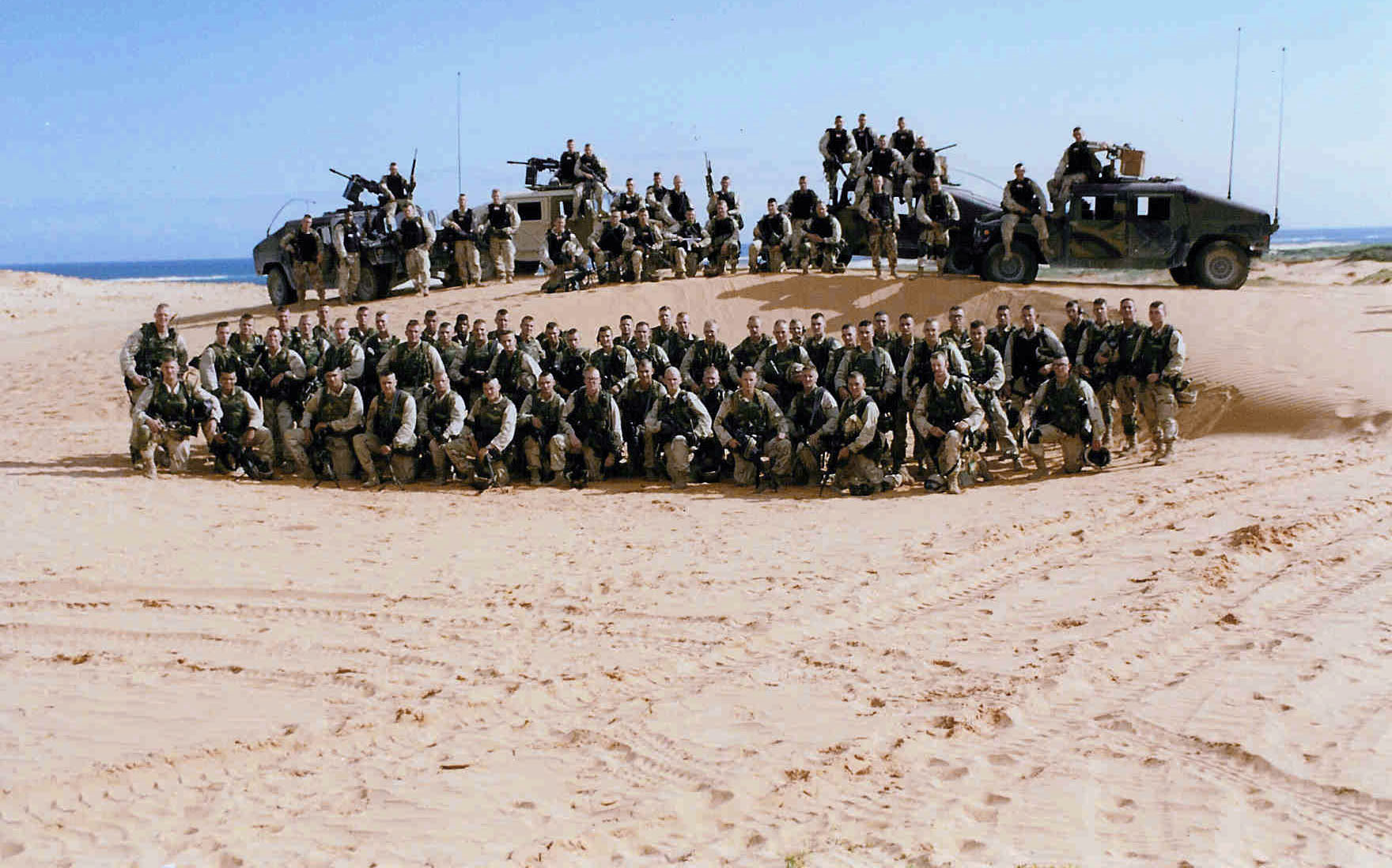
Company B, 3rd Battalion, of the 75th Ranger Regiment in Somalia, 1993.

==== Historical background ====
In the 1700s, British Army, American Colonial Militia, and Provincial Regulars (e.g., the Virginia Regiment), and later American Army infantry, regiments were organized into companies of somewhat less than 100 officers and enlisted men, although the actual totals widely varied. For example, in 1775, a typical British Army infantry company contained only 47 personnel (comprising 3 officers, 5 noncommissioned officers, a drummer, and 38 privates). However, by 1792, an American infantry company contained 98 personnel (comprising 3 officers, 9 noncommissioned officers, a drummer, a fifer, and 84 privates).

Beginning in 1775, American forces began to develop their own organizational doctrine somewhat based on the Franco-Prussian model (with much influence beginning in 1777 from Continental European expatriates and future American generals the Marquis de Lafayette of France, Count Casimir Pulaski of Poland, and Baron von Steuben of Prussia). As a result, in 1776, a Continental Army Infantry company was authorized one captain, one first lieutenant, one second lieutenant (both lieutenants serving as platoon commanders – not designated as platoon leaders until 1943 under the "Triangular Division" reorganization begun in 1939), an ensign (an obsolete subaltern officer rank charged with carrying the regimental colors in rotation with the other ensigns of the battalion/regiment), four sergeants (section leaders/squad leaders with two to a platoon), four corporals (assistant section leaders/squad leaders with two to a platoon), two musicians (a drummer and a fifer), and 76 privates. The company was organized into two platoons, each consisting of two sections/squads (the terms were sometimes used interchangeably) consisting of one sergeant, one corporal, and 19 privates. (Wright, 1983)

From the late 1700s up until the late 1800s, a US infantry company was commanded by a captain and assisted by a first sergeant (first authorized in 1781), and consisted of a small company headquarters and two identical platoons commanded by lieutenants. Even though from 1808 until 1821 companies were authorized two first lieutenants and two second lieutenants (and again from 1861 to 1866 for two second lieutenants), the positions of company executive officer (second-in-command) and a third platoon commander were not authorized until 1898 when the army expanded under mobilization for the war with Spain. During the 1800s the authorized strength of infantry companies fell to a low of 54 officers and men during periods of relative peace from 1821 to 1838 and again from 1842 to 1846. In contrast, from 1812 to 1815 (second war with Great Britain), 1846 to 1848 (war with Mexico), 1861 to 1890 (American civil war and wars with the plains Indians), and 1898–1899 (war with Spain) authorized company strength ranged from over 100 officers and men up to a high of 119. Also, in 1861 a company quartermaster sergeant was added to the authorized manning of an infantry company and a wagoner was reinstituted (previously authorized from 1796 to 1808) to drive the company supply wagon.

During the 1700s and up until the late 1800s, the company was an administrative and tactical unit seldom employed in other than as a massed formation. The standard procedure, once the company had marched into its position in the line of battle, was for the company to form facing the enemy as two ranks, by platoon, one behind the other. The commanding officer (a captain), and the one to four lieutenants (depending upon the time period) serving as platoon commanders/assistant platoon commanders (1808 to 1821) and the executive officer would direct the fighting, leading from the front in the attack and on the flanks in the defense. The executive officer, or more usually the junior lieutenant, and the first sergeant were normally positioned behind the battle line so as to assist the company commander in overseeing the company and managing the rear (company trains with the quartermaster sergeant and wagoner, casualties, enemy prisoners, non-combatants, deserters, etc.). The sergeants, acted as "file closers", working the line by putting men forward to replace casualties in the front rank, encouraging men to fire, reload, move forward, etc. and if need be, physically assisting or restraining men who refused to move forward or attempted to flee. The corporals physically led by example (much like modern fire team leaders) by taking their place in the line with their privates and fighting alongside them.

The ensign, the junior officer in the company from 1775 until 1808 and nominally the "color bearer", usually either personally carried the regimental battle flag or supervised the detailed party of NCOs and privates drawn from the companies tasked with bearing and protecting the flag. The rank and position of ensign (as well as cornet in mounted units) was eliminated in the early 1800s when incumbents were converted to second lieutenants. It had already become the custom to assign a veteran sergeant to carry the national colors as only regiments and separate battalions were authorized to carry a "battle flag". A special group of NCOs, led by the "color sergeant", chosen for their experience and fighting skills, were detailed from the companies to the regimental headquarters to carry and defend the national colors (the United States flag) and the regimental colors (the regiment's unique standard bearing its branch and regiment designation as well as its battle honors and unit decorations).

The musicians remained with the commanding officer to relay orders by sound (i.e., musical notes and drumbeats). Sometimes, the regimental commander would group the musicians as a regimental band positioned behind the left center company in the line of battle, with the drummers forming a regimental drum-line for use by the regimental commander in giving orders to the several companies by drumbeats. As needed, the musicians also served as orderlies and guards at either the company or battalion/regimental headquarters and in combat served as messengers, water carriers, stretcher bearers, and temporarily guarded enemy prisoners of war until they were passed to the rear for processing and internment.

In 1898, with the expansion of the rifle company to three platoons under mobilization for the Spanish–American War, the company gained two officers (an additional first lieutenant as executive officer and an additional second lieutenant to command the third platoon). Additionally, there was an increase in the number of noncommissioned officers (NCOs) to serve as section leaders (sergeants) and squad leaders (corporals) to the point that in 1901 with the increase in privates to 127 (from 84 in 1898) that there were then authorized 18 corporals and six sergeants, along with two buglers (the bugle having replaced both the drum and the fife in infantry companies), the wagoner, two senior NCOs (first sergeant and quartermaster sergeant), and five officers for a total of 161 officers and men. In 1905, a mess sergeant was added to the company's senior NCO staff and the company quartermaster sergeant was renamed supply sergeant.

Due to mobilization for World War I, the army adopted its "square division" organization structure, significantly increasing unit sizes from platoon up. In 1917, a fourth platoon was added to the company, increasing its size to 256 officers and men, including six officers (a captain as commanding officer, a first lieutenant as executive officer, and two first lieutenants and two second lieutenants as platoon commanders). Enlisted strength became: three senior NCOs (first sergeant, supply sergeant, and mess sergeant), 12 sergeants, 33 corporals (one company clerk and 32 squad leaders with eight per platoon), eight specialists (four cooks and four mechanics), two buglers, 64 privates first class, and 128 privates. Of the 12 sergeants, while eight of them continued to serve as section leaders (with two in each platoon), the four senior ranking sergeants were assigned to a new position in each platoon headquarters as "assistant to platoon commander". This was the forerunner of the modern platoon sergeant slot created in 1943 (originally known in 1940 as the "platoon leader", as the officer was styled as the "platoon commander" until 1943) to provide an experienced senior NCO as an advisor and second-in-command to the officer commanding the platoon.

Cavalry companies (not officially re-designated as "troops" until 1883) had a similar organization to the infantry, but with fewer men, companies rarely exceeding around 70 men. In the Field Artillery, the company-equivalent unit is designated as a "battery" and historically consisted of a battery headquarters and two or three gun platoons, each with two gun sections. At full authorized strength, a typical battery of six gun sections would consist of approximately 100 officers and enlisted men.

==== Modern use ====
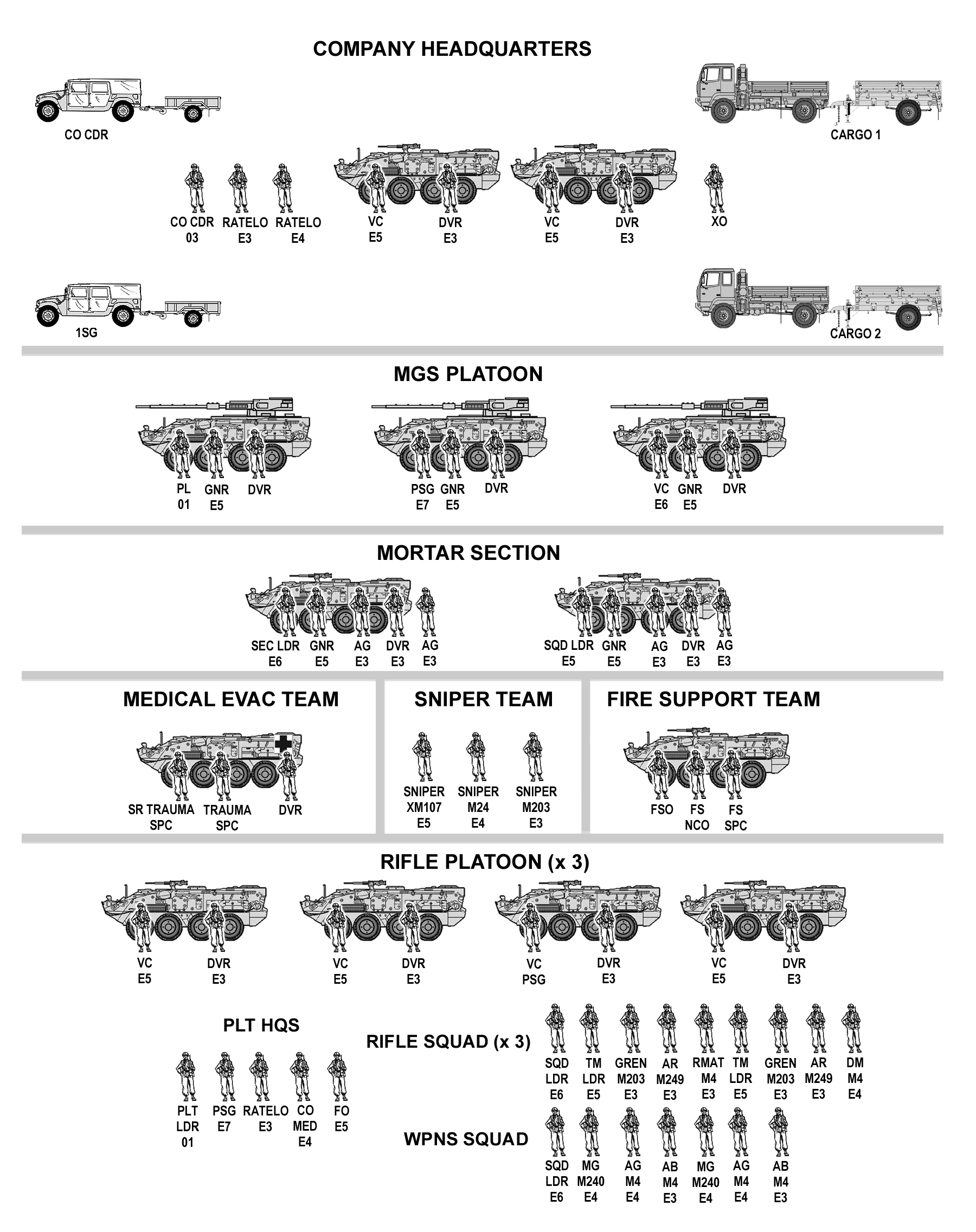
Stryker BCT Rifle Company, 2010.

In the United States Army, infantry companies are usually made up of three rifle platoons and a heavy weapons platoon; mechanized infantry companies are usually made up of three rifle platoons consisting of four infantry fighting vehicles (IFV) each and a command element containing two IFVs; tank companies are usually made up of three tank platoons consisting of four tanks each and a command element containing two tanks; support companies are typically divided into platoons of specialization that may contain additional special sections. A company is usually commanded by a captain, although in some cases they may be commanded by a first lieutenant or a major. Unlike its component platoons, a company typically has additional positions of supporting staff, such as an executive officer (XO), a first sergeant, a readiness/training NCO, and other positions (e.g., supply sergeant, armorer). The corresponding unit of artillery is always called a battery. Similarly, the term troop is used for cavalry units, including both the horse-mounted units of history as well as modern armored cavalry and air cavalry units.

Companies that are not separate from their parent battalion are identified by letter—for example, "Company A, 1st Battalion, 15th Infantry Regiment". This would commonly be abbreviated as "A/1-15 INF" in writing, but not in speaking. The dash in "1–15" indicates that the unit's history stems from the 15th Infantry Regiment of the Army, in its lineage. Companies normally do not have their own overhead, but share the overhead of the parent organization. When the regimental headquarters exists as a separate echelon of command (e.g., the 75th Ranger Regiment, the 11th Armored Cavalry Regiment, and the 1st Marine Regiment), as virtually all U.S. Army regiments did until after the Korean War, a slash separates the battalion/squadron number from the regimental number (i.e., B/2/75 Ranger, C/3/11 ACR, E/2/1 Marines).

Although not official designations, the letters are often pronounced in "GI slang" using the NATO phonetic alphabet or, before that, the Joint Army/Navy Phonetic Alphabet, resulting in names such as "Bravo Company" and "Echo Company" (formerly "Baker" and "Easy" companies, respectively). Companies with a separate table of organization and equipment (TO&E) are identified by a number, and are able to operate completely independently from any other unit's support. Company-sized units that are organized under a table of distribution and allowance (TDA) are identified with a name or number.

Company-sized units usually consist of four to six platoons each led by a lieutenant, although there are examples of combat service and combat service support companies that have seven or more platoons. For example, a transportation terminal service company normally has two ship platoons, two shore platoons, one documentation platoon, one maintenance platoon, and the headquarters platoon.

While companies are typically commanded by captains, some have a special operational capacity that requires them to be commanded by an officer with greater command authority and experience; such companies are commanded by majors, and have platoons commanded by captains. Examples of this arrangement include aviation platoons, military intelligence companies, military police companies, and special forces companies. A captain reports to his commander, usually the battalion commander (a lieutenant colonel). However, there are some administrative and other duties at battalion level and larger (brigade or division) that are also handled by captains, for example the S-1, S-2, & S-4 officers of a battalion (S-3 is a major), or some assistant staff positions in the G shops at division.

The senior non-commissioned officer of a company is called a first sergeant. Any sergeant holding this position is referred to as "first sergeant" regardless of actual rank, though the non-commissioned officer assigned ordinarily has the rank of first sergeant. A master sergeant assigned to this position will be "laterally promoted" to the rank of first sergeant, unless the appointment is temporary. In some instances, a sergeant first class will be appointed to the job in lieu of a rank-qualified first sergeant or master sergeant. Again, in such situations, the NCO holds the duty position and title of "First Sergeant", while retaining the rank of sergeant first class.

=== Marine Corps ===
Rifle Company

- Company Headquarters
  - Company Commander (Commanding Officer/CO) – Captain (O-3)
  - Executive Officer (XO) – usually a First Lieutenant (O-2)
  - First Sergeant (1stSgt, E-8)
  - Gunnery Sergeant (GySgt, E-7)
  - Property NCO (Sgt, E-5)
  - Messenger/Driver (Pvt-LCpl, E-1/3)
- Rifle Platoon (3)
  - Platoon Headquarters
    - Platoon Commander – Lieutenant (O-1/2)
    - Platoon Sergeant – Staff Sergeant (E-6)
    - Platoon Guide – Sergeant (E-5)
    - Messenger – (Pvt-LCpl, E-1/3)
  - Rifle Squad (3)
    - Squad Leader – Sergeant (E-5)
    - Fire Team (3)
      - Team Leader/Grenadier – Corporal (E-4)
      - Automatic Rifleman – Lance Corporal (E-3)
      - Assistant Automatic Rifleman – (Pvt-LCpl, E-1/3)
      - Rifleman/Scout – (Pvt-LCpl, E-1/3)
- Weapons Platoon
  - Platoon Headquarters
    - Platoon Commander – usually a First Lieutenant (O-2)
    - Platoon Sergeant – Gunnery Sergeant (E-7)
  - Machine Gun Section (6 – M240G 7.62mm general-purpose machine guns)
    - Section Leader – Staff Sergeant (E-6)
    - Machine Gun Squad (3)
      - Squad Leader – Sergeant (E-5)
      - Machine Gun Team (2)
        - Team Leader – Corporal (E-4)
        - Gunner – Lance Corporal (E-3)
        - Ammunition Man – (Pvt-LCpl, E-1/3)
  - LWCMS Mortar Section (3 – M224 60mm Light Weight Company Mortar Systems)
    - Section Leader – Staff Sergeant (E-6)
    - Mortar Squad (3)
      - Squad Leader/Gunner – Corporal (E-4)
      - Assistant Gunner – Lance Corporal (E-3)
      - Ammunition Man (2) – (Pvt-LCpl, E-1/3)
  - Assault Section (6 – Mk153 SMAW Shoulder-launched Multipurpose Assault Weapon launchers)
    - Section Leader – Sergeant (E-5)
    - Assault Squad (3)
      - Squad Leader/Team Leader/Gunner – Corporal (E-4)
      - Team Leader/Gunner – Lance Corporal (E-3)
      - Assistant Gunner (2) – (Pvt-LCpl, E-1/3)
- Attachments (notional, dependent upon mission and availability)
  - Company Medical Team from Medical Platoon, Headquarters and Service Company, Infantry Battalion
  - Forward Observer from Fire Direction Center, 81mm Mortar Platoon, Weapons Company, Infantry battalion
  - Forward Air Control Party from S-3 Section and Communications Platoon, Headquarters and Service Company, Infantry Battalion
  - Forward Observer Team from the Battalion's Direct Support 155mm Howitzer Battery, Artillery Battalion
  - Dining Facility Team from Dining Facility Section, Service Platoon, Headquarters and Service Company, Infantry Battalion
  - Heavy Machine Gun Squad/Section (M2HB .50 cal. BMG and/or Mk 19 40mm AGL) from Heavy Machine Gun Platoon, Weapons Company, Infantry Battalion
  - Javelin Squad (4 – FGM-148 Javelin Anti-Tank Missile launchers) from Javelin Section, Antiarmor Platoon, Weapons Company, Infantry Battalion
  - Antitank (TOW) Squad (2 – BGM-71 Tube launched, Optically tracked, Wire command link guided missile launchers) from Antitank (TOW) Section, Antiarmor Platoon, Weapons Company, Infantry Battalion
  - Amphibious Assault Vehicle (AAV) Platoon (12 – AAV-7 Amphibious Assault Vehicles) from the Battalion's Direct Support AAV Company/Battalion
  - Tank Section/Platoon (2/4 M1A2 Main Battle Tanks) from the Battalion's Direct Support Tank Company/Battalion
  - Light Armored Reconnaissance (LAR) Platoon (4 LAV-25 Light Armored Reconnaissance Vehicles) from the Battalion's Direct Support LAR Company/Battalion
  - Other Ground Combat Element assets as required (e.g., Scout Sniper, Reconnaissance, Combat Engineer, etc.)

Weapons company

A weapons company has in place of the three rifle platoons, an 81 mm mortar platoon, an anti-armor platoon, and a heavy machine gun platoon.

Headquarters and Service Company

- Headquarters Platoon consists of Marines from S-1, S-2, S-3, the Nuclear, Biological, Chemical Defense section, and the Chaplain section (one Navy chaplain and an enlisted religious program specialist).
- Communications Platoon, consisting of Radiomen, Wiremen, Techs, Data Marines, and the associated staff.
- Service Platoon, consisting of S-4, Motor Transportation, Food Service, armorers, and Supply.
- Scout Sniper Platoon.
- Medical Platoon, which includes all of the Navy medical personnel for the rifle companies and the Battalion Aid Station (BAS). The allowance of 65 hospital corpsmen and two Medical Corps officers (doctors) is usually not completely staffed. As such, the BAS usually fields one doctor and 10–12 hospital corpsmen. The remaining personnel are assigned to the rifle companies, usually five hospital corpsmen per company.

Tank and Light Armored Reconnaissance (LAR) companies

USMC tank and LAR companies are organized similarly to US Army tank and mechanized infantry companies, with the three line platoons consisting of four tanks or LAVs each, and the company command element containing two tanks or LAVs.

Assault Amphibian Vehicle (AAV) companies

AAV companies have three platoons containing four sections of three AAVs each, for a total of 12 AAVs per platoon, and a headquarters section of three AAVs. The company also includes both command and recovery variants of the AAV, giving the company a grand total of approximately 42–45 AAVs.

== Notable examples ==
Some companies were well enough known that they have been identified with their company letter. Examples include:

- Easy Company of the 506th Parachute Infantry Regiment, 101st Airborne Division, which became the focus of the BBC/HBO miniseries Band of Brothers.
- Able Company of the 116th Infantry Regiment, 29th Infantry Division, which landed at Dog Green Sector on Omaha Beach during the Normandy landings and suffered 96% casualties.

== See also ==
- Military organization
- Infantry of the British Army
