= Donald Sharp =

Donald or Don Sharp or Sharpe may refer to:

- Donald Sharpe (1875–1966), Canadian politician in Ontario
- Don Sharp (1921–2011), Australian-born British film director
- Don Sharpe (1929–2004), British sound editor
- Don Sharp (golfer), in the Lake Macquarie Amateur
- Don Sharpe (producer), producer of the 1969 Japanese film Latitude Zero
- Don Sharp (karateka), of the Japan Karate Association
