= Lincoln Regiment =

The Lincoln Regiment
- Active: 1863-1936
- Country: Canada
- Branch: Canadian Militia
- Type: Line Infantry
- Role: Infantry
- Size: One Regiment
- Part of: Non-Permanent Active Militia
- Garrison/HQ: St. Catharines, Ontario
- Engagements: Fenian Raids; First World War
- Battle honours: See #Battle honours

The Lincoln Regiment was an infantry regiment of the Non-Permanent Active Militia of the Canadian Militia (now the Canadian Army). In 1936, the regiment was Amalgamated with The Lincoln and Welland Regiment to form a new regiment also named The Lincoln and Welland Regiment.

== Lineage ==
=== The Lincoln Regiment ===
- Originated on 18 March 1863, in St. Catharines, Ontario, as the "19th Battalion Volunteer Militia (Infantry) Canada".
- Redesignated on 28 September 1866, as the "19th Lincoln Battalion of Infantry".
- Redesignated on 1 October 1897, as the "19th St. Catharines Battalion of Infantry".
- Redesignated on 8 May 1900, as the "19th St. Catharines Regiment".
- Redesignated on 2 November 1912, as the "19th Lincoln Regiment".
- Redesignated on 1 May 1920, as "The Lincoln Regiment".
- Amalgamated on 15 December 1936, with the Lincoln and Welland Regiment and redesignated as "The Lincoln and Welland Regiment".

== Perpetuations ==
- 81st Battalion, CEF
- 176th Battalion (Niagara Rangers), CEF

== History ==
=== Early history ===
With the passing of the Militia Act of 1855, the first of a number of newly-raised independent militia companies were established in and around the Lincoln County region of Canada West (now the Province of Ontario).

On 18 March 1863, the 19th Battalion Volunteer Militia (Infantry) Canada was authorized was authorized for service by the regimentation of eleven of these previously authorized independent militia rifle and infantry companies. Its regimental headquarters was at St. Catharines and had companies at Niagara, Clifton, St. Catharines, Thorold, Louth, Beamsville, Clinton and St. Ann's, Ontario.

=== Fenian Raids ===
On 1 June 1866, the 19th Battalion Volunteer Militia (Infantry) Canada was called out for active service where it served on the Niagara frontier. On 22 June 1866, the battalion was removed from active service.

On 24 May 1870, the 19th Lincoln Battalion of Infantry was called out again for active service on the Niagara frontier. On 3 June 1870, the battalion was removed from active service.

=== First World War ===
On 6 August 1914, the 19th Lincoln Regiment was placed on active service for local protection duties with the Welland Canal Force.

When the Canadian Expeditionary Force was raised in September 1914, the 19th Lincoln Regiment as a unit was not mobilized for active service overseas, but the regiment did contribute drafts to help raise the 4th Battalion (Central Ontario), CEF, as part of the First Canadian Contingent (later the 1st Canadian Division).

On 10 July 1915, the 81st Battalion, CEF, was authorized for service and on 28 April 1916, the battalion embarked for Great Britain. After its arrival in the UK, the battalion provided reinforcements to the Canadian Corps in the field. On 6 July 1916, the battalion's personnel were absorbed by the 35th Reserve Battalion, CEF. On 27 July 1917, the 81st Battalion was disbanded.

On 15 July 1916, the 176th Battalion (Niagara Rangers), CEF, was authorized for service and on 29 April 1917, the battalion embarked for Great Britain. After its arrival in the UK, on 9 May 1917, the battalion's personnel were absorbed by the 12th Reserve Battalion, CEF, to provide reinforcements to the Canadian Corps in the field. On 30 August 1920, the 176th Battalion was disbanded.

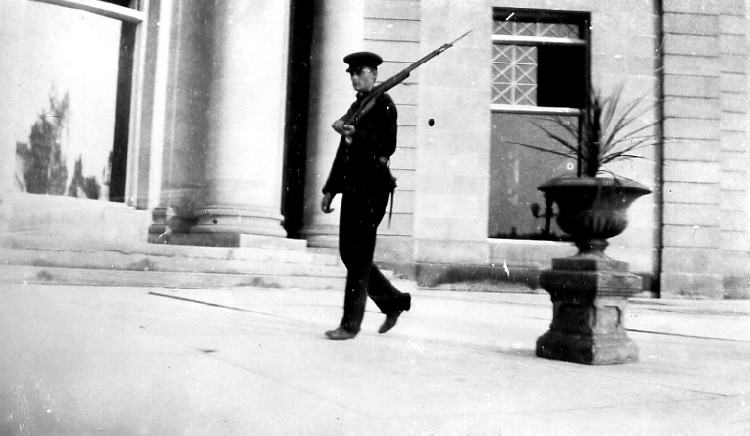
A soldier from the 19th Lincoln Regiment on guard at the Toronto Power Generating Station in 1914

=== 1920s–1930s ===
On 1 May 1920, as a result of the Otter Commission and the following post-war reorganization of the militia, the 19th Lincoln Regiment was redesignated as "The Lincoln Regiment" and was reorganized with two battalions (one of them a paper-only reserve battalion) to perpetuate the assigned war-raised battalions of the Canadian Expeditionary Force.

As a result of the 1936 Canadian Militia reorganization, on 15 December 1936, the Lincoln Regiment was amalgamated with the Lincoln and Welland Regiment to form the current regiment also known as "The Lincoln and Welland Regiment".

== Organization ==
=== 19th Battalion Volunteer Militia (Infantry) Canada (18 March 1863) ===
- Regimental Headquarters (St. Catharines, Ontario)
- No. 1 Company (Niagara) (first raised on 26 December 1862 as the Volunteer Militia Infantry Company of Niagara)
- No. 2 Company (Clifton) (first raised on 9 January 1863 as the Volunteer Militia Infantry Company of Clifton)
- No. 3 Company (St. Catharines) (first raised on 8 August 1862 as the 2nd Volunteer Militia Rifle Company of St. Catharines)
- No. 4 Company (St. Catharines) (first raised on 9 January 1863 as the Volunteer Militia Infantry Company of St. Catharines; later disbanded on 28 September 1865)
- No. 5 Company (Thorold) (first raised on 19 December 1862 as the Volunteer Militia Infantry Company of Thorold; later disbanded by March 1866)
- No. 6 Company (Louth) (first raised on 2 January 1863 as the Volunteer Militia Rifle Company of Louth; later disbanded on 15 December 1865)
- No. 7 Company (Port Dalhousie) (first raised on 30 January 1863 as the Volunteer Militia Infantry Company of Port Dalhousie)
- No. 8 Company (Beamsville) (first raised on 6 February 1863 as the Volunteer Militia Infantry Company of Beamsville)
- No. 9 Company (Clinton) (first raised on 30 January 1863 the as Volunteer Militia Infantry Company of Clinton)
- No. 10 Company (St. Ann's) (first raised on 6 February 1863 as Volunteer Militia Infantry Company of St. Ann's)
- No. 11 Company (Virgil) (first raised on 22 June 1866 as the Volunteer Militia Infantry Company of Virgil)

=== 19th Lincoln Battalion of Infantry (28 September 1866) ===
Formed by the amalgamation of the 19th Battalion Volunteer Militia (Infantry) Canada and the 20th Battalion Volunteer Militia (Infantry) Canada.

- Regimental Headquarters (St. Catharines, Ontario)
- No. 1 Company (Niagara) (former No. 1 Company, 19th Battalion)
- No. 2 Company (St. Catharines) (redesignation of No. 1 Company, 20th Battalion)
- No. 3 Company (St. Catharines) (former No. 3 Company, 19th Battalion)
- No. 4 Company (Beamsville) (redesignation of No. 8 Company, 19th Battalion)
- No. 5 Company (Thorold) (redesignation of No. 3 Company, 20th Battalion; later transferred on 16 November 1866 as No. 2 Company, 44th Battalion)
- No. 6 Company (Grimsby) (redesignation of No. 4 Company, 20th Battalion)
- No. 7 Company (Grimsby) (redesignation of No. 5 Company, 20th Battalion)
- No. 8 Company (St. Ann's) (redesignation of No. 10 Company, 19th Battalion)
- No. 9 Company (Port Dalhousie) (redesignation of No. 6 Company, 20th Battalion)
- No. 10 Company (Clifton) (redesignation of No. 2 Company, 19th Battalion; later transferred on 16 November 1866 as No. 1 Company, 44th Battalion)
- No. 11 Company (Virgil) (former No. 11 Company, 19th Battalion)
- No. 12 Company (Clinton) (redesignation of No. 9 Company, 19th Battalion)

=== 19th Lincoln Battalion of Infantry (16 November 1866) ===
No. 5 Company and No. 10 Company detached to form the 44th Welland Battalion of Infantry, and remaining companies renumbered

- No. 1 Company (Niagara)
- No. 2 Company (St. Catharines)
- No. 3 Company (St. Catharines)
- No. 4 Company (Beamsville; later transferred 1 October 1897 as No. 2 Company, 44th Battalion)
- No. 5 Company (Clinton) (redesignation of No. 9 Company; later disbanded by 1871)
- No. 6 Company (Grimsby) (disbanded by 1871)
- No. 7 Company (Grimsby) (later amalgamated on 22 March 1867 with No. 6 Company)
- No. 8 Company (St. Ann's) (later redesignated on 5 January 1871 as No. 5 Company; moved on 19 June 1874 to St. Catharines)
- No. 9 Company (Port Dalhousie) (later redesignated in 1871 as No. 7 Company; later disbanded by 1897)
- No. 10 Company (Virgil) (redesignation of No. 11 Company; later redesignated on 5 January 1871 as No. 6 Company; later transferred on 1 October 1897 as No. 6 Company, 44th Battalion)

=== 19th St. Catharines Battalion of Infantry (01 October, 1897) ===
- Regimental Headquarters (St. Catharines, Ontario)
- A Company (redesignation of No. 2 Company)
- B Company (redesignation of No. 3 Company)
- C Company (redesignation of No. 5 Company)
- D Company (redesignation of No. 1 Company, moved from Niagara on 1 November 1897)

=== 19th St. Catharines Regiment (01 April, 1908) ===
- A Company
- B Company
- C Company
- D Company
- E Company (St. Catharines, Ontario) (raised on 1 April 1908)
- F Company (St. Catharines, Ontario) (raised on 1 April 1908)
- G Company (St. Catharines, Ontario) (raised on 1 April 1910)
- H Company (St. Catharines, Ontario) (raised on 1 April 1910)

=== The Lincoln Regiment (01 October, 1920) ===
- Regimental Headquarters (St. Catharines, Ontario)
- 1st Battalion (perpetuating the 81st Battalion, CEF)
  - A Company (St. Catharines, Ontario)
  - B Company (St. Catharines, Ontario)
  - C Company (St. Catharines, Ontario)
  - D Company (St. Catharines, Ontario)
- 2nd (Reserve) Battalion (perpetuating the 176th Battalion, CEF)

== Alliances ==
- United Kingdom—The Lincolnshire Regiment (1912-1936)
- Australia—9th/49th Battalion (Until 1936)

== Battle honours ==
- Somme, 1916 (Note: Selected to be borne on colours and appointments)
- Arras, 1917, '18
- Hill 70
- Ypres, 1917
- Amiens
- Hindenburg Line
- Pursuit to Mons

== Notable members ==
- Colonel Sir Daniel Hunter McMillan KCMG
- Major-General Sir Frederick William Benson, KCB
