= 10th Brant Dragoons =

25th Brant Dragoons (1909-1921) 10th Brant Dragoons
- Active: 1909–1936
- Country: Canada
- Branch: Canadian Militia
- Type: Dragoons
- Role: Cavalry
- Size: One regiment
- Part of: Non-Permanent Active Militia
- Garrison/HQ: Brantford, Ontario
- Mottos: Sagitari (from Latin sagittarii, literally "The Bowmen")
- Engagements: First World War

The 10th Brant Dragoons was a cavalry regiment of the Non-Permanent Active Militia of the Canadian Militia (now the Canadian Army). First raised in 1909 as the 25th Brant Dragoons, the regiment was redesignated in 1921 as the 10th Brant Dragoons. In 1936, the regiment was amalgamated with the 2nd Dragoons to form the 2nd/10th Dragoons – now part of the 57th Field Artillery Regiment (2nd/10th Dragoons), RCA (currently on the Supplementary Order of Battle).

== Lineage ==
=== 10th Brant Dragoons ===
- Originated on 1 April 1909, in Brantford, Ontario, as the 25th Brant Dragoons.
- Redesignated on 15 March 1920, as the 10th Brant Dragoons.
- Amalgamated on 15 December 1936, with the 2nd Dragoons and redesignated as the 2nd/10th Dragoons.

== Alliances ==
- United Kingdom - 6th (Inniskilling) Dragoons (Until 1922)
- United Kingdom - 5th Royal Inniskilling Dragoon Guards (1922–1936)

== Notable members ==
- Lieutenant-Colonel Henry Cockshutt
- Colonel John Henry Fisher
