= 98th Battalion (Lincoln & Welland), CEF =

The 98th Battalion (Lincoln & Welland), CEF, was an infantry battalion of the Great War Canadian Expeditionary Force. The 98th Battalion was authorized on 22 December 1915 and embarked for Britain on 16 July 1916, where the battalion provided reinforcements to the Canadian Corps in the field until 6 October 1916, when its personnel were absorbed by the 12th Reserve Battalion, CEF. The battalion disbanded on 17 July 1917.

The 98th Battalion recruited in Lincoln and Welland Counties and was mobilized at Welland, Ontario.

The 98th Battalion was commanded by Lt.-Col. H.A. Rose from 8 July 1916 to 6 October 1916.

The 98th Battalion was awarded the battle honour THE GREAT WAR 1916.

The 98th Battalion (Lincoln & Welland), CEF, is perpetuated by The Lincoln and Welland Regiment.

== Sources ==
Canadian Expeditionary Force 1914–1919 by Col. G.W.L. Nicholson, CD, Queen's Printer, Ottawa, Ontario, 1962
