= Willoughby Township, Ontario =

Willoughby
- Unincorporated community
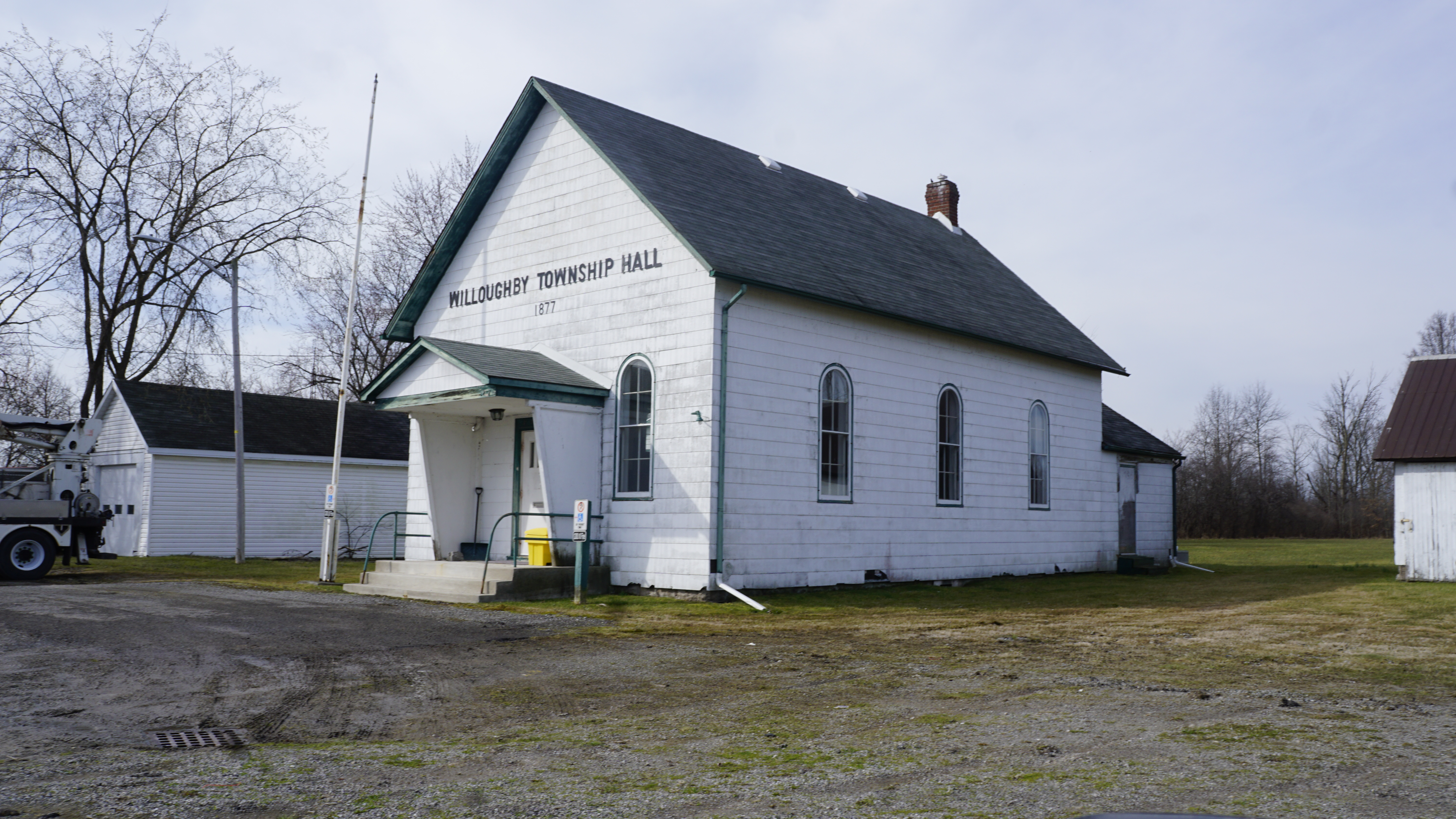
- Willoughby Township Hall
- Interactive map of Willoughby
- Coordinates: 43°0′39″N 79°4′38″W
- Country: Canada
- Province: Ontario
- Regional municipality: Niagara
- City: Niagara Falls
- Settled: 1770s
- Time zone: UTC-5 (EST)
  - Summer (DST): UTC-4 (EDT)
- Forward sortation area: L??
- Area codes: 905 and 289
- NTS Map: 030L14
- GNBC Code: FDTRA

Willoughby Township is the rural southern portion of Niagara Falls, Ontario, between the village of Chippawa and the boundary with Fort Erie. Included is historic Navy Island in the Niagara River and the site of the Battle of Chippawa, fought between British and American forces on July 5, 1814. In 1970, most of the township merged with the city of Niagara Falls with the creation of the Regional Municipality of Niagara, ending county government in Niagara.

European settlement began in the 1770s and 1780s, with Willoughby mostly uncleared and covered in thick forests and marshes. These first settlers were United Empire Loyalists escaping the American Revolution. More groups of pacifist Pennsylvania Dutch families arrived in the 1790s. The 19th century saw increasing settlement, mainly by German-speaking farmers from Alsace-Lorraine, Switzerland, and other German regions attracted by cheap land as well as freedom seekers travelling the Underground Railroad to escape slavery in the United States. Today settler's names continue to dot the township's roads and cemeteries. The Willoughby Township Hall opened in 1877 and is still used for community events and meetings.

The Willoughby Historical Museum has displayed the township's history since 1968 in a former school house along the riverside Niagara Parkway, three miles south of Chippawa. The Niagara Falls Museums operates this site as an organization dedicated to the area's unique history.
