= 84th Battalion, CEF =

Canadian battalion

The 84th Battalion, CEF was a battalion of the First World War Canadian Expeditionary Force. The battalion was authorized on 10 July 1915 and embarked for Great Britain on 18 June 1916. There, on 30 June 1916, its personnel were absorbed by the 73rd Battalion (Royal Highlanders of Canada), CEF, 75th Battalion (Mississauga), CEF and other units of the 4th Canadian Division, to provide reinforcements for the Canadian Corps in the field. The battalion disbanded on 11 April 1918.

The 84th Battalion recruited and was mobilized in Toronto, Ontario.

The 84th Battalion was commanded by Lt.-Col. W.T. Stewart from 20 June 1916 to 20 September 1916.

The 84th Battalion was awarded the battle honour THE GREAT WAR 1916.

The 84th Battalion, CEF is perpetuated by The Toronto Scottish Regiment (Queen Elizabeth The Queen Mother's Own).

== Sources ==
- Canadian Expeditionary Force 1914–1919 by Col. G.W.L. Nicholson, CD, Queen's Printer, Ottawa, Ontario, 1962
