= Donald Sharpe =

Canadian politician

Lieutenant Colonel Donald Sharpe

MPP for Welland
- In office June 29, 1914 – September 23, 1919

Personal details
- Born: May 13, 1875 Willoughby Township, Ontario
- Died: May 11, 1966 (aged 90) St. Catharines, Ontario
- Party: Progressive Conservative Party of Ontario

Donald Sharpe (May 13, 1875 – May 11, 1966) was a farmer and political figure in Ontario. He represented Welland in the Legislative Assembly of Ontario from 1914 to 1919 as a Conservative member.

== Biography ==
He was born in Willoughby township, the son of James Sharpe, of Scottish origin, and Sarah Wells, and was educated in Crowland township. In 1902, he married Bertha Hartley. He served on the councils for Crowland township and Thorold township and was reeve of Thorold from 1907 to 1913. Sharpe was also warden for Welland County. He was deputy grand master for the Orange Lodge. Sharpe joined the 2nd Dragoons as a private and reached the rank of major. He transferred to the Canadian Mounted Rifles of Hamilton, reaching the rank of lieutenant-colonel, and later served as lieutenant-colonel for the 176th battalion of the Canadian Expeditionary Force. He died in 1966.
