= Toronto Scottish Regiment (Queen Elizabeth The Queen Mother's Own) =

Military unit in Canada

The Toronto Scottish Regiment (Queen Elizabeth The Queen Mother's Own)
- Active: 1920–present
- Country: Canada
- Branch: Canadian Army
- Type: Infantry
- Role: Direct fire support
- Size: Four platoons
- Part of: 32 Canadian Brigade Group
- Headquarters: Captain B.S. Hutcheson VC Armoury, Toronto
- Nickname: Tor Scots
- Motto: "Carry on!"
- March: Quick: "Blue Bonnets over the Border"
- Anniversaries: Regimental birthday (as The Toronto Scottish Regiment) 1 September 1921
- Engagements: First World War; Second World War; War in Afghanistan
- Battle honours: See Battle honours
- Website: www.torscotr.ca

Commanders
- Colonel-in-chief: Charles III
- Commanding officer: Lieutenant Colonel Ann Lockhart
- Regimental sergeant major: Chief Warrant Officer Officer Glenn Fraser

The Toronto Scottish Regiment (Queen Elizabeth The Queen Mother's Own) is a Primary Reserve infantry regiment of the Canadian Army based in Toronto, Ontario, Canada. The regiment was first formed in 1915 as the 75th (Mississauga) Battalion, CEF, and was later reorganized several times before being officially designated as The Toronto Scottish Regiment (Queen Elizabeth The Queen Mother's Own).

The regiment's current mission task is to provide direct fire support (DFS). Members of the regiment are trained in the tactical and strategic employment of various company-level heavy weapon systems, including the Browning M2 heavy machine gun (HMG), the C16 Automatic Grenade Launcher System (AGLS), and the BGM-71 tube-launched optically-tracked wire-guided (TOW) antitank guided missile (ATGM) to provide DFS to a manoeuvring battle group.

As a Primary Reserve infantry regiment, The Toronto Scottish Regiment augments 3rd Battalion, The Royal Canadian Regiment, in Petawawa, Ontario, by providing DFS on exercises and operations.

== History ==
=== First World War ===
Great War distinguishing patch of the 75th Battalion (Mississauga), CEF

The 75th (Mississauga) Battalion, the predecessor to The Toronto Scottish Regiment was raised on July 1, 1915, by Lieutenant-Colonel Samuel Beckett. Within three weeks more than 1,500 personnel had been recruited. On 29 March 1916 the battalion was fully trained and sailed for Liverpool. Over 5,500 soldiers served in the battalion during the First World War, of whom 1,049 were killed, including Lieutenant-Colonel Samuel Beckett. The 75th Battalion CEF was awarded 16 battle honours, and Captain Bellenden Hutcheson, the medical officer, was awarded the Victoria Cross. In 1921 the regiment was renamed The Toronto Scottish Regiment by the commanding officer of the day, Lieutenant-Colonel Colin Harbottle, CMG, DSO, VD.

The 84th Battalion, CEF was authorized on 10 July 1915 and embarked for Great Britain on 18 June 1916. There, on 30 June 1916, its personnel were absorbed by the 73rd Battalion (Royal Highlanders of Canada), CEF, 75th Battalion (Mississauga), CEF and other units of the 4th Canadian Division, to provide reinforcements for the Canadian Corps in the field. The battalion disbanded on 11 April 1918.

=== Second World War ===
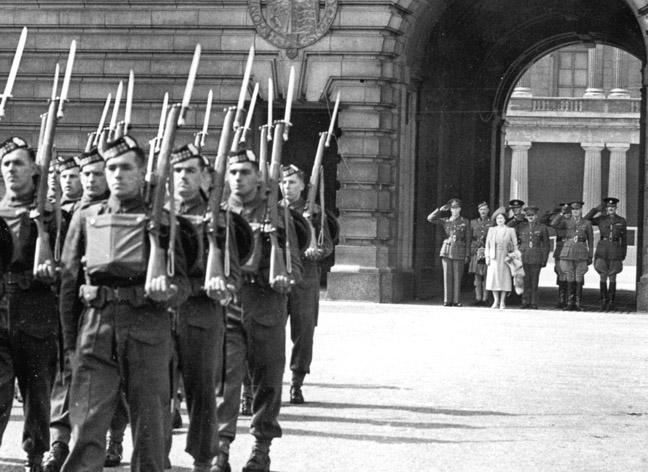
1st Battalion mounts the King's Guard in London, 1940

During the Second World War, the regiment initially mobilized a machine gun battalion for the 1st Canadian Infantry Division. Following a reorganization early in 1940, the battalion was reassigned to the 2nd Canadian Infantry Division, where it operated as a support battalion, providing machine-gun detachments for the Operation Jubilee force at Dieppe in 1942, and then with an additional company of mortars, it operated in support of the rifle battalions of the 2nd Division in northwest Europe from July 1944 to VE Day. In April 1940, the 1st Battalion also mounted the King's Guard at Buckingham Palace. The 2nd Battalion served in the reserve army in Canada.

During the Second World War, the Regiment mobilized as The Toronto Scottish Regiment (Machine Gun), CASF for active service on 1 September 1939. It was redesignated as the 1st Battalion, The Toronto Scottish Regiment (Machine Gun), CASF on 7 November 1940; as the 2nd Infantry Division Support Battalion (The Toronto Scottish Regiment), CIC, CASF on 1 May 1943; and as the 1st Battalion, The Toronto Scottish Regiment (Machine Gun), CIC, CASF on 24 February 1944. On 7 December 1939, it embarked for Great Britain. In April 1940, the 1st Battalion also mounted the King's Guard at Buckingham Palace. The 2nd Battalion served in the reserve army in Canada. The battalion took part in Operation Jubilee on 19 August 1942. It landed again in France on 6 and 7 July 1944, as part of the 2nd Infantry Division. The battalion continued to fight in North-West Europe until the end of the war. The overseas battalion disbanded on 31 December 1945.

=== Post war to the present day ===
In 2000, the regiment added a secondary title in recognition of Queen Elizabeth The Queen Mother's long service as colonel-in-chief, since 1938. The regiment was now referred to as "The Toronto Scottish Regiment (Queen Elizabeth The Queen Mother's Own)." The regiment was part of the escort at her funeral in April 2002. The regimental tartan is hodden grey.

On 12 September 2009, the regimental headquarters, A Company and Administration Company moved to the Captain Bellenden Seymour Hutcheson VC Armoury, which is shared with the Toronto Police Service. The armoury is a green building, earning a Leadership in Energy and Environmental Design (LEEDS) silver rating. On 8 May 2012, 75th Company moved from its previous location in Mississauga to a new shared government facility, the Garry W. Morden Centre, with the City of Mississauga Emergency Training Services.

The regiment contributed an aggregate of more than 20 per cent of its authorized strength to the various Task Forces which served in Afghanistan between 2002 and 2014. On 26 October 2015 the Afghanistan battle honour was presented to the regiment and added to the regimental colour by Prince Edward, Earl of Wessex.

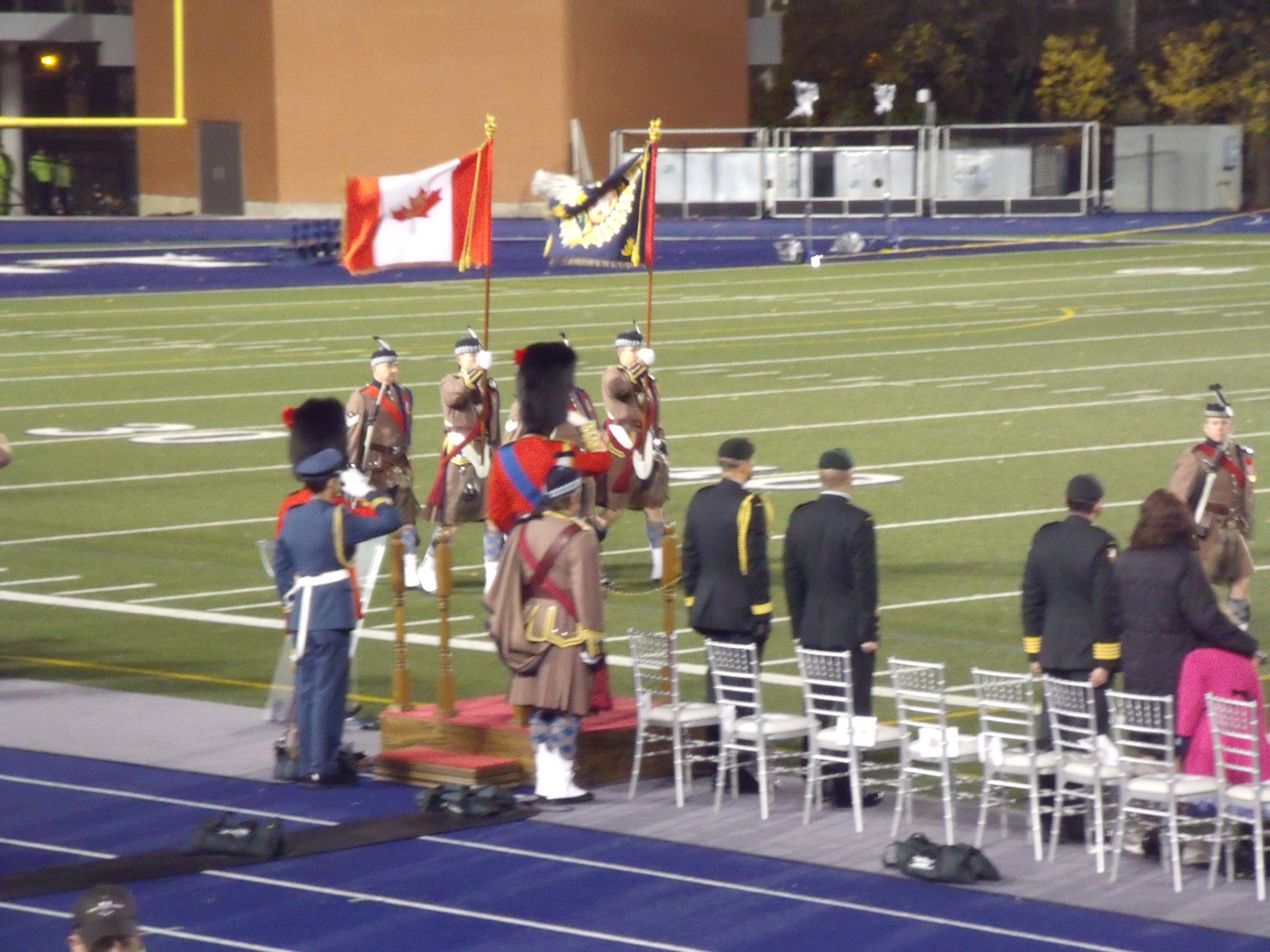
Presentation of colours march past

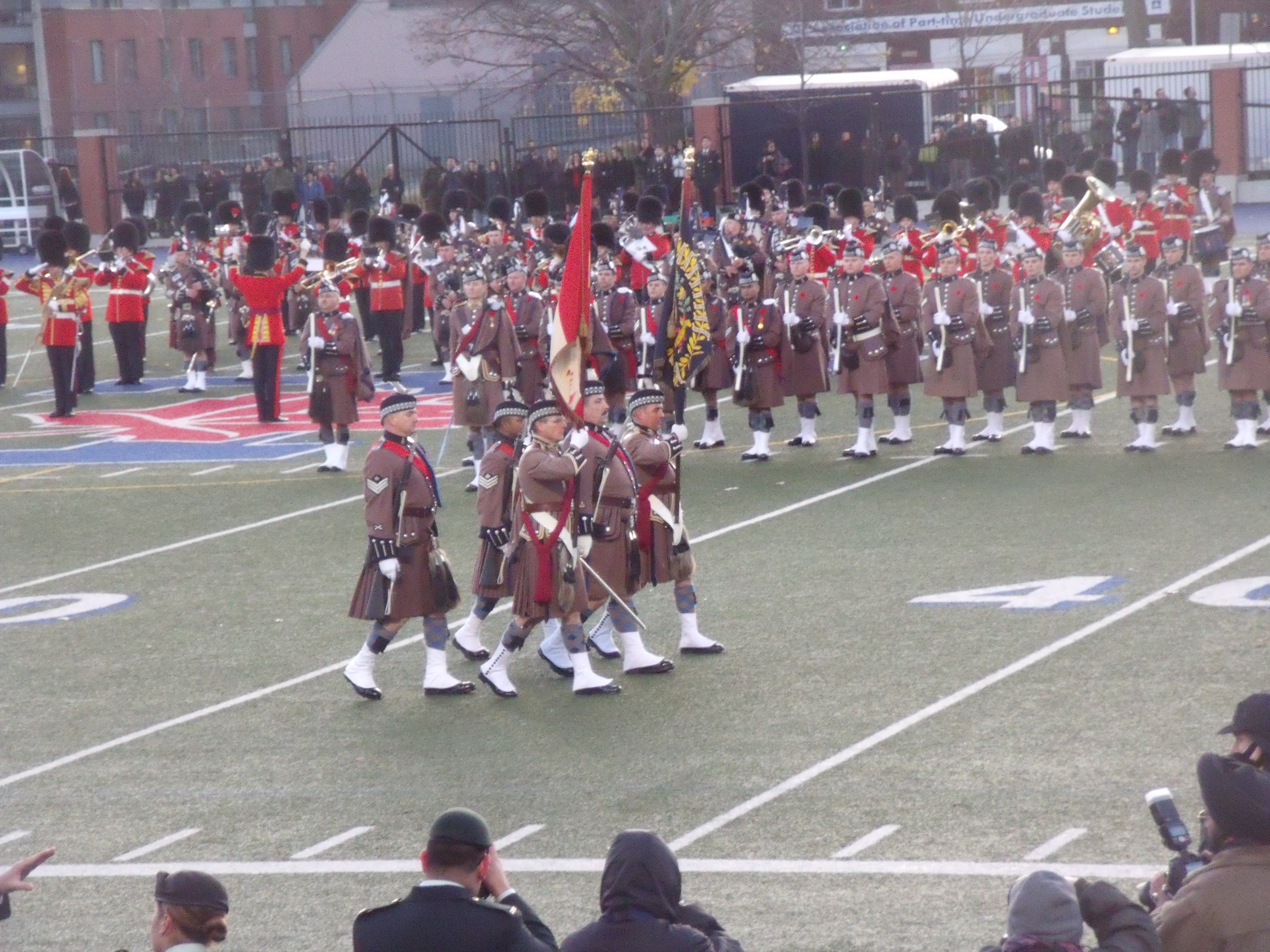
Presentation of colours march off

On 31 March 2025, the regiment appointed Lieutenant-Colonel A.M. Lockhart CD as their commanding officer, taking over command of the regiment from Lieutenant-Colonel R.J.C. Kearney CD. Lockhart is the first woman to take command of the regiment.

== Lineage ==
Lineage chart

1915 | 75th "Overseas" Bn, CEF | 84th "Overseas" Bn, CEF
1916 | Absorbed by 73rd and 75th "Overseas" Bn
1920 | Disbanded | 1st Bn (75th Bn, CEF), The Mississauga Regt | 2nd Bn (84th Bn, CEF), (Note: Reserve) The Mississauga Regt
1921 | 1st Bn (75th Bn, CEF), The Toronto Scottish Regt | 2nd Bn (84th Bn, CEF), The Toronto Scottish Regt
B and C Coy, 1st MG Bn, CMGC
1936 | Disbanded
1936 | The Toronto Scottish Regt (MG)
1939 | The Toronto Scottish Regt (MG), CASF
1940 | 1st Bn, The Toronto Scottish Regt (MG), CASF | 2nd Bn, The Toronto Scottish Regt (MG)
1943 | 2nd Infy Div. Support Bn (The Toronto Scottish Regt), CIC, CASF
1944 | 1st Bn, The Toronto Scottish Regt (MG), CIC, CASF
1945 | Disbanded
1947 | The Toronto Scottish Regt
2000 | The Toronto Scottish Regt (Queen Elizabeth The Queen Mother's Own)

== Perpetuations ==
=== Great War ===
- 75th Battalion (Mississauga), CEF
- 84th Battalion, CEF

== Alliances ==
- United Kingdom - Highlanders (Seaforth, Gordons and Camerons), 4th Battalion, Royal Regiment of Scotland
- United Kingdom - The London Scottish

== Battle honours ==
Regimental colour, featuring the cypher of Queen Elizabeth the Queen Mother

Battle honours in small capitals are for large operations and campaigns and those in lowercase are for more specific battles. Bold type indicates honours authorized to be emblazoned on regimental colours.

| First World War | Second World War | South-West Asia |
|---|---|---|
| **Somme, 1916**; **Ancre Heights**; **Ancre, 1916**; **Arras, 1917, '18**; **Vimy, 1917**; **Hill 70**; **Ypres, 1917**; **Passchendaele**; **Amiens**; **Scarpe, 1918**; **Drocourt–Quéant**; **Hindenburg Line**; **Canal du Nord**; **Valenciennes**; **Sambre**; **France and Flanders, 1916–18** | **Dieppe**; **Bourguébus Ridge**; **St. André-sur-Orne**; **Verrières Ridge–Tilly-la-Campagne**; **Falaise**; **Falaise Road**; **Clair Tizon**; **Dunkirk, 1944**; **Antwerp–Turnhout Canal**; **The Scheldt**; **Woensdrecht**; **South Beveland**; **The Rhineland**; **The Reichswald**; **Goch–Calcar Road**; **The Hochwald**; **Xanten**; **Twente Canal**; **Groningen**; **Oldenburg**; **North-West Europe, 1942, 1944–1945** | **Afghanistan** |

== Toronto Scottish Regiment Museum ==
The regiment's museum was formerly at the Fort York Armoury in Toronto. The museum was opened in 1984 by Queen Elizabeth the Queen Mother. In September 2009, the museum was relocated to the Captain Bellenden Seymore Hutcheson VC Armoury in Etobicoke and officially re-opened on 1 May 2010. The museum includes uniforms, weapons, artifacts and military memorabilia. The museum is open by appointment and during regimental events.

== Media ==
- "Carry On"; The History of the Toronto Scottish Regiment (M.G.) 1939–1945 by Major D. W. Grant (1949)
- Toronto's Fighting 75th in the Great War 1915–1919, by Regimental Historian Timothy J. Stewart CD (2017)

== See also ==
- Canadian-Scottish regiment
- The Canadian Crown and the Canadian Forces
- Australia - 5th/6th Battalion, Royal Victoria Regiment

== Notes and references ==
- Barnes, RM, The Uniforms and History of the Scottish Regiments, London, Sphere Books Limited, 1972.

== Order of precedence ==
| Preceded by The Irish Regiment of Canada | The Toronto Scottish Regiment (Queen Elizabeth The Queen Mother's Own) | Succeeded by Royal Newfoundland Regiment |
