= 81st Battalion, CEF =

Canadian infantry battalion

The 81st Battalion, CEF was an infantry battalion of the Canadian Expeditionary Force during the Great War. The 81st Battalion was authorized on 10 July 1915 and embarked for Britain on 28 April 1916. The battalion provided reinforcements to the Canadian Corps in the field until 6 July 1916, when its personnel were absorbed by the 35th Reserve Battalion, CEF. The battalion was subsequently disbanded on 27 July 1917.

The 81st Battalion recruited in and was mobilized at Toronto, Ontario.

The 81st Battalion was commanded by Lt.-Col. B. H. Belson from 1 May 1916 to 5 July 1916.

The 81st Battalion was awarded the battle honour THE GREAT WAR 1916.

The 81st Battalion, CEF is perpetuated by The Lincoln and Welland Regiment.

Photographs of thirty-one of the officers of the 81st Battalion were printed in the Toronto Star on 22 January 1916. Of those officers, a number were to die during the first World War. Their stories and photograph collections can be found on the Canadian Virtual War Memorial (Veterans Affairs Canada, Canada Remembers).

Lieut. Harry Valmond Walker, who later served with the 58th Battalion, died 8 October 1916. His friend, Lt. Gordon King MacKendrick, also formerly an 81st officer, died with the 58th Battalion on the same day as Lt. Harry Valmond Walker.

Lt. Arthur Beamer McCormick, Military Cross, 3rd Battalion, died 10 April 1917.

Lt. Herbert Edward Moore, 4th C.M.R., died 2 October 1916.

Lt. Frederick Gustavus Stupart, 75th Battalion, died 22 October 1916.

Lt Archibald Franklin McKinlay. Volunteered with 81st, Killed in Action August 8, 1918 with the 2nd Bn, Somme, France. Archibald Franklin McKinlay Memorial.
