= 176th Battalion (Niagara Rangers), CEF =

The 176th (Niagara Rangers) Battalion, CEF, was a unit in the Canadian Expeditionary Force during the First World War.

== History ==
Based in St. Catharines, Ontario, the unit began recruiting in January 1916 in Lincoln and Welland counties. Their training ground and campsite was on Spring St., Niagara Falls, where Memorial School was built in 1921. The unit left Niagara on 24 April 1917 bound for England. Upon arrival, the battalion was absorbed into the 12th Reserve Battalion.

The 176th (Niagara Rangers) Battalion, CEF, had one Officer Commanding: Lieutenant-Colonel Donald Sharpe.

== Perpetuation ==
After the war, the perpetuation of the battalion was assigned to The Lincoln Regiment in 1920, and then to the Lincoln and Welland Regiment in 1936.

== Insignia ==
The 176th Battalion were identified by a horseshoe surrounding Niagara Falls on a wreath of maples. Contained within scrolls were the words "Niagara Rangers", "Canada", "Overseas Battalion". The number 176 was placed between the ends of the horseshoe.
