= Lincoln and Welland Regiment =

The Lincoln and Welland Regiment
- Regimental badge
- Active: 1863–present
- Country: Province of Canada (1863–1867); Canada (1867–present)
- Branch: Canadian Army
- Type: Line infantry
- Role: Light Infantry
- Size: One battalion
- Part of: 31 Canadian Brigade Group
- Garrison/HQ: St. Catharines, Ontario
- Motto: Non nobis sed patriae (Latin for 'Not for ourselves but for our country')
- March: "The Lincolnshire Poacher"
- Engagements: Fenian Raids; First World War; Second World War; War in Afghanistan
- Battle honours: See #Battle honours
- Website: canada.ca/en/army/corporate/4-canadian-division/the-lincoln-and-welland-regiment.html

Commanders
- Current commander: LCol J. Robinson
- RSM: CWO T. Feletar
- Colonel-in-chief: Sophie, Duchess of Edinburgh

The Lincoln and Welland Regiment is a Primary Reserve infantry regiment of the Canadian Army based in St. Catharines, Ontario.

The regimental colonel-in-chief is Sophie, Duchess of Edinburgh, and the regimental motto is Non nobis sed patriæ, "Not for us but for our country".

== History ==
=== Perpetuated units 1794–1863 ===
In 1794, John Butler, who had commanded Butler's Rangers during the American Revolution was appointed Commanding Officer of three battalions of Nassau Militia. Nassau (later Home District) was one of the Districts of Upper Canada, Niagara being only part of the district. By 1791 the battalions had a strength of 835 all ranks.

With the reorganization of the province into sixteen counties in 1792, Lincoln County (with 20 townships) came into existence. The militia was renamed and the Lincoln Militia, with three battalions came into being, some 849 strong. By 1794, Butler was a full colonel with four battalions reporting 976 all ranks. Many of the officers, NCOs and men had served with Butler’s Rangers during the Revolution and had received land grants in Niagara for this service. There is, however, no lineal connection of the Lincoln and Welland Regiment to Butler’s Rangers.

By 1808, there were five regiments of Lincoln Militia:

- The 1st Regiment of Lincoln Militia, commanded by Col. Ralfe Clench and Lieutenant-Colonel Robert Kerr, drawn from Niagara, Louth and Grantham townships.
- The 2nd Regiment of Lincoln Militia, commanded by Lieutenant-Colonel Peter Ball, drawn from Stamford, Thorold and Pelham.
- The 3rd Regiment of Lincoln Militia, commanded by Lieutenant-Colonel Henry Warren, from Crowland, Willoughby and Bertie.
- The 4th Regiment of Lincoln Militia, commanded by Lieutenant-Colonel Johnson Butler from Grimsby and Clinton.
- The 5th Regiment of Lincoln Militia, commanded by Colonel Peter Hare and Lieutenant-Colonel Andrew Brandt from Ancaster, Barton, Saltfleet, Glanford and Binbrook.

At the outbreak of the War of 1812, flank companies (limited to three officers and 38 men), of the five regiments took the field in all major engagements from Niagara to Detroit including the Battles of Queenston Heights, Lundy's Lane, Stoney Creek and Fort Detroit. The flank companies took the field together with militias raised by various former officers including Colonel Isaac Swayze and did most of the militia's fighting. In all cases they were a credit to their country.

During the Rebellions of 1837–1838, units of the Lincoln Militia were called out to quell rebel uprisings in the Niagara Peninsula and the 2nd Lincolns were warned for duty in Toronto. In 1838, the 2nd conducted marches into the Short Hills to subdue rebel activity there. In 1846, Lincoln County was divided and Welland County was formed with three battalions of militia. The militia "regiments" were renamed "battalions".

=== Fenian raids ===
The 19th Battalion Volunteer Militia (Infantry), Canada was called out on active service on 1 June 1866 and served on the Niagara frontier. The battalion was removed from active service on 22 June 1866.

The 19th "Lincoln" Battalion of Infantry was called out on active service on 24 May 1870 and served on the Niagara frontier. The battalion was removed from active service on 3 June 1870.

=== Great War ===
The 19th "Lincoln" Regiment and 44th Lincoln and Welland Regiment were placed on active service on 6 August 1914 for local protection duties with the Welland Canal Force.

The 81st Battalion, CEF was authorized on 10 July 1915 and embarked for Britain on 28 April 1916 where it provided reinforcements to the Canadian Corps in the field until 6 July 1916, when its personnel were absorbed by the 35th Reserve Battalion, CEF. The battalion was subsequently disbanded on 27 July 1917.

The 98th Battalion (Lincoln & Welland), CEF was authorized on 22 December 1915 and embarked for Britain on 16 July 1916 where it provided reinforcements to the Canadian Corps in the field until 6 October 1916, when its personnel were absorbed by the 12th Reserve Battalion, CEF. The battalion was subsequently disbanded on 17 July 1917.

The 176th Battalion (Niagara Rangers), CEF was authorized on 15 July 1916 and embarked for Britain on 29 April 1917. On 9 May 1917, its personnel were absorbed by the 12th Reserve Battalion, CEF to provide reinforcements to the Canadian Corps. The battalion was subsequently disbanded on 30 August 1920.

By the end of the war the 44th Lincoln and Welland Regiment had gained the battle honors Ypres, 1915, '17; Festubert, 1915; Somme, 1916; Arras, 1917; and Hill 70.

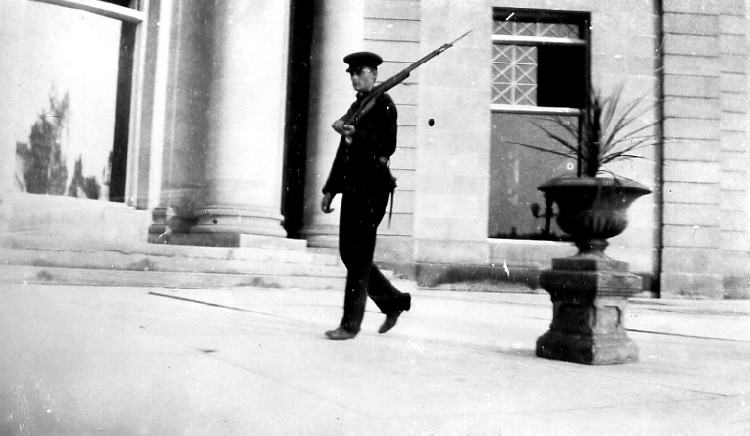
A soldier from the 19th Lincoln Regiment on guard at the Toronto Power Generating Station in 1914.

=== 1920s–1930s ===
Between the wars, both the Lincoln Regiment and the Lincoln and Welland Regiment were greatly restricted in the training they were able to conduct. For example, the Lincoln Regiment trained 12 days in 1920, 9 days a year between 1922 and 1927, 12 days a year from 1928 to 1931 and 10 days a year from 1932 to 1936. On 15 December 1936, the two units were reorganized into the Lincoln and Welland Regiment with an establishment of 467 all ranks.

=== Second World War ===
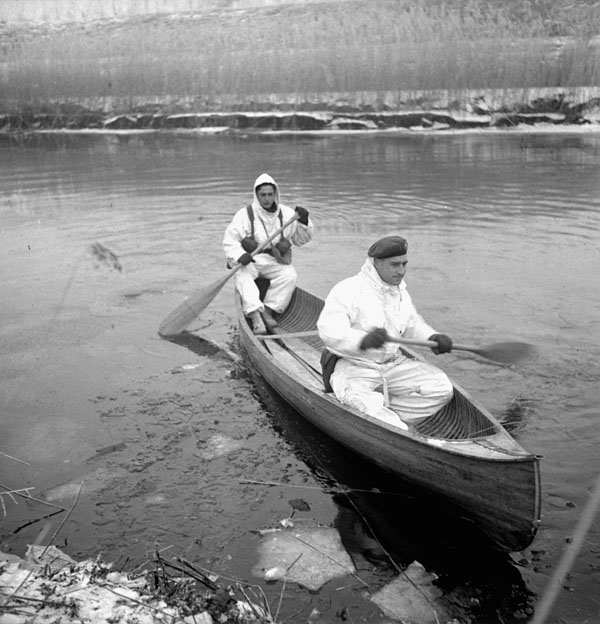
Infantrymen of the regiment in a canoe, training for the assault on Kapelsche Veer, Netherlands, January 26, 1945

The regiment was called out on service on 26 August 1939 and then details were placed on active service on 1 September 1939, designated as The Lincoln and Welland Regiment, CASF (Details), for local protection duties. The details were formed as an active service battalion and designated The Lincoln and Welland Regiment, CASF on 15 August 1940. It was redesignated as the 1st Battalion, The Lincoln and Welland Regiment, CASF on 7 November 1940. The unit served in British Columbia, as part of the 13th Canadian Infantry Brigade, and in Newfoundland in a home defence role as part of Atlantic Command. On 16 July 1943 the 1st Battalion embarked for Britain. On 25 July 1944 it landed in France as a part of the 10th Canadian Infantry Brigade, 4th Canadian Armoured Division, and it continued to fight in North-West Europe until the end of the war. The overseas battalion was disbanded on 15 February 1946.

The highest and most distinguished award for valour, the Order of the Bronze Lion was bestowed upon the regiment's Sergeant Wallace Edmond Firlotte.

From Tilly-la-Campagne on 31 July 1944 until Bad Zwischenahn on 1 May 1945, the regiment distinguished itself in many actions. Over 1500 men of the regiment were casualties. Of the original men who enlisted in 1940, only three officers and 22 men were on parade in St. Catharines in 1946 when the 1st Battalion was dismissed.

In late December 1945, the regiment requested authority to ship to Canada its M5A1 Stuart VI reconnaissance tank Serial No. WD CT271427, manufacturer's number 10778, nicknamed Press-On, to assist in forming a regimental museum collection. This tank was salvaged and repaired by the unit's Pioneer Platoon after being blown up on a mine in the battalion area. The turret was removed, and it served as the commanding officer's command and reconnaissance vehicle through action in Holland and Germany. The request cited its presence on the battlefield signified that the commanding officer was present as an inspiration and confidence to all ranks. Its reputation as a mascot, led all those on strength at the end of hostilities to sign their names on the sides. It is a late production M5A1, with periscope guards on the crew hatches, a large rear storage box, and a not uncommon mix of road wheel types. It now stands in front of the armoury in St. Catharines.

=== Postwar ===
In the years since the Second World War, the regiment has busied itself with the many tasks traditionally entrusted to the Canadian Militia during peace time. Ceremonial parades have been attended and guards mounted, most notably the visits of the Princess Elizabeth (later Queen Elizabeth II) and Prince Philip to Niagara Falls in 1951 and Queen Elizabeth the Queen Mother to Niagara-on-the-Lake in 1981.

During the Blizzard of 1977 in the Niagara Peninsula the regiment was called out to provide assistance to the civil authority. It rescued over 1500 stranded school children and provided assistance to countless residents during the emergency. For this assistance, the regiment received a vote of thanks from the House of Commons. The regiment provided volunteers to assist during the 1997 Red River flood and the 1998 Ice Storm in Eastern Ontario and Quebec.

The year 1994 marked the 200th anniversary of the regiment and was commemorated in many ways. The trooping the colours, presentation of freedom of the town of Fort Erie and the dedication of the regiment's memorial garden all served to remind the regiment and the community of the service and sacrifice of two centuries.

Due to an administrative oversight, two battle honours earned in north-western Germany during the final weeks of the Second World War were not awarded to the regiment until 1995. In October 1995, at the regiment's annual church parade, scrolls commemorating the battles of Küsten Canal and Bad Zwischenahn were presented by members of the regimental association.

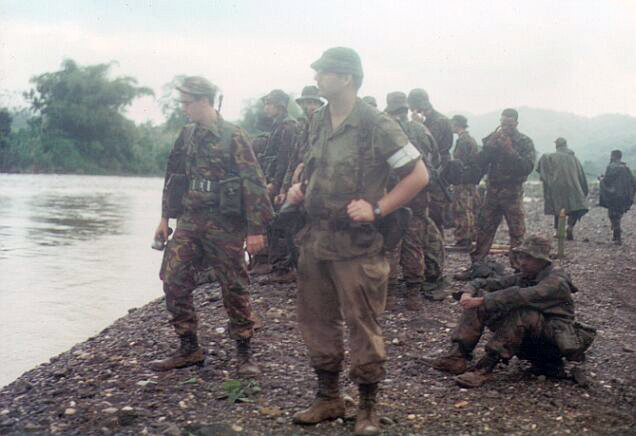
A Lincoln and Welland Regiment NCO attached to a rifle company of the affiliated Bermuda Regiment, training in Jamaica, 1996.

In 2012, as part of the Diamond Jubilee tour of Canada, Sophie, Countess of Wessex, presented new regimental colours to the regiment which included the battle honour Niagara based on the regiment's perpetuation of the Incorporated Militia Battalion of Upper Canada. The regiment also perpetuates the 1st, 2nd, 3rd, 4th and 5th Regiments of the Lincoln Militia as well as the Coloured Corps from the War of 1812 thus linking the regiment to the Battles of Detroit, Queenston Heights and the Niagara campaign.

=== War in Afghanistan ===
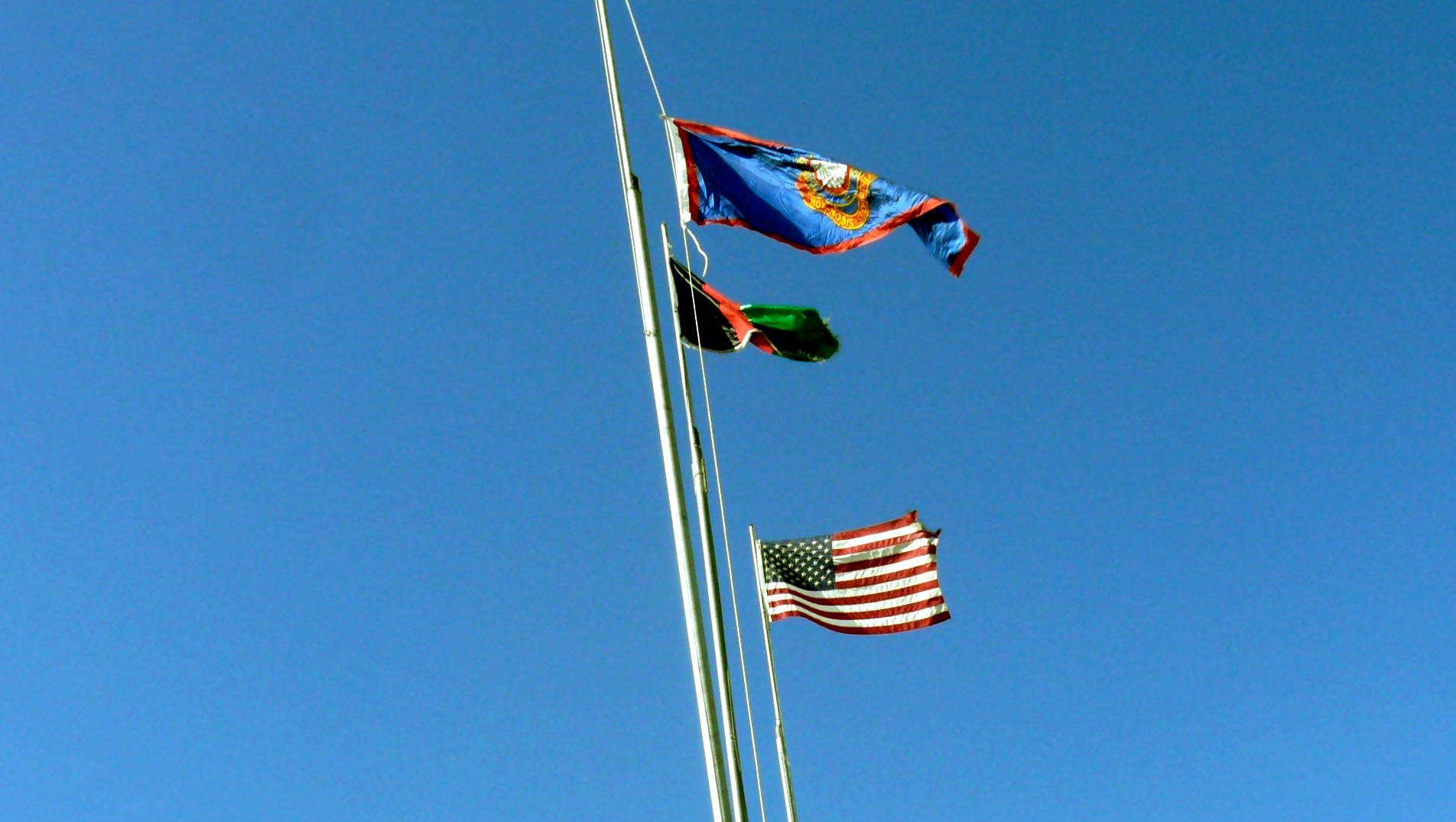
The Lincoln and Welland camp flag, Afghan flag and the U.S. flag flying at a base in the vicinity of Spin Boldak in February 2009.

The regiment contributed an aggregate of more than 20% of its authorized strength to the various task forces which served in Afghanistan between 2002 and 2014.

On 3 March 2009, Warrant Officer Dennis R "Browny" Brown, of St Catharines, deployed on operations, was killed by an improvised explosive device, along with two other Canadian soldiers. Two more soldiers were injured and evacuated for treatment. Their armoured vehicle was in the Arghandab District approximately 10 kms northwest of Kandahar City. They were returning to base after defusing another roadside bomb. Warrant Officer Brown had 20 years service and was on leave from his civilian job of 8 years as a special constable with the Niagara Regional Police.

=== Perpetuated units ===
The Lincoln and Welland Regiment perpetuates the Battalion of Incorporated Militia of Upper Canada, The Coloured Corps (Captain Runchey's Company of Coloured Men), the 1st, 2nd, 3rd, 4th, and 5th Regiments of Lincoln Militia of the War of 1812.

Great War Canadian Expeditionary Force battalions perpetuated by the Lincoln and Welland Regiment include the 81st Battalion, CEF, the 98th Battalion (Lincoln & Welland), CEF, and the 176th Battalion (Niagara Rangers), CEF.

== Cap badge ==
The crown represents service to the Sovereign. The design commemorates the former units which were amalgamated in 1936 to form the regiment. The general outline of the badge is derived from the badge of the Lincoln Regiment and the escallop, an emblem used by the former County of Welland, is from the badge of the Lincoln and Welland Regiment. "Lincoln and Welland" is a form of the regimental title and "non nobis sed patriae" is the motto of the regiment, meaning "not for ourselves but for our country".

== Lineage ==
Regimental colour (pre-2012)

Camp flag

=== Lincoln and Welland Regiment ===
The Lincoln and Welland Regiment originated in St. Catharines on 18 March 1863 as The 19th Battalion Volunteer Militia (Infantry), Canada. It was redesignated as the 19th "Lincoln Battalion of Infantry" on 28 September 1866; as the 19th St. Catharines Battalion of Infantry on 1 October 1897; as the 19th St. Catharines Regiment on 8 May 1900; as the 19th "Lincoln" Regiment on 2 November 1912; and, following the Great War, as The Lincoln Regiment on 1 May 1920. On 15 December 1936, it was amalgamated with the Lincoln and Welland Regiment and redesignated The Lincoln and Welland Regiment. During the Second World War it was redesignated as the 2nd (Reserve) Battalion, The Lincoln and Welland Regiment on 7 November 1940, returning to its pre-war designation as the Lincoln and Welland Regiment on 15 February 1946.

=== Lincoln and Welland Regiment (1866–1936) ===
The Lincoln and Welland Regiment originated in Clifton, Canada West, on 16 November 1866 as the 44th "Welland" Battalion of Infantry. It was redesignated as the 44th Lincoln and Welland Battalion of Infantry on 1 October 1897; as the 44th Lincoln and Welland Regiment on 8 May 1900; and following the Great War as The Lincoln and Welland Regiment on 1 May 1920. On 15 December 1936, it was amalgamated with the Lincoln Regiment and retained its designation.

The regiment maintained alliances with the Royal Berkshire Regiment in the United Kingdom (1928-1936), and The Hawkes Bay Regiment in New Zealand, both until 1936.

Notable members of the regiment included:

- Brigadier General Frederic William Hill, CB CMG DSO VD KC
- Brigadier General Ernest Alexander Cruikshank FRSC

The regiment's lineage was as follows:

- Originated on 16 November 1866, in Clifton, Canada West, as the 44th Welland Battalion of Infantry.
- Redesignated on 1 October 1897, as the 44th Lincoln and Welland Battalion of Infantry.
- Redesignated on 8 May 1900, as the 44th Lincoln and Welland Regiment.
- Redesignated on 1 May 1920, as The Lincoln and Welland Regiment.
- Amalgamated on 15 December 1936, with the Lincoln Regiment to form The Lincoln and Welland Regiment.

=== Lineage chart ===
Lineage chart

1812
1815
1862
1863
1866
1870
1897
1900
1912
1915
1916
1917
1920
1936
1936
1940
1940
1946
2012

Bn of Incorporated Militia of Upper Canada	The Coloured Corps (Capt Runchey’s Coy of Coloured Men)
Disbanded	Disbanded
Independent infy coys
The 19th Bn Volunteer Militia (Infy), Canada
19th "Lincoln Bn of Infy" (Note: Active service in June)
Active service (Note: May–June)
19th St. Catharines Bn of Infy
19th St. Catharines Regt
19th "Lincoln" Regt
81st "Overseas" Bn, CEF
Absorbed by 35th Reserve Bn	176th "Overseas" Bn, CEF
Absorbed by 12th Reserve Bn
1st Bn (81st Bn, CEF), The Lincoln Regt	2nd Bn (176th Bn, CEF), (Note: Reserve) The Lincoln Regt
Disbanded
The Lincoln and Welland Regt
The Lincoln and Welland Regt, CASF
1st Bn, The Lincoln and Welland Regt, CASF	2nd (Reserve) Bn, The Lincoln and Welland Regt
Disbanded	The Lincoln and Welland Regt
Perpetuates War of 1812 units

1st, 2nd, 3rd, 4th, and 5th Regts of Lincoln Militia
Disbanded
Independent infy coys
44th "Welland" Bn of Infy
44th Lincoln and Welland Bn of Infy
44th Lincoln and Welland Regt
98th "Overseas" Bn, CEF
Absorbed by 12th Reserve Bn
1st Bn (98th Bn, CEF), The Lincoln and Welland Regt

== Alliances ==
- United Kingdom – The Royal Anglian Regiment
- United Kingdom – The Rifles
- Bermuda – The Royal Bermuda Regiment
- Australia – The Royal Queensland Regiment
- New Zealand – The Wellington (City of Wellington's Own) and Hawke's Bay Regiment

The regiment is also connected with cadet corps 68 Lincoln and Welland Regiment RCACC in St. Catharines, 613 Lincoln and Welland Regiment RCACC in Fonthill, and the Robert Land Academy army cadet corps in Wellandport.

== Battle honours ==
Battle honours in small capitals are for large operations and campaigns and those in lowercase are for more specific battles. Bold type indicates honours authorized to be emblazoned on regimental colours.

Pre-2012 regimental colour

War of 1812
- Defence of Canada – 1812–1815 – Défense du Canada
- Detroit
- Queenston
- **Niagara**
First World War
- **Ypres, 1915**, '17
- Festubert, 1915
- **Somme, 1916**
- **Arras, 1917, '18**
- Hill 70
- **Amiens**
- Hindenburg Line
- **Pursuit to Mons**
Second World War
- **Falaise**
- Falaise Road
- **The Laison**
- Chambois
- The Seine, 1944
- **Moerbrugge**
- **The Scheldt**
- Breskens Pocket
- **The Lower Maas**
- **Kapelsche Veer**
- **The Rhineland**
- **The Hochwald**
- Veen
- **Twente Canal**
- Friesoythe
- Küsten Canal
- Bad Zwischenahn
- **North-West Europe, 1944–1945**
South-West Asia
Afghanistan

== Music ==
Old Niagara waltzes by Maud Schooley was "dedicated to the 44th Lincoln and Welland Regiment, Canadian Infantry by special permission of Lt. Colonel Cohoe and officers of the Regiment". It was published in Toronto by Canadian-American Music, circa 1905

"19th St. Catharines Regiment" march was not carried over as this regiment changed from 19th and 20th Battalions of Volunteer Militia (Infantry) Canada to: the 19th Lincoln Regiment (1912); Lincoln Regiment (192) and Lincoln and Welland Regiment (1936). Instead the regimental march became "The Lincolnshire Poacher".

== Regimental museum ==
Lincoln and Welland Regimental Museum
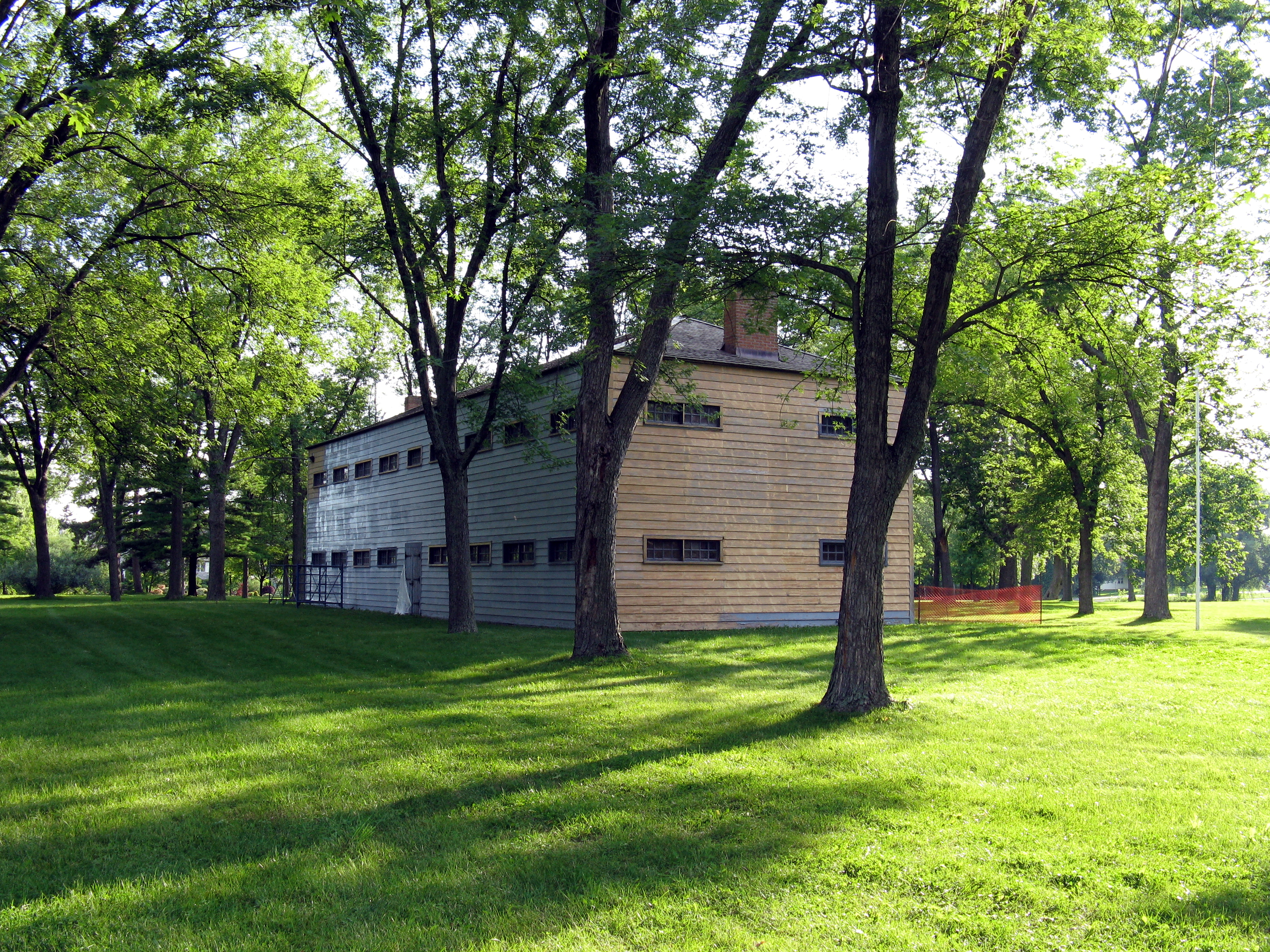
- Location: Butler's Barracks in Niagara-on-the-Lake, Ontario, Canada
- Website: niagaramilitaryheritagecentre.ca

The Lincoln and Welland Regimental Museum used to be housed in Butler's Barracks in Niagara-on-the-Lake, featuring the history of the Lincoln and Welland Regiment. Exhibits include displays and artifacts from the 18th century through the present, and include uniforms, weapons, medals, photographs, regimental band instruments, and other memorabilia. The displays show the regiment's participation in area military engagements in the 18th and 19th centuries, and overseas in World War I, World War II, for peacekeeping and other operations. The museum is affiliated with: Canadian Museums Association, Canadian Heritage Information Network, Organization of Military Museums of Canada and Virtual Museum of Canada. However, though affiliated with Virtual Museum of Canada, there is no online exhibit for the Lincoln and Welland Regiment.

The museum is now part of the larger Niagara Military Heritage Centre in Niagara Falls.

== See also ==
- Canadian Forces
- Captain Runchey's Company of Coloured Men
- History of the Canadian Army
- List of armouries in Canada
- Military history of Canada

Preceded by The Hastings and Prince Edward Regiment	The Lincoln and Welland Regiment	Succeeded by 4th Battalion, The Royal Canadian Regiment
