= 75th Battalion (Mississauga), CEF =

The 75th (Mississauga) Battalion, CEF
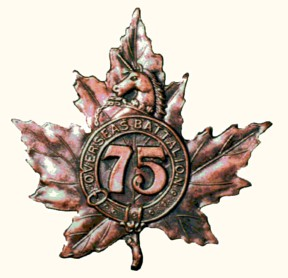
- Cap badge of the 75th Battalion (Mississauga), CEF
- Active: 10 July 1915 – 15 September 1920
- Country: Canada
- Branch: Militia
- Type: Line Infantry
- Role: Light Infantry
- Size: One battalion
- Part of: 4th Canadian Division
- Garrison/HQ: Toronto
- Nicknames: the Six-Bits, the 'Jolly 75'
- Motto: Carry On
- Colors: Laid up at Knox Presbyterian Church, Toronto, Ontario
- Battle honours: Somme, 1916; Ancre Heights; Ancre, 1916; Arras, 1917, '18; Vimy, 1917; Hill 70; Ypres, 1917; Passchendaele; Amiens; Scarpe, 1918; Drocourt-Quéant; Hindenburg Line; Canal du Nord; Valenciennes; Sambre; France and Flanders, 1916-18; (The battle honours in bold are on the Battalion Colour)

Insignia
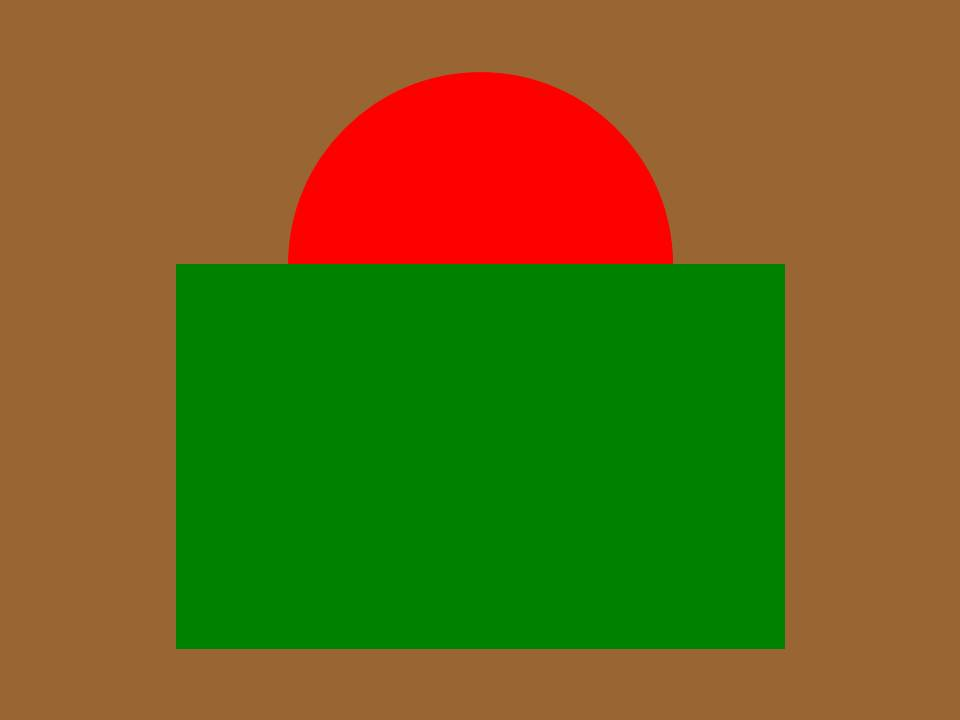
- Unit Distinguishing Patch

The 75th Battalion (Mississauga), CEF was an infantry battalion of the Canadian Expeditionary Force during the Great War. The 75th Battalion was authorized on 10 July 1915 and embarked for Great Britain on 29 March 1916. It disembarked in France on 12 August 1916, where it fought as part of the 11th Infantry Brigade, 4th Canadian Division in France and Flanders until the end of the war. The battalion was disbanded on 15 September 1920.

== History ==
The 75th Battalion was authorized on 10 July 1915. Recruitment was undertaken in Toronto, Hamilton and London, Ontario and the unit was mobilized at Toronto. The 75th was formed by Lieutenant Colonel Samuel G. Beckett, who had been trained as a cavalry officer in the 9th Mississauga Horse. Following training in Niagara and Toronto, the 75th left for overseas on 29 March 1916 and arrived on 9 April 1916.

On arrival in England they formed part of the newly created 11th Brigade of the 4th Canadian Division and saw their first action in the trenches in Belgium in August 1916. Within the month, the 75th Battalion was at the Somme and fought with great distinction in the battles at the Regina and Desire Trenches.

In December, the 75th had been moved to Vimy Ridge, immediately after taking part in the assault on the Regina Trench, where they, with the rest of the Canadian Army dug in, prepared for, and waited until the great assault on 9 April 1917.

On the night of February 28 – 1 March 1917, the 75th, along with the 72nd, the 73rd, and the 54th Battalions were chosen to conduct a multi-battalion sized raid on German positions at Hill 145 at Vimy Ridge in preparation for the larger assault 5 weeks later. A total of 1,700 personnel of all ranks participated in this large scale raid, 491 (all ranks) participating from the 75th. The defensive position was manned by soldiers of the 261st Regiment "Section Fischer" in the centre, on the left as the Canadians attacked, was the 16th Bavarian Infantry Division, and the 262nd Regiment "Section Zollern" on the right.

All 75th Battalion troops were ready at their jumping off point just behind the Snargate Trench by 0250 hours. Phosgene gas had been released by the Canadians prior to going "over the top". The gas release had alerted the defenders that an attack was forthcoming, and the alarm was raised. German shells began a steady fire on the Canadian lines, some hitting canisters of Chlorine gas that had been brought forward but not deployed. The Battalion had to wait until the gas cleared before advancing. A second wave of gas released by the 12th Brigade rolled down no-mans land right on top of the 75th, further delaying the assault. By this time the Germans were fully prepared, and waiting. After waiting for their own artillery barrage, they finally advanced at 0547 hours. The German defences were too strong to breach, especially on the right of the battalion's attack, and the battalion had no choice but to retire to the comparative safety of their own lines.

The raid was especially costly, as it claimed the life of the commanding officer, LCol S.G. Beckett, his adjutant Maj. James Miles Langstaff, and a total of 9 Officers, 112 other ranks killed, missing or wounded. These losses so depleted the battalion that its participation in the multi-divisional assault of Vimy Ridge on 9 April 1917 was as a weakened battalion in the 11th Brigade, behind the 87th Battalion, the 102nd Battalion, and the 11th Canadian Machine Gun Company. Elements of the 75th attacked in the first wave at 0530 hrs in front of the Tottenham Trench on a particularly stubborn German sniping position. By 1500 hours the area was reported clear with 40 prisoners captured.

One member of the 75th Battalion was awarded the Victoria Cross. Medical Officer Captain Bellenden Hutcheson was awarded the medal for his actions on 2 September 1918 at the Drocourt-Quéant Line.

The battalion was disbanded on 15 September 1920.

== Perpetuation ==
The 75th Battalion (Mississauga), CEF is perpetuated by The Toronto Scottish Regiment (Queen Elizabeth The Queen Mother's Own).

== Commanding officers ==
The 75th Battalion had three commanding officers:

- Lt.-Col. S.G. Beckett, 1 April 1916 – 1 March 1917
- Lt.-Col. C.B. Worsnop, DSO, 11 March 1917 – 16 April 1917
- Lt.-Col. A.J. C.C. Harbottle, DSO, 16 April 1917 – Demobilization

== See also ==
- List of infantry battalions in the Canadian Expeditionary Force
