= North West Europe =

North West Europe may refer to:

- Northwestern Europe, a loosely defined subregion of Europe, overlapping Northern and Western Europe
- North-West Europe 1940, World War II campaign also known as the Battle of France
- North West Europe campaign, the British and Commonwealth armed forces campaign in North West Europe during World War II
- North-West Europe campaign of 1940, British Army unit battle honour
- North-West Europe 1942 (battle honour), British and Canadian military unit battle honour
- North-West Europe campaign of 1944–45, British Commonwealth military unit battle honour

== See also ==
- Archdeacon of North West Europe, a Church of England archdeacon of the Diocese of Europe
