= Pictou Highlanders =

The Pictou Highlanders
- Active: 1871–1954
- Country: Canada
- Branch: Canadian Militia (1871–1940); Canadian Army (1940–1954)
- Type: Line infantry
- Role: Motor
- Size: One battalion
- Part of: Non-Permanent Active Militia (1871–1940); Royal Canadian Infantry Corps (1942–1954)
- Garrison/HQ: New Glasgow, Nova Scotia
- Motto(s): Cuidich' n Righ (Scottish Gaelic for 'Save the King')
- Colors: Facing colour buff
- March: Quick – "Pibroch o' Donald Dhu"
- Engagements: First World War

Insignia
- Tartan: Seaforth

The Pictou Highlanders was an infantry regiment of the Canadian Army from 1871 until it was amalgamated into the Nova Scotia Highlanders in 1954.

== Lineage ==
Founded in 1871 as the Colchester and Hants Provisional Battalion of Infantry it went through several name changes including, in 1871, the 78th Colchester and Hants, or Highlanders Battalion of Infantry; in 1879 the 78th Colchester, Hants and Pictou Battalion of Infantry, "Highlanders"; in 1900 the 78th Colchester, Hants and Pictou Regiment, "Highlanders"; in 1910 the 78th Pictou Regiment "Highlanders"; in 1921 The Pictou Highlanders; and in 1946 - The Pictou Highlanders (Motor).

== History ==
With the outbreak of the First World War, the 78th Pictou Regiment (Highlanders) raised volunteers for the overseas battalions of the Canadian Expeditionary Force. During the Second World War, The Pictou Highlanders were active in a defensive role but were never engaged in battle. Details of the regiment were raised for local protective duty on September 1, 1939, and full mobilization occurred on January 1, 1941. The first move that the regiment made was to Newfoundland for coastal defense duty from March until August 1943. In September of the year, one company was dispatched to Nassau, Bahamas where it performed garrison duty until March 1946. A second company entitled Special Infantry Company (Pictou Highlanders) was mobilized on September 10, 1942, for service in the garrison of the Imperial fortress of Bermuda from November 12, 1942, to April 1, 1946. Their duties performed, both the active battalion and the Special Infantry Company were disbanded on April 30, 1946. During the life of the active units, a 2nd Battalion also served in Canada in the Reserve Army.

In 1954, as a result of the Kennedy Report on the Reserve Army, this regiment was amalgamated with The North Nova Scotia Highlanders to form the 1st Battalion of The Nova Scotia Highlanders with The Cape Breton Highlanders forming the 2nd Battalion.

The Pictou Highlanders before amalgamation held its final Order of Precedence as 33.

== Alliances and uniform ==
The Pictou Highlanders were allied to The Seaforth Highlanders (Rossshire Buffs, The Duke of Albany's) and were kitted as Seaforth's except for regimental badges and the Bugle cords were Royal.

== Perpetuations ==
The regiment perpetuated the following units

=== The Great War ===
- 17th Battalion (Nova Scotia Highlanders), CEF
- 246th (Nova Scotia Highlanders) Battalion, CEF

== Battle honours ==
- Ypres, 1915
- Festubert, 1915 (Note: Selected to be borne on colours and appointments)
- Mount Sorrel
- Somme, 1916
- Amiens

== See also ==
- Canadian-Scottish regiment

== Notes and references ==
- Barnes, RM, The Uniforms and History of the Scottish Regiments, London, Sphere Books Limited, 1972.
