= Nova Scotia Highlanders =

The Nova Scotia Highlanders
- Regimental badge
- Active: 1871–present
- Country: Canada
- Branch: Canadian Army
- Type: Light infantry
- Role: Light role
- Size: One battalion
- Part of: 36 Canadian Brigade Group
- Garrison/HQ: Truro, Nova Scotia
- Nicknames: North Novies, North Novas
- Motto: Cos cheum nach gabh tilleadh (Scottish Gaelic for 'No retreating footsteps')
- March: "The Sweet Maid of Glendaruel"; "The Atholl Highlanders"; "The Piobaireachd of Donald Dhu"
- Engagements: Second Boer War; First World War; Second World War; War in Afghanistan
- Battle honours: See #Battle honours
- Website: canada.ca/en/army/corporate/5-canadian-division/the-nova-scotia-highlanders.html

Insignia
- Tartan: MacDonald, Clan Donald
- Abbreviation: NS Highrs (as seen on rank slip on); Official: NSH

The Nova Scotia Highlanders (also known as North Novies, North Novas) is an infantry regiment in the primary reserve of the Canadian Army. It is part of 36 Canadian Brigade Group, 5th Canadian Division.

== Creation ==
The regiment was formed in 1954 by the amalgamation of The North Nova Scotia Highlanders, The Cape Breton Highlanders, and The Pictou Highlanders and 189th Light Anti Aircraft Battery, Royal Canadian Artillery.

The regiment was composed of two battalions, officially designated as the 1st Battalion, The Nova Scotia Highlanders (North), and 2nd Battalion, The Nova Scotia Highlanders (Cape Breton), both of which were part of 5th Canadian Division's 36 Canadian Brigade Group.

The 2nd Battalion was headquartered in Sydney, and in 2011 it was de-amalgamated from The Nova Scotia Highlanders, to its pre-1954 designation, the Cape Breton Highlanders, becoming its own regiment. This leaves the Nova Scotia Highlanders as a one-battalion regiment. In April 2025, the regiment's motto was officially changed from siol na fear fearail (Scottish Gaelic for 'breed of manly men') to the former North Nova Scotia Highlanders' motto of cos cheum nach gabh tilleadh (Scottish Gaelic for 'our footsteps will not allow us to go backwards').

The Nova Scotia Highlanders is headquartered in Truro with individual companies in Pictou, Springhill, and Truro.

== Headdress ==
Although the 2nd Battalion continued the tradition of wearing balmorals, the traditional headdress of the regiment, the 1st Battalion did not. There was a strong movement within the unit by the majority of the troops to replace the beret with the balmoral once again as it marked out the highland unit as distinctive and showed the ties with the unit's heritage that contributed to its ésprit de corps. As of 1 January 2011 the balmoral once again became the official headdress of the 1st Battalion as well. The khaki tam o' shanter is worn in combat dress.

== Lineage ==
=== 1st Battalion, Nova Scotia highlanders (North) ===
- Originated in Truro, Nova Scotia, 6 April 1871 as the Colchester and Hants Provisional Battalion of Infantry
- Redesignated as the 78th Colchester and Hants, or Highlanders Battalion of Infantry, 1 September 1871
- Redesignated as the 78th "Colchester, Hants and Pictou" Battalion of Infantry or "Highlanders," 5 September 1879
- Redesignated as the 78th Colchester, Hants and Pictou Regiment "Highlanders," 8 May 1900
- Redesignated as the 78th Pictou Regiment "Highlanders," 1 March 1910
- Redesignated as The Pictou Regiment, 29 March 1920
- Redesignated as The Pictou Highlanders, 2 July 1920
- Redesignated as the 2nd (Reserve) Battalion, The Pictou Highlanders, 7 November 1940
- Redesignated as The Pictou Highlanders (Motor), 1 April 1946
- Amalgamated on 12 November 1954 with The North Nova Scotia Highlanders and the 189th Light Anti-Aircraft Battery, RCA and redesignated the 1st Battalion of The Nova Scotia Highlanders
- On 9 December 2010 the 2nd Battalion, The Nova Scotia Highlanders (Cape Breton) was reorganized as a separate regiment and redesignated as The Cape Breton Highlanders, the 1st battalion was redesignated the 1st Battalion, Nova Scotia highlanders (North)

=== The North Nova Scotia Highlanders ===
- Originated in Amherst, Nova Scotia, 6 April 1871 as the Cumberland Provisional Battalion of Infantry
- Redesignated as the 93rd Cumberland Battalion of Infantry, 12 June 1885
- Redesignated as the 93rd Cumberland Regiment, on 8 May 1900
- Redesignated as The Cumberland Regiment, 29 March 1920
- Redesignated as The Cumberland Highlanders, 15 June 1927
- Amalgamated on 1 December 1936 with The Colchester and Hants Regiment (less 'C Company') and C Company of the 6th Machine Gun Battalion, CMGC (now The Princess Louise Fusiliers) and redesignated as The North Nova Scotia Highlanders (Machine Gun)
- Redesignated as the 2nd (Reserve) Battalion, The North Nova Scotia Highlanders (Machine Gun), 7 November 1940
- Redesignated as the 2nd (Reserve) Battalion, The North Nova Scotia Highlanders, 7 March 1941
- Redesignated as The North Nova Scotia Highlanders, 1 May 1946.
- Amalgamated on 12 November 1954 with The Pictou Highlanders (Motor) and the 189th Light Anti-Aircraft Battery, RCA

=== The Colchester and Hants Regiment ===
- Originated in Truro, Nova Scotia, 1 April 1910 as the 70th Colchester and Hants Regiment
- Redesignated as the 76th Colchester and Hants Rifles, 2 May 1910
- Amalgamated on 15 May 1920 with the 81st "Hants" Regiment and redesignated as 'The Colchester and Hants Regiment
- Amalgamated on 1 December 1936, less "C" Company, with The Cumberland Highlanders and C Company of the 6th Machine Gun Battalion, CMGC

=== The 81st "Hants" Regiment ===
- Originated in Windsor, Nova Scotia, 16 February 1914 as an "8 company Regiment of Infantry in Hants County"
- Redesignated as the 68th Regiment, 1 May 1914
- Redesignated as the 81st "Hants" Regiment, 1 June 1914
- Amalgamated on 15 May 1920 with the 76th Colchester and Hants Rifles

=== 189th Light Anti-Aircraft Battery, RCA ===
- Originated in Stellarton, Nova Scotia, 1 April 1946
- Amalgamated on 12 November 1954 with The Pictou Highlanders (Motor) and The North Nova Scotia Highlanders

=== Chart ===
Lineage chart

1812
1815
1869
1871
1879
1885
1900
1910
1910
1914
1914
1915
1916
1917
1917
1920
1927
1936
1940
1940
1941
1942
1945
1946
1946
1951
1951
1952
1954
1955
2010
2012

1st and 2nd Bn, County of Sydney Regt	1st Bn, Cumberland Regt
Disbanded	Disbanded
Independent infy coys
78th Colchester and Hants, or Highlanders Bn of Infy
78th "Colchester, Hants and Pictou" Bn of Infy or "Highlanders"
78th Colchester, Hants and Pictou Regt "Highlanders"
78th Pictou Regt "Highlanders"
17th Bn, CEF
17th Reserve Bn, CEF
246th "Overseas" Infy Bn, CEF
Disbanded	Absorbed by 17th Reserve Bn
1st Bn (17th Bn, CEF), The Pictou Highlanders	2nd Bn (246th Bn, CEF), (Note: Reserve) The Pictou Highlanders
The Pictou Highlanders	Disbanded
1st Bn, The Pictou Highlanders, CASF
Special Infy Coy (Pictou Highlanders), CASF
Disbanded	Disbanded
189th Light Anti-Aircraft Bty, RCA (Note: 28th Light Anti-Aircraft Regiment, RCA)

Parrsborough Corps
Disbanded
Independent infy coys
Cumberland Provisional Bn of Infy
93rd Cumberland Bn of Infy
93rd Cumberland Regt
70th Colchester and Hants Regt
76th Colchester and Hants Rifles
68th Regt
25th Bn, CEF	81st "Hants" Regt
106th "Overseas" Bn, CEF
193rd "Overseas" Bn, CEF	Absorbed by 40th "Overseas" Bn
Absorbed by 17th Reserve Bn
1st Bn (193rd Bn, CEF), The Cumberland Regt	Disbanded	1st Bn (25th Bn, CEF), The Colchester and Hants Regt	2nd Bn (106th Bn, CEF), The Colchester and Hants Regt
1st Bn (193rd Bn, CEF), The Cumberland Highlanders
C Coy, 6th MG Bn, CMGC
The North NS Highlanders (MG)	Disbanded
The North NS Highlanders, CASF
2nd (Reserve) Bn, The Pictou Highlanders	1st Bn, The North NS Highlanders, CASF	2nd (Reserve) Bn, The North NS Highlanders (MG)
3rd Bn, The North NS Highlanders, CIC, CAOF
The Pictou Highlanders (Motor)	Disbanded	The North NS Highlanders	Disbanded
"E" Coy, (Note: Regular Force) The North NS Highlanders	"F" Coy, The North NS Highlanders
Absorbed by 1st Canadian Highland Bn
Absorbed by 2nd Canadian Highland Bn
1st Bn, The NS Highlanders
1st Bn, The NS Highlanders (North)
The NS Highlanders
Perpetuates War of 1812 units

== Perpetuations ==
=== War of 1812 ===
- 1st Battalion, County of Sydney Regiment
- 2nd Battalion, County of Sydney Regiment
- 1st Battalion, Cumberland Regiment
- Parrsborough Corps

=== Great War ===
- 17th Battalion (Nova Scotia Highlanders), CEF
- 25th Battalion (Nova Scotia Rifles), CEF
- 106th Battalion (Nova Scotia Rifles), CEF
- 193rd Battalion (Nova Scotia Highlanders), CEF
- 246th Battalion (Nova Scotia Highlanders), CEF

== Operational history ==
=== South African War ===
The 193rd Cumberland Battalion of Infantry contributed volunteers for the Canadian Contingents during the South African War.

=== First World War ===
Details of the 76th Colchester and Hants Rifles, the 78th Pictou Regiment "Highlanders" and the 93rd Cumberland Regiment were placed on active service on 6 August 1914 for local protection duties.

The 17th Battalion (Nova Scotia Highlanders), CEF was authorized on 19 September 1914 and embarked for Great Britain on 29 September 1914 where it was redesignated as the 17th Reserve Battalion, CEF on 29 April 1915, to provide reinforcements for the Canadian Corps. The battalion was disbanded on 21 May 1917.

The 25th Battalion (Nova Scotia Rifles), CEF was authorized on 7 November 1914 and embarked for Great Britain on 20 May 1915. It disembarked in France on 16 September 1916, where it fought as part of the 5th Infantry Brigade, 2nd Canadian Division in France and Flanders until the end of the war. The battalion was disbanded on 15 September 1920.

The 106th Battalion (Nova Scotia Rifles), CEF was authorized on 22 December 1915 and embarked for Great Britain on 15 July 1916 where it provided reinforcements for the Canadian Corps until 5 October 1916, when its personnel were absorbed by the 40th Battalion, CEF. The battalion was disbanded on 8 December 1917.

The 193rd Battalion (Nova Scotia Highlanders), CEF, was authorized on 15 July 1916. It was based in Truro, Nova Scotia, and began recruiting during the winter of 1915/16 throughout Nova Scotia, one Cyril Wetmore recruiting more than 100 men "from Parrsboro to Apple River." It embarked for Great Britain on 12 October 1916 where it provided reinforcements for the Canadian Corps in the field until 20 January 1917, when its personnel were absorbed by the 17th Reserve Battalion. The battalion was disbanded on 18 February 1918.

It had one Officer Commanding: Lieutenant Colonel R. J. S. Langford, later commander of the Royal Canadian Regiment (1929-1935) and co-author of Corporal to Field Officer and Handbook of Canadian Military Law.

The 246th Battalion (Nova Scotia Highlanders), CEF was authorized on 1 May 1917 and embarked for Great Britain on 2 June 1917. On 9 June 1917, its personnel were absorbed by the 17th Reserve Battalion, CEF to provide reinforcements for the Canadian Corps in the field. The battalion was disbanded on 11 April 1918.

The distinguishing patch of the 25th Battalion (Nova Scotia Rifles), CEF.

=== Second World War ===
Details of The Pictou Highlanders were called out on service on 26 August 1939 and then placed on active service on 1 September 1939 as The Pictou Highlanders, Canadian Active Service Force (Details), for local protection duties. The details called out on active service disbanded on 31 December 1940.

The regiment mobilized the 1st Battalion, The Pictou Highlanders, CASF for active service on 1 January 1941. It served in Newfoundland from March to August 1943 in a home defence role as part of Atlantic Command. In September 1943, one company was despatched to the Bahamas, where it performed garrison duty until 28 March 1946. The battalion was disbanded on 30 April 1946.

On 10 September 1942, a sub-component of the regiment, designated Special Infantry Company (Pictou Highlanders), CASF, was mobilized for active service. It served in Bermuda on garrison duty from 12 November 1942 to 1 April 1946. The company disbanded on 30 April 1946.

Details of The North Nova Scotia Highlanders were called out on service on 26 August 1939 and then placed on active service on 1 September 1939 as The North Nova Scotia Highlanders (Machine Gun), CASF (Details), for local protection duties. The details called out on active service were disbanded on 31 December 1940.

The regiment subsequently mobilized The North Nova Scotia Highlanders, CASF for active service on 24 May 1940. It was redesignated as the 1st Battalion, The North Nova Scotia Highlanders, CASF on 7 November 1940. It embarked for Great Britain on 18 July 1941. On D-Day, 6 June 1944, it landed in Normandy as part of the 9th Infantry Brigade, 3rd Canadian Infantry Division, and it continued to fight in North-West Europe until the end of the war. The overseas battalion disbanded on 15 January 1946.

On 1 June 1945, the regiment mobilized the 3rd Battalion, The North Nova Scotia Highlanders, Canadian Infantry Corps, Canadian Army Occupation Force for service with the Canadian Army Occupation Force in Germany. The battalion disbanded on 1 May 1946.

=== Post-war ===
On 4 May 1951, the regiment mobilized two temporary Active Force companies designated "E" and "F".

"E" Company was reduced to nil strength upon its personnel being incorporated into the 1st Canadian Highland Battalion for service in Germany with the North Atlantic Treaty Organization and was disbanded on 29 July 1953. On 16 October 1953 the 1st Canadian Highland Battalion was redesignated the 1st Battalion, The Black Watch (Royal Highland Regiment) of Canada.

"F" Company was initially used as a reinforcement pool for "E" Company. On 15 May 1952, it was reduced to nil strength, upon its personnel being absorbed by the newly formed 2nd Canadian Highland Battalion for service in Korea with the United Nations. "F" Company was disbanded on 29 July 1953. On 16 October 1953 the 2nd Canadian Highland Battalion was redesignated the 2nd Battalion, The Black Watch (Royal Highland Regiment) of Canada.

=== War in Afghanistan ===
The regiment contributed an aggregate of more than 20% of its authorized strength to the various Task Forces which served in Afghanistan between 2002 and 2014.

== Battle honours ==
The Nova Scotia Highlanders have received 47 battle honours and 1 honorary distinction since the unit's inception. In the list below, battle honours in small capitals were awarded for participation in large operations and campaigns, while those in lowercase indicate honours granted for more specific battles.

War of 1812
Non-emblazonable honorary distinction Defence of Canada – 1812–1815 – Défense du Canada
South African War
South Africa, 1899–1900
First World War
- Ypres, 1915
- Festubert, 1915
- Mount Sorrel
- Somme, 1916
- Flers–Courcelette
- Thiepval
- Ancre Heights
- Arras, 1917
- Vimy, 1917
- Arleux
- Scarpe, 1917
- Hill 70
- Ypres, 1917
- Passchendaele
- Somme, 1918
- Amiens
- Arras, 1918
- Scarpe, 1918
- Hindenburg Line
- Canal du Nord
- Cambrai, 1918
- Pursuit to Mons
- France and Flanders, 1915–18
Second World War
- Normandy Landing
- Authie
- Caen
- The Orne
- Bourguébus Ridge
- Faubourg de Vaucelles
- Verrières Ridge–Tilly-la-Campagne
- Falaise
- The Laison
- Chambois
- Boulogne, 1944
- Calais, 1944
- The Scheldt
- Savojaards Plaat
- Breskens Pocket
- The Rhineland
- Waal Flats
- The Hochwald
- The Rhine
- Zutphen
- Leer
- North-West Europe, 1944–1945
South-West Asia
Afghanistan

== Photo gallery ==
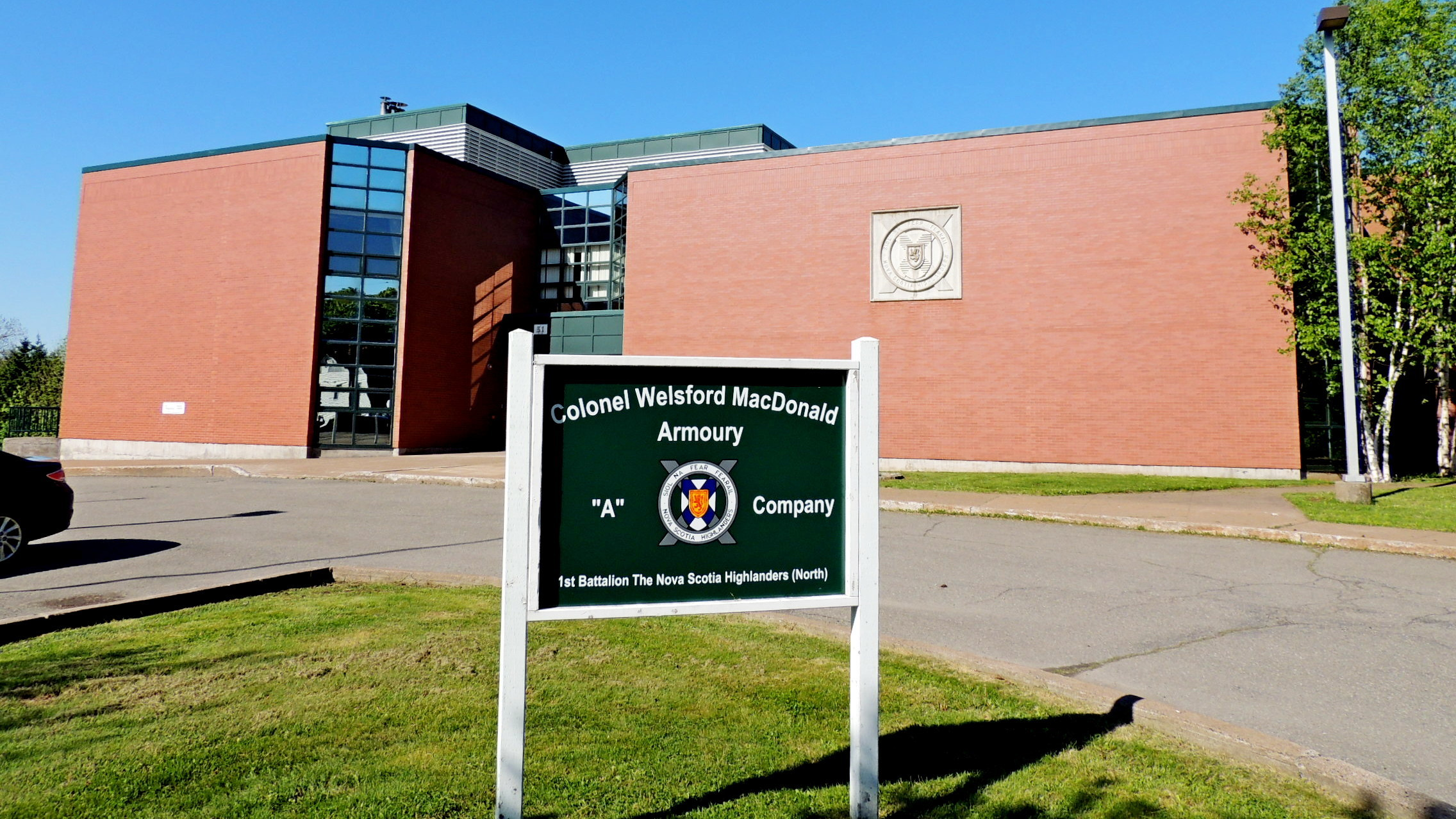
Colonel John Welsford MacDonald Armoury - A Company, Pictou, Nova Scotia

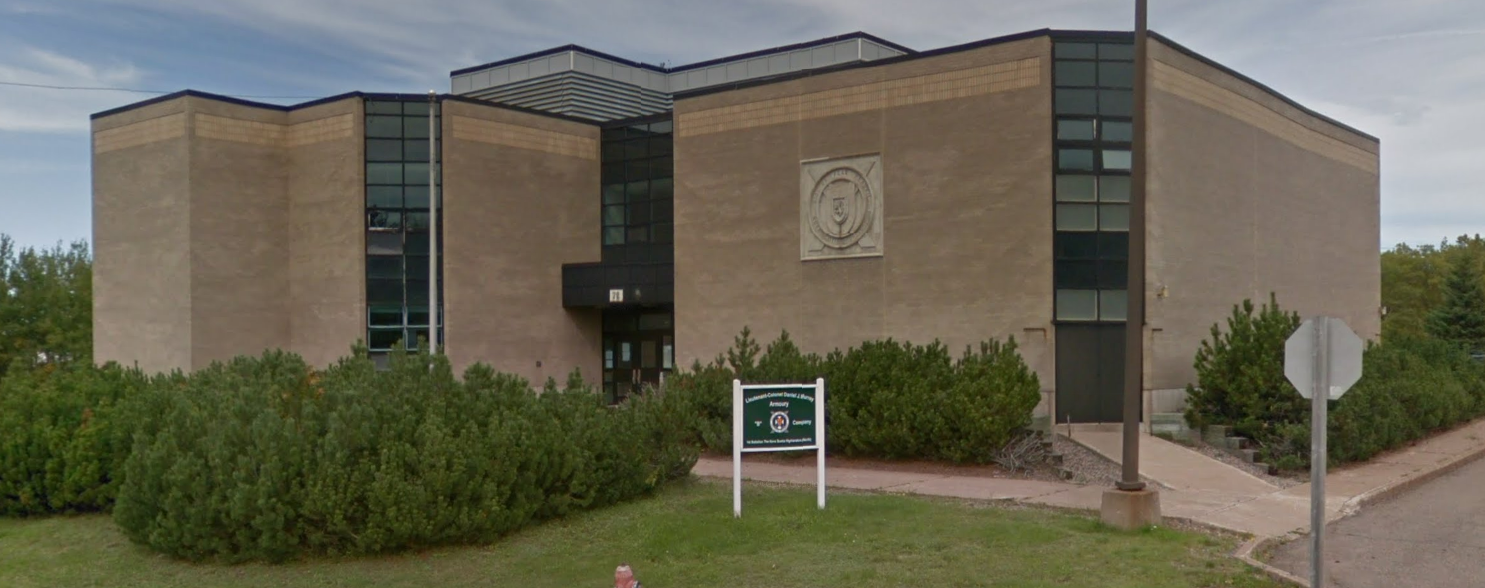
Lieutenant Colonel Daniel J Murray Armoury - B Company, Springhill, Nova Scotia

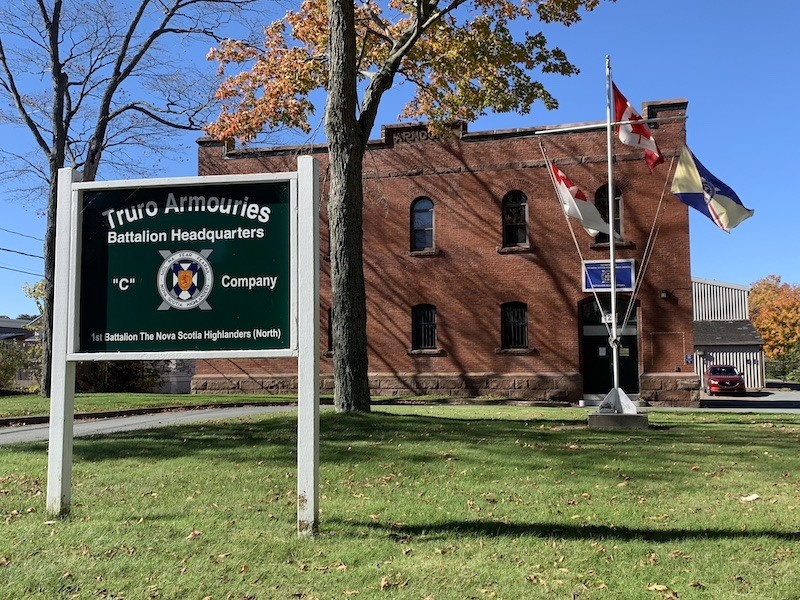
Regimental Headquarters and C Company Armouries, Truro, Nova Scotia

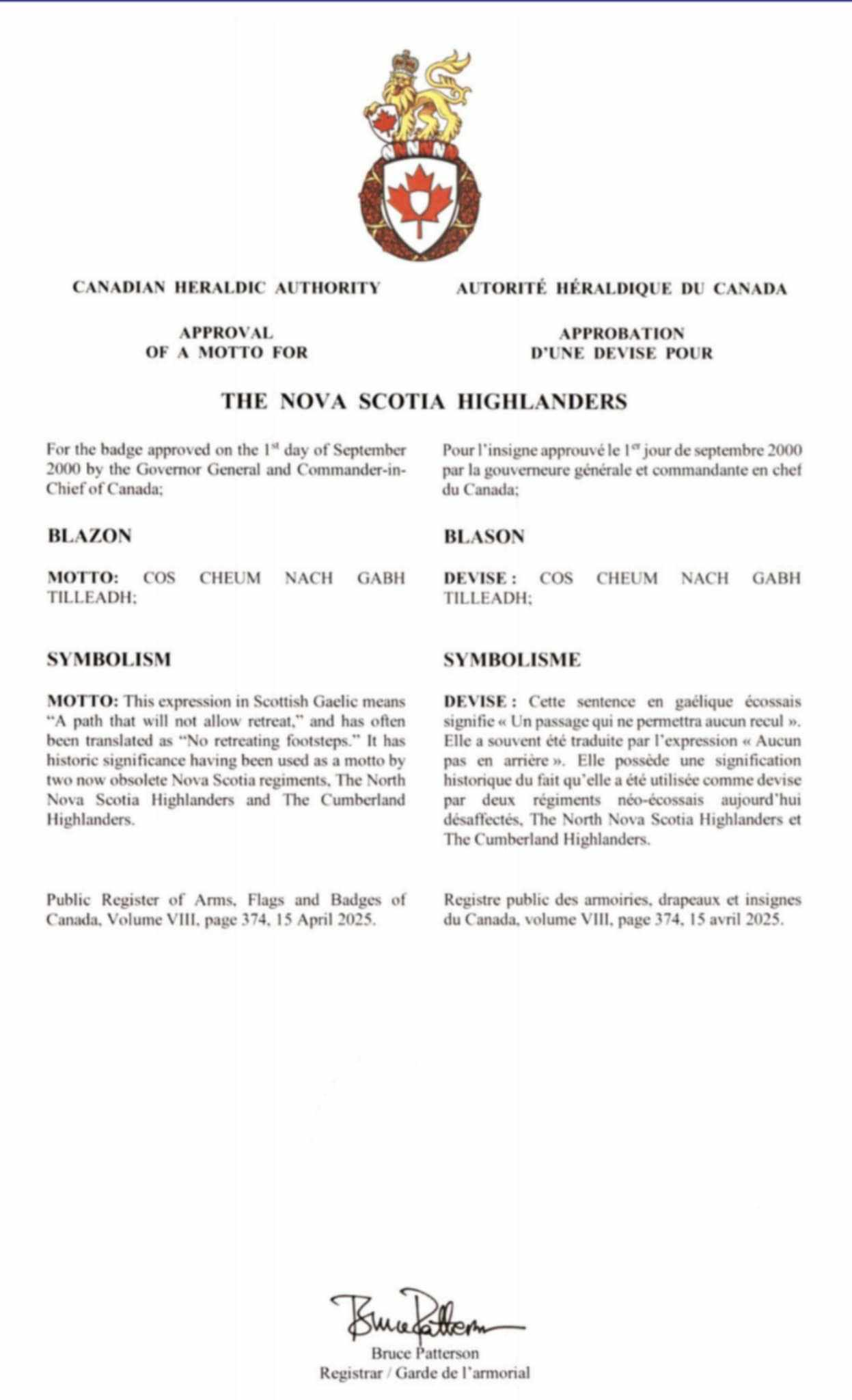
Canadian Heraldic Authority approval for changing the motto. 15 April 2025

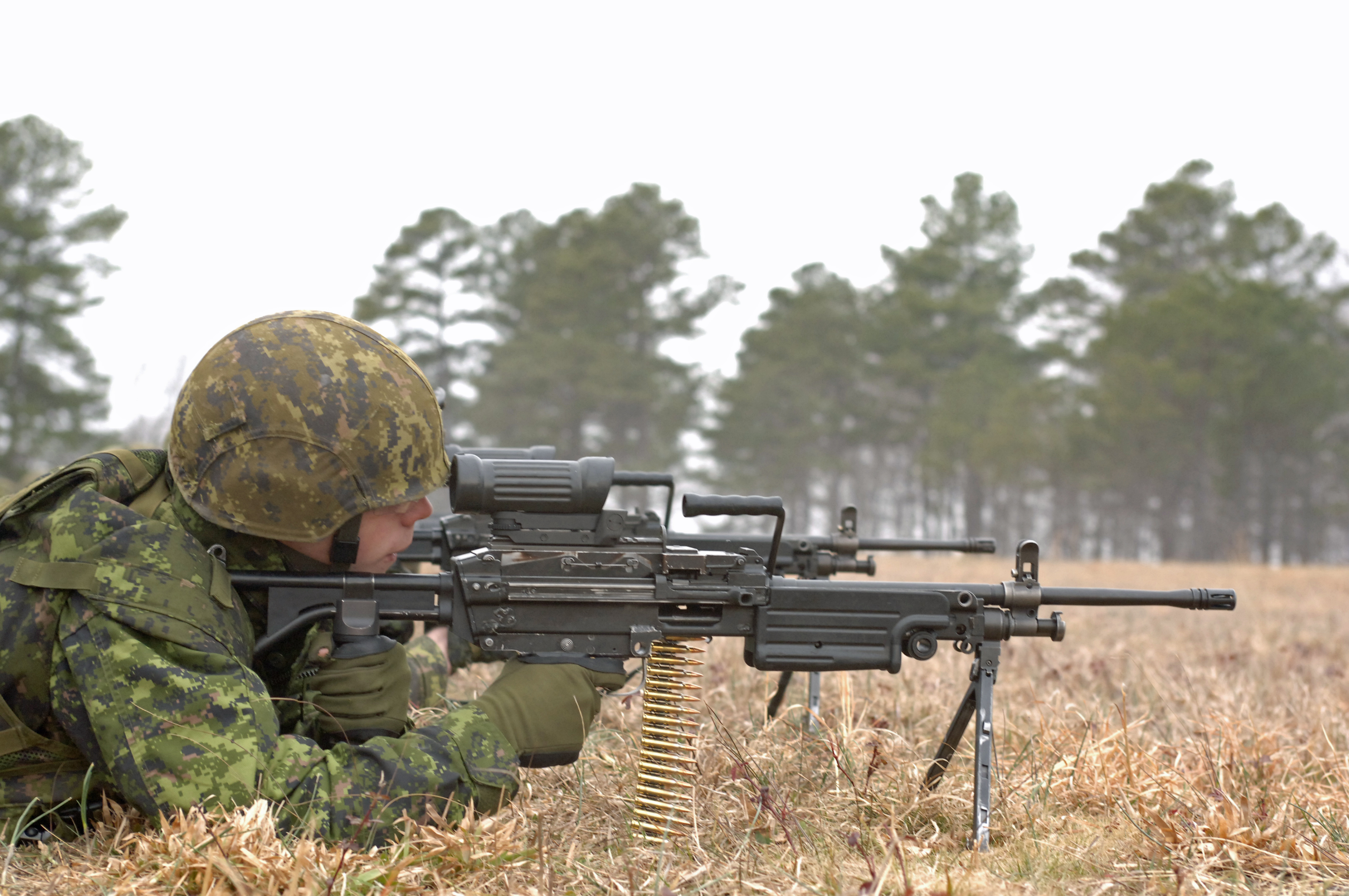
Jesse Mackenzie, from 1st Battalion, Nova Scotia Highlanders (North), adjusts the sights on his C9 machine gun at the range

== Armouries ==
Site	Date(s)	Designated	Location	Description	Image
Colonel Welsford MacDonald Armoury			31 Union Street, Pictou, Nova Scotia	*Housing The Nova Scotia Highlanders, A Company, this centrally located building has a flat roof	
Lieutenant Colonel Daniel J Murray Armoury			72 North Street, Springhill, Nova Scotia	*Housing The Nova Scotia Highlanders, B Company, this centrally located building has a flat roof	
Truro Armoury	1874 Thomas Seaton Scott	Canada's Register of Historic Places; Recognized - 1991 Register of the Government of Canada Heritage Buildings	126 Willow Street, Truro, Nova Scotia	*Housing The Nova Scotia Highlanders, HQ and C Company, this centrally located box-like Dominion style Neo-Gothic style building with a flat roof was designed with classical inspiration.	

== See also ==
- Canadian-Scottish regiment
- West Nova Scotia Regiment
- List of armouries in Canada
- Military history of Nova Scotia
- Military history of Canada
- History of the Canadian Army

== Order of precedence ==
Preceded by The North Shore (New Brunswick) Regiment	The Nova Scotia Highlanders	Succeeded by Le Régiment de Maisonneuve
