= North West Europe campaign =

The North West Europe campaign was a campaign by the British Commonwealth armed forces in North West Europe, including its skies and adjoining waters during World War II. The term Western Front has also sometimes been used informally. The United States military refers to this campaign as the European Theater of Operations.

Hence the battle honour "North-West Europe" was awarded to any unit involved in land, sea and air campaigns and operations in, over or near Belgium, Denmark, France, Germany, Luxembourg, Netherlands, Norway and the United Kingdom during World War II. It includes many more specific campaigns and/or battle honours.

== Subsidiary battle honours ==
The battle honour "North-West Europe campaign of 1940, was awarded to some army units that were involved in the Battle of France, and was restricted to the Belgian and French Channel ports. During this campaign, the French Army was responsible for the rest of the Western Front from Luxembourg to Switzerland, much of which was defended by the Maginot Line. The first campaign ended for the British forces with the defeat of the British Expeditionary Force (BEF) and its evacuation from the beaches of Dunkirk.

Between 1940 and 1944, Commonwealth army units conducted coastal raids in German-Occupied Europe, the largest of which was the Dieppe raid of 1942.

British Commonwealth air force units who served over Occupied Europe, between the fall of France and D-Day were awarded the battle honour "Fortress Europe 1940–1944."

The battle honour North-West Europe campaign of 1944–45, was typically awarded to units of the British Second Army and First Canadian Army, as elements of the British 21st Army Group. The campaign started with the landings in Normandy and ended on 4 May 1945 with Field Marshal Bernard Montgomery taking the German military surrender of all German forces in the Netherlands, north west Germany and Denmark on Lüneburg Heath, (situated between the cities of Hamburg, Hanover and Bremen).
