= 36 Canadian Brigade Group Band =

The 36 Canadian Brigade Group (NS) band, a voluntary musical unit that serves as the de facto Canadian Army brass and reed military band in Nova Scotia. Being part of the 36 Canadian Brigade Group, it is the only one that is operationally attached to a brigade. It therefore gives musical accompaniment to all units in its jurisdiction, including regiments with regimental bands such as the 1st Battalion, Royal Newfoundland Regiment.

The band participates several activities:

- Military parades
- Concerts
- National holidays (i.e. Remembrance Day, Canada Day and Canadian Armed Forces Day)
- Provincial holidays (i.e. Nova Scotia Heritage Day)
- Presentation of Colours (regimental)
- Military funerals

Some of its first major events include Royal Nova Scotia International Tattoo, a ceremony it participates regularly event today.

It was founded in the 70s as the Halifax Militia Band. It was converted into its present-day form in 1992 upon the creation of the brigade. Senior members of the band have included Patrick Forde, who was director of music from 2001 to 2006 and the Inspector of reserve bands in Eastern Canada as well as Terry Mumford, who served as assistant director of music.

== LFAA Band ==
The Land Force Atlantic Area Band was founded in 1975 in Aldershot, Nova Scotia. It serves as an associated band of the 36 CBG Band. The reservist band in its early years spent summers touring throughout Eastern Canada performing in local parades while representing Land Force Atlantic Area Training Centre Aldershot and the larger Nova Scotia Militia District. Members from other atlantic area Army bands are also part of the 33-strong band, and include musicians from units such as The Prince Edward Island Regiment (RCAC), the Royal Newfoundland Regiment and the 3 Field Artillery.
