= 246th Battalion (Nova Scotia Highlanders), CEF =

The 246th (Nova Scotia Highlanders) Battalion, CEF was a unit in the Canadian Expeditionary Force during the First World War. Based in Halifax, Nova Scotia, the unit began recruiting in the summer of 1916 throughout the province of Nova Scotia. The unit sent two drafts to England in April and June 1917, both of which were absorbed into the 17th Reserve Battalion, CEF upon arrival. The 246th (Nova Scotia Highlanders) Battalion, CEF had one Officer Commanding: Lieut-Col. N. H. Parsons.

The battalion was originally perpetuated by the Pictou Highlanders and is now perpetuated by their successor The Nova Scotia Highlanders.
