= 185th Canadian Infantry Battalion (Cape Breton Highlanders), CEF =

The 185th (Cape Breton Highlanders) Battalion, CEF was a unit in the Canadian Expeditionary Force during the First World War.

== History ==
The 185th (Cape Breton Highlanders) Battalion, CEF was authorized on 15 July 1916. Based in Broughton, Nova Scotia, the unit began recruiting during the winter of 1915/16 throughout Cape Breton Island, Nova Scotia and embarked for Great Britain on 12 October 1916. There it provided reinforcements for the Canadian Corps in the field until 15 February 1918, when its personnel were absorbed by the 17th Reserve Battalion. The battalion was subsequently disbanded on 29 November 1918.

The 185th (Cape Breton Highlanders) Battalion, CEF had one officer commanding: Lieutenant-Colonel Frank Parker Day.

In 1920 the perpetuation of the battalion was assigned to the Cape Breton Highlanders.

== See also ==
- Military history of Nova Scotia
