= Cumberland Highlanders =

- Active: 1871–1936
- Country: Canada
- Branch: Canadian Militia
- Type: Line Infantry
- Role: Infantry
- Size: One Regiment
- Part of: Non-Permanent Active Militia
- Garrison/HQ: Amherst, Nova Scotia
- Motto: Cos Cheum Nach Gabh Tilleadh (Scottish Gaelic for 'Our footsteps will not allow us to go backwards')
- Engagements: Second Boer War; First World War
- Battle honours: See #Battle Honours

The Cumberland Highlanders was an infantry regiment of the Non-Permanent Active Militia of the Canadian Militia (now the Canadian Army). In 1936, the regiment was amalgamated with the Colchester and Hants Regiment to form the North Nova Scotia Highlanders.

== Lineage ==
- Originated on 6 April 1871, in Amherst, Cumberland County, Nova Scotia, as the Cumberland Provisional Battalion of Infantry.
- Redesignated on 12 June 1885, as the 93rd Cumberland Battalion of Infantry.
- Redesignated on 8 May 1900, as the 93rd Cumberland Regiment.
- Redesignated on 29 March 1920, as the Cumberland Regiment.
- Redesignated on 15 June 1927, as the Cumberland Highlanders.
- Amalgamated on 1 December 1936, with the Colchester and Hants Regiment (less C Company) and C Company of the 6th Machine Gun Battalion, CMGC (now the Princess Louise Fusiliers), and redesignated as the North Nova Scotia Highlanders (Machine Gun).

== History ==
=== Early history ===
On 6 April 1871, the Cumberland Provisional Battalion of Infantry was organized from four independent companies in Amherst; River Philip; Maccan and River Herbert, Tidnish, Nova Scotia.

On 12 June 1885, the battalion was redesignated as the 93rd Cumberland Battalion of Infantry.

=== South African War ===
During the South African War, the 93rd Cumberland Battalion of Infantry contributed volunteers for the Canadian Contingents, most notably for the 2nd (Special Service) Battalion, Royal Canadian Regiment.

=== Early 1900s ===
As a part of the country-wide reorganization of the Canadian Militia at the start of the 20th century, on 8 May 1900, the regiment was redesignated as the 93rd Cumberland Regiment.

=== First World War ===
On 15 July 1916, the 193rd Battalion (Nova Scotia Highlanders), CEF was authorized for service and on 12 October 1916, the battalion embarked for Great Britain. After its arrival in the UK, the battalion provided reinforcements for the Canadian Corps in the field. On 20 January 1917, the battalion's personnel were absorbed by the 17th Reserve Battalion, CEF. On 18 February 1918, the 193rd Battalion, CEF was disbanded.

=== 1920s–1930s ===
After the war the regiment was granted the perpetuation of the 193rd Battalion (Nova Scotia Highlanders), CEF.

On 1 April 1920, as a result of the reorganization of the Canadian Militia following the Otter Commission, the 93rd Cumberland Regiment was redesignated as the Cumberland Regiment.

On 16 June 1927, the regiment was redesignated as the Cumberland Highlanders.

On 1 December 1936, as a result of the 1936 Canadian Militia Reorganization, the Cumberland Highlanders were amalgamated with the Colchester and Hants Regiment and “C” Company of the 6th Machine Gun Battalion, CMGC, to form the North Nova Scotia Highlanders (Machine Gun) (now part of the Nova Scotia Highlanders).

== Battle honours ==
South African War

- South Africa, 1899–1900

Great War

- Arras, 1917, '18
- Ypres, 1917
- Amiens
- Hindenburg Line
- Pursuit to Mons

Of the First World War honors, "Arras, 1917;" "Amiens," the "Hindenburg Line," and the "Pursuit to Mons" were selected to be borne on colours and appointments.

== See also ==
- Canadian-Scottish regiment
