= PEIR =

PEIR may refer to:

- Prince Edward Island Regiment, an armoured reconnaissance regiment in the Canadian Forces primary reserve
- Prince Edward Island Railway, an historic railway in Canada
