= Prince Edward Island Highlanders =

The Prince Edward Island Highlanders
- Active: 1875–1946
- Country: Canada
- Branch: Canadian Militia (1871-1940); Canadian Army (1940-1946)
- Type: Line infantry
- Role: Infantry
- Size: One battalion
- Part of: Non-Permanent Active Militia (1871-1940); Royal Canadian Infantry Corps (1942-1946)
- Garrison/HQ: Charlottetown, Prince Edward Island
- Mottos: Latin: semper fidelis, lit. 'always faithful'
- Colors: Facing colour blue
- March: Quick – Highland Laddie
- Engagements: South African War; First World War; Second World War
- Battle honours: See #Battle honours

Insignia
- Tartan: Government

The Prince Edward Island Highlanders was an infantry regiment of the Canadian Army. In 1946, the regiment was amalgamated with The Prince Edward Island Light Horse to form The Prince Edward Island Regiment (RCAC).

== Lineage ==
=== The Prince Edward Island Highlanders ===
- Originated on 25 June 1875, in Charlottetown, Prince Edward Island, as the Queen's County Provisional Battalion of Infantry.
- Amalgamated on 30 June 1876, with the Charlottetown Provisional Battalion of Infantry and redesignated as the Queen's County Battalion of Infantry.
- Redesignated on 4 October 1878, as the 82nd Queen's County Battalion of Infantry.
- Redesignated on 8 May 1900, as the 82nd Queen's County Regiment.
- Redesignated on 5 June 1906, as the 82nd Abegweit Light Infantry.
- Redesignated on 29 March 1920, as The Prince Edward Island Regiment.
- Redesignated on 15 June 1927, as The Prince Edward Island Highlanders.
- Redesignated on 1 January 1941, as the 2nd (Reserve) Battalion, The Prince Edward Island Highlanders.
- Redesignated on 1 June 1945, as The Prince Edward Island Highlanders.
- Converted to armour and amalgamated on 1 April 1946, with the 17th (Reserve) Armoured Regiment (Prince Edward Island Light Horse), RCAC and redesignated as the 17th (Prince Edward Island) Reconnaissance Regiment (now The Prince Edward Island Regiment (RCAC))

=== The Charlottetown Provisional Battalion of Infantry ===
- Originated on 2 July 1875, in Charlottetown, Prince Edward Island, as the Charlottetown Provisional Battalion of Infantry.
- Amalgamated on 30 June 1876, with the Queen's County Provisional Battalion of Infantry and redesignated as the Queen's County Battalion of Infantry.

== Perpetuations ==
- 105th Battalion (Prince Edward Island Highlanders), CEF

== History ==
=== Early history ===
Founded in 1875 as the Queen's County Provisional Battalion of Infantry, it went through several name changes, being renamed the Queen's County Battalion of Infantry in 1876, the 82nd Queen's County Battalion of Infantry in 1879, the 82nd Abegweit Light Infantry in 1906, and The Prince Edward Island Regiment in 1920. It acquired its final title in 1927. Abegweit is a Mi'kmaq word translating to 'cradled on the waves' as a reference to Prince Edward Island.

=== South African War ===
During the Second Boer War, the 82nd Queen's County Regiment contributed volunteers for the Canadian contingents in the field.

=== First World War ===
On 6 August 1914, Details from the 82nd Abegweit Light Infantry were placed on active service for local protection duties.

On 22 December 1915, the 105th Battalion (Prince Edward Island Highlanders), CEF was authorized for service and on 16 July 1916, the battalion embarked for Great Britain. After its arrival in the UK, the battalion provided reinforcements to the Canadian Corps in the field. On 24 January 1917, the battalion was amalgamated with 104th Battalion, CEF. On 12 October 1917, the 105th Battalion, CEF was officially disbanded.

=== Second World War ===
Parts of the regiment were placed on active service on 1 September 1939 for local protective duty and 1st Battalion was mobilized on 1 January 1941. The unit served in Newfoundland from 1941 to 1943. From 1943 to 1945, the 1st Battalion, Prince Edward Island Highlanders, served as part of the 15th Canadian Infantry Brigade Group, 6th Canadian Infantry Division in the home defence role of the west coast of Canada. In early 1945 after the need for home defence was not as great, the battalion embarked for the United Kingdom where it was disbanded shortly after arrival to provide reinforcements in the field to the First Canadian Army. A reserve battalion remained on Prince Edward Island.

=== Post War ===
On 1 April 1946, The Prince Edward Island Highlanders were amalgamated with the Prince Edward Island Light Horse to form the 17th (Prince Edward Island) Reconnaissance Regiment. and renamed as The Prince Edward Island Regiment (RCAC) in 1949.

== Organization ==
=== The Prince Edward Island Regiment (2 May 1921) ===
- 1st Battalion (perpetuating the 105th Battalion, CEF)
- 2nd (Reserve) Battalion

=== The Prince Edward Island Highlanders (15 June 1927) ===
- Regimental Headquarters (Charlottetown, PEI)
- A Company (Charlottetown, PEI)
- B Company (New Wiltshire, PEI)
- C Company (Summerside, PEI)
- D Company (Montaque, PEI)

== Alliances ==
United Kingdom - The Black Watch (Royal Highland Regiment) (until 1946)

== Uniform ==
The Prince Edward Island Highlanders were kitted as Black Watch except for badges. Officers wore grey Balmorals in service dress and battle dress.

== Battle honours ==
=== South African War ===
- South Africa, 1900

=== Great War ===
- Arras, 1917, '18 (Note: "Arras, 1918" selected to be borne on colours and appointments)
- Ypres, 1917
- Amiens (Note: Selected to be borne on colours and appointments)
- Hindenburg Line
- Pursuit to Mons

== Notable members ==
- Daniel J. MacDonald

== See also ==
- Canadian-Scottish regiment

== Notes and references ==
- Barnes, RM, The Uniforms and History of the Scottish Regiments, London, Sphere Books Limited, 1972.
