= Canadian Expeditionary Force artillery from Prince Edward Island =

The PEI Gunners 1914–1918
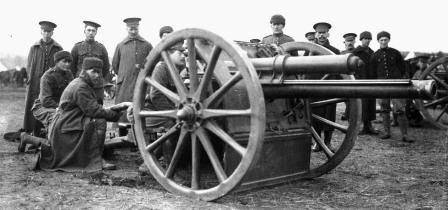
- A Canadian Artillery Ordnance QF 18-pounder Field Gun at Camp Valcartier in 1914
- Active: 25 June 1875
- Country: Canada
- Branch: Non-Permanent Active Militia
- Type: Garrison Artillery
- Size: Battery
- Garrison/HQ: Prince Edward Island
- Engagements: World War 1

A number of militia artillery batteries were raised in Prince Edward Island from 1875. When the First World War broke out, three battery-sized units were raised and deployed from the island as part of the Canadian Expeditionary Force.

== Garrison Artillery in Prince Edward Island ==
From 1763, with the close of the Seven Years' War, the British government began stationing its 'regular army troops', and foreign troops in service, on the Island. The first artillery units on the Island of Saint John were manned by a mix of Royal Regiment of (Garrison) Artillery British regulars, Island volunteers and the colonial militia until 1871. In 1871, as British troops departed Canada, an initial permanent active militia element of Canadian Artillery emerged, on 20 October 1871, with the formation of two batteries of garrison artillery in Kingston and Quebec City.

In 1875, having joined The Dominion, with most of the Island colonial units deactivated, and as the 'Canadian' militia reorganized; new PEI 'active militia' units were authorized. In Military District No.12 (PEI), two batteries of artillery were stood-up, the Charlottetown Battery of Garrison Artillery (OC Major J.B. Pollard) and the Georgetown Battery of Garrison Artillery (OC Captain C. Owen). Recognizing significant success in recruiting in the capital city, a second battery was authorized in Charlottetown, necessitating the first of may re-designations: No.1 Charlottetown Battery of Garrison Artillery (General Order No. 17 – 25 June 1875) and No.2 Charlottetown Battery of Garrison Artillery (OC Major Morris).

As reported by the 'District' Inspector of Artillery (Maritime Provinces) and by Lieutenant Colonel J.H. Gray, on the state of the militia in PEI, they acknowledged an existing fourth Island battery, the Summerside Battery of Garrison Artillery (authorized MGO G.O. 21 No.1 – 13 August 1875). The previously 'independent' city and county batteries were 'gathered together' in March 1882, when the 'Prince Edward Island Provisional Brigade of Garrison Artillery' was authorized. Initially composed with an establishment of three Batteries, No.1 and No.2 in Charlottetown and No.3 in Georgetown, the PEI Brigade soon added No.4 Battery in Souris (24 Jan 1884), and No.5 Battery in Montague (17 October 1884). The 'PEI Garrison Brigade' ended its early history of re-designations, in June 1912, when it was designated the 'Prince Edward Island Heavy Brigade, Canadian Garrison Artillery', composed of the 3rd Heavy Battery CGA and 4th Heavy Battery CGA, in Charlottetown. While the Georgetown, Souris and Montague 'Garrison Artillery Batteries' came together as the 37th (Souris) Battery, Canadian Field Artillery.

With the coming of the First World War, applying the lessons of South Africa, the 'Canadian Permanent Force' field gunners moved in adopting the British model of designating their batteries as either 'Horse Artillery' or 'Field Artillery'. The newly designated 'Royal Canadian Horse Artillery' equipped with the light Ordnance QF 13-pounder (quick-firing) field gun, assumed the 'all mounted, highly mobile' task. Many Non-Permanent Active Militia gunner units became designated as 'Canadian Field Artillery' taking-up the 'less mobile, limber riding' task, equipped with the heavier Ordnance QF 18-pounder, and others remained standing as a 'heavy gun - garrison battery' designated as 'Canadian Garrison Artillery' (not being allocated guns). As 'Canadian Garrison Artillery' was rearranged and divided into - Movable, Coast Defence, and Heavy or Siege Batteries / Companies, following arrangements in Britain, the Heavy or Siege Batteries were to become equipped with new howitzers. Designed and engineered to fire large calibre high explosive shells in high trajectory, (down) plunging fire, the howitzers designated for Siege Batteries were to be six-inch, eight-inch or 9.2-inch calibre.

== No. 2 Canadian (Overseas) Siege Artillery Battery, CEF ==
No.2 Canadian (Overseas) Siege Artillery Battery
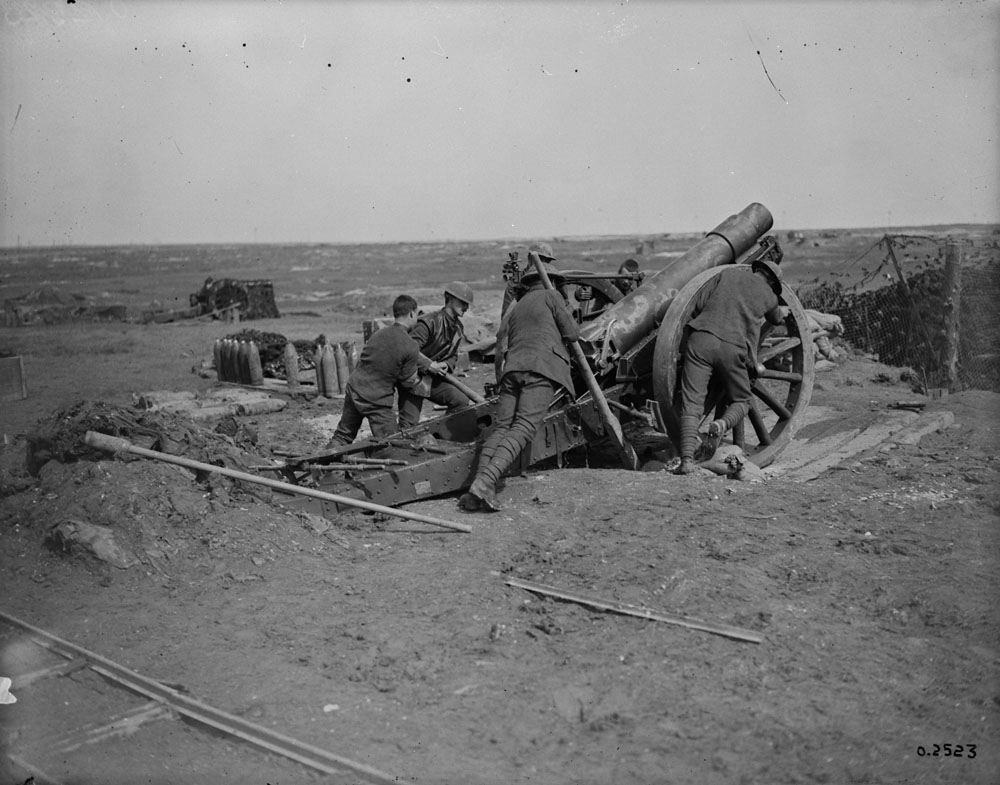
- A crew positioning a BL 6-inch 26 cwt howitzer, February 1918
- Active: 20 April 1915 – 1 November 1920
- Branch: Canadian Garrison Artillery
- Type: Corps Heavy Artillery
- Role: Siege Artillery
- Size: Battery
- Part of: Canadian Expeditionary Force
- Garrison/HQ: Charlottetown, PEI

Commanders
- First Officer Commanding: Major A.G. Peake (Charlottetown, PEI)
- Second Officer Commanding: Major W.B. Prowse (Charlottetown Royalty, PEI)

What was to become a PEI recruited Canadian Garrison Artillery Siege Battery, mobilized at Charlottetown, had an initially approved manning of 5 officers and 161 other ranks. 'Created' by Order-in-Council PC 2831, in November 1914, and authorized by Militia Headquarters (Ottawa), on 20 April 1915, No. 2 Heavy Battery Depot (Charlottetown), as it was first designated, was charged with recruiting replacements for No. 2 Heavy Battery (Halifax). "Most of the officers, and many of the men, who joined the battery, had served in the PEI Heavy Brigade ...", "... with a few from New Brunswick and Nova Scotia, Great Britain and the United States." The unit was first quartered in the Agricultural Building, in Charlottetown, being instructed in the workings of the 4.9-inch gun, and until late fall was then stationed in tents on the Armoury grounds, on Brighton Road, first commanded by Major A.G. Peake, who was to take it to England.

"By 1 September there were enough volunteers to begin training at Brighton Camp, 200 strong; the Battery was a cross-section of the Island's population ...", though just before leaving for overseas a draft of regulars from the Royal Garrison Artillery were attached to the unit. On 25 September 1915, it was authorized to recruit a battery ammunition party and base (support) details, which brought the strength of the unit to 218 all ranks, and on 29 September, the battery was re-designated as No. 2 Overseas Battery, Canadian Siege Artillery. After a grand farewell in Charlottetown, on 26 November, the battery moved out of Charlottetown, on the "SS Northumberland" to Pictou, NS and Halifax. It soon embarked on the "SS Lapland" sailing on 28 November, it arrived at Plymouth Sound, on 5 December, then with an increased strength of 6 officers and 273 other ranks.

It proceeded immediately to Raffey Camp, at Horsham Siege Artillery School, in West Sussex, and was in training there, for four months, until 12 April 1916, when it moved to a second RGA School and Ranges in Lydd, Kent, for firing and ranging practices. Still under training, and not yet assigned to a Canadian formation, to conform to the system of numbering British heavy RGA batteries, the battery was re-designated as No. 98 (Canadian) Siege Battery, Canadian Siege Brigade, from 29 February 1916.

Prior to proceeding to France, Major W.B. Prowse was selected and appointed Officer Commanding, later Major S.T. Layton and then Major H.R.N. Corbett, as the Officers Commanding, succeeding him. On 18 May, it moved to Stockcross, in Berkshire, where it sourced four of the newly produced BL 6-inch 26 cwt howitzer. On 31 May, the battery crossed the Channel from Southampton on board the S.S. "KING EDWARD", disembarking at Le Havre. Landing in France on 1 June 1916, it was the first unit of Canadian (garrison) siege artillery to cross the Channel.

The battery moved forward, and as part of the 2nd Brigade, CGA, quickly coming into service, organized with a Right and Left Section, at Sailly-au-Bois, firing its first rounds on 16 June 1916. Operating outside of the Canadian Corps, reflecting the nature in the employment of for much of the Dominion garrison artillery, first at Verdun, as successive BEF Corps' were engaged or moved, the battery remained actively engaged: from 5 June to 4 July 1916, it was detailed to VII Corps(UK) Heavy Artillery; from 4 July to 3 September 1916, during the battles of Albert and Bazentin Ridge, it was detailed to XV Corps (UK) Heavy Artillery; as from 4 September to 11 December 1916, it was detailed to a third Corps (UK) Heavy Artillery Group.

"Before the Somme Offensive ended in the fall of 1916, (where it had been continuously engaged), the battery would lose five killed and ten wounded, and before the War was over it would bury over 30 men". The 2nd Siege Battery, then designated the 98th Canadian, served continuously behind the UK 4th Army's front, serving in the BEF, from their entry into operations until December 1916, when ordered to dig their guns out of the mud and move northward.

In January 1917, the battery becoming part of the Canadian Corps Heavy Artillery, it was renamed No. 2 Canadian Siege Battery, Canadian Garrison Artillery, on 29 January 1917. The battery was engaged in the Battle of Vimy Ridge as part of Counter-Battery (Fire) Group No.3, 2nd Canadian Heavy Artillery Group, before soon being moved to 57th Heavy Artillery Group. At Vimy Ridge, the Canadian Corps Heavy Artillery consisted of eighteen heavy, twenty-six medium, nine 60-pounder, and two BL 6-inch Mk VII naval gun batteries, formed into eight siege and three counter-battery fire groups. Following the action on Vimy Ridge, the battery was again significantly engaged in the Canadian Corps action in the taking of Hill 70, just east of Loos and north of Lens, again as part of a reconstituted 2nd Canadian Heavy Group, in August 1917.

Having been detailed to the Canadian Corps Heavy Artillery, at Angres on 12 December 1916, it remained with the Canadian Corps until a move from 11 October 1917. Reassigned to the BEF, firing at Levin, from 12 to 20 October 1917, it was detailed to V Corps (UK) Heavy Artillery; and then a Ypres, from 21 October to 19 November 1917, it was detailed to first the 48th and then the 68th Group Canadian Corps Heavy Artillery; and again with the BEF, from 20 November to 10 December 1917, it was detailed to VIII Corps (UK) Heavy Artillery, having remained in Ypres.

Ever flexible, it rejoined the Canadian Corps on 16 December 1917, first engaged at Artois, the battery continued with the Canadian Heavy Artillery until the termination of the war, initially assigned to the 1st Canadian Heavy Artillery Group and, then on 22 December, it joined 2nd Canadian Heavy Brigade. In January 1918, two additional howitzers were received, bringing the battery's establishment to six BL 6-inch howitzers. Not directly engaged, positioned on the north flank of the battle, in responding to the 1918 German spring offensive in West Flanders, the battery was in action in the Hundred Days Offensive starting in August, moving frequently, through the Hindenburg Line, and advancing north during the Battle of Cambrai (1918) into October. No. 2 Canadian (Overseas) Siege Battery, 2nd Heavy Brigade, was in readiness ten miles west of Mons, in Thuin, when the Armistice was declared, with a strength of 7 officers and 189 other ranks.

It moved into Germany, ready for engagement, during the initial stage of the Occupation of the Rhineland, crossing the German frontier on 9 December. On 12 December, it went into position on the west bank of the Rhine at Cologne protecting the crossing of the 1st Canadian Division, over the new south bridge on 13 December 1918, under command of Major L.C. Ord. The battery left the continent from France on 30 March 1919, via Le Havre and into the UK at Weymouth.

It remained based at Witley Camp, until it sailed from Southampton on board the "RMS Mauretania (1906)" on 3 May 1919. It arrived at Halifax, NS, on 9 May and was demobilized at Charlottetown (and Kingston, ON) in May 1919, now under Major J.P. Hooper MC, as Officer Commanding. As all CEF active service units were administered on paper, as No.2 Heavy Battery Depot, it was disbanded on 1 November 1920. No. 2 Canadian (Overseas) Siege Artillery Battery, CEF is perpetuated by The Prince Edward Island Regiment (RCAC).

The Officer Commanding: Major W.B. Prowse, DSO

Waldron (Waldrum) Brewer Prowse was born on 14 June 1873 at Brackley Point Road, in Lot 33, on Prince Edward Island. He lived with his family in Charlottetown Royalty, as a youth, an accomplished athlete, he later worked in his brothers' company, Prowse Brothers Ltd, as a merchant, until going overseas.

Listed as Captain in the then 4th PEI Regiment (Heavy Brigade), while training in England and immediately prior to crossing to France, with No. 2 Siege Battery, on promotion, he was appointed its Officer Commanding. Detailed to the Somme, commanding his unit in action, for an extended period of engaged and continuous action, without relief, his service was recognized in the award of the Distinguished Service Order.

Giving up command, on 15 December 1917, Major Prowse returned to England, attended the ten-week 'Battalion Commanders Course' at the 'Senior Officers' School' at Aldershot and returned to France, being promoted to Lieutenant-Colonel. On 25 February 1918, he was appointed Officer Commanding 1st Brigade, Canadian Garrison Artillery, responsible for coordinating the actions of now four siege batteries, a command he retained until demobilization on 23 February 1919.

While in command, three times additionally Mentioned in Dispatches, the war cost Lt-Colonel Prowse his health, for not since returning to PEI, was he entirely well. In addition to business interests with his brother, he became successful in fox farming, and was an early automobile dealer in Charlottetown. At 63, on 15 January 1937, he died in Charlottetown, PEI.

== No. 8 Canadian (Overseas) Siege Artillery Battery, CEF ==
No.8 Canadian (Overseas) Siege Artillery Battery
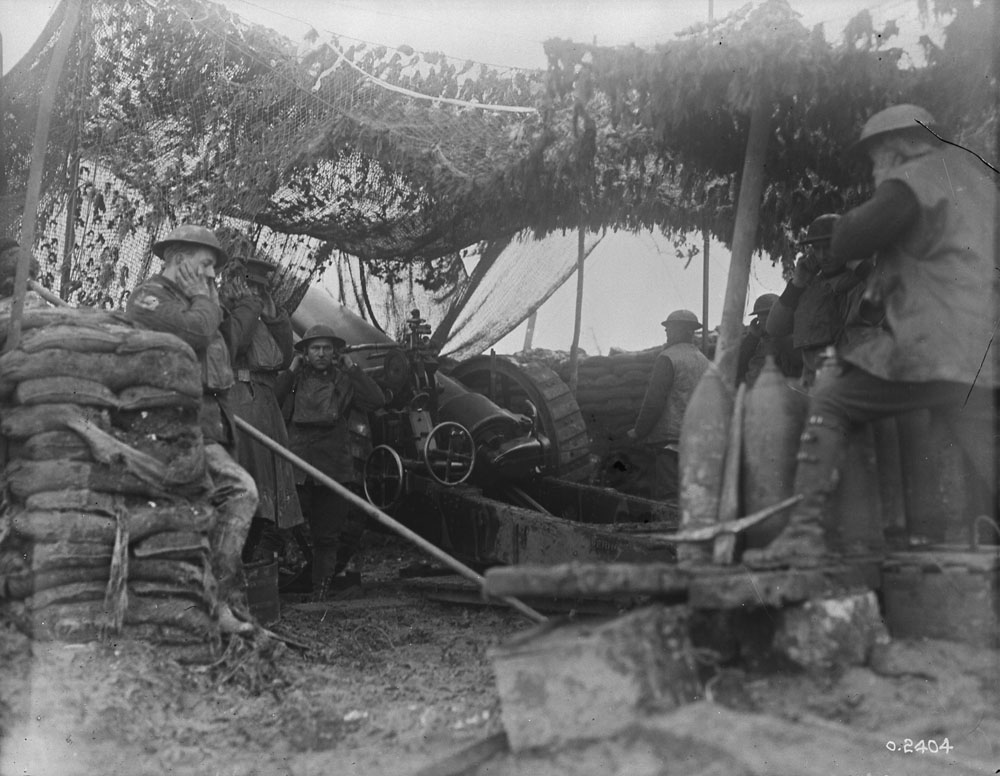
- Canadian Siege Artillery Gun: BL 8-inch howitzer Mk VIII firing into Lens, January 1918
- Active: 15 July 1916 – 1 November 1920
- Branch: Canadian Garrison Artillery
- Type: Corps Heavy Artillery
- Role: Siege Artillery
- Size: Battery
- Part of: Canadian Expeditionary Force

Commanders
- First Officer Commanding: Major A.G. Peake (Charlottetown, PEI)
- Second Officer Commanding: Major R.A. Ring (St. John, NB)

On 1 March 1916, instructions were issued from Militia Headquarters at Ottawa authorizing the organization of a "Depot" Battery, Siege Artillery, to be mobilized in Charlottetown, PEI. With an establishment of six officers, one warrant officer and 152 other ranks, quartering in the Connolly Building, on Queen Street, it was to recruit 'drafts' of reinforcement for PEI's No. 2 Overseas Battery Siege Artillery, which was then overseas. The unit was re-designated No. 5 Overseas Battery (Canadian) Siege Artillery, by authority of Militia HQ Ottawa, dated 12 April 1916, and on 15 July 1916, and it was placed on active service, now first commanded by Major A.G. Peake, who had returned from England.

It moved out of Charlottetown at full strength on 25 September 1916, embarked on board S.S. "SOUTHLAND" (SS Vaderland (1900)), and sailed from Halifax on 27 September. It arrived at Liverpool in England on 6 October 1916, and disembarked the next day, with a strength of 6 officers, 132 other ranks. On 15 October 1916, the War Office ordered a change of name to (No. 272) – 272nd (Canadian) Siege Battery, Royal Garrison Artillery when assigned to a Royal Artillery formation, as it continued in its training. On 29 January 1917, while at Lydd, in the renumbering of Canadian units, its final designation, No.8 Canadian Siege Battery, Canadian Garrison Artillery was authorized.

In England the Battery received its initial training at Witley Camp, and then followed a path through Ewshot Camp: Artillery School in Hampshire, in Aldershot at the RGA Siege Artillery School, at Lydd Training Camp: RGA Siege Artillery School and Ranges, and finally at Woolwich Common: RA Barracks. In February 1917, the unit was changed from a four to a six BL 8-inch howitzer Mk VI – VIII battery. Leaving from Woolwich Common, for Folkestone, on 31 March 1917, it crossed to Boulogne the following day. It first went into action near Festubert, in NE France, on 15 April with XI Corps (UK) Heavy Artillery, RGA, first seeing action during the Battle of Arras (1917) and subsequently engaged supporting designated BEF Corps' in the Second Battle of Flanders.

It remained with the BEF, in this sector and subsequently moved seeing action at Vielle Chapelle, then Fleurbaix and LePreol, and Armentieres, from June, until October 1917, suffering the noted loss of one gun on 20 August. The then designated 272nd Canadian Siege Battery, was in support of XI Corps (UK) from when it arrived in France until October 1917 and did not see action with the Canadian Corps at Vimy Ridge or Hill 70 but while with the BEF did see fifty counter-battery German bombardments. In one bombardment the Battery Commander, Major A.G. Peake was wounded on 16 June 1917, and Captain J.S. Bagnall assumed temporary command of the Battery. Captain R.A. Ring took over the Battery in July 1917, confirmed in the appointment on 25 August 1917, with the rank of Major.

Moving north into Flanders, having been designated to the Canadian Corps, it joined the 3rd Brigade Heavy Artillery, for the second stage and third stages of the Second Battle of Passchendaele, at Ypres, on 1 November 1917. On 18 January 1918, it moved into the Vimy-Lens front, and when the Canadian Corps moved back, for re-training, in May 1918, the battery remained in action under XVII (UK) Corps Heavy Artillery.

After a short period of rest at the end of June, it rejoined the Canadian Corps, taking over gun positions east of Arras, on 16 July 1918. It moved to the Amiens front, with the 3rd Canadian Division, coming engaged in the Battle of Amiens (1918), commencing on 8 August 1918, operating now with an establishment of 8 officers and 215 other ranks. It moved forward during the Hundred Days Offensive, taking up successive positions at Rosieres and Cagnicourt (Arras Front), supporting the Battle of Canal du Nord, and continued north for engagements during the Capture of Cambria, into October 1918. No.8 Canadian (Overseas) Siege Battery, 3rd Brigade Canadian Garrison Artillery and was at Hérin near Valenciennes, France, on 11 November when the Armistice was declared. The march from west of Mons into Germany took twenty-five days, leading Canadians crossed into Germany on 4 December, BEF and CEF command deciding the Rhine would be crossed on 13 December.

The Canadian Garrison Corps Heavy Artillery was assigned the task of supporting two CEF Divisions into Germany, and the 8th Siege Battery crossed into Germany for the initial stages of the Occupation of the Rhineland, on 9 December, taking up a position on the left bank of the Rhine near the Hohenzollern Bridge, at Cologne. It was moved several times in Germany until the end of January 1919, beginning its trip home from Mehlen in Hesse. The Battery returned to England on 28 January 1919, and was based at the CEF run Witley Camp, in Surrey, where it was deactivated on 2 April 1919.

It returned to Canada on board the "RMS Mauretania (1906)" sailing from Southampton on 3 May, arriving at Halifax, NS, on the 9th. It was demobilized at Charlottetown, PEI (and Halifax), with Major R.A. Ring continuing in command until demobilization. In a paper exercise, as for all CEF active service units, it was disbanded on 1 November 1920. No. 8 Canadian (Overseas) Siege Artillery Battery, CEF is perpetuated by The Prince Edward Island Regiment (RCAC).

The Officer Commanding: Major A.G. Peake

Arthur George Peake was born in Charlottetown on 25 August 1871, and after his schooling he worked in the family owned Peake Brothers and Company, until going overseas during World War 1. With twenty-six years of Charlottetown militia service, in the Canadian Garrison Artillery, at the age of 44, he volunteered for service with the newly stood-up No. 2 Heavy Battery Depot. Mobilizing in Charlottetown, later designated as No.2 Siege Battery, he was its first Officer Commanding, taking it to England.

Seeing the unit through all its training, in May 1916, just prior to crossing to France, he was required to give up command. Returning to Charlottetown, following-up the second Charlottetown organized "Depot" Battery, it being re-designated No. 5 Overseas Battery (Canadian) Siege Artillery, he was appointed its first Officer Commanding.

Again, leading his battery through training in England, on 1 April 1917, crossing to Boulogne, he first saw action in France, on 15 April. Engaged by German counter-battery fire, at Armentieres, on 16 June 1917, he was wounded, the first casualty in the Battery. After three months on active service, he gave up command, his wound requiring him to be evacuated.

Returning to Charlottetown, and when discharged, he engaged successfully in farming and fox ranching, until forced to retire through illness. Stricken with paralysis in 1938, he was confined to bed, for five years, following a stroke. In failing health, he died at age 71, on 11 August 1943.

== 11th Canadian Field Artillery (Howitzer) Brigade Ammunition Column, CEF ==
From the start of the War, as they were established, CEF Divisions had assigned a 'Divisional Artillery' of three Field Artillery Brigades and one (Field) Howitzer Brigade, each Brigade having four batteries and a 'Brigade Ammunition Column'. Mobilized for the CEF 3rd Canadian Divisional Artillery, 11th Field Artillery (Howitzer) Brigade, with its Headquarters Battery (Guelph, ON), its 29th (Guelph, ON), 35th (Montreal, QC), 36th (Sydney, NS), and 43rd (Guelph, ON) Batteries, sailed to Plymouth, from Saint John, New Brunswick, on 26 February 1916.

For assignment to 11th Field Artillery (Howitzer) Brigade, the 11th (Howitzer) Brigade Ammunition Column, as its organic unit, was organized, in December 1915. Under the command of Captain Daniel Albert MacKinnon (of Highfield, PEI), being mobilized in Halifax, NS, it drew 250 more applicants above its authorized establishment, with over 70 Islanders being accepted. Mainly recruited from PEI, through January and February 1916, after rapid training as howitzer gunners and artillerymen, having been quartered a South Barracks in Halifax, it was manned to an established strength of 3 officers and 107 other ranks. Despite being listed in the published Nominal Roll as having sailed from Halifax on the "S.S. MISSANABIE (1914)" on 26 February 1916, the Official 11th Brigade War Diary entry on this date states that its Ammunition Column did not arrive to board this ship as its soldiers were being quarantined for measles. The 11th Brigade Ammunition Column sailed two weeks later on the S.S. METAGAMA (1914, sister ship to the MISSANABIE, both owned by Canadian Pacific Ocean Services Limited) on 17 March, arriving in England on 25 March.

11th Canadian Field Artillery (Howitzer) Brigade Ammunition Column
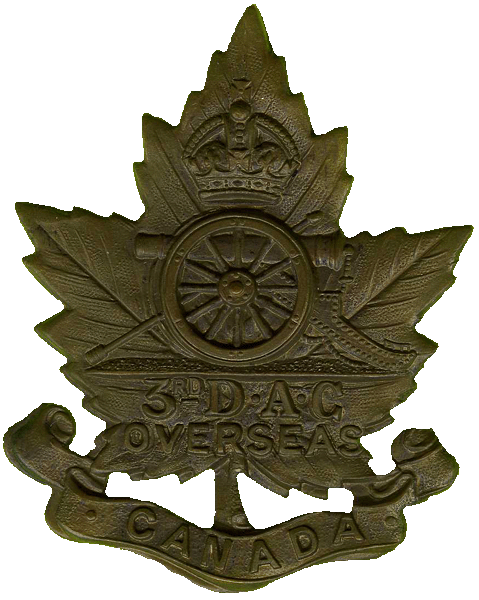
- 3rd Divisional Artillery Column
- Active: 15 July 1916 – 1 November 1920
- Branch: Divisional Artillery
- Type: Howitzer Brigade
- Role: Artillery Ammunition Column
- Size: Half Battery / Section
- Part of: Canadian Expeditionary Force
- Garrison/HQ: Charlottetown, PEI

Commanders
- 11th BAC Officer Commanding: Captain D.A. MacKinnon (Highfield, PEI)
- 3rd DAC Officer Commanding: Lt-Col W.G. Hurdman (Ottawa, Ont)

After its delayed arrival at Plymouth on 25 March, the 11th BAC establishment was to include dedicated General Service (GS) ammunition wagons (with limber), one wagon per howitzer, and one GS wagon for stores, with at least 132 horses (both riding and draft, using six per wagon). The Column's 'operational' task was to have available (carry) a constant supply, and bring forward (on-call), forty-eight rounds per howitzer, to a Firing Battery's entrenched position, or to supply it to the Battery's own ammunition wagon lines. Working mostly at night, moving forward, the BAC ammunition wagons were interchangeable with a Firing Batteries own ammunition wagons (one per gun), so full wagons could be easily 'dropped-off', being unhooked and taken away for reloading, a howitzer battery looking to 'always have' available 108 rounds.

The BAC picked up its 'own' resupply at a Refilling Point, as set up by their supporting Division Ammunition Column (DAC), the DAC holding an additional 44 rounds per howitzer. The BAC was divided into two sections, commanded by Lieutenants, each to supply two batteries, of the supported Brigade, and included a Battery Sergeant-Major, a Battery Quartermaster Sergeant, a Farrier-Sergeant, Shoeing Smiths (of which 1 would be a Corporal), 2 Saddlers (maintaining driver equipment), 2 Wheel-Wrights, a Trumpeter, 4 Sergeants, 5 Corporals, 5 Bombardiers, 3 Gunners acting as Batmen, Signallers, Drivers, and Gunners.

As mobilized a Divisional Ammunition Column was organized around three 'Field Artillery' Sections, and a fourth 'Howitzer' Section, they bringing forward scaled levels of field artillery, howitzer, and small arms ammunition, for the Brigade Columns. Originally organized in December 1915, the 3rd Canadian Divisional Artillery Column arrived in England in March 1916, with only its three 'Field Artillery' Sections, they having been recruited in Kingston, Toronto and Winnipeg. As established for four Sections, it was to soon gain its 'Howitzer' Section, this shortly after their arrival in England.

On 13 May 1916, originating from BEF GHQ, orders were issued for the reorganization of Royal and Imperial Divisional Artillery establishments, for reasons of operational effectiveness, to be restructured having four generic 'mixed' Artillery Brigades, to a standardized: universal establishment, each Divisional Artillery Brigade was to be allocated three Field Artillery Batteries and one Howitzer Battery. The new organized Divisional Brigades neatly matched the emerging tactic of the creeping barrage, for one 18-pounder Field Battery would be superimposed over the other two firing batteries (waiting for targets of opportunity), while the 4.5-inch Howitzer Battery spread its fire ahead of the rest. This 'operational decision' additionally saw the abolition of the four integral 'Brigade Ammunition Columns' and their being broken up or absorbed into their supporting 'Divisional Ammunition Column'. Consequently, while still in England, on 25 May 1916, the 11th (Howitzer) Brigade Ammunition Column was 'officially' absorbed into the 3rd Canadian Divisional Ammunition Column (DAC).

The future of the Islands' 11th BAC was earlier foretold, as their OC Captain (later Major, DSO) MacKinnon, after arrival in England, was almost immediately transferred to the 3rd Divisional Artillery 9th Brigade CFA, and on promotion he assumed command of 36th (Sydney) Howitzer Battery. Standing in England, leaving for France, having reorganized, the 11th BAC personnel were placed on active service on 15 July 1916, as a CEF unit. Having to absorb three Field BACs and a Howitzer BAC, the 3rd DAC would take on additional authorized ammunition wagons, horses and personnel, needing howitzer battery support capability, and excess to establishment personnel would be moved as artilleryman to any of the sixteen gun batteries, of the Division. This 'internal' reassignment of BAC artilleryman was consistent with past practices, as since 1906, it was an established routine to consider 'ammunition column' personnel, as a manning reserve and a source of timely replacements for 'casualties' in their brigade's batteries.

In the 'new' Divisional Artillery 'universal establishment Artillery Brigade' structure, the Divisional Ammunition Columns were also reorganized, adapting to a new supporting model, devised around a dedicated 'A' Echelon, and a supporting 'B' Echelon. The 'A' Echelon was to comprise four 'new' Sections, one for each of the Division's four 'mixed' Artillery Brigades. Each 'A' Section, with the same task of bringing forward 'first-line' artillery ammunition to the batteries of an affiliated Artillery Brigade, as previously did a BAC.

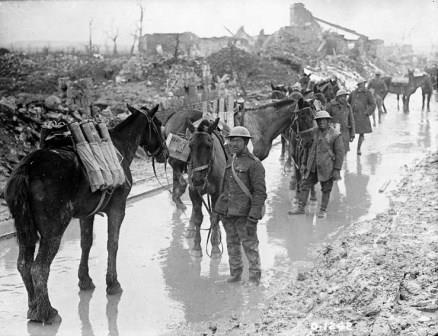
Ammunition Column Pack horses transporting ammunition, Vimy Ridge, April 1917

Now reorganized, under command of Lt-Col W.G. Hurdman, the 3rd DAC landed in Le Havre, France, on 15 July 1916, seeing the four 'A' Sections serving continuously, in France and Flanders, up to the Armistice, and until 12/13 February 1919 at Renaix, in East Flanders. Billeted in Barlin, France, during the Canadian Corps April 1917 action at Vimy Ridge, it calmly documents "Sections busy hauling ammunition and Engineer material (day and night) to Gun positions". Reorganized once while in France, it ended the War with three 'A' Sections, as its 'old' No. 3 (Winnipeg) Section's personnel, wagons and horses had been transferred to the newly arrived 4th Cdn Divisional Artillery, on 25 June 1917.

For two and a half years, after five months training in Halifax and England, the Islanders in 3rd DAC, went about their primary task: hauling, packing or supplying to their guns, and in stables or on watering parade. With their horses and mules, they 'hauled' ammunition to their firing batteries, or they 'hauled' material for their Canadian Engineers. When the roads were impassable, they 'packed' ammunition forward on their mules; or when available to assist, with their wagons, to the rear, they 'supplied' ammunition to flanking or supporting divisions. When not drawing or supplying ammunition to affiliated battery wagon lines, the Islanders had to go forward and 'collect' empty cartridge cases, or 'salvage' ammunition left at vacated battery positions and on occasion found at abandoned enemy artillery positions. Of the 100 Islanders who saw active service with the 3rd DAC, or as transferred to a 3rd Divisional Artillery Battery, 10 were killed and 30 were wounded.

Just after the armistice, in December 1918, the 3rd DAC reported an effective and attached strength of 22 officers and 626 other ranks. It returned to England on 19 February 1919, barracked first at Witley Camp, until broken up at Bramshott Camp, near Aldershot, in Hampshire, in March 1919. A first detachment of 3 officers and 122 other ranks returned to Canada on the "SS Olympic (1911)" out of Southampton on 18 March. A second detachment of 8 officers and 379 other ranks departed on the "RMS Cedric" sailing from Liverpool on 19 March. Subsequent to demobilization in Canada in March 1919, the 11th Field Artillery (Howitzer) Brigade Ammunition Column was disbanded on 1 November 1920.

The Officer Commanding: Captain D.A. MacKinnon (later Major, DSO)

Daniel Albert MacKinnon was born 12 November 1876, in Highfield, PEI. Orphaned early in life, taking up harness racing at 14, a lifelong devotion, at 21 he was PEI's first registered pharmacist. In 1901, he joined the Island militia as a Gunner, and by 1905, promoted to Captain, a very successful and accomplished officer, he was appointed to No. 2 (Charlottetown) Battery, Canadian Garrison Artillery. Before called to active service, with the 11th Brigade Ammunition Column in 1915, he commanded, a strong Island detachment manning, the (Fort) Ives Point Battery, it equipped with two 6-inch BL and two 12-pounder QF guns, on McNabs Island, it part of the Halifax (Harbour) Coastal Artillery Defences.

After commanding its standup, organization, training and arrival in England, he left the 11th Brigade Ammunition Column, in May 1916. On promotion, assigned to command 36th (NS) Howitzer Battery, he was awarded the Distinguished Service Order for service at the Somme. Being additionally 'Mentioned in Despatches' for his actions on Vimy Ridge in April 1917, for his batteries action on 28 March 1918, he earned the Croix de Guerre, when engaged with 10th Brigade, CFA, again on Vimy Ridge, in the French action in the defence of Arras. He was with his battery at Jemappes, in southwestern Belgium, outside Mons, at the Armistice.

Returning to Canada, on demobilization, he remained active with the Charlottetown militia and the PEI Heavy Brigade, Canadian Garrison Artillery. His interests and business activities taking more of his attention, reengaged with his stable in harness racing, the MacKinnon Drug Company, taking to fox farming and breeding, and in 1921, already a columnist, purchasing the 'Charlottetown' Guardian Publishing Company, he transferred to the militia reserve list, in 1923. Purchasing the Charlottetown Driving Park, in 1930, in 1932, he retired from the Island militia.

In 1962, at the age of 85, concluding a passion with horses, acknowledged as the father of harness racing in Eastern Canada, he disposed of his last stock. Two years later, on 22 December 1964, at the age of 87, he died, in Charlottetown, after a short illness.
