= Prince Edward Island Regiment =

The Prince Edward Island Regiment
- Regimental badge
- Active: 1946–present
- Country: Canada
- Branch: Canadian Army
- Type: Cavalry
- Role: Armoured reconnaissance
- Size: One regiment (140 soldiers)
- Part of: 36 Canadian Brigade Group
- Garrison/HQ: J. David Stewart Armoury, Charlottetown
- Motto: Parva sub ingenti (Latin for 'The small under the protection of the great')
- Colors: Gold and black
- March: "Old Solomon Levi"
- Engagements: Second Boer War; First World War; Second World War; War in Afghanistan
- Battle honours: See #Battle honours
- Website: army-armee.forces.gc.ca/en/5-canadian-division/the-prince-edward-island-regiment/index.page

Commanders
- Current commander: LCol Christopher Michaud
- Colonel-in-chief: Prince Edward, Duke of Edinburgh

Insignia
- Abbreviation: PEIR
- NATO Map Symbol

The Prince Edward Island Regiment (RCAC) is a Primary Reserve armoured reconnaissance regiment of the Canadian Forces, 5th Canadian Division, 36 Canadian Brigade Group. The regiment is based in Charlottetown and Summerside, Prince Edward Island.

== Organization ==
The Prince Edward Island Regiment is organized into the following components:

- Regimental Headquarters
- Recce Squadron
- Headquarters Squadron
- Band

== Lineage ==
=== The Prince Edward Island Regiment (RCAC) ===
- Originated on 25 June 1875, in Charlottetown, Prince Edward Island, as the Queen's County Provisional Battalion of Infantry.
- Amalgamated on 30 June 1876, with the Charlottetown Provisional Battalion of Infantry and redesignated as the Queen's County Battalion of Infantry.
- Redesignated on 4 October 1878, as the 82nd Queen's County Battalion of Infantry.
- Redesignated on 8 May 1900, as the 82nd Queen's County Regiment.
- Redesignated on 5 June 1906, as the 82nd Abegweit Light Infantry.
- Redesignated on 29 March 1920, as The Prince Edward Island Regiment.
- Redesignated on 15 June 1927, as The Prince Edward Island Highlanders.
- Redesignated on 1 January 1941, as the 2nd (Reserve) Battalion, The Prince Edward Island Highlanders.
- Redesignated on 1 June 1945, as The Prince Edward Island Highlanders.
- Converted to armour and amalgamated on 1 April 1946, with the 17th (Reserve) Armoured Regiment (Prince Edward Island Light Horse), RCAC and redesignated as the 17th (Prince Edward Island) Reconnaissance Regiment
- Redesignated on 4 February 1949, as The Prince Edward Island Regiment (17th Reconnaissance Regiment).
- Amalgamated 28 February 1955, with the 28th Light Anti-Aircraft Regiment, RCA.
- Redesignated on 19 May 1958, as The Prince Edward Island Regiment (RCAC).

=== The Charlottetown Provisional Battalion of Infantry ===
- Originated on 2 July 1875, in Charlottetown, Prince Edward Island, as the Charlottetown Provisional Battalion of Infantry.
- Amalgamated on 30 June 1876, with the Queen's County Provisional Battalion of Infantry and redesignated as the Queen's County Battalion of Infantry.

=== The Prince Edward Island Light Horse ===
- Originated on 1 June 1901, in Charlottetown, Prince Edward Island, as “L” Squadron, Prince Edward Island Mounted Rifles.
- Redesignated on 1 October 1901, as “L” Squadron, Canadian Mounted Rifles.
- Redesignated on 1 April 1903, as the Prince Edward Island Light Horse
- Granted full regimental status on 16 February 1914, with the formation of an additional squadron in Summerside, PEI.
- Redesignated on 1 April 1914, as the 36th Prince Edward Island Light Horse.
- Redesignated on 15 March 1920, as The Prince Edward Island Light Horse.
- Redesignated on 1 April 1941, as the 17th (Reserve) Armoured Regiment (Prince Edward Island Light Horse).
- Amalgamated on 1 April 1946, with The Prince Edward Island Highlanders to form the 17th (Prince Edward Island) Reconnaissance Regiment.

=== 28th Light Anti-Aircraft Regiment, RCA ===
- Originated on 31 March 1882, in Charlottetown, Prince Edward Island, as the Prince Edward Island Provisional Brigade of Garrison Artillery.
- Redesignated on 1 January 1893, as the Prince Edward Island Battalion of Garrison Artillery.
- Redesignated on 1 January 1895, as the 4th Prince Edward Island Battalion.
- Redesignated on 28 December 1895, as the 4th Prince Edward Island Regiment of Garrison Artillery.
- Amalgamated on 1 January 1904, with the Charlottetown Field Company.
- Redesignated on 1 April 1908, as the 4th Prince Edward Island Regiment (Heavy Brigade).
- Redesignated on 2 May 1910, as the 4th Prince Edward Island Heavy Brigade, CGA.
- Redesignated on 1 June 1912, as the Prince Edward Island Heavy Brigade, CGA.
- Redesignated on 2 February 1920, as the 1st (Prince Edward Island) Heavy Brigade.
- Redesignated on 15 March 1920, as the 1st (Prince Edward Island) Heavy Brigade, CA.
- Redesignated on 1 July 1925, as the 1st (Prince Edward Island) Medium Brigade, CA.
- Redesignated on 3 June 1935, as the 1st (Prince Edward Island) Medium Brigade, RCA.
- Redesignated on 1 April 1946, as the 28th Light Anti-Aircraft Regiment, RCA.
- Amalgamated on 28 February 1955, with The Prince Edward Island Regiment (17th Reconnaissance Regiment).

=== The Charlottetown Field Company ===
- Originated on 16 August 1878, in Charlottetown, Prince Edward Island, as the Charlottetown Engineer Company.
- Redesignated on 1 August 1899, as the Charlottetown Field Company.
- Amalgamated on 1 January 1904, with the 4th Prince Edward Island Regiment of Garrison Artillery.

=== Lineage chart ===
Lineage chart

1875 | Queen's County Provisional Bn of Infy | Charlottetown Provisional Bn of Infy
1876 | Queen's County Bn of Infy
1878 | 82nd Queen's County Bn of Infy | Charlottetown Engineer Coy
1882
1893
1895
1895
1899 | Charlottetown Fd Coy
1900 | 82nd Queen's County Regt
1901 | "L" Sqn, PEI Mounted Rifles
1901 | "L" Sqn, CMR
1903 | PEI Light Horse (Note: Squadron)
1904
1906 | 82nd "Abegweit Light Infy" Regt
1908
1910
1912
1914 | PEI Light Horse (Note: Regiment)
1914 | 36th PEI Light Horse
1915 | No. 2 Heavy Bty Depot, CEF
1915 | 105th "Overseas" Bn, CEF | 2nd "Overseas" Bty Canadian Siege Arty, CEF
1916 | Canadian Bde Siege Arty, CEF | 98th (Canadian) Siege Bty, CEF | No. 5 "Overseas" Bty Siege Arty, CEF
104th "Overseas" Bn, CEF
1916 | 1st Canadian Heavy Arty Group, CEF | 272nd (Canadian) Siege Bty, CEF
1917 | 104th "Overseas" Bn, CEF | No. 2 Canadian Siege Bty, CEF | No. 8 Canadian Siege Bty, CEF
1918 | 1st Bde, CGA, CEF
1920 | Disbanded | Disbanded | Disbanded
1920 | 1st Bn (105th Bn, CEF), The PEI Regt | 1st Regt, The PEI Light Horse
1925
1927 | 1st Bn (105th Bn, CEF), The PEI Highlanders
1935
1936 | The PEI Highlanders | The PEI Light Horse
1941 | 1st Bn, The PEI Highlanders, CASF | 2nd (Reserve) Bn, The PEI Highlanders | 1st Canadian Armd Bde HQ Sqn (The PEI Light Horse), CASF | 2nd (Reserve) Regt, The PEI Light Horse
1941 | 17th (Reserve) Armd Regt (PEI Light Horse)
1943 | 2nd Corps Defence Coy (The PEI Light Horse), CIC, CASF
1945 | Disbanded | The PEI Highlanders
1946 | Disbanded
1946 | 17th (PEI) Recce Regt
1949 | The PEI Regt (17th Recce Regt)
1955 | The PEI Regt (17th Recce Regt)
1958 | The PEI Regt (RCAC)

Independent arty btys
PEI Provisional Bde of Garrison Arty
PEI Bn of Garrison Arty
4th "PEI" Bn
4th PEI Regt of Garrison Arty
4th PEI Regt of Garrison Arty
4th PEI Regt (Heavy Bde)
4th "PEI" Heavy Bde, CGA
"PEI" Heavy Bde, CGA
1st (PEI) Heavy Bde
1st (PEI) Heavy Bde, CA
1st (PEI) Medium Bde, CA
1st (PEI) Medium Bde, RCA
28th Light Anti-Aircraft Regt, RCA

== Perpetuations ==
The PEIR perpetuates the following units of the Canadian Expeditionary Force:

- 1st Brigade, Canadian Garrison Artillery, CEF
- No. 2 Canadian Siege Battery, CEF
- No. 8 Canadian Siege Battery, CEF
- 105th Battalion (Prince Edward Island Highlanders), CEF

== History ==
In 1946 the amalgamation of The Prince Edward Island Light Horse and The Prince Edward Island Highlanders created The Prince Edward Island Regiment, 17th Reconnaissance Regiment.

The Prince Edward Island Regiment was amalgamated with the 28th Light Anti-Aircraft Regiment in 1955.

=== Robert Cyril Claude Brooks ===
The youngest Canadian soldier to die in the Second World War, 14-year-old Robert Cyril Claude Brooks was a member of the 17th (Reserve) Armoured Regiment (Prince Edward Island Light Horse). He was killed in a training accident near Coleman, Prince Edward Island, at approximately 7:30 p.m. on 23 September 1944, when a Universal Carrier was driven through a guard rail on a bridge, overturning into the water below. He was trapped beneath the overturned vehicle and drowned, along with two fellow members of the regiment, Sergeant D.C. Ramsay and Trooper W.N. Dennis.

== Alliances ==
- United Kingdom – 9th/12th Royal Lancers (Prince of Wales's)
- United Kingdom – The Black Watch

== Battle honours ==
Battle honours in small capitals are for large operations and campaigns and those in lowercase are for more specific battles. Bold type indicates honours emblazoned on the regimental guidon. The Second World War Battle Honour is for the service of the Prince Edward Island Light Horse which was, on 27 February 1941, Headquarters Squadron, 1st Canadian Armoured Brigade and on 1 November 1943 became the 2nd Corps Defence Company.

South African War
South Africa, 1900
First World War
- **Arras,** 1917, **'18**
- Ypres, 1917
- **Amiens**
- Hindenburg Line
- **Pursuit to Mons**
Second World War
North-West Europe, 1944–1945
Honorary distinction: The wartime badge of the North Nova Scotia Highlanders with the year dates "1944–45" in recognition of the role played by the Prince Edward Island Highlanders in the mobilization of the Canadian Active Service Force unit of the North Nova Scotia Highlanders.
South-West Asia
Afghanistan

== Equipment ==
| Model | Type | Dates | Builder | Details |
|---|---|---|---|---|
| Volkswagen/Bombardier Iltis | light utility vehicle | 1985–2004 | Volkswagen, Germany | optional M101 trailer unit; replaced by G-Wagen |
| LUVW C&R (G-Wagen) 4 × 4 | light utility vehicle | 2004- | Mercedes-Benz, Germany | replaced the Iltis light trucks in Afghanistan |
| LUVW MILCOTS (Milverado) - 2003 Silverado Basic model 861 (GM K25943HD) | light utility vehicle | 2003- | Chevrolet, USA | replacing the Iltis jeeps in North American operations only |
| C9 | light machine gun |
| Colt Canada C7 rifle | personal weapon | 1984- | Diemaco/Colt Canada |
| C6 | GPMG |

== The Prince Edward Island Regiment (RCAC) Museum ==
Prince Edward Island Regiment (RCAC) Museum
- Location: J. David Stewart Armoury, 3 Haviland Street, Charlottetown, PE C1A 7N1
- Type: Regimental Museum

The Prince Edward Island Regiment (RCAC) Museum collects, preserves, displays and studies the military history of the founding units of The Prince Edward Island Regiment, from the island's formation (founding). The main concentration is on the period 1870 until the present. The RCAC museum is at the J. David Stewart Armoury in Charlottetown, Prince Edward Island.

== Order of precedence ==
| Preceded by 1st Hussars | The Prince Edward Island Regiment (RCAC) | Succeeded by The Royal Canadian Hussars (Montreal) |
