= Colchester and Hants Regiment =

The Colchester and Hants Regiment
- Active: 1910–1936
- Country: Canada
- Branch: Canadian Militia
- Type: Line infantry
- Role: Infantry
- Size: One regiment
- Part of: Non-Permanent Active Militia
- Garrison/HQ: Truro, Nova Scotia
- Engagements: First World War
- Battle honours: Mount Sorrel; Somme, 1916, '18; Flers–Courcelette; Thiepval; Ancre Heights; Arras, 1917, '18; Vimy, 1917; Arleux; Scarpe, 1917, '18; Hill 70; Ypres, 1917; Passchendaele; Amiens; Hindenburg Line; Canal du Nord; Cambrai, 1918; Pursuit to Mons; France and Flanders, 1915–18

The Colchester and Hants Regiment was an infantry regiment of the Non-Permanent Active Militia of the Canadian Militia (now the Canadian Army). In 1936, it was amalgamated with The Cumberland Highlanders to create The North Nova Scotia Highlanders.

== Lineage ==
=== The Colchester and Hants Regiment ===
- Originated on 1 April 1910, in Truro, Nova Scotia, as the 70th Colchester and Hants Regiment .
- Redesignated on 2 May 1910, as the 76th Colchester and Hants Rifles.
- Amalgamated on 1 April 1920, with the 81st Hants Regiment and redesignated as The Colchester and Hants Regiment.
- Amalgamated on 1 December 1936, with The Cumberland Highlanders and “C” Company of the 6th Machine Gun Battalion, CMGC, to form The North Nova Scotia Highlanders (Machine Gun).

=== 81st Hants Regiment ===
- Originated on 16 February 1914, in Windsor, Nova Scotia, as a regiment of infantry in Hants County.
- Redesignated on 1 May 1914, as the 68th Regiment.
- Redesignated again on 1 June 1914, as the 81st Hants Regiment.
- Amalgamated on 15 May 1920, with the 76th Colchester and Hants Rifles and Redesignated as The Colchester and Hants Regiment.

== Perpetuations ==
- 25th Battalion (Nova Scotia Rifles), CEF
- 106th Battalion (Nova Scotia Rifles), CEF

== History ==
=== First World War ===
On 6 August 1914, detachments of the 76th Colchester and Hants Rifles were placed on active service for local protection duties.

On 7 November 1914, the 25th Battalion (Nova Scotia Rifles), CEF, was authorized and on 20 May 1915, the battalion embarked for Great Britain. On 16 September 1916, the 25th Battalion disembarked in France where it fought as part of the 5th Canadian Infantry Brigade, 2nd Canadian Division, in France and Flanders until the end of the war. On 15 September 1920, the 25th Battalion was disbanded upon its return to Canada.

On 22 December 1915, the 106th Battalion (Nova Scotia Rifles), CEF, was authorized and on 15 July 1916, the battalion embarked for Great Britain. After its arrival in the UK, the 25th Battalion provided reinforcements for the Canadian Corps in the field. On 5 October 1916, its personnel were absorbed by the 40th Battalion (Nova Scotia), CEF. Finally on 8 December 1917, the 106th Battalion was disbanded.

=== 1920s–1930s ===
On 1 April 1920, as a result of the Otter Commission, the 76th Colchester and Hants Rifles were amalgamated with the 81st Hants Regiment and became The Colchester and Hants Regiment.

On 1 December 1936, as a result of the 1936 Canadian Militia reorganization, The Colchester and Hants Regiment were amalgamated with The Cumberland Highlanders and “C” Company of the 6th Machine Gun Battalion, CMGC, to form The North Nova Scotia Highlanders (Machine Gun).

== Alliances ==
- United Kingdom - The South Staffordshire Regiment (Until 1936)

== Battle honours ==
=== Great War ===
- Mount Sorrel (Note: Selected to be borne on colours and appointments)
- Somme, 1916, '18
- Flers–Courcelette
- Thiepval
- Ancre Heights
- Arras, 1917, '18
- Vimy, 1917
- Arleux
- Scarpe, 1917, '18
- Hill 70
- Ypres, 1917
- Passchendaele
- Amiens
- Hindenburg Line
- Canal du Nord
- Cambrai, 1918
- Pursuit to Mons
- France and Flanders, 1915–18
