= 36 Canadian Brigade Group =

Brigade of the Canadian Army

- Active: 1992–present
- Country: Canada
- Branch: Canadian Army
- Type: Headquarters
- Part of: 2nd Canadian Division
- Garrison/HQ: Halifax, Nova Scotia
- Motto: Atlanticus fortis (Latin for 'Atlantic strength')

Commanders
- Current commander: Colonel L.S. Gallant
- Regimental sergeant-major: Chief Warrant Officer E.P. Smith

Insignia
NATO Map Symbol
36 CBG
2 Cdn Div
- Abbreviation: 36 CBG

36 Canadian Brigade Group (French: 36^{e} Groupe-brigade du Canada) is a reserve component brigade of the Canadian Army, which Commands reserve units in 2nd Canadian Division for Nova Scotia and Prince Edward Island. It was created in 1992 by merging the Nova Scotia Militia District and the Prince Edward Island Militia District.

== Brigade units ==
36 Canadian Brigade Group		Halifax, Nova Scotia
36 Canadian Brigade Group Headquarters		Halifax, Nova Scotia
The Halifax Rifles (RCAC)	Armoured	Halifax, Nova Scotia
The Prince Edward Island Regiment (RCAC)	Reconnaissance	Charlottetown, Prince Edward Island
1st (Halifax-Dartmouth) Field Artillery Regiment, RCA	Artillery	Halifax, Nova Scotia
84th Independent Field Battery, RCA	Artillery	Yarmouth, Nova Scotia
36 Combat Engineer Regiment	Combat Engineer	Halifax and Sydney, Nova Scotia
36 Signal Regiment	Signals	Halifax and Glace Bay, Nova Scotia, and Charlottetown, Prince Edward Island
The Princess Louise Fusiliers	Light infantry	Halifax, Nova Scotia
The West Nova Scotia Regiment	Light infantry	Aldershot, Middleton, Windsor, and Bridgewater, Nova Scotia
The Nova Scotia Highlanders	Light infantry	Truro, Springhill and Pictou, Nova Scotia
Cape Breton Highlanders	Light infantry	Sydney, Nova Scotia
36 Service Battalion	Logistics	Halifax, Sydney and Aldershot, Nova Scotia
36 Canadian Brigade Group Band	Music	Halifax, Nova Scotia

Cities with 36 CBG units
