= 105th Battalion (Prince Edward Island Highlanders), CEF =

105th Battalion (Prince Edward Island Highlanders)
- Active: 22 December 1915 to 12 October 1917
- Country: Canada
- Branch: 5th Canadian Division
- Type: 15th Brigade (Designated)
- Role: Infantry
- Size: Battalion (Highlander)
- Part of: Canadian Expeditionary Force
- Garrison/HQ: Charlottetown, Prince Edward Island

Commanders
- First officer commanding: Lt-Col A. Ernest Ings (Charlottetown, PEI)
- Regimental sergeant major: Sgt-Major Joseph J. Trainor (Charlottetown, PEI)

105th Battalion (Prince Edward Island Highlanders), CEF was a battalion of the First World War Canadian Expeditionary Force. It was recruited, through the 82nd Regiment Abegweit Light Infantry, first as a reinforcement company, and then a CEF battalion, from its headquarters in Charlottetown, Prince Edward Island. As initially, on 3 September 1915, the 82nd was only authorized to prepare an overseas reinforcement draft: The Infantry Reinforcement Company, Prince Edward Island, "to reinforce as soon as ready the battalions from the Maritime Provinces."

== Formation: A Prince Edward Island battalion ==
In response to a very successful recruiting drive, it was requested, by the PEI Patriotic Society, to raise a battalion and authority was sought, with the 'Infantry Reinforcement Company' to be retained as its nucleus. "Understanding that the battalion should remain intact and be representation of the province throughout the war", mobilization of the battalion was authorized on 22 December 1915, and by 15 March 1916, recruiting was completed.

Of the 1,548 recruits who offered service, 260 were rejected. This left 1,153 all ranks, in companies who were trained and quartered in Charlottetown (Lt-Col Allan – 561), Summerside (Major T.H. Inman – 493), Georgetown (Capt U.L. Dawson – 115), and Souris (Capt W.E.F. Hardy – 115).

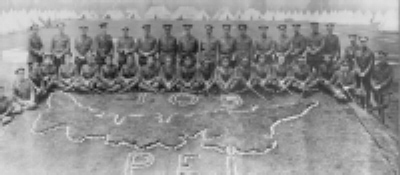
The 105th Battalion CEF, Camp Valcartier 1916

On 20 April 1916, the battalion received its CEF designation as the 105th Canadian Infantry Battalion (Prince Edward Island Highlanders) and on 13 June 1916, it moved to Camp Valcartier, Quebec. Finally on 13 July 1916, it was en route to England, sailing from Halifax embarked on the SS Empress of Britain on 15 July 1916.

Arriving at Liverpool on 25 July 1916, it proceeded to Shorncliffe Army Camp in Kent, where it was attached to the 1st Canadian Training Division. The strength of the 105th Battalion leaving Canada was 37 officers and 1,107 other ranks, under the command of Lieutenant Colonel A. Ernest Ings, with Lt-Col R.H. Campbell as Second-in-Command.

== Amalgamation and disbandment ==
While recruited for assignment to the newly forming 5th Canadian Division, once in England, the battalion was not destined to see active service and was quickly designated as a reinforcing unit. Shuffled around England, while undergoing training, the 105th Battalion eventually sent out three reinforcement drafts to France, for earlier recruited and manpower short active battalions. In the fall of 1916, large drafts of Islanders made their way to active service in France: 140 other ranks to the 13th Battalion (RHC), 1st Cdn Division, on 28 November 1916; 60 other ranks to the 25th Battalion (NSR), 2nd Cdn Division, on 28 November 1916; and then 120 other ranks to the 14th Battalion (RMR), 1st Cdn Division, on 5 December 1916.

Having no political champion in Ottawa, with no support from HQ Militia District No.6 in Halifax, and thus no chance of active service, on 24 January 1917, the much reduced 105th Bn was amalgamated with the 104th Battalion, CEF. It having earlier come to England, from New Brunswick, and after a change of command, the CO of the 105th, Lt-Col Ings assumed command. The new 104th (NB) Battalion, was quickly absorbed into the 13th Canadian Reserve Battalion, CEF, it only having been organized on 20 January 1917 (as authorized in OMFC Canadian Routine Order 271 of 20 January 1917). When reinforced and again designated for service in France, the 104th (NB) Battalion was assigned to the 15 Brigade, 5th Canadian Division, on 13 February 1917. Remaining in England, seeing the 5th Division 'officially' disbanded in April 1918, the 104th was finally broken up and, its remaining Islanders, absorbed by the 13th Reserve Battalion.

After the July 1916 departure of 105th Battalion, to England, the 82nd Regiment Abegweit Light Infantry continued recruiting, across the island. Authorized to recruit two drafts of replacements, on an establishment of 109 each, one officer and 50 other ranks were enrolled at Charlottetown and an equal number volunteered in Summerside. When ready, this smaller reinforcement draft was sent directly to their now designated CEF parent – the 13th Reserve (NB) Battalion in England, sailing from Halifax embarked on the SS Olympic on 2 June 1917. Then, later, as an OMFC administrative and CEF staff exercise, on 12 October 1917, the 105th Battalion was removed from the order of battle.

The 105th Battalion (Prince Edward Island Highlanders), CEF is perpetuated by The Prince Edward Island Regiment (RCAC).

== The commanding officer: Lt-Col A.E. Ings ==
A. Ernest Ings was born on 11 May 1866, in Charlottetown, PEI, the youngest child of John Ings and Mary Jane Yeo, she the daughter of James Yeo of Port Hill, PEI. First attending Prince of Wales College, in January 1880, he entered Cheltenham Proprietary College, in Gloucestershire, England, it having the purpose of educating the sons of gentlemen. There he was noted as an outstanding amateur in XV (rugby) football, coming out in April 1884, his interest in excellence in sport remained with him, in life, as he was later absorbed as Captain of the Abegweit Football Club, a lead organizer of local amateur athletics, and of golf, in Charlottetown.

Studying to become a barrister, called to the bar in 1895, as the junior, he joined the established practice of two future premiers, Peters and Peters, eventually becoming a partner. When not engaged in legal matters, or managing his father's interests, he stood as a director in both the Charlottetown Steam Company and the Telephone Company, and as secretary of Charlottetown Light and Power. In April 1910, as one of three founding shareholders, he joined in the coming together of the new Maritime Telegraph & Telephone Company Limited and soon saw to its purchase of a noted interest in the Telephone Company of Prince Edward Island (1885) in June 1910.

Like many established gentlemen of Charlottetown, he took up soldiering with the PEI militia, serving for 14 years with 'L' Squadron, Canadian (PEI) Mounted Rifles (from 1901), becoming its Second-in-Command, as it became 36th Regiment, PEI Light Horse (1914). As mobilization of a Maritimes recruited mounted unit took place, a Major, 49 years old, he volunteered to be second-in-command of the 6th Regiment, Canadian Mounted Rifles. Enrolling on 7 June 1915, arriving in England in July 1915, he served with his unit, in France from October 1915 to January 1916. The 6th CMR, mobilized at Amherst, NS, in March 1915, serving as mounted infantry, was broken up, it being dismounted and its remaining Islanders dispersed or absorbed by the newly designated CEF 4th (CMR) and 5th (CMR) Battalions, in January 1916.

Having returned to Canada and again enrolling, the 105th Battalion en route to Halifax, on promotion, Lt-Col Ings was appointed its commanding officer, on 15 July 1916. Taking the Battalion to England, aggressively 'contesting' its reductions in strength, he remained with it until 22 January 1917, when he moved with its remaining Islanders to the 104th (NB) Battalion. Through continued training and multiple re-designations, he commanded the 104th Battalion until 2 March 1918. His second CEF battalion command, again not seeing action in France or Flanders, remained idled in England.

Returning to the Island, his war carried on, as he lost a son, John Walter Ings, on 18 September 1918, then serving as a Lieutenant with 56th Field Company, Royal Engineers. Settled for a short time, having returned to Ings House, at Dundas Esplanade, in 1919, he sold it to the Navy League of Canada, for their use as a Sailors Home. Widowed in 1937, seven years later he died at age 78, having come to leave the Island, on 23 November 1944, in Winnipeg, MB. After a service at St Paul's Church, he was buried in Sherwood Cemetery, beside his wife, at Charlottetown, PE.

== See also ==
- Canadian Forces
- History of the Canadian Army
- Military history of Canada
