= Robert Cyril Claude Brooks =

Youngest Canadian soldier to die in WWII (b. 1930, d. 1944)

- Born: 27 January 1930; Summerside, Prince Edward Island
- Died: 23 September 1944 (aged 14); Coleman, Prince Edward Island
- Burial place: Union Corner Cemetery, Prince Edward Island, Canada
- Relatives: Son of Wanda Maude Brooks (1905–1991) and Eugene Ernest Brooks (1896–1979); Brother Eugene Russell Clair Brooks
- Military career
- Allegiance: Canada
- Branch: Canadian Army
- Service years: 1944
- Nickname: R. C. C. Brooks
- Unit: 17th (Reserve) Armoured Regiment (Prince Edward Island Light Horse)

Robert Cyril Claude Brooks (27 January 1930 – 23 September 1944) was the youngest Canadian soldier to die in the Second World War. A member of the Canadian Reserve Army, he was killed in a training accident at the age of 14 on Prince Edward Island.

== Origins and Death ==
Robert Brooks was the son of Eugene Ernest Brooks and Wanda Maude Brooks. He enlisted in the 17th (Reserve) Armoured Regiment (Prince Edward Island Light Horse) in early 1944, apparently without his parents' permission. Brooks was killed in a training accident near Coleman, PEI, at approximately 7:30 p.m. on 23 September 1944, when a Universal Carrier was driven through a guardrail on a bridge, overturning in the water below. He was trapped beneath the overturned vehicle and drowned, along with two fellow members of the 17th (Reserve) Armoured Regiment, Sergeant D. C. Ramsay and Trooper W.N. Dennis.

== Aftermath ==
The Canadian Pension Commission determined that Boy Brooks' death was "related to military service"; however, his parents received no pension after his death, as the Pension Commission found that "It is not considered that the parents are in a dependent condition at the present time". Brooks' father was a serving member of the RCAF, and his mother was receiving a dependent's allowance and assigned pay from her husband.

Brooks is commemorated in the Canadian Virtual War Memorial and was added to the Canadian Books of Remembrance in June 2018 with Sgt. Ramsay and Tpr. Dennis.

== Bibliography ==
Notes

References

- Black, Dan; Boileau, John (2016). Too Young to Die: Canada's Boy Soldiers, Sailors and Airmen in the Second World War. James Lorimer & Company. ISBN 9781459411739. - Total pages: 488
- Canadian Virtual War Memorial (2020). "Canadian Virtual War Memorial page for Boy R.C.C. Brooks". Library and Archives Canada.
- Commonwealth War Graves Commission (2020). "Commonwealth War Graves Commission Casualty Record Boy R.C.C. Brooks". Commonwealth War Graves Commission.
