= Cape Breton Highlanders =

Infantry regiment of the Canadian Army

The Cape Breton Highlanders
- Active: 1871–present
- Country: Canada
- Branch: Canadian Army
- Type: Line infantry
- Role: Infantry
- Size: One battalion
- Part of: 36 Canadian Brigade Group
- Garrison/HQ: Sydney, Nova Scotia
- Motto: Siol na fear fearail (Scottish Gaelic for 'breed of manly men')
- Colours: Facing colour yellow
- March: Quick – "Highland Laddie"
- Engagements: First World War; Second World War; War in Afghanistan

Insignia
- Tartan: Black Watch

The Cape Breton Highlanders is an infantry regiment of the Canadian Army. It was established in 1871, merged into The Nova Scotia Highlanders in 1954, and re-established as a distinct regiment in 2011. It is part of the 5th Canadian Division's 36 Canadian Brigade Group and is headquartered at Sydney, Nova Scotia.

== Lineage ==
=== The Cape Breton Highlanders ===
- Originated 13 October 1871 in Baddeck, Nova Scotia, as the Victoria Provisional Battalion of Infantry, named after Victoria County
- Redesignated 2 December 1879 as the Victoria "Highland" Provisional Battalion of Infantry
- Redesignated 9 April 1880 as the Victoria Provisional Battalion of Infantry "Argyll Highlanders"
- Redesignated 12 June 1885 as the 94th "Victoria" Battalion of Infantry, "Argyll Highlanders"
- Redesignated 8 May 1900 as the 94th Victoria Regiment "Argyll Highlanders"
- Redesignated 29 March 1920 as The Cape Breton Highlanders
- Redesignated 7 November 1940 as the 2nd (Reserve) Battalion, The Cape Breton Highlanders
- Redesignated 15 February 1946 as The Cape Breton Highlanders
- Reorganized and redesignated 15 September 1954 as the 2nd Battalion of The Nova Scotia Highlanders
- Reorganized and redesignated 9 December 2010 as a separate regiment, The Cape Breton Highlanders

On January 16, 2011, Canadian Defence Minister Peter MacKay announced that the name of the 2nd Battalion Nova Scotia Highlanders (Cape Breton) would revert to the Cape Breton Highlanders. The regiment's rebadging ceremony was held on September 10, 2011, and MacKay presented the regiment its camp flag on October 2, 2011.

=== Lineage chart ===
Lineage chart

1869	Independent infy coys
1871	Victoria Provisional Bn of Infy
1879	Victoria "Highland" Provisional Bn of Infy
1880	Victoria Provisional Bn of Infy "Argyll Highlanders"
1885	94th "Victoria" Bn of Infy, "Argyll Highlanders"
1900	94th Victoria Regt "Argyll Highlanders"
1915	85th "Overseas" Bn, CEF
1916	185th "Overseas" Bn, CEF
1918	Absorbed by 17th Reserve Bn
1920	Disbanded	1st Bn (85th Bn, CEF), The Cape Breton Highlanders	2nd Bn (185th Bn, CEF), (Note: Reserve) The Cape Breton Highlanders
1936	The Cape Breton Highlanders	Disbanded
1940	2nd (Reserve) Bn, The Cape Breton Highlanders
1941	1st Bn, The Cape Breton Highlanders, CASF
1946	Disbanded	The Cape Breton Highlanders
1954	2nd Bn, The NS Highlanders
1955	2nd Bn, The NS Highlanders (Cape Breton)
2010	The Cape Breton Highlanders

== Perpetuations ==
- 85th Battalion (Nova Scotia Highlanders), CEF
- 185th Canadian Infantry Battalion (Cape Breton Highlanders), CEF

== Operational history ==
=== Great War ===
Details of the 94th Victoria Regiment "Argyll Highlanders" were called out on active service on 6 August 1914 for local protection duties.

The 85th Battalion (Nova Scotia Highlanders), CEF was authorized on 10 July 1915 and embarked for Great Britain on 12 October 1916. It disembarked in France on 10 February 1917, where it fought as part of the 12th Infantry Brigade, 4th Canadian Division in France and Flanders until the end of the war. The battalion was subsequently disbanded on 15 September 1920.

The 185th Canadian Infantry Battalion (Cape Breton Highlanders), CEF was authorized on 15 July 1916 and embarked for Great Britain on 12 October 1916. There it provided reinforcements for the Canadian Corps in the field until 15 February 1918, when its personnel were absorbed by the 17th Reserve Battalion, CEF. The battalion was subsequently disbanded on 29 November 1918.

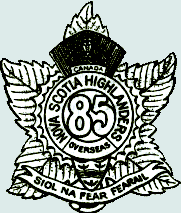
Cap badge of the 85th Battalion Nova Scotia Highlanders

=== Second World War ===
Details of The Cape Breton Highlanders were called out on service on 26 August 1939 and then placed on active service on 1 September 1939, as The Cape Breton Highlanders, CASF (Details), for local protection duties. The details called out on active service were disbanded on 31 December 1940.

The regiment mobilized the 1st Battalion, The Cape Breton Highlanders, CASF, for active service on 1 January 1941. It embarked for Great Britain on 10 November 1941. It landed in Italy on 10 November 1943 as part of the 11th Infantry Brigade, 5th Canadian Armoured Division. The battalion moved to North-West Europe from 20 to 26 February 1945 as part of Operation Goldflake, where it continued to fight until the end of the war. The overseas battalion was disbanded on 15 February 1946.

=== War in Afghanistan ===
The regiment contributed an aggregate of more than 20% of its authorized strength to the various task forces which served in Afghanistan between 2002 and 2014, first as the 2nd Battalion of The Nova Scotia Highlanders, and later on as a separate regiment.

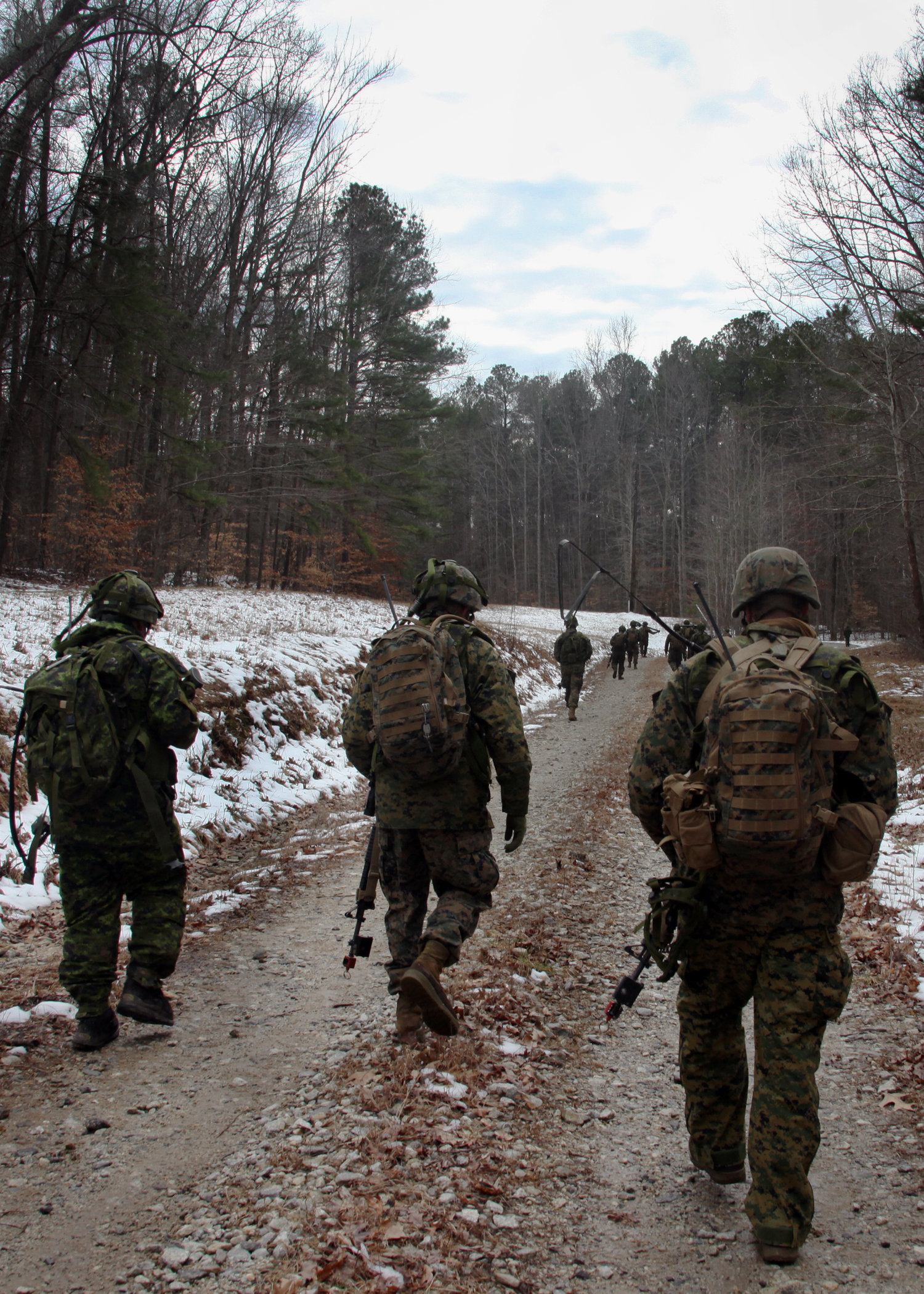
Dave P. Standings, left, A Platoon, 2nd in command with Cape Breton Highlanders attached to the 36th Canadian Brigade

== Battle honours ==
In the list below, battle honours in capitals were awarded for participation in large operations and campaigns, while those in lowercase indicate honours granted for more specific battles. Bold type indicates honours authorized to be emblazoned on regimental colours.

=== Great War ===
- **Arras, 1917, '18**
- **Vimy, 1917**
- **Ypres, 1917**
- **Passchendaele**
- **Amiens**
- Scarpe, 1918
- **Drocourt-Quéant**
- **Hindenburg Line**
- **Canal du Nord**
- **Valenciennes**
- Sambre
- **France and Flanders, 1917–18**

=== Second World War ===
- Liri Valley
- **Melfa Crossing**
- **Ceprano**
- **Gothic Line**
- **Montecchio**
- **Coriano**
- **Lamone Crossing**
- **Fosso Munio**
- Conventello–Comacchio
- **Italy, 1944–1945**
- **IJsselmeer**
- **Delfzijl Pocket**
- North-West Europe, 1945

=== War in Afghanistan ===
- **Afghanistan**

== Media ==
- The Breed of Manly Men : The History of the Cape Breton Highlanders by Alex Morrison, Ted Slaney (2003)

== Order of precedence ==
Preceded by Le Régiment du Saguenay	Cape Breton Highlanders	Succeeded by The Algonquin Regiment (Northern Pioneers)

== Notable people ==
- Daniel J. MacDonald

== See also ==
- Canadian-Scottish regiment
