= North-West Europe 1942 (battle honour) =

North-West Europe 1942 was a battle honour awarded to units of the British and Canadian armies that took part in one or more of the following operations in the Second World War:

- Operation Biting
- St Nazaire Raid
- Operation Myrmidon
- Operation Abercrombie
- Operation Frankton
- Dieppe Raid

== List of units ==
The following units were awarded the battle honour:

=== Canadian regiments ===
- The Toronto Scottish Regiment
- The Royal Regiment of Canada
- The Royal Hamilton Light Infantry
- The Essex Scottish Regiment
- Les Fusiliers Mont-Royal
- The Queen's Own Cameron Highlanders of Canada
- The South Saskatchewan Regiment
- 14th Canadian Armoured Regiment (The Calgary Regiment)

=== British regiments ===
- Parachute Regiment
- Army Commandos (1942–1944)

== See also ==
- North-West Europe campaign of 1940
- North-West Europe Campaign of 1944–1945
