= Corporal to Field Officer =

Canadian Army reference work

- Author: Captain H.P.E. Phillips, MC, and Lieutenant-Colonel R. J. S. Langford
- Language: English
- Genre: Military manual
- Publisher: Copp Clark
- Publication date: 1925, (4th edition, 1940)
- Publication place: Canada
- Media type: Print (softcover, hardcover)
- Pages: Original 196, 4th edition 192

Corporal to Field Officer, 4th Edition Up To Date was a reference work written by Captain H.P.E. Phillips, MC, and Lieutenant-Colonel R. J. S. Langford. It was designed for use by officers and NCOs in the Canadian Army to contain the essentials of all the army's other military manuals. Originally published in 1925, the 4th edition was in use at the beginning of and during World War II.

Both Captain Phillips and Lieutenant Colonel Langford were officers of The Royal Canadian Regiment.

== Significance ==
This edition presents the pre-Blitzkrieg military thinking and order of battle for the Canadian army. Besides being a reference work on how the officers of the day would handle certain situations, it is also a historical look at an army just changing from horse cavalry and foot battalions to tanks and all-arms formations.
