= North Nova Scotia Highlanders =

The North Nova Scotia Highlanders
- Active: 1936–1954
- Country: Canada
- Branch: Canadian Militia (1936–1940); Canadian Army (1940–1954)
- Type: Line infantry
- Role: Infantry
- Size: One battalion
- Part of: Non-Permanent Active Militia (1936–1940); Royal Canadian Infantry Corps; (1942–1954)
- Garrison/HQ: Amherst, Nova Scotia
- Motto: Cos cheum nach gabh tilleadh (Scottish Gaelic for 'Our footsteps will not allow us to go backwards')
- Colors: Facing colour: white
- March: Quick – "The Atholl Highlanders"
- Engagements: Second World War
- Battle honours: See #Battle Honours

Insignia
- Tartan: Murray of Atholl

The North Nova Scotia Highlanders was an infantry regiment of the Canadian Army founded in 1936. In 1954, it was amalgamated with The Pictou Highlanders and 189 LAA RCA Battery to form 1st Battalion, The Nova Scotia Highlanders (North).

== History ==
Founded in 1936 as The North Nova Scotia Highlanders (M.G.) by the amalgamation of The Cumberland Highlanders, The Colchester and Hants Regiment, and 'C' Company, 6th Machine Gun Battalion, it acquired its present title in 1941. The regiment's active service battalion landed on Juno Beach on D-Day, assigned to 9th Canadian Infantry Brigade, 3rd Canadian Infantry Division. In 1954, as a result of the Kennedy Report on the Reserve Army, this regiment was amalgamated The Pictou Highlanders and 189 LAA RCA Battery to form 1st Battalion, The Nova Scotia Highlanders (North).

The North Nova Scotia Highlanders before amalgamation held its final order of precedence as 34.

== Lineage ==
=== The North Nova Scotia Highlanders ===
- Originated in Amherst, Nova Scotia, 6 April 1871 as the Cumberland Provisional Battalion of Infantry.
- Redesignated as the 93rd Cumberland Battalion of Infantry, 12 June 1885.
- Redesignated as the 93rd Cumberland Regiment, on 8 May 1900.
- Redesignated as The Cumberland Regiment, 29 March 1920.
- Redesignated as The Cumberland Highlanders, 15 June 1927.
- Amalgamated on 1 December 1936 with The Colchester and Hants Regiment (less 'C Company') and C Company of the 6th Machine Gun Battalion, CMGC (now The Princess Louise Fusiliers) and redesignated as The North Nova Scotia Highlanders (Machine Gun).
- Redesignated as the 2nd (Reserve) Battalion, The North Nova Scotia Highlanders (Machine Gun), 7 November 1940.
- Redesignated as the 2nd (Reserve) Battalion, The North Nova Scotia Highlanders, 7 March 1941.
- Redesignated as The North Nova Scotia Highlanders, 1 May 1946.
- Amalgamated on 12 November 1954 with The Pictou Highlanders (Motor) and the 189th Light Anti-Aircraft Battery, RCA as the 1st Battalion, The Nova Scotia Highlanders (North).

=== The Colchester and Hants Regiment ===
- Originated on 1 April 1910, in Truro, Nova Scotia as the 70th Colchester and Hants Regiment .
- Redesignated on 2 May 1910, as the 76th Colchester and Hants Rifles.
- Amalgamated on 1 April 1920, with the 81st Hants Regiment and Redesignated as The Colchester and Hants Regiment.
- Amalgamated on 1 December 1936, with The Cumberland Highlanders and “C” Company of the 6th Machine Gun Battalion, CMGC to form The North Nova Scotia Highlanders (Machine Gun).

=== The 81st Hants Regiment ===
- Originated on 16 February 1914, in Windsor, Nova Scotia, as a Regiment of Infantry in Hants County.
- Redesignated on 1 May 1914, as the 68th Regiment.
- Redesignated again on 1 June 1914, as the 81st Hants Regiment.
- Amalgamated on 15 May 1920, with the 76th Colchester and Hants Rifles and Redesignated as The Colchester and Hants Regiment.

== Perpetuations ==
The regiment perpetuated the following units of the Great War:

- 25th Battalion (Nova Scotia Rifles), CEF
- 106th Battalion (Nova Scotia Rifles), CEF
- 193rd Battalion (Nova Scotia Highlanders), CEF

== Alliances and uniform ==
The North Nova Scotia Highlanders were allied to the South Staffordshire Regiment and were kitted with a blue glengarry with diced border, scarlet doublet, white sporran with five black points, scarlet and green hose, green garter flashes with full dress only for pipers and drummers.

== Battle honours ==
Only uppercase honours are displayed on the guidon.

War of 1812:

DEFENCE OF CANADA – 1812–1815 (honorary distinction)

Boer War:

SOUTH AFRICA 1899–1900

First World War:

- MONT SORREL
- Somme
  - 1916
  - '18
- Flers-Courcelette
- Thiepval
- Ancre Heights
- Arras
  - 1917
  - '18
- Vimy 1917
- Arleux
- Scarpe
  - 1917
  - '18
- Hill 70
- YPRES, 1917
- Passchendaele
- AMIENS
- HINDENBURG LINE
- Canal du Nord
- Cambrai, 1918
- PURSUIT TO MONS
- FRANCE AND FLANDERS, 1915–18

Second World War:

- NORMANDY LANDING
- Authie
- CAEN
- The Orne
- BOURGUÉBUS RIDGE
- Faubourg de Vaucelles
- Verrières Ridge – Tilly-la-Campagne
- FALAISE
- The Laison
- Battle of Chambois
- Boulogne, 1944
- Calais, 1944
- THE SCHELDT
- Savojaards Plaat
- Breskens Pocket
- THE RHINELAND
- Waal Flats
- The Hochwald
- THE RHINE
- Zutphen
- Leer
- NORTH-WEST EUROPE, 1944–1945

== Ardenne Abbey Massacre ==
During the Second World War, Major General Kurt Meyer of the Waffen SS murdered captured soldiers from the regiment. After the war he was tried and convicted in Canada. Sentenced to death on 28 December 1945, his sentence was commuted to life imprisonment on 14 January 1946. After serving nearly nine years in prison, Meyer was released on 7 September 1954.

== See also ==
- Canadian-Scottish regiment

== Bibliography ==
- Barnes, RM, The Uniforms and History of the Scottish Regiments, London, Sphere Books Limited, 1972.
- Brode, Patrick. "Casual Slaughters and Accidental Judgments: Canadian War Crimes Prosecutions, 1944-1948." Toronto: The Osgoode Society for Canadian Legal History, 1997.
- Campbell, Ian. "Murder at the Abbaye: The Story of Twenty Canadian Soldiers Murdered at the Abbaye d’Ardenne." Ottawa: The Golden Dog Press, 1996.
- Volume 3, Part 2: Infantry Regiments – THE NOVA SCOTIA HIGHLANDERS
