= North-West Europe campaign of 1940 =

North-West Europe campaign of 1940 is a battle honour given to several regiments in the British Army. It refers to the land campaign starting with the invasion of France in May 1940, and ending with the evacuation of the British Expeditionary Force from Dunkirk and other ports.

== List of units ==
The following units were awarded the battle honour,

- East Lancashire Regiment
- South Lancashire Regiment
- The Loyal Regiment (North Lancashire)
- Duke of Wellington's Regiment
- Grenadier Guards
- South Staffordshire Regiment
- Gloucestershire Regiment
- Coldstream Guards
- West Yorkshire Regiment
- 1st The Queen's Dragoon Guards
- Royal Dragoon Guards

== See also ==
- North-West Europe 1942 (Battle honour)
- North-West Europe campaign of 1944–45
