= North-West Europe campaign of 1944–45 =

British battle honour

North-West Europe 1944–1945 is a battle honour (more properly known as an honorary distinction) earned by regiments of the British Commonwealth forces during the Second World War that took part in the actions of the northern part of the war's Western Front. The battle honour North-West Europe is suffixed with the year, or years, in which the awarded unit took part in the action.

It refers to the land campaign starting with the 6th June landings in Normandy and ended with Field Marshal Montgomery taking the German military surrender of all German forces in the Netherlands, Northwest Germany and Denmark on Lüneburg Heath in Northwest Germany. The campaign was conducted by Supreme Headquarters Allied Expeditionary Force, of which the British 21st Army Group was a component, along with the American 12th and 6th Army Groups. Together, the three army groups comprised the Allied effort on the Western Front which at its longest stretched from the North Sea to Switzerland.

The battle honours for the Second World War were not awarded until 1957/58 by which point some units had amalgamated or been disbanded.

== List of units ==
The following units were awarded the battle honour,

=== Canadian regiments ===
- The Toronto Scottish Regiment (1944–1945)
- The Royal Regiment of Canada (1944–1945)
- The Royal Hamilton Light Infantry (1944–1945)
- The Essex Scottish Regiment (1944–1945)
- Les Fusiliers Mont-Royal (1944–1945)
- The Queen's Own Cameron Highlanders of Canada (1944–1945)
- The South Saskatchewan Regiment (1944–1945)
- 14th Canadian Armoured Regiment (The Calgary Regiment) (1945)
- The Elgin Regiment (1944–1945)
- The Royal Montreal Regiment (1944–1945)
- The Lorne Scots (Peel, Dufferin and Halton Regiment) (1944–1945)
- 12th Manitoba Dragoons (1944–1945)
- 8th Canadian Reconnaissance Regiment (14th Canadian Hussars) (1944–1945)
- 7th Canadian Reconnaissance Regiment (17th Duke of York's Royal Canadian Hussars) (1944–1945)
- The Cameron Highlanders of Ottawa (1944–1945)
- 29th Canadian Armoured Reconnaissance Regiment (The South Alberta Regiment) (1944–1945)
- The New Brunswick Rangers (1944–1945)
- The Lake Superior Regiment (Motor) (1944–1945)
- The Black Watch (Royal Highland Regiment) of Canada (1944–1945)
- Le Régiment de Maisonneuve (1944–1945)
- The Calgary Highlanders (1944–1945)
- The Royal Winnipeg Rifles (1944–1945)
- The Regina Rifle Regiment (1944–1945)
- The Canadian Scottish Regiment (1944–1945)
- The Queen's Own Rifles of Canada (1944–1945)
- Le Régiment de la Chaudière (1944–1945)
- The North Shore (New Brunswick) Regiment (1944–1945)
- The Highland Light Infantry of Canada (1944–1945)
- The Stormont, Dundas and Glengarry Highlanders (1944–1945)
- The North Nova Scotia Highlanders (1944–1945)
- The Lincoln and Welland Regiment (1944–1945)
- The Algonquin Regiment (1944–1945)
- The Argyll and Sutherland Highlanders of Canada (Princess Louise's) (1944–1945)
- 6th Canadian Armoured Regiment (1st Hussars) (1944–1945)
- 10th Canadian Armoured Regiment (The Fort Garry Horse) (1944–1945)
- 27th Canadian Armoured Regiment (The Sherbrooke Fusilier Regiment) (1944–1945)
- 21st Armoured Regiment (The Governor General's Foot Guards) (1944–1945)
- 22nd Armoured Regiment (The Grenadier Guards) (1944–1945)
- 28th Armoured Regiment (The British Columbia Regiment) (1944–1945)
- 1st Canadian Armoured Carrier Regiment (1944–1945)
- 1st Canadian Parachute Battalion (1944–1945)
- 1st Armoured Car Regiment (Royal Canadian Dragoons) (1945)
- 4th Reconnaissance Regiment (4th Princess Louise Dragoon Guards) (1945)
- The Saskatoon Light Infantry (1945)
- 3rd Armoured Reconnaissance Regiment (The Governor General's Horse Guards) (1945)
- The Westminster Regiment (Motor) (1945)
- The Princess Louise Fusiliers (1945)
- The Royal Canadian Regiment (1945)
- 48th Highlanders of Canada (1945)
- The Seaforth Highlanders of Canada (1945)
- Princess Patricia's Canadian Light Infantry (1945)
- The Hastings and Prince Edward Regiment (1945)
- The Loyal Edmonton Regiment (1945)
- Royal 22^{e} Régiment (1945)
- The Carleton and York Regiment (1945)
- The West Nova Scotia Regiment (1945)
- The Perth Regiment (1945)
- The Cape Breton Highlanders (1945)
- The Irish Regiment of Canada (1945)
- 11th Canadian Armoured Regiment (The Ontario Regiment) (1945)
- 12th Canadian Armoured Regiment (The Three Rivers Regiment) (1945)
- 2nd Armoured Regiment (Lord Strathcona's Horse (Royal Canadians)) (1945)
- 5th Armoured Regiment (8th Princess Louise's (New Brunswick) Hussars) (1945)
- 9th Armoured Regiment (The British Columbia Dragoons) (1945)
- Prince Edward Island Regiment for actions of Prince Edward Island Light Horse (1944–1945)

=== US-Canadian forces ===
- First Special Service Force (1944)

=== British regiments ===
- Honourable Artillery Company (1944–1945)
- Royal Norfolk Regiment (1944–45)
- East Lancashire Regiment (1944–1945)
- Fife and Forfar Yeomanry (1944-45)
- South Lancashire Regiment (1944–1945)
- Suffolk Regiment
- Coldstream Guards (1944–1945)
- Irish Guards
- Grenadier Guards (1944–1945)
- Welsh Guards
- 3rd County of London Yeomanry (Sharpshooters)
- Duke of Wellington's Regiment (1944–1945)
- Parachute Regiment (1944–1945)
- South Staffordshire Regiment (1944)
- Army Commandos (1942–1944), in the form of honours granted to the Commandos Association.
- Manchester Regiment (New 1st Battalion) (1944–1945)
- Gloucestershire Regiment (1944–1945)
- Life Guards
- Royal Horse Guards

== See also ==
- North-West Europe campaign of 1940
- North-West Europe 1942 (Battle honour)
