= 17th Battalion (Nova Scotia Highlanders), CEF =

- Active: 1914-1917
- Country: Canada
- Branch: Canadian Expeditionary Force
- Role: Infantry
- Size: battalion
- Engagements: First World War

The 17th Battalion, CEF was a battalion of the Canadian Expeditionary Force during the Great War.

== History ==
The 17th Battalion, CEF was authorized on 19 September 1914 and embarked for Great Britain on 29 September 1914 where it was redesignated as the 17th Reserve Battalion, CEF on 29 April 1915, to provide reinforcements for the Canadian Corps in the field. The battalion was eventually disbanded on 21 May 1917.

The 17th Battalion, along with the 9th, 11th and 12th Reserve Battalions formed the Canadian Training Depot at Tidworth Barracks.

The battalion recruited in Nova Scotia and was mobilized at Camp Valcartier, Quebec.

The battalion had three Officers Commanding:

- Lt.-Col. S.G. Robertson – 22 September 1914 – 30 January 1915
- Lt.-Col. E.B. Worthington – 30 January 1915 – 1 September 1915
- Lt.-Col. D.D. Cameron – 1 September 1915 – 4 January 1917

== Perpetuations ==
The 17th Battalion, CEF is perpetuated by the Nova Scotia Highlanders.

== Battle honours ==
The battalion was awarded the battle honour "The Great War, 1914–17".

== Sources ==
Canadian Expeditionary Force 1914–1919 by Col. G.W.L. Nicholson, CD, Queen's Printer, Ottawa, Ontario, 1962

== See also ==
- List of infantry battalions in the Canadian Expeditionary Force
- History of the Canadian Army
- Non-Permanent Active Militia
