= Aldershot (disambiguation) =

Aldershot is a town in Hampshire, England.

Aldershot may also refer to:

- Aldershot railway station, a railway station in the English town
- Aldershot (UK Parliament constituency)
- Aldershot F.C., a football team from the English town; dissolved in 1992
- Aldershot Town F.C., the current football team from the English town
- Aldershot, Ontario, an unincorporated community in Canada
  - Aldershot GO Station, a station in the GO Transit network located in the community
  - Aldershot School, a Grade 7-12 school located in the community
- Aldershot, Nova Scotia, Canada
  - 5th Canadian Division Support Base Detachment Aldershot, Canadian Forces base
- Aldershot, Queensland, a town in Australia
- SS Aldershot, a number of ships with this name

== See also ==
- Aldershot Command
- Aldershot Garrison also known as Aldershot Military Town, is a major garrison in South East England
- Aldershot & District Football League
- Aldershot & District Traction
