= 2010 Canadian Senior Curling Championships =

2010 World Financial Group Canadian Senior Curling Championships
- Host city: Ottawa, Ontario
- Arena: Ottawa Hunt and Golf Club
- Dates: March 20–28
- Men's winner: Alberta
- Curling club: Thistle CC, Edmonton
- Skip: Mark Johnson
- Third: Marv Wirth
- Second: Ken McLean
- Lead: Millard Evans
- Finalist: Ontario
- Women's winner: British Columbia
- Curling club: Juan de Fuca CC, Victoria
- Skip: Christine Jurgenson
- Third: Cheryl Noble
- Second: Pat Sanders
- Lead: Roselyn Craig
- Finalist: New Brunswick

The 2010 Canadian Senior Curling Championships were held March 20–28 at the Ottawa Hunt and Golf Club in Ottawa, Ontario. The winning teams represented Canada at the 2011 World Senior Curling Championships, and swept the event with double gold medals.

== Men's ==
=== Teams ===
| Team | Skip | Third | Second | Lead | Club |
|---|---|---|---|---|---|
| Alberta | Mark Johnson | Marv Wirth | Ken McLean | Millard Evans | Thistle CC, Edmonton |
| British Columbia | Wes Craig | Philip Olson | Tony Anslow | Blair Cusack | Juan de Fuca CC, Victoria |
| Manitoba | Rob Ramage | Shawn McCutheon | Laurie Stewart | Dave Boutet | Baldur CC, Baldur |
| New Brunswick | Robert MacDiarmid | Peter Myers | David Cogswell | Danny MacDonald | Beaver CC, Moncton |
| Newfoundland and Labrador | Gary Oke | Bob Skanes | Peter Matthews | Jim Goodyear | Gander CC, Gander |
| Northern Ontario | Al Hackner | Art Lappalainen | Al Laine | Brian Adams | Fort William CC, Thunder Bay |
| Nova Scotia | Brian Rafuse | Curt Palmer | Alan Darragh | Dave Slauenwhite | Lakeshore CC, Lower Sackville |
| Ontario | Gareth Parry | Frank McCourt | Len Rominger | Ken Armstrong | Brant CC, Brantford |
| Prince Edward Island | Peter MacDonald | Peter Gallant | Rod MacDonald | Doug MacGregor | Charlottetown CC, Charlottetown |
| Quebec | Pierre Charette | Louis Biron | Maurice Cayouette | Marco Ferraro | Thurso CC, Thurso |
| Saskatchewan | Brad Heidt | Gerald Shymko | Dan Ormsby | Dale Hannon | Kerrobert CC, Kerrobert |
| Yukon/Northwest Territories | George Hilderman | Pat Molloy | Dale Enzenauer | Clarence Jack | Whitehorse CC, Whitehorse |

=== Standings ===
| Province | W | L |
|---|---|---|
| Ontario | 9 | 2 |
| Saskatchewan | 9 | 2 |
| Alberta | 8 | 3 |
| Northern Ontario | 7 | 4 |
| Nova Scotia | 6 | 5 |
| Quebec | 6 | 5 |
| British Columbia | 5 | 6 |
| Prince Edward Island | 5 | 6 |
| Manitoba | 4 | 7 |
| Yukon/Northwest Territories | 3 | 8 |
| Newfoundland and Labrador | 3 | 8 |
| New Brunswick | 1 | 10 |

=== Results ===
==== Draw 2 ====
| Sheet A | 1 | 2 | 3 | 4 | 5 | 6 | 7 | 8 | 9 | 10 | Final |
|---|---|---|---|---|---|---|---|---|---|---|---|
| Newfoundland and Labrador (Oke) 🔨 | 0 | 0 | 0 | 2 | 1 | 0 | 0 | 2 | 0 | 0 | 5 |
| Quebec (Charette) | 0 | 0 | 1 | 0 | 0 | 0 | 2 | 0 | 2 | 1 | 6 |

| Sheet B | 1 | 2 | 3 | 4 | 5 | 6 | 7 | 8 | 9 | 10 | Final |
|---|---|---|---|---|---|---|---|---|---|---|---|
| Alberta (Johnson) 🔨 | 1 | 0 | 2 | 2 | 0 | 2 | 0 | 2 | X | X | 9 |
| Prince Edward Island (MacDonald) | 0 | 1 | 0 | 0 | 1 | 0 | 1 | 0 | X | X | 3 |

| Sheet C | 1 | 2 | 3 | 4 | 5 | 6 | 7 | 8 | 9 | 10 | Final |
|---|---|---|---|---|---|---|---|---|---|---|---|
| Nova Scotia (Rafuse) | 0 | 1 | 2 | 0 | 0 | 1 | 0 | 0 | 1 | 0 | 5 |
| Northern Ontario (Hackner) 🔨 | 1 | 0 | 0 | 2 | 1 | 0 | 0 | 3 | 0 | 0 | 7 |

| Sheet D | 1 | 2 | 3 | 4 | 5 | 6 | 7 | 8 | 9 | 10 | Final |
|---|---|---|---|---|---|---|---|---|---|---|---|
| New Brunswick (MacDiarmid) | 0 | 0 | 1 | 1 | 0 | 2 | 0 | 2 | X | X | 6 |
| British Columbia (Craig) 🔨 | 1 | 2 | 0 | 0 | 1 | 0 | 6 | 0 | X | X | 10 |

| Sheet E | 1 | 2 | 3 | 4 | 5 | 6 | 7 | 8 | 9 | 10 | Final |
|---|---|---|---|---|---|---|---|---|---|---|---|
| Manitoba (Ramage) | 0 | 0 | 1 | 0 | 1 | 0 | 0 | 1 | 0 | X | 3 |
| Ontario (Parry) 🔨 | 0 | 1 | 0 | 1 | 0 | 1 | 2 | 0 | 3 | X | 8 |

| Sheet F | 1 | 2 | 3 | 4 | 5 | 6 | 7 | 8 | 9 | 10 | Final |
|---|---|---|---|---|---|---|---|---|---|---|---|
| Saskatchewan (Heidt) 🔨 | 2 | 0 | 0 | 1 | 1 | 0 | 0 | 3 | 0 | 0 | 7 |
| Yukon/Northwest Territories (Hilderman) | 0 | 1 | 2 | 0 | 0 | 0 | 1 | 0 | 1 | 1 | 6 |

==== Draw 4 ====
| Sheet A | 1 | 2 | 3 | 4 | 5 | 6 | 7 | 8 | 9 | 10 | Final |
|---|---|---|---|---|---|---|---|---|---|---|---|
| New Brunswick (MacDiarmid) | 0 | 2 | 0 | 1 | 0 | 0 | 1 | 0 | 0 | 0 | 4 |
| Manitoba (Ramage) 🔨 | 1 | 0 | 1 | 0 | 1 | 1 | 0 | 1 | 0 | 1 | 6 |

| Sheet B | 1 | 2 | 3 | 4 | 5 | 6 | 7 | 8 | 9 | 10 | Final |
|---|---|---|---|---|---|---|---|---|---|---|---|
| British Columbia (Craig) 🔨 | 3 | 0 | 0 | 2 | 1 | 2 | 0 | 0 | 2 | X | 10 |
| Nova Scotia (Rafuse) | 0 | 0 | 1 | 0 | 0 | 0 | 3 | 1 | 0 | X | 5 |

| Sheet C | 1 | 2 | 3 | 4 | 5 | 6 | 7 | 8 | 9 | 10 | Final |
|---|---|---|---|---|---|---|---|---|---|---|---|
| Saskatchewan (Heidt) 🔨 | 1 | 0 | 2 | 1 | 0 | 0 | 1 | 0 | 0 | 1 | 6 |
| Newfoundland and Labrador (Oke) | 0 | 1 | 0 | 0 | 3 | 0 | 0 | 0 | 1 | 0 | 5 |

| Sheet D | 1 | 2 | 3 | 4 | 5 | 6 | 7 | 8 | 9 | 10 | Final |
|---|---|---|---|---|---|---|---|---|---|---|---|
| Prince Edward Island (MacDonald) 🔨 | 3 | 0 | 4 | 1 | 0 | 1 | 0 | 0 | X | X | 9 |
| Yukon/Northwest Territories (Hilderman) | 0 | 1 | 0 | 0 | 3 | 0 | 1 | 0 | X | X | 5 |

| Sheet E | 1 | 2 | 3 | 4 | 5 | 6 | 7 | 8 | 9 | 10 | Final |
|---|---|---|---|---|---|---|---|---|---|---|---|
| Alberta (Johnson) 🔨 | 0 | 2 | 0 | 0 | 1 | 0 | 2 | 1 | 0 | 0 | 6 |
| Quebec (Charette) | 0 | 0 | 1 | 1 | 0 | 1 | 0 | 0 | 2 | 2 | 7 |

| Sheet F | 1 | 2 | 3 | 4 | 5 | 6 | 7 | 8 | 9 | 10 | Final |
|---|---|---|---|---|---|---|---|---|---|---|---|
| Northern Ontario (Hackner) | 0 | 0 | 1 | 1 | 1 | 0 | 1 | 0 | 1 | 0 | 5 |
| Ontario (Parry) 🔨 | 2 | 1 | 0 | 0 | 0 | 2 | 0 | 0 | 0 | 1 | 6 |

==== Draw 5 ====
| Sheet A | 1 | 2 | 3 | 4 | 5 | 6 | 7 | 8 | 9 | 10 | Final |
|---|---|---|---|---|---|---|---|---|---|---|---|
| British Columbia (Craig) 🔨 | 2 | 1 | 1 | 0 | 3 | 1 | X | X | X | X | 8 |
| Prince Edward Island (MacDonald) | 0 | 0 | 0 | 1 | 0 | 0 | X | X | X | X | 1 |

| Sheet B | 1 | 2 | 3 | 4 | 5 | 6 | 7 | 8 | 9 | 10 | Final |
|---|---|---|---|---|---|---|---|---|---|---|---|
| Saskatchewan (Heidt) | 1 | 0 | 2 | 0 | 4 | 0 | 0 | 3 | X | X | 10 |
| Quebec (Charette) 🔨 | 0 | 1 | 0 | 1 | 0 | 1 | 1 | 0 | X | X | 4 |

| Sheet C | 1 | 2 | 3 | 4 | 5 | 6 | 7 | 8 | 9 | 10 | Final |
|---|---|---|---|---|---|---|---|---|---|---|---|
| Manitoba (Ramage) | 0 | 0 | 1 | 1 | 0 | 0 | 1 | 0 | 1 | 0 | 4 |
| Northern Ontario (Hackner) 🔨 | 1 | 1 | 0 | 0 | 0 | 1 | 0 | 2 | 0 | 0 | 5 |

==== Draw 6 ====
| Sheet C | 1 | 2 | 3 | 4 | 5 | 6 | 7 | 8 | 9 | 10 | 11 | Final |
|---|---|---|---|---|---|---|---|---|---|---|---|---|
| New Brunswick (MacDiarmid) 🔨 | 1 | 0 | 1 | 0 | 1 | 0 | 1 | 0 | 1 | 1 | 0 | 6 |
| Ontario (Parry) | 0 | 1 | 0 | 2 | 0 | 2 | 0 | 1 | 0 | 0 | 2 | 8 |

| Sheet E | 1 | 2 | 3 | 4 | 5 | 6 | 7 | 8 | 9 | 10 | Final |
|---|---|---|---|---|---|---|---|---|---|---|---|
| Nova Scotia (Rafuse) 🔨 | 0 | 1 | 1 | 0 | 0 | 0 | 1 | 1 | 0 | 1 | 5 |
| Yukon/Northwest Territories (Hilderman) | 0 | 0 | 0 | 1 | 1 | 0 | 0 | 0 | 2 | 0 | 4 |

| Sheet F | 1 | 2 | 3 | 4 | 5 | 6 | 7 | 8 | 9 | 10 | Final |
|---|---|---|---|---|---|---|---|---|---|---|---|
| Newfoundland and Labrador (Oke) | 0 | 1 | 0 | 1 | 0 | 0 | 0 | 3 | 0 | 0 | 5 |
| Alberta (Johnson) 🔨 | 1 | 0 | 2 | 0 | 0 | 0 | 1 | 0 | 0 | 2 | 6 |

==== Draw 7 ====
| Sheet A | 1 | 2 | 3 | 4 | 5 | 6 | 7 | 8 | 9 | 10 | 11 | Final |
|---|---|---|---|---|---|---|---|---|---|---|---|---|
| Quebec (Charette) | 1 | 0 | 0 | 2 | 0 | 2 | 0 | 1 | 0 | 0 | 1 | 7 |
| Northern Ontario (Hackner) 🔨 | 0 | 2 | 0 | 0 | 1 | 0 | 1 | 0 | 1 | 1 | 0 | 6 |

| Sheet C | 1 | 2 | 3 | 4 | 5 | 6 | 7 | 8 | 9 | 10 | Final |
|---|---|---|---|---|---|---|---|---|---|---|---|
| Manitoba (Ramage) | 0 | 1 | 0 | 0 | 1 | 0 | 0 | X | X | X | 2 |
| Prince Edward Island (MacDonald) 🔨 | 3 | 0 | 3 | 1 | 0 | 1 | 1 | X | X | X | 9 |

| Sheet E | 1 | 2 | 3 | 4 | 5 | 6 | 7 | 8 | 9 | 10 | Final |
|---|---|---|---|---|---|---|---|---|---|---|---|
| Saskatchewan (Heidt) | 0 | 3 | 0 | 0 | 2 | 1 | 0 | 1 | 0 | 2 | 9 |
| British Columbia (Craig) 🔨 | 2 | 0 | 1 | 2 | 0 | 0 | 1 | 0 | 2 | 0 | 8 |

==== Draw 8 ====
| Sheet B | 1 | 2 | 3 | 4 | 5 | 6 | 7 | 8 | 9 | 10 | Final |
|---|---|---|---|---|---|---|---|---|---|---|---|
| Yukon/Northwest Territories (Hilderman) | 0 | 0 | 1 | 0 | 1 | 0 | 0 | X | X | X | 2 |
| Alberta (Johnson) 🔨 | 2 | 2 | 0 | 3 | 0 | 3 | 0 | X | X | X | 10 |

| Sheet D | 1 | 2 | 3 | 4 | 5 | 6 | 7 | 8 | 9 | 10 | Final |
|---|---|---|---|---|---|---|---|---|---|---|---|
| Ontario (Parry) | 1 | 0 | 2 | 0 | 0 | 1 | 0 | 1 | 0 | 0 | 5 |
| Newfoundland and Labrador (Oke) 🔨 | 0 | 2 | 0 | 1 | 0 | 0 | 2 | 0 | 1 | 1 | 7 |

| Sheet F | 1 | 2 | 3 | 4 | 5 | 6 | 7 | 8 | 9 | 10 | Final |
|---|---|---|---|---|---|---|---|---|---|---|---|
| Nova Scotia (Rafuse) 🔨 | 0 | 1 | 0 | 0 | 3 | 0 | 1 | 0 | 0 | 1 | 6 |
| New Brunswick (MacDiarmid) | 0 | 0 | 0 | 1 | 0 | 2 | 0 | 1 | 1 | 0 | 5 |

==== Draw 9 ====
| Sheet D | 1 | 2 | 3 | 4 | 5 | 6 | 7 | 8 | 9 | 10 | Final |
|---|---|---|---|---|---|---|---|---|---|---|---|
| British Columbia (Craig) 🔨 | 0 | 0 | 0 | 2 | 0 | 0 | 2 | 0 | X | X | 4 |
| Quebec (Charette) | 0 | 0 | 5 | 0 | 2 | 1 | 0 | 1 | X | X | 9 |

| Sheet E | 1 | 2 | 3 | 4 | 5 | 6 | 7 | 8 | 9 | 10 | Final |
|---|---|---|---|---|---|---|---|---|---|---|---|
| Northern Ontario (Hackner) | 0 | 1 | 0 | 1 | 0 | 0 | 2 | 0 | 2 | 1 | 7 |
| Prince Edward Island (MacDonald) 🔨 | 2 | 0 | 1 | 0 | 0 | 2 | 0 | 1 | 0 | 0 | 6 |

| Sheet F | 1 | 2 | 3 | 4 | 5 | 6 | 7 | 8 | 9 | 10 | Final |
|---|---|---|---|---|---|---|---|---|---|---|---|
| Manitoba (Ramage) | 1 | 0 | 0 | 0 | 0 | 0 | 0 | 0 | 0 | 0 | 1 |
| Saskatchewan (Heidt) 🔨 | 0 | 2 | 0 | 0 | 0 | 1 | 0 | 0 | 1 | 0 | 4 |

==== Draw 10 ====
| Sheet A | 1 | 2 | 3 | 4 | 5 | 6 | 7 | 8 | 9 | 10 | Final |
|---|---|---|---|---|---|---|---|---|---|---|---|
| Yukon/Northwest Territories (Hilderman) | 0 | 0 | 1 | 0 | 1 | 0 | 0 | X | X | X | 2 |
| Ontario (Parry) 🔨 | 1 | 3 | 0 | 3 | 0 | 2 | 1 | X | X | X | 10 |

| Sheet B | 1 | 2 | 3 | 4 | 5 | 6 | 7 | 8 | 9 | 10 | Final |
|---|---|---|---|---|---|---|---|---|---|---|---|
| Newfoundland and Labrador (Oke) 🔨 | 2 | 0 | 0 | 2 | 3 | 0 | 1 | X | X | X | 8 |
| New Brunswick (MacDiarmid) | 0 | 0 | 1 | 0 | 0 | 1 | 0 | X | X | X | 2 |

| Sheet C | 1 | 2 | 3 | 4 | 5 | 6 | 7 | 8 | 9 | 10 | Final |
|---|---|---|---|---|---|---|---|---|---|---|---|
| Alberta (Johnson) | 0 | 2 | 0 | 3 | 0 | 2 | 0 | 2 | 0 | 3 | 12 |
| Nova Scotia (Rafuse) 🔨 | 1 | 0 | 1 | 0 | 1 | 0 | 2 | 0 | 2 | 0 | 7 |

==== Draw 11 ====
| Sheet D | 1 | 2 | 3 | 4 | 5 | 6 | 7 | 8 | 9 | 10 | Final |
|---|---|---|---|---|---|---|---|---|---|---|---|
| Saskatchewan (Heidt) 🔨 | 1 | 0 | 1 | 0 | 1 | 1 | 0 | 2 | 1 | 0 | 7 |
| Prince Edward Island (MacDonald) | 0 | 2 | 0 | 1 | 0 | 0 | 2 | 0 | 0 | 0 | 5 |

| Sheet E | 1 | 2 | 3 | 4 | 5 | 6 | 7 | 8 | 9 | 10 | 11 | Final |
|---|---|---|---|---|---|---|---|---|---|---|---|---|
| Quebec (Charette) 🔨 | 1 | 0 | 0 | 0 | 0 | 2 | 0 | 1 | 0 | 2 | 1 | 7 |
| Manitoba (Ramage) | 0 | 1 | 0 | 1 | 0 | 0 | 1 | 0 | 3 | 0 | 0 | 6 |

| Sheet F | 1 | 2 | 3 | 4 | 5 | 6 | 7 | 8 | 9 | 10 | Final |
|---|---|---|---|---|---|---|---|---|---|---|---|
| British Columbia (Craig) 🔨 | 2 | 0 | 0 | 1 | 0 | 0 | 1 | 0 | 2 | 0 | 6 |
| Northern Ontario (Hackner) | 0 | 1 | 1 | 0 | 3 | 1 | 0 | 1 | 0 | 1 | 8 |

==== Draw 12 ====
| Sheet A | 1 | 2 | 3 | 4 | 5 | 6 | 7 | 8 | 9 | 10 | Final |
|---|---|---|---|---|---|---|---|---|---|---|---|
| Alberta (Johnson) 🔨 | 2 | 1 | 0 | 3 | 2 | 0 | 1 | X | X | X | 9 |
| New Brunswick (MacDiarmid) | 0 | 0 | 2 | 0 | 0 | 1 | 0 | X | X | X | 3 |

| Sheet B | 1 | 2 | 3 | 4 | 5 | 6 | 7 | 8 | 9 | 10 | Final |
|---|---|---|---|---|---|---|---|---|---|---|---|
| Nova Scotia (Rafuse) 🔨 | 1 | 0 | 1 | 0 | 1 | 0 | 0 | 0 | 2 | 2 | 7 |
| Ontario (Parry) | 0 | 1 | 0 | 1 | 0 | 1 | 1 | 0 | 0 | 0 | 4 |

| Sheet C | 1 | 2 | 3 | 4 | 5 | 6 | 7 | 8 | 9 | 10 | Final |
|---|---|---|---|---|---|---|---|---|---|---|---|
| Newfoundland and Labrador (Oke) | 0 | 0 | 0 | 0 | 1 | 0 | 2 | 0 | 0 | 0 | 3 |
| Yukon/Northwest Territories (Hilderman) 🔨 | 1 | 0 | 1 | 0 | 0 | 1 | 0 | 1 | 0 | 1 | 5 |

==== Draw 13 ====
| Sheet B | 1 | 2 | 3 | 4 | 5 | 6 | 7 | 8 | 9 | 10 | Final |
|---|---|---|---|---|---|---|---|---|---|---|---|
| Manitoba (Ramage) 🔨 | 2 | 1 | 0 | 0 | 0 | 1 | 0 | 2 | 0 | 0 | 6 |
| British Columbia (Craig) | 0 | 0 | 1 | 1 | 1 | 0 | 2 | 0 | 2 | 1 | 8 |

| Sheet C | 1 | 2 | 3 | 4 | 5 | 6 | 7 | 8 | 9 | 10 | Final |
|---|---|---|---|---|---|---|---|---|---|---|---|
| Northern Ontario (Hackner) | 0 | 3 | 0 | 0 | 0 | 0 | 1 | 0 | X | X | 4 |
| Saskatchewan (Heidt) 🔨 | 2 | 0 | 2 | 1 | 2 | 1 | 0 | 2 | X | X | 10 |

| Sheet F | 1 | 2 | 3 | 4 | 5 | 6 | 7 | 8 | 9 | 10 | Final |
|---|---|---|---|---|---|---|---|---|---|---|---|
| Quebec (Charette) | 0 | 1 | 0 | 2 | 0 | 1 | 0 | 0 | 0 | 0 | 4 |
| Prince Edward Island (MacDonald) 🔨 | 1 | 0 | 1 | 0 | 1 | 0 | 0 | 1 | 1 | 1 | 6 |

==== Draw 14 ====
| Sheet A | 1 | 2 | 3 | 4 | 5 | 6 | 7 | 8 | 9 | 10 | 11 | Final |
|---|---|---|---|---|---|---|---|---|---|---|---|---|
| Nova Scotia (Rafuse) | 0 | 2 | 0 | 2 | 0 | 1 | 0 | 0 | 0 | 1 | 0 | 6 |
| Newfoundland and Labrador (Oke) 🔨 | 1 | 0 | 1 | 0 | 1 | 0 | 2 | 0 | 1 | 0 | 2 | 8 |

| Sheet D | 1 | 2 | 3 | 4 | 5 | 6 | 7 | 8 | 9 | 10 | Final |
|---|---|---|---|---|---|---|---|---|---|---|---|
| Yukon/Northwest Territories (Hilderman) | 0 | 1 | 0 | 1 | 0 | 0 | 2 | 0 | 2 | 2 | 8 |
| New Brunswick (MacDiarmid) 🔨 | 1 | 0 | 0 | 0 | 2 | 1 | 0 | 5 | 0 | 0 | 9 |

| Sheet E | 1 | 2 | 3 | 4 | 5 | 6 | 7 | 8 | 9 | 10 | Final |
|---|---|---|---|---|---|---|---|---|---|---|---|
| Ontario (Parry) 🔨 | 0 | 2 | 1 | 4 | 0 | 0 | 0 | 3 | X | X | 10 |
| Alberta (Johnson) | 0 | 0 | 0 | 0 | 1 | 2 | 1 | 0 | X | X | 4 |

==== Draw 16 ====
| Sheet A | 1 | 2 | 3 | 4 | 5 | 6 | 7 | 8 | 9 | 10 | Final |
|---|---|---|---|---|---|---|---|---|---|---|---|
| Ontario (Parry) | 0 | 1 | 1 | 0 | 2 | 0 | 1 | 0 | 2 | 2 | 9 |
| British Columbia (Craig) 🔨 | 1 | 0 | 0 | 2 | 0 | 2 | 0 | 2 | 0 | 0 | 7 |

| Sheet B | 1 | 2 | 3 | 4 | 5 | 6 | 7 | 8 | 9 | 10 | Final |
|---|---|---|---|---|---|---|---|---|---|---|---|
| Quebec (Charette) 🔨 | 0 | 0 | 1 | 0 | 2 | 0 | 2 | 0 | 1 | 0 | 6 |
| Yukon/Northwest Territories (Hilderman) | 1 | 2 | 0 | 2 | 0 | 2 | 0 | 1 | 0 | 1 | 9 |

| Sheet C | 1 | 2 | 3 | 4 | 5 | 6 | 7 | 8 | 9 | 10 | Final |
|---|---|---|---|---|---|---|---|---|---|---|---|
| Prince Edward Island (MacDonald) | 1 | 0 | 0 | 2 | 0 | 2 | 0 | 0 | 4 | 0 | 9 |
| New Brunswick (MacDiarmid) 🔨 | 0 | 2 | 1 | 0 | 1 | 0 | 0 | 1 | 0 | 0 | 5 |

| Sheet D | 1 | 2 | 3 | 4 | 5 | 6 | 7 | 8 | 9 | 10 | Final |
|---|---|---|---|---|---|---|---|---|---|---|---|
| Nova Scotia (Rafuse) 🔨 | 2 | 1 | 0 | 1 | 0 | 1 | 0 | 1 | 0 | 1 | 7 |
| Saskatchewan (Heidt) | 0 | 0 | 2 | 0 | 1 | 0 | 1 | 0 | 2 | 0 | 6 |

| Sheet E | 1 | 2 | 3 | 4 | 5 | 6 | 7 | 8 | 9 | 10 | Final |
|---|---|---|---|---|---|---|---|---|---|---|---|
| Newfoundland and Labrador (Oke) | 0 | 0 | 1 | 0 | 2 | 0 | 2 | 0 | 1 | 0 | 6 |
| Northern Ontario (Hackner) 🔨 | 2 | 0 | 0 | 2 | 0 | 1 | 0 | 1 | 0 | 1 | 7 |

| Sheet F | 1 | 2 | 3 | 4 | 5 | 6 | 7 | 8 | 9 | 10 | Final |
|---|---|---|---|---|---|---|---|---|---|---|---|
| Alberta (Johnson) 🔨 | 1 | 0 | 0 | 1 | 0 | 2 | 1 | 1 | 0 | 0 | 6 |
| Manitoba (Ramage) | 0 | 1 | 0 | 0 | 1 | 0 | 0 | 0 | 1 | 0 | 3 |

==== Draw 18 ====
| Sheet A | 1 | 2 | 3 | 4 | 5 | 6 | 7 | 8 | 9 | 10 | Final |
|---|---|---|---|---|---|---|---|---|---|---|---|
| Northern Ontario (Hackner) | 0 | 0 | 2 | 0 | 0 | 0 | 0 | 2 | 0 | 3 | 7 |
| Yukon/Northwest Territories (Hilderman) 🔨 | 0 | 2 | 0 | 0 | 0 | 0 | 2 | 0 | 1 | 0 | 5 |

| Sheet B | 1 | 2 | 3 | 4 | 5 | 6 | 7 | 8 | 9 | 10 | Final |
|---|---|---|---|---|---|---|---|---|---|---|---|
| Ontario (Parry) 🔨 | 4 | 0 | 1 | 0 | 2 | 0 | 2 | 0 | 0 | X | 9 |
| Saskatchewan (Heidt) | 0 | 1 | 0 | 1 | 0 | 2 | 0 | 0 | 0 | X | 4 |

| Sheet C | 1 | 2 | 3 | 4 | 5 | 6 | 7 | 8 | 9 | 10 | Final |
|---|---|---|---|---|---|---|---|---|---|---|---|
| British Columbia (Craig) | 0 | 1 | 0 | 2 | 0 | 0 | 1 | 0 | 1 | 0 | 5 |
| Alberta (Johnson) 🔨 | 2 | 0 | 1 | 0 | 1 | 1 | 0 | 1 | 0 | 1 | 7 |

| Sheet D | 1 | 2 | 3 | 4 | 5 | 6 | 7 | 8 | 9 | 10 | Final |
|---|---|---|---|---|---|---|---|---|---|---|---|
| Newfoundland and Labrador (Oke) 🔨 | 1 | 0 | 1 | 0 | 0 | 1 | 0 | 0 | X | X | 3 |
| Manitoba (Ramage) | 0 | 2 | 0 | 2 | 2 | 0 | 1 | 1 | X | X | 8 |

| Sheet E | 1 | 2 | 3 | 4 | 5 | 6 | 7 | 8 | 9 | 10 | Final |
|---|---|---|---|---|---|---|---|---|---|---|---|
| Prince Edward Island (MacDonald) | 0 | 0 | 2 | 0 | 2 | 0 | 1 | 1 | 1 | 0 | 7 |
| Nova Scotia (Rafuse) 🔨 | 3 | 1 | 0 | 2 | 0 | 1 | 0 | 0 | 0 | 1 | 8 |

| Sheet F | 1 | 2 | 3 | 4 | 5 | 6 | 7 | 8 | 9 | 10 | Final |
|---|---|---|---|---|---|---|---|---|---|---|---|
| New Brunswick (MacDiarmid) | 0 | 2 | 0 | 0 | 0 | 0 | 1 | 0 | X | X | 3 |
| Quebec (Charette) 🔨 | 1 | 0 | 1 | 1 | 1 | 2 | 0 | 4 | X | X | 10 |

==== Draw 20 ====
| Sheet A | 1 | 2 | 3 | 4 | 5 | 6 | 7 | 8 | 9 | 10 | Final |
|---|---|---|---|---|---|---|---|---|---|---|---|
| Saskatchewan (Heidt) 🔨 | 3 | 0 | 1 | 0 | 1 | 0 | 2 | 1 | 0 | X | 8 |
| Alberta (Johnson) | 0 | 1 | 0 | 1 | 0 | 1 | 0 | 0 | 1 | X | 4 |

| Sheet B | 1 | 2 | 3 | 4 | 5 | 6 | 7 | 8 | 9 | 10 | Final |
|---|---|---|---|---|---|---|---|---|---|---|---|
| New Brunswick (MacDiarmid) | 0 | 2 | 0 | 1 | 0 | 2 | 0 | 1 | 0 | 0 | 6 |
| Northern Ontario (Hackner) 🔨 | 1 | 0 | 2 | 0 | 1 | 0 | 3 | 0 | 0 | 1 | 8 |

| Sheet C | 1 | 2 | 3 | 4 | 5 | 6 | 7 | 8 | 9 | 10 | 11 | Final |
|---|---|---|---|---|---|---|---|---|---|---|---|---|
| Yukon/Northwest Territories (Hilderman) 🔨 | 2 | 0 | 0 | 1 | 0 | 1 | 0 | 1 | 0 | 1 | 0 | 6 |
| Manitoba (Ramage) | 0 | 0 | 1 | 0 | 1 | 0 | 2 | 0 | 2 | 0 | 1 | 7 |

| Sheet D | 1 | 2 | 3 | 4 | 5 | 6 | 7 | 8 | 9 | 10 | Final |
|---|---|---|---|---|---|---|---|---|---|---|---|
| Quebec (Charette) 🔨 | 3 | 0 | 0 | 0 | 2 | 1 | 0 | 0 | 0 | X | 6 |
| Nova Scotia (Rafuse) | 0 | 0 | 3 | 0 | 0 | 0 | 4 | 1 | 2 | X | 10 |

| Sheet E | 1 | 2 | 3 | 4 | 5 | 6 | 7 | 8 | 9 | 10 | Final |
|---|---|---|---|---|---|---|---|---|---|---|---|
| British Columbia (Craig) | 0 | 1 | 0 | 1 | 0 | 2 | 0 | 0 | 2 | 2 | 8 |
| Newfoundland and Labrador (Oke) 🔨 | 0 | 0 | 2 | 0 | 2 | 0 | 0 | 1 | 0 | 0 | 5 |

| Sheet F | 1 | 2 | 3 | 4 | 5 | 6 | 7 | 8 | 9 | 10 | 11 | Final |
|---|---|---|---|---|---|---|---|---|---|---|---|---|
| Prince Edward Island (MacDonald) | 1 | 2 | 1 | 0 | 2 | 0 | 2 | 0 | 2 | 0 | 0 | 10 |
| Ontario (Parry) 🔨 | 0 | 0 | 0 | 3 | 0 | 2 | 0 | 3 | 0 | 2 | 2 | 12 |

==== Draw 22 ====
| Sheet A | 1 | 2 | 3 | 4 | 5 | 6 | 7 | 8 | 9 | 10 | Final |
|---|---|---|---|---|---|---|---|---|---|---|---|
| Manitoba (Ramage) 🔨 | 1 | 2 | 0 | 1 | 0 | 2 | 0 | 2 | 0 | 1 | 9 |
| Nova Scotia (Rafuse) | 0 | 0 | 1 | 0 | 2 | 0 | 2 | 0 | 1 | 0 | 6 |

| Sheet B | 1 | 2 | 3 | 4 | 5 | 6 | 7 | 8 | 9 | 10 | Final |
|---|---|---|---|---|---|---|---|---|---|---|---|
| Prince Edward Island (MacDonald) 🔨 | 4 | 0 | 1 | 0 | 1 | 1 | 0 | 0 | 0 | 2 | 9 |
| Newfoundland and Labrador (Oke) | 0 | 2 | 0 | 2 | 0 | 0 | 2 | 2 | 0 | 0 | 8 |

| Sheet C | 1 | 2 | 3 | 4 | 5 | 6 | 7 | 8 | 9 | 10 | Final |
|---|---|---|---|---|---|---|---|---|---|---|---|
| Ontario (Parry) 🔨 | 2 | 0 | 2 | 0 | 2 | 0 | 3 | 1 | X | X | 10 |
| Quebec (Charette) | 0 | 1 | 0 | 2 | 0 | 1 | 0 | 0 | X | X | 4 |

| Sheet D | 1 | 2 | 3 | 4 | 5 | 6 | 7 | 8 | 9 | 10 | Final |
|---|---|---|---|---|---|---|---|---|---|---|---|
| Northern Ontario (Hackner) | 0 | 1 | 0 | 0 | 0 | 1 | 0 | X | X | X | 2 |
| Alberta (Johnson) 🔨 | 2 | 0 | 2 | 1 | 2 | 0 | 3 | X | X | X | 10 |

| Sheet E | 1 | 2 | 3 | 4 | 5 | 6 | 7 | 8 | 9 | 10 | Final |
|---|---|---|---|---|---|---|---|---|---|---|---|
| New Brunswick (MacDiarmid) | 0 | 1 | 0 | 1 | 0 | 1 | 0 | X | X | X | 3 |
| Saskatchewan (Heidt) 🔨 | 3 | 0 | 3 | 0 | 2 | 0 | 3 | X | X | X | 11 |

| Sheet F | 1 | 2 | 3 | 4 | 5 | 6 | 7 | 8 | 9 | 10 | Final |
|---|---|---|---|---|---|---|---|---|---|---|---|
| Yukon/Northwest Territories (Hilderman) | 1 | 0 | 2 | 1 | 0 | 0 | 3 | 2 | 0 | 0 | 9 |
| British Columbia (Craig) 🔨 | 0 | 2 | 0 | 0 | 2 | 2 | 0 | 0 | 1 | 1 | 8 |

=== Playoffs ===
| Semi final | | Final |
| Saskatchewan | 3 |
| Alberta | 8 | Ontario | 4 |
| | | Alberta | 7 |

==== Semifinal ====
| Sheet D | 1 | 2 | 3 | 4 | 5 | 6 | 7 | 8 | 9 | 10 | Final |
|---|---|---|---|---|---|---|---|---|---|---|---|
| Saskatchewan (Heidt) 🔨 | 0 | 1 | 0 | 1 | 0 | 1 | 0 | 0 | 0 | X | 3 |
| Alberta (Johnson) | 1 | 0 | 2 | 0 | 1 | 0 | 2 | 2 | 0 | X | 8 |

Player percentages
| Saskatchewan | | Alberta | |
|---|---|---|---|
| Dale Hannon | 89% | Millard Evans | 72% |
| Dan Ormsby | 85% | Ken McLean | 92% |
| Gerald Shymko | 60% | Marv Wirth | 84% |
| Brad Heidt | 58% | Mark Johnson | 97% |
| Total | 74% | Total | 86% |

==== Final ====
| Sheet C | 1 | 2 | 3 | 4 | 5 | 6 | 7 | 8 | 9 | 10 | Final |
|---|---|---|---|---|---|---|---|---|---|---|---|
| Ontario (Parry) 🔨 | 1 | 0 | 2 | 0 | 0 | 1 | 0 | 0 | 0 | 0 | 4 |
| Alberta (Johnson) | 0 | 3 | 0 | 0 | 1 | 0 | 1 | 0 | 1 | 1 | 7 |

Player percentages
| Ontario | | Alberta | |
|---|---|---|---|
| Ken Armstrong | 80% | Millard Evans | 85% |
| Len Rominger | 91% | Ken McLean | 81% |
| Frank McCourt | 73% | Marv Wirth | 88% |
| Gareth Parry | 64% | Mark Johnson | 93% |
| Total | 77% | Total | 87% |

== Women's teams ==
| Team | Skip | Third | Second | Lead | Club |
|---|---|---|---|---|---|
| Alberta | Diane Foster | Karen Morrison | Barb McDonald | Louise Sheeran | Calgary WC, Calgary |
| British Columbia | Christine Jurgenson | Cheryl Noble | Pat Sanders | Roselyn Craig | Juan de Fuca CC, Victoria |
| Manitoba | Linda Vandaele | Betty Couling | Sharon Shannon | Liliane Fargey | Brandon CC, Brandon |
| New Brunswick | Heidi Hanlon | Kathy Floyd | Sue Dobson | Jane Arsenau | Thistle St. Andrew's CC, Saint John |
| Newfoundland and Labrador | Laura Philips | Diane Ryan | Marian Dawe | Jeanette Hodder | Remax Centre, St. John's |
| Northern Ontario | Vicky Barrett | Margaret McLaughlin | Lois Henderson-Campbell | Brenda Harrow | Sudbury CC, Sudbury |
| Nova Scotia | Jocelyn Nix | Andrea Saulnier | Jill Alcoe-Holland | Julie Morley | Glooscap CC, Kentville |
| Ontario | Dale Curtis | Twyla Gilbert | Rosemary Gowman | Vicki Marianchuk | Brampton CC, Brampton |
| Prince Edward Island | Shirley Berry | Sandy Hope | Shelley Ebbett | Arleen Harris | Cornwall CC, Cornwall & Charlottetown CC, Charlottetown |
| Quebec | Agnès Charette | France Charette | Guylaine Deschâtelets | Marie Leblanc | Buckingham CC, Buckingham |
| Saskatchewan | Susan Lang | Linda Burnham | Donna Ell | Pat Bell | Callie CC, Saskatoon |
| Northwest Territories/Yukon | Ann McKellar-Gillis | Terry Fisher | Marie Coe | Louise Marcinkoski | Yellowknife CC, Yellowknife |

=== Standings ===
| Province | W | L |
|---|---|---|
| British Columbia | 9 | 2 |
| Northern Ontario | 8 | 3 |
| New Brunswick | 7 | 4 |
| Saskatchewan | 7 | 4 |
| Ontario | 6 | 5 |
| Alberta | 5 | 6 |
| Nova Scotia | 5 | 6 |
| Manitoba | 5 | 6 |
| Newfoundland and Labrador | 4 | 7 |
| Quebec | 4 | 7 |
| Prince Edward Island | 3 | 8 |
| Northwest Territories/Yukon | 3 | 8 |

=== Results ===
==== Draw 1 ====
| Sheet A | 1 | 2 | 3 | 4 | 5 | 6 | 7 | 8 | 9 | 10 | Final |
|---|---|---|---|---|---|---|---|---|---|---|---|
| Newfoundland and Labrador (Phillips) | 2 | 0 | 2 | 0 | 2 | 0 | 0 | 1 | 1 | X | 8 |
| Quebec (Charette) 🔨 | 0 | 1 | 0 | 1 | 0 | 1 | 1 | 0 | 0 | X | 4 |

| Sheet B | 1 | 2 | 3 | 4 | 5 | 6 | 7 | 8 | 9 | 10 | Final |
|---|---|---|---|---|---|---|---|---|---|---|---|
| Alberta (Foster) 🔨 | 3 | 2 | 1 | 1 | 1 | 0 | 1 | 0 | 0 | X | 9 |
| Prince Edward Island (Berry) | 0 | 0 | 0 | 0 | 0 | 2 | 0 | 2 | 1 | X | 5 |

| Sheet C | 1 | 2 | 3 | 4 | 5 | 6 | 7 | 8 | 9 | 10 | 11 | Final |
|---|---|---|---|---|---|---|---|---|---|---|---|---|
| Nova Scotia (Nix) | 0 | 2 | 0 | 0 | 3 | 0 | 1 | 0 | 1 | 0 | 1 | 8 |
| Northern Ontario (Barrett) 🔨 | 1 | 0 | 1 | 1 | 0 | 1 | 0 | 2 | 0 | 1 | 0 | 7 |

| Sheet D | 1 | 2 | 3 | 4 | 5 | 6 | 7 | 8 | 9 | 10 | Final |
|---|---|---|---|---|---|---|---|---|---|---|---|
| New Brunswick (Hanlon) | 0 | 4 | 0 | 2 | 2 | 1 | 2 | X | X | X | 11 |
| British Columbia (Jurgenson) 🔨 | 1 | 0 | 2 | 0 | 0 | 0 | 0 | X | X | X | 3 |

| Sheet E | 1 | 2 | 3 | 4 | 5 | 6 | 7 | 8 | 9 | 10 | Final |
|---|---|---|---|---|---|---|---|---|---|---|---|
| Manitoba (Van Daele) 🔨 | 0 | 2 | 0 | 1 | 0 | 2 | 0 | 1 | 0 | 2 | 8 |
| Ontario (Curtis) | 0 | 0 | 2 | 0 | 2 | 0 | 2 | 0 | 1 | 0 | 7 |

| Sheet F | 1 | 2 | 3 | 4 | 5 | 6 | 7 | 8 | 9 | 10 | Final |
|---|---|---|---|---|---|---|---|---|---|---|---|
| Saskatchewan (Lang) 🔨 | 1 | 3 | 1 | 1 | 0 | 2 | 1 | 0 | X | X | 9 |
| Northwest Territories/Yukon (McKellar-Gillis) | 0 | 0 | 0 | 0 | 1 | 0 | 0 | 1 | X | X | 2 |

==== Draw 3 ====
| Sheet A | 1 | 2 | 3 | 4 | 5 | 6 | 7 | 8 | 9 | 10 | Final |
|---|---|---|---|---|---|---|---|---|---|---|---|
| New Brunswick (Hanlon) 🔨 | 0 | 2 | 0 | 2 | 2 | 0 | 2 | 1 | X | X | 9 |
| Manitoba (Van Daele) | 0 | 0 | 1 | 0 | 0 | 2 | 0 | 0 | X | X | 3 |

| Sheet B | 1 | 2 | 3 | 4 | 5 | 6 | 7 | 8 | 9 | 10 | Final |
|---|---|---|---|---|---|---|---|---|---|---|---|
| British Columbia (Jurgenson) | 1 | 0 | 1 | 0 | 2 | 1 | 1 | 2 | X | X | 8 |
| Nova Scotia (Nix) 🔨 | 0 | 1 | 0 | 1 | 0 | 0 | 0 | 0 | X | X | 2 |

| Sheet C | 1 | 2 | 3 | 4 | 5 | 6 | 7 | 8 | 9 | 10 | Final |
|---|---|---|---|---|---|---|---|---|---|---|---|
| Saskatchewan (Lang) | 0 | 1 | 0 | 0 | 2 | 1 | 0 | 0 | 2 | 0 | 6 |
| Newfoundland and Labrador (Phillips) 🔨 | 1 | 0 | 1 | 1 | 0 | 0 | 0 | 1 | 0 | 1 | 5 |

| Sheet D | 1 | 2 | 3 | 4 | 5 | 6 | 7 | 8 | 9 | 10 | Final |
|---|---|---|---|---|---|---|---|---|---|---|---|
| Prince Edward Island (Berry) 🔨 | 0 | 1 | 0 | 1 | 0 | 1 | 0 | 2 | 0 | 2 | 7 |
| Northwest Territories/Yukon (McKellar-Gillis) | 0 | 0 | 1 | 0 | 2 | 0 | 2 | 0 | 1 | 0 | 6 |

| Sheet E | 1 | 2 | 3 | 4 | 5 | 6 | 7 | 8 | 9 | 10 | Final |
|---|---|---|---|---|---|---|---|---|---|---|---|
| Alberta (Foster) | 2 | 0 | 1 | 1 | 0 | 3 | 1 | X | X | X | 8 |
| Quebec (Charette) 🔨 | 0 | 1 | 0 | 0 | 1 | 0 | 0 | X | X | X | 2 |

| Sheet F | 1 | 2 | 3 | 4 | 5 | 6 | 7 | 8 | 9 | 10 | Final |
|---|---|---|---|---|---|---|---|---|---|---|---|
| Northern Ontario (Barrett) 🔨 | 2 | 1 | 0 | 0 | 4 | 0 | 1 | 0 | 4 | X | 12 |
| Ontario (Curtis) | 0 | 0 | 3 | 0 | 0 | 1 | 0 | 1 | 0 | X | 5 |

==== Draw 5 ====
| Sheet C | 1 | 2 | 3 | 4 | 5 | 6 | 7 | 8 | 9 | 10 | Final |
|---|---|---|---|---|---|---|---|---|---|---|---|
| New Brunswick (Hanlon) 🔨 | 0 | 0 | 1 | 0 | 1 | 1 | 2 | 2 | 1 | X | 8 |
| Ontario (Curtis) | 0 | 1 | 0 | 1 | 0 | 0 | 0 | 0 | 0 | X | 2 |

| Sheet E | 1 | 2 | 3 | 4 | 5 | 6 | 7 | 8 | 9 | 10 | 11 | Final |
|---|---|---|---|---|---|---|---|---|---|---|---|---|
| Nova Scotia (Nix) | 0 | 1 | 0 | 0 | 4 | 0 | 1 | 0 | 1 | 1 | 0 | 8 |
| Northwest Territories/Yukon (McKellar-Gillis) 🔨 | 1 | 0 | 2 | 1 | 0 | 3 | 0 | 1 | 0 | 0 | 1 | 9 |

| Sheet F | 1 | 2 | 3 | 4 | 5 | 6 | 7 | 8 | 9 | 10 | Final |
|---|---|---|---|---|---|---|---|---|---|---|---|
| Newfoundland and Labrador (Philips) | 0 | 0 | 1 | 2 | 1 | 1 | 0 | 3 | 0 | X | 8 |
| Alberta (Foster) 🔨 | 0 | 1 | 0 | 0 | 0 | 0 | 2 | 0 | 1 | X | 4 |

==== Draw 6 ====
| Sheet A | 1 | 2 | 3 | 4 | 5 | 6 | 7 | 8 | 9 | 10 | Final |
|---|---|---|---|---|---|---|---|---|---|---|---|
| British Columbia (Jurgenson) | 0 | 2 | 0 | 2 | 0 | 1 | 0 | 1 | 0 | 1 | 7 |
| Prince Edward Island (Berry) 🔨 | 0 | 0 | 2 | 0 | 1 | 0 | 1 | 0 | 1 | 0 | 6 |

| Sheet B | 1 | 2 | 3 | 4 | 5 | 6 | 7 | 8 | 9 | 10 | Final |
|---|---|---|---|---|---|---|---|---|---|---|---|
| Saskatchewan (Lang) | 1 | 0 | 0 | 1 | 1 | 0 | 2 | 1 | 0 | 2 | 8 |
| Quebec (Charette) 🔨 | 0 | 2 | 1 | 0 | 0 | 1 | 0 | 0 | 2 | 0 | 6 |

| Sheet D | 1 | 2 | 3 | 4 | 5 | 6 | 7 | 8 | 9 | 10 | Final |
|---|---|---|---|---|---|---|---|---|---|---|---|
| Manitoba (Van Daele) | 1 | 0 | 0 | 0 | 1 | 0 | 0 | 1 | 0 | X | 3 |
| Northern Ontario (Barrett) 🔨 | 0 | 1 | 1 | 1 | 0 | 1 | 1 | 0 | 1 | X | 6 |

==== Draw 7 ====
| Sheet B | 1 | 2 | 3 | 4 | 5 | 6 | 7 | 8 | 9 | 10 | Final |
|---|---|---|---|---|---|---|---|---|---|---|---|
| Northwest Territories/Yukon (McKellar-Gillis) 🔨 | 1 | 2 | 0 | 0 | 1 | 2 | 0 | 1 | 0 | 2 | 9 |
| Alberta (Foster) | 0 | 0 | 1 | 1 | 0 | 0 | 4 | 0 | 1 | 0 | 7 |

| Sheet D | 1 | 2 | 3 | 4 | 5 | 6 | 7 | 8 | 9 | 10 | Final |
|---|---|---|---|---|---|---|---|---|---|---|---|
| Ontario (Curtis) 🔨 | 2 | 0 | 2 | 4 | 0 | 0 | 1 | 0 | X | X | 9 |
| Newfoundland and Labrador (Philips) | 0 | 1 | 0 | 0 | 1 | 1 | 0 | 1 | X | X | 4 |

| Sheet F | 1 | 2 | 3 | 4 | 5 | 6 | 7 | 8 | 9 | 10 | Final |
|---|---|---|---|---|---|---|---|---|---|---|---|
| Nova Scotia (Nix) 🔨 | 2 | 0 | 1 | 0 | 2 | 1 | 0 | 0 | 1 | 0 | 7 |
| New Brunswick (Hanlon) | 0 | 1 | 0 | 1 | 0 | 0 | 3 | 2 | 0 | 1 | 8 |

==== Draw 8 ====
| Sheet A | 1 | 2 | 3 | 4 | 5 | 6 | 7 | 8 | 9 | 10 | Final |
|---|---|---|---|---|---|---|---|---|---|---|---|
| Quebec (Charette) 🔨 | 2 | 0 | 0 | 1 | 0 | 1 | 0 | 0 | 2 | 0 | 6 |
| Northern Ontario (Barrett) | 0 | 0 | 0 | 0 | 1 | 0 | 1 | 2 | 0 | 0 | 4 |

| Sheet C | 1 | 2 | 3 | 4 | 5 | 6 | 7 | 8 | 9 | 10 | Final |
|---|---|---|---|---|---|---|---|---|---|---|---|
| Manitoba (Van Daele) | 4 | 2 | 0 | 3 | 0 | 3 | X | X | X | X | 12 |
| Prince Edward Island (Berry) 🔨 | 0 | 0 | 2 | 0 | 3 | 0 | X | X | X | X | 5 |

| Sheet E | 1 | 2 | 3 | 4 | 5 | 6 | 7 | 8 | 9 | 10 | Final |
|---|---|---|---|---|---|---|---|---|---|---|---|
| Saskatchewan (Lang) | 1 | 0 | 1 | 0 | 1 | 0 | 1 | 0 | 1 | 1 | 6 |
| British Columbia (Jurgenson) 🔨 | 0 | 1 | 0 | 2 | 0 | 1 | 0 | 1 | 0 | 0 | 5 |

==== Draw 9 ====
| Sheet A | 1 | 2 | 3 | 4 | 5 | 6 | 7 | 8 | 9 | 10 | Final |
|---|---|---|---|---|---|---|---|---|---|---|---|
| Northwest Territories/Yukon (McKellar-Gillis) | 0 | 2 | 0 | 0 | 0 | 0 | X | X | X | X | 2 |
| Ontario (Curtis) 🔨 | 3 | 0 | 2 | 1 | 3 | 1 | X | X | X | X | 10 |

| Sheet B | 1 | 2 | 3 | 4 | 5 | 6 | 7 | 8 | 9 | 10 | Final |
|---|---|---|---|---|---|---|---|---|---|---|---|
| Newfoundland and Labrador (Philips) 🔨 | 1 | 0 | 1 | 1 | 1 | 0 | 0 | 0 | 4 | X | 8 |
| New Brunswick (Hanlon) | 0 | 1 | 0 | 0 | 0 | 1 | 1 | 1 | 0 | X | 4 |

| Sheet C | 1 | 2 | 3 | 4 | 5 | 6 | 7 | 8 | 9 | 10 | Final |
|---|---|---|---|---|---|---|---|---|---|---|---|
| Alberta (Foster) | 0 | 2 | 0 | 0 | 1 | 2 | 0 | 2 | 0 | 0 | 7 |
| Nova Scotia (Nix) 🔨 | 1 | 0 | 0 | 1 | 0 | 0 | 1 | 0 | 1 | 2 | 6 |

==== Draw 10 ====
| Sheet D | 1 | 2 | 3 | 4 | 5 | 6 | 7 | 8 | 9 | 10 | Final |
|---|---|---|---|---|---|---|---|---|---|---|---|
| British Columbia (Jurgenson) | 1 | 0 | 1 | 0 | 0 | 2 | 2 | 0 | 2 | X | 8 |
| Quebec (Charette) 🔨 | 0 | 1 | 0 | 1 | 1 | 0 | 0 | 2 | 0 | X | 5 |

| Sheet E | 1 | 2 | 3 | 4 | 5 | 6 | 7 | 8 | 9 | 10 | 11 | Final |
|---|---|---|---|---|---|---|---|---|---|---|---|---|
| Northern Ontario (Barrett) 🔨 | 3 | 0 | 2 | 0 | 0 | 1 | 0 | 3 | 0 | 0 | 1 | 10 |
| Prince Edward Island (Berry) | 0 | 1 | 0 | 2 | 1 | 0 | 2 | 0 | 2 | 1 | 0 | 9 |

| Sheet F | 1 | 2 | 3 | 4 | 5 | 6 | 7 | 8 | 9 | 10 | Final |
|---|---|---|---|---|---|---|---|---|---|---|---|
| Manitoba (Van Daele) 🔨 | 1 | 0 | 0 | 0 | 2 | 0 | 1 | 0 | 2 | 0 | 6 |
| Saskatchewan (Lang) | 0 | 2 | 0 | 1 | 0 | 1 | 0 | 2 | 0 | 1 | 7 |

==== Draw 11 ====
| Sheet A | 1 | 2 | 3 | 4 | 5 | 6 | 7 | 8 | 9 | 10 | 11 | Final |
|---|---|---|---|---|---|---|---|---|---|---|---|---|
| Alberta (Foster) | 0 | 2 | 0 | 1 | 0 | 0 | 2 | 1 | 0 | 0 | 1 | 7 |
| New Brunswick (Hanlon) 🔨 | 1 | 0 | 1 | 0 | 1 | 1 | 0 | 0 | 1 | 1 | 0 | 6 |

| Sheet B | 1 | 2 | 3 | 4 | 5 | 6 | 7 | 8 | 9 | 10 | Final |
|---|---|---|---|---|---|---|---|---|---|---|---|
| Nova Scotia (Nix) 🔨 | 0 | 1 | 0 | 1 | 0 | 2 | 0 | 0 | 1 | 0 | 5 |
| Ontario (Curtis) | 1 | 0 | 2 | 0 | 1 | 0 | 0 | 1 | 0 | 1 | 6 |

| Sheet C | 1 | 2 | 3 | 4 | 5 | 6 | 7 | 8 | 9 | 10 | Final |
|---|---|---|---|---|---|---|---|---|---|---|---|
| Newfoundland and Labrador (Philips) 🔨 | 2 | 0 | 0 | 3 | 3 | 0 | 1 | 1 | X | X | 10 |
| Northwest Territories/Yukon (McKellar-Gillis) | 0 | 0 | 2 | 0 | 0 | 1 | 0 | 0 | X | X | 3 |

==== Draw 12 ====
| Sheet D | 1 | 2 | 3 | 4 | 5 | 6 | 7 | 8 | 9 | 10 | Final |
|---|---|---|---|---|---|---|---|---|---|---|---|
| Saskatchewan (Lang) | 0 | 0 | 0 | 0 | 1 | 0 | 2 | 0 | 2 | 0 | 5 |
| Prince Edward Island (Berry) 🔨 | 0 | 1 | 0 | 1 | 0 | 2 | 0 | 1 | 0 | 1 | 6 |

| Sheet E | 1 | 2 | 3 | 4 | 5 | 6 | 7 | 8 | 9 | 10 | Final |
|---|---|---|---|---|---|---|---|---|---|---|---|
| Quebec (Charette) | 1 | 0 | 3 | 0 | 1 | 0 | 0 | 1 | 0 | 1 | 7 |
| Manitoba (Van Daele) 🔨 | 0 | 1 | 0 | 1 | 0 | 2 | 3 | 0 | 2 | 0 | 9 |

| Sheet F | 1 | 2 | 3 | 4 | 5 | 6 | 7 | 8 | 9 | 10 | 11 | Final |
|---|---|---|---|---|---|---|---|---|---|---|---|---|
| British Columbia (Jurgenson) 🔨 | 1 | 0 | 1 | 0 | 3 | 1 | 0 | 0 | 0 | 0 | 1 | 7 |
| Northern Ontario (Barrett) | 0 | 1 | 0 | 1 | 0 | 0 | 1 | 1 | 1 | 1 | 0 | 6 |

==== Draw 13 ====
| Sheet A | 1 | 2 | 3 | 4 | 5 | 6 | 7 | 8 | 9 | 10 | Final |
|---|---|---|---|---|---|---|---|---|---|---|---|
| Nova Scotia (Nix) 🔨 | 1 | 1 | 0 | 2 | 1 | 0 | 0 | 2 | 0 | X | 7 |
| Newfoundland and Labrador (Philips) | 0 | 0 | 1 | 0 | 0 | 1 | 1 | 0 | 1 | X | 4 |

| Sheet D | 1 | 2 | 3 | 4 | 5 | 6 | 7 | 8 | 9 | 10 | Final |
|---|---|---|---|---|---|---|---|---|---|---|---|
| Northwest Territories/Yukon (McKellar-Gillis) 🔨 | 0 | 2 | 1 | 0 | 1 | 0 | 1 | 1 | 0 | X | 6 |
| New Brunswick (Hanlon) | 2 | 0 | 0 | 3 | 0 | 4 | 0 | 0 | 2 | X | 11 |

| Sheet E | 1 | 2 | 3 | 4 | 5 | 6 | 7 | 8 | 9 | 10 | Final |
|---|---|---|---|---|---|---|---|---|---|---|---|
| Ontario (Curtis) 🔨 | 1 | 2 | 1 | 0 | 1 | 0 | 1 | 0 | 1 | 0 | 7 |
| Alberta (Foster) | 0 | 0 | 0 | 1 | 0 | 1 | 0 | 2 | 0 | 1 | 5 |

==== Draw 14 ====
| Sheet B | 1 | 2 | 3 | 4 | 5 | 6 | 7 | 8 | 9 | 10 | Final |
|---|---|---|---|---|---|---|---|---|---|---|---|
| Manitoba (Van Daele) | 0 | 1 | 0 | 0 | 1 | 0 | 3 | 0 | 0 | X | 5 |
| British Columbia (Jurgenson) 🔨 | 3 | 0 | 2 | 1 | 0 | 1 | 0 | 1 | 2 | X | 10 |

| Sheet C | 1 | 2 | 3 | 4 | 5 | 6 | 7 | 8 | 9 | 10 | Final |
|---|---|---|---|---|---|---|---|---|---|---|---|
| Northern Ontario (Barrett) | 0 | 0 | 2 | 0 | 4 | 0 | 2 | 0 | 1 | 0 | 9 |
| Saskatchewan (Lang) 🔨 | 1 | 1 | 0 | 2 | 0 | 1 | 0 | 2 | 0 | 1 | 8 |

| Sheet F | 1 | 2 | 3 | 4 | 5 | 6 | 7 | 8 | 9 | 10 | Final |
|---|---|---|---|---|---|---|---|---|---|---|---|
| Quebec (Charette) | 1 | 1 | 0 | 2 | 0 | 2 | 0 | 1 | 2 | X | 9 |
| Prince Edward Island (Berry) 🔨 | 0 | 0 | 2 | 0 | 1 | 0 | 1 | 0 | 0 | X | 4 |

==== Draw 15 ====
| Sheet A | 1 | 2 | 3 | 4 | 5 | 6 | 7 | 8 | 9 | 10 | Final |
|---|---|---|---|---|---|---|---|---|---|---|---|
| Ontario (Curtis) | 0 | 0 | 0 | 2 | 0 | 2 | 1 | 0 | 1 | 0 | 6 |
| British Columbia (Jurgenson) 🔨 | 1 | 1 | 0 | 0 | 2 | 0 | 0 | 2 | 0 | 1 | 7 |

| Sheet B | 1 | 2 | 3 | 4 | 5 | 6 | 7 | 8 | 9 | 10 | 11 | Final |
|---|---|---|---|---|---|---|---|---|---|---|---|---|
| Quebec (Charette) | 0 | 0 | 2 | 0 | 1 | 0 | 0 | 0 | 3 | 1 | 0 | 7 |
| Northwest Territories/Yukon (McKellar-Gillis) 🔨 | 1 | 0 | 0 | 3 | 0 | 1 | 2 | 0 | 0 | 0 | 1 | 8 |

| Sheet C | 1 | 2 | 3 | 4 | 5 | 6 | 7 | 8 | 9 | 10 | Final |
|---|---|---|---|---|---|---|---|---|---|---|---|
| Prince Edward Island (Berry) 🔨 | 1 | 0 | 0 | 0 | 3 | 0 | 0 | 1 | 1 | 0 | 6 |
| New Brunswick (Hanlon) | 0 | 1 | 1 | 1 | 0 | 2 | 1 | 0 | 0 | 1 | 7 |

| Sheet D | 1 | 2 | 3 | 4 | 5 | 6 | 7 | 8 | 9 | 10 | 11 | Final |
|---|---|---|---|---|---|---|---|---|---|---|---|---|
| Nova Scotia (Nix) | 0 | 0 | 0 | 0 | 2 | 0 | 1 | 0 | 1 | 2 | 0 | 6 |
| Saskatchewan (Lang) 🔨 | 1 | 0 | 0 | 1 | 0 | 3 | 0 | 1 | 0 | 0 | 1 | 7 |

| Sheet E | 1 | 2 | 3 | 4 | 5 | 6 | 7 | 8 | 9 | 10 | Final |
|---|---|---|---|---|---|---|---|---|---|---|---|
| Newfoundland and Labrador (Philips) 🔨 | 1 | 0 | 1 | 0 | 2 | 0 | 2 | 0 | X | X | 6 |
| Northern Ontario (Barrett) | 0 | 2 | 0 | 4 | 0 | 2 | 0 | 4 | X | X | 12 |

| Sheet F | 1 | 2 | 3 | 4 | 5 | 6 | 7 | 8 | 9 | 10 | Final |
|---|---|---|---|---|---|---|---|---|---|---|---|
| Alberta (Foster) 🔨 | 1 | 1 | 0 | 1 | 3 | 0 | 1 | 0 | 1 | X | 8 |
| Manitoba (Van Daele) | 0 | 0 | 1 | 0 | 0 | 3 | 0 | 2 | 0 | X | 6 |

==== Draw 17 ====
| Sheet A | 1 | 2 | 3 | 4 | 5 | 6 | 7 | 8 | 9 | 10 | Final |
|---|---|---|---|---|---|---|---|---|---|---|---|
| Northern Ontario (Barrett) 🔨 | 0 | 1 | 0 | 2 | 0 | 1 | 0 | 6 | X | X | 10 |
| Northwest Territories/Yukon (McKellar-Gillis) | 0 | 0 | 1 | 0 | 1 | 0 | 0 | 0 | X | X | 2 |

| Sheet B | 1 | 2 | 3 | 4 | 5 | 6 | 7 | 8 | 9 | 10 | 11 | Final |
|---|---|---|---|---|---|---|---|---|---|---|---|---|
| Ontario (Curtis) 🔨 | 1 | 2 | 0 | 1 | 0 | 3 | 0 | 1 | 0 | 0 | 1 | 9 |
| Saskatchewan (Lang) | 0 | 0 | 2 | 0 | 2 | 0 | 1 | 0 | 1 | 2 | 0 | 8 |

| Sheet C | 1 | 2 | 3 | 4 | 5 | 6 | 7 | 8 | 9 | 10 | Final |
|---|---|---|---|---|---|---|---|---|---|---|---|
| British Columbia (Jurgenson) | 0 | 1 | 1 | 1 | 0 | 2 | 0 | 2 | 0 | X | 7 |
| Alberta (Foster) 🔨 | 1 | 0 | 0 | 0 | 1 | 0 | 1 | 0 | 1 | X | 4 |

| Sheet D | 1 | 2 | 3 | 4 | 5 | 6 | 7 | 8 | 9 | 10 | Final |
|---|---|---|---|---|---|---|---|---|---|---|---|
| Newfoundland and Labrador (Philips) | 0 | 1 | 0 | 1 | 0 | 0 | 1 | 0 | 0 | X | 3 |
| Manitoba (Van Daele) 🔨 | 1 | 0 | 1 | 0 | 1 | 1 | 0 | 3 | 1 | X | 8 |

| Sheet E | 1 | 2 | 3 | 4 | 5 | 6 | 7 | 8 | 9 | 10 | Final |
|---|---|---|---|---|---|---|---|---|---|---|---|
| Prince Edward Island (Berry) 🔨 | 0 | 1 | 0 | 0 | 0 | 2 | 0 | 2 | 1 | 0 | 6 |
| Nova Scotia (Nix) | 0 | 0 | 3 | 0 | 1 | 0 | 3 | 0 | 0 | 1 | 8 |

| Sheet F | 1 | 2 | 3 | 4 | 5 | 6 | 7 | 8 | 9 | 10 | Final |
|---|---|---|---|---|---|---|---|---|---|---|---|
| New Brunswick (Hanlon) | 0 | 0 | 1 | 0 | 2 | 0 | 1 | 1 | 0 | X | 5 |
| Quebec (Charette) 🔨 | 0 | 3 | 0 | 3 | 0 | 1 | 0 | 0 | 2 | X | 9 |

==== Draw 19 ====
| Sheet A | 1 | 2 | 3 | 4 | 5 | 6 | 7 | 8 | 9 | 10 | Final |
|---|---|---|---|---|---|---|---|---|---|---|---|
| Saskatchewan (Lang) | 0 | 0 | 1 | 2 | 0 | 2 | 0 | 2 | 1 | X | 8 |
| Alberta (Foster) 🔨 | 1 | 1 | 0 | 0 | 0 | 0 | 3 | 0 | 0 | X | 5 |

| Sheet B | 1 | 2 | 3 | 4 | 5 | 6 | 7 | 8 | 9 | 10 | Final |
|---|---|---|---|---|---|---|---|---|---|---|---|
| New Brunswick (Hanlon) 🔨 | 2 | 0 | 0 | 1 | 0 | 0 | 1 | 0 | 0 | X | 4 |
| Northern Ontario (Barrett) | 0 | 0 | 2 | 0 | 1 | 1 | 0 | 1 | 2 | X | 7 |

| Sheet C | 1 | 2 | 3 | 4 | 5 | 6 | 7 | 8 | 9 | 10 | Final |
|---|---|---|---|---|---|---|---|---|---|---|---|
| Northwest Territories/Yukon (McKellar-Gillis) | 1 | 0 | 0 | 1 | 0 | 2 | 0 | 2 | 1 | 0 | 7 |
| Manitoba (Van Daele) 🔨 | 0 | 1 | 0 | 0 | 2 | 0 | 2 | 0 | 0 | 3 | 8 |

| Sheet D | 1 | 2 | 3 | 4 | 5 | 6 | 7 | 8 | 9 | 10 | Final |
|---|---|---|---|---|---|---|---|---|---|---|---|
| Quebec (Charette) | 0 | 0 | 1 | 0 | 2 | 0 | 0 | 0 | X | X | 3 |
| Nova Scotia (Nix) 🔨 | 0 | 2 | 0 | 3 | 0 | 2 | 1 | 1 | X | X | 9 |

| Sheet E | 1 | 2 | 3 | 4 | 5 | 6 | 7 | 8 | 9 | 10 | 11 | Final |
|---|---|---|---|---|---|---|---|---|---|---|---|---|
| British Columbia (Jurgenson) | 0 | 1 | 0 | 1 | 0 | 1 | 0 | 1 | 0 | 1 | 3 | 8 |
| Newfoundland and Labrador (Philips) 🔨 | 1 | 0 | 1 | 0 | 1 | 0 | 1 | 0 | 1 | 0 | 0 | 5 |

| Sheet F | 1 | 2 | 3 | 4 | 5 | 6 | 7 | 8 | 9 | 10 | 11 | Final |
|---|---|---|---|---|---|---|---|---|---|---|---|---|
| Prince Edward Island (Berry) | 1 | 0 | 0 | 1 | 0 | 1 | 1 | 0 | 1 | 0 | 0 | 5 |
| Ontario (Curtis) 🔨 | 0 | 1 | 0 | 0 | 2 | 0 | 0 | 1 | 0 | 1 | 1 | 6 |

==== Draw 21 ====
| Sheet A | 1 | 2 | 3 | 4 | 5 | 6 | 7 | 8 | 9 | 10 | Final |
|---|---|---|---|---|---|---|---|---|---|---|---|
| Manitoba (Van Daele) | 0 | 1 | 0 | 0 | 1 | 0 | 1 | 0 | 1 | 1 | 5 |
| Nova Scotia (Nix) 🔨 | 0 | 0 | 0 | 2 | 0 | 1 | 0 | 3 | 0 | 0 | 6 |

| Sheet B | 1 | 2 | 3 | 4 | 5 | 6 | 7 | 8 | 9 | 10 | Final |
|---|---|---|---|---|---|---|---|---|---|---|---|
| Prince Edward Island (Berry) | 1 | 1 | 0 | 2 | 0 | 1 | 0 | 0 | 1 | 1 | 7 |
| Newfoundland and Labrador (Philips) 🔨 | 0 | 0 | 2 | 0 | 2 | 0 | 1 | 0 | 0 | 0 | 5 |

| Sheet C | 1 | 2 | 3 | 4 | 5 | 6 | 7 | 8 | 9 | 10 | Final |
|---|---|---|---|---|---|---|---|---|---|---|---|
| Ontario (Curtis) | 0 | 0 | 2 | 0 | 3 | 0 | 0 | 0 | 2 | 0 | 8 |
| Quebec (Charette) 🔨 | 1 | 2 | 0 | 1 | 0 | 0 | 2 | 1 | 0 | 2 | 9 |

| Sheet D | 1 | 2 | 3 | 4 | 5 | 6 | 7 | 8 | 9 | 10 | 11 | Final |
|---|---|---|---|---|---|---|---|---|---|---|---|---|
| Northern Ontario (Barrett) 🔨 | 2 | 0 | 1 | 0 | 0 | 1 | 0 | 0 | 2 | 0 | 2 | 8 |
| Alberta (Foster) | 0 | 1 | 0 | 0 | 1 | 0 | 1 | 1 | 0 | 2 | 0 | 6 |

| Sheet E | 1 | 2 | 3 | 4 | 5 | 6 | 7 | 8 | 9 | 10 | Final |
|---|---|---|---|---|---|---|---|---|---|---|---|
| New Brunswick (Hanlon) 🔨 | 1 | 0 | 0 | 1 | 1 | 2 | 1 | 0 | 3 | X | 9 |
| Saskatchewan (Lang) | 0 | 2 | 1 | 0 | 0 | 0 | 0 | 1 | 0 | X | 4 |

| Sheet F | 1 | 2 | 3 | 4 | 5 | 6 | 7 | 8 | 9 | 10 | Final |
|---|---|---|---|---|---|---|---|---|---|---|---|
| Northwest Territories/Yukon (McKellar-Gillis) 🔨 | 0 | 1 | 0 | 0 | 0 | 0 | 0 | X | X | X | 1 |
| British Columbia (Jurgenson) | 1 | 0 | 0 | 2 | 2 | 3 | 2 | X | X | X | 10 |

=== Playoffs ===
| Tiebreaker | | Semifinal | | Final |
| Saskatchewan | 5 |
| New Brunswick | 8 | New Brunswick | 8 |
| | | Northern Ontario | 7 |
| | | | | British Columbia | 10 |
| | | | | New Brunswick | 6 |

==== Tiebreaker ====
| Sheet D | 1 | 2 | 3 | 4 | 5 | 6 | 7 | 8 | 9 | 10 | Final |
|---|---|---|---|---|---|---|---|---|---|---|---|
| Saskatchewan (Lang) | 0 | 0 | 1 | 0 | 3 | 0 | 0 | 0 | 1 | 0 | 5 |
| New Brunswick (Hanlon) 🔨 | 2 | 1 | 0 | 1 | 0 | 2 | 0 | 1 | 0 | 1 | 8 |

Player percentages
| Saskatchewan | | New Brunswick | |
|---|---|---|---|
| Pat Bell | 88% | Jane Arseneau | 80% |
| Donna Ell | 79% | Sue Dobson | 86% |
| Linda Burnham | 68% | Kathy Floyd | 80% |
| Susan Lang | 81% | Heidi Hanlon | 86% |
| Total | 79% | Total | 83% |

==== Semifinal ====
| Sheet C | 1 | 2 | 3 | 4 | 5 | 6 | 7 | 8 | 9 | 10 | Final |
|---|---|---|---|---|---|---|---|---|---|---|---|
| New Brunswick (Hanlon) | 0 | 1 | 0 | 0 | 1 | 0 | 0 | 1 | 1 | 4 | 8 |
| Northern Ontario (Barrett) 🔨 | 1 | 0 | 2 | 2 | 0 | 1 | 1 | 0 | 0 | 0 | 7 |

Player percentages
| New Brunswick | | Northern Ontario | |
|---|---|---|---|
| Jane Arseneau | 71% | Brenda Harrow | 95% |
| Sue Dobson | 80% | Lois Henderson-Campbell | 66% |
| Kathy Floyd | 86% | Margaret McLaughlin | 91% |
| Heidi Hanlon | 74% | Vicky Barrett | 76% |
| Total | 78% | Total | 81% |

==== Final ====
| Sheet D | 1 | 2 | 3 | 4 | 5 | 6 | 7 | 8 | 9 | 10 | Final |
|---|---|---|---|---|---|---|---|---|---|---|---|
| British Columbia (Jurgenson) 🔨 | 1 | 0 | 2 | 0 | 0 | 2 | 0 | 0 | 5 | 0 | 10 |
| New Brunswick (Hanlon) | 0 | 1 | 0 | 2 | 0 | 0 | 1 | 2 | 0 | 0 | 6 |

Player percentages
| British Columbia | | New Brunswick | |
|---|---|---|---|
| Roselyn Craig | 89% | Jane Arseneau | 78% |
| Pat Sanders | 88% | Sue Dobson | 86% |
| Cheryl Noble | 91% | Kathy Floyd | 79% |
| Christine Jurgenson | 78% | Heidi Hanlon | 92% |
| Total | 87% | Total | 83% |
