= 3rd Canadian Infantry Battalion =

3rd Canadian Infantry Battalion can refer to three units of the Canadian Army Pacific Force in 1945:

- 3rd Canadian Infantry Battalion (48th Highlanders of Canada), 1st Canadian Infantry Regiment
- 3rd Canadian Infantry Battalion (The Loyal Edmonton Regiment), 2nd Canadian Infantry Regiment
- 3rd Canadian Infantry Battalion (The West Nova Scotia Regiment), 3rd Canadian Infantry Regiment
