= 219th Highland Battalion (Nova Scotia), CEF =

The 219th (Highland) Battalion, CEF was a unit in the Canadian Expeditionary Force during the First World War.

Based in Aldershot, Nova Scotia, the unit began recruiting in early 1916 as part of a four-battalion "Nova Scotia Highland Brigade". The 219th recruited personnel from the counties of Halifax, Lunenburg, Queens, Shelburne, Yarmouth, Digby, Annapolis and Kings. The 85th Battalion, the first - and senior - unit of the brigade, solicited enlistments from the entire province. Two of the 219th's 'Brigade' counterparts recruited from designated areas of the province. The 185th Battalion raised its complement of soldiers on Cape Breton Island, while the 193rd Battalion canvassed the six counties of northeastern Nova Scotia. The brigade's four battalions trained at Camp Aldershot, near Kentville, throughout the summer of 1916.

After sailing from Halifax on October 13, 1916, to England on RMS Olympic, the 219th Battalion was based at Witley Camp and later relocated to Bramshott. The battalion was absorbed into the 17th Reserve Battalion on January 23, 1917, although a number of men were transferred to the 85th around the same time. The 219th (Highland) Battalion, CEF, had one Officer Commanding, LCol W. H. Muirhead.

The battalion is perpetuated by The West Nova Scotia Regiment.

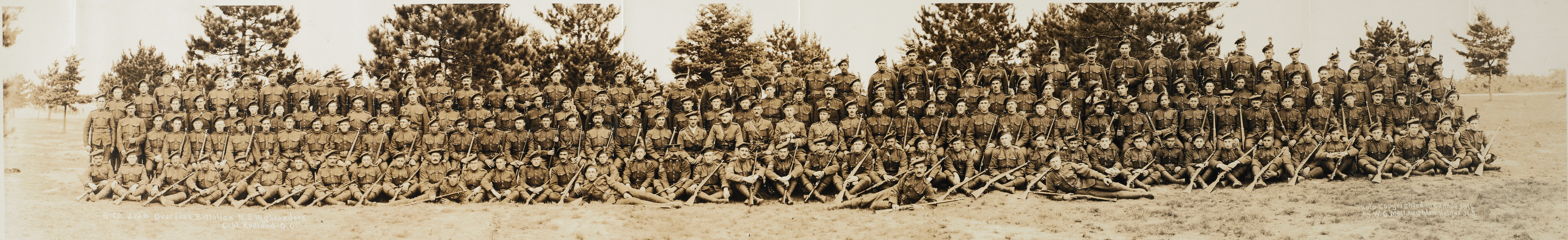
