= Marco Ferraro =

Canadian curler, broadcaster, and inventor

Marco Ferraro (1955 in Rouyn-Noranda, Quebec – August 31, 2017 in Montreal) was a Canadian curler, broadcaster and inventor from Boucherville, Quebec.

Ferraro grew up in Maple Grove, Quebec where he learned how to curl. After graduating from McGill University, he later joined the Lachine based Lawren Steventon rink, throwing second stones. The team won the 1988 Quebec men's curling championship, earning them the right to represent the province at the 1988 Labatt Brier, Canada's national men's curling championship on home ice in Chicoutimi, Quebec. At the Brier, the team finished with a 4–7 record, missing the playoffs. As it happened, Ferraro was the only French speaking curler in the tournament, and was invited by RDS to commentate games in that language. He worked for RDS until 2009.

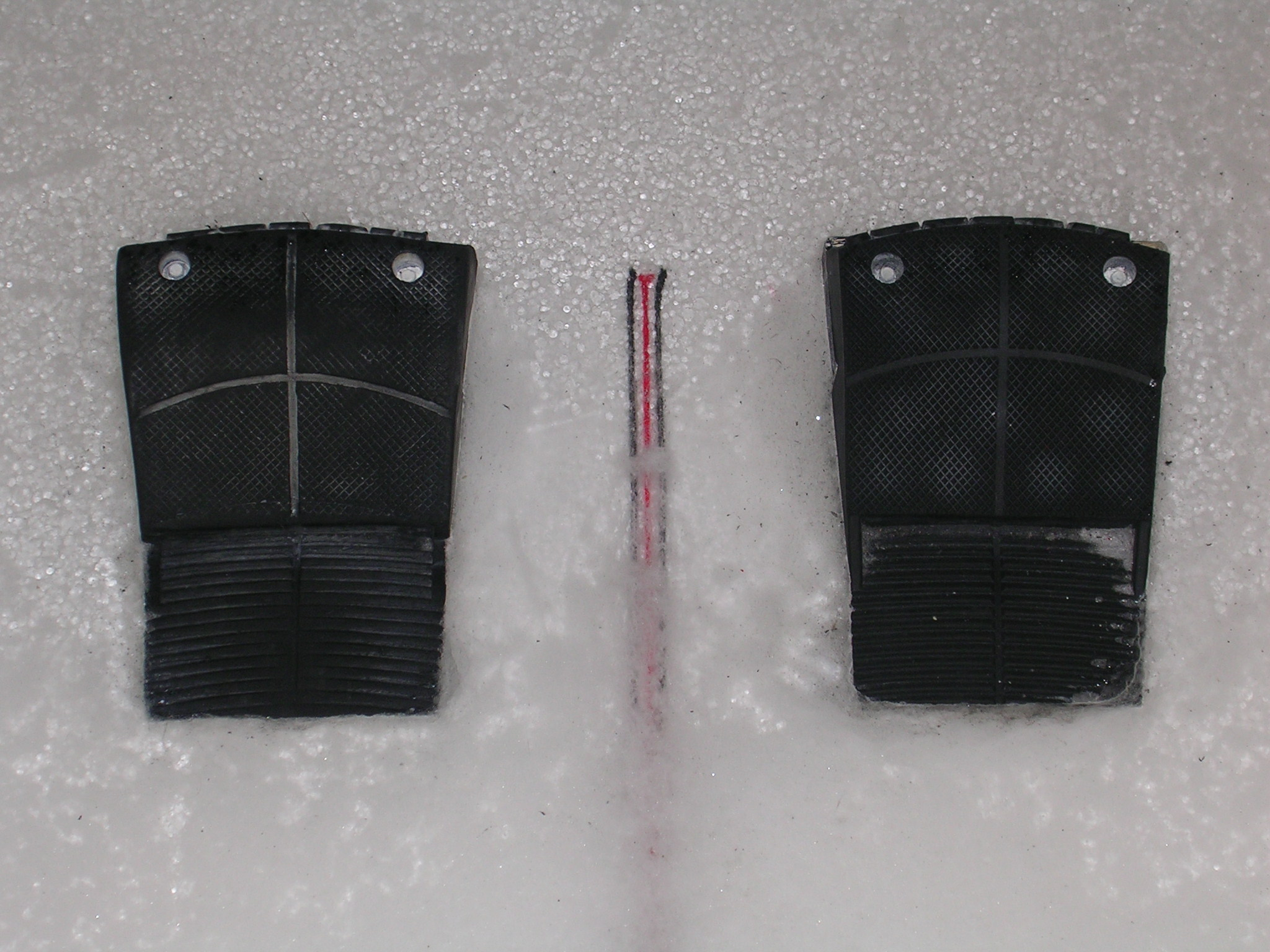
Ferraro's invention, the "Marco Hack". His first name appears behind the hacks (not visible here).

Also during the 1980s, Ferraro invented the "Marco Hack", which later became the official hack used in curling matches beginning in 1989. His first name "Marco" appears on these hacks which are a mainstay in the modern curling rink, appearing in about 95% of curling clubs around the world.

From 2009 to 2015 Ferraro worked as marketing director and then as General Manager of Curling Quebec. Ferraro played lead for Quebec at the 2010 Canadian Senior Curling Championships, on a team skipped by Pierre Charette. The team finished with a 6–5 record, missing the playoffs.

After an eight-month battle with brain cancer, Ferraro died in August 2017 at the Notre-Dame Hospital.
