= Kentville Research and Development Centre =

Research centre in Nova Scotia, Canada

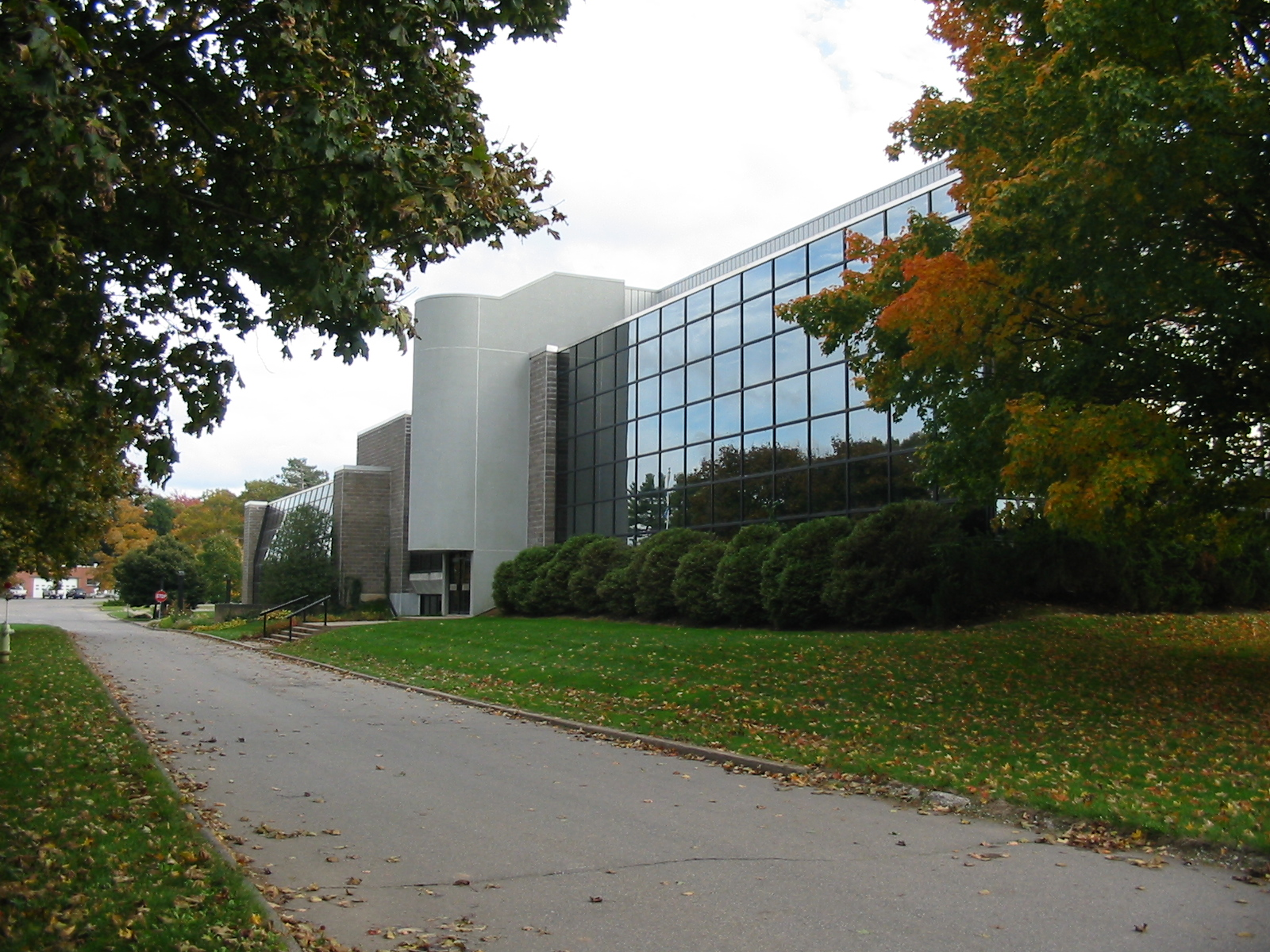
- Main facade of the Kentville Research and Development Centre

- Location within Canada
- Former names: Atlantic Food and Horticulture Research Centre, Kentville Research Centre

General information
- Location: Nova Scotia, Canada, Canada
- Coordinates: 45°04′08″N 64°28′41″W
- Elevation: 20 m (66 ft)
- Construction started: 1911
- Owner: Canadian federal government

Website
- Official website

The Kentville Research and Development Centre (formerly Atlantic Food and Horticulture Research Centre) is a branch of Agriculture and Agri-Food Canada's national network of 20 research centres stationed across Canada. The site is situated on 464 acres (188 ha; 0.725 sq mi) in Kentville, located in Nova Scotia's Annapolis Valley. The Centre's programs address agricultural challenges throughout the Canadian horticultural and food network, but primarily focus on the regional requirements of Atlantic Canada. On September 2, 2003, the centre's staff was recognized by Environment Canada for providing a volunteer climate observation station for a continuous 70 years. On January 26, 2011, and in honour of their centennial celebration, the centre was bestowed with an honorary membership to the Nova Scotia Fruit Growers Association in recognition of the centre's development and support of a sustainable tree fruit industry in Atlantic Canada.

== History ==
The centre was first established as the Kentville Research Centre by the Canadian federal government in 1911 on request by the Nova Scotia Fruit Growers Association. During the early 20th century, Nova Scotia's 2.5 million apple trees were the major supplier of apples to England and the association requested assistance to help expand commercial production to meet demand.

In 1912 William Saxby Blair was appointed the centre's first Superintendent, and research began on breeding new fruit varieties, experimenting with planting and harvesting methods, and improving pest and disease resistance. Trials did not focus solely on apples, however, and by 1929 had grown to include many different fruits and vegetables, cereals, flax and hemp. The centre also expanded its research to encompass crop protection, water management and evaluation, post-harvest storage, seed indexing, and an extensive pollination study, housing 184 bee colonies at the centre by 1928.

The centre's research into large-scale food dehydration, canning, and freezing created export opportunities for fruit and vegetable producers that had outgrown the local markets ability to sustain their expansion. In 1929 Cecil B. Eidt developed a forced-air food dehydrator that improved the production of dehydrated fruits and vegetables. The Eidt Dehydrator allowed production of thousands of tonnes of dehydrated vegetables in Canada during World War II and was the leading dehydration technology until the 1960s.

In 1933, Dr. Charles Eaves launched a post-harvest research program at the centre, and in 1939 introduced one of the first atmospherically controlled storage facilities for fruits and vegetables in the western hemisphere. The unit extended the shelf life of produce by lowering the ambient amount of oxygen and carbon dioxide, which help to trigger organic decomposition.

The centre also expanded its studies to include chicken-egg incubation research, and poultry health and breeding, decreasing by half the time required to raise a 2 kilograms (4.4 lb) chicken.

In 1996 the Honeycrisp apple variety (developed by the University of Minnesota) was recognized as a potential high quality cultivar for Nova Scotia's growing climate, and research began on establishing proper production methods and post-harvest storage. This variety became extremely popular with consumers, and as of 2011 there were more than 100,000 honeycrisp apple trees planted in the province.

In 1995 The Kentville Research Centre was renamed the Atlantic Food and Horticulture Research Centre.

== Present ==
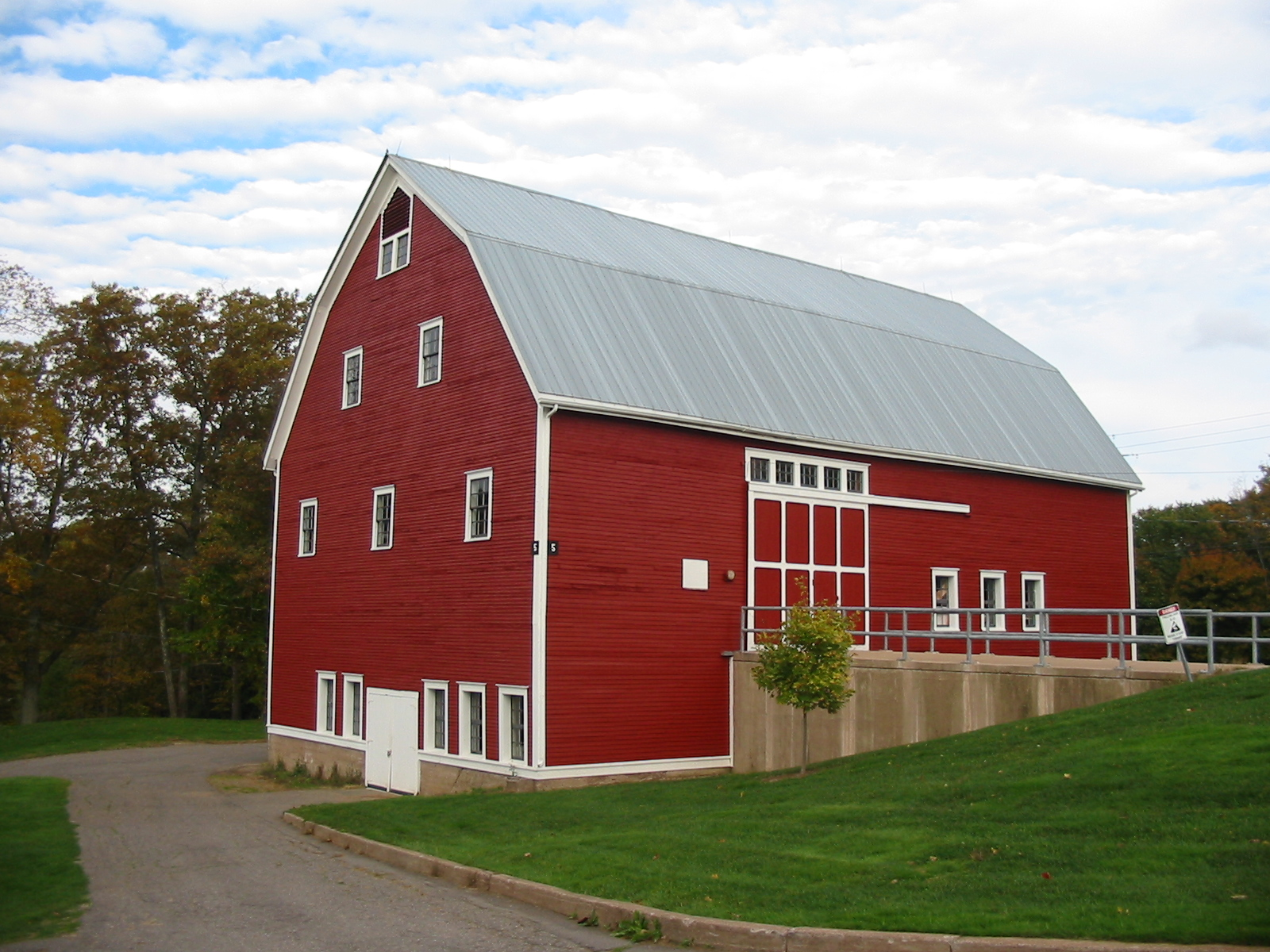
The Main Barn

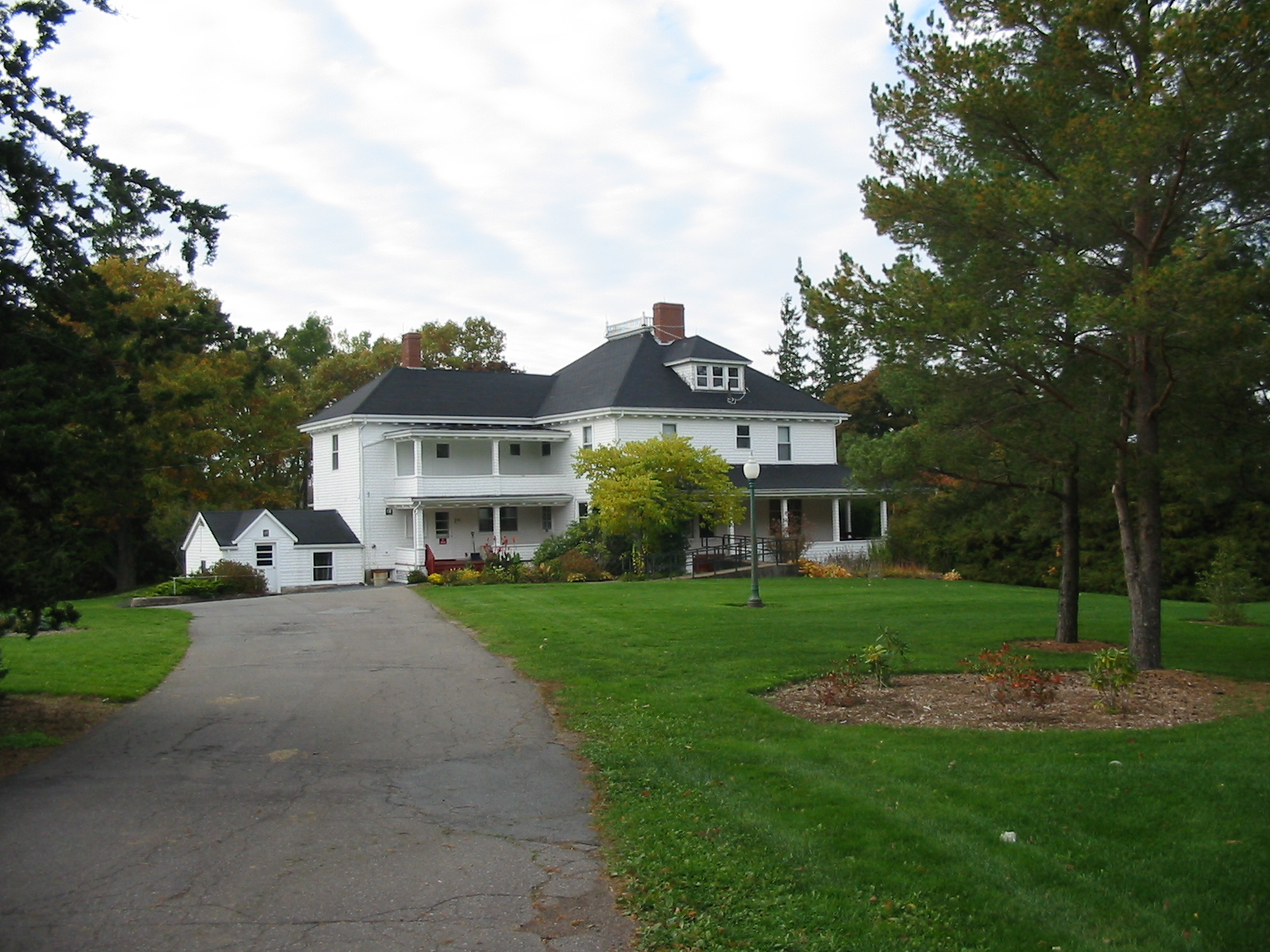
Blair House Museum

As of 2012, the centre employs 35 researchers with a total staff of 120, and continues its projects and studies concerning agricultural research. Two structures at the centre are officially recognized by the Canadian government as historical places:

- The Main Barn, built in 1912, is noted both for its historic and architectural value and was designated as a Federal Heritage Building in 1994.
- "Building 18" (Also known as Blair House) was built in 1911 and served as the presiding superintendent's residence until 1979. It is recognized for its historical, architectural, and environmental value and was designated as a Federal Heritage Building in 1994. Building 18 was converted into the Blair House Museum and was opened to the public on May 29, 1981. The museum showcases the history of Nova Scotia's apple industry and the past and present research of the centre.

A popular hiking trail is also located at the centre. The Kentville Ravine Trail is approximately 4.3 kilometres (2.7 mi) long and follows a small brook through old growth Hemlock trees. Clean water, a picnic area, and flush toilets are provided at the trail head.

Each June the centre hosts an annual open-house called Rhododendron Sunday. Visitors are able to tour the facility and the gardens, whose collection of azaleas and rhododendrons comprise the largest collection of flowering shrubs in Atlantic Canada.

== Satellite operations ==
=== Nappan Research Farm ===
The Kentville Research and Development Centre also manages the Nappan Research Farm in Nappan, Nova Scotia. The farm is located in northern part of the province in close proximity to Amherst and the New Brunswick border.

The research farm was created in 1888 and is one of the five original experimental farms established in Canada. The site encompasses 598 acres (242 ha; 0.934 sq mi) of mixed pastureland, including reclaimed salt marshes.

Study focuses primarily on climate monitoring, soil research (including full botanical and nutritional analysis), estimating pasture biomass, and the analyzing of forage and feed samples. The centre also extends into livestock research, housing 80 beef cow/calf pairs, 60 finishing cattle, and 25-30 heifers.

=== Sheffield Research Farm ===
The Sheffield farm was established in 1957 and occupies 187 acres (76 ha; 0.292 sq mi) located in Upper Canard, Nova Scotia. As with the Nappan Research Farm, research is primarily based on soil study including drainage, climate monitoring, and vegetation research. As of 2016, the Sheffield Research farm has been sold and is no longer a part of AAFC.
