= 112th Battalion (Nova Scotia), CEF =

Canadian infantry battalion

The 112th Battalion (Nova Scotia), CEF, was an infantry battalion of the Great War Canadian Expeditionary Force. The 112th Battalion was authorized on 22 December 1915 and embarked for Great Britain on 23 July 1916, where it provided reinforcements for the Canadian Corps in the field until 7 January 1917, when its personnel were absorbed by the 26th Reserve Battalion, CEF. The battalion disbanded on 15 August 1918.

The 112th Battalion recruited throughout Nova Scotia and was mobilized at Windsor, Nova Scotia.

The 112th Battalion was commanded by Lt.-Col. H.B. Tremain from 23 July 1916 to 4 December 1916.

The 112th Battalion was awarded the battle honour THE GREAT WAR 1916–17.

The 112th Battalion (Nova Scotia), CEF, is perpetuated by the West Nova Scotia Regiment.

== Sources ==
Canadian Expeditionary Force 1914–1919 by Col. G.W.L. Nicholson, CD, Queen's Printer, Ottawa, Ontario, 1962
