= Kentville =

- Town
- Aerial view of downtown

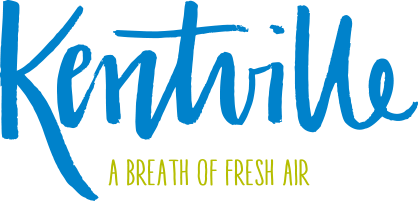
- Flag Seal
- Motto: "Magna E Parva"
- Location of Kentville, Nova Scotia Kentville (Canada)
- Coordinates: 45°04′39″N 64°29′45″W
- Country: Canada
- Province: Nova Scotia
- County: Kings County
- Incorporated: 7 December 1886
- Electoral Districts Federal: Kings-Hants
- Provincial: Kings North

Government
  - Type: Town Council
  - Mayor: Jack McNeil
  - MLA: John Lohr (PC)
  - MP: Kody Blois (Lib)

Area
  - Land: 17.08 km^{2} (6.59 sq mi)
  - Urban: 27.98 km^{2} (10.80 sq mi)
  - Metro: 607.05 km^{2} (234.38 sq mi)
- Elevation: 31 m (102 ft)

Population (2021)
  - Town: 6,630
  - Density: 388.2/km^{2} (1,005/sq mi)
  - Metro: 26,929
  - Metro density: 44.4/km^{2} (115/sq mi)
  - Change (2016-21): ▲5.7
- Time zone: UTC-4 (AST)
  - Summer (DST): UTC-3 (ADT)
- Postal code(s): B4N
- Area code: 902: 300 326 365 385 599 670 678 679 680 681 690 691 692 698 713 938 993
- Dwellings: 3,090
- Median Income*: $68,500 CDN
- Website: kentville.ca
- Median household income, 2020 (all households)

The Town of Kentville is an incorporated town in Nova Scotia, Canada. It is the most populous town in the Annapolis Valley. As of 2021, the town's population was 6,630. Its census agglomeration is 26,929.

== History ==
Kentville/Obsitquetchk owes its location to the Cornwallis River which, downstream from the Town, becomes a large tidal river at the Minas Basin. The riverbank at the current location of Kentville provided an easy fording point. The Mi'kmaq name for the location was "Obsitquetchk". The ford and later the bridge in Kentville made the area an important crossroads for other settlements in the Annapolis Valley. Kentville also marked the limit of navigation of sailing ships.

=== Acadian settlement ===
The area was first settled by Acadians, who built many dykes along the river to keep the high Bay of Fundy tides out of their farmland. These dykes created the ideal fertile soil that the Annapolis Valley is known for. The Acadians were expelled from the area in the Bay of Fundy Campaign (1755) by the British authorities because they would not swear allegiance to the British king. The area was then settled by New England Planters. Settlement was expedited by the United Empire Loyalists during the American Revolution.

=== English settlement ===
The town was originally known as Horton's Corner, but was named Kentville in 1826 after Prince Edward Augustus, Duke of Kent (son of King George III and father of Queen Victoria), who resided in Nova Scotia from 1794 to 1800. The village was at first relatively small and dwarfed by larger valley towns with better harbours such as Canning and Wolfville. The crossroads location did attract early shopkeepers and several stagecoach inns. Small schooners were able to land cargos in the "Klondyke" neighhourhood by the Cornwallis River which marked the height of navigation. Kentville developed a reputation for rowdy drinking and horse races in the early 19th century, earning the nickname "The Devil's Half Acre."

=== Mi'Kmaq and African Nova Scotian communities ===
Prior to the Town's establishment, the northern areas close to the Cornwallis River area of the municipality – once known as Pine Woods - was home to a substantial Mi’kmaq community until well into the twentieth century. The first English speaking settlers - The New England Planters - arrived between 1759 - 1768 and quickly occupied fertile farming lands south of the area that were once settled by the expelled Acadians. By the late eighteenth and early nineteenth centuries the area began to see large numbers of Black Nova Scotian families settle into the Pinewoods area (Now the north end of Kentville and Aldershot) who had been enslaved people of the Planters, descendants of enslaved people or freed black Loyalists from the United States of America. Pine Woods is one of the 52 Historic Black Communities of Nova Scotia. Since its establishment in 1886 the town has become a destination to many diverse cultures from all over the world and is the fastest growing Town in Nova Scotia. Today the town attracts people from the Philippines, Latin America, South Asia, Southeast Asia, the middle east and China. To learn more about important African Nova Scotians of the Town and surrounding areas follow this link

=== Growth ===
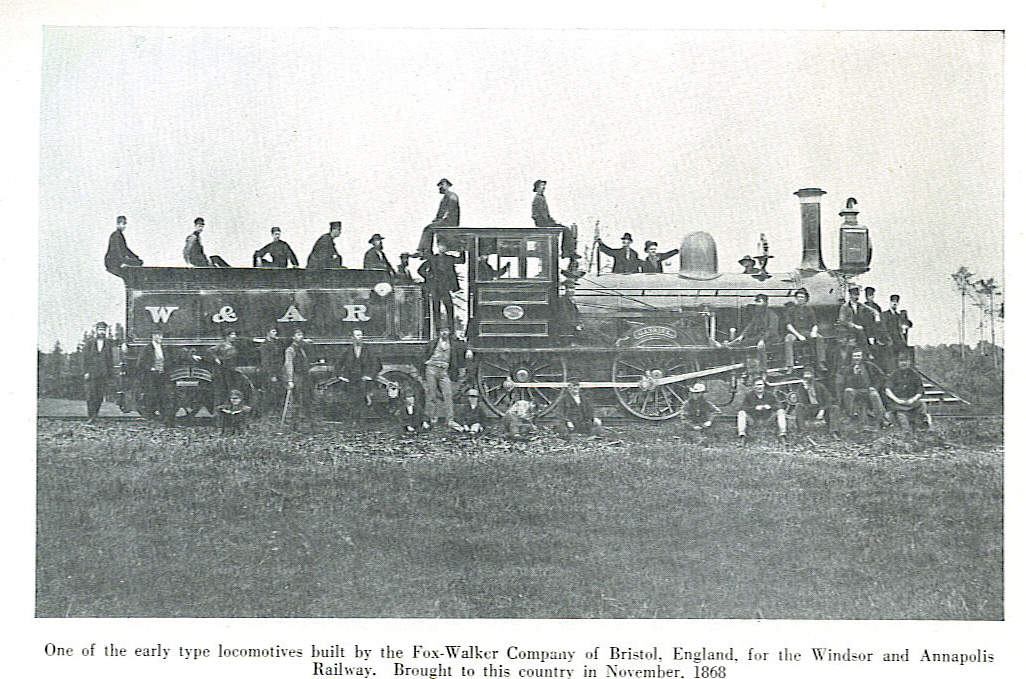
Windsor and Annapolis Railway locomotive Gabriel in Kentville, c. 1870

When the Windsor and Annapolis Railway (later named Dominion Atlantic Railway) established its headquarters in Kentville in 1868 and began shipping Annapolis Valley apples to British markets, the community began to thrive. The railway not only employed a large number of people (up to a third of the town's population), but also attracted other industries such as mills, dairies, a large foundry, and a carriage works which even entered automobile production. A branch line of the Dominion Atlantic, the Cornwallis Valley Railway, was built north to Canning and Kingsport in 1889, further developing the apple industry and creating a suburban line for workers, shoppers and schoolchildren to commute to and from Kentville. The railway also attracted large institutional developments such as a regional TB hospital, the Kentville Sanitorium, a federal agricultural research station, and an army training base at Camp Aldershot.

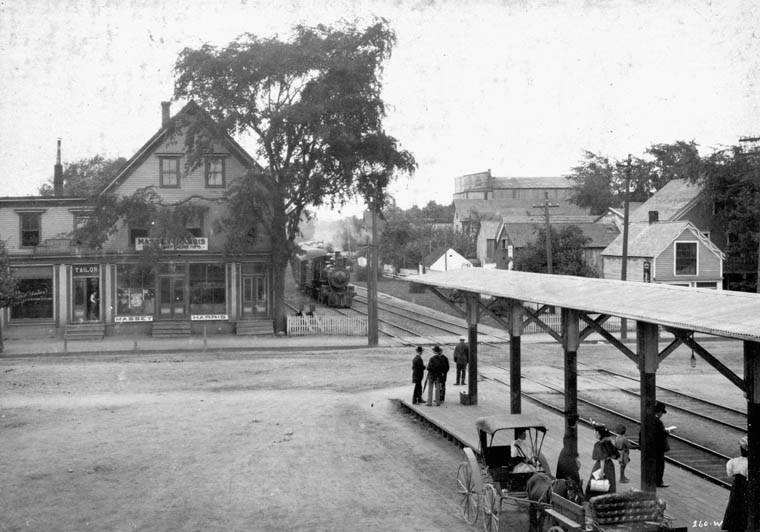
Aberdeen Street, Kentville as passenger train arrives, c. 1910

The town became a major travel centre highlighted by the large Cornwallis Inn built at the town's centre by the railway. The town boomed during World War I and World War II with heavy wartime railway traffic on the Dominion Atlantic and the training of thousands of troops at Camp Aldershot. Many residents fought overseas in the local West Nova Scotia Regiment as well as other branches of service. A Royal Canadian Navy minesweeper HMCS Kentville was named after the town, and her crew often took leave in Kentville.

=== Post war challenges ===
Kentville faced serious challenges after World War II. The dominant apple industry suffered severe declines due to the loss of its British export market. The nearby military training base at Camp Aldershot was significantly downsized and the town's major employer, the Dominion Atlantic Railway suffered serious declines with the collapse of the apple industry and the growth of highway travel. Further decline followed in the 1970s as the town lost its retail core to the growth of shopping malls and later "big box" stores in nearby New Minas. The town was also eclipsed in restaurant, upscale retail and cultural institutions by the nearby university town of Wolfville. Railway passenger service ended in 1990. Freight service ended in October 1993 and the Kentville rail shops were closed and moved to Windsor, Nova Scotia. Kentville lost many heritage buildings in the postwar period and is one of the few towns in Nova Scotia without a single designated heritage building. Major losses included the large railway station, one of the most historic in Canada which was demolished in 1990. In July 2007 the town demolished the last railway structure in town, the DAR Roundhouse, despite a province-wide protest, a move which earned the Town of Kentville a place on the "2008 Worst" List of the Heritage Canada Foundation.

== Demographics ==
Historical population
Year	Pop.	±%
1901	1,731	—
1911	2,304	+33.1%
1921	2,717	+17.9%
1931	3,033	+11.6%
1941	3,928	+29.5%
1951	4,240	+7.9%
1956	4,937	+16.4%
1961	4,612	−6.6%
1981	4,974	+7.8%
1986	5,208	+4.7%
1991	5,506	+5.7%
1996	5,551	+0.8%
2001	5,610	+1.1%
2006	5,815	+3.7%
2011	6,094	+4.8%
2016	6,271	+2.9%
2021	6,630	+5.7%

In the 2021 Census of Population conducted by Statistics Canada, Kentville had a population of 6,630 living in 2,956 of its 3,090 total private dwellings, a change of 5.7% from its 2016 population of 6,271. With a land area of 17.08 km^{2} (6.59 sq mi), it had a population density of 388.2/km^{2} (1,005.4/sq mi) in 2021.

== Industries ==
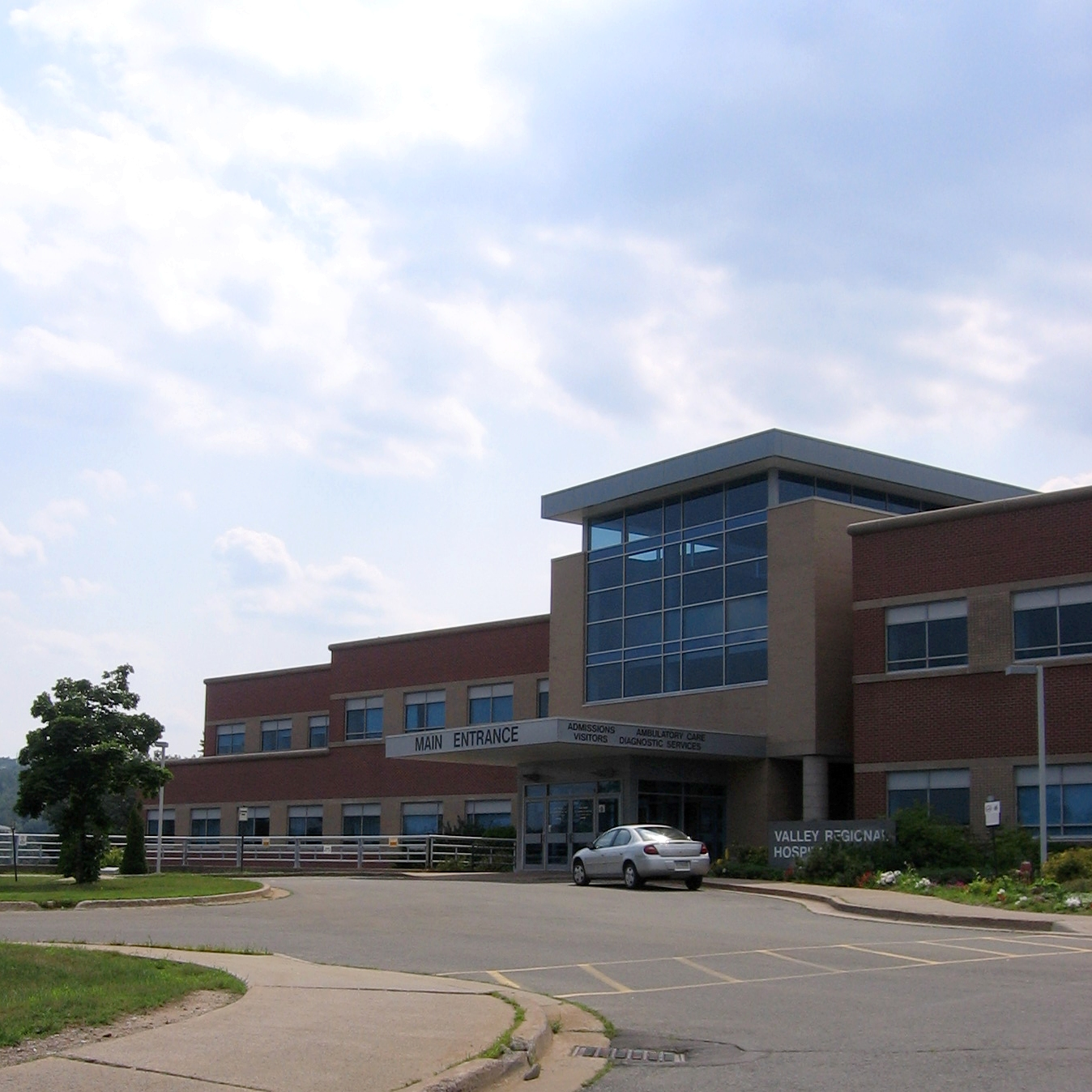
Valley Regional Hospital

During the early part of the 20th century Kentville emerged as the business centre of Kings County and despite the post-war loss of commerce to other valley communities, it remains the professional centre of the Annapolis Valley. Kentville is home to numerous professional services such as lawyers offices, doctors, and investment firms. On the outskirts of the town is the Valley Regional Hospital, built in 1991. The town is also home to the Annapolis Valley Regional Industrial Park which employs numerous people in the area through a variety of different businesses.

Agriculture, especially fruit crops such as apples, remain a prominent industry in the Kentville area, and throughout the eastern part of the valley. Kentville is home to one of the largest agricultural research facilities in Nova Scotia founded in 1911, known to the locals as The Research Station. The site now employs over 200 people and sits on 473 acres (1.91 km^{2}) of the land at the east end of the town.

Kentville shares its northern boundary along the Cornwallis River with Camp Aldershot, a military training base founded in 1904. At its peak during World War II, the camp housed approximately 7000 soldiers. Kentville native Donald Ripley wrote a book chronicling Camp Aldershot and its effect on the town entitled On The Home Front. Today the camp functions as an army reserve training centre and is the headquarters of The West Nova Scotia Regiment.

=== Electric utility (sold 1997) ===
Kentville until 1997-8 was one of seven Nova Scotia towns (along with Riverport, Berwick, Canso, Antigonish, Lunenburg and Mahone Bay) to own its own electricity distribution utility within town limits – the Kentville Electric Commission. When the other six joined into the Municipal Electric Utilities of Nova Scotia in January 1998, Kentville instead sold its utility to Nova Scotia Power, a privately owned generator and distributor whose service area covered the rest of the province.

== Community events ==
The Apple Blossom Festival, founded in 1933 is held each May to celebrate the blossoming of local apple industry, one of the region's richest forms of agriculture.

Kentville is also well known for its Pumpkin People Festival.

Other Annual Festivals and Events hosted in Kentville: Devil's Half Acre Motorcycle Rally Open Street Chalk Art Festival Kentville Multicultural Festival (currently the largest Multicultural Festival in NS) Kentville Harvest Festival KBC's Great Big Country Fair

== Climate ==
Kentville experiences a humid continental climate (Dfb). The highest temperature ever recorded in Kentville was 37.8 °C (100 °F) on 12 August 1944. The coldest temperature ever recorded was −31.1 °C (−24 °F) on 1 February 1920. Kentville's USDA Hardiness zone is 6a.

Climate data for Kentville CDA, 1981–2010 normals, (Note: Temperature normals are averaged from Kentville CDA for the period 1981–1996 and Kentville CDA CS for the period 1996–2007.) extremes 1913–present
Month	Jan	Feb	Mar	Apr	May	Jun	Jul	Aug	Sep	Oct	Nov	Dec	Year
Record high °C (°F)	18.1 (64.6)	17.3 (63.1)	25.7 (78.3)	30.1 (86.2)	32.5 (90.5)	35.0 (95.0)	36.1 (97.0)	37.8 (100.0)	33.8 (92.8)	30.3 (86.5)	23.7 (74.7)	18.5 (65.3)	37.8 (100.0)
Mean daily maximum °C (°F)	−1.2 (29.8)	−0.4 (31.3)	3.5 (38.3)	9.7 (49.5)	16.5 (61.7)	21.8 (71.2)	25.2 (77.4)	24.7 (76.5)	20.2 (68.4)	13.7 (56.7)	7.9 (46.2)	2.1 (35.8)	12.0 (53.6)
Daily mean °C (°F)	−5.3 (22.5)	−4.7 (23.5)	−0.8 (30.6)	5.2 (41.4)	11.1 (52.0)	16.3 (61.3)	19.8 (67.6)	19.3 (66.7)	15.2 (59.4)	9.4 (48.9)	4.3 (39.7)	−1.5 (29.3)	7.4 (45.3)
Mean daily minimum °C (°F)	−9.4 (15.1)	−8.9 (16.0)	−5.0 (23.0)	0.6 (33.1)	5.7 (42.3)	10.7 (51.3)	14.2 (57.6)	13.9 (57.0)	10.2 (50.4)	4.9 (40.8)	0.7 (33.3)	−5.2 (22.6)	2.7 (36.9)
Record low °C (°F)	−30.6 (−23.1)	−31.1 (−24.0)	−27.8 (−18.0)	−15.0 (5.0)	−6.7 (19.9)	−1.7 (28.9)	2.8 (37.0)	2.2 (36.0)	−3.3 (26.1)	−8.3 (17.1)	−16.1 (3.0)	−25.6 (−14.1)	−31.1 (−24.0)
Average precipitation mm (inches)	116.1 (4.57)	101.3 (3.99)	109.8 (4.32)	92.7 (3.65)	102.1 (4.02)	81.6 (3.21)	84.0 (3.31)	76.7 (3.02)	84.4 (3.32)	89.0 (3.50)	121.5 (4.78)	122.0 (4.80)	1,181.2 (46.50)
Average rainfall mm (inches)	50.8 (2.00)	46.3 (1.82)	67.1 (2.64)	73.8 (2.91)	97.3 (3.83)	81.6 (3.21)	84.0 (3.31)	76.7 (3.02)	84.4 (3.32)	89.0 (3.50)	108.9 (4.29)	70.9 (2.79)	930.8 (36.65)
Average snowfall cm (inches)	71.4 (28.1)	59.2 (23.3)	45.2 (17.8)	17.2 (6.8)	4.0 (1.6)	0.0 (0.0)	0.0 (0.0)	0.0 (0.0)	0.0 (0.0)	0.0 (0.0)	12.9 (5.1)	53.1 (20.9)	263.0 (103.5)
Average precipitation days (≥ 0.2 mm)	17.5	14.8	13.6	13.9	14.1	12.6	11.7	10.9	11.0	13.6	15.7	17.2	166.6
Average rainy days (≥ 0.2 mm)	6.9	5.5	7.8	12.1	14.0	12.6	11.7	10.9	11.0	13.6	13.9	9.0	129.0
Average snowy days (≥ 0.2 cm)	13.1	11.6	8.3	3.6	0.31	0.0	0.0	0.0	0.0	0.0	2.9	10.7	50.5
Average dew point °C (°F)	−5.6 (21.9)	−7.1 (19.2)	−4.7 (23.5)	−2.6 (27.3)	3.6 (38.5)	10.9 (51.6)	15.5 (59.9)	13.2 (55.8)	10.2 (50.4)	5.7 (42.3)	2.4 (36.3)	−0.6 (30.9)	3.4 (38.1)
Mean monthly sunshine hours	77.8	101.6	133.0	156.5	198.9	214.0	234.8	225.9	178.4	141.3	78.6	65.0	1,805.7
Percentage possible sunshine	27.3	34.6	36.0	38.7	43.2	45.9	49.7	51.8	47.3	41.5	27.3	23.7	38.9
Source: Environment Canada

== Famous residents ==
(From in or near Kentville, including the former Township of Cornwallis)

- Composer Robert Aitken (born 1939)
- Federal Cabinet Minister Anita Anand (born 1967)
- CFL All Canadian Bruce Beaton
- Blue Man Group member Scott Bishop
- Former NHLer Jerry Byers
- Actor Peter Donat
- Inventor of kerosene Abraham Gesner (1797–1864)
- Boxer Bryan Gibson
- Filmmaker Dylan Mohan Gray
- Author and musician Thibault Jacquot-Paratte
- Comedian Jay Malone
- Blues Guitarist Dutch Mason
- Author Maria Mutch
- Linguist Silas Tertius Rand (1810–1889)
- Zoologist Austin L. Rand (1905–1982)
- MLS Forward and Canada international footballer Jacob Shaffelburg

== Education ==
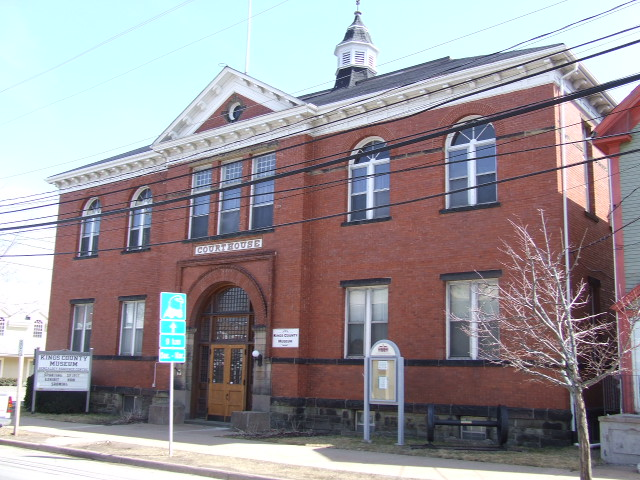
The Museum on Webster Street, Kentville.

Education in the area is serviced by Kings County Academy in Kentville, serving grades primary through eight, the local high school is Northeast Kings Education Centre, located 15–20 minutes away in Canning. There are also several post secondary institutions, the Kingstec campus of the Nova Scotia Community College is located on the northern fringe of the town and Acadia University, is located in nearby Wolfville. The town operates a library and C@P site. Kentville is also home to the Kings County Museum, located in Kentville's old courthouse. Other nearby elementary schools include the Aldershot Elementary School, and the Glooscap Elementary School.

== Recreation ==
Kentville also boasts a number of high quality recreational facilities. The Kentville Arena (now the Kentville Centennial Arena) is thought to have hosted the first ever summer ice hockey school. The town also houses a large indoor soccer arena and numerous other outdoor baseball and soccer fields, and playgrounds for local children. Kentville Memorial Park (considered to be one of the best baseball parks in Canada east of Montreal) is home to the Kentville Wildcats, a senior baseball team, who have won several NSSBL championships and one Canadian championship. Kentville swimming pool is home to the Kentville Marlins Swim Team.

== Sister city ==
- Camrose, Alberta, Canada
- Castel di Sangro, Abruzzo, Italy

== See also ==
- List of municipalities in Nova Scotia
- Royal eponyms in Canada
