= West Nova Scotia Regiment =

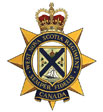
- Regimental badge
- Active: 1869–present
- Country: Canada
- Branch: Canadian Army
- Type: Line infantry
- Role: Light role
- Size: Battalion
- Part of: 36 Canadian Brigade Group
- Garrison/HQ: 5th Canadian Division Support Base Detachment Aldershot, Nova Scotia
- Motto: Semper fidelis (Latin for 'always faithful')
- March: Quick: "God Bless the Prince of Wales"; Slow: "Garb of Auld Gaul"
- Engagements: First World War; Second World War; War in Afghanistan
- Battle honours: See #Battle honours

Commanders
- Commanding officer: Lieutenant Colonel M.A Bobbitt, CD
- Regimental sergeant major: Chief Warrant Officer E. P. Smith, CD

The West Nova Scotia Regiment is a line infantry regiment of the Canadian Army, part of the Primary Reserve, and is part of the 5th Canadian Division's 36 Canadian Brigade Group. The regiment recruits volunteers from the South-Western part of the province of Nova Scotia and has its headquarters at LFAATC Aldershot, near the community of Aldershot, Nova Scotia. In the Second World War, the regiment mobilized a battalion that fought in Sicily, mainland Italy and northwestern Europe.

== Lineage ==
Regimental colour.

Camp flag.

=== The West Nova Scotia Regiment ===
- Originated 8 October 1869 in Paradise, Nova Scotia, as The First Regiment of Annapolis County Volunteers
- Redesignated 5 November 1869 as 69th The 1st Regiment of Annapolis County
- Amalgamated 1 September 1898 with The 72nd or Second Annapolis Battalion of Volunteer Militia and redesignated as the 69th "Annapolis" Battalion of Infantry
- Redesignated 8 May 1900 as the 69th Annapolis Regiment
- Redesignated 29 March 1920 as The Annapolis Regiment
- Amalgamated 15 December 1936 with The Lunenburg Regiment and redesignated The West Nova Scotia Regiment
- Redesignated 7 November 1940 as the 2nd (Reserve) Battalion, The West Nova Scotia Regiment
- Redesignated 1 November 1945 as The West Nova Scotia Regiment
- Redesignated 1 October 1954 as The West Nova Scotia Regiment (Machine Gun)
- Redesignated 11 April 1958 as The West Nova Scotia Regiment

=== 72nd or Second Annapolis Battalion of Volunteer Militia ===
- Originated 14 January 1870 in Wilmot, Nova Scotia, as The 72nd or Second Annapolis Battalion of Volunteer Militia
- Amalgamated 1 September 1898 with the 69th The 1st Regiment of Annapolis County

=== The Lunenburg Regiment ===
- Originated 12 August 1870 in Lunenburg, Nova Scotia, as the 75th Lunenburg Battalion of Infantry
- Redesignated 8 May 1900 as the 75th Lunenburg Regiment
- Redesignated 29 March 1920 as The Lunenburg Regiment
- Amalgamated 15 December 1936 with The Annapolis Regiment

=== Chart ===
Lineage chart

1812
1815
1869
1869
1870
1898
1900
1915
1916
1917
1920
1936
1939
1940
1945
1945
1954
1958
2012

1st and 2nd Bns, East Annapolis Regt	1st and 2nd Bns, King’s County Regt	1st and 2nd Bns, West Annapolis Regt
Disbanded	Disbanded	Disbanded
The First Regt of Annapolis County Volunteers
69th The 1st Regt of Annapolis County
The 72nd or Second Annapolis Bn of Volunteer Militia	75th Lunenburg Bn of Infy
69th "Annapolis" Bn of Infy
69th Annapolis Regt	75th Lunenburg Regt
112th "Overseas" Infy Bn, CEF
219th "Overseas" Infy Bn, CEF
Absorbed by 26th Reserve Bn	Absorbed by 17th Reserve Bn
1st Bn (112th Bn, CEF), The Annapolis Regt	1st Bn (219th Bn, CEF), The Lunenburg Regt
The West NS Regt
The West NS Regt, CASF
1st Bn, The West NS Regt, CASF	2nd (Reserve) Bn, The West NS Regt
3rd Canadian Infy Bn (The West NS Regt), CASF
Disbanded	Disbanded	The West NS Regt
The West NS Regt (MG)
The West NS Regt
Perpetuates War of 1812 units

== Perpetuations ==
=== War Of 1812 ===
- 1st Battalion, East Annapolis Regiment
- 2nd Battalion, East Annapolis Regiment
- 1st Battalion, King's County Regiment
- 2nd Battalion, King's County Regiment
- 1st Battalion, West Annapolis Regiment
- 2nd Battalion, West Annapolis Regiment

=== The Great War ===
- 112th Battalion (Nova Scotia), CEF
- 219th Highland Battalion (Nova Scotia), CEF

== Operational history ==
=== Great War ===
Details of the 69th Annapolis Regiment and 75th Lunenburg Regiment were placed called out on active service on 6 August 1914 for local protection duties.

The 112th Battalion (Nova Scotia), CEF was authorized on 22 December 1915 and embarked for Great Britain on 23 July 1916. There it provided reinforcements for the Canadian Corps in the field until 7 January 1917, when its personnel were absorbed by the 26th Reserve Battalion, CEF. The battalion was subsequently disbanded on 15 August 1918.

The 219th Highland Battalion (Nova Scotia), CEF was authorized on 15 July 1916 and embarked for Great Britain on 12 October 1916. There it provided reinforcements for the Canadian Corps in the field until 23 January 1917, when its personnel were absorbed by the 17th Reserve Battalion, CEF. The battalion was subsequently disbanded on 15 September 1917.

=== Second World War ===
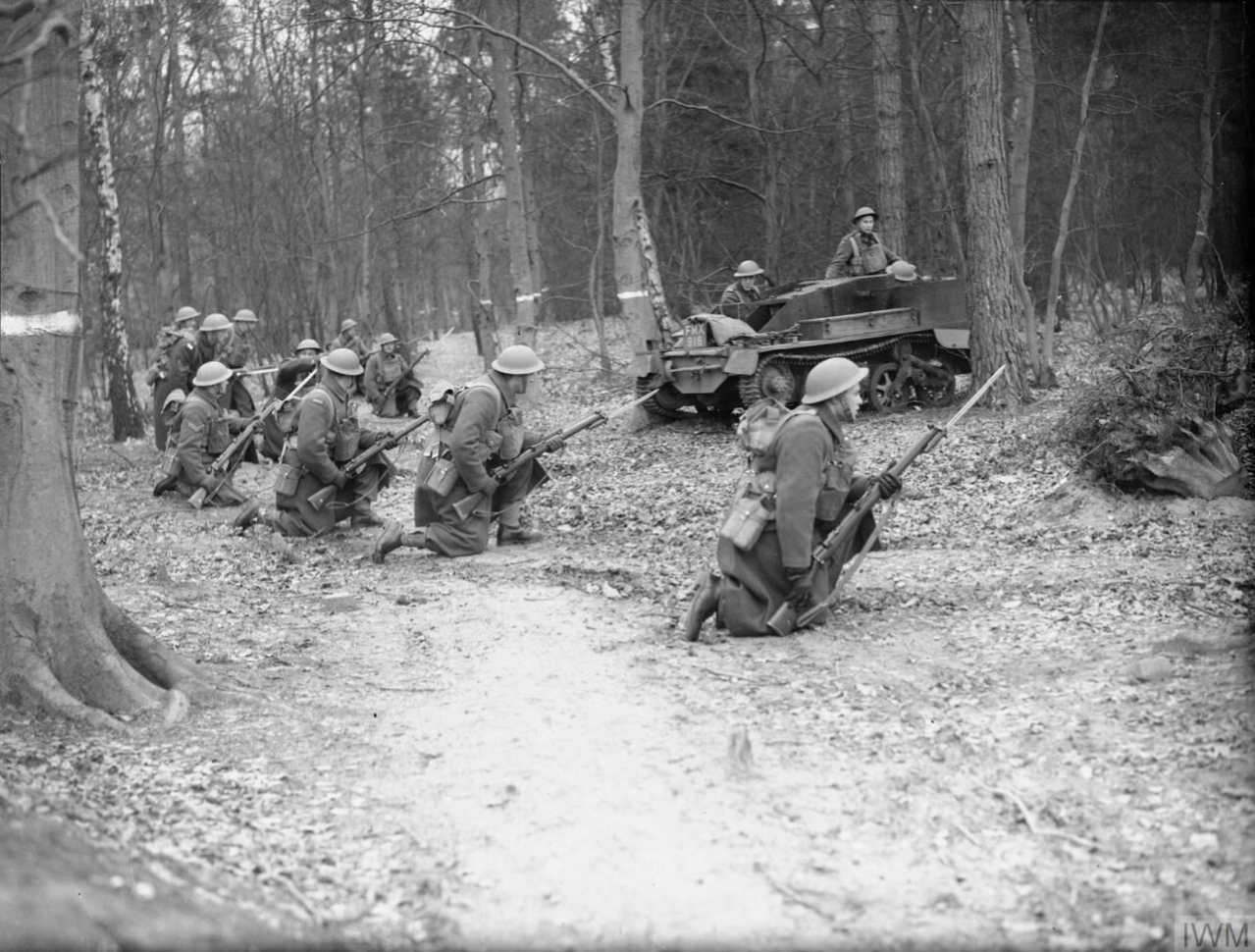
Troops of the regiment's carrier platoon training near Aldershot, England. 29 February 1940

The regiment mobilized as The West Nova Scotia Regiment, CASF, for active service on 1 September 1939. The unit then embarked on MS Chrobry for Great Britain on 21 December 1939 arriving in Gourock, Scotland, on 29 December 1939. The unit arrived by train from Scotland in the Farnborough / Cove area of Surrey on New Year's Day 1940 and were billeted at Guillemont Barracks. The unit was redesignated as the 1st Battalion, The West Nova Scotia Regiment, CASF, on 7 November 1940. It landed in Sicily on 10 July 1943, and in Italy on 3 September 1943, as part of the 3rd Infantry Brigade, 1st Canadian Infantry Division. On 19 March 1945, the battalion moved with the I Canadian Corps to North West Europe, where it fought until the end of the war. The overseas battalion was disbanded on 15 October 1945.

On 1 June 1945, a second Active Force component of the regiment was mobilized for service in the Pacific theatre of operations designated as the 3rd Canadian Infantry Battalion (The West Nova Scotia Regiment), CASF. Following VJ-Day the battalion was disbanded on 1 November 1945.

=== Post war ===
Individual members of the West Nova Scotia Regiment with Canadian Contingents on United Nations and NATO peacekeeping missions in countries such as the former Yugoslavia, Cyprus and the Middle East.

=== War in Afghanistan ===
The regiment contributed an aggregate of more than 20% of its authorized strength to the various Task Forces which served in Afghanistan between 2002 and 2014.

== Alliances ==
- United Kingdom — The Duke of Lancaster's Regiment (King's Lancashire and Border)

== Battle honours ==
Regimental colour

In the list below, battle honours in capitals were awarded for participation in large operations and campaigns, while those in lowercase indicate honours granted for more specific battles. Those battle honours followed by a "+" are emblazoned on the regimental colour.

=== War of 1812 honours ===
- Honorary distinction: the non-emblazonable honorary distinction DEFENCE OF CANADA - 1812-1815 - DÉFENSE DU CANADA.

=== Great War honours ===
- ARRAS, 1917, '18+
- HILL 70+
- Ypres 1917+
- Amiens+
- Hindenburg Line+
- Pursuit to Mons+

=== Second World War honours ===
- Landing in Sicily+
- Valguarnera
- ADRANO
- Catenanuova+
- Centuripe
- Sicily, 1943
- Landing at Reggio
- Potenza+
- Gambatesa
- The Sangro+
- Castel di Sangro
- The Gully+
- Cassino II
- Gustav Line
- Liri Valley
- Hitler Line+
- Melfa Crossing
- GOTHIC LINE+
- LAMONE CROSSING+
- RIMINI LINE+
- San Martino–San Lorenzo
- San Fortunato
- Savio Bridgehead
- Italy, 1943–1945
- Apeldoorn
- NORTH-WEST EUROPE, 1945+

=== Afghanistan honours ===
- Afghanistan

== See also ==
- Military history of Nova Scotia

== Media ==
- West Novas : A History of the West Nova Scotia Regiment by Thomas H, Raddall (1986)

== Order of precedence ==
Preceded by The Royal New Brunswick Regiment (Carleton & York)	The West Nova Scotia Regiment	Succeeded by The North Shore (New Brunswick) Regiment
