= SS Aldershot =

Aldershot was the name of a number of steamships

- SS Aldershot (1897), built for Watts, Watts & Co
- SS Aldershot (1910), built for the London, Brighton and South Coast Railway as SS Brittany. Renamed Aldershot in 1933 by the Southern Railway
- SS Aldershot (1944), built as Liberty ship Noah Brown, renamed Aldershot in 1955
