= Camp Aldershot =

Camp Aldershot Kentville (Camp Aldershot) Heliport
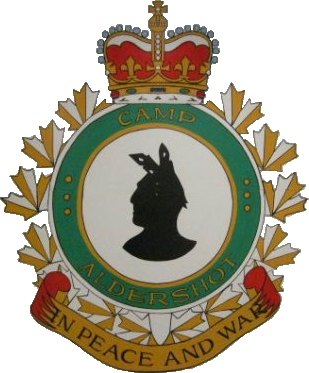
- IATA: none; ICAO: none; LID: CKM9

Summary
- Airport type: Military
- Owner: Government of Canada
- Operator: Department of National Defence
- Location: Kentville, Nova Scotia
- Built: 1890s
- Time zone: AST (UTC−04:00)
  - Summer (DST): ADT (UTC−03:00)
- Elevation AMSL: 100 ft (30 m)
- Coordinates: 45°05′39″N 064°30′32″W
- Website: Camp Aldershot

Map
- Location of 5 Cdn Div Support Group Detachment Aldershot in Nova Scotia

Helipads
Number	Length		Surface
Number	ft	m	Surface
1	500	152	Turf/gravel
- Source: Canada Flight Supplement

Camp Aldershot is a Canadian Army training facility located in Kings County, Nova Scotia. It is a unit of the 5th Canadian Division Support Group of the 5th Canadian Division.

Camp Aldershot is located 0.5 nautical miles (0.93 km; 0.58 mi) northwest of Kentville on a well-drained sandy plateau along the north side of the Cornwallis River. Surrounded by the agricultural heartland of Nova Scotia in the Annapolis Valley, Camp Aldershot is situated primarily on marginal agricultural land not suitable for crops. Relatively few military personnel are stationed at the camp as it serves primarily for training regular force and Primary Reserve units such as The West Nova Scotia Regiment.

Camp Aldershot conducts year-round courses for Regular Force and Primary Reserve personnel, while expanding dramatically during the summer months to accommodate the numerous courses for Primary Reserve personnel and some Regular Force courses. Throughout the year, the Royal Canadian Navy, the Canadian Army and the Royal Canadian Air Force conduct training at Aldershot, as well as elements of Canada's Canadian Special Operations Forces Command. This training varies from basic recruit training to advanced demolitions training.

During the period of September–June 5 Cdn Div Support Group Det Aldershot also serves as the primary weekend training location for Primary Reserve and Royal Canadian Army Cadets exercises for units from the Halifax metro area, and other locations in the Maritime Provinces.

== Camp Aldershot ==
During the 1890s and the lead up to the Boer War, the British Army, which was responsible for Canada's defence until 1906, established Military Camp Aldershot (also shortened to Camp Aldershot) as a training area on land in the western part of Kings County between the villages of Aylesford and Kingston. Camp Aldershot was intended to train Canadian Militia units from Nova Scotia and was served by the Cornwallis Valley Railway branch line of the Dominion Atlantic Railway line running through the area. It received its name in honour of Aldershot in Hampshire, United Kingdom, the site of the home of the British Army.

In 1904, the facility was moved to its present site on 1,136 ha (2,810 acres) northwest of Kentville with its southern boundary along the Cornwallis River. The eastern boundary of the base abutted the Cornwallis Valley Railway which operated north from Kentville to Kingsport, providing efficient transport of troops and supplies. The Department of Militia and Defence took over administration of the facility from the British Army in 1906.

Used almost exclusively as a militia facility from its inception, various militia units of cavalry, infantry and artillery from across Nova Scotia received training. Few permanent structures were established at Camp Aldershot in its early years, with militia units being required to erect canvas tents during training and to stable horses in the open.

Camp Aldershot saw extensive use during the First World War with in excess of 7,000 soldiers being trained for the infantry at any particular time. Temporary buildings were constructed to house messes and cookhouses, as well as a camp hospital, however most soldiers training at Camp Aldershot during this time period were housed in canvas tents. Temporary structures were removed following the armistice in 1918 and the camp reverted to its previous use as a militia training facility, seeing very light use throughout the inter-war period when Canada's military underwent extensive downsizing.

Given its proximity to Halifax which became a major troop shipment port, the camp underwent significant expansion during the Second World War with numerous new buildings constructed between 1939 and 1943. Only a single building from the First World War was retained, while water and sewer systems were installed in the camp's headquarters area (which was named Aldershot for postal purposes), firing ranges and parade squares established and various support buildings and barracks.

Despite the construction of barracks, the huge influx of soldiers required the use of tents for housing along with temporary cookhouses. Camp Aldershot hosted the Canadian Army's 14 Advanced Infantry (Rifle) Training Centre (14 AITC) throughout the war. 14 AITC included instructor schools, trade schools, and officer training schools. The facility experienced some of its most demanding training toward the end of the war as the 14 AITC was tasked with preparing troops for Operation Downfall, the invasion of Japan.

Following the war, Camp Aldershot went into decline when compared to its war-time activity, however its well-constructed Second World War-era facilities were maintained given the tensions of the Cold War. In 1953 The Black Watch (Royal Highland Regiment) of Canada returned from service in the Korean War and the First and Second Battalions were stationed at Camp Aldershot, along with additional units at Camp Debert. From 1953 to 1959, Camp Aldershot saw significant use while housing this regular force unit. The Black Watch's 2,300 soldiers along with dependents and civilian support staff pumped $15 million annually into the local economy.

The Black Watch rotated to West Germany in 1959 and was stationed at the newly constructed Camp Gagetown in New Brunswick upon its return, delivering a significant blow to Camp Aldershot and Camp Debert, which had no regular force units returning to fill the void. Camp Aldershot was left with the Canadian Army's reserve militia units from Nova Scotia as its primary users, primarily The West Nova Scotia Regiment, however the Royal Canadian Army Cadets also used the camp as a Cadet Summer Training Centre (CSTC) from the late 1940s-late 1960s.

== Aldershot range and training area ==
The late 1960s saw numerous changes to Canada's military during the unification of the Canadian Forces. Camp Aldershot underwent more decline as facility rationalization throughout the military took place and the army cadets established ACSTC Argonaut at CFB Gagetown. Rumours of the camp being declared surplus began during the early 1970s when military activity was at an all-time low, thus the new Atlantic Militia Area of Mobile Command began to increase training of reservists at the newly designated Militia Training Centre on the site in 1973. The use of the term "Camp Aldershot" was officially discontinued in lieu of Aldershot Range and Training Area.

== LFAATC Aldershot ==
Training continued at ARTA through the 1970s and 1980s until the mid-1990s when the camp was designated to become host to the newly formed Land Force Atlantic Area training centre, officially termed LFAA TC Aldershot.

Since the LFAATC was located at Aldershot, the majority of the Second World War-era buildings have been replaced by new construction, although the single First World War-era structure that was maintained has been incorporated as the new officers mess. Currently 5 Cdn Div TC Detachment Aldershot provides the majority of training for the 5th Canadian Division reserve units during the summer months, as well as a training area for Nova Scotia reserve units through the remainder of the year.

== Mess and barracks ==
The mess is located behind only a few steps from course barracks. It has two serveries with only one open most days and a senior and officer eating area. The barracks for course as well as the class rooms, computer lab and offices all share one building. Half of the build is two top and bottom H hallways with rooms on the outer of the four halls. Rooms consist of eight bunks and three bunks and lockers. Each wing (A, B, C, D) has their own common room which consists of a TV and some sofa chairs, a microwave and table with chairs. They also have a kit cleaning room.

== Local freedoms ==
Land Force Atlantic Area Training Centre Aldershot was awarded the Freedom of the Town of Kentville, Nova Scotia on October 14, 2012.
