= Aldershot, Nova Scotia =

Community in Nova Scotia, Canada

Coordinates: 45°05′59.43″N 64°30′53.13″W

Aldershot in Nova Scotia

Aldershot is a community in the Canadian province of Nova Scotia, located in Kings County.

A quasi-suburb of Kentville, Aldershot developed as a farming community along the Cornwallis Valley Railway branchline of the Dominion Atlantic Railway in the 19th century, served by Nova Scotia Route 359. The community grew substantially after 1904 when the British Army and later the Department of Militia and Defence expropriated a large tract of land north of the Cornwallis River for an army training facility. Named Camp Aldershot, it continues to operate.
