= Scottish regiment =

Military units with some form of connection to Scotland

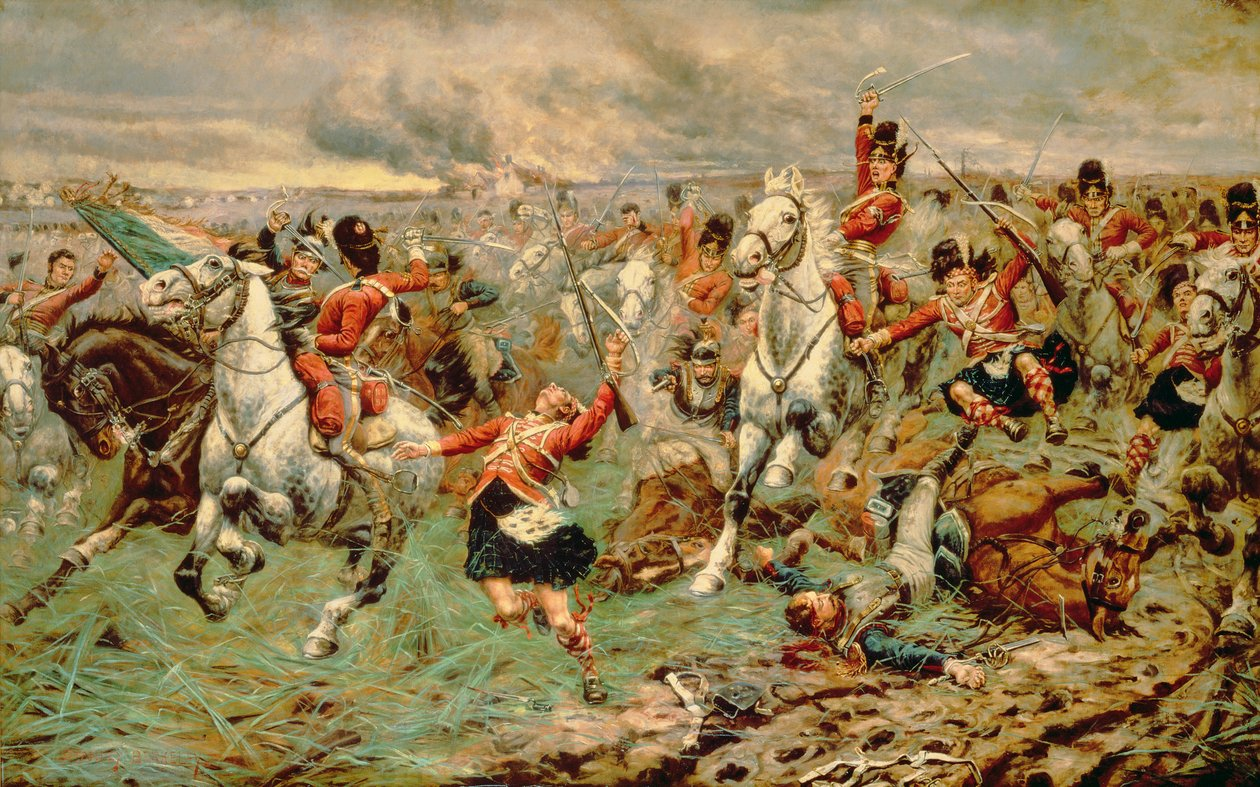
The Scots Greys and 92nd Foot, two Scottish regiments of the British Army, at the Battle of Waterloo

Scottish regiments are military units which at some point during their existence have had a form of connection with Scotland. Though the military history of Scotland dates back to the era of classical antiquity, the first organised Scottish military units were formed in the Middle Ages, mostly to serve in the Anglo-Scottish Wars or the Hundred Years' War. Numerous Scottish units also fought in the Wars of the Three Kingdoms, and during the 1660 Stuart Restoration the Scots Army was established as the army of the Kingdom of Scotland.

As a result of the Acts of Union 1707, the Scots Army was merged with the English Army to form the British Army, which contained numerous prominent Scottish regiments. Several Scottish regiments were also raised by the armies of the British Empire, including the Australian Army, Canadian Army and South African Army. Two Union army regiments which served in the American Civil War also cultivated a "Scottish" identity. Scottish regiments often adopt elements of the culture of Scotland, including bagpipes, kilts, feather bonnets and the Glengarry. Scottish regiments and in particular Highland regiments, made a significant contribution to the military expansion and maintenance of the British Empire during the 19th and 20th centuries.

== History ==
=== Lowland regiments ===
These generally pre-date the more widely known Highland regiments (see below). The senior Lowland regiment was the Royal Scots (the Royal Regiment) which dates from 1633. The Royal Scots Fusiliers and the King's Own Scottish Borderers were subsequently raised in 1678 and 1689 respectively. Throughout the 17th, 18th and most of the 19th centuries these Scottish regiments served widely and with distinction. They did not, however, differ significantly in appearance or public perception from the bulk of the line infantry of the British Army. In 1881, the introduction of the Cardwell system of reforms provided the opportunity to adopt a modified form of Scottish dress for the Lowland regiments. Comprising doublets and tartan trews this gave the Lowlanders a distinctive identity, separate from their English, Welsh, Irish and Highland counterparts. At the same time, the absence of kilts (except for pipers) and the substitution of Kilmarnock bonnets for feather bonnets prevented confusion between Lowlanders and their Highland counterparts. The Cameronians (Scottish Rifles) was created at the same time from the merging of two existing numbered regiments.

=== Highland regiments ===
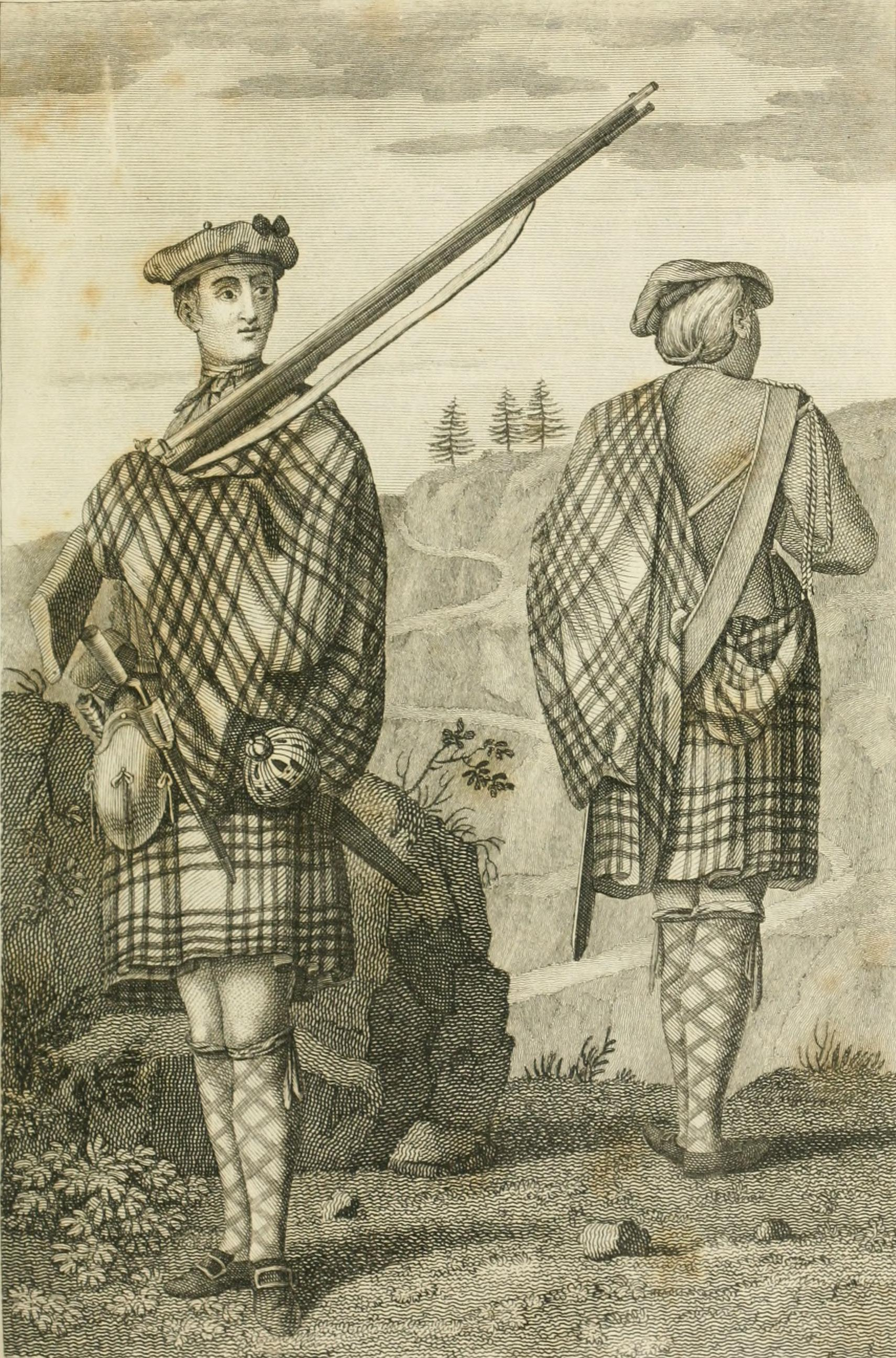
Depiction of a Highland soldier in 1801.

From 1739 to 1800 some fifty nine Highland regiments were raised. The original Highland regiments were raised in the 18th century with the object of recruiting rank and file solely from the Scottish Highlands. However, due to the Highlands becoming extensively depopulated through the course of the 19th and 20th centuries, the Highland regiments of the British Army have witnessed a long-term decline in the proportion of recruits from the Highlands and have long recruited many Lowland Scots and others. The major 20th century exceptions to this rule were the First and Second World Wars, when many Highland men joined up. Around the time that the first Highland regiments were raised the Highlands had recently been a hotbed for several revolts against the establishment, namely the Jacobite Rebellions, so the loyalties of the Highlanders were often deemed suspect in the early history of the Highland regiments.

The first Highland regiment, the Black Watch, was originally raised from clans openly loyal to the status quo in order for the government to better police the Highlands, which were deemed to be both rebellious and lawless by the contemporary British establishment. However, due to a pressing need for personnel in North America during the Seven Years' War, William Pitt the Elder made the decision to raise new Highland regiments to fight in this global conflict. The war ended in victory and among other things, Canada was secured as a part of the British Empire, while the British East India Company's position in India was consolidated and expanded, both at the expense of the French. These Highland regiments were disbanded after the war, but other Highland regiments were raised later and, like the rest of the British Army, saw service in various wars including in the Napoleonic Wars.

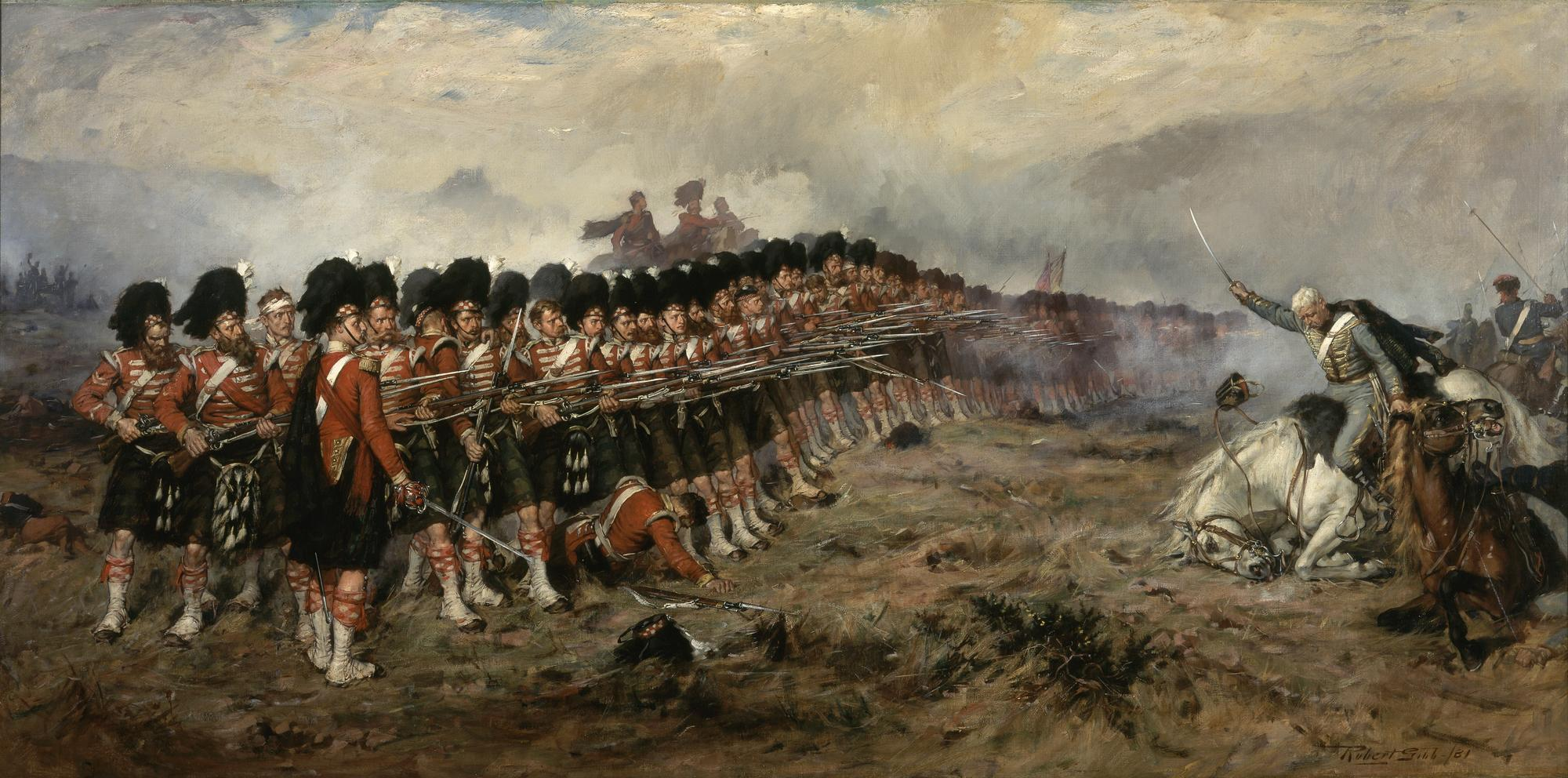
Depiction of The Thin Red Line at the Battle of Balaclava. Highland regiments played a conspicuous role in conflicts throughout the Victorian era.

By the Victorian era, the loyalty of the Highlanders was no longer suspect. Queen Victoria had a personal interest in things Scottish, in particular relating to the Highlands. In addition, Highland regiments had played a conspicuous role in such Victorian conflicts as the Crimean War and the putting down of the Indian Mutiny. The Highland regiments earned a reputation which influenced the mindset of those Scottish regiments which were Lowland in origin. This resulted in the wearing of tartan by Lowland regiments which had previously worn uniforms not clearly distinguishable from their Irish, Welsh and English counterparts. In the case of the Highland Light Infantry, the distinction between Highlanders and Lowlanders was slightly blurred: although classified as a non-kilted Highland regiment it was recruited from Glasgow in Lowland Scotland and bore the title of "City of Glasgow Regiment".

Scottish bagpipes have been adopted in a number of countries, largely in imitation of the pipers of Highland regiments which served throughout the British Empire. Highland regiments were raised in a number of Commonwealth armies, often adopting formal honorary affiliations with Scottish regiments of the British Army.

=== 19th and 20th centuries ===
By 1878 army regiments had been reformed, with nineteen nominally Scottish regiments, four of them with two battalions each. The Scottish regiments, along with their Scottish soldiers accompanied missionaries, merchants and engineers in imperial service, serving throughout the British Empire in the Victorian and Edwardian periods. Imperial service in a Scottish regiment became an outlet for many working class soldiers and for the upper classes as professional officers, often seeking fortune and employment outside the British Isles after their time in the regiment.

In 1942, a "Highland Regiment" and "Lowland Regiment" were formed as administrative units from young soldier training battalions of the Black Watch, Argyll and Sutherland Highlanders, and Royal Scots. They were disbanded in 1949.

In 1959, the Royal Scots Fusiliers and the Highland Light Infantry merged to form the Royal Highland Fusiliers. In 1994, the Queen's Own Highlanders (Seaforth and Camerons) and the Gordon Highlanders were combined into The Highlanders (Seaforth, Gordons and Camerons).

=== 21st century ===
In March 2006, the remaining Scottish regiments were amalgamated into the Royal Regiment of Scotland. The new regiment combined several traditional Scottish regiments into a single regiment. It also retained the identities of its antecedent battalions with their former regiment names as subtitles, as well as their common insignia. Initially, it consisted of six regular and two territorial battalions, with some battalions later amalgamated or restructured. The formation was part of a broader restructuring of the British Army, announced in 2004 under a defence review, aiming to reduce and streamline the organisation of infantry battalions. The Royal Regiment of Scotland will celebrate its 20th anniversary in 2026.

== Scottish regiments in the United Kingdom ==
=== Current regiments in the British Army ===
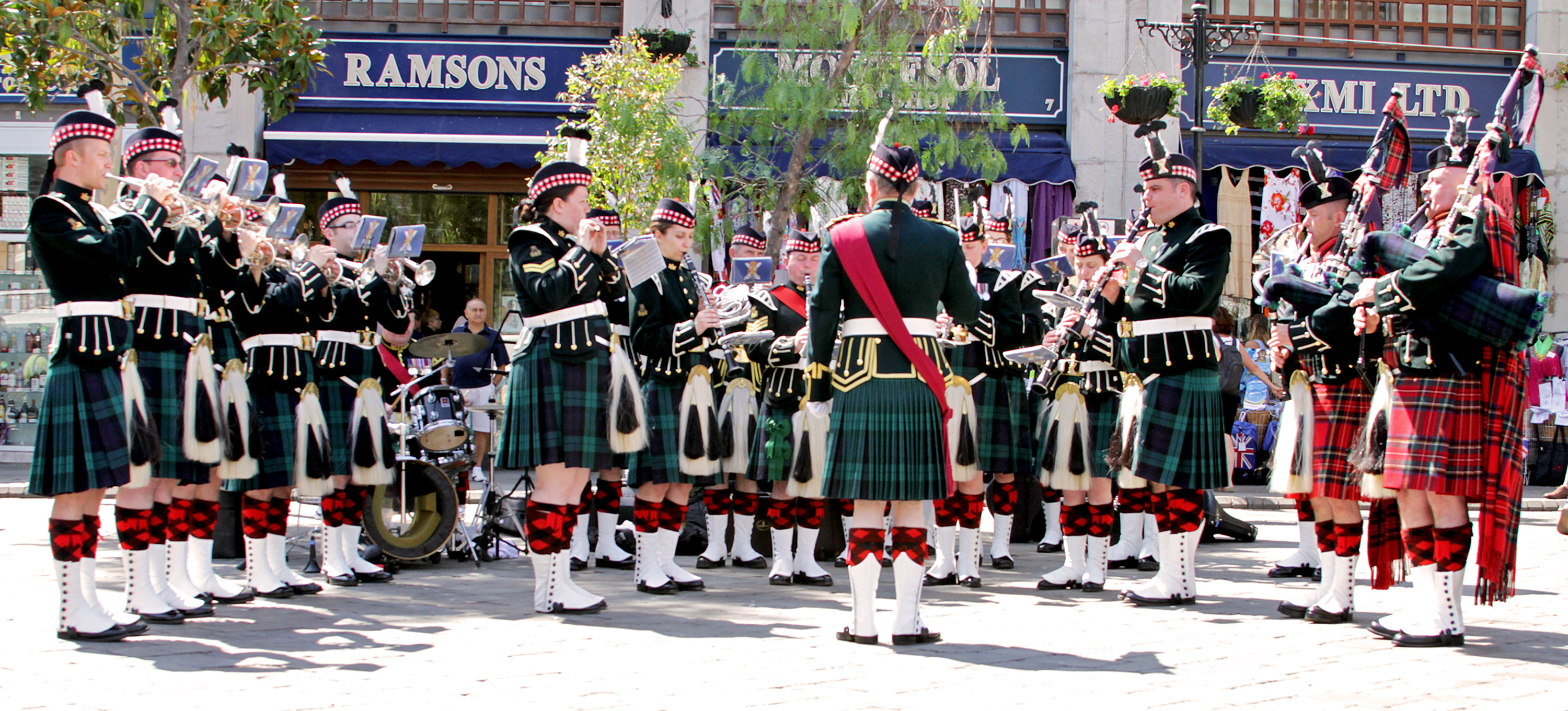
Members of the Highland Band of the Royal Regiment of Scotland performing at Gibraltar in 2013.

- Royal Scots Dragoon Guards
- Scots Guards
- Royal Regiment of Scotland
- 19th Regiment Royal Artillery
- 105th Regiment Royal Artillery
- 32 Signal Regiment
- 154 (Scottish) Regiment RLC
- G (Messines) Company, London Guards (currently the reserve company of the Scots Guards)
- 51st Highland Volunteers
- 52nd Lowland Volunteers

Additionally, the British Army also operate the Scottish and North Irish Yeomanry, consisting of:

- A (Ayrshire (Earl of Carrick's Own) Yeomanry) Squadron in Ayr
- B (North Irish Horse) Squadron in Belfast and Coleraine
- C (Fife and Forfar Yeomanry/Scottish Horse) Squadron in Cupar
- E (Lothians and Border Yeomanry) Squadron in Edinburgh

=== Former regiments in the British Army ===
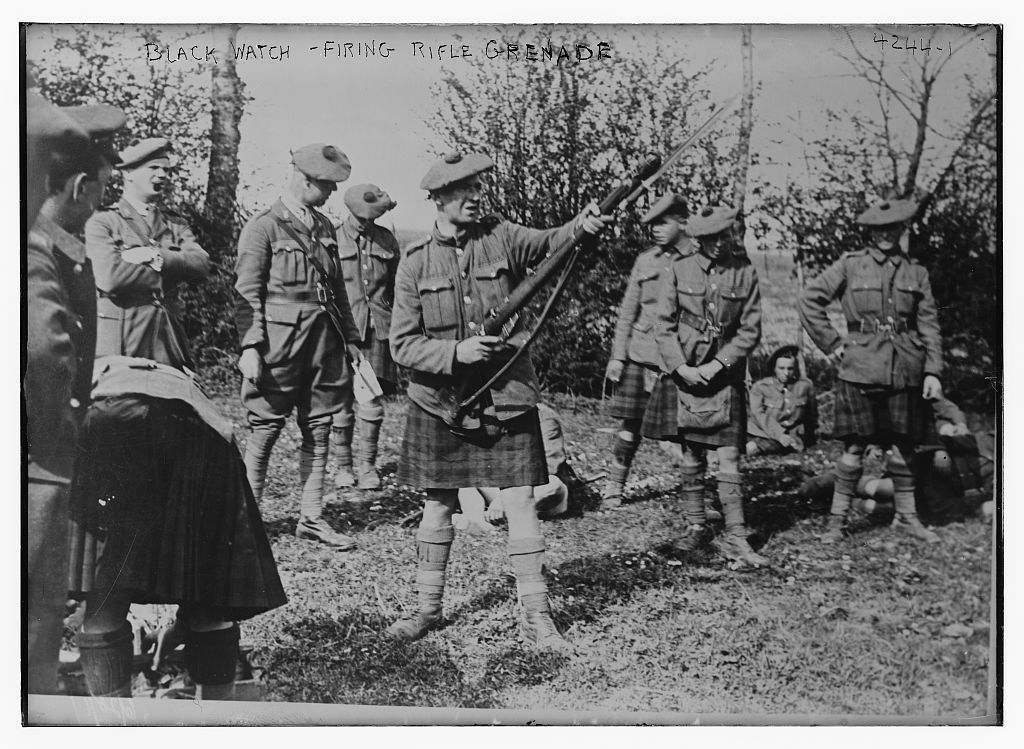
A member of the Black Watch fires a rifle grenade in 1917. In 2006, the Black Watch was reorganized into a battalion of the Royal Regiment of Scotland.

The following units were formerly a part of the British Army's Highland Brigade. The brigade was amalgamated into the Scottish Division in 1968.

- The Black Watch (Royal Highland Regiment) (1725–2006)
- The Highland Light Infantry (City of Glasgow Regiment) (1881–1959)
- The Seaforth Highlanders (Ross-shire Buffs, The Duke of Albany's) (1881–1961)
- The Gordon Highlanders (1881–1994)
- The Queen's Own Cameron Highlanders (1793–1961)
- The Argyll and Sutherland Highlanders (Princess Louise's) (1881–2006)
- The Highlanders (Seaforth, Gordons and Camerons) (1994–2006)

The following units were formerly a part of the British Army's Lowland Brigade. The brigade was amalgamated into the Scottish Division in 1968.

- The Royal Scots (The Royal Regiment) (1633–2006)
- The Royal Scots Fusiliers (1678–1959)
- The King's Own Scottish Borderers (1689–2006)
- The Cameronians (Scottish Rifles) (1881–1968)

Former yeomanry of Scotland includes:

- Ayrshire (Earl of Carrick's Own) Yeomanry
- Lothians and Border Horse
- Lanarkshire Yeomanry
- Queen's Own Royal Glasgow Yeomanry
- Fife and Forfar Yeomanry
- Lovat Scouts
- Scottish Horse
- Fife and Forfar Yeomanry/Scottish Horse
- Queen's Own Lowland Yeomanry
- Scottish Yeomanry

=== Private regiment ===
The Atholl Highlanders is a ceremonial Scottish regiment which not part of the British Army but under the command of the Duke of Atholl, based at Blair Castle. It was presented with colours by Queen Victoria in 1844, giving the regiment official status. It is the only legal private army in Europe.

== Scottish regiments in other armies ==
=== Australia ===
==== Current regiments ====
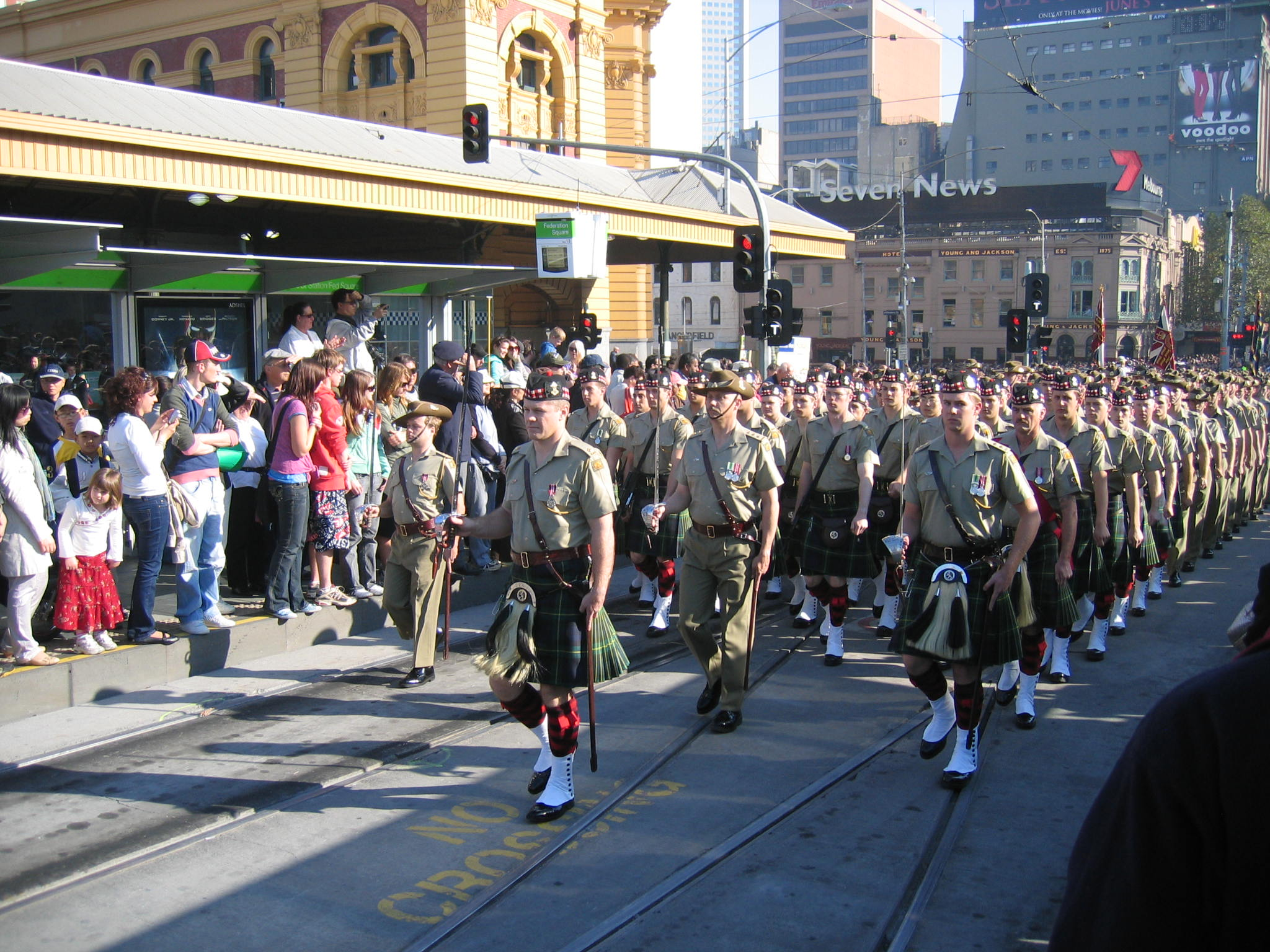
The 5th/6th Battalion, Royal Victoria Regiment is one of five Scottish battalions presently operating in the Australian Army.

There are presently five Scottish "Kilted Companies" in the Australian Army Reserve. They include:

- A Company, 2nd/17th Battalion, Royal New South Wales Regiment (Black Watch)
- B Company, 5th/6th Battalion, Royal Victoria Regiment (Gordon Highlanders)
- A Company, 10th/27th Battalion, Royal South Australia Regiment (Mackenzie Seaforth Highlanders)
- B Company, 16th Battalion, Royal Western Australia Regiment (Cameron Highlanders)
- B Company, 41st Battalion, Royal New South Wales Regiment (Argyle and Sutherland Highlanders)

==== Former regiments ====
- 30th Battalion (The New South Wales Scottish Regiment) (1915–1919; 1921–1930; 1935–1946; 1948–1960)
- 61st Battalion (The Queensland Cameron Highlanders). (1938–1946)

=== British India ===
The Auxiliary Force maintained one Scottish regiment, the Calcutta Scottish, from 1914 to 1947.

=== Canada ===
==== Current regiments ====
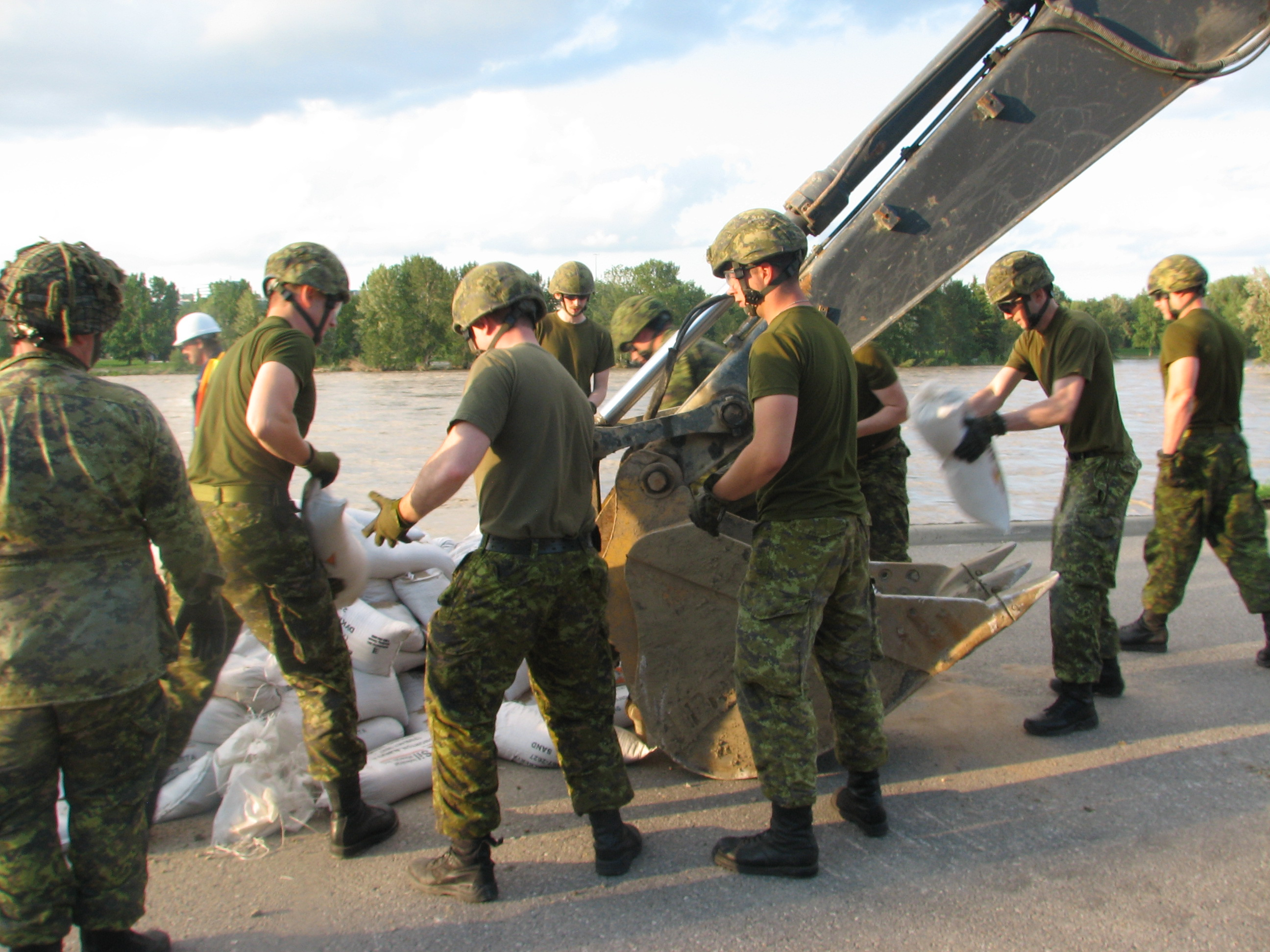
Members of the Calgary Highlanders assist in flood relief efforts during the 2013 Alberta floods

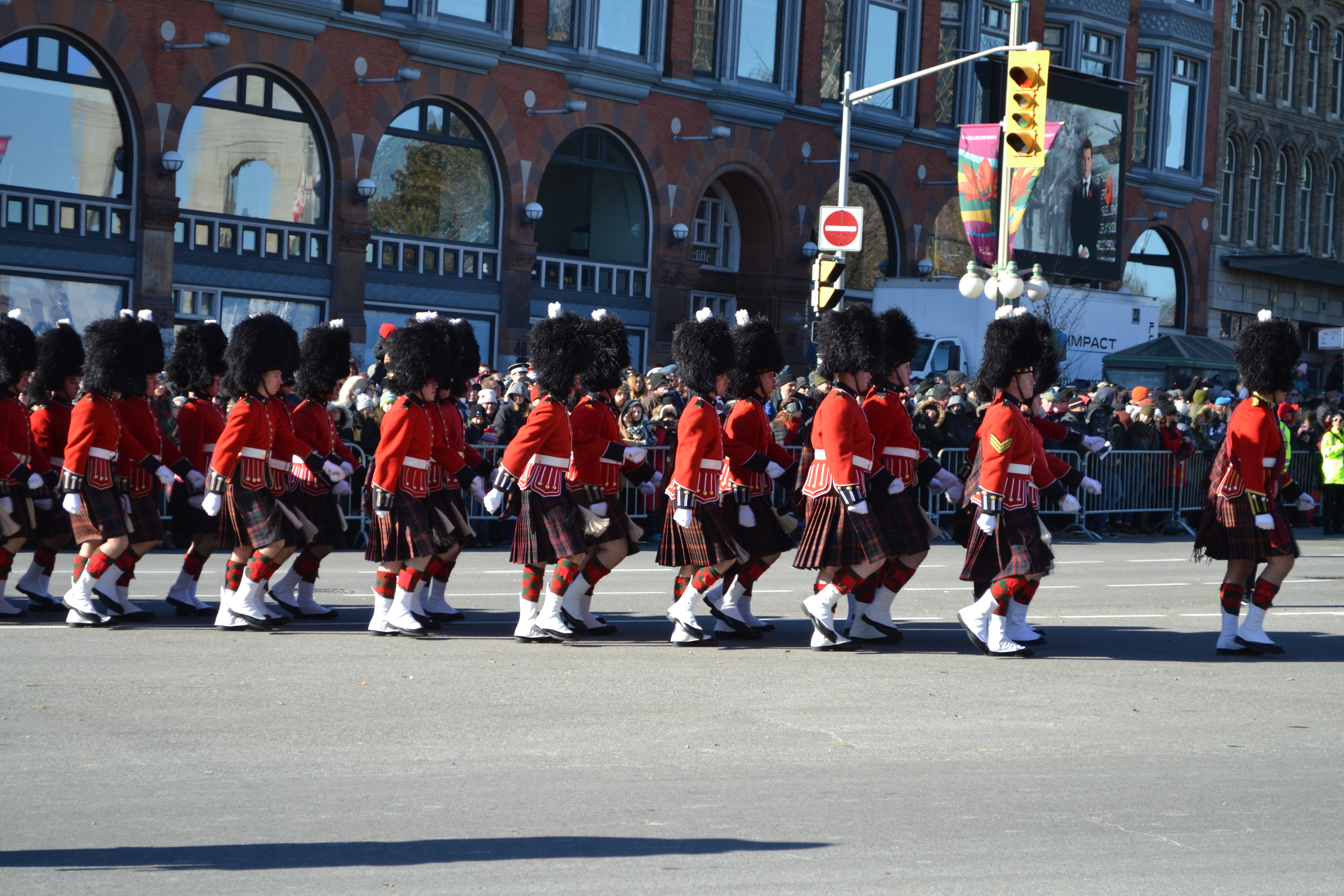
Members of the Cameron Highlanders of Ottawa march during the 2017 Remembrance Day parade

There are 16 Canadian-Scottish infantry regiments, and one Canadian-Scottish artillery regiment in Canada's Primary Reserve. The Black Watch (Royal Highland Regiment) of Canada is the senior Canadian-Scottish infantry regiment of the Canadian Army.

Canadian-Scottish regiments in the Canadian Army Reserve, in order of precedence:

- 42nd Field Artillery Regiment (Lanark and Renfrew Scottish), RCA
- The Black Watch (Royal Highland Regiment) of Canada
- The Royal Highland Fusiliers of Canada
- The Lorne Scots (Peel, Dufferin and Halton Regiment)
- The Stormont, Dundas and Glengarry Highlanders
- The Nova Scotia Highlanders
- The Cameron Highlanders of Ottawa (Duke of Edinburgh's Own)
- The Essex and Kent Scottish
- 48th Highlanders of Canada
- The Cape Breton Highlanders
- The Argyll and Sutherland Highlanders of Canada (Princess Louise's)
- The Lake Superior Scottish Regiment
- The Queen's Own Cameron Highlanders of Canada
- The Calgary Highlanders (10th Canadians)
- The Seaforth Highlanders of Canada
- The Canadian Scottish Regiment (Princess Mary's)
- The Toronto Scottish Regiment (Queen Elizabeth The Queen Mother's Own)

==== Supplementary order of battle ====
- The Perth Regiment (1866–1965)

==== Former regiments ====
- 13th Scottish Light Dragoons (1866- 1936)
- The Argyll Light Infantry (1863–1954)
- The Lorne Rifles (Scottish) (1866–1936)
- The Essex Scottish Regiment (1885–1954)
- The Highland Light Infantry of Canada (1886–1954, 1957–1965)
- The Lanark and Renfrew Scottish Regiment (1866–1946, 1959–1992)
- 50th Regiment (Gordon Highlanders of Canada) (1913–1920)
- The New Brunswick Scottish (1946–1954)
- The Pictou Highlanders (1871- 1954)
- The North Nova Scotia Highlanders (1936–1954)
- The Prince Edward Island Highlanders (1875–1946)
- The Cumberland Highlanders (1871–1936)
- The Scots Fusiliers of Canada (1914–1965)

=== New Zealand ===
The New Zealand Army formerly included the New Zealand Scottish Regiment. Initially raised as an infantry regiment in January 1939, it was later converted into an armoured unit of the Royal New Zealand Armoured Corps. The unit was formally disbanded on 16 April 2016.

=== South Africa ===
==== Current regiments ====
The South African Army has maintained several Scottish regiments with the South African Army Infantry Formation. All regiments are reserve units of the South African Army. In 2019, a number of reserve units, including the Scottish regiments, were renamed in an effort to better reflect "the military traditions and history of indigenous African military formations". These regiments include:

- Chief Makhanda Regiment (First City Regiment)
- Cape Town Highlanders Regiment
- Solomon Mahlangu Regiment (Transvaal Scottish Regiment)
- Bambatha Rifles (Witwatersrand Rifles)

==== Former regiments ====
- Pretoria Highlanders (1939–2017)

=== United States ===
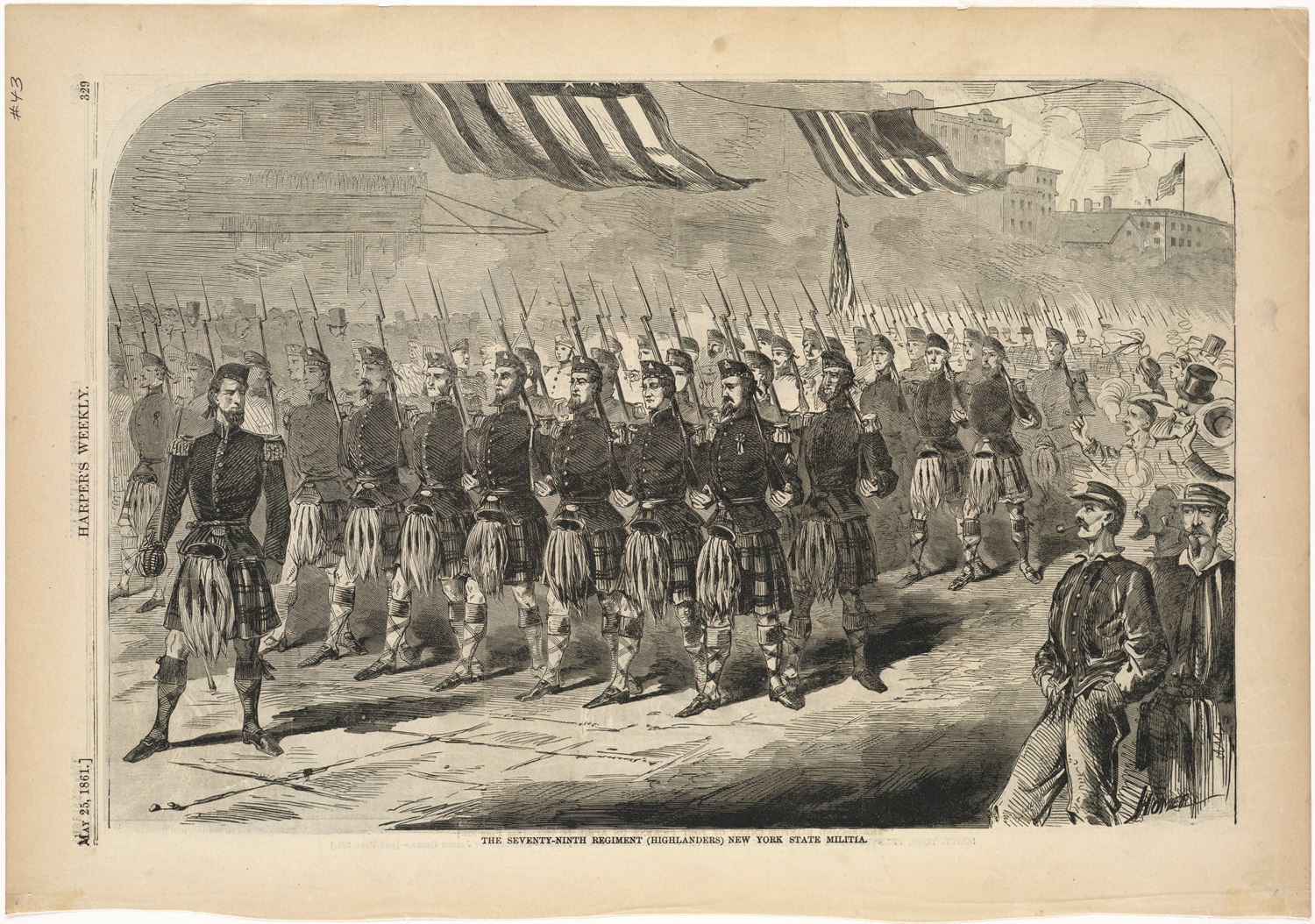
79th New York Volunteer Infantry was one of two Scottish regiments maintained by the Union army during the American Civil War.

The United States Army (or the Union army during the American Civil War) formerly operated two Scottish regiments. One of these regiments operated as a part of the New York State Militia prior to the American Civil War. Scottish regiments formerly maintained by the United States Army include:

- 12th Illinois Infantry Regiment (1861–1865)
- 79th New York Volunteer Infantry (1858–1876)

== See also ==
- Military of Scotland
- Garde Écossaise
