= 118th (North Waterloo) Battalion, CEF =

118th (North Waterloo) Battalion
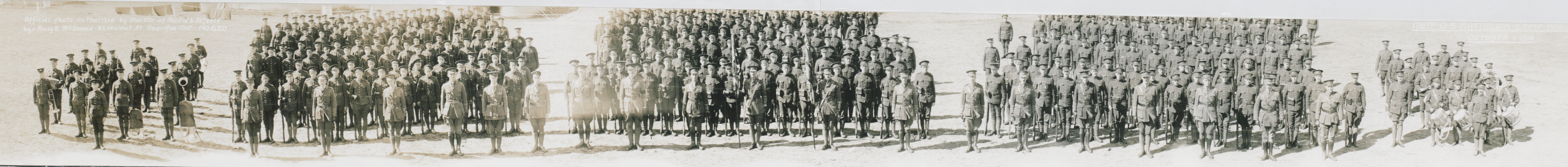
- 118th O.S. Battalion at Camp Borden on October 1, 1916.
- Active: 1915–1917
- Country: Canada
- Branch: Canadian Army
- Garrison/HQ: Berlin, Ontario (since renamed Kitchener)
- Engagements: World War I

The 118th (North Waterloo) Battalion, CEF was a unit in the Canadian Expeditionary Force during the First World War.

In the early months of the war, Canadians rushed to enlist for various reasons - patriotism, adventure, and to oppose German hostility. Battalions were quickly filled and local communities were proud of their enlisted men. But as the war progressed Canadian recruitment numbers declined. By 1916, all Canadian battalions, not just the local 118th and 111th, were faced with enlistment challenges. Overseas casualties increased and Canadians began to realize the war would not end soon. As the war progressed and Waterloo County came under more scrutiny, Waterloo North Member of Parliament William Weichel proposed to Sir Sam Hughes, the Canadian Minister of Militia and Defence, that Waterloo County could raise two overseas battalions. Colonel A.J. Oliver, commander of the 34th Battalion in nearby Guelph, was one of the few who opposed this idea, realizing that it would be a very difficult undertaking. Hughes agreed and in December 1915 the creation of two infantry battalions was authorized - one based in Berlin and one in Galt.

Based in Berlin, Ontario, which as a result of a 1916 referendum would rename itself Kitchener, the unit began recruiting in late 1915 in the northern portion of Waterloo County. After sailing to England in January 1917, the battalion was absorbed into the 25th Reserve Battalion on February 6, 1917.

The 118th (North Waterloo) Battalion, CEF had one Officer Commanding: Lieutenant Colonel William Merton Overton Lochead.

The battalion is perpetuated by The Royal Highland Fusiliers of Canada.

== History ==
Waterloo County's first militia unit, the 29th Waterloo Battalion of Infantry, was formed in 1866. The battalion's headquarters was in Berlin, with six companies located throughout the County. In 1900 the battalion was reorganized as the 29th Waterloo Regiment of Infantry and its headquarters were moved to nearby Galt. Not to be outdone, Berlin's citizens campaigned for a city regiment of their own. It was not until the outbreak of the First World War in August 1914 that Berlin was finally allowed to form a city militia regiment: the 108th. Neither the 29th nor the 108th were authorized to go overseas to fight in Europe. Instead, they encouraged recruits to join the newly created Canadian Expeditionary Force battalions, in particular the 34th being raised in Guelph, and the 71st in Woodstock. In March 1915, Galt's Colonel Andrew Oliver of the 29th Regiment was made the commander of the 34th Battalion in Guelph. Oliver had 19 years of military experience and took more than 140 men from Galt with him to join the 34th. He was the most experienced military leader in Waterloo County at the time.

The First World War created conflict among the citizens of Waterloo County. Not only were residents divided by ethnicity - German and British - but longstanding civic rivalries between Berlin (now Kitchener) and Galt (now Cambridge) increased the tension. This friction resulted in Waterloo Country attempting to raise two overseas battalions - the 118th in North Waterloo based in Berlin, and the 111th South Waterloo stationed in Galt.

=== Recruitment tactics ===
Both the 118th and 111th Battalions and local citizens' recruiting committees used various methods to attract new recruits: speeches and recruitment rallies were frequently held at local movie theatres; military parades and drills were held in public areas in the hope that civilians would be inspired to enlist; posters were hung throughout each recruitment area; ads and articles were run in local newspapers, and recruiters visited homes, work places and local businesses to encourage individuals to enlist. When none of that proved successful, aggressive tactics were used. Members of the 118th were known for harassing civilians on the street and for dragging men unwillingly to the local recruiting office, ultimately harming recruitment. Members of the Twin Cities Trade and Labour Council were so outraged by the actions of the 118th that in early 1916 they passed a resolution requesting that Berlin City Council stop payments to the recruitment fund. They also demanded that if the tax-payers are insulted, molested and interfered with in future, that Major General Sir Sam Hughes be requested to remove the 118th Battalion from Waterloo County.

The 118th Battalion faced low enlistment rates because good paying factory jobs in Berlin and Waterloo were plentiful, and men did not want to give them up. Part of the battalion's recruitment area was rural, and farmers were essential to the war effort. A large population of Mennonites opposed to the war also lived in the recruitment district. Recruitment occurred in competition with other local units: the 111th, the 34th and the 71st Battalions. Yet, Lieutenant-Colonel Lochead managed to enlist about 700 men.

After the 118th arrived in Carling Heights in London, Ontario, in May, 1916, further problems arose. Instead of proceeding overseas as expected, the soldiers of the 118th spent the summer of 1916 training at the newly built Camp Borden, just South-West of Barrie. In August, around half of the 118th's soldiers disappeared on "harvest furloughs". 92 of them did not return, and were classified as deserters. In September, 12 officers resigned from the 118th and the battalion was reduced from four to two companies - around 540 men. With more than 800 men, the 111th Battalion was moved overseas in September 1916. The 118th Battalion was sent overseas in January, 1917.

=== Hostility toward 118th Battalion soldiers in Berlin, Ontario, 1916-17 ===
Clashes between local citizens and soldiers in the 118th Battalion increased in early 1916. While recruiting in Berlin during early 1916, the 118th Battalion created problems for local citizens and city council. Local businesses and homes were vandalized, a policeman was injured and the mayor was assaulted. In February and March 1916, numerous soldiers of the 118th, plus a few civilians, held a series of raids in Berlin and Waterloo. Their targets were local businesses - Schultz's shoe repair, Ritzer's tailor shop and Doersam's bookstore, that had German-made items on display. A portrait of Kaiser Wilhelm I was "captured" at Schultz's store. It was later smashed over the head of a local civilian who protested the soldiers' actions. The homes of civilians were also broken into, with property destroyed by members of the 118th. Julius Luft received a letter of apology from Lieutenant-Colonel Lochead for the "unbecoming manner" is which his soldiers behaved after they broke into Luft's home. Four incidents in particular increased tensions in the city and created hostility toward the soldiers.

1) Rev. Tappert: On March 5, 1916, Reverend C. Reinhold Tappert was dragged from his home and beaten by a group of soldiers from the 118th Battalion. Tappert, an American, was the pastor at Berlin's St. Matthew's Lutheran Church. His numerous pro-German remarks - "I am not ashamed to confess that I love the land of my fathers - Germany" - caused a great uproar in the city. Two soldiers, Sergeant Major Granville Blood and Private Schaefer - received suspended sentences for the assault. Tappert resigned from St. Matthew's and returned to the United States. During the first few months of the war, services and activities at Lutheran churches in Waterloo County continued on as they always had. However, as anti-German sentiment increased throughout Waterloo County, many of the churches decided to stop holding services in German.

2) The Concordia Raid: The Condordia Singing Society was founded as a choral group in 1873 by German immigrants. The group was instrumental in organizing the Sangerfests or singing festivals for which Waterloo County had become famous in the late 1800s. In May 1915, members of the Concordia Club unanimously decided to close their doors for the duration of WWI. Stored in their hall was the bust of Kaiser Wilhelm I which had been retrieved after being thrown in the lake at Victoria Park in August, 1914. On the evening of February 15, 1916, members of the 118th Battalion broke into the club, stole the bust and smashed many of the club's possessions. Furniture, German flags, sheet music and pictures were all destroyed in a large bonfire on the street. On February 16, 1916, members of the 118th stole the medallions from the base of the Peace Monument in Victoria Park, where the bust of Kaiser Wilhelm I had previously been.

3) Waterloo's Acadian Club: During the summer of 1916, the 118th soldiers were at it again. After a recruiting rally held in Waterloo's town square, about 30 members of the battalion broke into the Acadian Club on King Street in Waterloo. The Acadian was a social club for single and married men of German background. Once again, the club's possessions were damaged or destroyed. Club president, Norman Zick, seemed particularly shocked - by July 1916 roughly half of the club's members had already enlisted, many in the 118th. He also stated that the Club, since the beginning of the war has been very patriotic, always welcoming soldiers in their midst, and never giving cause for offense to anyone.

Both raids on these local German clubs were investigated by military authorities. The clubs asked for damages - around $300 in each case - to be paid by the army. The court found that the Concordia club had not been closed as claimed and that conditions were allowed to prevail in Berlin that loyal British citizens found impossible to tolerate. It concluded that since both soldiers and civilians were equally responsible for damages, members of the 118th who participated in the raid would not be charged. The Acadian club did not receive much better news. The court found that the 118th soldiers were responsible for the damage but that the battalion should not pay in case further ill-feeling might be engendered. The bill for the damages was ultimately sent to the Department of Justice who replied that the claim cannot be entertained. Similar claims in Calgary, Winnipeg and others were also not entertained, as the Minister of Justice viewed that there is no legal responsibility on the part of the Crown.

4) The final incident involving members of the 118th occurred during the newly named Kitchener municipal election held on January 1, 1917. The majority of the newly elected council had been opposed to the Berlin to Kitchener name change, and rumours spread that they would try to change "Kitchener" back to "Berlin". As a matter of patriotism, soldiers from the 118th championed the changing of Berlin to a new name. Soldiers from the 118th were in the city on Christmas leave during the election and did not take kindly to the rumour of reverting to the name Berlin. A riot broke out, led by Sergeant Major Blood. The Berlin News Record newspaper office was broken into and damaged. Two aldermen-elect - Nicholas Asmussen and H.M. Bowman - were beaten up. Members of the battalion were allegedly hunting for the new mayor, David Gross, throughout the city. Around 100 men from the 122nd Battalion stationed in Galt quickly arrived and stopped the riot. They escorted the 118th soldiers to the train station and remained on guard in Kitchener for the next few days as calm eventually returned.

Even the local police had to be wary when dealing with the soldiers of the 118th. Police Constable Jim Blevins appeared at the barracks to serve a summons to Private Meinzinger for his assault on another citizen. Meinzinger punched Blevins, and rumours circulated that the policeman was not expected to live on account of a broken jaw bone. Blevins did survive; Meinzinger was charged and sentenced to 18 months in jail. Because of these and other incidents that occurred in Berlin, Mayor John Hett asked for a military investigation into the conduct of the 118th Battalion. This action made Mayor Hett very unpopular with the soldiers and with some city Councillors. The mayor was encouraged to avoid attending any rallies or other public engagements that involved the 118th Battalion. The soldiers did get their revenge by throwing sugar beets at Mayor Hett at the Kitchener train station. Two unidentified residents apparently had enough of the 118ths actions. On the evening of March 12, 1916, they took a shot at sentry Private J. Rich. The shot missed the private and the shooter took off in a waiting sleigh with another man. According to the city's Berlin News Record, everything possible is being done to run the thugs to earth.

Not all interactions between the 118th soldiers and local citizens were negative. School children often visited the barracks and gave the soldiers oranges and eggs (Courtesy of the Mennonite Archives of Ontario/Gordon C. Eby Fonds).

=== The 118th in England, 1917 ===
The 118th left for England in January, 1917. By all accounts, the voyage was uncomfortable, the food was awful and many soldiers suffered from seasickness. The threat from German U-boats - submarines - was a constant reminder of the dangers the soldiers were about to face. Beginning in 1917, Allied ships were painted with dazzle camouflage. Dazzle was designed to confuse the enemy about the size, shape and speed of the ship. Once in England, all new arrivals received a week's leave and a railway pass. Many chose to visit relatives in England while others used the time to visit London's various attractions.

Once leave was over, the battalion was ready to complete its training. Poor barrack conditions, particularly the food, and strict British military discipline was a shock to the Canadian troops. Very few who enlisted in the CEF expected their battalions to be broken up and transferred to other units already in France and Belgium. This became common practice in late 1916, making the soldiers uneasy and negatively affecting morale. Of the more than 250 infantry battalions formed in Canada, only about 50 served in France, continually reinforced with soldiers from units newly arrived in England. Galt's 111th briefly served as a unit before being transferred to the 35th Reserve Battalion. The 118th never served as a group and the soldiers became part of the 25th Reserve Battalion in February, 1917. As such, Waterloo County soldiers were spread throughout various CEF units for the duration of the war.

== Bibliography ==
- Meek, John F. (1971). Over the Top! The Canadian Infantry in the First World War. Orangeville, Ont.
