= 31 Canadian Brigade Group =

Brigade of the Canadian Army

31st (Reserve) Brigade Group; 31 Canadian Brigade Group
- Brigade group badge
- Active: 1 April 1942–8 June 1946; 1 April 1997–present
- Country: Canada
- Branch: Canadian Army
- Type: Headquarters
- Part of: 2nd Canadian Division
- Garrison/HQ: Wolseley Barracks, London, Ontario
- Mottos: Pro aris et focis (Latin for 'for hearth and home')
- Website: www.canada.ca/en/army/corporate/4-canadian-division/31-canadian-brigade-group.html

Insignia
NATO Map Symbol
31 CBG
2 Cdn Div

31 Canadian Brigade Group (31 CBG; French: 31^{e} Groupe-brigade du Canada) is part of the 2nd Canadian Division, under the Canadian Army. It encompasses the southwestern portion of Ontario, and is headquartered in London, Ontario. The 31 CBG area of responsibility stretches from Hamilton to Windsor. The brigade has approximately 2,400 soldiers. Colonel Blair Ashford, CD is Commander of 31 Canadian Brigade Group. The brigade sergeant-major is Chief Warrant Officer Tracy Sharp, CD

== History ==
=== Second World War ===
31st (Reserve) Brigade Group was created, within 1 Militia District, on 1 April 1942 when the reserve force in Canada was reorganized for the war. Like today, the formation consisted of part-time soldiers who were paraded and trained on evenings and weekends. The brigade group was closed down on 28 November 1945 and the headquarters itself closed on 8 June 1946. During its existence, the brigade group was headquartered in London, Ontario and it held the following organization:

- Canadian Infantry Corps
  - 1st (Reserve) Battalion, The Middlesex and Huron Regiment
  - 2nd (Reserve) Battalion, The Canadian Fusiliers (City of London Regiment) MG
  - 2nd (Reserve) Battalion, The Essex Scottish Regiment
  - 2nd (Reserve) Battalion, The Scots Fusiliers of Canada
- Canadian Armoured Corps
  - 30th (Reserve) Reconnaissance Regiment (Essex Regiment (Tank))
- Royal Canadian Artillery
  - 31st (Reserve) Field Regiment, RCA
- Royal Canadian Engineers
  - 7th/11th (Reserve) Field Company, RCE
- Royal Canadian Army Service Corps
  - Brigade Group Company, 1st (Reserve) Divisional, RCASC
- Royal Canadian Army Medical Corps
  - 24th (Reserve) Field Ambulance, RCAMC
- Royal Canadian Corps of Signals
  - E and J sections, No.1 (Reserve) District Signals, RCCS
- Royal Canadian Ordnance Corps / Royal Canadian Electrical and Mechanical Engineers
  - No.2 Group,
  - No.2 (Reserve) Divisional Workshop, (RCOC) RCEME
  - No.1 (Reserve) Light Aid Detachment (Type A), (RCOC) RCEME
  - No.2 (Reserve) Light Aid Detachment (Type B), (RCOC) RCEME
  - No.3 (Reserve) Light Aid Detachment (Type B), (RCOC) RCEME
  - No.4 (Reserve) Light Aid Detachment (Type B), (RCOC) RCEME

=== 1997 to Present ===
31 Canadian Brigade Group (CBG) was recreated on 1 April 1997, with its headquarters located in London, replacing the London Militia District (LMD). Resulting from a major restructuring of the army, it was established as one of ten reserve brigade groups organized across Canada.

== Brigade composition ==
=== Overview ===
31 CBG is an infantry-focused reserve brigade comprising 13 units in addition to the brigade headquarters in London. These units are spread out over southern and south-western Ontario, in London, Sarnia, Windsor, Guelph, Hamilton, St. Thomas, St. Catherines, Waterloo, Burlington, Stratford, Cambridge, Kitchener, and Chatham. The Royal Highland Fusiliers of Canada provide a mortar platoon to 31 CBG, along with performing their light infantry duties.

=== Units ===
Cities with 31 CBG units

| Unit | Branch | Location |
|---|---|---|
| 31 Canadian Brigade Group Headquarters | Headquarters | London, Ontario |
| 1st Hussars | Armoured reconnaissance | London and Sarnia |
| The Windsor Regiment (RCAC) | Armoured reconnaissance | Windsor |
| 11th Field Artillery Regiment, RCA | Artillery | Guelph and Hamilton |
| 56th Field Artillery Regiment, RCA | Artillery | Brantford, St Catharines, and Simcoe |
| 31 Combat Engineer Regiment (The Elgins) | Engineer | St. Thomas and Waterloo |
| 31 Signal Regiment | Communications | Hamilton and London |
| The Royal Hamilton Light Infantry (Wentworth Regiment) | Infantry | Hamilton and Burlington |
| The Lincoln and Welland Regiment | Infantry | St. Catharines |
| 4th Battalion, The Royal Canadian Regiment | Infantry | London and Stratford |
| The Royal Highland Fusiliers of Canada | Infantry (mortar) | Cambridge and Kitchener |
| The Essex and Kent Scottish | Infantry | Windsor and Chatham |
| The Argyll and Sutherland Highlanders of Canada (Princess Louise's) | Infantry | Hamilton |
| 31 Service Battalion | Combat service support | Hamilton, London, and Windsor |

== See also ==
- List of armouries in Canada
- Military history of Canada
- History of the Canadian Army
- Canadian Armed Forces
