= Canadian-Scottish regiment =

Type of regiment in the Canadian Army

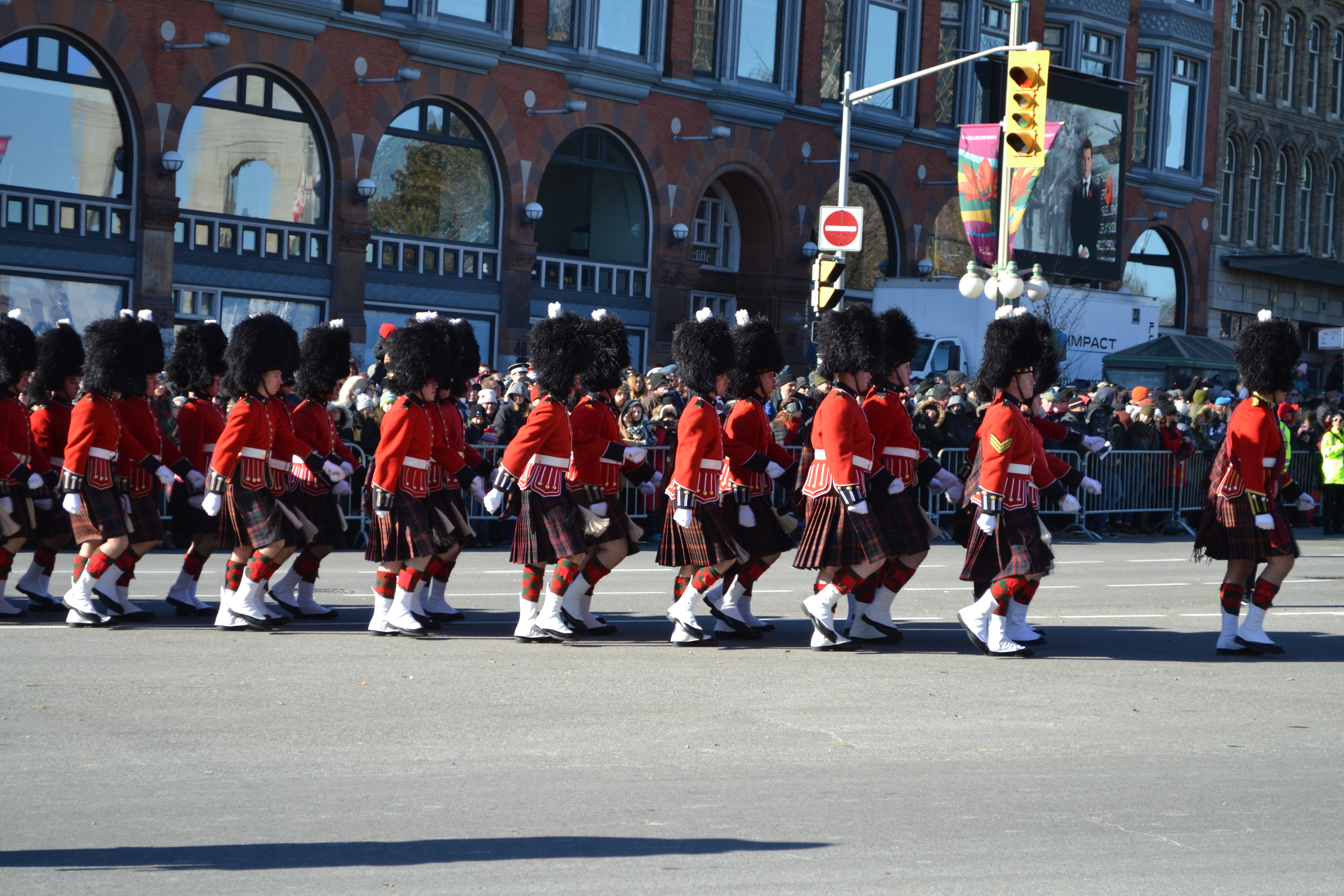
Members of the Cameron Highlanders of Ottawa during a Remembrance Day parade in 2017

Canadian-Scottish regiments are regiments in the Canadian Army that maintain the traditions and style of dress used by Scottish regiments. Although these units maintain Scottish dress and traditions, recruitment for these units is open to all Canadians.

"Lord Dundonald, Speaking at the annual gathering of the Scottish Clans Association in London, said that while commanding the forces in Canada he had succeeded in changing the uniforms of several regiments, and dressing them in the Highland garb. Lord Dundonald is Closely associated with the Clan Mackinnon, his mother being a native of that clan."

— Inverness Courier - Friday 30 November 1906

The Canadian Army maintains sixteen Canadian-Scottish infantry regiments, and one Canadian-Scottish artillery regiment. All Canadian-Scottish infantry regiments form a part of the Canadian Army Reserve. In addition to active units, there also exists one Canadian-Scottish regiment in the Canadian Army's Supplementary Order of Battle.

== Current regiments ==
=== The Royal Regiment of Canadian Artillery ===
- 42nd Field Regiment (Lanark and Renfrew Scottish), RCA

=== Royal Canadian Infantry Corps ===
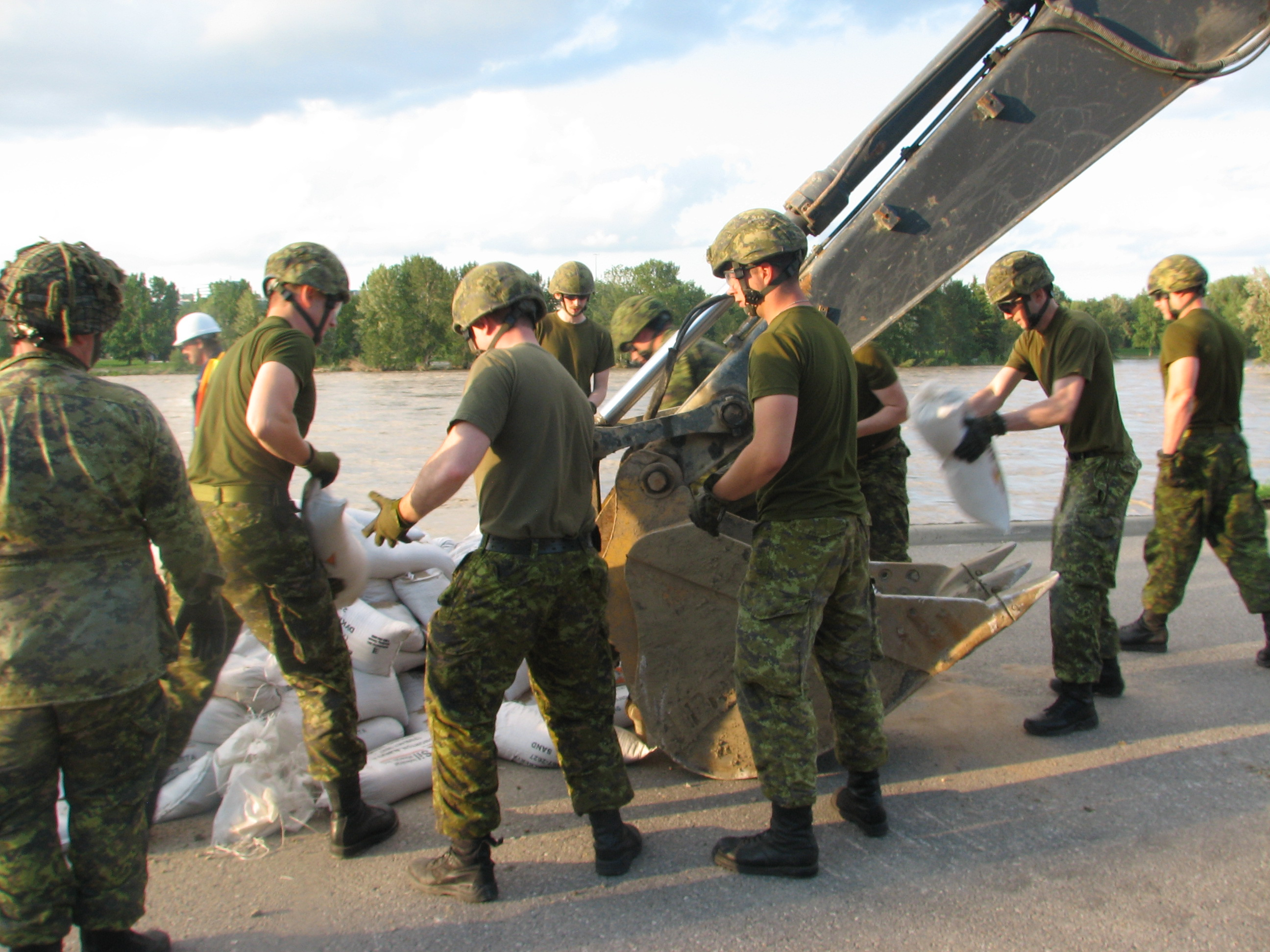
The Calgary Highlanders assist with flood relief efforts during the 2013 Alberta floods.

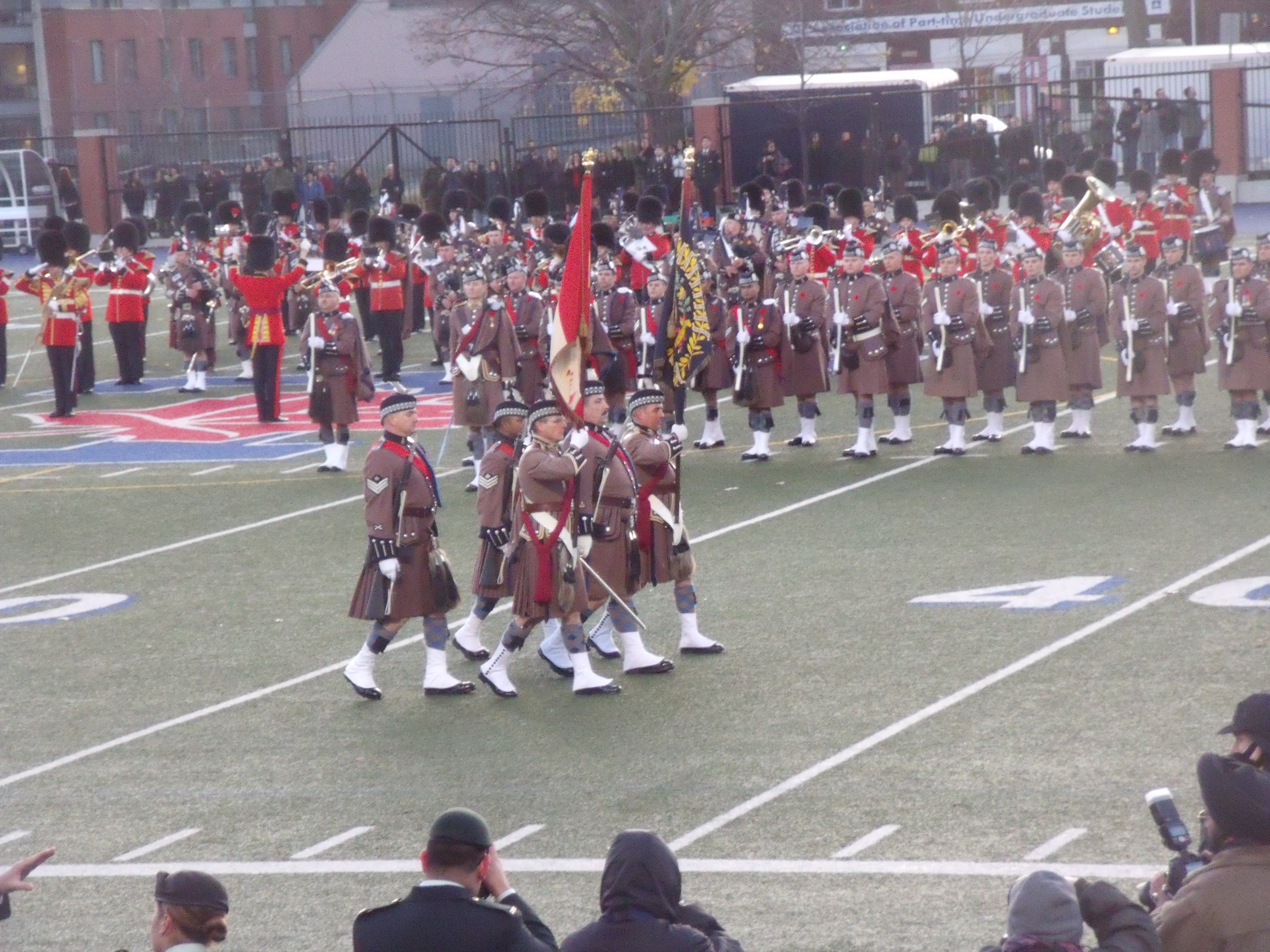
The Toronto Scottish Regiment (Queen Elizabeth The Queen Mother's Own) during the Presentation of Colours

The Royal Canadian Infantry Corps maintains 16 Scottish regiments.

Units are listed in order of precedence:

1. The Black Watch (Royal Highland Regiment) of Canada
2. The Royal Highland Fusiliers of Canada
3. The Lorne Scots (Peel, Dufferin and Halton Regiment)
4. Stormont, Dundas and Glengarry Highlanders
5. The Nova Scotia Highlanders
6. Cameron Highlanders of Ottawa
7. The Essex and Kent Scottish
8. 48th Highlanders of Canada
9. The Cape Breton Highlanders
10. The Argyll and Sutherland Highlanders of Canada (Princess Louise's)
11. The Lake Superior Scottish Regiment
12. Queen's Own Cameron Highlanders of Canada
13. The Calgary Highlanders (10th Canadians)
14. The Seaforth Highlanders of Canada
15. The Canadian Scottish Regiment (Princess Mary's)
16. The Toronto Scottish Regiment (Queen Elizabeth the Queen Mother's Own)

=== Supplementary Order of Battle ===
1. The Perth Regiment

== Former regiments ==
=== Cavalry ===
- 13th Scottish Light Dragoons (1866–1936)

=== Infantry ===
Units are listed in order of precedence:

1. The Argyll Light Infantry (1863–1954)
2. The Lorne Rifles (Scottish) (1866–1936)
3. The Essex Scottish Regiment (1885–1954)
4. The Highland Light Infantry of Canada (1886–1954, 1957–1965)
5. The Lanark and Renfrew Scottish Regiment (1866–1946, 1959–1992)
6. 50th Regiment (Gordon Highlanders of Canada) (1913–1920)
7. The New Brunswick Scottish (1946–1954)
8. The Pictou Highlanders (1871–1954)
9. The North Nova Scotia Highlanders (1936–1954)
10. The Prince Edward Island Highlanders (1875–1946)
11. The Cumberland Highlanders (1871–1936)
12. The Scots Fusiliers of Canada (1914–1965)

== See also ==
- Canadian pipers in World War I
- History of the Canadian Army
- Scottish Canadians
