= Windsor Regiment =

The Windsor Regiment (RCAC)
- Regimental badge
- Active: 1936–present
- Country: Canada
- Branch: Primary Reserve
- Type: Armoured cavalry
- Role: Armoured warfare
- Size: One regiment
- Part of: 31 Canadian Brigade Group
- Garrison/HQ: Windsor, Ontario
- Nickname: Windsors
- Motto: Semper paratus (Latin for 'always prepared')
- March: "My Boy Willie"
- Anniversaries: 15 December 1936
- Engagements: Second World War; War in Afghanistan
- Battle honours: Afghanistan

Commanders
- Commanding Officer: LCol Wayne Finkle
- Regimental Sergeant Major: CWO Wilson
- Honorary Colonel: Elizabeth Bainbridge (Col Rtd)
- Patron: Mr Don Hearn Snr

Insignia
- NATO Map Symbol
- Abbreviation: WINDSOR R

The Windsor Regiment (RCAC) is a Primary Reserve armoured regiment of the Canadian Army, based in Windsor, Ontario, and is part of the 2nd Canadian Division's 31 Canadian Brigade Group.

Founded in 1936 as the Essex Regiment (Tank), the regiment exercised freedom of the city of Windsor on 24 October 2026 as part of its 90th anniversary commemorations.

== Lineage ==
=== The Windsor Regiment (RCAC) ===
The Windsor Regiment (RCAC) originated in Windsor, Ontario, on 15 December 1936 as The Essex Regiment (Tank), named after Essex County. It was redesignated as the 30th (Reserve) Reconnaissance Battalion (Essex Regiment) on 27 January 1942; as the 30th (Reserve) Reconnaissance Regiment (Essex Regiment), CAC on 8 June 1942; as the 30th (Reserve) Reconnaissance Regiment (Essex Regiment), RCAC on 2 August 1945; as the 22nd Reconnaissance Regiment (Essex Regiment), RCAC on 1 April 1946; as The Windsor Regiment (22nd Reconnaissance Regiment) on 4 February 1949; as The Windsor Regiment (22nd Armoured Regiment) on 1 October 1954; as The Windsor Regiment (RCAC) on 19 May 1958; as The Windsor Regiment on 19 September 1985. On 14 August 1997 the regiment reverted to its previous designation as The Windsor Regiment (RCAC).

=== Lineage chart ===
Lineage chart

1936	The Essex Regt (Tank)
1942	30th Recce Bn (The Essex Regt), CAC, CASF	30th (Reserve) Recce Bn (Essex Regt)
1942	30th Recce Regt (The Essex Regt), CAC, CASF	30th (Reserve) Recce Regt (Essex Regt), CAC
1944	Disbanded
1945	30th (Reserve) Recce Regt (Essex Regt), RCAC
1946	22nd Recce Regt (Essex Regt), RCAC
1949	The Windsor Regt (22nd Recce Regt)
1954	The Windsor Regt (22nd Armd Regt)
1958	The Windsor Regt (RCAC)
1985	The Windsor Regt
1997	The Windsor Regt (RCAC)

== Operational history ==
=== Second World War ===
The camp flag of The Windsor Regiment (RCAC).

Details from the regiment were called out on active service for local protection duties on 28 May 1940 as The Essex Regiment (Tank), CASF (Details).

The regiment subsequently mobilized an armour regiment designated the 30th Reconnaissance Battalion (The Essex Regiment), CAC, CASF for active service on 12 May 1942. It was redesignated the 30th Reconnaissance Regiment (The Essex Regiment), CAC, CASF on 8 June 1942. It served in Canada in a home defence and training role as part of Military District No. 12. On 23 July 1943 it embarked for Britain where its soldiers were employed as assembly workers for unassembled vehicles arriving from Canada. The regiment was subsequently disbanded on 31 March 1944.

== Alliances ==
- United Kingdom - The Royal Scots Dragoon Guards (Carabiniers and Greys)

== Battle honours ==
Pre-2022 guidon

The Windsor Regiment (RCAC) was awarded its first battle honour on 9 May 2014: the theatre honour AFGHANISTAN. Elizabeth Dowdeswell, Lieutenant Governor of Ontario, presented the regiment with a new guidon that includes this battle honour on 24 September 2022.

== Media ==
- Black Beret: A History of the Windsor Regiment (RCAC), 1936-2006 by Michael R. McNorgan (Jan 2006)

== Order of precedence ==
Preceded by Le Régiment de Hull (RCAC)	The Windsor Regiment (RCAC)	Succeeded by Last in precedence of armoured regiments
