= 42nd Field Artillery Regiment (Lanark and Renfrew Scottish), RCA =

- 42^{e} Régiment d'artillerie de campagne (Lanark and Renfrew Scottish), ARC (French)
- Active: 5 October 1866–present
- Country: Canada
- Branch: Army
- Type: Field artillery
- Size: One regiment
- Part of: 33 Canadian Brigade Group
- Garrison/HQ: Pembroke, Ontario
- Mottos: Ubique (Latin for 'everywhere'); Quo fas et gloria ducunt (Latin for 'whither right and glory lead')
- March: Quick: "Highland Laddie"
- Website: canada.ca/en/army/corporate/4-canadian-division/42-field-artillery-regiment.html

The 42nd Field Artillery Regiment (Lanark and Renfrew Scottish), RCA is a Canadian Army Reserve artillery regiment based in Pembroke, Ontario. It is part of the 4th Canadian Division's 33 Canadian Brigade Group.

First organized as the 42nd Brockville Battalion of Infantry in 1866, the regiment was later relocated to Pembroke, Ontario, and redesignated as the 42nd Lanark and Renfrew Battalion of Infantry and became a Scottish regiment in 1927. The regiment was first converted to an air defence artillery regiment in 1946 but converted back to an infantry regiment in 1959. In 1992, the regiment was again converted to artillery as the 1st Air Defence Regiment (Lanark and Renfrew Scottish), RCA. It was renamed to its current title in 2011.

== Lineage ==
=== The Lanark and Renfrew Scottish Regiment ===
- Originated on 5 October 1866, in Brockville, Ontario, as the 42nd Brockville Battalion of Infantry.
- Redesignated on 1 December 1897, as the 42nd Lanark and Renfrew Battalion of Infantry.
- Redesignated on 8 May 1900, as the 42nd Lanark and Renfrew Regiment.
- Redesignated on 12 March 1920, as The Lanark and Renfrew Regiment.
- Redesignated on 15 July 1927, as The Lanark and Renfrew Scottish Regiment.
- Redesignated on 7 November 1940, as the 2nd (Reserve) Battalion, The Lanark and Renfrew Scottish Regiment.
- Redesignated on 15 September 1944, as The Lanark and Renfrew Scottish Regiment (Reserve).
- Converted to air defence artillery on 1 April 1946, and redesignated as the 59th Light Anti-Aircraft Regiment (Lanark and Renfrew Scottish), RCA.
- Converted to infantry on 1 December 1959, and redesignated as The Lanark and Renfrew Scottish Regiment.
- Converted to air defence artillery on 10 November 1992, and redesignated as the 1st Air Defence Regiment (Lanark and Renfrew Scottish), RCA.
- Converted to field artillery in 2011 and redesignated 42nd Field Artillery Regiment (Lanark and Renfrew Scottish), RCA.

== Perpetuations ==
- 130th Battalion (Lanark and Renfrew), CEF
- 240th Battalion, CEF

== History ==
On 5 October 1866, the 42nd Brockville Battalion of Infantry was authorized. Its headquarters was at Brockville and had companies at Almonte, Brockville, Perth, Fitzroy (Kinburn), Lansdowne and Falls.

On 24 May 1870, the battalion was called out on active service in response to the Fenian Raids. After serving on the St. Lawrence River frontier, the battalion was removed from active service on 2 June 1870.

Battalion headquarters was moved to Pembroke, Ontario, on 1 December 1897. The battalion was then redesignated as the 42nd Lanark and Renfrew Battalion of Infantry.

On 8 May 1900, the battalion was redesignated as the 42nd Lanark and Renfrew Regiment.

=== Lineage chart ===
Lineage chart

1862 | Independent infy coys
1866 | 42nd "Brockville Bn of Infy"
1897 | 42nd "Lanark and Renfrew" Bn of Infy
1900 | 42nd Lanark and Renfrew Regt
1915 | 130th "Overseas" Bn, CEF
1916 | Absorbed by 12th Reserve Bn | 240th "Overseas" Bn, CEF
1917 | Absorbed by 7th Reserve Bn
1920 | 1st Bn (130th Bn, CEF), The Lanark and Renfrew Regt | 2nd Bn (240th Bn, CEF), (Note: Reserve) The Lanark and Renfrew Regt
1927 | 1st Bn (130th Bn, CEF), The Lanark and Renfrew Scottish Regt | 2nd Bn (240th Bn, CEF), The Lanark and Renfrew Scottish Regt
1936 | The Lanark and Renfrew Scottish Regt | Disbanded
1940 | 2nd (Reserve) Bn, The Lanark and Renfrew Scottish Regt
1941 | 1st Light Anti-Aircraft Regt, RCA, CASF
1942 | 1st Bn, The Lanark and Renfrew Scottish Regt, CASF
1943 | Disbanded
1944 | The Lanark and Renfrew Scottish Regt, CIC, CASF | The Lanark and Renfrew Scottish Regt (Reserve)
1945 | 1st Light Anti-Aircraft Regt (Lanark and Renfrew Scottish Regt), RCA, CASF
1945 | Disbanded
1946 | 59th Light Anti-Aircraft Regt (Lanark and Renfrew Scottish), RCA
1959 | The Lanark and Renfrew Scottish Regt
1992 | 1st Air Defence Regt (Lanark and Renfrew Scottish), RCA
2011 | 42nd Fd Arty Regt (Lanark and Renfrew Scottish), RCA

== Operational history ==
=== First World War ===
The 42nd Lanark and Renfrew Regiment was not mobilized itself for service overseas. However it contributed volunteers to the 2nd Battalion (Eastern Ontario Regiment), CEF; the 21st Battalion (Eastern Ontario), CEF; the 38th Battalion (Ottawa), CEF; the 77th Battalion (Ottawa), CEF; and the 80th Battalion, CEF.

On 22 December 1915, the 130th Battalion (Lanark and Renfrew), CEF was authorized for service and on 27 September 1916, the battalion embarked for Great Britain. After its arrival in the UK, on 6 October 1916, the battalion's personnel were absorbed by the 12th Reserve Battalion, CEF to provide reinforcements for the Canadian Corps in the field. On 21 May 1917, the 130th Battalion was disbanded.

On 15 July 1916, the 240th Battalion, CEF was authorized for service and on 3 May 1917, the battalion embarked for Great Britain. After its arrival in the UK, on 4 June 1917, the battalion's personnel were absorbed by the 7th Reserve Battalion, CEF to provide reinforcements for the Canadian Corps in the field. On 1 September 1917, the 240th Battalion was disbanded.

=== 1920s–1930s ===
On 12 March 1920, as a result of the Otter Commission and the following post-war reorganization of the militia, the 42nd Lanark and Renfrew Regiment was redesignated as The Lanark and Renfrew Regiment and was reorganized. From this point it had two battalions (one of them a paper-only reserve battalion) to perpetuate the assigned war-raised battalions of the Canadian Expeditionary Force.

On 15 July 1927, the regiment was reorganized as a Scottish unit and was redesignated as The Lanark and Renfrew Scottish Regiment. The regiment adopted the Government (Black Watch) tartan as part of its regimental uniform.

The regiment had three mottos incorporated into its badges: Fac et spera (Latin for 'Work and hope'); Ich dien (German for 'I serve'); and Nemo me impune lacessit (Latin for 'No one provokes me with impunity').

In 1930 the regiment was granted the following battle honours for the Great War. These honours became dormant when the regiment converted to artillery, being replaced by the RCA's honorary distinction Ubique (Latin for 'Everywhere').

- Somme, 1916 (Note: Selected to be borne on colours and appointments)
- Arras, 1917, (Note: "Arras, 1917" selected to be borne on colours and appointments) '18
- Ypres, 1917
- Amiens
- Hindenburg Line
- Pursuit to Mons

=== Second World War ===
==== Home defence ====
The regiment did not initially mobilize for the Second World War during the general activation of units beginning in August 1939.

The 1st Battalion, The Lanark and Renfrew Scottish Regiment, CASF was mobilized on 5 March 1942, and served as part of the Army's Atlantic Command in a home defence role. On 15 October 1943, The 1st Battalion was disbanded.

==== Italy and Northwest Europe ====
In July 1944, the 5th Canadian (Armoured) Division realized that it was short of infantry. The 12th Canadian Infantry Brigade was created out of units already in existence. One unit of the new brigade was the motor battalion of the division, a second was a re-equipped reconnaissance battalion from the 1st Canadian Infantry Division, and a third unit was created from anti-aircraft units, as the Allies had air superiority. This unit petitioned The Lanark and Renfrew Scottish for permission to use their name and regimental insignia, feeling it was more appropriate for an infantry battalion. Permission was granted, and The Lanark and Renfrew Scottish served in the 12th Brigade until March 1945. After all Canadian forces in Italy were transferred to the command of First Canadian Army in Northwest Europe (Operation Goldflake), the brigade was dissolved, the units therein returned to their former roles, and the Lanark and Renfrew Scottish battalion was returned to its former duties and designation.

The regiment was awarded these battle honours for the Second World War. Again, these honours were subsumed under ubique when the regiment converted to artillery.

- Coriano
- Misano Ridge
- Casale
- Naviglio Canal
- Italy 1944-45

== Organization ==
=== 42nd Brockville Battalion of Infantry (5 October 1866) ===
- No. 1 Company (Almonte, ON) (first raised on 5 December 1862 as the Almonte Infantry Company)
- No. 2 Company (Brockville, ON) (first raised on 11 December 1862 as the Brockville Infantry Company)
- No. 3 Company (Perth, ON) (first raised on 16 January 1863 as the Perth Infantry Company)
- No. 4 Company (Fitzroy (Kinburn), ON) (first raised on 16 January 1863 as the FitzRoy Infantry Company)
- No. 5 Company (Lansdowne, ON) (first raised on 15 June 1866 as the Lansdowne Infantry Company)
- No. 6 Company (Smith's Falls, ON) (first raised on 22 June 1866 as the Smith's Falls Infantry Company)

=== The Lanark and Renfrew Regiment (15 April 1922) ===
- 1st Battalion (perpetuating the 130th Battalion, CEF)
- 2nd (Reserve) Battalion (perpetuating the 240th Battalion, CEF)

=== The Lanark and Renfrew Scottish Regiment (15 July 1927) ===
- Regimental Headquarters (Perth, ON)
- HQ Company (Renfrew, ON)
- A Company (Pembroke, ON)
- B Company (Arnprior, ON)
- C Company (Smith's Falls, ON)
- D Company (Perth, ON)

== Alliances ==
- United Kingdom – The Black Watch (Royal Highlanders)

== Affiliated cadet corps ==
The regiment is affiliated with two Royal Canadian Army Cadet Corps:

- 2677 Army Cadet Corps – Pembroke, Ontario
- 2360 Army Cadet Corps – Arnprior, Ontario

== Perpetuations ==
=== Great War ===
- 130th Battalion (Lanark and Renfrew), CEF
- 240th Battalion, CEF

== Alliances ==
United Kingdom – Royal Regiment of Scotland

== Order of precedence ==
| Preceded by 30th Field Artillery Regiment, RCA | 42nd Field Artillery Regiment (Lanark and Renfrew Scottish), RCA | Succeeded by 49th Field Artillery Regiment, RCA of Royal Canadian Artillery |

== See also ==
- Canadian-Scottish regiment
- Military history of Canada
- History of the Canadian Army
