= Scots Fusiliers of Canada =

The Scots Fusiliers of Canada
- Active: 1914–1965
- Country: Canada
- Branch: Canadian Militia (1914–1940); Canadian Army (1940–1965)
- Type: Fusiliers
- Role: Infantry
- Size: One regiment
- Part of: Non-Permanent Active Militia (1871–1940); Royal Canadian Infantry Corps (1942–1946, 1959–1965); Royal Canadian Artillery (1946–1959)
- Garrison/HQ: Kitchener, Ontario
- Colors: Facing Colour: Blue
- March: Quick: “Highland Laddie”, “The British Grenadiers”
- Engagements: First World War
- Battle honours: See #Battle Honours

Insignia
- Hackle: White
- Tartan: Black Watch – Government

The Scots Fusiliers of Canada was an infantry regiment of the Non-Permanent Active Militia of the Canadian Militia (later the Canadian Army). In 1965, the regiment was amalgamated with the Highland Light Infantry of Canada to form The Highland Fusiliers of Canada (now The Royal Highland Fusiliers of Canada).

== Regimental badge ==
The regimental badge of The Scots Fusiliers of Canada consisted of the following design:

A thirteen-flame grenade with a maple leaf on the ball of the grenade; superimposed upon the maple leaf, the royal badge of Scotland, i.e., a thistle surmounted by the Crown.

== Lineage ==
=== The Scots Fusiliers of Canada ===
- Originated on 21 September 1914 in Berlin (now Kitchener), Ontario when authorized as the 108th Regiment.
- Redesignated on 29 March 1920 as The Waterloo Regiment.
- Redesignated on 3 August 1920 as the North Waterloo Regiment.
- Redesignated on 15 September 1928 as The Scots Fusiliers of Canada.
- Redesignated on 5 March 1942 as the 2nd (Reserve) Battalion, The Scots Fusiliers of Canada.
- Redesignated on 15 October 1943 as The Scots Fusiliers of Canada (Reserve).
- Redesignated on 7 November 1945 as The Scots Fusiliers of Canada.
- Converted on 1 April 1946 to artillery and redesignated as the 54th Light Anti-Aircraft Regiment (Scots Fusiliers of Canada), RCA.
- Converted on 1 December 1959 back to infantry and redesignated as The Scots Fusiliers of Canada.
- Amalgamated on 26 February 1965 with The Highland Light Infantry of Canada to form The Highland Fusiliers of Canada.

== Perpetuations ==
- 118th (North Waterloo) Battalion, CEF

== History ==
=== Early history ===
On 21 September 1914, the 108th Regiment was authorized. Its regimental headquarters was established in Berlin (now Kitchener), Ontario.

=== First World War ===
On 22 December 1915, the 118th (North Waterloo) Battalion, CEF was authorized for service, and on 22 January 1917, the battalion embarked for Great Britain. Upon arrival in the UK, on 6 February 1917, the battalion’s personnel were absorbed by the 25th Reserve Battalion, CEF to provide reinforcements for the Canadian Corps in the field. On 17 July 1917, the 118th Battalion, CEF was disbanded.

=== Second World War ===
On 5 March 1942, the 1st Battalion, The Scots Fusiliers, CASF was mobilized for active service. The battalion served in Canada in the home defence role as a part of Military District No. 2. On 15 October 1943, the battalion was disbanded.

== Alliances ==
- United Kingdom – The Royal Scots Fusiliers. (1928–1959)
- United Kingdom – The Royal Highland Fusiliers (Princess Margaret's Own Glasgow and Ayrshire Regiment) (1959–1965)

== Uniform ==
Before its conversion to Artillery in 1946, The Scots Fusiliers of Canada wore the following uniform in Full Dress:

Fusilier cap, with white hackle. Glengarry, blue, with diced border.

Scarlet doublet with Blue facings.

Trews, 42nd Tartan. Pipers, Erskine Tartan.

== Battle honours ==
- The Great War, 1917

== See also ==
- Canadian-Scottish regiment
