= 130th Battalion (Lanark and Renfrew), CEF =

Former Canadian military unit

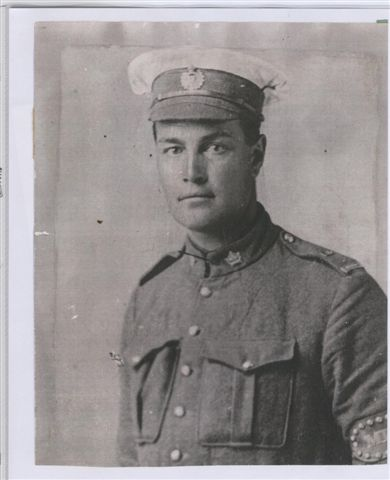
Private Joseph Pappin, 130 Battalion, Canadian Expeditionary Force.

The 130th (Lanark and Renfrew) Battalion, CEF was a unit in the Canadian Expeditionary Force during the First World War. Based in Perth, Ontario, the unit began recruiting in late 1915 in Lanark and Renfrew Counties. After sailing to England in September 1916, the battalion was absorbed into the 12th Reserve Battalion on October 6, 1916. The 130th Battalion, CEF had one Officer Commanding: Lieut-Col. J. E. de Hertel.

130th Battalion (Lanark and Renfrew), CEF, is perpetuated by the 42nd Field Artillery Regiment (Lanark and Renfrew Scottish), RCA.
