= Highland Light Infantry of Canada =

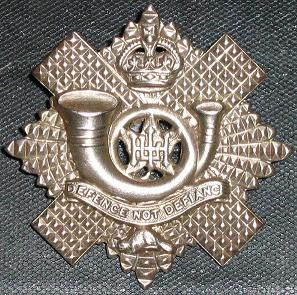
Highland Light Infantry of Canada
- Active: 1886–1954, 1957–1965
- Country: Canada
- Branch: Canadian Militia (1886-1940); Canadian Army (1940-1954, 1957-1965)
- Type: Light Infantry
- Role: Infantry
- Size: One battalion
- Part of: Non-Permanent Active Militia (1886-1940); Royal Canadian Infantry Corps (1942-1954, 1957-1965)
- Garrison/HQ: Galt, Ontario
- Motto: Defence Not Defiance
- Colors: Facing colour buff
- March: Quick – Band: "Whistle o'er the Lave o't” Quick – Pipes: "Sean Triubhas"
- Engagements: First World War; Second World War
- Battle honours: See #Battle Honours

Commanders
- Notable commanders: Harry Wickwire Foster

Insignia
- Tartan: MacKenzie

The Highland Light Infantry of Canada was an infantry regiment of the Canadian Army. In 1965, the regiment was amalgamated with The Scots Fusiliers of Canada to form The Highland Fusiliers of Canada (now The Royal Highland Fusiliers of Canada).

== Lineage ==
- Originated on 14 September, 1866, in Berlin, Ontario as the 29th Waterloo Battalion of Infantry
- Redesignated on 8 May, 1900, as the 29th Waterloo Regiment
- Redesignated on 15 April, 1915, as the 29th Regiment (Highland Light Infantry of Canada)
- Redesignated on 29 March, 1920, as The Highland Light Infantry of Canada
- Redesignated on 7 November, 1940, as the 2nd (Reserve) Battalion, The Highland Light Infantry of Canada
- Redesignated on 1 May, 1946, as The Highland Light Infantry of Canada
- Amalgamated on 1 October, 1954, with The Perth Regiment and Redesignated as The Perth and Waterloo Regiment (Highland Light Infantry of Canada)
- Amalgamation ceased on 1 April, 1957, and Resumed as The Highland Light Infantry of Canada
- Amalgamated on 26 February, 1965, with The Scots Fusiliers of Canada and Redesignated as The Highland Fusiliers of Canada

== Perpetuations ==
The regiment perpetuated the following units:

- 34th Battalion, CEF
- 111th Battalion (South Waterloo), CEF

== History ==
=== Early history ===
With the passing of the Militia Act of 1855, the first of a number of newly-raised independent militia companies were established in and around the Waterloo County region of Canada West (now the Province of Ontario).

On 14 September, 1866, the 29th Waterloo Battalion of Infantry was authorized for service by the regimentation of five of these previously authorized independent militia infantry companies. Its Regimental Headquarters was located at Berlin and had companies at New Hamburg, Galt, Waterloo, Crosshill, Berlin and Ayr, Ontario.

On 8 May, 1900, the 29th Waterloo Battalion of Infantry was Reorganized and Redesignated as the 29th Waterloo Regiment and in 1912, the regiment had its Regimental Headquarters relocated to Galt, Ontario.

=== The First World War ===
When the Great War broke out in August 1914, the 29th Waterloo Regiment was not mobilized for active service. However, when the Canadian Expeditionary Force was raised for service overseas, the 29th Regiment would contribute a contingent to help form the 1st Battalion (Ontario Regiment), CEF along with other regiments from the Canadian Militia’s Military District 1 of Western Ontario.

On 15 April, 1915, while still serving within Canada in the home defence role, the 29th Waterloo Regiment was Redesignated as the 29th Regiment (Highland Light Infantry of Canada).

On 7 November, 1914, the 34th Battalion, CEF was authorized for service and on 23 October, 1915, the battalion embarked for Great Britain. After its arrival in the UK, the battalion provided reinforcements to the Canadian Corps in the field. On 27 November, 1916, the battalion was Reorganized as the 34th Boys Battalion, CEF. On 17 July, 1917, the 34th Battalion, CEF was disbanded.

On 22 December, 1915, the 111th Battalion (South Waterloo), CEF was authorized for service and on 25 September, 1916, the battalion embarked for Great Britain. On 13 October 1916, the battalion’s personnel were absorbed by the 35th Battalion, CEF to provide reinforcements for the Canadian Corps in the field. On 21 May, 1917, the 111th Battalion (South Waterloo), CEF was disbanded.

=== 1920s-1930s ===
On 29 March, 1920, as a result of the Otter Commission and the following post-war reorganization of the militia, the 29th Regiment (Highland Light Infantry of Canada) was Redesignated as The Highland Light Infantry of Canada and was Reorganized with 2 battalions (1 of them a paper-only reserve battalion) to perpetuate the assigned war-raised battalions of the Canadian Expeditionary Force.

=== The Second World War ===
On 24 May, 1940, The Highland Light Infantry of Canada mobilized The Highland Light Infantry of Canada, CASF for active service. On 7 November, 1940, the battalion was Redesignated as the 1st Battalion, The Highland Light Infantry of Canada, CASF and on 20 July, 1941, the battalion embarked for Great Britain. On D-Day, 6 June 1944, the battalion landed in Normandy, France as part of the 9th Canadian Infantry Brigade, 3rd Canadian Infantry Division, and continued to fight in North-West Europe until the end of the war. On 15 January, 1946, the overseas battalion was disbanded.

On 1 June, 1945, the regiment subsequently mobilized the 3rd Battalion, The Highland Light Infantry of Canada, CIC, CAOF for active service with the Canadian Army Occupation Force in Germany. On 1 May, 1946, the battalion was disbanded.

=== Post War ===
On 1 October, 1954, as a result of the Kennedy Report on the Reserve Army, this regiment was amalgamated with The Perth Regiment to form The Perth and Waterloo Regiment (Highland Light Infantry of Canada). However, on 1 April, 1957, as a result of the Anderson Report on the Canadian Army (Militia), both regiments were unamalgamated and again resumed their individual regimental identities as both The Perth Regiment and The Highland Light Infantry of Canada respectively.

On February 26, 1965, The Highland Light Infantry of Canada was Amalgamated again, this time with The Scots Fusiliers of Canada and was renamed The Highland Fusiliers of Canada (now The Royal Highland Fusiliers of Canada).

At the time of its Amalgamation with The Scots Fusiliers of Canada, The Highland Light Infantry of Canada held its final order of precedence as 17.

== Organization ==
=== 29th Waterloo Battalion of Infantry (14 September, 1866) ===
- No. 1 Company (New Hamburg, Ontario) (first raised on 21 November, 1862 as the New Hamburg Volunteer Militia Company of Infantry)
- No. 2 Company (Galt, Ontario) (first raised on 8 June, 1866 as the Galt Infantry Company)
- No. 3 Company (Waterloo, Ontario) (first raised on 8 June, 1866 as the Waterloo Infantry Company)
- No. 4 Company (Cross Hill, Ontario) (first raised on 31 August, 1866 as the Cross Hill Infantry Company)
- No. 5 Company (Berlin, Ontario) (first raised on 14 September, 1866 as the Berlin Infantry Company)

=== The Highland Light Infantry of Canada (01 April, 1920) ===
- Regimental Headquarters (Galt, Ontario)
- A Company (Galt, Ontario)
- B Company (Galt, Ontario)
- C Company (Galt, Ontario)
- D Company (Preston, Ontario)

=== The Highland Light Infantry of Canada (15 September, 1921) ===
- 1st Battalion (perpetuating the 34th Battalion, CEF)
  - Regimental Headquarters (Galt, Ontario)
  - A Company (Galt, Ontario)
  - B Company (Galt, Ontario)
  - C Company (Galt, Ontario)
  - D Company (Preston, Ontario)
- 2nd (Reserve) Battalion (perpetuating the 111th Battalion, CEF)

== Alliances ==
- United Kingdom - The Highland Light Infantry (City of Glasgow Regiment) (1920-1959)
- United Kingdom - The Royal Highland Fusiliers (Princess Margaret's Own Glasgow and Ayrshire Regiment) (1959-1965)

== Uniform ==
The regiment were initially kitted with a green Glengarry, trews and scarlet doublet, but became kilted in 1935. Pipers and bandsmen wore a feather bonnet, red hackle, black sporran with three white points, MacKenzie hose for the pipers and red and white for the regiment, and a blue Balmoral bonnet with a diced border, green tourie and red and white hackle.

== Battle honours ==
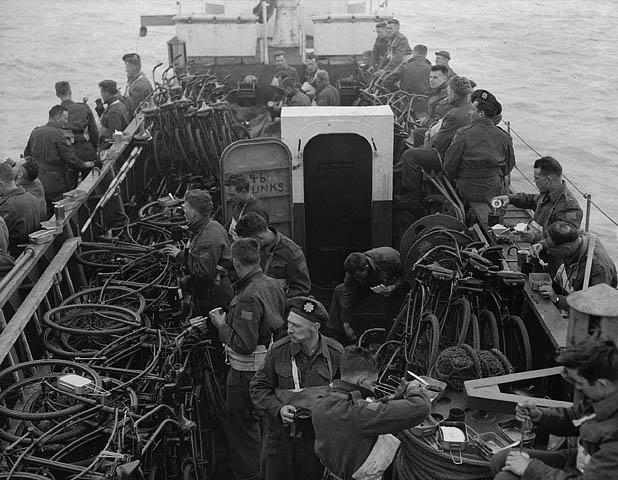
Infantrymen of the Highland Light Infantry of Canada aboard a landing craft en route to France on D-Day. LCI(L) 306th of the 2nd Canadian (262nd RN) Flotilla

Battle honours in small capitals are awarded for participation in large operations and campaigns, while those in lowercase indicate honours granted for more specific battles. Battle honours in bold type are authorized to be emblazoned on regimental colours.

=== The Great War ===
- **Mount Sorrel**
- **Somme, 1916**
- **Arras, 1917, '18**
- **Hill 70**
- **Ypres, 1917**
- **Amiens**
- **Hindenburg Line**
- **Pursuit to Mons**

=== The Second World War ===
- **Normandy Landing**
- **Caen**
- **The Orne (Buron)**
- **Bourguébus Ridge**
- Faubourg de Vaucelles
- **Falaise**
- **The Laison**
- Chambois
- **Boulogne, 1944**
- Calais, 1944
- **The Scheldt**
- Savojaards Platt
- Breskens Pocket
- **The Rhineland**
- Waal Flats
- The Hochwald
- **The Rhine**
- Zutphen
- Leer
- North-West Europe, 1944-1945

== See also ==
- Canadian-Scottish regiment
- The Royal Highland Fusiliers of Canada
- Highland Light Infantry

== Bibliography ==
- Barnes, RM, The Uniforms and History of the Scottish Regiments, London, Sphere Books Limited, 1972.
- Bartlett, Jack Fortune "1st Battalion the Highland Light Infantry of Canada, 1940-1945" 1951
