= 240th Battalion, CEF =

The 240th Battalion, CEF was a unit in the Canadian Expeditionary Force during the First World War. Based in Renfrew, Ontario, the unit began recruiting in the Spring of 1916 in the counties of Lanark, Renfrew, and Frontenac. After sailing to England in May 1917, the battalion was absorbed into the 156th (Leeds and Grenville) Battalion, CEF and the 6th and 7th Reserve Battalions in June, 1917. The 240th Battalion, CEF had one Officer Commanding: Lieut-Col. E. J. Watt.

The battalion is perpetuated by the 42nd Field Artillery Regiment (Lanark and Renfrew Scottish), RCA.
