= 31 Service Battalion =

- Unit Crest
- Active: 2010 – present (as 31 Service Battalion) 1975 – 2010 (as 21, 22, and 23 Service Battalions) 1965 – 1975 (as Hamilton Service Battalion)
- Country: Canada
- Branch: Primary Reserve
- Part of: 2nd Canadian Division
- Garrison/HQ: London, Ontario (HQ), Hamilton, Ontario, and Windsor, Ontario
- Motto: BELLUM EST CRAS (War is tomorrow)

Commanders
- Commanding Officer: Lieutenant-Colonel Jessica Crawford
- Regimental Sergeant Major: Chief Warrant Officer Gary Archer
- Abbreviation: 31 Svc Bn

31 Service Battalion is a combat service support unit of The Canadian Army Reserve in 31 Canadian Brigade. The unit was formed in 2010 when 21 (Windsor) Service Battalion, 22 (London) Service Battalion, 23 (Hamilton) Service Battalion and elements of Area Support Unit London were merged into one formation.

== Unit history ==
The unit's predecessor was Hamilton Service Battalion, formed on 1 January 1965. The new battalion was made up of four units, 133 Company Royal Canadian Army Service Corps (RCASC), 16 Medical Company Royal Canadian Army Medical Corps (RCAMC), 5 Technical Regiment Royal Canadian Electrical Mechanical Engineers (RCEME), 4 Ordnance Company Royal Canadian Ordnance Corps (RCOC), a platoon of Military Police and members of the Canadian Women's Army Corps. The unit became part of the Hamilton Militia District. The Hamilton Service Battalion, originally Stationed at the Burlington Street Armouries, marched to its present location at CFRB Hamilton in April 1968, Where it is collocated with HMCS Star and 23 Field Ambulance.

Hamilton Service Battalion remained unchanged until 1974 when transformation reached the militia, the Service Support Corps were disbanded and replaced with the branches we have in place today. Soldiers were issued with the distinctive environmental uniform and combats replacing the World War Two battle dress and Korean vintage bush dress, the rank structure also changed at this time. Pay at this time was $12.00 per day and was paid twice yearly there were no additional benefits provided.

The next major change occurred in 1975 when all Service Battalions were numbered and we became 23 (Hamilton) Service Battalion. The numbering system is based on geography. All Ontario Service Battalions with the exception of Thunder Bay are affiliated with 2 Service Battalion a regular force unit based in Petawawa Ontario. Thus Hamilton became 23, London 22, Windsor 21.

In 1976 the Medical Company became an independent unit known as 23 Medical Company, Canadian Forces Medical Services.

On 3 November 2001, the battalion (in its former designation as 23 Service Battalion) was granted Freedom of the City of Hamilton by Mayor Bob Wade.

With the closing of the Militia Districts and the formation of the Brigade system, 23 Service Battalion became part of 31 Brigade Group headquartered in London, Ontario. 31 Brigade encompasses most of South Western Ontario. 31 Service share the responsibility of providing Combat Service Support to 31 Brigade with 21 Windsor, 22 London, and 23 Hamilton Support Companies. The Military Police became a Brigade asset and were transferred to Headquarters in London.

23 Service Battalion was last commanded by Lieutenant Colonel J. Newton CD and the Regimental Sergeant Major is Chief Warrant Officer R.M. Hewins CD before being tactically grouped with 21 (Windsor) and 22 (London) Service Battalions under the command of LCol R. Hewins CD and the Regimental Sergeant Major CWO Gaudet CD in preparation for the amalgamation of the three service battalions into a single unit—31 Service Battalion—as Hamilton, London, and Windsor Support Companies.

The history of the unit's command teams are as follows: Commanding Officers - Lieutenant-Colonel R.A. Phillips, CD Lieutenant-Colonel C. Poole, CD Lieutenant-Colonel S. Harding, CD Lieutenant-Colonel B. Medd, CD Lieutenant-Colonel S. Briand, CD Lieutenant-Colonel D.E. Meehan, CD Lieutenant-Colonel B. Griffiths, CD.

Regimental Sergeants Major - Chief Warrant Officer R. Guadet, CD Chief Warrant Officer J. Jurasko, CD Chief Warrant Officer M. Delarosbil, MMM CD Chief Warrant Officer R. Turnbull, CD Chief Warrant Officer R. Watkins, CD Chief Warrant Officer R. Gonsalves, CD.

== Operational history ==
=== Overseas ===
Members of the battalion have served with NATO on Reforger Exercises in West Germany and in Norway, and with distinction on peacekeeping missions with the United Nations, NATO and multi-national forces, in Egypt, Cyprus, Golan Heights, Namibia, Cambodia, Somalia, Bosnia, Kosovo, Rwanda and Afghanistan.

=== Domestic ===
Unit members have also served on domestic operations during the Olympic Games in Canada, the blizzard of 1977 in the Niagara region, the Manitoba floods of 1997 and the ice storms of 1998 in eastern Ontario.

== Affiliations ==
31 Service Battalion is affiliated with the British Army's 158 Regiment RLC (formerly of the Royal Anglian Regiment). The units used to exchange annual training exercises where members of 158 Regiment undergo winter warfare training at 4th Canadian Division Training Centre Meaford, Ontario and 31 Service Battalion members would attend a fall exercise in England.
