= 12th Canadian Infantry Brigade =

Brigade of the Canadian Army

The 12th Canadian Infantry Brigade was a brigade-sized infantry formation of the Canadian Army which saw service as part of the 4th Canadian Division in both World War I and later in World War II, this time as part of the 5th Canadian Division.
