= Royal Highland Fusiliers of Canada =

The Royal Highland Fusiliers of Canada
- Regimental badge
- Active: 14 September 1866–present
- Country: Canada
- Branch: Canadian Army
- Type: Line infantry
- Role: Light infantry (one company); Medium mortar 81 mm (one platoon)
- Size: One battalion
- Part of: 31 Canadian Brigade Group
- Garrison/HQ: Cambridge and Kitchener, Ontario
- Motto: Defence not defiance
- March: Quick: "Seann Triubhas"/"The Highland Laddie"; Slow: "74ths Slow March"
- Anniversaries: Regimental Birthday – 14 September; Battle of Buron– 8 July
- Engagements: First World War; Second World War; War in Afghanistan
- Battle honours: See #Battle honours
- Website: canada.ca/en/army/corporate/4-canadian-division/the-royal-highland-fusiliers.html

Commanders
- Commanding officer: LCol Jason Robinson, CD
- Regimental sergeant major: CWO Thomas Feletar, CD

Insignia
- Tartan: MacKenzie
- Identification symbol: RHFC

The Royal Highland Fusiliers of Canada is a Primary Reserve light infantry regiment of the Canadian Army, with companies in Cambridge and Kitchener, and is an infantry sub-unit of 31 Canadian Brigade Group, headquartered in London, Ontario. Princess Margaret, Countess of Snowdon, and the then Prince Andrew, Duke of York, as members of the Canadian royal family, acted as Colonel-in-Chief.

== Lineage ==
Regimental colour

Camp flag

=== The Royal Highland Fusiliers of Canada ===
- Originated 14 September 1866 in Berlin, Ontario, as the 29th Waterloo Battalion of Infantry
- Redesignated 8 May 1900 as the 29th Waterloo Regiment
- Redesignated 15 April 1915 as the 29th Regiment (Highland Light Infantry of Canada)
- Redesignated 29 March 1920 as The Highland Light Infantry of Canada
- Redesignated 7 November 1940 as the 2nd (Reserve) Battalion, The Highland Light Infantry of Canada
- Redesignated 1 May 1946 as The Highland Light Infantry of Canada
- Amalgamated 1 October 1954 with The Perth Regiment and renamed as The Perth and Waterloo Regiment (Highland Light Infantry of Canada)
- Amalgamation ceased 1 April 1957, the two regiments ceased to be amalgamated and resumed their former designations
- Amalgamated 26 February 1965 with The Scots Fusiliers of Canada and redesignated as The Highland Fusiliers of Canada
- Redesignated 7 July 1998 as The Royal Highland Fusiliers of Canada

=== The Scots Fusiliers of Canada ===
- Originated 21 September 1914 in Berlin, Ontario when an "eight company regiment of infantry" was authorized to be formed.
- Designated 1 February 1915 as the 108th Regiment
- Redesignated 29 March 1920 as The Waterloo Regiment
- Redesignated 3 August 1920 as the North Waterloo Regiment
- Redesignated 15 September 1928 as The Scots Fusiliers of Canada
- Redesignated 5 March 1942 as the 2nd (Reserve) Battalion, The Scots Fusiliers of Canada
- Redesignated 15 October 1943 as The Scots Fusiliers of Canada (Reserve)
- Redesignated 7 November 1945 as The Scots Fusiliers of Canada
- Converted 1 April 1946 to artillery and redesignated as the 54th Light Anti-Aircraft Regiment (Scots Fusiliers of Canada), RCA
- Converted 1 December 1959 to infantry and redesignated as The Scots Fusiliers of Canada
- Amalgamated 26 February 1965 with The Highland Light Infantry of Canada

=== Lineage chart ===
Lineage chart

1862	Independent infy coys
1866	29th "Waterloo Bn of Infy"
1900	29th Waterloo Regt
1914	34th Bn, CEF	Regt of infy authorized
1915	29th Regt (Highland Light Infy of Canada)	111th "Overseas" Bn, CEF	118th "Overseas" Bn, CEF	108th Regt
1916	34th Boys' Bn, CEF	Absorbed by 35th "Overseas" Bn
1917	Disbanded	Absorbed by 25th Reserve Bn
1920	1st Bn (34th Bn, CEF), The Highland Light Infy of Canada	2nd Bn (111th Bn, CEF), (Note: Reserve) The Highland Light Infy of Canada	1st Bn (118th Bn, CEF), The Waterloo Regt
1920	1st Bn (118th Bn, CEF), North Waterloo Regt
1928	1st Bn (118th Bn, CEF), The Scots Fusiliers of Canada
1936	The Highland Light Infy of Canada	Disbanded	The Scots Fusiliers of Canada
1940	The Highland Light Infy of Canada, CASF
1940	1st Bn, The Highland Light Infy of Canada, CASF	2nd (Reserve) Bn, The Highland Light Infy of Canada
1942	1st Bn, The Scots Fusiliers, CASF	2nd (Reserve) Bn, The Scots Fusiliers of Canada
1943	Disbanded	The Scots Fusiliers of Canada (Reserve)
1945	3rd Bn, The Highland Light Infy of Canada, CIC, CAOF	The Scots Fusiliers of Canada
1946	Disbanded	The Highland Light Infy of Canada	Disbanded	54th Light Anti-Aircraft Regt (Scots Fusiliers of Canada), RCA
The Perth Regt
1954	The Perth and Waterloo Regt (Highland Light Infy of Canada)
1957	The Highland Light Infy of Canada	The Perth Regt
1959	The Scots Fusiliers of Canada
1965	The Highland Fusiliers of Canada
1998	The Royal Highland Fusiliers of Canada

== History ==
=== Great War ===
The 34th Battalion, CEF, was authorized on 7 November 1914 and embarked for Britain on 23 October 1915, where it provided reinforcements to Canadian units in the field until 27 November 1916, when it was reorganized as the 34th Battalion (Boys'), CEF. The battalion was subsequently disbanded on 17 July 1917.

It was recruited in Guelph, Ontario, and district and was mobilized at Guelph. It had one Officer Commanding, Lt.-Col. A.J. Oliver, who commanded the battalion from 23 October 1915 to 6 July 1916.

The 111th Battalion (South Waterloo), CEF was authorized on 22 December 1915 and embarked for Britain on 25 September 1916 where on 13 October 1916 its personnel were absorbed by the 35th Battalion, CEF to provide reinforcements for Canadian units in the field. The 111th Battalion was disbanded on 21 May 1917.

The 118th (North Waterloo) Battalion, CEF was authorized on 22 December 1915 and embarked for Britain on 22 January 1917 where on 6 February 1917, its personnel were absorbed by the 25th Reserve Battalion, CEF, to provide reinforcements for Canadian units in the field. The 118th Battalion was disbanded on 17 July 1917.

The regiment perpetuates all these three battalions.

=== Second World War ===
The Highland Light Infantry of Canada mobilized the Highland Light Infantry of Canada, CASF, for active service on 24 May 1940. It was redesignated as the 1st Battalion, The Highland Light Infantry of Canada, CASF, on 7 November 1940 and embarked for Britain on 20 July 1941. On D-Day, 6 June 1944, it landed on Juno Beach in Normandy as part of the 9th Canadian Infantry Brigade, 3rd Canadian Infantry Division, and it continued to fight in North-West Europe until the end of the war. The overseas battalion was disbanded on 15 January 1946. The regiment subsequently mobilized the 3rd Battalion, The Highland Light Infantry of Canada, Canadian Infantry Corps, Canadian Army Occupation Force on 1 June 1945 for service in Germany. The 3rd Battalion was disbanded on 1 May 1946.

The Scots Fusiliers mobilized the 1st Battalion, The Scots Fusiliers, CASF, for active service on 5 March 1942. It served in Canada in a home defence role as part of Military District No. 2 until the battalion was disbanded on 15 October 1943.

On D-Day, June 6, 1944, the regiment disembarking at Nan sector on Juno Beach with the rest of the 9th Brigade, the Stormont, Dundas and Glengarry Highlanders, and the North Nova Scotia Highlanders. These regiments were not in the first wave assault, but landed later in the morning and advanced through the lead brigades.

The Highland Light Infantry continued to serve throughout Europe. From D-day to the end of war of Europe the regiment became one of the most battle hardened units in the Canadian army.

=== War in Afghanistan ===
The regiment contributed an aggregate of more than 20% of its authorized strength to the various Task Forces which served in Afghanistan between 2002 and 2014.

== Alliances ==
- United Kingdom - The Royal Highland Fusiliers, 2nd Bn, Royal Regiment of Scotland - 2 SCOTS
- United Kingdom - 52nd Lowland Volunteers, 6th Bn, Royal Regiment of Scotland - 6 SCOTS

== Battle honours ==
Regimental colour

Battle honours in small capitals are for large operations and campaigns and those in lowercase are for more specific battles. Bold type indicates honours emblazoned on the regimental colour.

First World War
- **Mount Sorrel**
- **Somme, 1916**
- **Arras, 1917, '18**
- **Hill 70**
- **Ypres, 1917**
- **Amiens**
- **Hindenburg Line**
- **Pursuit to Mons**
Second World War
- **Normandy Landing**
- **Caen**
- **The Orne (Buron)**
- **Bourguébus Ridge**
- Faubourg de Vaucelles
- **Falaise**
- **The Laison**
- Chambois
- **Boulogne, 1944**
- Calais, 1944
- **The Scheldt**
- Savojaards Platt
- Breskens Pocket
- **The Rhineland**
- Waal Flats
- The Hochwald
- **The Rhine**
- Zutphen
- Leer
- North-West Europe, 1944–1945
South-West Asia
Afghanistan

== Armoury ==
Site	Date(s)	Designated	Location	Description	Image
Cambridge Armoury Ainslie Street South,	1914-5	1987 Recognized - Register of the Government of Canada Heritage Buildings	Cambridge, Ontario	Housing The Royal Highland Fusiliers of Canada, this centrally located, brick and stone structure features a façade, flanking towers and a low-pitched gable roof; it projects a solid, fortified appearance	

== See also ==
- Canadian-Scottish regiment
- List of Canadian organizations with royal patronage
- Highland Light Infantry of Canada
- Highland Light Infantry
- The Canadian Crown and the Canadian Forces
- Military history of Canada
- History of the Canadian Army
- Canadian Forces
- List of armouries in Canada

== Notes ==
Preceded by 4th Battalion, The Royal Canadian Regiment	The Royal Highland Fusiliers of Canada	Succeeded by The Grey and Simcoe Foresters
