= 111th Battalion (South Waterloo), CEF =

The 111th Battalion (South Waterloo), CEF, was an infantry battalion of the Great War Canadian Expeditionary Force. The 111th Battalion was authorized on 22 December 1915 and embarked for Britain on 25 September 1916, where, on 13 October 1916, its personnel were absorbed by the 35th Battalion, CEF, to provide reinforcements for the Canadian Corps in the field. The battalion disbanded on 21 May 1917.

The 111th Battalion recruited in Waterloo County, Ontario, and was mobilized at Galt. The battalion was commanded by Lt.-Col. J.D. Clarke from 6 October 1916 to 13 October 1916.

The 111th Battalion was awarded the battle honour THE GREAT WAR 1916.

The 111th Battalion (South Waterloo), CEF, is perpetuated by The Royal Highland Fusiliers of Canada.

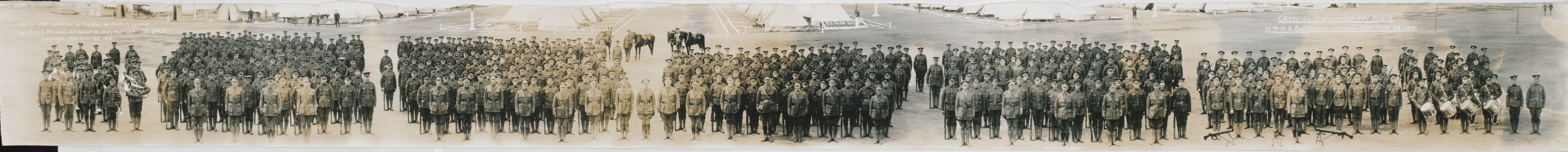

== Sources ==
- Canadian Expeditionary Force 1914–1919 by Col. G.W.L. Nicholson, CD, Queen's Printer, Ottawa, Ontario, 1962
