= 35th Battalion, CEF =

Canadian infantry battalion

The 35th Battalion, CEF was an infantry battalion of the Canadian Expeditionary Force during the Great War.

== History ==
The 35th Battalion was authorized on 7 November 1914 and embarked for Britain on 16 October 1915. The battalion was redesignated the 35th Reserve Battalion, CEF on 9 February 1915, and provided reinforcements to the Canadian Corps in the field until 4 January 1917 when its personnel were absorbed by the 4th Reserve Battalion, CEF. The battalion was disbanded on 8 December 1917.

The 99th Battalion (Essex), CEF was authorized on 22 December 1915 and embarked for Great Britain on 31 May 1916, where, on 6 July 1916, its personnel were absorbed by the 35th Reserve Battalion.

The 35th Battalion recruited and was mobilized at Toronto, Ontario.

The 35th battalion had two Officers Commanding:

- Lt.-Col. F.C. McCordick, 16 October 1915 – 24 October 1916
- Maj. F.H. Dunham, 24 October 1916 – 4 January 1917

The 35th Battalion was awarded the battle honour THE GREAT WAR 1915-17.

== Perpetuation ==
The 35th Battalion, CEF, is perpetuated by The Queen's York Rangers (1st American Regiment) (RCAC).

== See also ==
- List of infantry battalions in the Canadian Expeditionary Force

== Sources ==
- Canadian Expeditionary Force 1914-1919 by Col. G.W.L. Nicholson, CD, Queen's Printer, Ottawa, Ontario, 1962
