= CFS Debert =

Canadian military station in Nova Scotia

- Part of Canadian Forces
- Debert, Nova Scotia

Site information
- Type: Military Base
- Owner: Civilian: 1996–present
- Open to the public: As a museum

Location
- Coordinates: 45°25′44″N 063°26′42″W

Site history
- Built: c. 1940
- In use: 1938-1996 (military); 1996- (as museum)

Canadian Forces Station Debert (also CFS Debert) was a Canadian Forces station located in Debert, Nova Scotia. It was most recently used during the Cold War as a communications facility and was home to a "Regional Emergency Government Headquarters" (REGH) complex, more commonly known by the nickname "Diefenbunker."

Originally this facility was developed with an airfield and army training centre, however these facilities were partly decommissioned in the 1970s and ownership of the airfield and some lands/buildings transferred to the Government of Nova Scotia to be operated as the Debert Air Industrial Park. Following decommissioning of the REGH and removal of the last military presence at CFS Debert in 1996, the rest of the facility was transferred to the Government of Nova Scotia and then the Colchester Regional Development Authority to operate as Colchester Park.

== Debert Military Camp ==
Following the outbreak of the Second World War in the fall of 1939, the first Canadian units began shipping through the port of Halifax; however the end of the Phoney War in the spring of 1940 required a massive ramp-up in Canada's land forces in Europe. The sheer volume of soldiers who would be embarking through Halifax required staging facilities for training and marshalling combat units before embarking on the troopships.

To meet this requirement, the government announced that existing facilities at Camp Aldershot near Kentville, Nova Scotia and Camp Sussex near Sussex, New Brunswick would be upgraded to handle the requirements of housing and training brigade-size units. In spring of 1940, the government also began purchasing additional land in Debert for a division-size training and marshalling facility adjacent to those lands previously purchased in 1938 by the Royal Canadian Air Force for an aerodrome.

Located on the Montreal-Halifax main line of Canadian National Railways, the flat plain surrounding Debert Station were considered ideal for an army staging facility in addition to an aerodrome. The additional benefit that it was located only 100 km (62 mi) north of Halifax.

On August 9, 1940, the 6th Field Company Canadian Engineers arrived at the site and began work at clearing the forests and laying out what would become the Debert Military Camp (also referred to as Camp Debert). Employing 6,000 civilians and thousands more military members, the engineers cleared the trees and burnt the plain before building streets, sewer and water services, electricity, and buildings over an area of 80 km^{2} (31 sq mi). The camp was bisected with named avenues and numbered streets having innumerable quonset huts, mess halls, warehouses, canteens, and other buildings. At one point during its construction period, the camp housed more troops than the population of neighbouring Truro at the time.

The surrounding community of Debert grew rapidly with movie houses, restaurants, bars and other businesses being set up and the economic effects spilling over into Truro.

Camp Debert was the final staging area for units embarking from Halifax and was the location where the majority of troops received and trained with their personal weapons. For these purposes a large ammunition depot was built as well as extensive firing ranges. Component units arrived at Camp Debert from across Canada and were organized into larger formations before being carried by trains to troopships at Halifax, usually at night in black-out conditions.

All five divisions of the First Canadian Army were housed (all, or in part) at Camp Debert prior to departure for the European Theatre during the Second World War. In addition, the 7th Canadian Infantry Division of Atlantic Command was formed at Camp Debert, although its volunteer troops went overseas as reinforcements rather than an intact combat unit.

Following the war, Camp Debert was used in the repatriation of troops returning from Europe before undergoing significant downsizing with the majority of training and marshalling areas being decommissioned. In 1948, Camp Debert was reactivated and hosted several active army units during the 1950s.

== Regiments formerly serving in Camp Debert ==
The regiments are listed in chronological order from date of arrival:

- North Nova Scotia Highlanders (August 1939)
- 6th Field Company Canadian Engineers (1940–1941)
- 16th Field Company, RCE (1940–41)
- 22nd Field Ambulance (1940)
- 44th Field Battery, RCA (1940–41)
- The Canadian Grenadier Guards (1940)
- 1st Battalion, Canadian Scottish Regiment (June 1940 – August 25, 1941)
- Royal Winnipeg Rifles (July 1940 – August 1941)
- The Regina Rifle Regiment (September 1940 – August 25, 1941)
- 12th Field Regiment, RCA (January 16, 1941 – July 19, 1941)
- 13th Field Regiment, RCA (January 16, 1941 – July 19, 1941)
- 14th Field Regiment, RCA (January 16, 1941 – July 19, 1941)
- 3rd Anti-Tank Regiment, RCA (January 16, 1941 – July 19, 1941)
- The Stormont, Dundas and Glengarry Highlanders (January 1941 – July 18, 1941)
- Highland Light Infantry of Canada (February 1941 – July 18, 1941)
- 16th Anti-Aircraft Battery (February 9, 1941 – April 5, 1941)
- North Nova Scotia Highlanders (May 14, 1941 – July 18, 1941)
- Halifax Rifles (July 18, 1941 – August 7, 1941)
- 1st Battalion, The Grey and Simcoe Foresters (August 7, 1941 – February 7, 1942)
- Lake Superior Regiment (August 11, 1941 – February 5, 1942)
- The Irish Regiment of Canada (August 14, 1941 – December 1, 1941)
- 4th Canadian (Armoured) Division (October 4, 1941 – August 21, 1942)
- The Fort Garry Horse (October 1941 – November 9, 1941)
- 16th/22nd Saskatchewan Horse (November 20, 1941 – April 9, 1942)
- The British Columbia Regiment (Duke of Connaught's Own Rifles) (November 1941)
- Princess Louise Fusiliers (January 30, 1942 – April 6, 1942)
- The South Alberta Regiment (January 1942 – August 1942)
- The Elgin Regiment (March 18, 1942 – August 20, 1942)
- 14th Anti-Aircraft Battery (April 9, 1942 – June 1942)
- 18th Anti-Aircraft Battery (April 20, 1942 – June 28, 1942)
- 24th Anti-Aircraft Battery (April 28, 1942 – June 2, 1942)
- 27th Anti-Aircraft Battery (April 28, 1942 – June 22, 1942)
- 18th Armoured Car Regiment (12th Manitoba Dragoons) (June 1942)
- Lake Superior Regiment (June 24, 1942 – August 20, 1942)
- The Princess of Wales' Own Regiment (June 1942)
- Princess Louise Fusiliers (August 9, 1942 – October 26, 1942)
- Le Régiment de Québec (August 26, 1942 – August 7, 1943)
- Le Régiment de Montmagny (August 28, 1942 – September 30, 1943)
- 3rd Battalion, The Royal Winnipeg Rifles (September 27, 1942 – August 15, 1943)
- 3rd Battalion, The Queen's Own Rifles of Canada (September 28, 1942 – June 16, 1943)
- 2nd/10th Dragoons (September 30, 1942 – January 4, 1943)
- Les Fusiliers de Sherbrooke (September 30, 1942 – October 13, 1943)
- The Windsor Regiment 7th division (October 1942)
- 7th Canadian Infantry Division (1943)
- Le Régiment de Joliette (January 6, 1943 – February 1943)
- The Algonquin Regiment (February 1943 – June 10, 1943)
- No. 2 Port Company, RCASC (March 18, 1944 – November 30, 1944)
- No. 2 Transit Camp (August 1, 1944 – March 31, 1946)
- 1st Anti-Aircraft Searchlight Battery (August 7, 1944 – September 21, 1945)
- No. 1 Ordnance Ammunition Depot (October 1, 1946 – November 16, 1947)
- No. 31 Ordnance Ammunition Depot (November 17, 1947 – June 1965)
- 3rd Regiment, Royal Canadian Horse Artillery (1948–1958)
- 12th Regional Ordnance Depot (1948–1958)
- 31st Ordnance Ammunition Depot (1948–1965)
- Royal Highland Regiment of Canada (1950–1952)
- 720 Communication Squadron (1964 – October 3, 1985)

== RCAF Station Debert ==
In the fall of 1938 the Royal Air Force (RAF) purchased land for constructing an aerodrome on the north shore of Cobequid Bay near the farming community of Debert.

Construction of the aerodrome, which would host the RAF's No. 31 Operational Training Unit (O.T.U.), began in the fall of 1940 and was completed in April 1941, coinciding with the construction of the army's adjoining Camp Debert. The airfield itself consisted of three 5000 ft runways arranged in an overlapping triangle.

31 O.T.U was one of several similar facilities constructed in the Maritime provinces in support of the British Commonwealth Air Training Plan and RAF Ferry Command. Aircrew trained at Debert to ferry newly manufactured aircraft from the United States and Canada across the Atlantic. Aircrew were trained on the Lockheed Hudson and de Havilland Mosquito.

No. 31 OTU was later taken over by the Royal Canadian Air Force (RCAF) in 1944 and re-designated No. 7 O.T.U. After the cessation of hostilities in Europe, RCAF Debert briefly hosted 420 and 425 Squadrons as part of Tiger Force, a long-range Commonwealth bomber group formed to strike against Japan. 420 and 425 operated Avro Lancaster bombers as training aircraft to prepare for their new role. Tiger Force was disbanded after Japan's surrender in September. RCAF Station Debert closed soon after but was still owned and maintained by the RCAF.

=== Aerodrome ===
In approximately 1942 the aerodrome was listed as RCAF Aerodrome - Debert, Nova Scotia at 45°25′N 63°28′W with a variation of 24 degrees west and elevation of 130 ft (40 m). The field was listed as "All hard surfaced" and had three runways listed as follows:

Runway Name	Length	Width	Surface
6/24	5,000 ft (1,500 m)	150 ft (46 m)	Hard Surfaced
10/28	5,000 ft (1,500 m)	150 ft (46 m)	Hard Surfaced
16/34	5,000 ft (1,500 m)	150 ft (46 m)	Hard Surfaced

=== Relief landing field - Maitland ===
The relief landing field for RCAF Station Debert was located near the village of Maitland. In approximately 1942 the aerodrome was listed as RCAF Aerodrome - Maitland, Nova Scotia at 45°20′N 63°32′W with a variation of 23.5 degrees west and no elevation was specified. The field was listed as "Hard under construction" and had one runway listed as follows:

Runway Name	Length	Width	Surface
3/21	4,000 ft (1,200 m)	200 ft (61 m)	Hard

=== Postwar ===
Following the closure, the aerodrome at Debert underwent some downsizing but continued to support active flight operations as a training, refuelling, and maintenance base until 1954 even though no operational squadrons were stationed there.

In 1960, the RCAF transferred its aerodrome to the Royal Canadian Navy (RCN) which used the facility for aircraft carrier landing practise in support of naval aviation aircraft stationed at nearby Royal Canadian Naval Air Station (RCNAS) Shearwater. Also in the 1960s, some unused hangar space at the aerodrome was used to house a medical equipment supply depot which was used by all three branches of the armed forces.

On February 1, 1968, the merger of the three service branches into the unified Canadian Forces saw the end of flight operations at the Debert aerodrome and in 1971 the Department of National Defence designated 4,800 acres (19 km^{2}), consisting of the aerodrome and the majority of the training area used by the former Camp Debert, as surplus. The provincial government purchased this land for development into the "Debert Air Industrial Park" while the aerodrome continues to be used as a municipal airfield, known as Debert Airport.

== Maritime "Diefenbunker” ==
In 1958, at the height of the Cold War and the infancy of the ICBM threat, Debert was selected as the site for 1 of 6 communication centres and "Regional Emergency Government Headquarters" complexes being located across Canada. The Debert facility would be the only such complex built in the Maritime provinces.

A small part of Camp Debert was proposed to be used for the complex along with supporting surface structures and personnel housing. Construction began in 1960 on an underground 2-storey bunker (approximately half the size of the CEGHQ, located in Carp, Ontario) capable of withstanding a near-hit from a nuclear explosion (an approximate 1–1.5 mi (1.6–2.4 km) radius). The underground building had blast doors at the surface, as well as extensive air filters (mainly against biological, chemical and radioactive contaminants). Underground storage was built for food, fuel, fresh water, and other supplies for the facility which was capable of supporting 350 people for 90 days. These blast shelters, nicknamed "Diefenbunkers", were administered by the Royal Canadian Corps of Signals.

Opening in 1964, the Debert facility was already outdated, since ICBM targeting had improved to the point where a direct hit was possible on the bunker. However the site persisted as a Provincial Warning Centre (for Nova Scotia), staffed by the 720 Communication Squadron, along with the space for the emergency government. Antenna farms were dispersed from the bunker and were located on the shores of Cobequid Bay in nearby Masstown as well as in the Cobequid Hills near Londonderry.

On February 1, 1968, the merger of the three service branches into the Canadian Forces saw the Diefenbunker and support facilities, the last remnants of Camp Debert, change its name to Canadian Forces Station Debert (CFS Debert), in keeping with the naming convention for minor military facilities across Canada.

In the 1970s, CFS Debert, as with most Diefenbunker facilities across the country, was downgraded further as the number of personnel were reduced. Attempts to find other uses for the remaining military facilities took place through the 1980s with militia reserve units training at CFS Debert.

In 1982 CFS Debert was equipped with Telegraph Automated Relay Equipment (TARE) which was used to relay communications received at the nearby Satellite Ground Terminal Folly Lake.

The end of the Cold War and reduction in the ICBM threat, as well as the Diefenbunker's obsolescence, saw all remaining military personnel removed from CFS Debert by the mid-1990s. In 1998 the Department of National Defence finished all environmental assessments and decommissioned the facility, transferring the facility to "Colchester Park", a local development authority.

Today the only remnant of a once-vast military presence in Debert is a firing range used by militia reserve units from Cumberland, Colchester and Pictou counties.

In 1985 the Royal Canadian Air Cadets began to use the airfield for glider training. The first year saw air tow and winch operations, later years used a significant amount of auto tow supplemented with air tow launches. The regional gliding school used the agricultural college in Truro for the ground school, administration and dormitories.

In 2005, the Royal Canadian Air Cadets used the Diefenbunker for its Regional Gliding School (Atlantic) Headquarters. Air cadets from Atlantic Canada ranging in age from 15 to 18 trained at the adjacent Debert Airport for the Advanced Aviation Course and Glider Pilot Scholarship programs.

In December 2008 the 64,000 ft^{2} (5,900 m^{2}) Diefenbunker was sold by the Colchester Regional Development Association to a private data warehousing and data centre co-location services provider, Bastionhost. Bastionhost was going to renovate the facility as a high-density, groundwater-cooled data centre.

In November 2012 the Diefenbunker was sold again by the Municipality of the County of Colchester to recover unpaid taxes from the previous owner, Dataville Farms Ltd. It was purchased by Jonathan Baha'i for $31,300 along with the adjoining parking lot for $4150. The new owner has indicated he intends to use the facility for a data centre with an emphasis on cloud storage. Other parts of the facility may be used for unspecified research and development. In 2013, a part of the bunker was used to film an independent movie, Bunker 6. It was also used for a paintball game.

The previous CBC Studio located in the bunker has been turned into a media recording studio called Top Secret Sounds.

June 2014 the official website for the Debert Diefenbunker revealed the intent to offer leased space within the bunker including self-storage.

== Debert Military Museum ==
The Debert Military Museum maintains Debert's military history with a nineteen-room museum located in "Colchester Park". The museum is a registered charity and is managed by a volunteer board of directors. The museum has a diverse collection of military memorabilia from both World Wars as well as the Cold War and Korean War. The Debert Military Museum is the only museum in Canada that houses a display of Russian photographs presented to the Museum by the Russian Ambassador of Canada. The museum features items donated by members and family members of the Canadian and British militaries, including uniforms, decorations, communications equipment and documents. It no longer offers tours of the Debert Bunker, while still retaining information and artifacts about it.
