= Debert =

Human settlement in Nova Scotia, Canada

Coordinates: 45°26′12.9″N 63°27′23.3″W

Debert in Nova Scotia.

Debert (English: /dəˈbɜːrt/ də-BURT; 2006 pop: 1,471) is an unincorporated farming community in Nova Scotia, Canada. Located in the central-western part of Colchester County, it is approximately 20 km (12 mi) west of Truro.

The community has two churches (United Baptist Church and United Church of Canada), Royal Canadian Legion (Branch 106), a skating rink, a community centre, two vehicle repair garages, one convenience store, and a volunteer fire department.

Debert is situated near coal and iron ore deposits that were mined in the 19th and early 20th centuries. Debert became a station stop on the Halifax-Montreal mainline of the Intercolonial Railway in the 1870s. This railway line continues to this day under the ownership of Canadian National Railway (CN Rail), with passenger service provided by Via Rail, but without a stop at Debert.

== Military history ==
During the Second World War Debert was the location of a Canadian Army base named Debert Military Camp and an adjoining Royal Canadian Air Force station named RCAF Station Debert. Camp Debert was an army facility capable of accommodating division-size units where personnel received training prior to deployment to Europe. RCAF Station Debert was used as a British Commonwealth Air Training Plan facility which saw pilots and aircrew from Commonwealth nations trained for military service.

Demobilization of the military during the post-war brought about many other changes at Camp Debert with many of the barrack buildings and workshops being demolished. Many materials were salvaged from the demolition and reused to help construct numerous new homes in the nearby village of Debert and throughout this part of Colchester County.

For a brief period shortly after the war, the Nova Scotia Agricultural College (NSAC) operated out of the old Camp Debert hospital. The temporary relocation of NSAC resulted from a major fire that had occurred at the principal campus in Bible Hill, which destroyed many barns and academic facilities.

Camp Debert's role as a training facility was eliminated in the early 1950s with the opening of the much larger Camp Gagetown in New Brunswick. The airfield (Debert Airport) was downgraded at this time to an adjunct facility for RCAF Station Shearwater.

A new lease on life was given to the military facility in the early 1960s when Camp Debert was chosen as the location for a Regional Emergency Government Headquarters, also known as a "Diefenbunker". This facility became the focus of the newly formed CFS Debert by the late 1960s.

The primary unit attached to CFS Debert was the 720 Communications Squadron, which maintained the REGHQ and provided communications support to Canadian Armed Forces units throughout Atlantic Canada and around the world. Substantial radio transmitter and receiver stations were constructed close to the nearby villages of Masstown and Great Village to support the military operations at CFS Debert, providing worldwide radio communications.

In 1971 the aerodrome and training facilities were declared surplus and were purchased by the provincial government to create the "Debert Air Industrial Park" as well as a municipal airfield.

CFS Debert was closed in the mid-1990s and decommissioned in 1998 with remaining military facilities being transferred to a local development authority named "Colchester Park". The ongoing residual military communications role of Debert was transferred to the transmitter/receiver facilities near Great Village and Masstown.

The Debert Airport is now also the location of Royal Canadian Air Cadets Summer Glider Scholarship program for the Atlantic region. More than 50 cadets earn their Transport Canada Glider Pilot License during a 6-week course each summer. The Debert Airport also offers the Advanced Aviation Course through Royal Canadian Air Cadets as of summer 2011.

== Paleo-Indian discovery ==
A significant Paleo-Indian site was discovered on the grounds of the old military camp by a private contractor who was preparing a plot of land to be used as a tree farm. Researchers from Saint Mary's University were requested to conduct a thorough archeological excavation on the site. Preliminary reports suggested that the site held evidence of human activity that pre-dated any other sites found within the northern part of Nova Scotia.

The site was designated a National Historic Site of Canada on 19 October 1972.

== Climate ==
Debert has a humid continental climate (Dfb) with warm, wet summers with cool nights and long, cold, and very snowy winters. Debert's inland position gives it some of the warmest summer days in all of Nova Scotia, but also gives it some of the chilliest winter nights.

Climate data for Debert, 1991–2020 normals, extremes 1945–present
Month	Jan	Feb	Mar	Apr	May	Jun	Jul	Aug	Sep	Oct	Nov	Dec	Year
Record high °C (°F)	16.5 (61.7)	15.9 (60.6)	19.4 (66.9)	23.9 (75.0)	31.5 (88.7)	33.9 (93.0)	33.9 (93.0)	35.0 (95.0)	33.1 (91.6)	26.7 (80.1)	22.8 (73.0)	18.0 (64.4)	35.0 (95.0)
Mean daily maximum °C (°F)	−1.4 (29.5)	−0.9 (30.4)	3.1 (37.6)	9.4 (48.9)	16.1 (61.0)	21.0 (69.8)	25.0 (77.0)	24.4 (75.9)	20.1 (68.2)	13.6 (56.5)	7.6 (45.7)	1.9 (35.4)	11.7 (53.1)
Daily mean °C (°F)	−6.7 (19.9)	−6.2 (20.8)	−2.0 (28.4)	4.0 (39.2)	9.9 (49.8)	14.8 (58.6)	18.9 (66.0)	18.3 (64.9)	14.2 (57.6)	8.3 (46.9)	3.2 (37.8)	−2.7 (27.1)	6.2 (43.2)
Mean daily minimum °C (°F)	−12.0 (10.4)	−11.6 (11.1)	−7.1 (19.2)	−1.5 (29.3)	3.6 (38.5)	8.6 (47.5)	12.7 (54.9)	12.1 (53.8)	8.2 (46.8)	2.9 (37.2)	−1.3 (29.7)	−7.2 (19.0)	0.6 (33.1)
Record low °C (°F)	−35.0 (−31.0)	−34.0 (−29.2)	−30.0 (−22.0)	−19.8 (−3.6)	−6.5 (20.3)	−3.2 (26.2)	2.5 (36.5)	0.8 (33.4)	−5.0 (23.0)	−9.0 (15.8)	−18.0 (−0.4)	−32.5 (−26.5)	−35.0 (−31.0)
Average precipitation mm (inches)	91.0 (3.58)	77.1 (3.04)	81.4 (3.20)	90.4 (3.56)	89.3 (3.52)	98.7 (3.89)	87.5 (3.44)	91.9 (3.62)	118.9 (4.68)	117.5 (4.63)	113.7 (4.48)	121.3 (4.78)	1,178.5 (46.40)
Average snowfall cm (inches)	38.8 (15.3)	35.1 (13.8)	32.2 (12.7)	8.7 (3.4)	0.7 (0.3)	0.0 (0.0)	0.0 (0.0)	0.0 (0.0)	0.0 (0.0)	0.0 (0.0)	10.1 (4.0)	31.9 (12.6)	157.5 (62.0)
Average precipitation days (≥ 0.2 mm)	16.7	15.0	15.0	14.9	16.2	14.8	13.8	14.6	14.6	14.8	16.7	18.3	185.5
Average snowy days (≥ 0.2 cm)	9.2	8.0	6.3	1.9	0.11	0.0	0.0	0.0	0.0	0.0	2.4	7.0	34.8
Average relative humidity (%) (at 15:00 LST)	72.0	68.2	61.9	58.2	58.7	62.2	61.7	60.3	62.3	65.8	70.4	74.5	64.7
Source: Environment Canada (snow 1981–2010)
