= Atlantic Command =

Atlantic Command may refer to:

- United States Atlantic Command, 1947–99, U.S. Naval command responsible for guarding the Atlantic shipping lanes during the Cold War
- Atlantic Command (Canadian Army), 1940–44, Canadian Army formation responsible for Atlantic coastal defense
- Canadian Northwest Atlantic Command, 1942–45, Allied command responsible for protecting the shipping lanes across the North Atlantic
- Allied Command Atlantic, 1953–2003, NATO command in charge of guarding the Atlantic shipping lanes during the Cold War
