= Farm Gate =

Farm Gate may refer to:

- Farmgate, a neighbourhood in Dhaka, named after a historical farm gate at that location.
- Farmgate, a 2022 scandal involving the theft of money from South African president Ramaphosa's game farm in 2020.
- Operation Farm Gate, a United States Air Force operation during the Vietnam War.
- Farm gate value, the net value of an agricultural good when it leaves an agricultural operation.
- Farm gate marketing, a form of direct marketing strategy employed by agricultural producers.
- Farm gate, a gate at the entrance to a farm
