= Farm gate marketing =

Direct marketing method

Farm gate marketing or farmgate sales describes a direct marketing method whereby farmers sell agricultural produce—mostly food—directly to the consumer, to restaurants and caterers, and to independent retailers. Farm gate sales are a common type of marketing found throughout traditional small farming sectors worldwide and, in some countries, account for the vast amount of sales as far as foodstuffs and livestock are concerned.

== Characteristics ==
As the name implies, farm gate sales is a marketing strategy undertaken by the producer near the location where the product is produced. Consumers come to the production unit or farm to buy produce and, in some cases, pick the produce themselves. Examples include the sale of vegetables from a producer's garden, the sale of eggs from an egg production unit, the direct sale of livestock from a ranch, and pick-your-own berries, fruits, and flowers operations. In general, there is no limit to the type of items that can be marketed in this manner, as long as there are willing buyers and local ordinances permit such sales. Sometimes, a very limited number of intermediaries are situated between the farmer and the consumer (see also short food supply chains). Generally, wholesalers and retailers are bypassed, and revenue received from the sales contributes immediately to a farm's income.

In terms of social goals, farmgate sales help to build a direct relationship between the farming community and consumers, as well as fostering respect for food and awareness of how it is produced by consumers. It can also contribute to budget savings by consumers (see also potato movement).

In environmental terms, farmgate sales shorten transport distances and are expected to reduce food waste.

== Sales methods ==
Farmgate sales are most common in the form of either retail outlets in a farm shop, roadside farm stands, or at stands run by farmers at farmers' markets or food fairs. However, other distribution channels are also used, such as door-to-door sales and distance selling–so-called "box schemes"—where farmers take orders by telephone, mail order, or via the internet. Also practised are "pick-your-own" schemes, where farmers invite consumers to pick their own fruit and vegetables.

== Challenges ==
A main challenge for farmgate sales lies in ensuring compliance with food laws (e.g., hygiene rules and labelling requirements), as well as consumer law (information requirements and, at times, the consumer's right to withdraw from a contract of sale). This complex regulatory environment can be difficult to handle for farmers not trained in these areas.

== Regulations ==
Under the heading of "Product of my farm", the European Commission has started to take an interest in promoting farmgate sales and is contemplating a policy that would encourage farmers to engage in direct marketing schemes for their produce. In parts of North America, such as in the Canadian province of British Columbia, regulators began to take an interest in farmgate sales and creating rules to facilitate direct sales from farms in 2009.

== See also ==
- Community-supported agriculture
- Local food
- Short food supply chains
