= Masstown Market =

Market in Nova Scotia, Canada

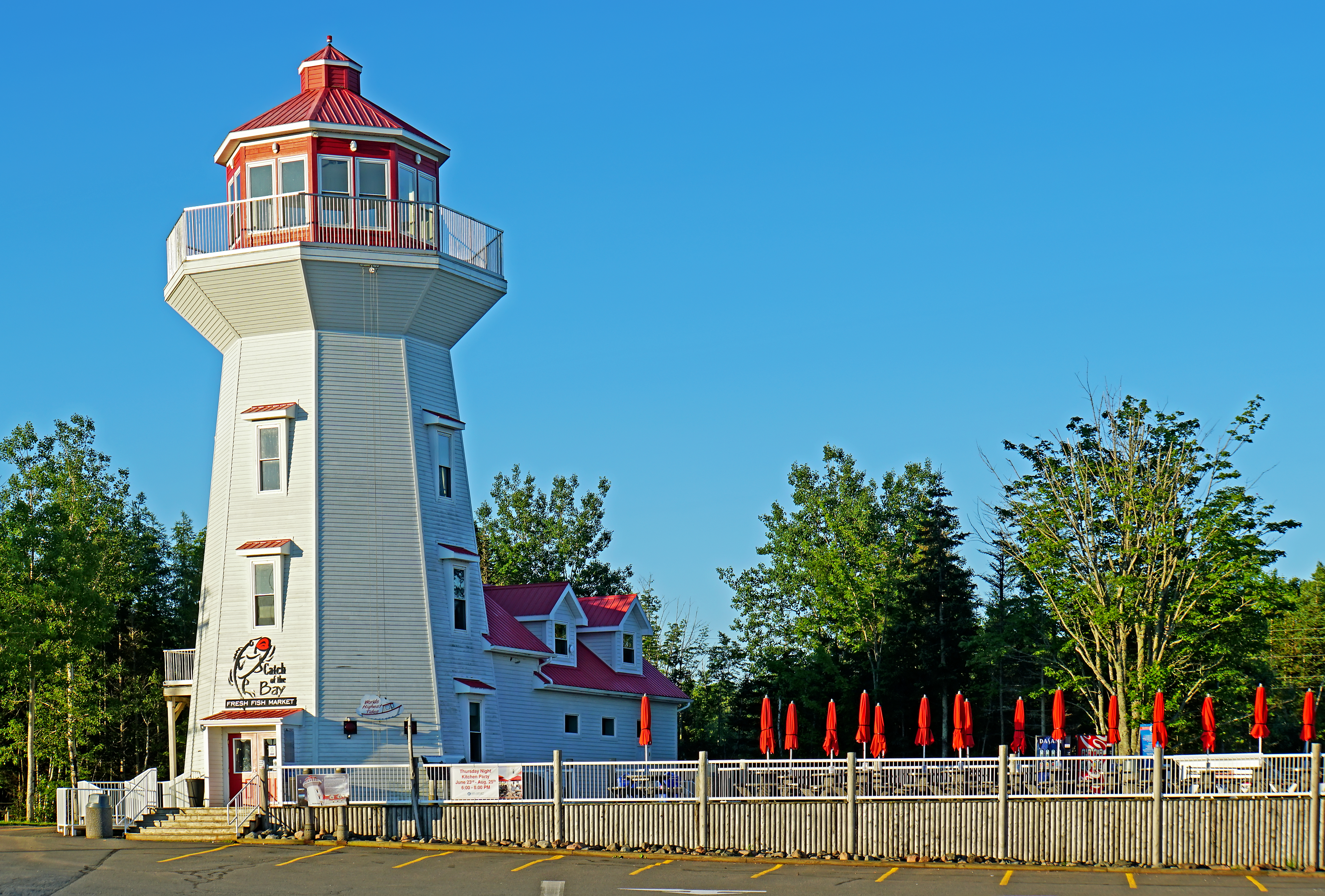
- Fish shop at Masstown Market
- Coordinates: 45.3933°N 63.4960°W
- Address: 10622 Highway 2, Masstown, Nova Scotia
- Opened: 1969
- Previous names: The Fruit Stand
- Owner: Laurie Jennings
- Website: masstownmarket.com

Masstown Market is a shopping area in the Canadian province of Nova Scotia, located in the community of Masstown. A popular destination for tourists and residents of the Maritimes, the market is one of the largest employers in the area. Established in 1969 as a small farm-gate operation, Masstown Market encompasses a large farmer's market, a pharmacy, a creamery and butchery, a fresh fish shop, and a fish and chips restaurant. Laurie Jennings, the owner of Masstown Market, also owns the adjacent gas station and convenience store.

== Description ==
Masstown Market is located just off Highway 104 in the small community of Masstown. The 30,000-square-foot farmer's market has a wide selection of fresh produce, a bakery, gift shop, garden centre, ice cream stand, and an NSLC liquor boutique. In addition to the main market, Masstown Market also has a separate pharmacy, creamery, and butchery. The creamery and pharmacy are located in the same building, opened in August 2018 across the street from the main market. A lighthouse at the market houses their fish shop, and an adjacent boat serves as a fish and chips restaurant in the summer.

Masstown Market is a popular destination for tourists and local customers from across the Maritimes. The market offers a large selection of cheeses and dairy products, as well as locally grown produce; their baked goods are particularly in demand.

== History ==
Masstown Market was established in 1969 by the farmer Eric Jennings as a small farm-gate retailer. Jennings started the business with less than CA$500 of funds; he borrowed some money from his neighbour and business partner to purchase the land for the market, and spent the initial months of operation working to pay him back. Recalling the transaction, Jennings noted that "back then you could do that. You could make a deal with a neighbour on nothing but a handshake."

Initially known as "the fruit stand", Masstown Market benefited from the presence of campgrounds in the area, and the market had expanded threefold by 1973. As a family business, all four of Jennings' sons became involved with the market, each playing a role in its expansion. His son Laurie eventually took over day-to-day operations of the market, but Eric remained involved.

In December 2012, Laurie Jennings purchased and demolished the nearby Masstowner Motel, and subsequently began planning for a new gas station and convenience store. Masstown Market was attracting over one million customers per year by 2013, with a workforce of around 125 people.

A sign resembling the Welcome to Fabulous Las Vegas sign was erected at Masstown Market in 2019. The sign reads "Welcome to Fabulous Masstown, Nova Scotia" and was created by Sid Sells Signs of Truro. The sign drew mixed reactions; some residents thought it was out of place in Masstown, while others expressed their approval.

The market completed a large solar installation in 2023 and began generating 230 kilowatts of energy. Solar panels were installed on the roof of the 15,000-square-foot creamery and butchery building, on ground mounts, and on the pharmacy.

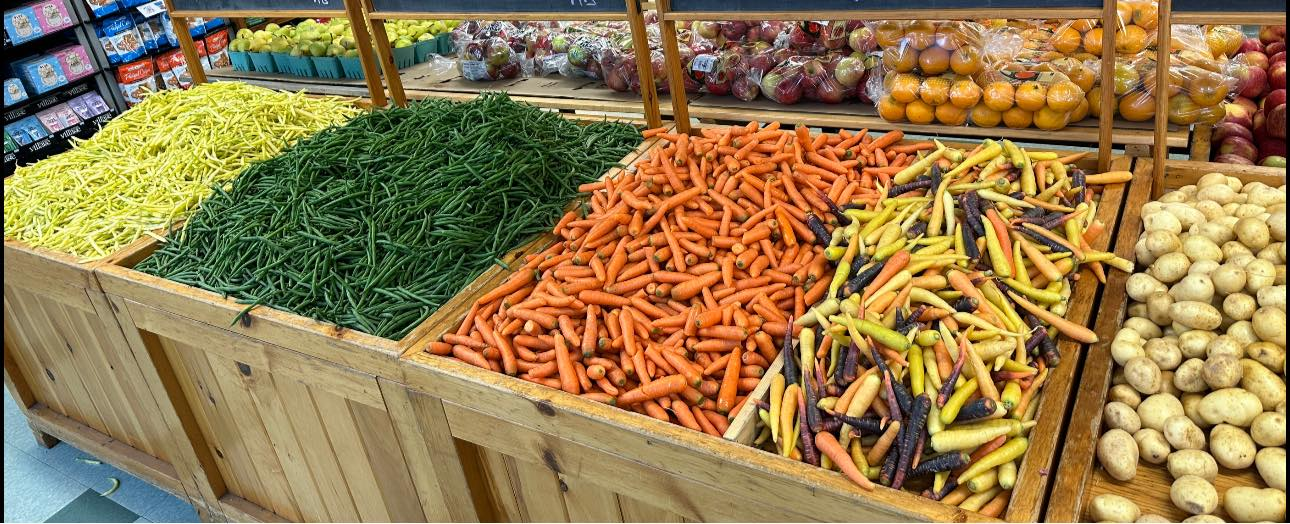
Local produce at Masstown Market

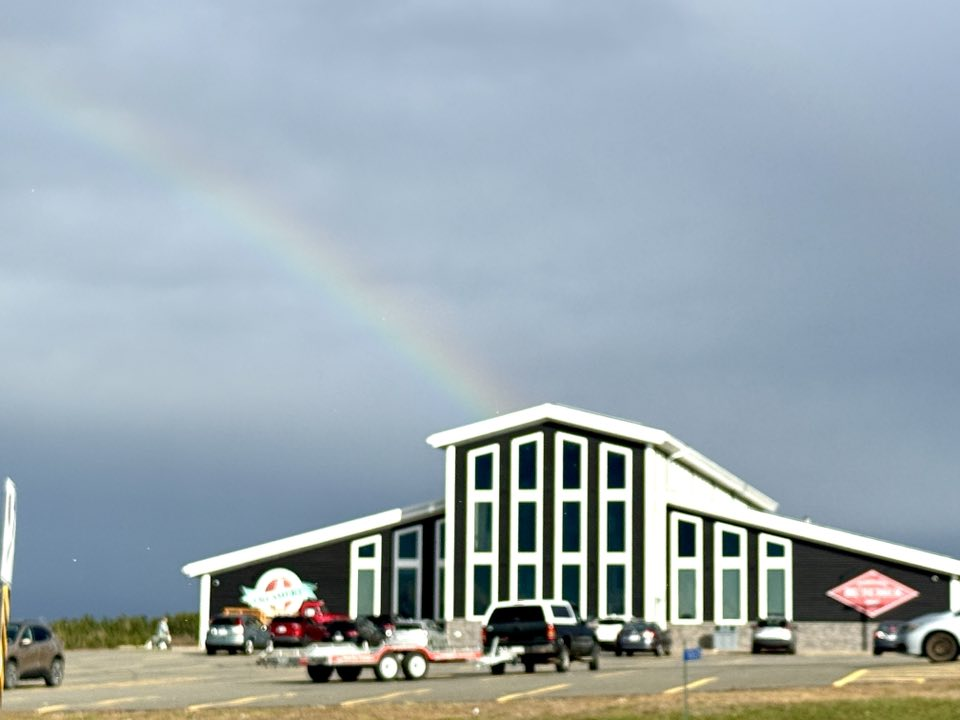
The Masstown Creamery and Butchery
