= Lionel Frank Page =

Lionel Frank Page CB, DSO
- Born: 17 December 1884
- Died: 26 April 1944 (aged 59)
- Children: P. K. Page (daughter)
- Military career
- Allegiance: Canada
- Branch: Canadian Militia / Canadian Army
- Service years: 1906-1944
- Rank: Major General
- Units: 15th Light Horse; 35th Central Alberta Horse; 5th Battalion (Western Cavalry), CEF; Lord Strathcona's Horse (Royal Canadians)
- Commands: 50th Battalion (Calgary), CEF; Lord Strathcona's Horse (Royal Canadians); 4th Canadian Infantry Division; Atlantic Command (Canadian Army)
- Conflicts: First World War; Second World War
- Awards: Companion of the Order of the Bath; Distinguished Service Order and Two Bars

Major-General Lionel Frank Page, CB, DSO & Two Bars (17 December 1884 – 26 April 1944) was a Canadian Army officer who served in both world wars.

== Biography ==
Page was born in Yorkshire and was educated at Berkhamsted School. After failing the entrance examinations for Sandhurst, he came to Canada in 1903 to work on Berkhamsted Farm in Red Deer, Alberta, which trained Berkhamsted graduates to homestead on the Prairies. After a year, he acquired land in Red Deer and became a rancher, selling his ranch in 1912 to enter business.

On the outbreak of the First World War, Page volunteered for overseas service and was part of the first contingent of the Canadian Expeditionary Force. He was appointed Distinguished Service Order in January 1917 and received two bars, the first of which was awarded in June 1918. The second bar appeared in The London Gazette in November 1918 and reads as follows:

For conspicuous gallantry and devotion to duty. He led his battalion with great ability and determination in the attack and capture of a strongly held enemy position. Later, during an enemy counter-attack, he made a reconnaissance of the greatest value, and although both his flanks were in the air he skilfully disposed his men so that they were protected and the counter-attack driven off with heavy loss to the enemy.

During World War II he served as the first General Officer Commanding (GOC) of the 4th Canadian Infantry Division, a post he held from June 1941 until December that year. At the time of his death in April 1944, which was caused by a sudden illness while still in Canada, he was General Officer Commanding-in-Chief, Atlantic Command.

His daughter was the artist P. K. Page.
