= 25th Battalion (Nova Scotia Rifles), CEF =

- The distinguishing patch of the 25th Battalion (Nova Scotia Rifles), CEF
- Active: 7 November 1914-15 September 1920
- Country: Canada
- Branch: Canadian Expeditionary Force
- Role: Infantry
- Size: battalion
- Engagements: First World War

The 25th Battalion (Nova Scotia Rifles), CEF (also known as "MacKenzie Battalion", "Master Raiders", "Raiding Battalion") was a unit in the Canadian Expeditionary Force during the Great War. It was the second infantry battalion (after the 17th) of ten to be raised in Nova Scotia during the war. The 25th served in Belgium and France as part of the 5th Canadian Brigade, 2nd Canadian Division from 16 September 1915 until the end of the war. Regimental headquarters were established at the Halifax Armouries, with recruitment offices in Sydney, Amherst, New Glasgow, Truro and Yarmouth. Of the 1000 Nova Scotians that started with the battalion, after the first year of fighting, 100 were left in the battalion, while 900 men were killed, taken prisoner, missing or injured.

The 25th Battalion was authorized on 7 November 1914 and embarked for Great Britain on 20 May 1915. The battalion was disbanded on 15 September 1920.

The 25th Battalion recruited throughout Nova Scotia and was mobilized at Halifax.

== Commanding officers ==
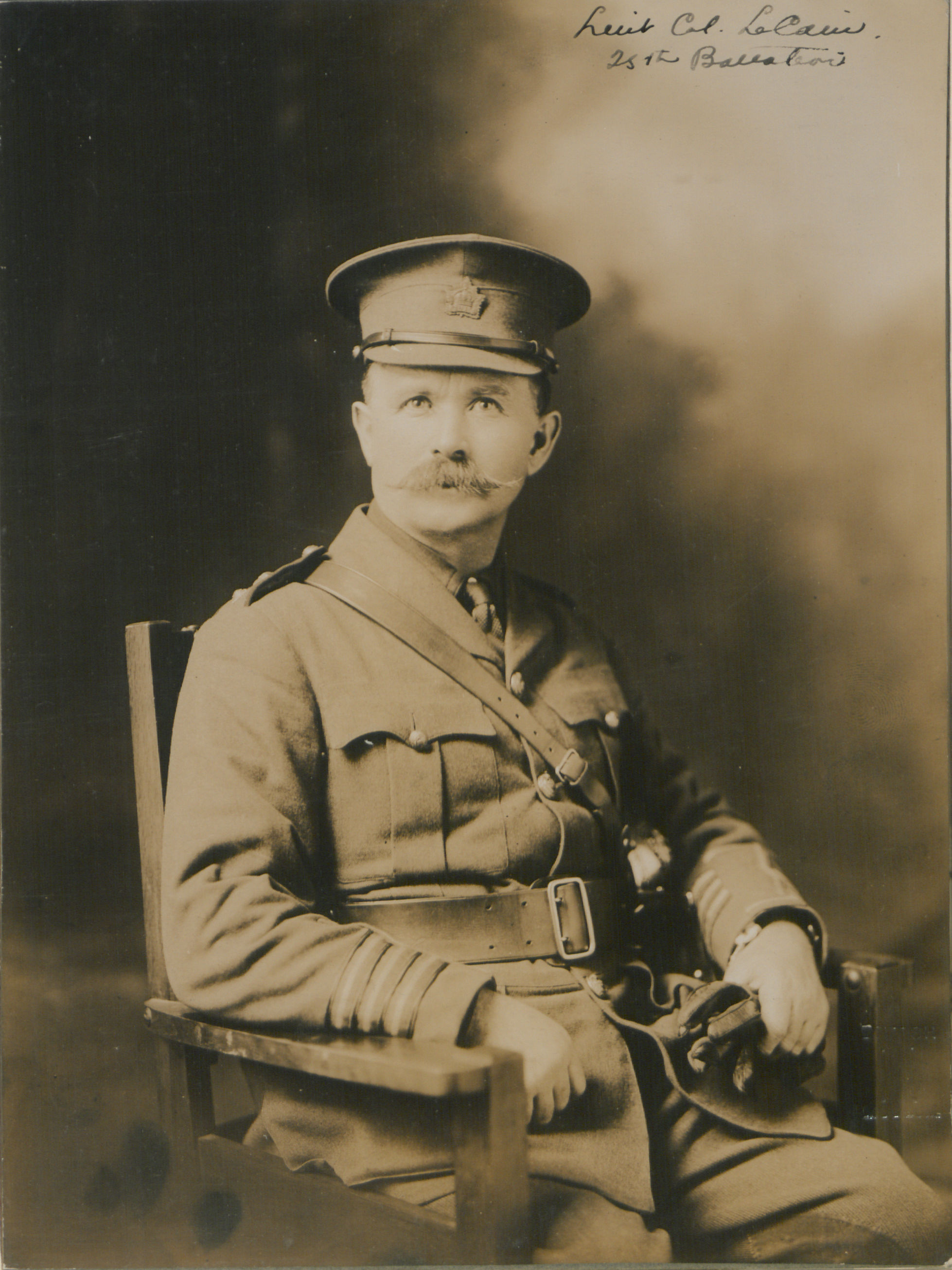
Lt Col Le Cain, 25th Battalion (HS85-10-30083)

The 25th battalion had eight Officers Commanding:

- Lt.-Col. G.A. LeCain, 20 May 1915 – 26 October 1915
- Lt.-Col. E. Hilliam, 26 October 1915 – 18 January 1917
- Maj. J.A. De Lancy, MC, 18 January 1917 – 4 April 1917
- Lt.-Col. D.S. Bauld, DSO, 4 April 1917 – 9 July 1917
- Lt.-Col. A.S. Blois, DSO, 9 July 1917 – 19 April 1918
- Lt.-Col. J.W. Wise, DSO, MC, 19 April 1918 – 8 August 1918
- Lt.-Col. F.P. Day, 9 August 1918 – 13 October 1918
- Lt.Col. C.J. Mersereau, DSO, 13 October 1918-Demobilization

== Battle Honours ==
The 25th Battalion was awarded the following battle honours:

- MOUNT SORREL
- SOMME, 1916, '18
- Flers-Courcelette
- Thiepval
- Ancre Heights
- ARRAS, 1917, '18
- Vimy, 1917
- Arleux
- Scarpe, 1917, '18
- HILL 70
- Ypres 1917
- Passchendaele
- AMIENS
- HINDENBURG LINE
- Canal du Nord
- Cambrai, 1918
- PURSUIT TO MONS
- FRANCE AND FLANDERS, 1915-18

== Belgium (1915-1916) ==
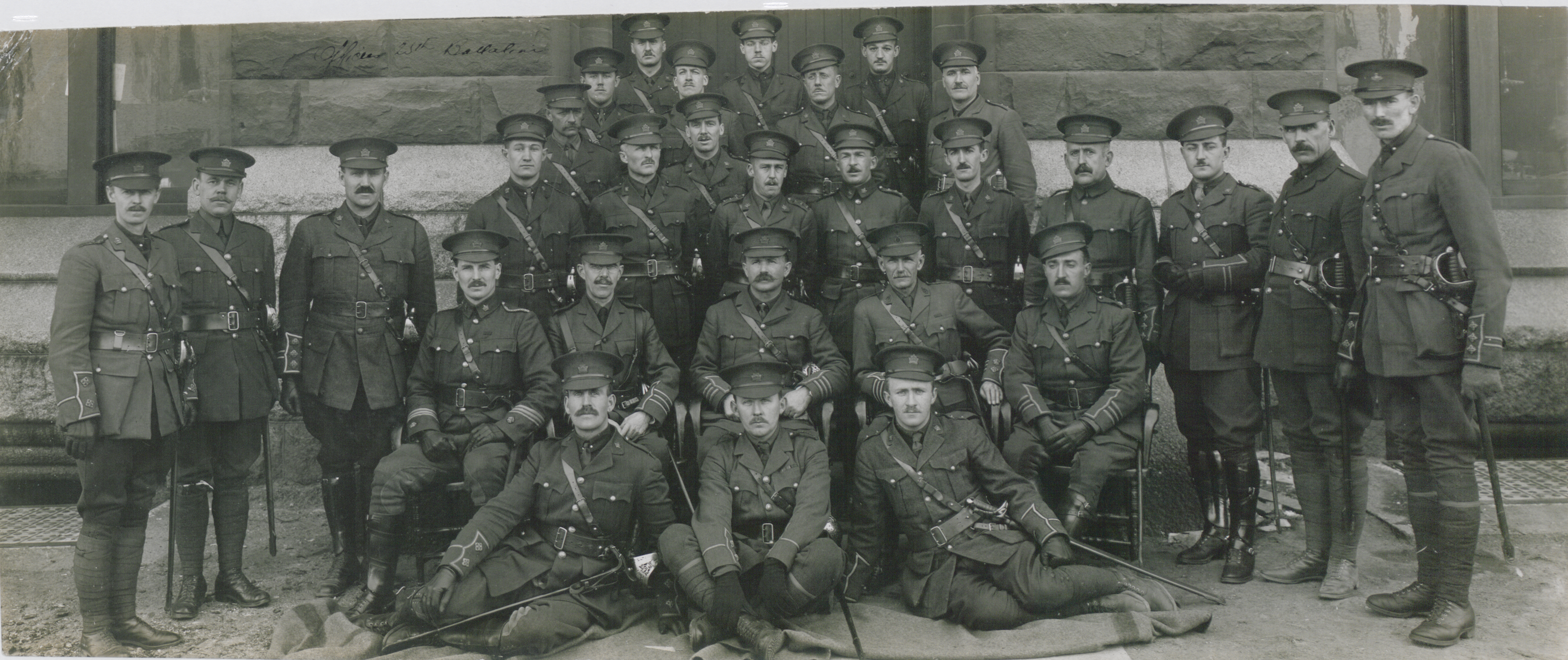
Officers of the Nova Scotia 25th Battalion (HS85-10-29971)

On 22–23 September 1915, the 25th arrived at Ypres, Belgium, becoming the first Nova Scotian battalion to see combat in the war. The battalion spent 339 days in the treacherous Belgian trenches, 164 of which involved front line duty. They fought in the Actions of St. Eloi Craters (27 March – 16 April 1916), at Hill 62, Mount Sorrel and Sanctuary Wood. These battles marked the first occasion in which Canadian divisions engaged in planned offensive operations during World War I. In those actions the Canadians reconquered vital high-ground positions that denied the Germans a commanding view of the town of Ypres itself. Of the 1000 men that started with the battalion, after the first year of fighting 900 men were killed, taken prisoner, missing or injured. (See the Hill 62 Memorial).

== France (1916-1917) ==
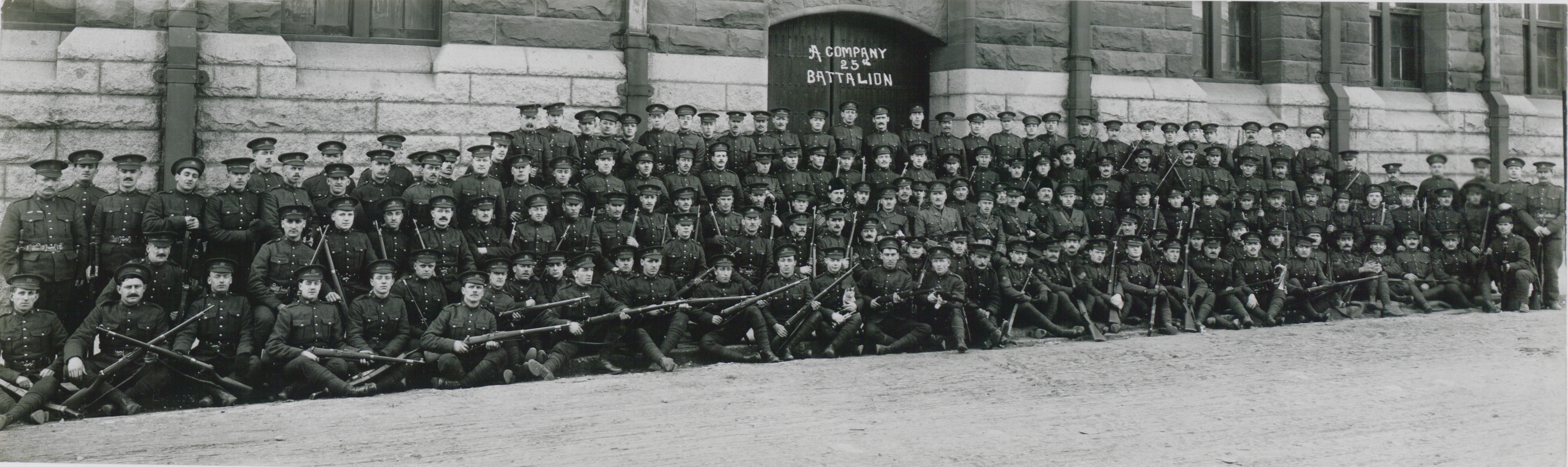
A Company 25th Nova Scotia Battalion (HS85-10-29973)

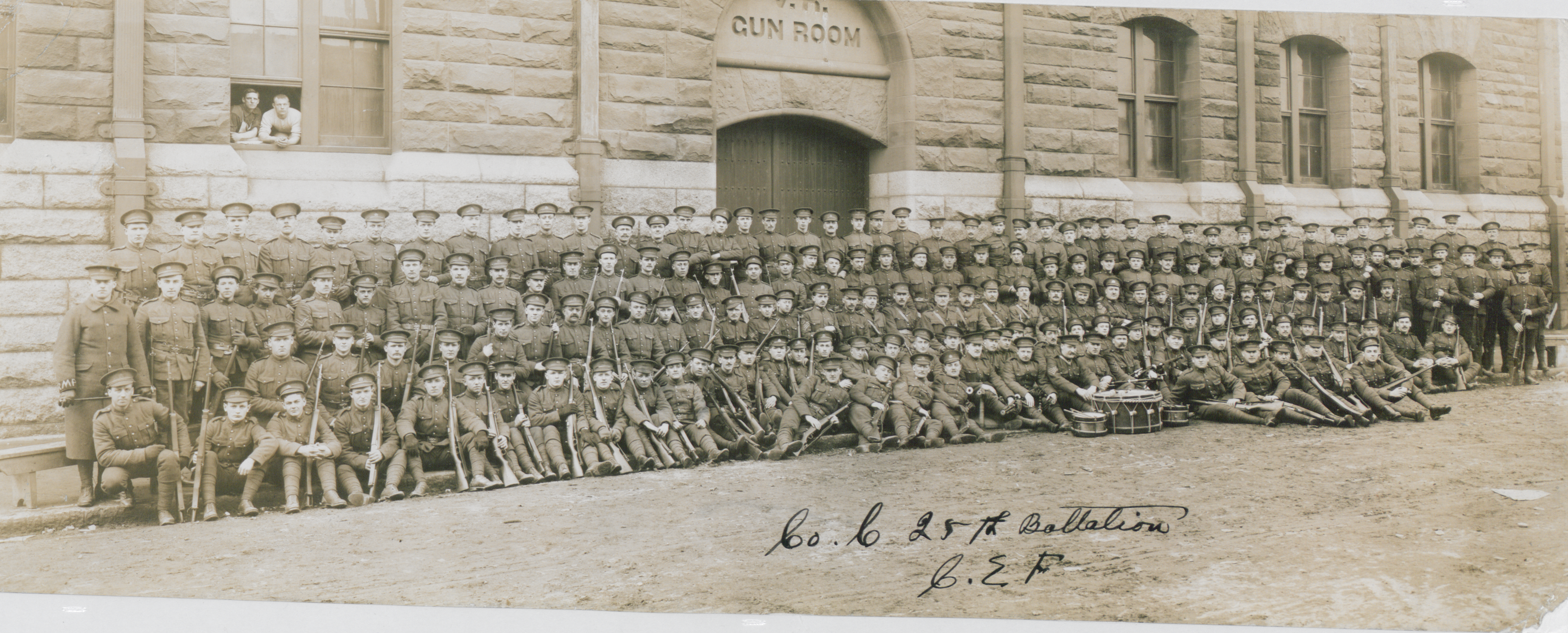
Company C 25th battalion Canadian Expeditionary Force (HS85-10-29978)

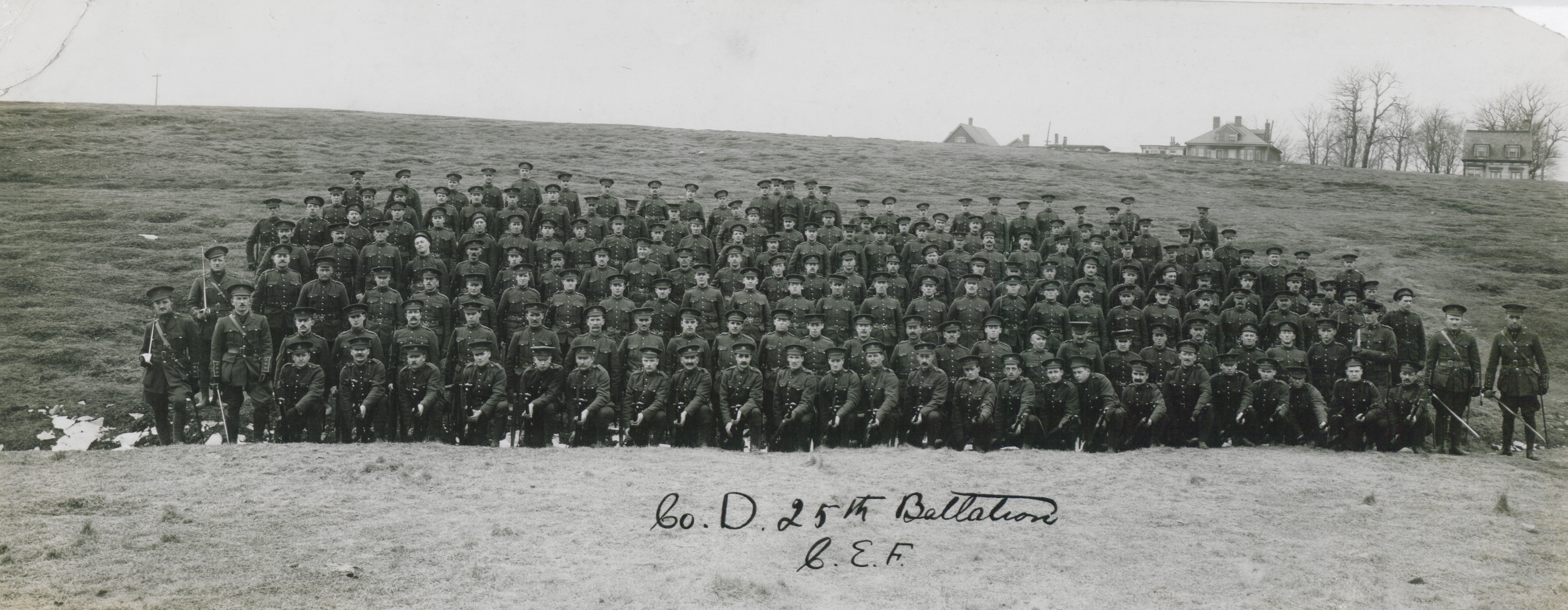
Company D 25th battalion Canadian Expeditionary Force (HS85-10-29979)

=== Battle of the Somme ===
The 25th took part in The Battle of the Somme. The battle took place between 1 July and 18 November 1916 on either side of the River Somme in France. The battle was one of the largest of the war. More than 1,000,000 men were wounded or killed, making it one of humanity's bloodiest battles.

==== Battle of Flers–Courcelette ====
The 25th then took part in the Battle of Flers–Courcelette. The battle was launched on 15 September 1916 and went on for one week. By its conclusion on 22 September, tactical gains had been made in the capture of the villages of Courcelette, Martinpuich and Flers.

The battle is significant for the first use of the tank in warfare. It also marked the debut of the Canadian Division on the Somme battlefield.

- Battle of Thiepval Ridge

==== Battle of the Ancre Heights ====
In the Battle of the Ancre Heights, (Regina Trench) the losses in the 2nd Canadian Division 1 September – 4 October were 6,530.

- Battle of Arras (1917), 18,

==== Battle of Vimy Ridge ====
The Battle of Vimy Ridge was a military engagement fought primarily as part of the Battle of Arras, which took place from 9 to 12 April 1917, was part of the opening phase of the British-led Battle of Arras, a diversionary attack for the French Nivelle Offensive. The objective of the Canadian Corps was to take control of the German-held high ground along an escarpment at the northernmost end of the Arras Offensive. Supported by a creeping barrage, the Canadian Corps captured most of the ridge during the first day of the attack. The town of Thélus fell during the second day of the attack, as did the crest of the ridge once the Canadian Corps overcame a salient of considerable German resistance. The final objective, a fortified knoll located outside the town of Givenchy-en-Gohelle, fell to the Canadian Corps on 12 April. (See Canadian National Vimy Memorial).

=== Canada's Hundred Days ===
The 25th was involved in Canada's Hundred Days.

- Battle of Amiens (1918),
- Battle of the Scarpe (1918)
- Battle of Cambrai (1918) (Part of the Battle of the Hindenburg Line)
- Battle of the Canal du Nord

== Belgium (1917-1918) ==
Flanders (and Belgium as a whole) saw some of the greatest loss of life on the Western Front of the First World War, in particular from the three battles of Ypres. Due to the hundreds of thousands of casualties at Ypres, the poppies that sprang up from the battlefield afterwards, later immortalised in the Canadian poem "In Flanders Fields", written by John McCrae, have become a symbol for lives lost in war.

=== Battle of Passchendaele ===
The Battle of Passchendaele took place between June and November 1917, for control of the ridges south and east of the Belgian city of Ypres. The campaign ended in November when the Canadian Corps captured Passchendaele.

- Battle of Messines (1917)
- Battle of Hill 70,
- Pursuit to Mons,

== Afterward ==
By the end of the war 53% of the men who had served in the battalion had been wounded (2713 soldiers), while 14% died in battle (718 soldiers).

The 25th Battalion is perpetuated by The Nova Scotia Highlanders.

The king's and regimental colours of the battalion are laid up in Government House in Halifax.

== See also ==
- List of infantry battalions in the Canadian Expeditionary Force
- Military history of Nova Scotia

== Sources ==
- Clements, Robert N. Merry Hell: The Story of the 25th Battalion (Nova Scotia Regiment), Canadian Expeditionary Force 1914–1919. Edited by Brian Douglas Tennyson. University of Toronto. 2013
- Nova Scotia's part in the Great War (1920)
- MacDonald, F. B. The Twenty-fifth Battalion, Canadian Expeditionary Force : Nova Scotia's famous regiment in World War One. 1983.
- Miles, W. (1992) [1938]. Military Operations, France and Belgium, 1916: 2nd July 1916 to the End of the Battles of the Somme. History of the Great War Based on Official Documents by Direction of the Historical Section of the Committee of Imperial Defence. Vol. II (Imperial War Museum and Battery Press ed.). London: HMSO. ISBN 978-0-901627-76-6.
- R. Lewis; Over The Top With The 25th (1918)
- C. Stewart; "OVERSEAS" THE LINEAGES AND INSIGNIA OF THE CANADIAN EXPEDITIONARY FORCE 1914–1919 (1970)
- Prior, R.; Wilson, T. (1996). Passchendaele: The Untold Story. Cumberland: Yale University Press. ISBN 978-0-300-07227-3.
- Tennyson, Brian Douglas. Percy Willmot: A Cape Bretoner at War. Cape Breton University Press, 2007.
- Tennyson, Brian Douglas. Nova Scotia at War 1914–1919. Nimbus, 2017.
- Tennyson, Brian Douglas. '"Wild Bill" Livingstone goes to war: a diary and letters 1916-19.' Royal Nova Scotia Historical Society Journal, 12 (2009), 119–144.
- Tennyson, Brian Douglas. "Preparing for war: the 25th Battalion in Halifax, 1914-15." Canadian Military History, 20:1 (Winter 2011), 61–74.
- 25th Battalion War Diary (1914–1919)
