= 5th Canadian Infantry Brigade =

Brigade of the Canadian Army

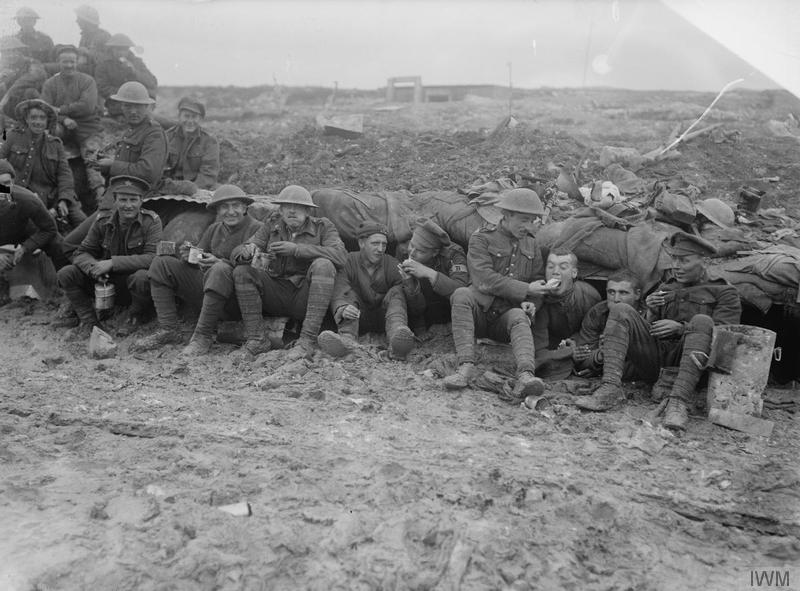
- Canadian troops, possibly of the 25th Battalion (Nova Scotia Rifles), eating rations whilst seated on muddy ground outside a shelter near Pozières, France, during the final stages of the Battle of the Somme, October 1916.
- Active: 1915–1918; 1939–1945
- Country: Canada
- Branch: Canadian Expeditionary Force; Canadian Army
- Type: Infantry
- Size: Brigade
- Part of: 2nd Canadian Infantry Division
- Engagements: World War I; Western Front; World War II; Dieppe Raid; Normandy; The Scheldt; The Rhineland; Battle of Groningen

Commanders
- Notable commanders: Archibald Hayes Macdonell; William J Megill

Insignia
- 2nd Canadian Division Formation Patch

The 5th Canadian Infantry Brigade was an infantry brigade of the Canadian Expeditionary Force in World War I and of the Canadian Army in World War II. Raised in 1915, it formed part of the 2nd Canadian Division and fought on the Western Front during World War I before being disbanded. Later, it was re-raised in September 1939 and subsequently took part in Allied operations in northwest Europe in 1944 and 1945.

== History ==
=== World War I ===
Formed in early 1915, the 5th Brigade formed part of the 2nd Canadian Division that was raised as part of the Canadian Expeditionary Force. Departing Canada in May 1915, further training was conducted in the United Kingdom around Shorncliffe before the brigade was committed to the Western Front in September 1915. The brigade's first major actions commenced early the following year around St Eloi, after which the brigade participated in many significant actions for the next two-and-a-half years that it was deployed along the Western Front.

=== World War II ===
Mobilized on 1 September 1939 as part of the 2nd Canadian Infantry Division, the brigade was formed before the declaration of World War II, and the battalions were promptly fleshed out by volunteers. Further expansion of the brigade was hindered by a temporary halt in recruitment and uncertainty about overseas deployment. Consequently, brigade headquarters were not actually formed until May–June 1940.

After the Dieppe Raid the brigade, with the 2nd Canadian Division, moved to Normandy in time to serve with the British Second Army. They participated in the advance along the Channel Coast with the First Canadian Army, including the liberation of Dieppe. The division saw heavy action in the Netherlands in late 1944, and took part in the final offensives in 1945.

== Units ==
=== World War I ===
During World War I, the brigade consisted of four infantry battalions, as follows:

- 22nd (Canadien Français) Battalion Canadian Infantry: 21 October 1914 – 11 November 1918;
- 24th (Victoria Rifles) Battalion Canadian Infantry: 22 October 1914 – 11 November 1918;
- 25th (Nova Scotia) Battalion Canadian Infantry: 28 October 1914 – 11 November 1918;
- 26th (New Brunswick) Battalion Canadian Infantry: 2 November 1914 – 11 November 1918.

In addition, the brigade was supported by a machine gun company and trench mortar battalion.

Distinguishing patches of 5th Brigade's battalions
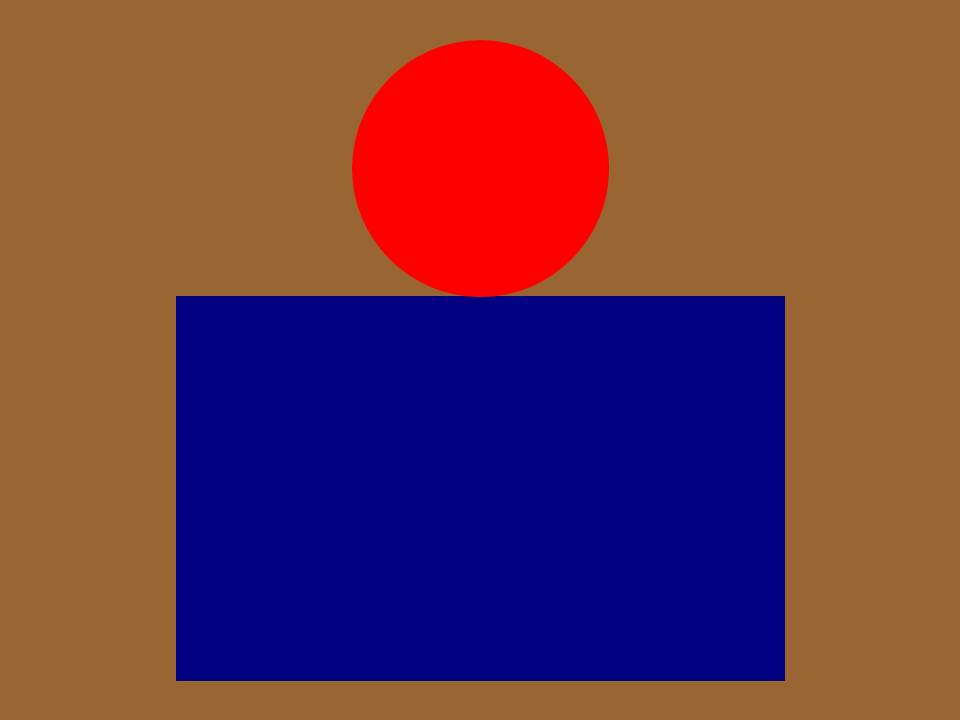
22nd Battalion

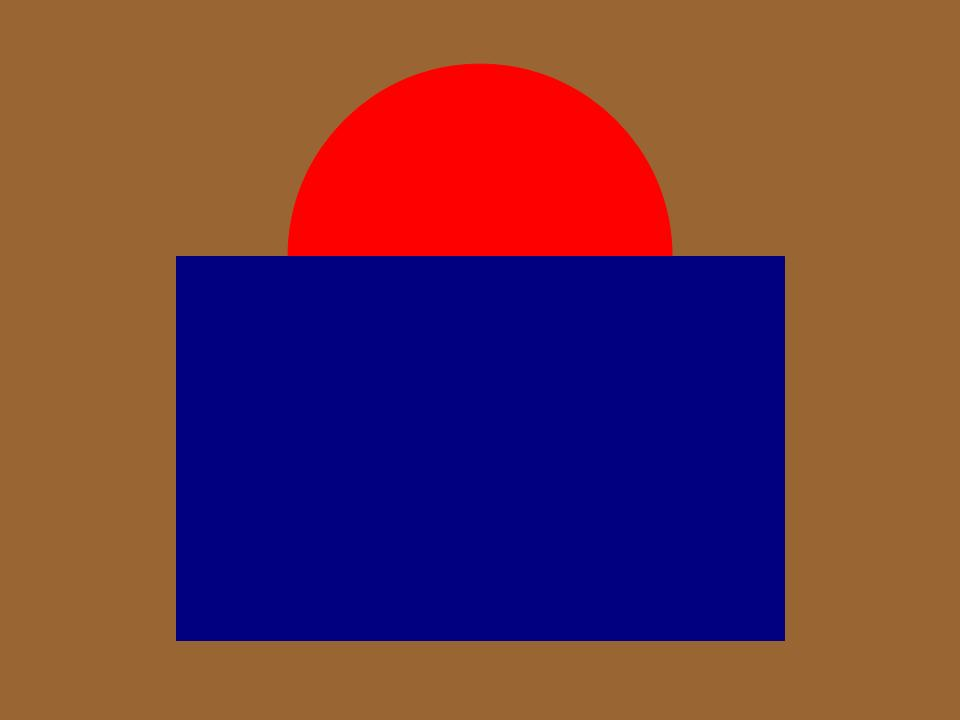
24th Battalion

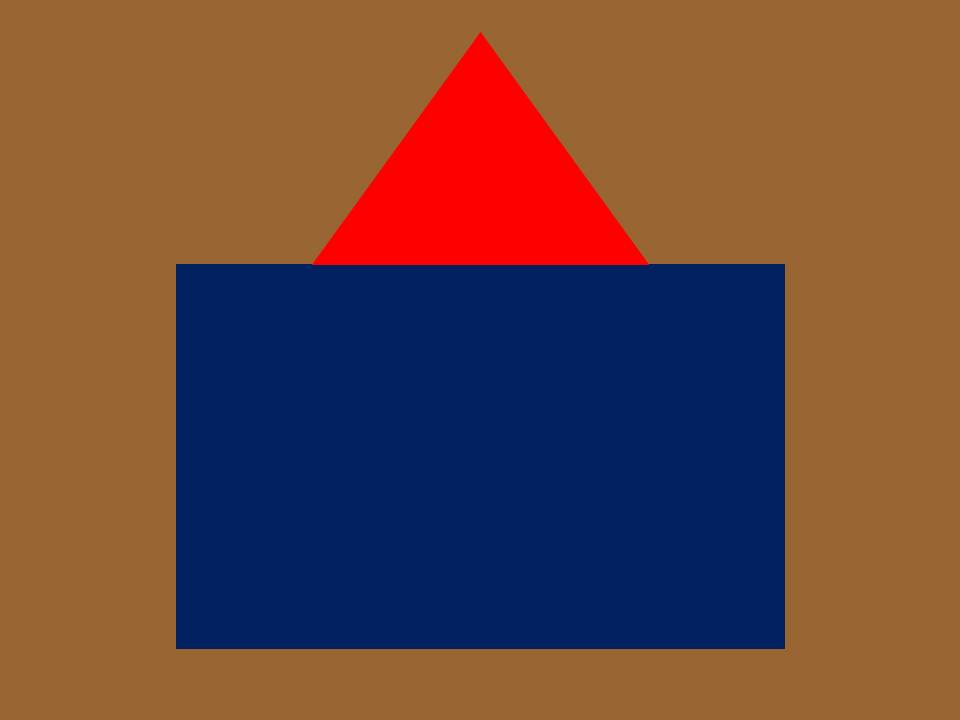
25th Battalion

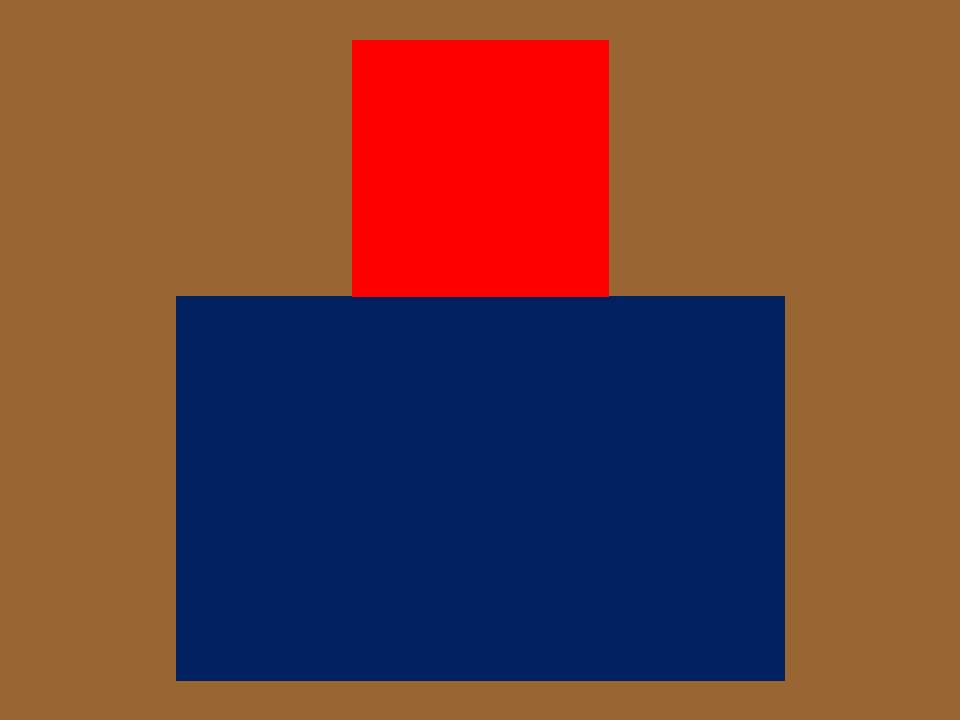
26th Battalion

=== World War II ===
In 1939, the second division was organized along regional lines, like the 1st Canadian Infantry Division. The 5th Infantry Brigade's order of battle upon formation in Quebec was as follows:

- 1st Battalion, The Black Watch (Royal Highland Regiment) of Canada – Montreal, Quebec
- 1st Battalion, Les Fusiliers Mont-Royal – Montreal, Quebec
- 1st Battalion, Le Régiment de Maisonneuve – Montreal, Quebec
- 1st Battalion, Le Régiment de la Chaudière – Lévis, Quebec

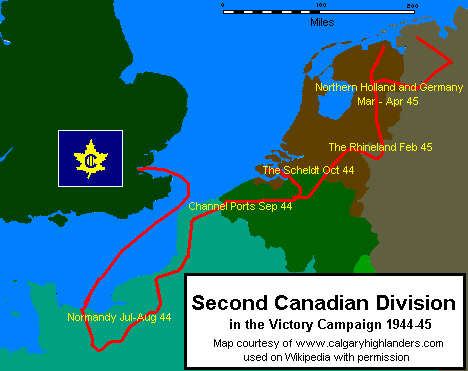
Second Canadian Division in the Victory Campaign 1944–1945.

By 1944–1945, a ground defence platoon had been added to the brigade's order of battle. Provided by the Lorne Scots, this platoon was designated the 5th Infantry Brigade Ground Defence Platoon (Lorne Scots).

== Brigade Commander during the Second World War ==
- Brigadier P.E. Leclerc: 20 May 1940 – 26 March 1941
- Brigadier G.V. Whitehead: 27 March 1941 – 15 January 1944
- Brigadier J.C. Jefferson: 16 January – 26 February 1944
- Brigadier W.J. Megill: 27 February 1944 – 4 June 1945
- (Position Vacant / under Acting Command): 5 June – September 1945 (Disbanded)

== See also ==
- Military history of Canada during World War II
- Military history of Canada
- Canadian Armed Forces
