= 7th Canadian Infantry Division =

- 7th Canadian Infantry Division formation patch
- Active: 12 May 1942–December 1943
- Country: Canada
- Branch: Canadian Army
- Type: Infantry
- Role: Home Defence
- Size: Division
- Part of: Atlantic Command
- Garrison/HQ: Camp Debert and Camp Sussex, New Brunswick
- Engagements: World War II: American theater

Commanders
- Notable commanders: Major-General Pierre Edouard Leclerc

The 7th Canadian Infantry Division was an infantry division of the Canadian Army, mobilized in the spring of 1942 and assigned for home defence within Atlantic Command, during World War II.

== History ==
The 7th Canadian Division was formed on 12 May 1942.

At the time it was assumed it would consist of volunteers and proceed overseas. By the summer of 1942 it became obvious that there would not be enough volunteers, so National Resources Mobilization Act (NRMA) conscripts were assigned to the regiments of the Division to bring their numbers up to war establishment strength.

This meant that the Division could only be used for home defence, unless the Parliament of Canada ruled that conscripted men could be sent overseas. Two brigades were assembled in the early fall of 1942 in Camp Debert in Nova Scotia with the third at Camp Sussex in New Brunswick.

After the end of the Aleutian Islands campaign, the need for home defense units was decreased and the 7th Canadian Division was disbanded in late 1943. Despite the order for disbandment being given on 15 October 1943, the division was not fully disbanded until December 1943.

== Formation patch ==
The formation patch worn by the 7th Canadian Division consisted of a half French grey and half green rectangular patch.

== Order of battle ==
May 1942

- Headquarters, 7th Division
  - 7th Division Intelligence Section
  - No. 7 Field Security Section
  - No. 7 Defence and Employment Platoon (Lorne Scots)

16th Canadian Infantry Brigade

- The Prince of Wales' Own Rangers
- The Oxford Rifles
- The Winnipeg Light Infantry
- No. 16 Defence Platoon (Lorne Scots)

17th Canadian Infantry Brigade

- The Victoria Rifles of Canada
- 2nd Battalion, The Black Watch (RHR) of Canada
- The Dufferin and Haldimand Rifles of Canada
- No. 17 Defence Platoon (Lorne Scots)

18th Canadian Infantry Brigade

- The Sault Ste. Marie and Sudbury Regiment
- The Rocky Mountain Rangers
- 1st Battalion, Irish Fusiliers of Canada (Vancouver Regiment)
- No. 18 Defence Platoon (Lorne Scots)

Units of the supporting arms included:

- Canadian Armoured Corps:
  - 30th Reconnaissance Battalion (The Essex Regiment)
- Royal Canadian Artillery:
  - Headquarters, Seventh Divisional Artillery, RCA
  - 22nd Field Regiment
    - 3rd Field Battery
    - 6th Field Battery
    - 80th Field Battery
  - 23rd Field Regiment
    - 31st Field Battery
    - 36th Field Battery
    - 83rd Field Battery
  - 24th Field Regiment
    - 49th Field Battery
    - 84th Field Battery
    - 85th Field Battery
  - 10th Light Anti-Aircraft Regiment
    - 6th Light AA Battery
    - 7th Light AA Battery
    - 8th Light AA Battery
    - 9th Light AA Battery
  - 8th Anti-Tank Regiment
    - 10th AT Battery
    - 11th AT Battery
    - 12th AT Battery
    - 13th AT Battery
- Corps of Royal Canadian Engineers:
  - Headquarters 7th Divisional Engineers, RCE
    - 5th Field Park Company, RCE
    - 15th Field Company, RCE
    - 23rd Field Company, RCE
    - 27th Field Company, RCE
- Royal Canadian Corps of Signals:
  - Headquarters 7th Divisional Signals RCCS

Plus units of the RCASC, RCAMC, RCOC, CPC, etc.
