= Pierre Edouard Leclerc =

Major-General Pierre Edouard Leclerc CBE, MM, ED, CD
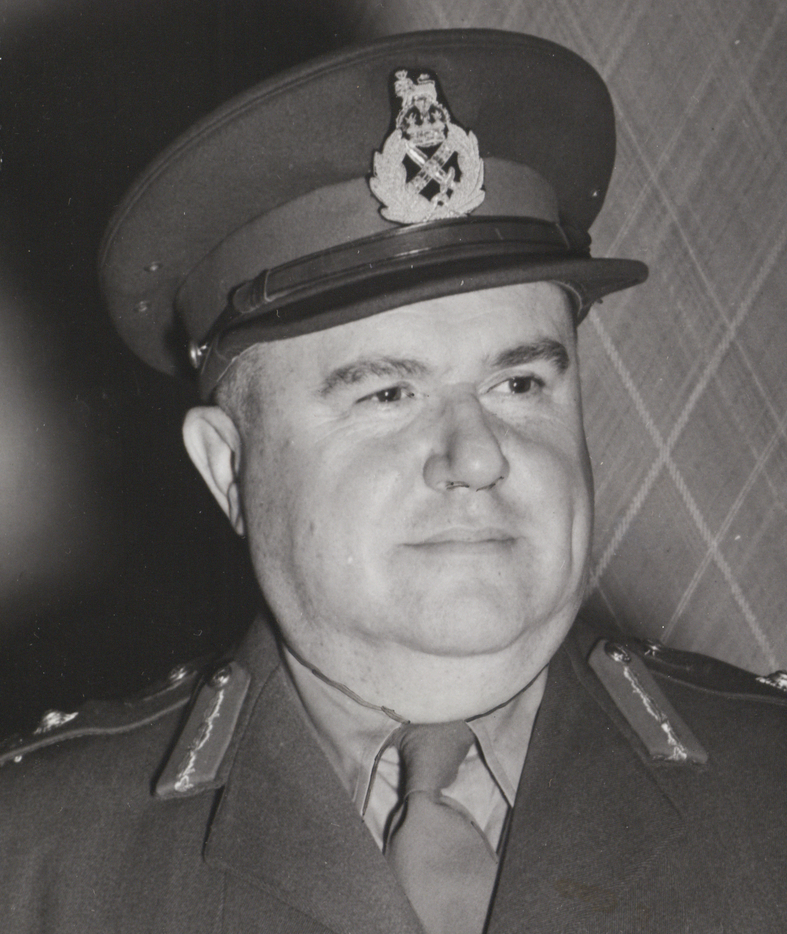
- Born: 1893
- Died: 1982 (aged 88–89)

Major-General Pierre Edouard Leclerc, CBE, MM, ED, CD (1893–1982) was a Canadian Army officer. One of the Army's few senior French-Canadian officers, he commanded the 5th Canadian Infantry Brigade until he was relieved for health reasons in 1941.

He subsequently commanded the 7th Canadian Infantry Division.
