= Régiment de Joliette =

Le Régiment de Joliette
- Active: 1871–1964
- Country: Canada
- Branch: Canadian Militia (1871–1940); Canadian Army (1940–1964)
- Type: Line infantry
- Role: Infantry
- Size: One regiment
- Part of: Non-Permanent Active Militia (1871–1940); Royal Canadian Infantry Corps (1942–1964)
- Garrison/HQ: Joliette, Quebec
- Motto: Quem timebo? (Latin for 'Whom shall I fear?')
- March: "Le Régiment de Joliette"
- Engagements: First World War; Second World War

Le Régiment de Joliette is an inactive infantry regiment of the Canadian Army. It is currently on the Supplementary Order of Battle.

== Lineage ==
=== Le Régiment de Joliette ===
- Originated on 13 January 1871, in Joliette, Quebec, as The Joliette Provisional Battalion of Infantry.
- Redesignated on 27 December 1878 as the 83rd Joliette Battalion of Infantry.
- Redesignated on 8 May 1900 as the 83rd Joliette Regiment.
- Redesignated on 29 March 1920 as Le Régiment de Joliette.
- Redesignated on 3 January 1942 as the 2nd (Reserve) Battalion, Le Régiment de Joliette.
- Redesignated on 1 June 1945 as the Le Régiment de Joliette.
- Reduced to nil strength on 31 December 1964, and transferred to the Supplementary Order of Battle.

== History ==
=== Early history ===
On 13 January 1871, The Joliette Provisional Battalion of Infantry was authorized for service. Its headquarters was at Joliette and had companies at Joliette, S^{t}-Jacques-de-l’Achigan, S^{te}-Mélanie-d’Ailleboust and S^{te}-Elizabeth, Quebec.

On 28 December 1878, the battalion was redesignated as the 83rd Joliette Battalion of Infantry.

On 8 May 1900, the 83rd Joliette Battalion of Infantry was redesignated as the 83rd Joliette Regiment.

=== First World War ===
With the formation of the Canadian Expeditionary Force, the regiment provided volunteers for the 12th Battalion, CEF which sailed to the United Kingdom as part of the First Contingent (later the 1st Canadian Division).

=== 1920s–1930s ===
On 1 April 1920, as a result of the Otter Commission and the following post-war reorganization of the militia, the 83rd Joliette Regiment was redesignated as Le Régiment de Joliette. Unlike most other units of the time though, the regiment was not granted a perpetuation of a CEF battalion or unit.

=== Second World War ===
On 3 January 1942, the regiment mobilized the 1st Battalion, Le Régiment de Joliette, CASF for active service. From January 1943 until February 1944, the battalion served in Newfoundland on garrison duty as part of Atlantic Command. On 10 January 1945, the battalion embarked for Great Britain and after arrival in the UK, on 19 January 1945, the battalion was disbanded to provide reinforcements to the First Canadian Army in the field.

== Organization ==
=== Joliette Provisional Battalion of Infantry (13 January 1871) ===
- No. 1 Company (Joliette, Quebec) (first raised on 18 December 1868 as the Joliette Infantry Company)
- No. 2 Company (St. Jacques de l'Achigan, Quebec) (first raised on 6 February 1869 as the St. Jacques de l'Achigan Infantry Company)
- No. 3 Company (St. Mélanie d'Aillebout, Quebec) (first raised on 6 February 1869 as the St. Mélanie d'Aillebout Infantry Company)
- No. 4 Company (St. Elizabeth, Quebec) (first raised on 9 April 1869 as the St. Elizabeth Infantry Company)

=== 83rd Joliette Regiment (01 December, 1901) ===
- No. 1 Company (Joliette, Quebec)
- No. 2 Company (St. Jacques de l'Achigan, Quebec)
- No. 3 Company (St. Mélanie d'Aillebout, Quebec)
- No. 4 Company (St. Elizabeth, Quebec)
- No. 5 Company (Rawdon, Quebec) (first raised as the 1st Rawdon Infantry Company; moved on 16 September 1872 to Shawinigan, Quebec; moved on 21 May 1875 to Rawdon)
- No. 6 Company (Rawdon, Quebec) (formed on 27 December 1878 by the transfer of No. 5 Company, Three Rivers Provisional Battalion)

=== Le Régiment de Joliette (1 March 1921) ===
- Regimental Headquarters (Joliette, Quebec)
- A Company (Joliette, Quebec)
- B Company (Joliette, Quebec)
- C Company (Shawinigan Falls, Quebec)
- D Company (Lachute, Quebec)

== Alliances ==
- United Kingdom - The Oxfordshire and Buckinghamshire Light Infantry (until 1964)
