= Short food supply chains =

Relatively short distance between food production and consumption

A broad range of food production-distribution-consumption configurations can be characterised as short food supply chains (SFSCs), such as farmers' markets, farm shops, collective farmers' shops, community-supported agriculture and solidarity purchase groups. More generally, a food supply chain can be defined as "short" when it is characterized by short physical distance or involvement of few intermediaries between producers and consumers. Being used interchangeably, alternative food networks fall under the same umbrella as SFSCs. Often guided by principles of sustainability, SFSCs are shaped by recent international policy frameworks. While SFSCs boast strengths, they also encounter challenges in their operations.

== Origin of the concept ==
SFSCs were originally identified as examples of "resistance" of farmers to modernization of the food system, characterized by the development of supply chains based on long-distance trade. Resistance consists in the fact that, by selling directly to consumers, farmers bypass intermediaries and thus can develop autonomous marketing strategies based on differentiation. These strategies give farmers the possibility of keeping a bigger share of the value added within the farm and within the local economies. They have also surfaced as sustainable solutions to tackle the current and future sustainability challenges of the food system, such as promoting food sovereignty, which relates to a citizens' ability to access nutritious, local, and sustainably produced foods for their diets. Given these characteristics, short food supply chains are increasingly taken into consideration by rural food policies as a driver of change in the food system and a policy tool for rural development.

The analysis of short food supply chains has fed a broader debate on "alternative food chains", "alternative food networks", and "sustainable food chains".

=== Specificity ===
SFSCs are considered the most appropriate channels for organic and locally specific products and for small farmers. In fact, a closer relation between producers and consumers gives producers the opportunity to develop a richer communication, and to identify market niches. IIbery and Maye state, "the crucial characteristic of SFSCs is that foods which reach the final consumer have been transmitted through an SC that is 'embedded' with value-laden information concerning the mode of production, provenance, and distinctive quality assets of the product". Likewise, Marsden et al. (2000) state that "a common characteristic, however, is the emphasis upon the type of relationship between the producer and the consumer in these supply chains, and the role of this relationship in constructing value and meaning, rather than solely the type of product itself". SFSCs have the capacity to redefine the production of food items outside the industrialized food system, creating a disruptive process aimed at enabling primary producers to earn a larger share of the profit generated by food production.

=== Dimensions of proximity ===
In order to develop a definition of SFSCs, there are a number of candidate criteria that may be used. SFSCs have been conceptualized in terms of Dimensions of Proximity. Kebir and Torre (2012) were perhaps some of the first to propose such a conceptualization, classifying SFSCs based on several dimensions: Geographical Proximity, "Organized" Proximity and Social Proximity. The three are defined as:

- Geographical proximity: physically close, and is measured as a distance between producers and consumers, meaning the distance between where the food is produced and consumed must be shortened. To elaborate, it is the gap in distance between the place of primary production and the resulting final consumption.
- Organizational proximity: This principle extends to the organizational structure of the food supply chain. It refers to streamlining the number of actors involved, ideally with only one or no intermediaries between the producer and the consumer.
- Social proximity: This involves direct (with very few intermediaries) and trustful relations between a producer and consumer who know each other and the product. Including solidarity between producers and consumers, civic engagement in the local food system and (re)connection with local food traditions and identities. Additionally, knowledge and information is shared by the producer to develop a relationship with the consumer. Social proximity focuses on the relationships created during the development of short chains, including how the consumers feel about the producers.

== Classification ==
SFSCs are classified by Renting et al. as face-to-face, proximate, or extended. Face to face are characterized by physical encounters between producers and consumers (as in the case of farmers' markets). In the proximate short food supply chains, producers do not necessarily engage in product distribution (as in the case of consumers' cooperatives). In the extended short food supply chains, although geographical distances between producers and consumers may be long, consumers are aware of the identity of the producers and of the products (such as in the case of fair trade and protected denominations of origin).

== Community networks ==
Alternative food networks (AFNs) fall within the same category as SFSCs. They offer an alternative to conventional food systems by aiming to localize and socialize food production, distribution, and consumption. AFNs strive to champion local, equitable, and high-quality food options. Alternative Food Networks (AFNs) exhibit diversity, ranging from isolated trials to interconnected community-based entities. Their structures may reflect bottom-up approaches, and how alternative they are depends on the values upheld, the initiative's objectives, and the extent of departure from conventional market norms. The origin of AFNs might have arisen from consumers, producers, or a mix of both, functioning either as single or community ventures, and can range from entirely profit-driven to only socially motivated endeavors. Academic discourse categorizes AFNs according to various criteria, including their temporal and spatial reach, the degree of engagement from producers and consumers, the quantity of intermediaries engaged, the organizational framework and economic models.

== Sustainability ==
SFSCs have arisen as viable solutions to tackle the future concerns of food systems. Managing the economic, social, and environmental impacts contributes to the sustainability of the supply chain. They have the potential to support and strengthen urban-rural food economies, promote local bonds and improve social relationships among stakeholders in the food system. Other benefits have been identified, reporting SFSCs having positive effects on society and favorable economic outcomes as well as a reduction in environmental impacts. These benefits can also be extended to other organizational forms of SFSCs, such as AFNs.

A common characteristic for many SFSCs is their potential to improve producers' incomes. When looking at the local level, SFSCs add to their economic and rural development through increasing local finances. Shortening the food chain encourages social sustainability through trust, solidarity, and shared values between producers and consumers, facilitated by closer proximity among supply chain actors. Shortening the food chain also creates positive social sustainability outcomes, such as consumer empowerment, promotion of healthy diets, and social inclusion. In terms of environmental sustainability, SFSCs can play a role in reducing food miles and greenhouse gas emissions. They often prioritize organic or ecological production methods, minimizing the environmental harm associated with synthetic pesticides, insecticides, monocropping, and more. Additionally, SFSCs have the potential to contribute to reductions in food waste and energy consumption.

== Policy developments ==
=== Sustainable Development Goals (SDGs) ===
The 2030 Agenda for Sustainable Development, established by the United Nations, encompasses 17 Sustainable Development Goals (SDGs) aimed at meeting present needs while protecting the ability of future generations to meet their own needs. Central to these SDGs is the principle of sustainability. Among these goals is the promotion of decent work and economic growth, which involves the creation of sustainable employment opportunities. Another objective is to encourage responsible consumption and production practices, which entail waste reduction and the adoption of renewable energy sources. Additionally, one of the sustainability targets pertains to supply chains and their contribution to climate action by minimizing their carbon footprint. The role of food and its various societal dimensions, is acknowledged as essential for achieving the 17 Sustainable Development Goals (SDGs) established by the international community.

=== New Urban Agenda (NUA) ===
With urban populations experiencing increased growth and nearly 80% of food already being consumed in urban areas, building resilient and economically prosperous food systems integrated across landscapes is essential. The FAO (2019) have created a 3E approach to assist governments to promote better food policies through laws and governance, to encourage investment and data transparency. It uses context-specific actions like supporting local supply chains and social programs to build thriving communities and sustainable food systems. It shares successful strategies with other governments locally and globally to create a ripple effect and establish international standards for food governance.

=== Milan Urban Food Policy Pact (MUFPP) ===
In 2015, the Milan Urban Food Policy Pact (MUFPP), a joint declaration among the largest cities and metropolitan areas, was created to strengthen the implementation of SDGs within urban food systems. This pact urges institutions to recognize the role of food systems in urban planning through six categories of interventions articulated in 37 recommended actions (RAs). These commitments now serve as the basis of food policy agendas for over 200 major urban conglomerations globally, influencing food distribution and consumption patterns among their 400 million inhabitants.

Understanding the connections between Short Food Supply Chains (SFSCs), Sustainable Development Goals (SDGs), the New Urban Agenda (NUA) and the Milan Urban Food Policy Pact (MUFPP) provides policymakers with a science-based framework to use SFSCs as a way to build more sustainable food systems, corresponding with the objectives outlined by the UN Food Systems Summit. The development of such a framework would also facilitate the quantification of the contributions of SFSCs to achieving specific policy goals, so that their objectives can be more precisely implemented.

== Strengths and challenges ==
SFSCs demonstrate adaptability during disruptions and encourage collaboration. Highlighting strong relationships among stakeholders, particularly producers and consumers. Increased collaboration leads to quicker response times and improved performance. Common strategies include risk sharing, collaborative forecasting, communication, joint decision-making, supplier certification and development. Flexibility aids SFSCs in adapting to change by quickly reallocating resources. Strategies to increase flexibility include flexible transportation systems, production facilities, multi-sourcing, and postponement or mass customization. Visibility encourages resilience by enhancing transparency and ensuring timely delivery of relevant information within the supply chain.

SFSCs encounter hurdles like limited resources and expertise, limiting their ability to access funding for sustainable technologies. Additionally, they face challenges in market access, grappling with the high initial costs of self-selling or the competitive disadvantage against larger grocers. These difficulties can result in financial losses in the short and long term. Regulatory frameworks of supply chain governance, along with limited human capital and shrinking access to farmland can affect the viability of SFSCs. Alongside heightened responsibilities, the smaller scale of these producers introduces challenges when starting or increasing SFSC operations. These challenges vary in type based on the producer's characteristics, farm conditions, consumer relationships, and the specific SFSC initiative. Challenges can also include increased real food costs, inefficiencies in resource allocation, transportation issues, and potential food safety risks due to reduced controls.

== Regulations ==
A French action plan developed in 2009 at the Ministry of Agriculture, Agrifood, and Forestry was aimed at supporting the development of short food chains (French: "les circuits courts de commercialisation des produits agricoles"). According to the plan, short food chains are defined on the base of the number of actors involved. SFSC are considered as "commercialization of agricultural products through direct selling or indirect selling when only one intermediary is involved". (French: "Un circuit court est un mode de commercialisation des produits agricoles qui s'exerce soit par la vente directe du producteur au consommateur, soit par la vente indirecte à condition qu'il n'y ait qu'un seul intermédiaire.")

However, there have been discussions at the senate and at regional levels that shortness should not be reduced to the number of intermediaries but also geographical distance should be considered (e.g., one can buy wine directly, but what if it travels 1,000 km?). Following the national action plan (or maybe prior to it in some cases), regional SFSC plans have been developed. Regional action plans refer to the definition above, but they also complement or precise it. F.i. Aquitaine region also adds short or reduced geographical distance between producers and consumers. The French Law on modernization of agriculture and fishing, updated in 2010 (n° 2010-874), among its many other intervention actions also states "the development of short food chains and facilitation of geographical proximity between producers and processors."

The growth of short food supply chains is encouraged as a part of the United States of America's Food Safety Modernization Act. Section 111, "Sanitary Transportation of Food", prompts a study to be conducted in order to examine the effects of longer travel, specifically airborne, on food. The study also would examine and convey the need for rural food sources in order to reduce potential harms due to long delivery periods. The Local and Regional Foods Division, as a part of The United States Department of Agriculture (USDA), conducts research that analyzes agricultural market channels and provides tools and insights to help American farmers and food producers grow. The USDA invests money into local food production in hopes to encourage private investment in local food supply.

== Examples ==
Farmers' markets are physical retail markets featuring foods sold directly by farmers to consumers. There may be controls intended to ensure that sellers and products are local as well as excluding intermediaries: for example, Guildford Borough Council states that producers using their Farmers' Market "must be based in our catchment area of within [a] 50 mile radius of Guildford", although they do also state that "occasionally we will take a producer outside the catchment, but only if it's a product that can't be sourced within the radius".

Community-supported agriculture (CSA), network or association of individuals who have pledged to support one or more local farms, with growers and consumers sharing the risks and benefits of food production. The URGENCI network federates initiatives of CSA from all over the world.

Gruppi di acquisto solidale (GAS) Italian networks initiated by consumers that link up to farmers to organize alternative food provision.

AMAP (French Associations pour le maintien d'une agriculture paysanne) support peasant and organic agriculture through direct links between farmers and consumers

Food hubs aggregate, distribute and market food from farmers to consumers.

Solidarity Purchase Groups (SPG) Bottom-up, community organized group that came together to collectively decide goals, purchasing practices, and priorities. They are often seen as more environmentally friendly, as well as cheaper for the consumer. They are not led by large companies; instead, the organically formed group creates local networks based on trust and shared values for quality.

== Research projects ==
- GLAMUR - Global and local food assessment: a multidimensional performance-based approach
- FOODLINKS - Knowledge brokerage to promote sustainable food consumption and production: linking scientists, policymakers, and civil society organisations
- SUS-CHAINS - Marketing sustainable agriculture: an analysis of the potential role of new food supply chains in sustainable rural development
- PUREFOOD - is a Marie Curie Initial Training Network funded by the European Commission's Seventh Framework PEOPLE program. The objective of PUREFOOD is to train a pool of early-stage researchers in the socio-economic and socio-spatial dynamics of the (peri-)urban and regional foodscape
- SMARTCHAIN - is a Horizon 2020 funded project aiming to further support the development of collaborative short food supply chains and promote a more favourable framework for sustainable, local, healthier and ethically produced food in Europe

== See also ==
- Alternative food systems
