= Sussex Military Camp =

- Camp Sussex
- New Brunswick, Canada

Site information
- Controlled by: Canadian Army

Location
- Location of Sussex Military Camp
- Coordinates: 45.725367°N 65.499782°W

Site history
- Built: 1885
- Built by: Canadian Army
- In use: 1885-1969
- Demolished: Yes

Garrison information
- Garrison: 8th Canadian Hussars (Princess Louise's)

The Sussex Military Camp, frequently shortened to Camp Sussex, was a training facility for the Permanent Active Militia and Non-Permanent Active Militia, later known as the Canadian Army. It was located on the southeastern edge of the town of Sussex, New Brunswick.

Camp Sussex was established in May 1885 when New Brunswick militia units assembled in a large tented camp at the site south of the Intercolonial Railway mainline to prepare for service in the North-West Rebellion. Few permanent buildings were constructed, although a large area of forest and farm land was cleared on the flat floodplain in the Kennebecasis River valley.

During World War I, Camp Sussex hosted the First Training Battalion of the New Brunswick Regiment, later renamed the 1st Depot Battalion in 1918.

The start of World War II saw the 3rd Canadian Infantry Division authorized in 1940 under the command of Major-General E.W. Sansom. The army decided to concentrate the 3 CID in the Maritimes and one of the areas selected was Camp Sussex. The camp was enlarged to handle a brigade with units arriving that fall for training. After the 3 CID units departed for overseas deployment, they were replaced by units from the 4th Canadian (Armoured) Division. Following deployment of the 4 CID, the 17th Infantry Brigade of the 7th Canadian Infantry Division began to use the training facilities; the 7 CID being the general reserve for Atlantic Command. In April 1943 the 17th Infantry Brigade consisted of the Victoria Rifles of Canada, The Dufferin and Haldimand Rifles of Canada and Les Voltigeurs de Québec. The A-34 Special Officer's Training Centre was established at Camp Sussex from 1944–1945 to train officers for the CANLOAN program

Following World War II, the Canadian Army used Camp Sussex as a minor facility for training reserve units in New Brunswick until the construction of Camp Gagetown. The 8th Hussars (Princes Louise's) (Militia) continued to use facilities on the site until the early 70s when Camp Sussex was closed. Until at least 1969, in addition to the Tank Hangar, the Officer's and Sgt's Messes, two H-hut barracks, an H-hut kitchen, a Drill Hall, and a parade square were all in use by the 8 CH. The Regiment also trained on 5 M4A2E8 Sherman tanks until they were removed in the late 60s. The land was purchased from the Department of National Defence by the town of Sussex however few landmarks remain. Part of the town purchase is now repurposed as Princess Louise Park / Sussex Skate Park.

Modern-day Leonard Drive runs through the middle of the training camp and the modern Brigadier Milton Gregg VC Armoury has been constructed on a tiny portion of the former camp to house B Squadron 8th Canadian Hussars (Princess Louise's), a local armoured reserve unit. A nearby rifle range on Fowler Avenue (and Creek Lane) that dates to the days of Camp Sussex remains DND property (fenced off) but is not used for training. The most visible remnant of Camp Sussex is a former tank hangar, now used by the New Brunswick Agricultural Museum and Sussex Armouries.

The governments of Canada and the United Kingdom and the CANLOAN Army Officers Association erected a memorial on 3 June 1961 in Ottawa, Ontario dedicated to the memory of the 128 CANLOAN fatalities within the 673 that served in the British Army during the Second World War.
