= Cobequid Bay =

Inlet in Nova Scotia, Canada

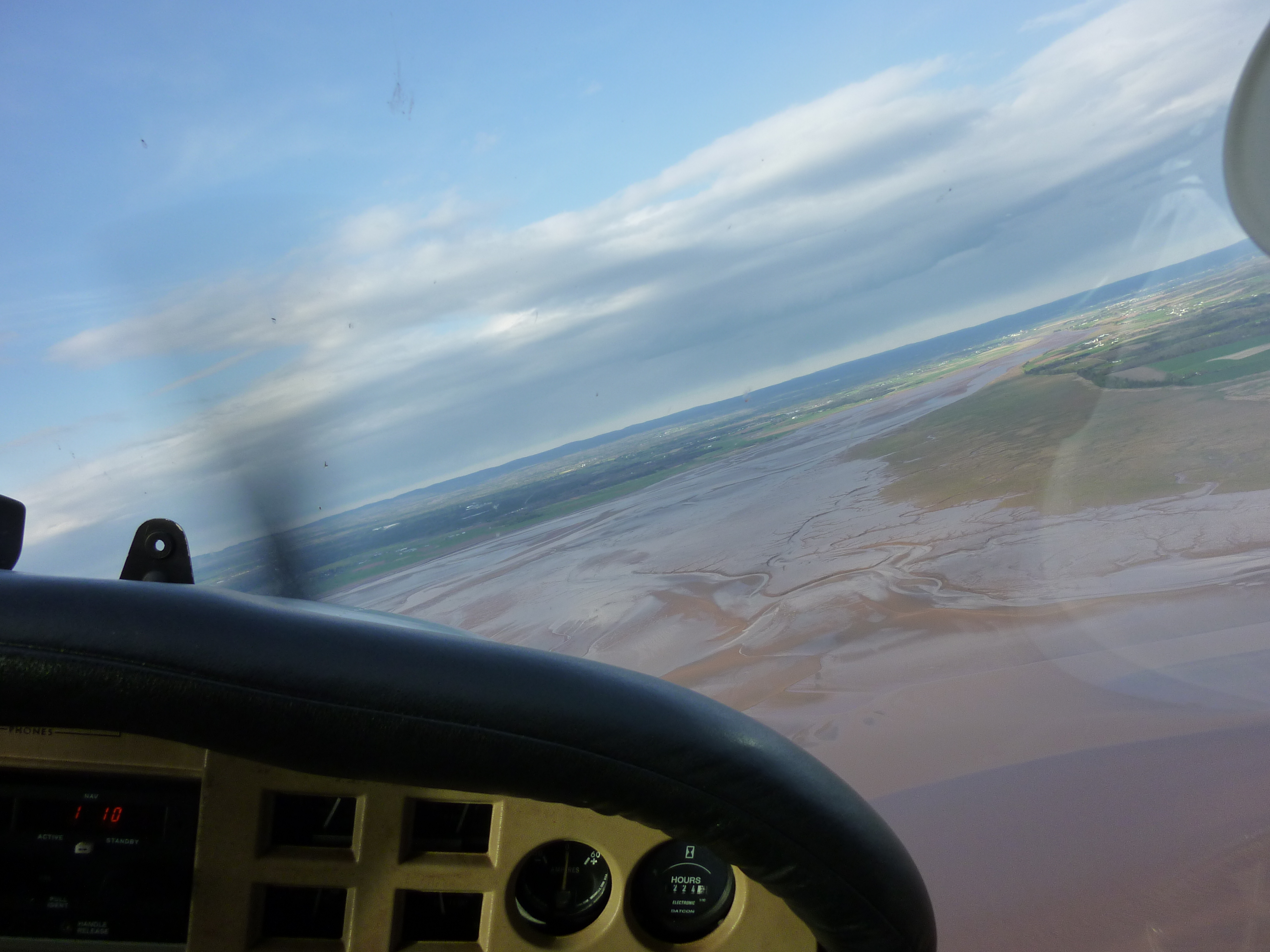
- Aerial photograph of the Cobequid Bay at low tide, looking towards the East.

- Location within Nova Scotia
- Location: Eastern end of Bay of Fundy
- Coordinates: 45°21′N 63°45′W
- River sources: Shubenacadie River Salmon River
- Ocean/sea sources: Atlantic Ocean
- Basin countries: Canada

Cobequid Bay is an inlet of the Bay of Fundy and the easternmost part of the Minas Basin, located in the Canadian province of Nova Scotia. The bay was carved by rivers flowing into the eastern end of the Bay of Fundy.

The eastern end of the bay hosts the estuary of the Salmon River, whereas the west end of the bay is less well-defined, typically delineated by Burntcoat Head on the southern shore and Five Islands or Economy Mountain on the northern shore.

The largest tidal range in the world was measured at Burntcoat Head, where average tidal ranges measure a 12.4 m (41 ft) vertical difference in water level between low tide and high tide.

The bay's name is derived from the Acadian spelling of We'kopekwitk, the Mi'kmaq name for the area. Acadian settlers came to this area in the early 1700s.

The bay is an Important Bird Area. as well as having tourist spots such as Debert Beach and Masstown Market.
