= Atlantic Command (Canadian Army) =

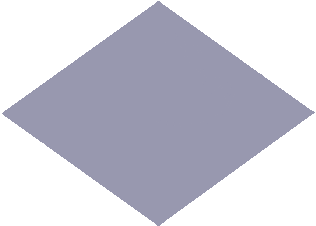
- Formation patch.
- Active: During the Second World War 1942-1945
- Country: Canada
- Branch: Canadian Army

Commanders
- Notable commanders: Maj.-Gen. W. H. P. Elkins

Atlantic Command was a formation of the Canadian Army created during the Second World War to strengthen and administer home defence facilities on Canada's Atlantic Coast. A second major function was to train reinforcements to be sent to the Canadian divisions in Europe. Most of those soldiers received and trained with their personal weapons in Camp Debert before being transported by train to Halifax where they embarked on troop ships that took them to Britain.

Atlantic Command combined the pre-war Military District No. 6 (Prince Edward Island and Nova Scotia) with Military District No. 7 (New Brunswick) and Military District No. 5 (the eastern part of the Province of Quebec bordering the Gulf of Saint Lawrence). Extending the existing military cooperation among Canada, the Dominion of Newfoundland and the United Kingdom, Atlantic Command also controlled Canadian personnel stationed in Newfoundland.

== Composition ==
- Halifax Fortress
  - 1st (Halifax) Coast Regiment, Royal Canadian Artillery (RCA)
  - 21st Anti-Aircraft Regiment, RCA
  - Lanark and Renfrew Scottish Regiment
  - 2nd Battalion, Black Watch (R.H.R.) of Canada (attached from 7th Cdn Inf Div)
- Saint John Defences
  - 3rd (New Brunswick) Coast Regiment, RCA
  - 22nd Anti-Aircraft Regiment, RCA
  - Le Régiment de Chateauguay (Militia)
  - Prince Edward Island Highlanders
- Sydney and Canso Defences
  - 16th Coast Regiment, RCA
  - 23rd Anti-Aircraft Regiment, RCA
  - Les Fusiliers du St. Laurent (less two companies)
  - 2nd/10th Dragoons C.I.C (attached from 7th Cdn Inf Div)
- Shelburne Defences
  - 104th Coast Battery, RCA
  - One company of Les Fusiliers du St. Laurent
- Gaspé Defences
  - 105th Coast Battery, RCA
  - One company of Les Fusiliers du St. Laurent
- Goose Bay Defences
  - 108th Coast Battery, RCA
  - New Brunswick Rangers
- Newfoundland (based in St. John's)
  - 25th Anti-Aircraft Regiment, RCA
  - 26th Anti-Aircraft Regiment, RCA
  - 103rd Coast Battery, RCA
  - 106th Coast Battery, RCA
  - Le Régiment de Joliette
  - Pictou Highlanders
  - Lincoln and Welland Regiment (until May 1943)
  - Le Régiment de St. Hyacinthe (from May 1943)
- 7th Canadian Infantry Division, Mar. 1942 - Oct. 1943
  - Divisional troops based at Camp Debert, Nova Scotia
  - 15th Infantry Brigade (based at Camp Debert)
  - 17th Infantry Brigade (based at Camp Sussex, New Brunswick)
  - 20th Infantry Brigade (based at Camp Debert)

== Commanders ==
The following two generals served as General Officer Commanding in Chief Atlantic Command:

- Major-General William Henry Pferinger Elkins, Aug. 1, 1940 to July 15, 1943
- Major-General L. F. Page, July 16, 1943, to Aug. 26, 1944

== See also ==
- Pacific Command (Canadian Army), corresponding command on the Pacific Coast
- 5th Canadian Division, the present-day formation in the Canadian Forces
- Canadian Northwest Atlantic Command, Allied naval command responsible for guarding the North Atlantic shipping lanes during the Battle of the Atlantic
