= Masstown =

Community in Nova Scotia, Canada

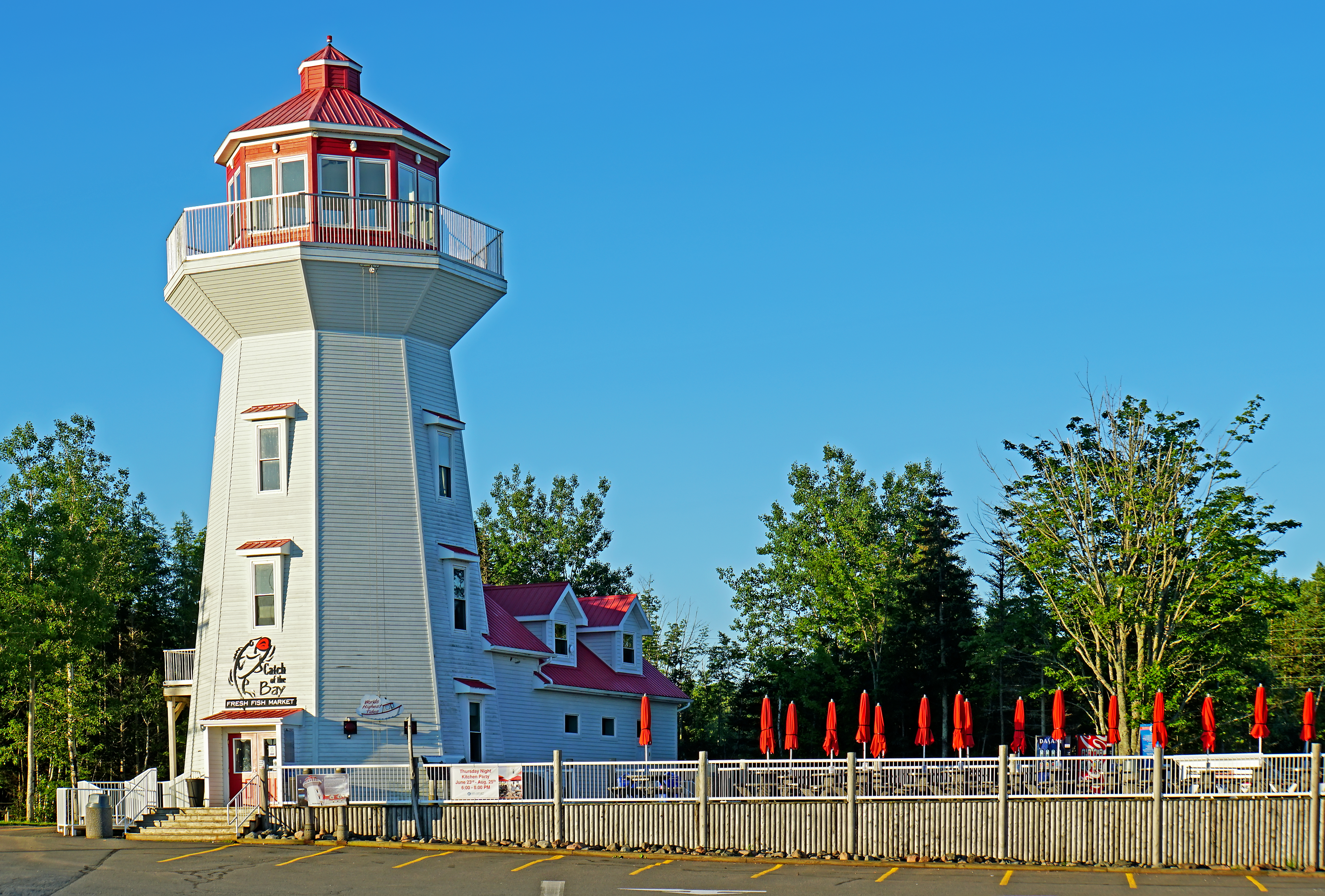
- Fish market in Masstown

- Location within Nova Scotia
- Coordinates: 45°23′17″N 63°28′56″W
- Country: Canada
- Province: Nova Scotia
- Municipality: Colchester
- Time zone: UTC-4 (AST)
  - Summer (DST): UTC-3 (ADT)
- Postal code: B0M 1G0
- Area code: 902
- GNBC Code: CAXVQ

Masstown (formerly Cobequid) is an unincorporated community in the Canadian province of Nova Scotia, located approximately 17 kilometres (11 mi) from Truro.

== History ==
Masstown has its beginnings with French settlers, known as Acadians. They first settled in this area near the Cobequid Bay in 1705 (321 years ago). The Acadian culture consisted primarily of farming; remains of marshland dykes, that cover the entire coast of the community, indicate their advanced farming systems. Once an old Acadian settlement, Masstown was the site of the first Acadian church in Nova Scotia, and a cairn is erected at the nearby United Church to commemorate this former landmark. The subsequent Catholic Church inspired the community's name: "Mass" town.

== Present-day community ==
Masstown is located 15 minutes west of Truro on Nova Scotia Trunk 2 or Exit 12 off Nova Scotia Highway 104. The small farming community has a local market and now a Tim Hortons and Greco. The local market, the Masstown Market is a tourist attraction for the community as well as the fish market and restaurants and diners nearby. Masstown Market is a popular halfway stop for people travelling between Moncton and Halifax.

== Demographics ==
In the 2021 Canadian census conducted by Statistics Canada, Masstown had a population of 156 living in 62 of its 65 total private dwellings, a change of −4.9% from its 2016 population of 164. With a land area of 0.76 km^{2} (0.29 sq mi), it had a population density of 205.3/km^{2} (531.6/sq mi) in 2021.
