= Potato movement =

Socio-agri movement

The Potato Movement (Greek: Κίνημα της Πατάτας) is a grassroots socio-agriculture movement in Greece. The movement consists of Greek farmers setting up co-ops and selling potatoes directly to the Greek public in response to cheap potato imports from Egypt and other countries.
