= Thane (disambiguation) =

Thane is a city in Maharashtra, India.

Thane may also refer to:

== Titles ==
- Thegn, or thane, a retainer or official of a king or nobleman in medieval England and Scandinavia, or a class of aristocracy
- Thane (Scotland), a title given to a local royal official in medieval eastern Scotland
  - Thane of Cawdor, a title in the Peerage of Scotland and a character in Macbeth

== Places ==
- Thane, city in Maharashtra, India
  - Thane district
  - Thane taluka
  - Thane railway station
  - Thane Lok Sabha constituency
  - Thane Assembly constituency
- Thane, Queensland, Australia
- Thane, Juneau, Alaska, United States
- Qafë Thanë, Albania and Macedonia

== Other uses ==
- Thane (comics), a Marvel Comics character
- Thane (name), including lists of people with the given name or surname
- Cyclone Thane, in the North Indian Ocean in 2011
- Thane Krios, a character in the Mass Effect video game series
- HMS Thane (D48), a Royal Navy escort carrier

== See also ==
- Thana (disambiguation)
- Thanatos (disambiguation)
- Thain, a surname
- Thein, a name
- Thane Direct, a British home shopping TV channel
