= Thain =

Thain is a name.

== Surname ==
Notable people with the surname include:

- Caryl Thain (1895–1969), English cricketer
- Colin Thain (born 1959), political scientist
- Gary Thain (1948–1975), musician
- Gillian Stroudley (née Thain, 1925–1992), English painter and printmaker.
- James Thain (1921–1975), British aviator, pilot in the 1958 Munich air disaster
- John Thain (born 1955), businessman
- John Thain (footballer) (1903–1977), English professional footballer
- Kevin Thain (born 1969), shinty player
- Thomas Thain (died 1832), politician

== Given name ==
Notable people with the given name include:

- Thain Simon (1922–2007), ice hockey player
- Thain Wendell MacDowell (1890–1960), recipient of the Victoria Cross

== See also ==
- Thain (Middle-earth), fictional title
- Thane (disambiguation)
- Thein
- Thegn
