= Tanha Kola =

Tanha Kola (Persian: تنهاكلا) may refer to:

- Tanha Kola, Amol
- Tanha Kola, Babol
