= William Johnstone Milne =

Canadian soldier and recipient of the Victoria Cross

William Johnstone Milne VC
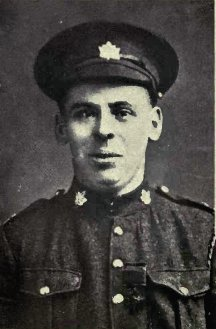
- Born: 21 December 1892; Cambusnethan, Wishaw, Scotland
- Died: 9 April 1917 (aged 24) near Thelus, Vimy Ridge, France
- Military career
- Allegiance: Canada
- Branch: Canadian Expeditionary Force
- Service years: 1915–1917
- Rank: Private
- Units: 16th Battalion, CEF
- Conflicts: First World War: Western Front; Nivelle Offensive; Battle of Arras; Battle of Vimy Ridge †
- Awards: Victoria Cross

William Johnstone Milne VC (21 December 1892 – 9 April 1917) was a First World War Canadian soldier. Milne was a posthumous recipient of the Victoria Cross, the highest and most prestigious award for gallantry in the face of the enemy that can be awarded to British and Commonwealth forces. He received the VC for his actions at the Battle of Vimy Ridge on 9 April 1917.

== Details ==
Milne was born on 21 December 1892 in Scotland and moved to Canada in 1910. He worked on a farm near Moose Jaw, Saskatchewan before joining the army in September 1915.

Milne was 24 years old and a private in the 16th (The Canadian Scottish) Battalion, Canadian Expeditionary Force on 9 April 1917 near Thelus, France, during the Battle of Vimy Ridge, where his actions led to the award of the Victoria Cross.

His citation reads:

For most conspicuous bravery and devotion to duty in attack. On approaching the first objective, Pte. Milne observed an enemy machine gun firing on our advancing troops. Crawling on hands and knees, he succeeded in reaching the gun, killing the crew with bombs, and capturing the gun. On the line re-forming, he again located a machine gun in the support line, and stalking this second gun as he had done the first, he succeeded in putting the crew out of action and capturing the gun. His wonderful bravery and resource on these two occasions undoubtedly saved the lives of many of his comrades. Pte. Milne was killed shortly after capturing the second gun.

Four soldiers earned the Victoria Cross in the Battle of Vimy Ridge; the others were Thain Wendell MacDowell, Ellis Wellwood Sifton and John George Pattison.

Milne's body was never found. He is commemorated on the Vimy Memorial.

== The medal ==
Milne's Victoria Cross is in the collection of the Canadian War Museum in Ottawa.

== Bibliography ==
- Gliddon, Gerald (2012) [1998]. Arras and Messines 1917. VCs of the First World War. The History Press. ISBN 978-0-7524-6604-0.
