= Ellis Wellwood Sifton =

Canadian soldier

Ellis Wellwood Sifton VC
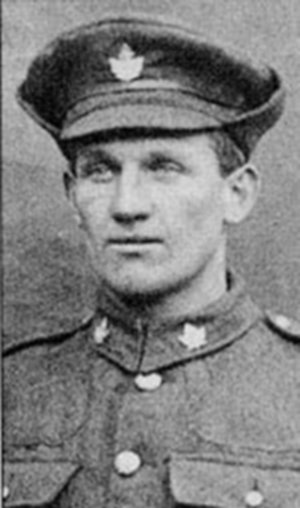
- Born: 12 October 1891; Wallacetown, Ontario, Canada
- Died: 9 April 1917 (aged 25); Neuville-Saint-Vaast, Vimy Ridge, France
- Burial place: Lichfield Crater Cemetery, Thélus
- Military career
- Allegiance: Canada
- Service years: 1914–1917
- Rank: Lance-Sergeant
- Units: 18th Battalion (Western Ontario), CEF
- Conflicts: World War I: Western Front; Nivelle Offensive; Battle of Arras; Battle of Vimy Ridge †
- Awards: Victoria Cross

Ellis Wellwood Sifton VC (12 October 1891 – 9 April 1917) was a Canadian soldier. Sifton was a recipient of the Victoria Cross, the highest and most prestigious award for gallantry in the face of the enemy that can be awarded to British and Commonwealth forces.

Sifton was born in Wallacetown, Ontario and was a farmer when he enlisted in October 1914.

== Victoria Cross ==
One of four soldiers to earn the Victoria Cross in the Battle of Vimy Ridge (the others were Thain Wendell MacDowell, William Johnstone Milne and John George Pattison), Sifton was 25 years old, and a Lance Sergeant in the 18th (Western Ontario) Battalion, Canadian Expeditionary Force during the First World War when the following deed took place for which he was awarded the Victoria Cross.

On 9 April 1917 at Neuville-St.-Vaast, France, during an attack on enemy trenches, Lance-Sergeant Sifton's company was held up by machine-gun fire. During an attack on Vimy Ridge, "C" Company of the 18th Battalion was held up during its advance by German machine gunners who had survived the artillery barrage by taking refuge in concrete shelters. As the Canadians moved forward, the German machine guns swept the battlefield, causing heavy casualties. Sifton saw the machine gun nest first. He jumped up, rushed forward and leapt into the trench. He then charged into the German gun crew and knocked the gun over before turning on the gunners with his bayonet, killing each man. More Canadians hurried forward, but not before a small German party moved down the trench towards Sifton. He used his bayonet and his rifle as a club to fight them off until help arrived. Despite these efforts, Sifton was killed during the fighting.

=== Citation ===
His Victoria Cross citation published in The London Gazette, dated 8 June 1917 reads:

For most conspicuous bravery and devotion to duty.

During the attack in enemy trenches Sjt. Sifton's company was held up by machine gun fire which inflicted many casualties. Having located the gun he charged it single-handed, killing all the crew.

A small enemy party advanced down the trench, but he succeeded keeping these off till our men had gained the position.

In carrying out this gallant act he was killed, but his conspicuous valour undoubtedly saved many lives and contributed largely to the success of the operation.

His VC is held by the Elgin County Pioneer Museum in St Thomas, Ontario.

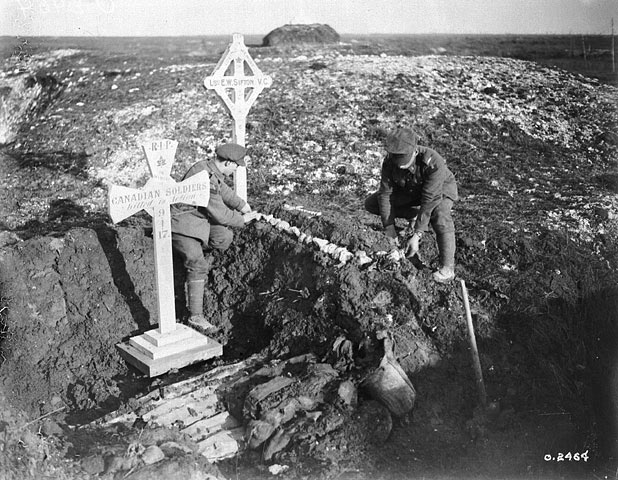
Two soldiers tending to the grave of Lance-Sergeant E. W. Sifton, February 1918
