= Tanah =

Tanah is the Malay/Indonesian word for soil, land or island.

It can be found in topography.

- Tanah Abang – a market district in Jakarta, Indonesia
- Tanah Datar – a regency in West Sumatra, Indonesia
- Tanah Lot – a temple in Bali, Indonesia
- Tanah Merah (disambiguation)

== See also ==
- Thana (disambiguation)
- Tanha (disambiguation)
