= Thana (disambiguation) =

Thana means "police station" in South Asian countries and is an administrative unit.

Thana may also refer to:

- Thana, Malakand, Pakistan
- Thana, Kannur, India
- Thane, known as Thana until 1996, Maharashtra, India
  - Thane district
- Thana Bhawan, also known simply as Thana, town in Uttar Pradesh, India

== See also ==
- Thane (disambiguation)
- Tanah (disambiguation)
- Thaana, the writing system of the Maldivian language
