= Thein =

Thein is a name found in several cultures. Notable people with this name include:

== Burmese name ==
- Aung Min Thein (1961–2007), film director and artist
- Thein Han (basketball) (born 1998), basketball player
- Hla Thein (born 1944), athlete
- Hmawbi Saya Thein (1862–1942), writer, known for his articles on Burmese culture and history.
- Khin Maung Thein (born 1940), politician and political prisoner who currently serves as a Pyithu Hluttaw MP for Sagaing Township
- Kyaw Thein (born 1954), politician who currently serves as an Amyotha Hluttaw MP for Rakhine State No. 7 Constituency
- Nilar Thein (born 1972), democracy activist and political prisoner
- Phyo Min Thein (born 1969), politician and former inmate who is currently serving as Chief Minister of Yangon Region and Yangon Region Parliament MP for Hlegu Township Constituency No. 2
- Soe Thein (born 1949), incumbent Minister of the President's Office of Myanmar (Burma) and a former Minister for Industry-2
- Swee Lay Thein, Malaysian scientist
- Thein Aung, politician, Chief Minister of Ayeyarwady Region, Myanmar from 2011 to 2016
- Thein Han (painter) (1910–1986), painter
- Thein Htaik (born 1952), politician, Union Auditor General of Myanmar, appointed to the post on 7 September 2012
- Thein Thein Htay, former deputy minister of health
- Thein Htay (born 1955), politician, former Minister for Border Affairs and Minister for Industrial Development of Myanmar (Burma)
- Thein Kyu (born 1944), dental professor
- Thein Lwin (born 1957), politician who currently serves as a House of Nationalities member of parliament for Kachin State No. 10 Constituency
- Thein Myint (born 1937), boxer
- Thein Naing, a Myanmar-Chinese robbed and murdered in Singapore in 2005
- Thein Nyunt (born 1948), politician, currently one of six ministers of the President's Office, in the Cabinet of Burma (Myanmar), as well as the Mayor and the Chairman of the Naypyidaw Council
- Thein Oo (born 1948), a pioneer of Myanmar's computer industry
- Thein Pe Myint (1914–1978), politician, writer and journalist
- Thein Than Win (born 1991), footballer
- Thein Tun (born 1940), retired Major-general and politician, serving as the Minister for Posts and Telecommunications of Myanmar
- Thein Tun (businessman) (1937–2022), businessman and founder of Myanmar Golden Star
- Thein Tun Oo (born 1966), politician who served as member of parliament in the Pyithu Hluttaw for Amarapura Township from 2011 to 2016
- Thein Tut (born 1955), professor of dental medicine
- Win Thein, engineer, is the chief minister of Bago Region, appointed by president Htin Kyaw in 2016
- Yaza Win Thein (born 1986), footballer

== German-language name ==
- Alexandra Thein (born 1963), German politician
- Joe Thein (born 1991), Luxembourgish politician
- Mechthildis Thein (1888–1959), German stage and film actress of the silent period
- Ulrich Thein (1930–1995), German actor, film director and screenwriter

== Tamil-language name ==
- Thein Manimekalai Sowrirajan (born 1992), Academic, Architect and Entrepreneur
