= Rydsgård Runestone =

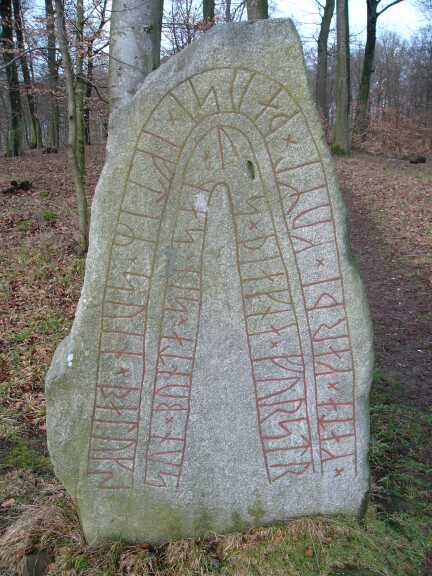
- Created: c. 900-1000 AD
- Discovered: Rydsgård manor (Skurup), Skåne, Sweden
- Rundata ID: DR 277
- Runemaster: Unknown

Text – Native
- Old Norse:See article

Translation
- See article

The Rydsgård Runestone, designated as DR 277 under Rundata, is located in the woods just outside the park at Rydsgård manor, which is near Skurup, Skåne, Sweden.

== Description ==
The Rydsgård Runestone is classified as being carved in runestone style RAK. Similar to the Velanda Runestone, the inscription describes the deceased as being a good þegn, or thegn. The exact role of thegns in southern Sweden is a matter of debate, but the most common view is that these persons constituted a Nordic elite somehow connected to Danish power. It is thought that thegn-stones point to areas where they came from. From such power centres they could be sent forth to rule border areas in so-called tegnebyar.

== Inscription ==
=== Transliteration into Latin characters ===
× kata × karþi × kuml × þausi × iftiʀ × suin × baluks ¶ sun × bunta × sin × saʀ × uas × þiakna × furstr

=== Transcription into Old Norse ===
Káta gerði kuml þessi eptir Svein Bôllungs son, bónda sinn. Sá var þegna fyrstr.

=== Translation in English ===
Káta made this monument in memory of Sveinn Bôllungr's son, her husbandman. He was first among þegns.
