= Battle of Vimy Ridge =

World War I battle (April 1917)

- Part of the Battle of Arras on the Western Front
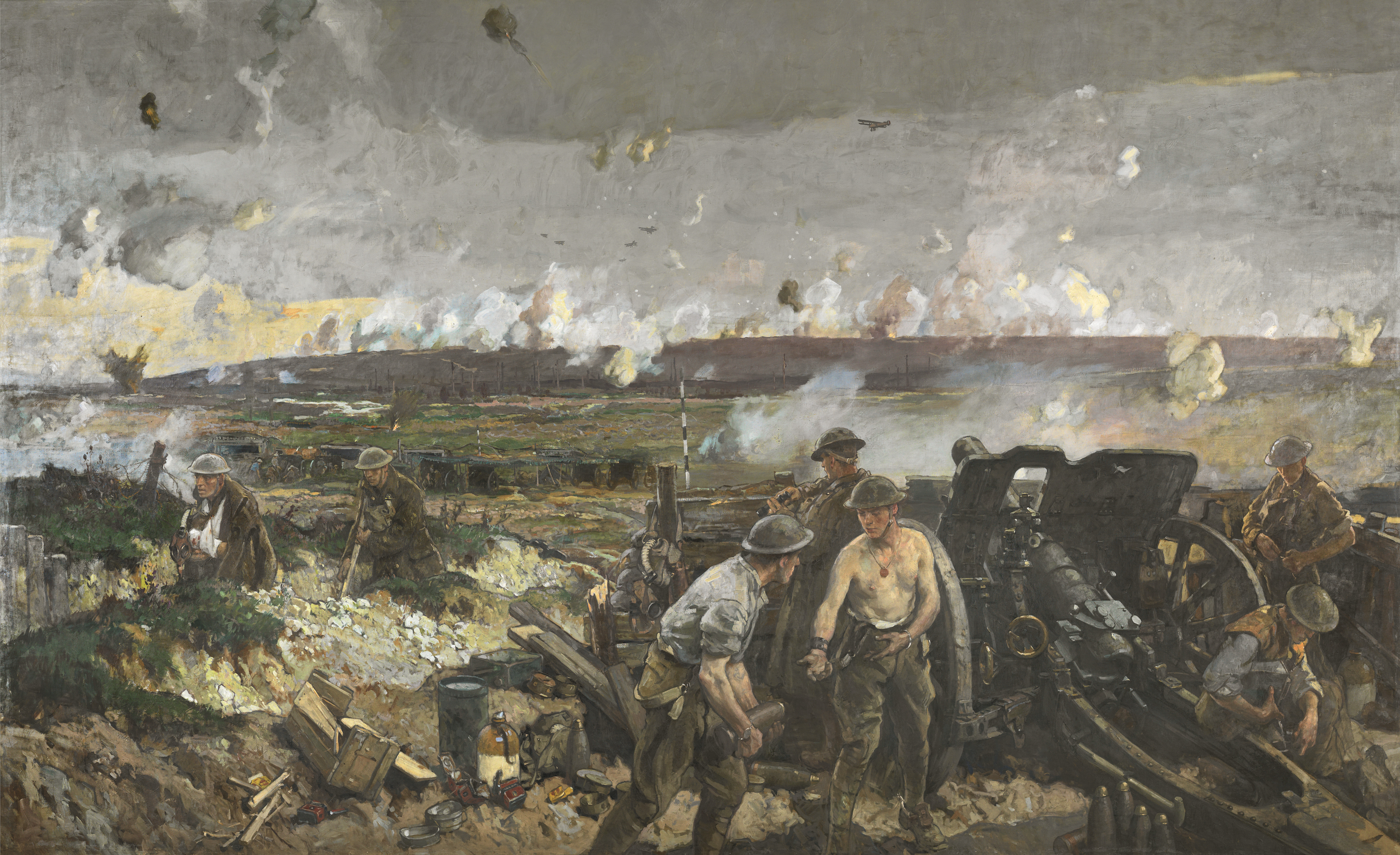
Date	9–12 April 1917
Location	Vimy, Pas-de-Calais, France 50°22′46″N 02°46′26″E
Result	British Empire victory

Belligerents
Canada; United Kingdom	German Empire

Commanders and leaders
Julian Byng	Ludwig von Falkenhausen

Strength
4 Canadian divisions; 1 British division	3 divisions

Casualties and losses
3,598 dead; 7,004 wounded	4,000 captured

The Battle of Vimy Ridge (9–12 April 1917) was part of the Battle of Arras, in the Pas-de-Calais department of France, during the First World War. The main combatants were the four divisions of the Canadian Corps in the First Army, against three divisions of the German 6th Army. The battle began the Battle of Arras and was the first attack of the Nivelle Offensive. The objective was to draw German reserves away from the French forces, preparing for the French offensive along the Aisne and the Chemin des Dames ridge several days later.

The Canadian Corps was to capture Vimy Ridge, an escarpment on the northern flank of the Arras front. This would protect the First Army and the Third Army farther south from German enfilade fire. Supported by a creeping barrage, the Canadian Corps captured most of the ridge during the first day. The village of Thélus fell on the second day, as did the crest of the ridge, once the Canadian Corps overran a salient against considerable German resistance. The final objective, a fortified knoll outside the village of Givenchy-en-Gohelle, fell to the Canadians on 12 April. The 6th Army retreated to the Oppy–Méricourt line.

Historians attribute the success of the Canadian Corps to technical and tactical innovation, meticulous planning, powerful artillery support and extensive training and the inability of the 6th Army properly to apply the new German defensive doctrine. The battle was the first occasion when the four divisions of the Canadian Expeditionary Force fought together and it was made a symbol of Canadian national achievement and sacrifice. A 100 ha (250-acre) portion of the battleground serves as a memorial park and site of the Canadian National Vimy Memorial.

== Background ==
=== Vimy Ridge 1914–1916 ===
Vimy Ridge is an escarpment 8 km (5.0 mi) northeast of Arras on the western edge of the Douai Plain. The ridge rises gradually on its western side and drops more quickly on the eastern side. At approximately 7 km (4.3 mi) in length and culminating at an elevation of 145 m (476 ft) or 60 m (200 ft) above the Douai Plains, the ridge provides a natural unobstructed view for tens of kilometres in all directions. The ridge fell under German control in October 1914 during the Race to the Sea as the Franco-British and German forces attempted to outflank each other through north-eastern France.

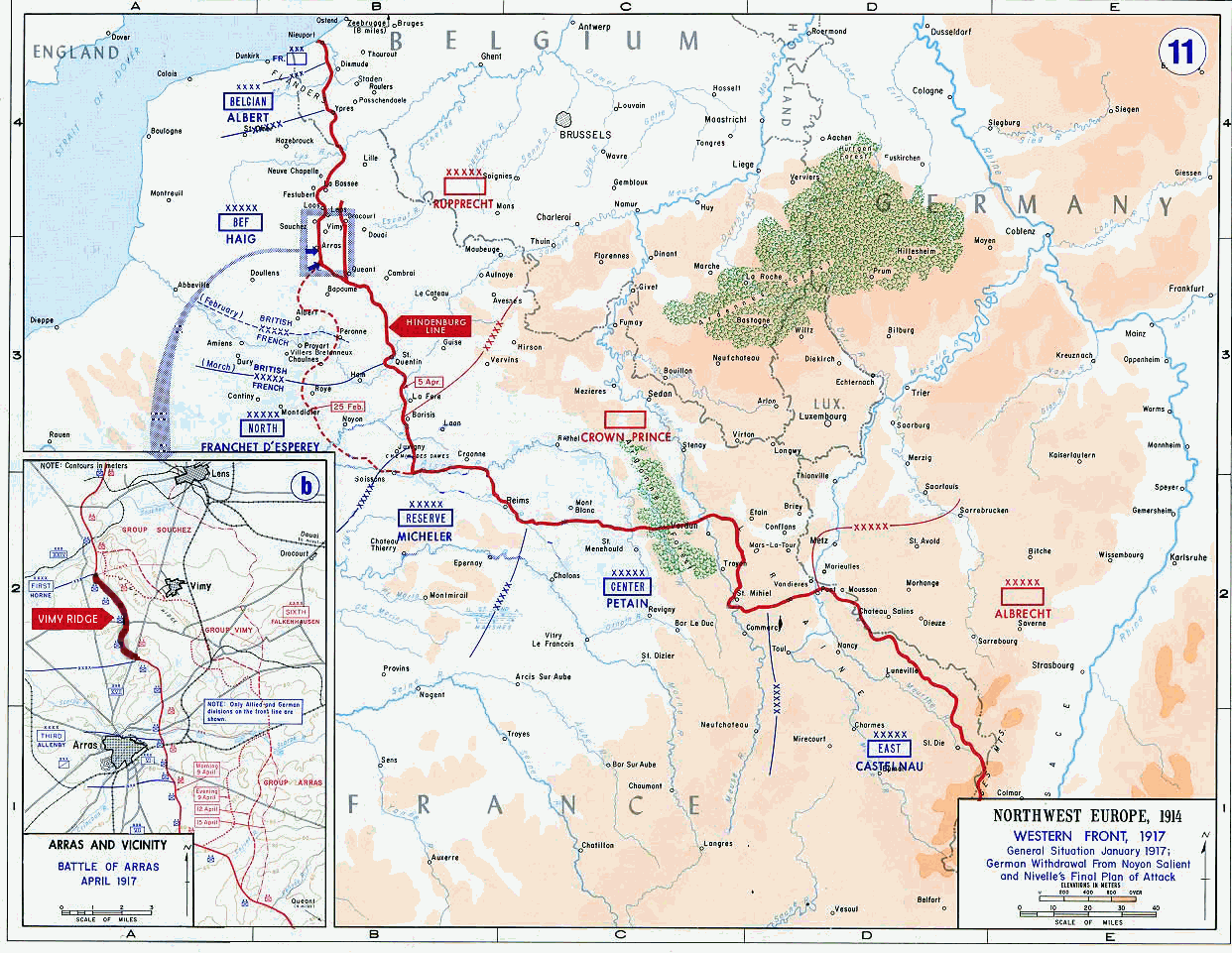
The location of the Battle of Vimy Ridge

The French Tenth Army tried to eject the Germans during the Second Battle of Artois in May 1915 by attacking at Vimy Ridge and Notre Dame de Lorette. The French 1st Moroccan Division managed to briefly capture the height of the ridge but was unable to hold it owing to a lack of reinforcements. The French tried again at the Third Battle of Artois in September 1915 but only captured the village of Souchez at the western base of the ridge. The Vimy sector calmed following the offensive with both sides taking a largely live and let live approach. The French suffered approximately 150,000 casualties in their attempts to gain control of the Vimy Ridge area.

=== 1916–1917 ===
The French Tenth Army was relieved in February 1916 by XVII Corps (Lieutenant-General Sir Julian Byng) and transferred to join in the Battle of Verdun. The British soon discovered that German tunnelling companies had taken advantage of the relative calm on the surface to build an extensive network of tunnels and deep mines from which they would attack French positions by setting off explosive charges underneath their trenches. The Royal Engineers sent specialist tunnelling companies to the ridge to combat the German mining operations and German artillery and trench mortar fire intensified in early May 1916. On 21 May 1916, after shelling the British forward trenches and divisional artillery positions from eighty hidden batteries on the reverse slope of the ridge, the German infantry began Unternehmen Schleswig Holstein, an attack on the British lines along a 2,000 yd (1,800 m) front, to eject them from positions along the ridge. The Germans captured several British-controlled tunnels and mine craters before halting their advance and digging in. (Note: The Germans had grown uneasy about the proximity of the British positions to the top of the ridge, particularly after the increase in British tunnelling and counter-mining.) Small counter-attacks by battalions of the 140th and 141st Brigades took place on 22 May but were foiled. The Canadian Corps relieved IV Corps along the western slopes of Vimy Ridge in October 1916.

== Prelude ==
=== Strategy ===
External videos
- Vimy Ridge; A Canadian Heritage Minute that follows Major-General Arthur Currie discusses the plan of attack on Vimy Ridge with General Julian Byng – Historica Canada (1:01 min)

On 28 May 1916, Byng took command of the Canadian Corps from Lieutenant-General Sir Edwin Alderson. Discussions for a spring offensive near Arras began, following a formal conference of corps commanders held at the First Army Headquarters (HQ) on 21 November 1916. In March 1917, the army HQ formally presented Byng with orders giving Vimy Ridge as the Canadian Corps objective for the Arras Offensive.

A plan, adopted in early March 1917, drew on the briefings of staff officers sent to learn from the experiences of the French Army during the Battle of Verdun. For the first time the four Canadian divisions would fight together. The nature and size of the attack needed more resources than the Canadian Corps possessed and the British 5th Division, artillery, engineer and labour units were attached to the corps, bringing the nominal strength of the Canadian Corps to about 170,000 men, of whom 97,184 were Canadian.

=== Tactics ===
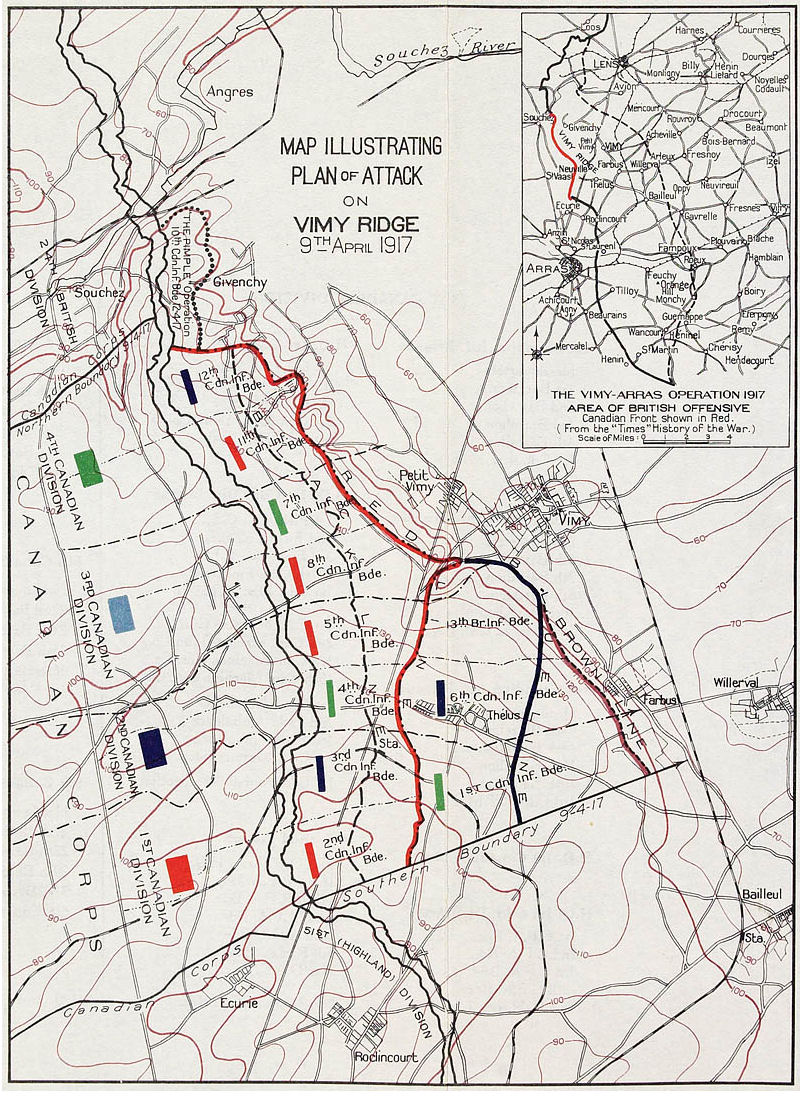
The Canadian Corps plan of attack outlining the four coloured objective lines – Black, Red, Blue and Brown

In January 1917, three Canadian Corps officers accompanied other British and Dominion officers attending lectures by the French Army on their experiences during the Battle of Verdun. The French counter-offensive devised by General Robert Nivelle had been one of a number of Allied successes of 1916. Following extensive rehearsal, eight French divisions had assaulted German positions in two waves along a 6 mi (10 km) front. Supported by extremely powerful artillery, the French had recovered lost ground and inflicted severe casualties on five German divisions.

On their return from the lectures, the Canadian Corps staff officers produced a tactical analysis of the Verdun battles and delivered corps and divisional-level lectures to promote the primacy of artillery and stress the importance of harassing fire and company and platoon flexibility. The report of the 1st Canadian Division commander, Arthur Currie, highlighted the lessons he believed the Canadian Corps could learn from the experiences of the French. The final plan for the assault on Vimy Ridge drew on the experience and tactical analysis of the officers who attended the Verdun lectures. The First Army commander, General Henry Horne approved the plan on 5 March 1917.

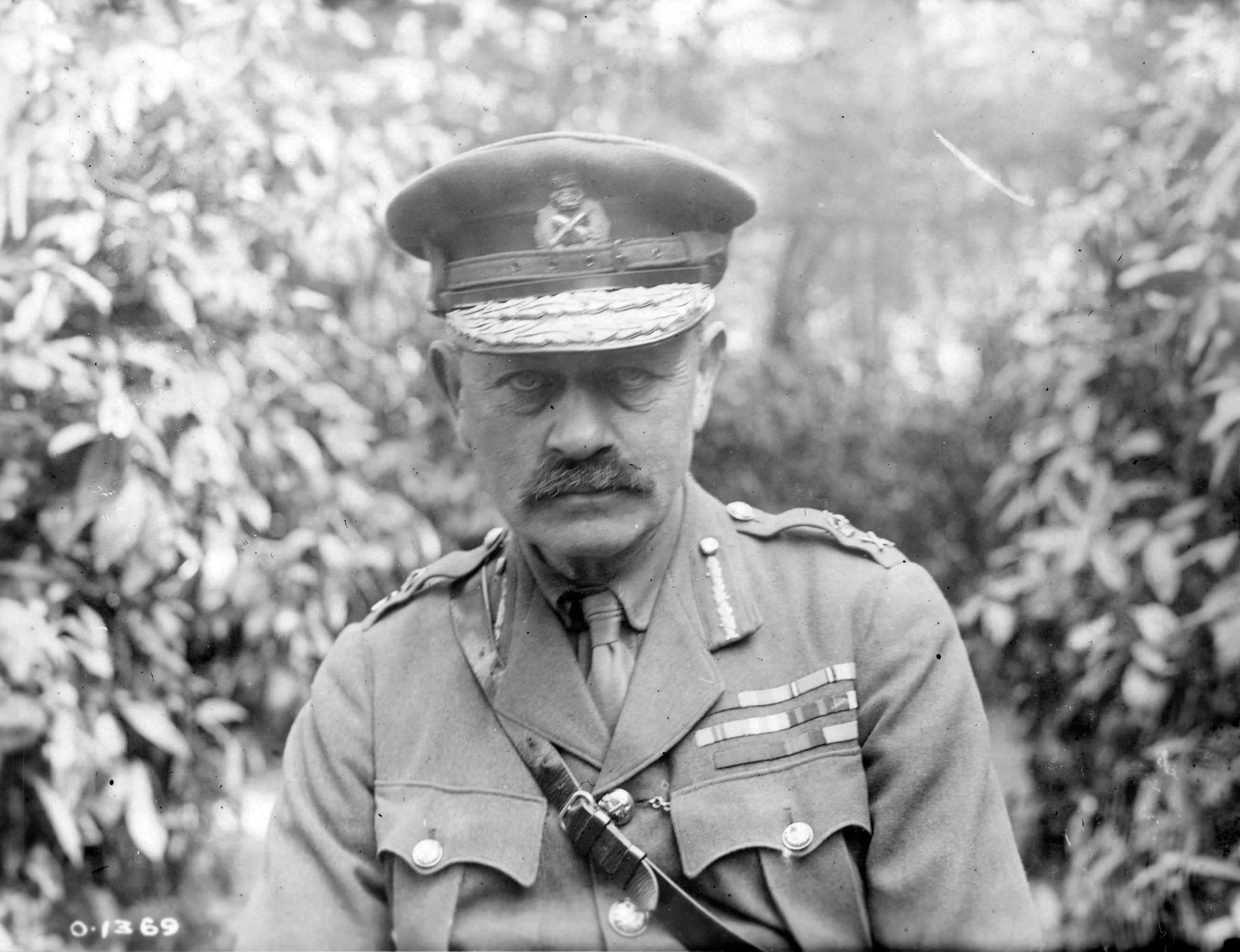
Byng during the battle

The plan divided the Canadian Corps advance into four coloured objective lines. The attack would be made on a front of 7,000 yd (4 mi; 6 km), with its centre opposite the village of Vimy, to the east of the ridge. The first objective, the Black Line, was the German forward defensive position. The final objective of the northern flank was the Red Line, taking the highest point on the ridge, the fortified knoll known as the Pimple, la Folie Farm, the Zwischen-Stellung (intermediate position) and the hamlet of Les Tilleuls. The southern two divisions were to achieve two more objectives, the Blue Line, encompassing the village of Thélus and the woods outside the village of Vimy and the Brown Line, which aimed at capturing Zwölfer-Graben (Twelve Trench) and the German second position. The infantry would advance close to a creeping barrage by field guns, advancing in timed 100 yd (100 m) increments. The medium and heavy howitzers would establish a series of standing barrages further ahead of the infantry against defensive positions.

The plan called for units to leapfrog as the advance progressed, to maintain momentum during the attack. The initial wave would capture and consolidate the Black Line and then push forward to the Red Line. The barrage would pause for reserve units to move up, then move forward with the units pushing beyond the Red Line to the Blue Line. Once the troops secured the Blue Line, advancing units would once again leapfrog them and capture the Brown Line. Conducted properly, the plan would leave the German forces little time to exit their deep dugouts and defend their positions against the infantry. If the corps maintained its schedule, the troops would advance as much as 4,000 yd (2.3 mi; 3.7 km) and have the majority of the ridge under control by 1:00 pm on the first day.

=== German defences ===
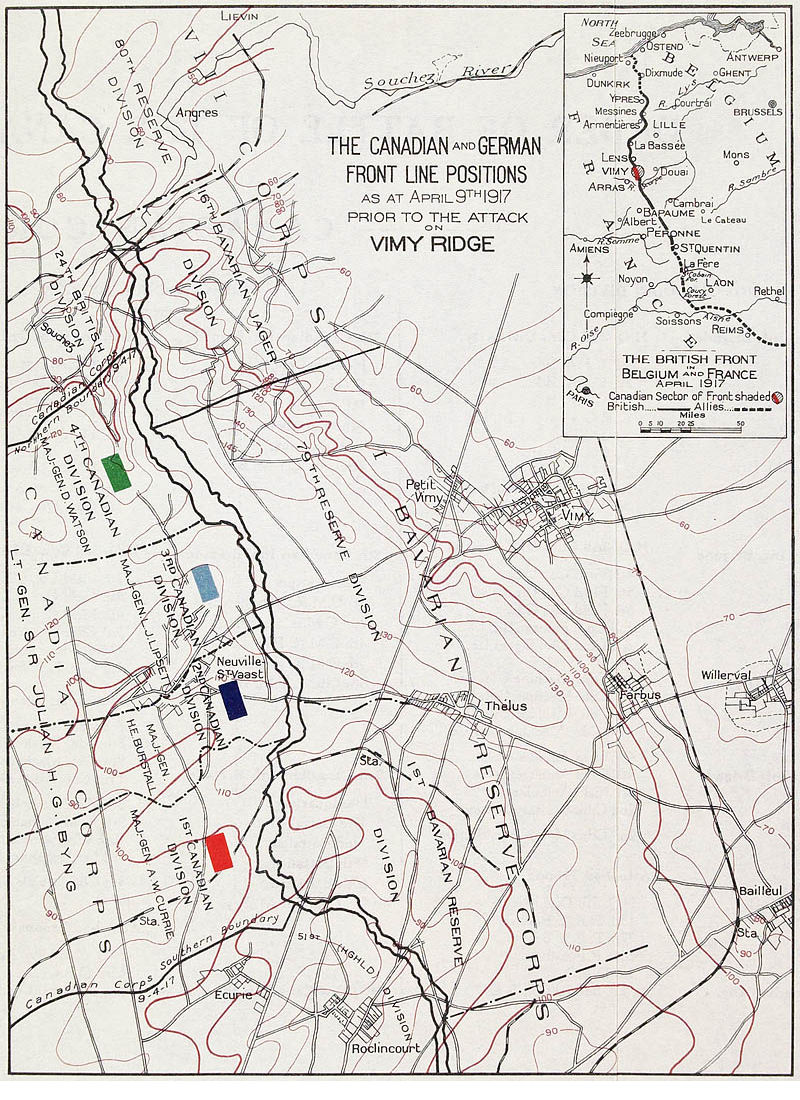
The position of the defending and attacking forces before the battle

The experience of the Battle of the Somme led the German command to conclude that the policy of rigidly defending a trench position was no longer effective against the firepower that the Entente armies had accumulated. Ludendorff published a new defensive doctrine in December 1916, in which deeper defences were to be built, within which the garrison would have room to manoeuvre, rather than rigidly holding successive lines of trenches. Along Vimy Ridge, the German forces had spent two years constructing fortifications designed for rigid defence. An extensive network of tunnels and trenches south of Neuville St Vaast was known as "The Labyrinth". Little reconstruction based upon the new defence-in-depth doctrine had been accomplished by April 1917 because the terrain made it impractical.

The ridge was 700 m (2,300 ft) across at its narrowest point, with a steep drop on the eastern side, all but eliminating the possibility of counterattacks if the ridge was captured. The Germans were apprehensive about the inherent weakness of the Vimy Ridge defences. Their defensive scheme was to maintain a front line defence of sufficient strength to withstand an initial assault and move operational reserves forward, before the enemy could consolidate their gains or overrun the remaining German positions. The German defence at Vimy Ridge relied largely on the firepower of machine guns.

Three divisions, comprising seven infantry regiments were responsible for the immediate defence of the ridge. The paper strength of each division was approximately 15,000 men but their actual strength was significantly lower. In 1917, a full-strength German rifle company was 264 men; at Vimy Ridge, each rifle company contained approximately 150 men. Each German regiment held a zone approximately 1,000 m (1,100 yd) wide, as far back as the rear area. When the Canadian Corps attacked, each German company faced two or more battalions of approximately 1,000 men each. Reserve divisions were kept about 15 mi (24 km) back instead of assembling close behind the second line, according to the defence-in-depth theory.

=== Artillery ===
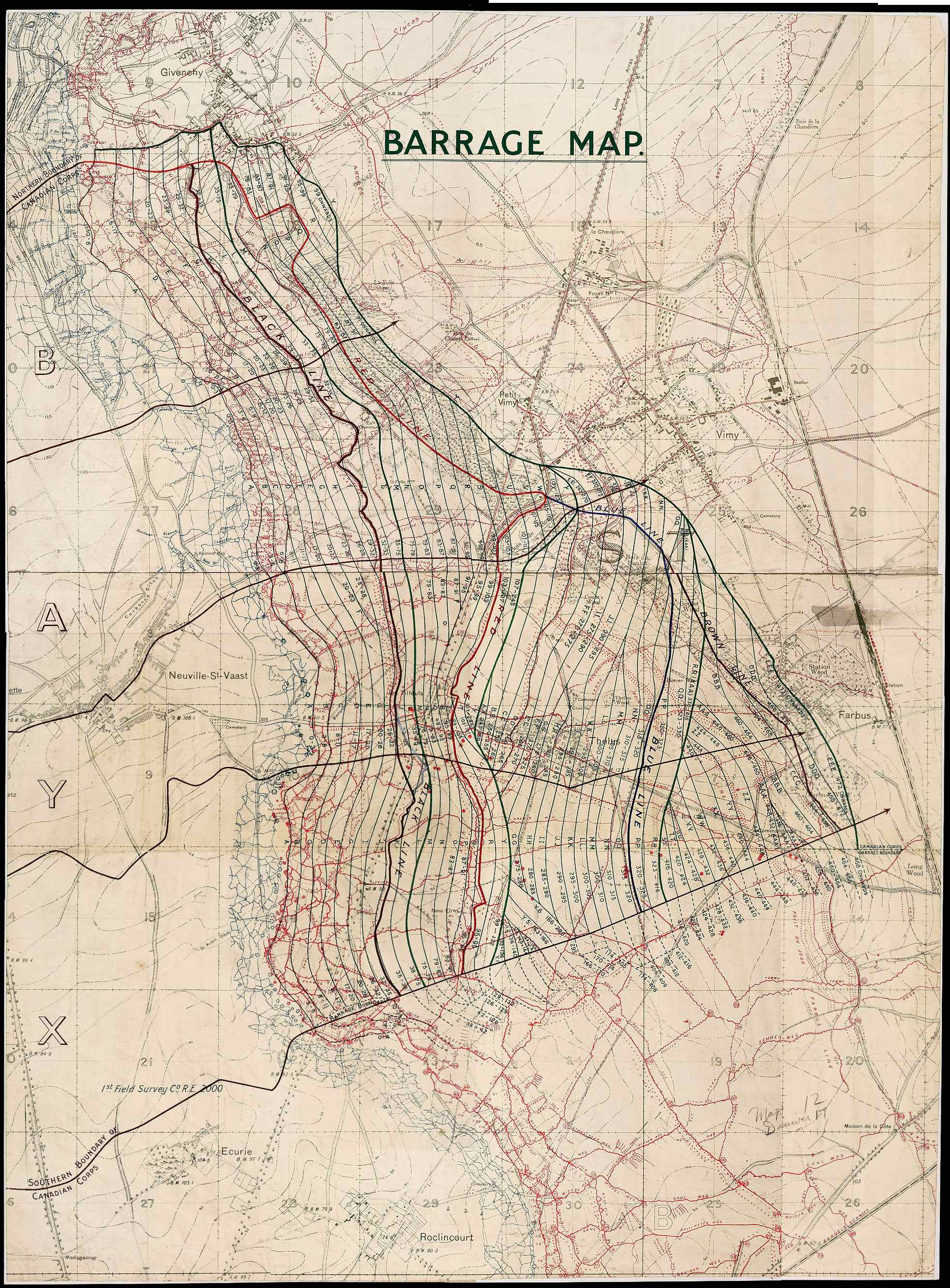
A map showing the rolling artillery barrage for the advance

The eight field artillery brigades of the Canadian Corps divisional artillery and two heavy artillery groups were reinforced with British artillery units. Four heavy artillery groups, nine field artillery brigades, three divisional artillery groups and the artillery complement of the 5th Division was attached to the Canadian Corps. Ten heavy artillery groups of the flanking I and XVII Corps were assigned tasks in support of the Canadian Corps. The artillery batteries of I Corps were particularly important because they enfiladed German gun positions behind Vimy Ridge.

The British provided twenty-four brigade artillery groups consisting of four hundred and eighty 18 pounder field guns, one hundred and thirty-eight 4.5 inch howitzers, ninety-six 2 inch trench mortars, twenty-four 9.45 inch mortars, supported by 245 siege guns and heavy mortars. This firepower gave a density of one heavy gun for every 20 m (20 yd) and one field gun for every 10 m (10 yd) of the corps frontage, representing a considerable average increase, including three times the heavy guns over the distribution of artillery at the Battle of the Somme in 1916.

On 8 February, the First Army issued a 3,000-word artillery plan devised by Horne and his principal artillery commander, Major General H. F. Mercer. Brigadier-General Edward Morrison developed and issued a 35-page multi-phased fire support plan called Canadian Corps Artillery Instruction No. 1 for the Capture of Vimy Ridge to support the efforts of the infantry. The Canadian Corps received three times the artillery normally assigned to a corps for regular operations. To manage the supply of the extra guns, the Royal Artillery staff officer, Major Alan Brooke, coordinated communication and transport plans to work with the barrage plans.

A 1.6 million shell allotment allowed the artillery along the Canadian Corps front to maintain a high rate of fire. Improvements in the quality of the shells ensured fewer duds. The new instantaneous No. 106 fuze greatly improved results, the fuse burst reliably with the slightest of contact, unlike older timed fuses, making it especially effective at wire cutting. Field units laid over 870 mi (1,400 km) of telegraph and field telephone cables, normally at a depth of 7 ft (2.1 m). The corps conducted counter-battery shoots before the battle. The First Army Field Survey Company printed barrage maps, artillery boards and counter-battery support with flash spotting groups and sound ranging sections. Using flash spotting, sound ranging and aerial reconnaissance from 16 Squadron and 1 & 2 Balloon Companies Royal Flying Corps (RFC) in the week before the battle, the counter-battery artillery (Lieutenant-Colonel Andrew McNaughton) fired 125,900 shells, harassing an estimated 83 per cent of the German gun positions.

=== Training ===
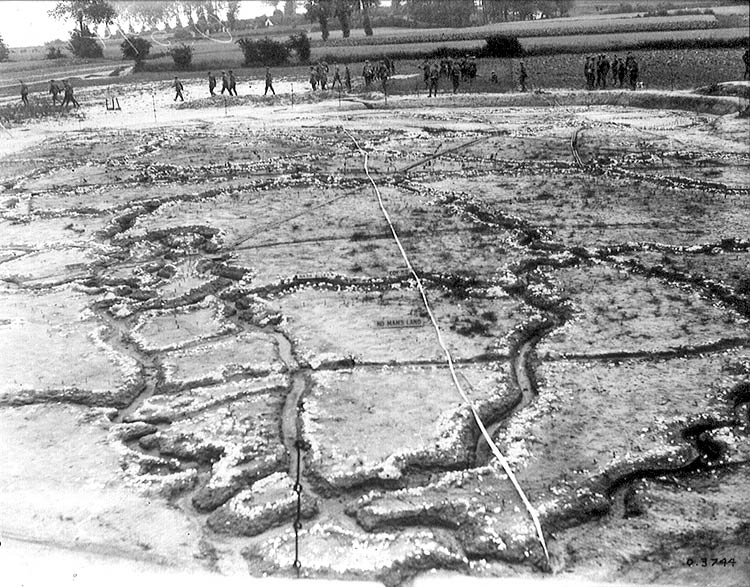
A large model of German trench lines

In February 1917, the British General Staff released a training pamphlet SS 143 Instructions for the Training of Platoons for Offensive Action, espousing the return to the pre-war emphasis on fire and movement tactics and the use of the platoon as the basic tactical unit. The pamphlet noted the importance of specialist hand grenade, rifle grenade, rifle and Lewis gun sections in suppressing enemy strong points by exploiting the characteristics of different weapons to fight forward, allowing other units to advance. Coupled with the observations and suggestions made by Currie in the report he submitted in January 1917 following the Verdun lectures, the Canadian Corps instilled the tactical change with vigour. The corps implemented the tactical doctrine for small units by assigning objectives down to the platoon. Assaulting infantry battalions used hills behind the lines as full-scale models of the battlefield.

Taped lines demarcated German trench lines while officers on horseback carried flags to represent the advancing front of the artillery barrage. Recognizing that leaders were likely to be wounded or killed, soldiers learned the jobs of those beside and above them. At the First Army headquarters, a large plasticine model of the Vimy sector was constructed and used to show commissioned and senior non-commissioned officers the topographical features of the battlefield and details of the German trench system. Upwards of 40,000 topographical trench maps were printed and distributed to ensure that even platoon sergeants and section commanders possessed a wider awareness of the battlefield. The new measures gave each platoon a clearer picture of how it fitted into the greater battle plan and in so doing, reduced the command problems that plagued First World War operations.

=== Underground operations ===
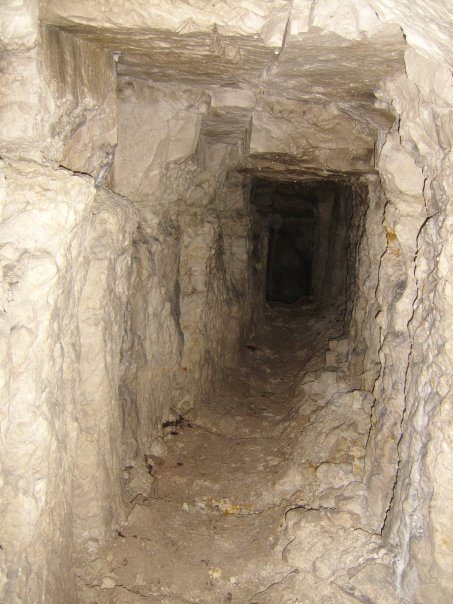
A British-dug fighting tunnel in the Vimy sector

Operations along the Vimy Ridge were accompanied by extensive excavations. The Arras–Vimy sector was conducive to tunnelling, owing to the soft, porous, yet extremely stable nature of the chalk underground. Mine warfare had been conducted on the Vimy sector since 1915 and Bavarian engineers had blown twenty mines in the sector by March 1915. By early 1916, German miners had gained an advantage over their French counterparts. British tunnelling companies of the Royal Engineers took over from the French between February and May 1916.

On their arrival, the British began offensive mining against German miners, first stopping the German underground advance and then developing a defensive strategy that prevented the Germans from gaining a tactical advantage by mining. From spring 1916, the British had deployed five tunnelling companies along the Vimy Ridge and during the first two months of their tenure of the area, 70 mines were fired, mostly by the Germans. Between October 1915 and April 1917 an estimated 150 French, British and German charges were fired in this 4.3 mi (7 km) sector of the Western Front.

In May 1916, Operation Schleswig-Holstein, a German infantry attack, forced the British back 700 yd (640 m), to stop British mining by capturing the shaft entrances. In the second half of 1916, the British constructed strong defensive underground positions and from August 1916, the Royal Engineers developed a mining scheme for a big infantry attack on the Vimy Ridge proposed for autumn 1916, although this was postponed. After September 1916, when the Royal Engineers had completed their network of defensive galleries along most of the front line, offensive mining largely ceased although activities continued until 1917. The British gallery network beneath Vimy Ridge eventually grew to a length of 7.5 mi (12 km).

The Canadian Corps was posted to the northern part of Vimy Ridge in October 1916 and preparations for an attack were revived in February 1917. Twelve subways, up to 1.2 km (0.75 mi) long were excavated at a depth of 10 m (33 ft) and used to connect reserve lines to front lines, permitting soldiers to advance to the front quickly, securely and unseen. Often incorporated into subways were light rail lines, hospitals, command posts, water reservoirs, ammunition stores, mortar and machine gun posts and communication centres. The Germans dug a number of similar tunnels on the Vimy front, to provide covered routes to the front line and protection for headquarters, resting personnel, equipment, and ammunition. (Note: These included the Prinz Arnulf, Volker and Schwaben tunnels.) The Germans also conducted counter-mining against the British tunnellers and destroyed a number of British attempts to plant mines under or near their lines. (Note: German counter-mining explosion; 35 t (34 long tons; 39 short tons) exploded near the Broadmarsh Crater (creating the Longfellow crater group) on 23 March 1917, 45 t (44 long tons; 50 short tons) exploded 26 March 1917 near the Pimple.)

Prior to the battle, the British tunnelling companies secretly laid 13 mines under German positions, to destroy surface fortifications before the assault. To protect some advancing troops from German machine gun fire as they crossed no man's land during the attack, eight smaller Wombat charges were laid at the end of the subways to allow troops to move more quickly and safely enter the German trench system by creating an elongated trench-depth crater that spanned the length of no man's land. At the same time, 19 crater groups existed along this section of the Western Front, each with several large craters.

To assess the consequences of infantry having to advance across cratered ground after a mining attack, officers from the Canadian Corps visited La Boisselle and Fricourt where the mines had been blown on the First day of the Somme. Their reports and the experience of the Canadians at The Actions of St Eloi Craters in April 1916, where mines had so altered and damaged the landscape as to render occupation of the mine craters by the infantry all but impossible, led to the decision to remove offensive mining from the central sector allocated to the Canadian Corps at Vimy Ridge. Further British mines in the area were vetoed following the blowing by the Germans on 23 March 1917 of nine craters along no man's land, as it was probable that the Germans were aiming to restrict an attack to predictable points. The three mines laid by 172nd Tunnelling Company were also dropped from the British plans. The mines were left in place after the assault and were only removed in the 1990s. Another mine, prepared by 176th Tunnelling Company against the German strongpoint known as the Pimple, was not completed in time for the attack. The gallery had been pushed silently through the clay, avoiding the sandy and chalky layers of the Vimy Ridge but by 9 April 1917 was still 21 m (70 ft) short of its target. In the end, two mines were blown before the attack, while three mines and two Wombat charges were fired to support the attack, including those forming a northern flank.

=== Trench raiding ===
Trench raiding involved making small-scale surprise attacks on enemy positions, often in the middle of the night for reasons of stealth. All belligerents employed trench raiding as a tactic to harass their enemy and gain intelligence. In the Canadian Corps trench raiding developed into a training and leadership-building mechanism. The size of a raid would normally be anything from a few men to an entire company, or more, depending on the size of the mission. The four months before the April attack saw the Canadian Corps execute 55 trench raids. Competition between units developed with competition for the honour of the greatest number of prisoners captured or most destruction wrought. The policy of aggressive trench raiding was not without its cost. A big trench raid on 13 February 1917, involving 900 men from the 4th Canadian Division, resulted in 150 casualties.

An even more ambitious trench raid, using chlorine gas, on 1 March 1917, once again by the 4th Canadian Division, failed and resulted in 637 casualties including two battalion commanders and a number of company commanders killed. This experience did not lessen the extent to which the Canadian Corps employed trench raiding, with raids being conducted nightly between 20 March and the opening of the offensive on 9 April, resulting in approximately 1,400 Canadian casualties. The Germans operated an active patrolling policy and although not as large and ambitious as those of the Canadian Corps, they also engaged in trench raiding. A German trench raid launched by 79 men against the 3rd Canadian Division on 15 March 1917 took prisoner and caused damage.

=== Air operations ===
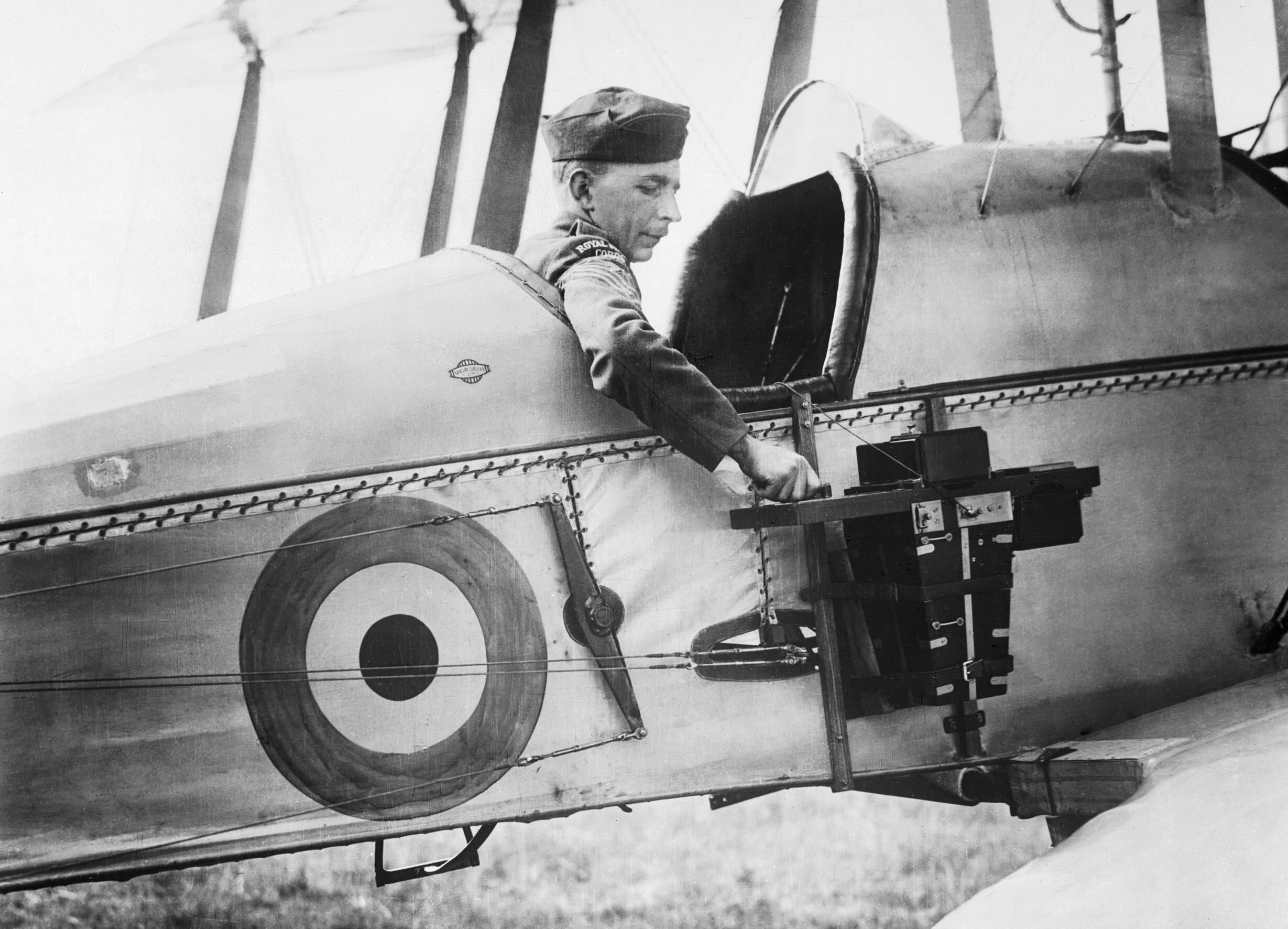
An observer of the Royal Flying Corps in a photographic reconnaissance aircraft, showing the camera

The RFC launched a determined effort to gain air superiority over the battlefield in support of the spring offensive. The Canadians considered activities such as artillery observation and photography of opposing trench systems, troop movements and gun emplacements essential to continue their offensive. The Royal Flying Corps deployed 25 squadrons with 365 aircraft along the Arras sector, outnumbering the Luftstreitkräfte (Imperial German Air Service) by 2-to-1. Byng was given use of 2 Squadron, 8 (Naval) Squadron, 25 Squadron, 40 Squadron and 43 Squadron, with 16 Squadron permanently attached to the Canadian Corps and employed exclusively for reconnaissance and artillery-observation.

Aerial reconnaissance was often a hazardous task because of the necessity of flying at slow speeds and low altitudes. The task was made more dangerous with the arrival of German air reinforcements, including the highly experienced and well equipped Jasta 11 which led to a sharp increase in RFC losses. Although significantly outnumbering the Germans, the RFC lost 131 aircraft during the first week of April (Bloody April). Despite the losses suffered by the RFC, the Luftstreitkräfte failed to prevent the British from carrying out its priority, air support of the army during the Battle of Arras with up-to-date aerial photographs and other reconnaissance information.

== Battle ==
=== Belligerents ===
The German 6th Army commander, General Ludwig von Falkenhausen, was responsible for the Cambrai–Lille sector and commanded 20 divisions, plus reserves. Vimy Ridge was principally defended by the ad hoc Gruppe Vimy based on the headquarters of the I Bavarian Reserve Corps (General der Infanterie Karl von Fasbender). A division of Gruppe Souchez the HQ of VIII Reserve Corps (General of the Infantry Georg Karl Wichura) defended the northernmost portion of the ridge. Three divisions held the defences opposite the Canadian Corps. The 16th Bavarian Division opposite the village of Souchez and the northernmost section of the ridge. The division had been created in January 1917 by amalgamating Bavarian formations and had so far only opposed the Canadian Corps. The 79th Reserve Division held the central section, including Hill 145, the peak. The 79th Reserve Division had fought for two years on the Eastern Front before being transferred to the Vimy sector at the end of February 1917. The 1st Bavarian Reserve Division had been in the Arras area since October 1914 and held the villages of Thélus, Bailleul and the southern slope of the ridge.

Byng commanded four attacking divisions, one division in reserve and numerous support units. He was supported to the north by the 24th Division, I Corps, which advanced north of the Souchez River and by the XVII Corps to the south. The 4th Canadian Division was responsible for the northern portion of the advance that included the capture of the highest point of the ridge, followed by the elaborately fortified Pimple, just west of the village of Givenchy-en-Gohelle. The 3rd Canadian Division was responsible for the narrow central section of the ridge, including the capture of La Folie Farm. The 2nd Canadian Division, that later included a brigade from the 5th Division, was directly south of the 3rd Canadian Division and entrusted with the capture of the village of Thélus. The 1st Canadian Division was responsible for the broad southern sector of the corps advance and expected to cover the longest distance. Byng held the 9th Canadian Brigade and the British 15th and 95th Brigades in corps reserve for contingencies that included the relief of forward troops, help in consolidating positions and aiding the 4th Canadian Division with the capture of the Pimple.

=== Preliminary attack ===
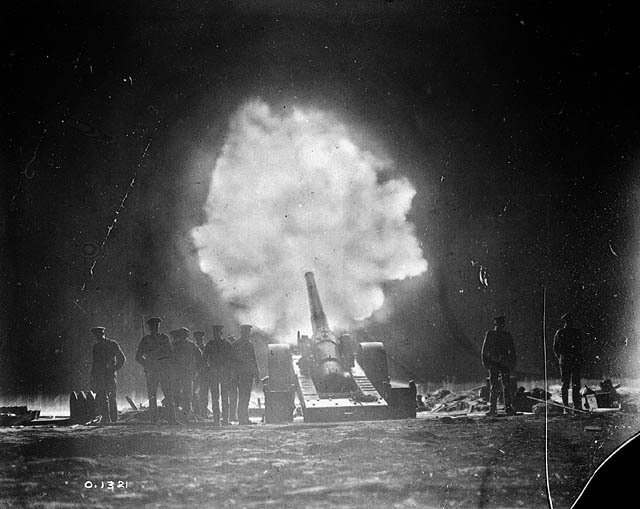
A 6-inch (150 mm) gun of the Royal Garrison Artillery behind Canadian lines, firing over Vimy Ridge at night

Foreign intelligence gathering by the Germans, big Allied trench raids and troop concentrations seen west of Arras, made it clear to the Germans that a spring offensive in the area was being prepared. In February 1917, a German-born Canadian soldier deserted and helped confirm many of the suspicions held by the Germans, providing them with a great deal of useful information. On 29 March four Canadians from the 31st Battalion were taken prisoner and gave much information under interrogation, including the plan of attack and a list of the divisions involved.

By March 1917, the 6th Army knew that an offensive was imminent and would include operations aimed at capturing Vimy Ridge. General of Infantry Ernst August Marx von Bachmeister, commanding the German 79th Reserve Division, reported in late March that he believed the Canadian Corps was moving into an echelon formation and were preparing for a big attack. The Germans quickly planned Operation Munich (Unternehmen München), a spoiling attack to capture the northern section of the Zouave Valley, along the northernmost portion of the Canadian front. Munich was not undertaken because the extent of Canadian Corps artillery fire made it impracticable.

The preliminary phase of the Canadian Corps artillery bombardment began on 20 March 1917, with a systematic two-week bombardment of German batteries, trenches and strong points. The Canadian Corps gunners paid particular attention to eliminating German barbed wire, a task made easier with the introduction of the No. 106 instantaneous fuse. Only half of the artillery fired at once and the intensity of the barrage was varied to confuse the Germans about Canadian intentions. Phase two lasted the week beginning 2 April 1917 and employed all of the guns supporting the Canadian Corps, massing the equivalent of a heavy gun for every 18 m (20 yd) and a field gun for every 9.1 m (10 yd). The German soldiers came to refer to the week before the attack as "the week of suffering". In the German account, their trenches and defensive works were almost completely demolished. The health and morale of the German troops suffered from the stress of remaining at the ready for eleven straight days under extremely heavy artillery bombardment.

Compounding German difficulties was the inability of ration parties to bring food supplies to the front lines. On 3 April, General von Falkenhausen ordered his reserve divisions to prepare to relieve front line divisions over the course of a long drawn-out defensive battle in a manner similar to the Battle of the Somme and the divisions were kept 24 km (15 mi) from the battlefield to avoid being shelled.

=== Main assault ===
==== 9 April ====
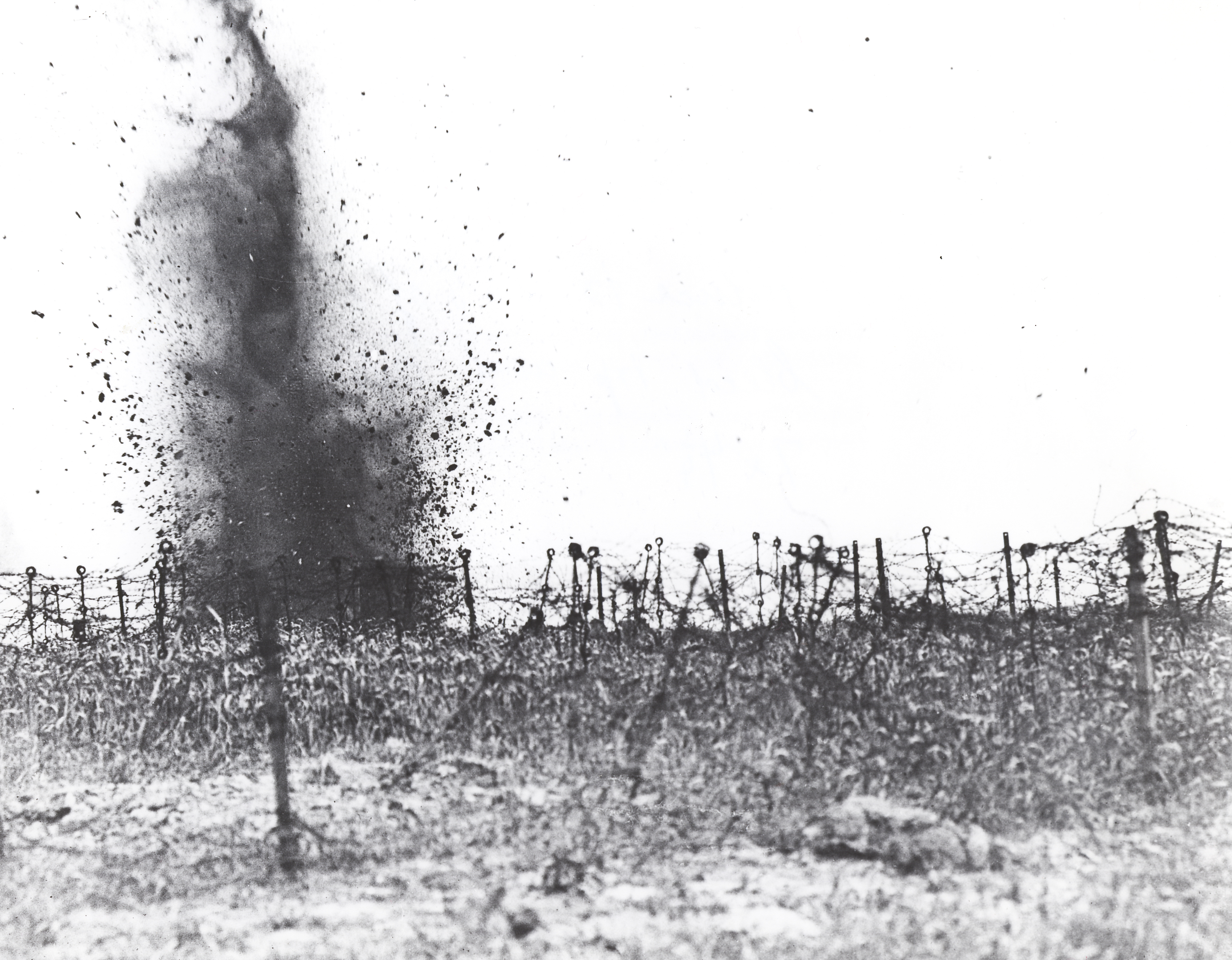
Artillery-fire on a field of barbed wire at Vimy Ridge

The attack was to begin at 5:30 am on Easter Monday, 9 April 1917. The attack was originally planned for the morning of 8 April (Easter Sunday) but it was postponed for 24 hours at the request of the French. During the late hours of 8 April and early morning of 9 April the men of the leading and supporting wave of the attack were moved into their forward assembly positions. The weather was cold and later changed to sleet and snow. Although physically discomforting for everyone, the north-westerly storm provided some advantage to the assaulting troops by blowing snow in the faces of the defending troops.

Light Canadian and British artillery bombardments continued throughout the night but stopped in the few minutes before the attack, as the artillery recalibrated their guns in preparation for the synchronized barrage. At 5:30 am, every artillery piece at the disposal of the Canadian Corps began firing. Thirty seconds later, engineers detonated the mine charges laid under no man's land and the German trench line, destroying a number of German strong points and creating secure communication trenches directly across no man's land.

Field guns fired a barrage that mostly advanced at a rate of 100 yd (91 m) in three minutes while medium and heavy howitzers fired standing barrages further ahead against defensive systems. During the early fighting, the German divisional artilleries, despite many losses, were able to maintain their defensive fire. As the Canadian infantry advanced, they overran many of the German guns because large numbers of their draught horses had been killed in the initial gas attack. The 1st, 2nd and 3rd Canadian Divisions reached the Black Line, by 6:25 am. The 4th Canadian Division encountered a great deal of trouble during its advance and was unable to complete its first objective until some hours later. After the pause when the 1st, 2nd and 3rd Canadian Divisions consolidated their positions, the advance resumed. Shortly after 7:00 am, the 1st Canadian Division captured the left half of its second objective, the Red Line and moved the 1st Canadian Brigade forward to mount an attack on the remainder. The 2nd Canadian Division reported reaching the Red Line and capturing the village of Les Tilleuls at approximately the same time.

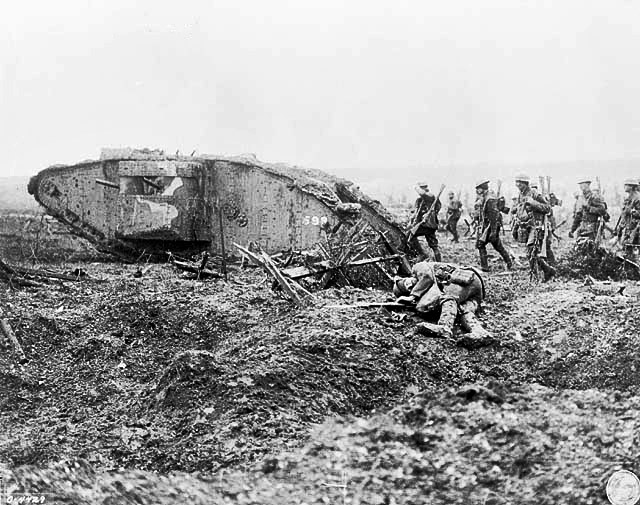
2nd Canadian Division soldiers advance behind a tank

The advance of the 3rd Canadian Division was preceded by a mine explosion that killed many troops of Reserve Infantry Regiment 262 in the front line. The survivors could do no more than man temporary lines of resistance until later occupying the German third line. The southern section of the 3rd Canadian Division was able to reach the Red Line at the western edge of the Bois de la Folie at around 7:30 am. At 9:00 am the division learned of its exposed left flank, as the 4th Canadian Division had not yet captured Hill 145. The 3rd Canadian Division had to establish a divisional defensive flank to its north. Although the German commanders were able to communicate with the front line, the speed of the Canadian advance was too quick to react to in time.

The advance of the 4th Canadian Division, collapsed almost immediately after exiting their trenches. The commanding officer of one of the assaulting battalions had requested that the artillery leave a portion of the German trench undamaged. Machine-gun nests in the undamaged sections of the German line shot down much of the troops on the right flank. The progress on the left flank was eventually impeded by harassing fire from the Pimple, made worse when the creeping barrage got too far ahead of the advancing troops. The 4th Canadian Division did not attempt a further frontal assault that the afternoon.

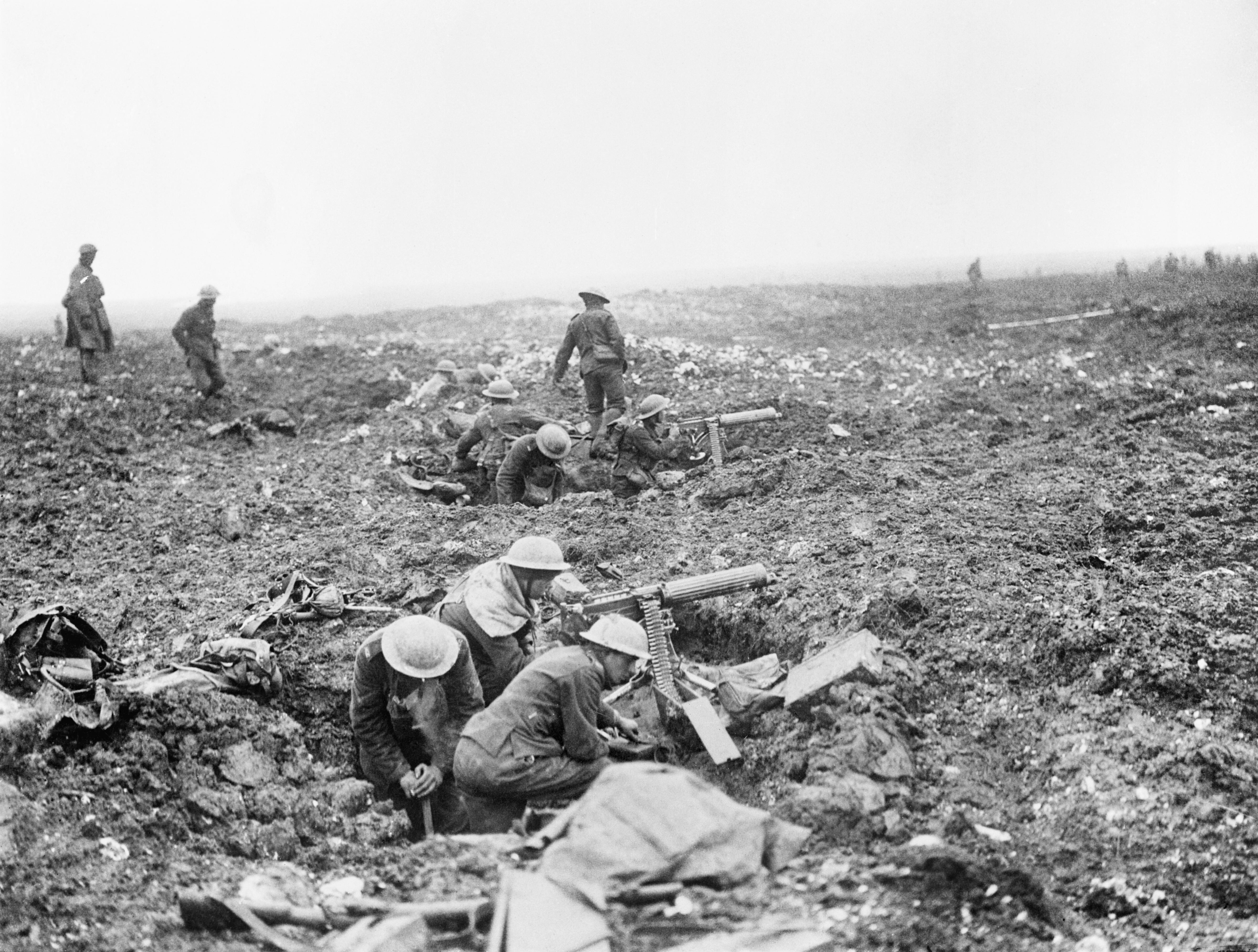
Canadian machine gunners operating from craters on the plateau above the ridge

Reserve units from the 4th Canadian Division came forward and once again attacked the German positions on the top of the ridge. Persistent attacks eventually forced the German troops holding the southwestern portion of Hill 145 to withdraw after they ran out of ammunition, mortar rounds, and grenades. (Note: Hill 145 is the site of the present-day Vimy Memorial.) Towards noon, the 79th Reserve Division was ordered to recapture the portions of its third line lost during the Canadian attack. It was not until 6:00 pm that the force was able to counter-attack, clearing the Canadians out of the ruined village of Vimy, but not recapturing the third line south of the village. By that night, the German forces holding the top of the ridge believed they had overcome the immediate crisis. German reinforcements began arriving and by the late evening, portions of the 111th Division occupied the third line near Acheville and Arleux, with the remainder of the division arriving the following day.

==== 10 April ====
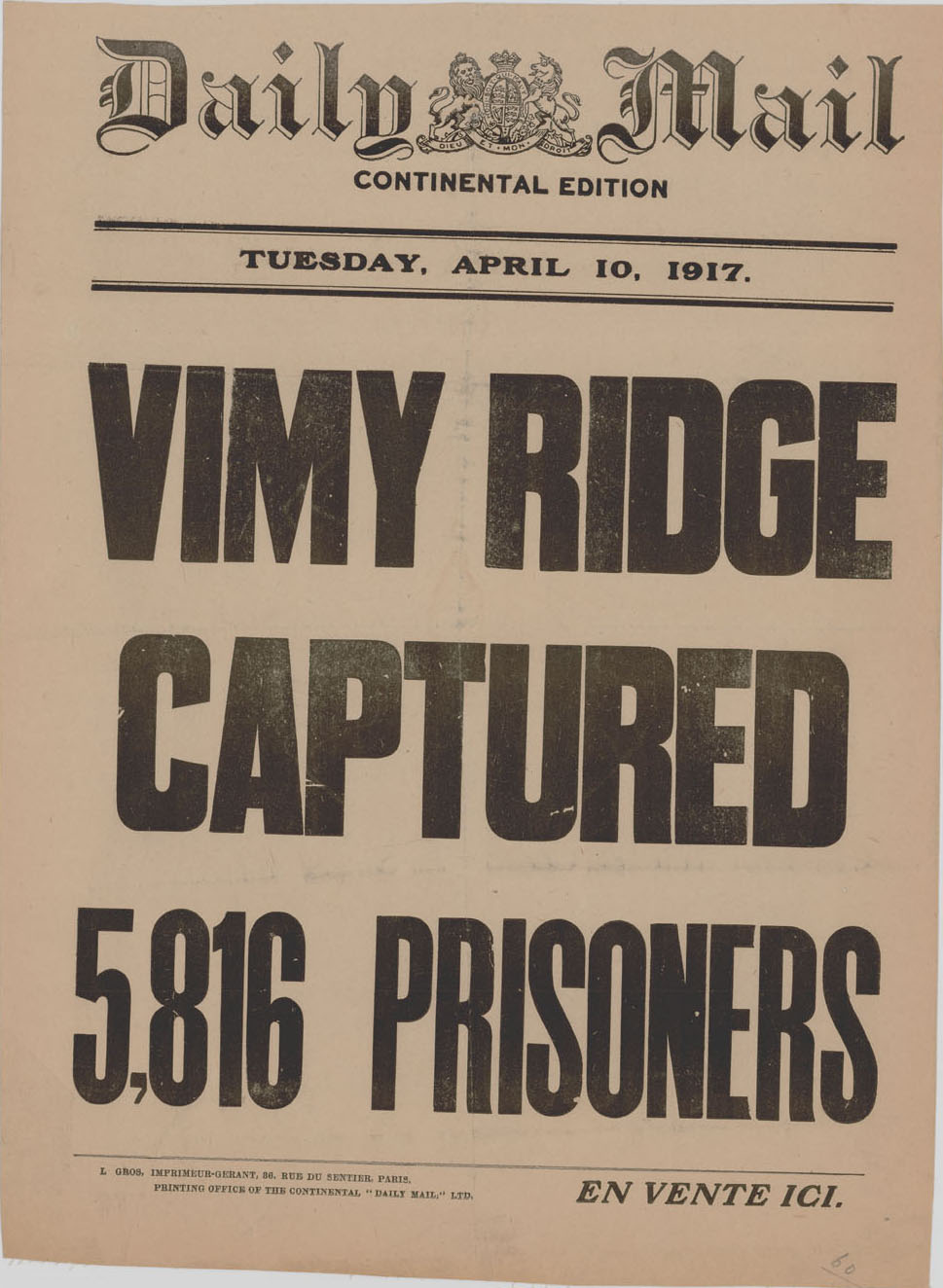
The front page of the Daily Mail on 10 April 1917

The British moved three fresh brigades up to the Red Line by 9:30 am on 10 April to support the advance of the 1st and 2nd Canadian Division, whereupon they were to leapfrog existing units occupying the Red Line and advance to the Blue Line. Fresh units including two sections of tanks and the 13th British Brigade were called up from reserve to support the advance of the 2nd Canadian Division. By approximately 11:00 am, the Blue Line, including Hill 135 and the village of Thélus, had been captured.

To permit the troops time to consolidate the Blue Line, the advance halted and the barrage remained stationary for 90 minutes while machine guns were brought forward. Shortly before 1:00 pm, the advance recommenced with both the 1st and 2nd Canadian Divisions reporting their final objective. The tank-supported advance via Farbus and directed at the rear of the 79th Reserve Division was eventually halted by concentrated German fire short of the village. The Canadian 1st and 2nd Divisions were nonetheless able to secure the Brown Line by approximately 2:00 pm.

The 4th Canadian Division had made an attempt to capture the northern half of Hill 145 at around 3:15 pm, briefly capturing the peak before a German counterattack retook the position. The Germans occupying the small salient on the ridge soon found themselves being attacked along their flanks by continuously reinforced Canadian Corps troops. When it became obvious that the position was completely outflanked and there was no prospect of reinforcement, the German troops pulled back. The German forces were evacuated off the ridge with German artillery batteries moved west of the Vimy–Bailleul railway embankment or to the Oppy–Méricourt line. By nightfall of 10 April, the only Canadian objective not yet achieved was the capture of the Pimple.

==== 12 April ====
The 4th Canadian Division faced difficulties at the start of the battle that forced it to delay its assault on the Pimple until 12 April. The Pimple was initially defended by the 16th Bavarian Infantry Division but the Canadian Corps' preliminary artillery bombardment leading up to the assault on 9 April caused heavy casualties amongst its ranks. On 11 April, the 4th Guards Infantry Division first reinforced and then relieved affected 16th Bavarian Infantry Division units. The night before the attack, artillery harassed German positions while a gas section of Royal Engineers, employing Livens Projectors, fired more than 40 drums of gas directly into the village of Givenchy-en-Gohelle to cause confusion.

The defending German troops managed to drive back the initial Canadian assaults at around 4:00 am using small arms fire. The 10th Canadian Brigade attacked once again at 5:00 am, this time supported by a significant amount of artillery and the 24th Division of I Corps to the north. The German defensive artillery fire was late and too light to cause the assaulting troops great difficulty, allowing the Canadian Corps to exploit wide gaps and break into the German positions. The 10th Canadian Brigade, assisted by snow and a westerly wind, fought hastily entrained German troops to capture the entire Pimple by 6:00 pm.

== Aftermath ==
=== Analysis ===
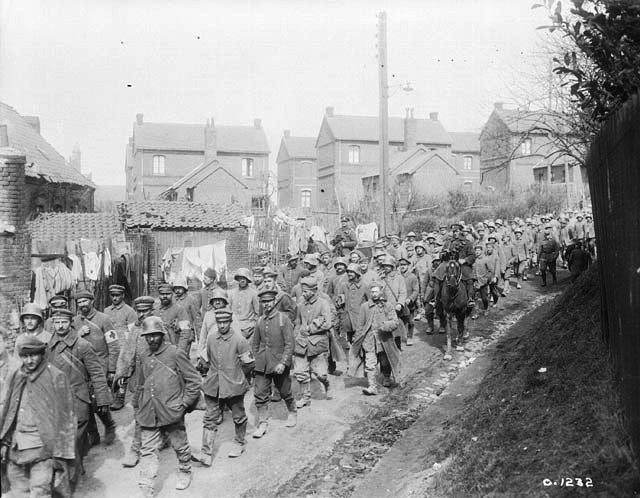
German soldiers captured during the battle

By nightfall on 12 April 1917, the Canadian Corps occupied the ridge, having suffered 10,602 casualties; 3,598 of whom had been killed and 7,004 wounded. The 6th Army casualties were not known at first in the disorganization of the defeat. Later sources state around 20,000 casualties; German historians credit the high number of German casualties to Canadian and British artillery. Approximately 4,000 men were taken prisoner. The German Historical Service estimated that the 6th Army suffered 79,418 casualties during April and May 1917, 22,792 were classified as missing. Crown Prince Rupprecht estimated 85,000 casualties for the 6th Army, with 3,404 men taken prisoner at Vimy Ridge. Losses of the 79th Reserve Division from 1 to 11 April were 3,473 and in the 1st Bavarian Reserve Division 3,133. Casualties from the bombardment amongst reinforcements and Eingreif divisions are additional.

Following the defeat, the chief of the German General Staff, Field Marshal Paul von Hindenburg, ordered Oberste Heeresleitung (OHL, Supreme Army Command) to conduct a court of enquiry into the defensive collapse of the Arras sector. The court concluded that the 6th Army headquarters had disregarded reports from commanders in the front line noting a possible imminent attack and reserve units were too distant to counter-attack before the Canadians could consolidate. The court concluded that 6th Army commander General Ludwig von Falkenhausen failed to apply an elastic defence according to German defensive doctrine. Instead, the defensive system comprised strong points and lines of resistance, which the Allied artillery had isolated and destroyed. Hindenburg removed Falkenhausen from his command and transferred him to Belgium, where he served the remainder of the war as governor-general.

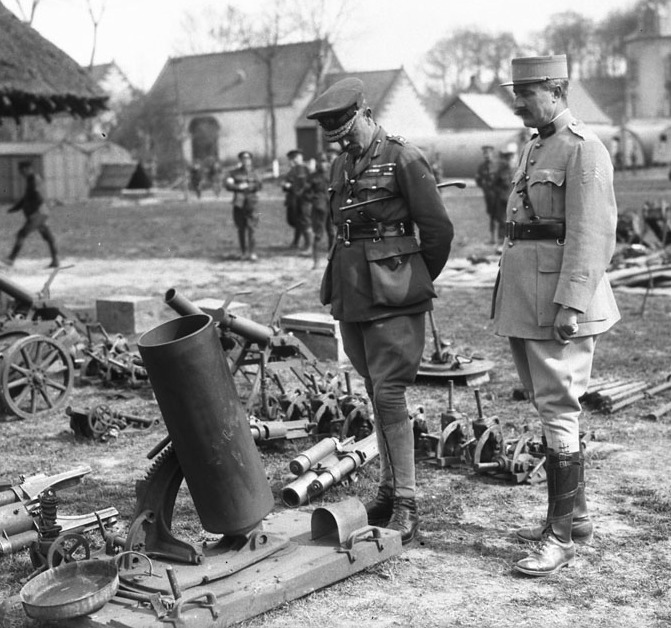
Lt.-Gen. Sir Julian Byng views equipment captured during the battle. The mortar in foreground is a 24 cm LadungsWerfer Ehrhardt.

German military commanders did not consider the Canadian Corps' capture of Vimy Ridge a defeat. Contemporary German sources viewed the action, at worst, as a draw, given that no breakthrough followed the attack. The Germans did not try to recapture the ridge, even during the Spring Offensive in 1918 and it remained under British control until the end of the war. The loss of Vimy Ridge forced the Germans to reassess their defensive strategy in the area. Instead of mounting a counterattack, they pursued a scorched earth policy and retreated to the Oppy–Méricourt line. The failure of the Nivelle Offensive in the week after the Battle of Arras placed pressure on Field Marshal Douglas Haig to keep the Germans occupied in the Arras sector to minimize French losses. The Canadian Corps participated in several of these actions including the Battle of Arleux and the Third Battle of the Scarpe in late April and early May 1917. (Note: On 7 October 1919, Byng was raised to the peerage as Baron Byng of Vimy, of Thorpe-le-Soken in the County of Essex. The next month, he retired from the Army.)

=== Awards ===
==== Victoria Cross ====
Four members of the Canadian Corps were awarded a Victoria Cross, highest military award of the British honours system for their actions during the battle:

- Private William Johnstone Milne, 16th (Canadian Scottish) Battalion
- Lance-Sergeant Ellis Wellwood Sifton, 18th (Western Ontario) Battalion
- Private John George Pattison, 50th (Calgary) Battalion
- Captain Thain Wendell MacDowell, 38th (Ottawa) Battalion

==== Pour le Mérite ====
At least two Orders Pour le Mérite, the Kingdom of Prussia's highest military order, were awarded to German commanders for their actions during the battle.

- Oberstleutnant Wilhelm von Goerne, commander of Prussian Reserve Infantry Regiment 261, of the 79th Reserve Division.
- General of the Infantry Georg Wichura, commander of the VIII Reserve Corps (Gruppe Souchez).

== Commemoration ==
=== Influence on Canada ===
The Battle of Vimy Ridge has considerable significance for Canada. (Note: On importance to Canada, see Inglis. Outside of Canada the battle has much less significance and may simply be noted as being one part of the larger Battle of Arras.) Although the battle is not generally considered the greatest achievement of the Canadian Corps in strategic importance or results obtained, it was the first instance in which all four Canadian divisions, made up of troops drawn from all parts of the country, fought together. The image of national unity and achievement is what, according to one of many recent patriotic narratives, initially gave the battle importance for Canada.

According to Pierce, "The historical reality of the battle has been reworked and reinterpreted in a conscious attempt to give purpose and meaning to an event that came to symbolize Canada's coming of age as a nation". That Canadian national identity and nationhood were born out of the battle is an opinion that in the late twentieth century became widely held in military and general histories of Canada.

McKay and Swift contend that the theory that Vimy Ridge is a source of Canada's rise as a nation is highly contested and developed in the latter part of the twentieth century after most of those who experienced the Great War had died but in 1919 Hopkins had attributed to F.A. MacKenzie the recognition "...that Dominions sharing the common burden shall share the common direction of the Empire's war policy" and related Lloyd George's commitment that the Dominions would not again be engaged in wars without consultation.

=== Vimy Memorial ===
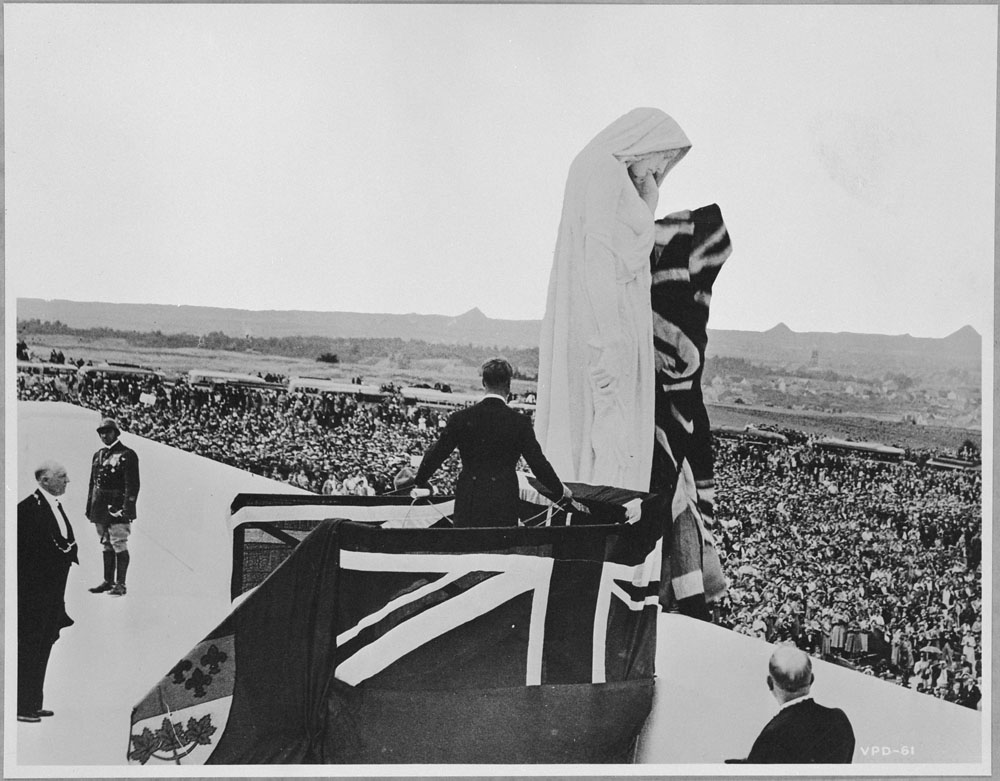
King Edward VIII unveiling the figure Canada Bereft on the Vimy Ridge Memorial in 1936

The Canadian National Vimy Memorial is Canada's largest overseas war memorial. Located on the highest point of the Vimy Ridge, the memorial commemorates Canadian Expeditionary Force members killed during the First World War and those killed in France during the First World War with no known grave. France granted Canada perpetual use of a section of land at Vimy Ridge in 1922 for a battlefield park and memorial. A 100 ha (250-acre) portion of the former battlefield is preserved as part of the memorial park that surrounds the monument. The grounds of the site are still honeycombed with wartime tunnels, trenches, craters and unexploded munitions and are largely closed for public safety. A section of preserved trenches and a portion of a tunnel have been made accessible to visitors.

The memorial was designed by Toronto architect and sculptor Walter Seymour Allward, who described it as a "sermon against the futility of war". The memorial took eleven years and cost $1.5 million ($27.07 million in present terms) to build. The unveiling was conducted on 26 July 1936, by King Edward VIII accompanied by President Lebrun of France and a crowd of over 50,000 people, including at least 6,200 Canadian veterans and their families. (Note: The Canadian War Museum cites a crowd of 100,000.)

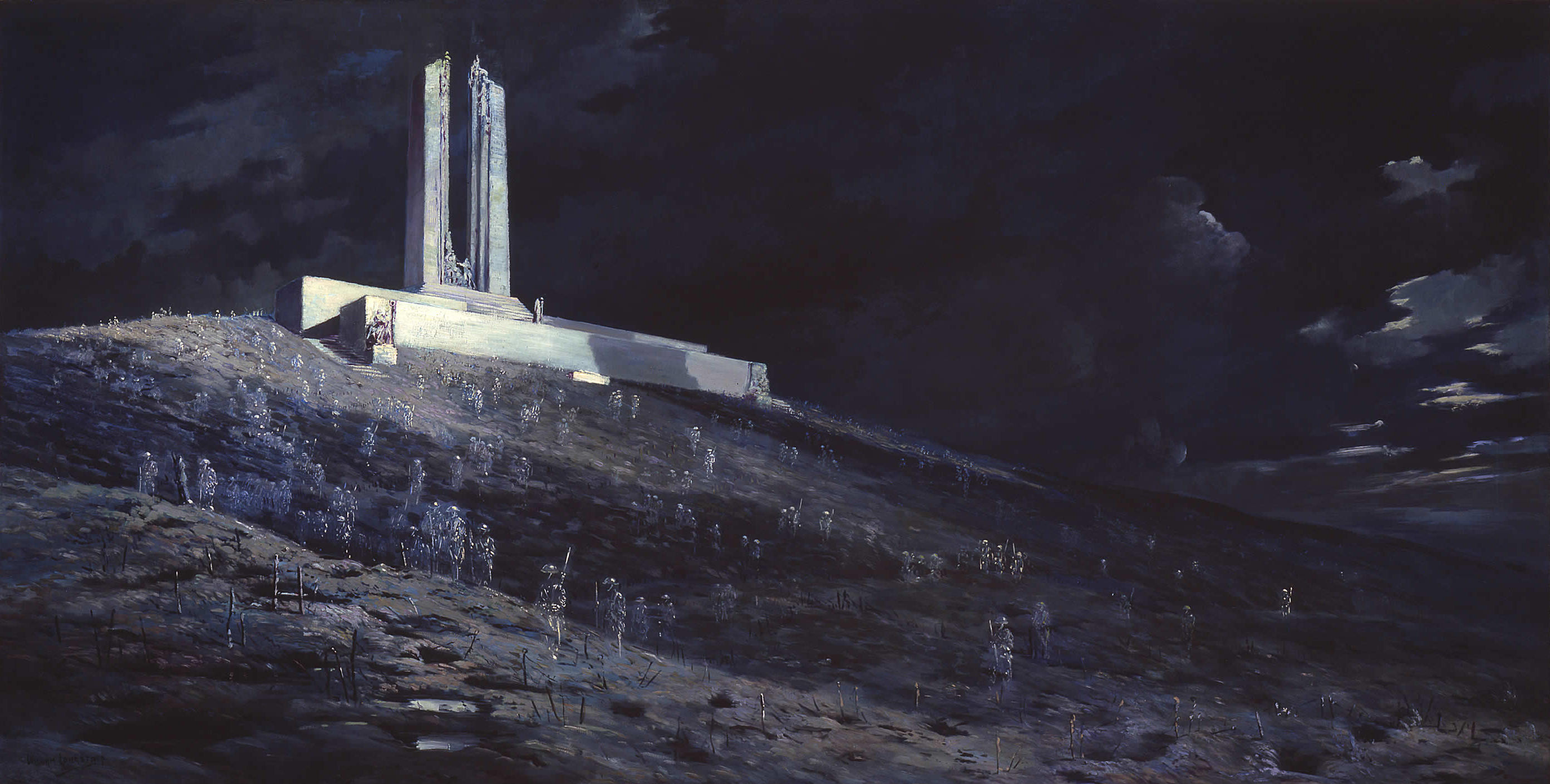
Ghosts of Vimy Ridge, painting by Will Longstaff

The Prime Minister of Canada, Mackenzie King, was absent as he had not fought in the war and was reluctant to meet veterans. Mackenzie King's harsh treatment of Byng during the 1926 King–Byng affair caused many veterans to despise him and he felt that a war veteran from the Cabinet should attend in his place. On the day, four federal government ministers and four Canadian Army General officers attended the unveiling. Edward VIII thanked France, in English and French, for its generosity and assured those assembled that Canada would never forget its war missing and dead.

A restoration project began in 2004, which included general cleaning and the recarving of many inscribed names. Queen Elizabeth II rededicated the monument on 9 April 2007, during a ceremony commemorating the 90th anniversary of the battle. Veterans Affairs Canada maintains the memorial site. The commemoration at the memorial on 9 April 2017 for the 100th anniversary of the Battle of Vimy Ridge was attended by the Prime Minister of Canada, Justin Trudeau; the Governor General of Canada, David Johnston; Charles, Prince of Wales; Prince William, Duke of Cambridge; Prince Harry and the President of France, Francois Hollande.

== Bibliography ==
- Barris, Ted (2007), Victory at Vimy: Canada Comes of Age, April 9–12, 1917, Toronto: Thomas Allen Publishers, ISBN 978-0-88762-253-3
- Barton, Peter; Doyle, Peter; Vandewalle, Johan (2004), Beneath Flanders Fields: The Tunnellers' War 1914–1918, Montreal & Kingston: McGill-Queen's University Press, ISBN 978-0-7735-2949-6
- Bechthold, Mike (2007), "In the Shadow of Vimy Ridge: The Canadian Corps in April and May 1917", in Hayes, Geoffrey; Iarocci, Andrew; Bechthold, Mike (eds.), Vimy Ridge: A Canadian Reassessment, Waterloo: Wilfrid Laurier University Press, pp. 239–264, ISBN 978-0-88920-508-6
- Boire, Michael (1992), "The Underground War: Military Mining Operations in support of the attack on Vimy Ridge, 9 April 1917" (PDF), Canadian Military History, I (1–2), Laurier Centre for Military Strategic and Disarmament Studies: 15–24, ISSN 1195-8472, archived from the original (PDF) on 5 March 2009
- Boire, Michael (2007), "The Battlefield before the Canadians, 1914–1916", in Hayes, Geoffrey; Iarocci, Andrew; Bechthold, Mike (eds.), Vimy Ridge: A Canadian Reassessment, Waterloo: Wilfrid Laurier University Press, pp. 51–61, ISBN 978-0-88920-508-6
- Brennan, Patrick (2007), "Julian Byng and Leadership in the Canadian Corps", in Hayes, Geoffrey; Iarocci, Andrew; Bechthold, Mike (eds.), Vimy Ridge: A Canadian Reassessment, Waterloo: Wilfrid Laurier University Press, pp. 87–104, ISBN 978-0-88920-508-6
- Brown, Eric; Cook, Tim (2011). "The 1936 Vimy Pilgrimage". Canadian Military History. XX (2). Laurier Centre for Military Strategic and Disarmament Studies: 33–54.
- Campbell, David (2007), "The 2nd Canadian Division: A 'Most Spectacular Battle'", in Hayes, Geoffrey; Iarocci, Andrew; Bechthold, Mike (eds.), Vimy Ridge: A Canadian Reassessment, Waterloo: Wilfrid Laurier University Press, pp. 171–192, ISBN 978-0-88920-508-6
- Chasseaud, Peter (1999), Artillery's Astrologers: A History of British Survey and Mapping on the Western Front 1914–1918, Lewes: Mapbooks, ISBN 978-0-9512080-2-1
- Cook, Tim (1999), "'A Proper Slaughter': The March 1917 Gas Raid at Vimy" (pdf), Canadian Military History, VIII (2), Laurier Centre for Military Strategic and Disarmament Studies: 7–24, ISSN 1195-8472, archived from the original on 4 March 2016
- Cook, Tim (2007), "The Gunners of Vimy Ridge: 'We are Hammering Fritz to Pieces'", in Hayes, Geoffrey; Iarocci, Andrew; Bechthold, Mike (eds.), Vimy Ridge: A Canadian Reassessment, Waterloo: Wilfrid Laurier University Press, pp. 105–124, ISBN 978-0-88920-508-6
- Corkerry, Shaun (2001), Instructions for the Training of Divisions for Offensive Action 1916, Instructions for the Training of Platoons for Offensive Action 1917, Buckinghamshire: Military Press, ISBN 978-0-85420-250-8
- Evans, Suzanne (9 February 2007). Mothers of Heroes, Mothers of Martyrs: World War I and the Politics of Grief. Montreal: McGill-Queen's University Press. ISBN 978-0-7735-3188-8.
- Falls, Cyril (1992) [1940], Military Operations: France and Belgium 1917: The German Retreat to the Hindenburg Line and the Battles of Arras, History of the Great War Based on Official Documents, vol. I, Nashville: The Battery Press, ISBN 978-0-89839-180-0
- Farndale, General Sir Martin (1986), Western Front, 1914–1918, History of the Royal Regiment of Artillery, Woolwich: Royal Artillery Institution, ISBN 1-870114-00-0
- Farr, Don (2007), The Silent General: A Biography of Haig's Trusted Great War Comrade-in-Arms, Solihull: Helion, ISBN 978-1-874622-99-4
- Godefroy, Andrew (2007a), "The 4th Canadian Division: 'Trenches Should Never be Saved'", in Hayes, Geoffrey; Iarocci, Andrew; Bechthold, Mike (eds.), Vimy Ridge: A Canadian Reassessment, Waterloo: Wilfrid Laurier University Press, pp. 211–224, ISBN 978-0-88920-508-6
- Godefroy, Andrew (2007b), "The German Army at Vimy Ridge", in Hayes, Geoffrey; Iarocci, Andrew; Bechthold, Mike (eds.), Vimy Ridge: A Canadian Reassessment, Waterloo: Wilfrid Laurier University Press, pp. 225–238, ISBN 978-0-88920-508-6
- Granatstein, Jack Lawrence (2004), Canada's Army: Waging War and Keeping the Peace, Toronto: University of Toronto Press, ISBN 978-0-8020-8696-9
- Hayes, Geoffrey (2007), "The 3rd Canadian Division: Forgotten Victory", in Hayes, Geoffrey; Iarocci, Andrew; Bechthold, Mike (eds.), Vimy Ridge: A Canadian Reassessment, Waterloo: Wilfrid Laurier University Press, pp. 193–210, ISBN 978-0-88920-508-6
- Hopkins, J. Castell (1919), Canada at War, 1914–1918: A Record of Heroism and Achievement, Toronto: Canadian Annual Review, OCLC 869410882, OL 19804038M
- Hucker, Jacqueline (2007). "The Meaning and Significance of the Vimy Monument". In Hayes, Geoffrey; Iarocci, Andrew; Bechthold, Mike (eds.). Vimy Ridge: A Canadian Reassessment. Waterloo, ONT: Wilfrid Laurier University Press. pp. 279–290. ISBN 978-0-88920-508-6.
- Humphries, Mark Osborne (2007), ""Old Wine in New Bottles": A Comparison of British and Canadian Preparations for the Battle of Arras", in Hayes, Geoffrey; Iarocci, Andrew; Bechthold, Mike (eds.), Vimy Ridge: A Canadian Reassessment, Waterloo: Wilfrid Laurier University Press, pp. 65–85, ISBN 978-0-88920-508-6
- Inglis, Dave (1995), Vimy Ridge: 1917–1992, A Canadian Myth over Seventy Five Years, Burnaby: Simon Fraser University, ISBN 978-0-612-06688-5
- Jones, Simon (2010). Underground Warfare 1914–1918. Barnsley: Pen & Sword Military. ISBN 978-1-84415-962-8.
- McGill, Harold W. (2007), Norris, Marjorie (ed.), Medicine and Duty: The World War I Memoir of Captain Harold W. McGill, Medical Officer, 31st Battalion, C.E.F, Calgary: University of Calgary Press, ISBN 978-1-55238-193-9
- McKay, Ian; Swift, Jamie (2016). The Vimy Trap: Or, How We Learned to Stop Worrying and Love the Great War. Toronto: Between the Lines. ISBN 978-1-77113-275-6.
- Meek, John F. (1971). Over the Top! The Canadian Infantry in the First World War. Orangeville, Ont.: The Author. ISBN 978-0-90-615810-4 – via Archive Foundation.
- Moran, Heather (2007), "The Canadian Army Medical Corps at Vimy Ridge", in Hayes, Geoffrey; Iarocci, Andrew; Bechthold, Mike (eds.), Vimy Ridge: A Canadian Reassessment, Waterloo: Wilfrid Laurier University Press, pp. 139–154, ISBN 978-0-88920-508-6
- Nicholson, G. W. L. (1962), Canadian Expeditionary Force 1914–1919 (PDF), Official History of the Canadian Army in the First World War, Ottawa: Queen's Printer and Controller of Stationery, OCLC 59609928, archived from the original (PDF) on 26 August 2011
- Nicholson, Gerald (2018) [1962]. Canadian Expeditionary Force 1914–1919. Official History of the Canadian Army in the First World War (facs. repr. Naval & Military Press, Uckfield ed.). Ottawa: Queen's Printer and Controller of Stationery. ISBN 978-1-78-331411-9.
- Pierce, John (1992), "Constructing Memory: The Vimy Memorial" (PDF), Canadian Military History, I (1–2), Laurier Centre for Military Strategic and Disarmament Studies: 4–14, ISSN 1195-8472, archived from the original (PDF) on 5 March 2009
- Rawling, Bill (2007), "The Sappers of Vimy: Specialized Support for the Assault of 9 April 1917", in Hayes, Geoffrey; Iarocci, Andrew; Bechthold, Mike (eds.), Vimy Ridge: A Canadian Reassessment, Waterloo: Wilfrid Laurier University Press, pp. 125–138, ISBN 978-0-88920-508-6
- Robbins, Simon (2010). British Generalship during the Great War: The Military Career of Sir Henry Horne (1861–1929). Ashgate. ISBN 978-0-7546-6127-6.
- Robinson, Phillip; Cave, Nigel (2011). The Underground War: Vimy Ridge to Arras. Vol. I. Barnsley: Pen & Sword. ISBN 978-1-84415-976-5.
- Samuels, Martin (1996), Command or Control? Command Training and Tactics in the British and German Armies, 1888–1918, Portland: Frank Cass, ISBN 978-0-7146-4570-4
- Sheffield, Gary (2002), Forgotten Victory: The First World War Myths and Realities, London: Headline Books, ISBN 978-0-7472-6460-6
- Sheldon, Jack (2008), The German Army on Vimy Ridge 1914–1917, Barnsley: Pen & Sword Military, ISBN 978-1-84415-680-1
- Terraine, John (1992), The Smoke and the Fire: Myths and Anti-Myths of War 1861–1945, London: Pen & Sword Books, ISBN 978-0-85052-330-0
- Tucker, Spencer, ed. (1996), The European Powers in the First World War: An Encyclopedia, New York: Garland, ISBN 978-0-8153-0399-2
- Turner, Alexander (2005), Vimy Ridge 1917: Byng's Canadians Triumph at Arras, London: Osprey, ISBN 978-1-84176-871-7
- Vance, Jonathan Franklin (1997), Death So Noble: Memory, Meaning and the First World War, Vancouver: UBC Press, ISBN 978-0-7748-0600-8
- Vimy Memorial, Ottawa, Ontario: Canadian War Museum, 2009, archived from the original on 3 April 2012
- Williams, Jeffery (1983), Byng of Vimy, General and Governor General, London: Secker & Warburg, ISBN 978-0-436-57110-7 – via Archive Foundation
- Winegard, Timothy (2007), "Here at Vimy: A Retrospective: The 90th Anniversary of the Battle of Vimy Ridge" (PDF), Canadian Military Journal, VIII (2), Department of National Defence: 83–85, ISSN 1492-465X, archived (PDF) from the original on 5 March 2009
- Wynne, Graeme Chamley (1976) [1940], If Germany Attacks: The Battle in Depth in the West (Greenwood Press, NY ed.), London: Faber & Faber, ISBN 978-0-8371-5029-1
