= Tanhai =

Tanhai (lit. 'loneliness') may refer to:

- Tanhai (film), 1972 Indian drama film by Jagdish Nirula, starring Anil Dhawan and Rehana Sultan
- Tanhai (TV series), 2013 Pakistani television serial
- ''Tanhaai'', a 2020 single by Tulsi Kumar and Sachet–Parampara

== See also ==
- Tanha (disambiguation)
- "Tanhayee", a song by Sonu Nigam from the 2001 Indian film Dil Chahta Hai
- Tanhaiyan, a 2017 Indian TV series on Hotstar
