= Thane (name) =

Thane is a masculine given name and a surname. It may refer to:

== Surname ==
- Thane (surname)

== Given name ==
- Thane Baker (born 1931), American former sprinter
- Thane Bettany (1929–2015), English actor
- Thane Campbell (1895–1978), Canadian politician and jurist, 19th premier of Prince Edward Island
- Thane Camus (born 1970), French-American screen actor
- Thane Gash (born 1965), American former National Football League player
- Thane Gustafson (born 1944), political scientist
- Thane Houser (1891–1967), American race car driver
- Thane Maynard, American zookeeper
- Thane K. Pratt (born 1950), American wildlife biologist
- Thane Rosenbaum (born 1960), American novelist, essayist and law professor

== Fictional characters ==
- Thane (comics), a Marvel Comics character
- Thane Krios, a character in the video game Mass Effect 2 Thane Whitefield
