= John George Pattison =

Canadian soldier and recipient of the Victoria Cross

John George Pattison VC
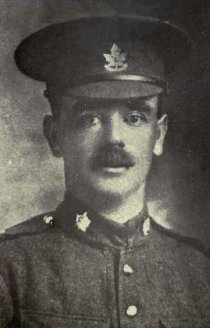
- Born: 8 September 1875; Woolwich, London
- Died: 3 June 1917 (aged 41); Vimy Ridge, near Lens, France
- Burial place: La Chaudière Military Cemetery, Vimy
- Military career
- Allegiance: Canada
- Branch: Canadian Expeditionary Force
- Service years: 1916 - 1917
- Rank: Private
- Unit: 50th Battalion, CEF
- Conflicts: World War I: Western Front; Nivelle Offensive; Battle of Arras; Battle of Vimy Ridge †
- Awards: Victoria Cross

John George Pattison VC (8 September 1875 – 3 June 1917) was a Canadian soldier. Pattison was a recipient of the Victoria Cross, the highest and most prestigious award for valour in the face of the enemy that can be Awarded to British and Commonwealth forces.

Pattison was born in London, England and emigrated to Canada. He and his family (wife and four children) settled in Calgary where he found a job with the Calgary Gas Company. He was killed in fighting during the Battle of Vimy Ridge the same year he won the VC.

== Details ==
Pattison enlisted at Calgary, Alberta on 6 March 1916. A son had already enlisted and Pattison enlisted, at the age of 40, so that he would be able to protect his son, the story goes. As the war unfolded, he was sent to France while his son stayed in England.

One of four soldiers to earn the Victoria Cross at the Battle of Vimy Ridge, (the others were Thain Wendell MacDowell, Ellis Wellwood Sifton and William Johnstone Milne), Pattison was 41 years old, and a private in the 50th (Calgary) Battalion, Canadian Expeditionary Force, during the First World War when the following deed took place for which he was awarded the VC.

On 10 April 1917 at the Battle of Vimy Ridge, in the area of Hill 145 (the location of today's Memorial), when the advance of Canadian troops was held up by an enemy machine-gun that was inflicting severe casualties, Private Pattison, with utter disregard of his own safety, sprang forward and jumping from shell-hole to shell-hole, reached cover within thirty yards of the enemy gun. From this point, in the face of heavy fire he hurled bombs killing and wounding some of the crew, and then rushed forward overcoming and bayoneting the surviving five gunners. His initiative and valour undoubtedly saved the situation.

He was killed in action at Lens, France, on 3 June 1917. He is buried at La Chaudière Military Cemetery, France located 7 miles north of Arras (plot IV, row C, grave 14).

A mountain in the Victoria Cross Ranges in Jasper National Park, Alberta is named in his honour. The City of Calgary named a bridge over the Elbow River to recognize Pte. Pattison.

== Victoria Cross ==
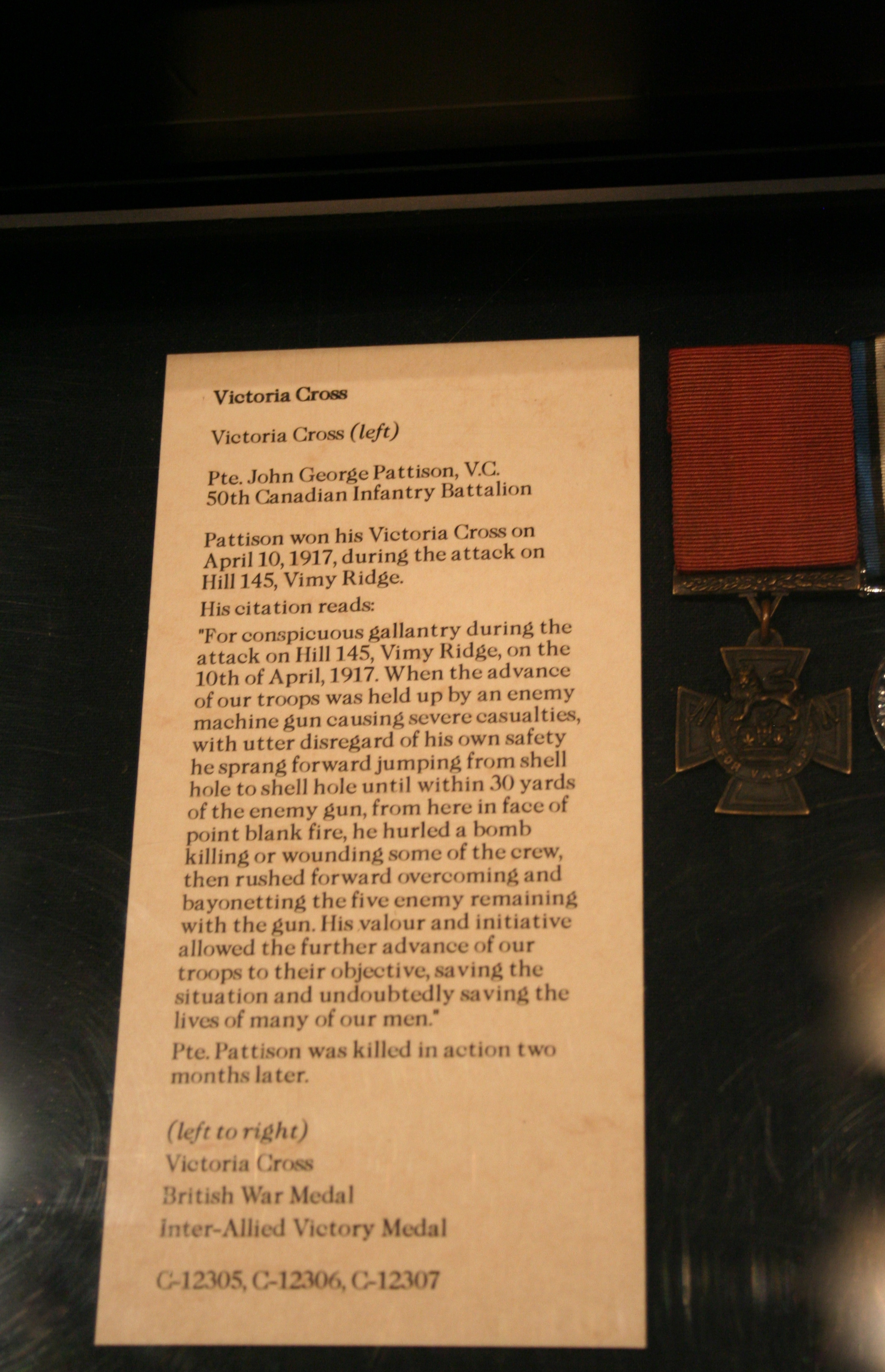
George Pattison Victoria Cross Medal at the Glenbow Museum in Calgary.

His Victoria Cross is displayed at the Glenbow Museum in Calgary, Alberta.

A memorial stone is laid in Greenwich, London. The Royal British Legion donated these Stones to any Borough that had a recipient of the Victoria Cross born there. This was the second such stone for George Pattison as the original had a missing bar on the letter E in 'ALBERTA'.
