= Tanha =

Tanha, Thanha or Thanhha may refer to

== Culture and media ==
- Taṇhā, "thirst," a concept in Buddhism referring to craving or desire
- Tanha (TV series), an Indian television drama which aired in 1997–1999

== People ==
- Thanhha Lai (born 1965), Vietnam-born American writer
- Abbas Saeidi Tanha (born 1981), Iranian cyclist

== Villages in Iran ==
- Tanha Kola, Amol
- Tanha Kola, Babol

== See also ==
- Tana (disambiguation)
- Tanhai (disambiguation)
- Tanaji, an Indian name
