= 18th Battalion (Western Ontario), CEF =

- Active: 7 November 1914 - 15 September 1920
- Country: Canada
- Branch: Canadian Expeditionary Force
- Role: Infantry
- Size: Battalion
- Engagements: First World War

The 18th Battalion (Western Ontario), CEF, was an infantry battalion of the Canadian Expeditionary Force in the Great War.

== History ==
The battalion was authorized on 7 November 1914 and embarked for Great Britain on 18 April 1915. It disembarked in France on 15 September 1915, where it fought as part of the 4th Canadian Infantry Brigade, 2nd Canadian Division in France and Flanders until the end of the war. The battalion was disbanded on 15 September 1920.

The 18th Battalion recruited and was mobilized in London, Ontario.

The 18th Battalion had five Officers Commanding:

- Lt.-Col. R.G.E Leckie, 1914 – 18 April 1915
- Lt.-Col. E.W.S. Wigle, 18 April 1915 – 8 July 1916
- Lt.-Col. H.L. Milligan, DSO, 8 July 1916 – 9 October 1916
- Lt.-Col. G.F. Morrison, DSO, 9 October 1916 – 19 April 1917
- Lt.-Col. L.E. Jones, CMG, DSO, 19 April 1917 -Demobilization

== Victoria Cross ==
One member of the 18th Battalion, Lance-Sergeant Ellis Wellwood Sifton was posthumously awarded the Victoria Cross for his actions on 9 April 1917 during the assault on Vimy Ridge.

== Perpetuations ==
The 18th Battalion (Western Ontario), CEF, is perpetuated by The Essex and Kent Scottish

== Battle honours ==
The 18th Battalion was awarded the following battle honours:

- MOUNT SORREL
- SOMME, 1916, '18
- Flers-Courcelette
- Thiepval
- Ancre Heights
- ARRAS, 1917, '18
- Vimy, 1917
- HILL 70
- Ypres 1917
- Passchendaele
- AMIENS
- Scarpe, 1918
- HINDENBURG LINE
- Canal du Nord
- Cambrai, 1918
- PURSUIT TO MONS
- FRANCE AND FLANDERS, 1915-18

== See also ==
- List of infantry battalions in the Canadian Expeditionary Force

== Sources ==
Canadian Expeditionary Force 1914-1919 by Col. G.W.L. Nicholson, CD, Queen's Printer, Ottawa, Ontario, 1962
