= Thane (surname) =

Thane is a surname. Notable people with the surname include:

- Amanda Thane (1953–2012), Australian operatic soprano
- Bartlett L. Thane (1877–1927), American mining engineer, namesake of the Juneau neighborhood
- Elswyth Thane (1900–1984), American romance novelist
- Henry Thane (1850–1938), American businessman and bank owner from Arkansas
- John Thane (dealer), (1747–1818), English art dealer, working also as an engraver and printseller
- John Thane (priest) (died 1727), English churchman
- Lucy Thane (born 1967), British documentary filmmaker, event producer and performer
- Mark Thane, American politician from Montana
- Pat Thane (fl. 1998–present), British historian
- Russell T. Thane (1926–2020), American politician from North Dakota
