= Thein Thein Htay =

Thein Thein Htay is a doctor and former deputy minister of health of the government of Myanmar.

== Early life ==
Htay received her medical degree from the University of Medicine 2, Yangon in 1977. She did a master's degree in Public Health in 1987 from the University of Medicine 1, Yangon.

== Career ==
Htay was one of the founders of Family planning in Myanmar.

From 1999 to 2004, Htay worked at the headquarters of the World Health Organization. She is a board member of International Centre for Diarrhoeal Disease Research, Bangladesh.
