= Thain Wendell MacDowell =

Canadian soldier

Thain Wendell MacDowell VC DSO
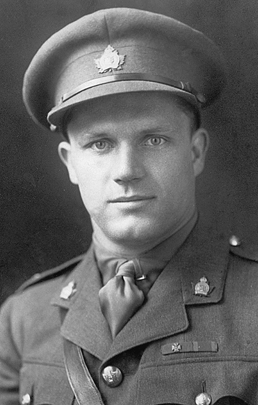
- MacDowell, c. 1919
- Born: September 16, 1890; Lachute, Quebec, Canada
- Died: March 28, 1960 (aged 69); Nassau, The Bahamas
- Burial place: Oakland Cemetery, Brockville
- Military career
- Allegiance: Canada
- Branch: Canadian Militia; Canadian Expeditionary Force
- Service years: 1914 - 1927
- Rank: Lieutenant Colonel
- Units: 41st Regiment Brockville Rifles; 2nd Regiment Queen's Own Rifles of Canada; 38th Battalion, CEF
- Commands: The Frontenac Regiment
- Conflicts: First World War: Western Front; Battle of the Somme; Nivelle Offensive; Battle of Arras; Battle of Vimy Ridge (WIA)
- Awards: Victoria Cross; Distinguished Service Order

Thain Wendell MacDowell, VC, DSO (September 16, 1890 – March 28, 1960), was a Canadian soldier. MacDowell was a recipient of the Victoria Cross, the highest and most prestigious award for gallantry in the face of the enemy that can be awarded to British and Commonwealth forces.

== Overview ==
Thain Wendell MacDowell was born in Lachute, Quebec on 16 September 1890. His early days were spent in the Brockville, Ontario area, where he was educated at Brockville Collegiate Institute and joined the 41st Regiment Brockville Rifles. He later attended the University of Toronto, where he joined the Canadian Officer Training Corps as an Officer Cadet of The Queen's Own Rifles of Canada for four months. After graduating with a Bachelor of Arts in 1914, he enlisted and was commissioned in the 38th (Ottawa) Canadian Infantry Battalion (now perpetuated as The Cameron Highlanders of Ottawa (Duke of Edinburgh's Own)).

During service in France in 1916, he was awarded the Distinguished Service Order on the Somme, and the following year, promoted to Major, he was conferred the Victoria Cross for gallantry at Vimy Ridge on 9 April.

=== Victoria Cross ===
One of four soldiers to earn the Victoria Cross in the Battle of Vimy Ridge, one of two to survive the battle and the only one to survive the war, (the others were Ellis Wellwood Sifton, William Johnstone Milne and John George Pattison), MacDowell was 26 years old, and a captain in the 38th (Ottawa) Battalion, Canadian Expeditionary Force during the First World War when he was awarded the Victoria Cross.

On 9 April 1917 at Vimy Ridge, France, Captain MacDowell, with the assistance of two runners (company orderlies, Pvts. James T. Kobus and Arthur James Hay, both of whom were awarded the DCM for their part) reached the German position ahead of his company. After destroying one machine-gun nest he chased the crew from another. MacDowell then spotted one German going into a tunnel. At the base of the tunnel, MacDowell was able to bluff the Germans to think he was part of a much larger force, resulting in the surrendering of two German officers and 75 German soldiers. He sent the prisoners up out the tunnel in groups of 12 so that Kobus and Hay could take them back to the Canadian line. Seeing that he had been fooled, a German prisoner grabbed a rifle and tried to shoot one of the runners. The German was then shot and killed.

Although wounded in the hand, MacDowell continued for five days to hold the position gained, in spite of heavy shellfire, until eventually relieved by his battalion. He was promoted to the rank of Major following his actions at Vimy Ridge.

== Later life ==
He later achieved the rank of Lieutenant-Colonel of the Frontenac Regiment from Napanee, Ontario. After the war, Colonel MacDowell served as an executive of several mining and chemical companies, and from 1923 to 1928, he acted as private secretary to the Minister of National Defence. He was placed on the retired list as a Lieutenant-Colonel.

In July 1929, he married Norah Jean Hodgson, of Montreal. They first lived in Toronto, but moved to Montreal in 1931. He had two sons, Thain W., who died in 2015, and Angus J., who died in 2018. His wife (Norah Jean MacDowell) died on 1 November 1983. He also had three grand children: A. Stuart, Patricia E, And Kenneth R.

He died in Nassau, the Bahamas, on 28 March 1960. Colonel MacDowell is buried at Oakland Cemetery (R.R.3, Brockville, Ontario, Canada. Anglican Section 3. Lot 112), in the Richardson family plot. The grave is marked by a headstone.

== Legacy ==
The Director of National Defence erected a memorial range at the Connaught Ranges and Primary Training Centre in Ottawa, Ontario which was named in honour of LCol Thain Wendell MacDowell VC, DSO (1890-1960).

Colonel MacDowell's Victoria Cross is on display at the University of Toronto, Toronto, Ontario. There is a plaque in his honour on corner of Highway 2 and Church Street in Maitland, Ontario.
