= Thegn =

Medieval British and Scandinavian noble title

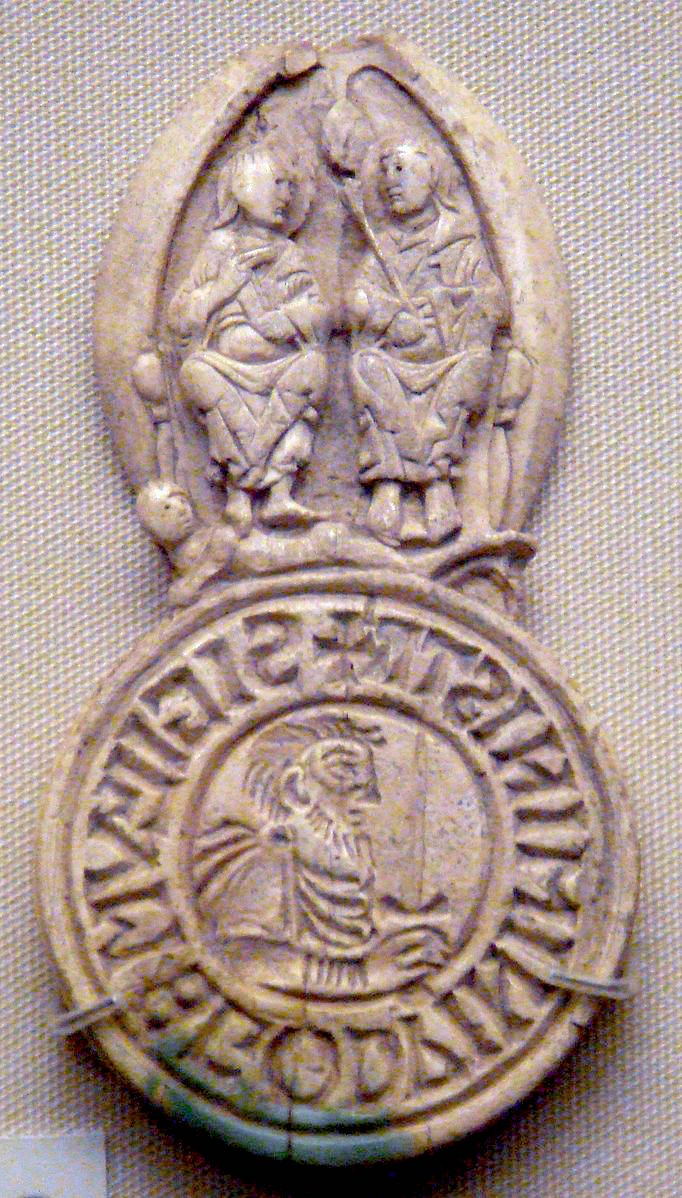
Ivory seal of Godwin, an unknown thegn – first half of eleventh century, British Museum

In later Anglo-Saxon England, a thegn, or thane (/θeɪn/; Latin: minister), was an aristocrat who ranked at the third level in lay society, below the king and the ealdormen. He had to be a substantial landowner. Thanage refers to the tenure by which lands were held by a thane as well as the rank; an approximately equivalent modern title may be that of baron.

The term thane was also used in early medieval Scandinavia for a class of retainers, and thane was a title given to local royal officials in medieval eastern Scotland, equivalent in rank to the child of an earl.

== Etymology ==
Thegn is only used once in the laws before the reign of King Æthelstan (924–939), but more frequently in charters. Apparently unconnected to the German and Dutch word dienen ('to serve'), H. M. Chadwick suggests "the sense of subordination must have been inherent... from the earliest time". It gradually expanded in meaning and use, to denote a member of a territorial nobility, while thegnhood was attainable by fulfilling certain conditions.

An Anglo-Saxon Dictionary describes a thane as "one engaged in a king's or a queen's service, whether in the household or in the country". It adds: "the word... seems gradually to acquire a technical meaning... denoting a class, containing several degrees".

== Origins ==
The word gesith/gesiþ (plural gesithum/gesiðum), the precursor of thegn, used in the Old English epic poem Beowulf

In the 5th century, Germanic peoples collectively known as Anglo-Saxons migrated to sub-Roman Britain and came to dominate the east and southeast of the island. Based on archaeological evidence (such as burials and buildings), these early communities appear to have lacked any social elite. Around half the population were free, independent farmers (Old English: ceorlas) who cultivated a hide of land (enough to provide for a family). Slaves, mostly native Britons, made up the other half.

By the late 6th century, the archeological evidence (grander burials and buildings) suggests the development of a social elite. This period coincided with the Late Antique Little Ice Age and the Plague of Justinian. These events would have caused famine and other societal disruptions that may have increased violence and led previously independent farmers to submit to the rule of strong lords. The Old English word for lord is hlaford ('loaf-guardian' or 'bread-giver').

The early law codes of Kent use the Old English word eorl ('high born', 'noble') to describe a nobleman. By the 8th century, the word gesith ('companion'; Latin: comes) had replaced eorl as the common term for a nobleman. There were both land-owning and landless gesiths. A landless gesith would serve as a retainer in the comitatus of a king, queen, or lord. In return, they were provided protection (Old English: mund) and gifts of gold and silver. Young nobles were raised with the children of kings to someday become their gesith. A gesith might be granted an estate in reward for loyal service.

By the 10th century, Anglo-Saxon society was divided into three main social classes: slaves, ceorlas ('free men'), and þegnas ('thegns', 'aristocrats'). Thegn (Old English: þeġn) meant servant or warrior, and it replaced the term gesith. Law codes assigned a weregeld or man price of 200 shillings for a ceorl and 1,200s for a thegn.

== Ranks and functions ==
There were different ranks within the thegnhood. The lowest thegnly rank was the median thegn who owed service to other thegns. King's thegns ranked higher because they only served the king. The king promoted the most favoured or important thegns to the office of ealdorman (later earl). The higher a thegn's rank, the greater heriot he paid to the king.

Thegns were the backbone of local government and the military. Sheriffs were drawn from this class, and thegns were required to attend the shire court and give judgment. For these reasons, the historian David Carpenter described thegns as "the country gentry of Anglo-Saxon England".

Although their exact role is unclear, the twelve senior thegns of the hundred played a part in the development of the English system of justice. Under a law of Æthelred the Unready they "seem to have acted as the judicial committee of the court for the purposes of accusation". This suggests some connection with the modern jury trial.

== Social mobility ==
Children inherited thegnly status from their father, and a thegnly woman who married a ceorl retained her noble status. A successful thegn might hope to be promoted to earl.

A prosperous ceorl could become a landlord in his own right and aspire to thegnly rank. In the legal tract Geþyncðo, Archbishop Wulfstan of York (1002–1023) detailed the criteria for attaining thegnhood: "And if a ceorl prospered, that he possessed fully five hides of his own, a belhus and a burhgeat [a defensible manor house], a seat and special office in the king’s hall, then was he henceforth entitled to the rights of a thegn." The legal text Norðleoda laga ('law of the Northern People') also included the five-hide qualification but added that the land had to be kept for three generations.

Thegnhood was also attainable to the merchant who "fared thrice over the wide sea by his own means."

== Households ==
A noble household included a number of retainers, termed cniht ('young man', 'retainer'; from which the modern word knight derives) or huscarl ('housecarl', 'man of the household'). Thegnly wills can be used to reconstruct noble households. Thurstan Lustwine's will, written c. 1043, left land to his cnihtes and his two chaplains (who in addition to religious duties would also have performed secretarial work). The will of a noblewoman named Leofgifu left land to her three stewards, two reeves, a chaplain, and her cnihtes. Another household officer identified in wills is that of huntsman (hunta).

Just as king's thegns served in the royal household, lesser thegns served as the seneschals, chamberlains, and stewards of king's thegns and ealdormen. These were considered honourable posts rather than servile positions. Vagn, the leader of Earl Leofric's housecarls, owned 54 hides of land with his main manor at Wootton Wawen ('Vagn's Wootton'). High ranking men such as Vagn would have formed the inner circle of the lord's household.

== Post-conquest England ==
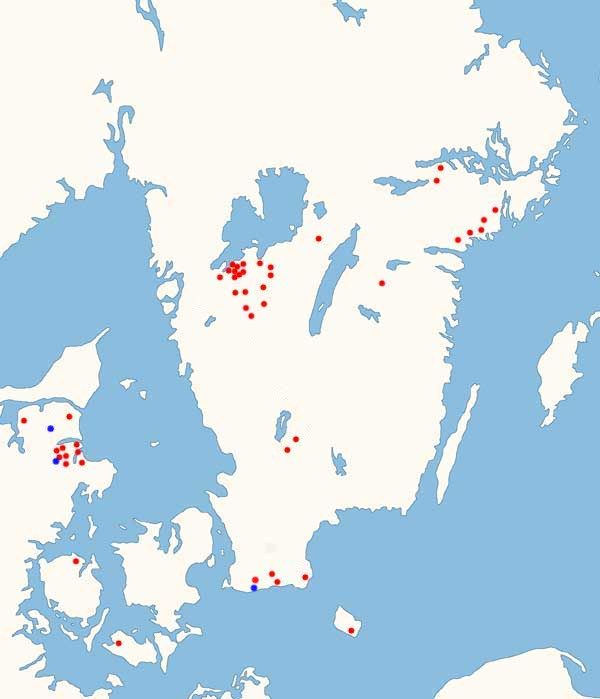
Scandinavian runestones of thegns are marked in red, those using the junior position "drengr" in blue.

In 1066, there were an estimated 5,000 thegns in England. After the Norman conquest of England in 1066, William the Conqueror replaced the Anglo-Saxon aristocracy with Normans, who replaced the previous terminology with their own names for such social ranks. Those previously known as thegns became part of the knightly class.

== Runestones ==
During the later part of the tenth and in the eleventh centuries in Denmark and Sweden, it became common for families or comrades to raise memorial runestones. Approximately fifty of these note that the deceased was a thegn. Examples of such runestones include Sö 170 at Nälberga, Vg 59 at Norra Härene, Vg 150 at Velanda, DR 143 at Gunderup, DR 209 at Glavendrup, and DR 277 at Rydsgård.

== See also ==
- Abthain
- Fyrd
- Thain
- Thane (Scotland)
- Trinoda necessitas
