= Thein Tun Oo =

Burmese politician

- သိန်းထွန်းဦး

Member of the Pyithu Hluttaw
- In office 31 January 2011 – 29 January 2016
- Preceded by: Position established
- Succeeded by: Soe Myint @Aung Zaw Myint
- Constituency: Amarapura Township

Personal details
- Born: 16 August 1966 (age 59) Amarapura, Burma
- Party: Union Solidarity and Development Party
- Occupation: Politician

Thein Tun Oo (Burmese: သိန်းထွန်းဦး, also spelt Thein Htun Oo; born 16 August 1966) is a Burmese politician who served as member of parliament in the Pyithu Hluttaw for Amarapura Township from 2011 to 2016. In the 2010 Myanmar general election, he contested the Amarapura Township constituency for a seat in the Pyithu Hluttaw MP, the country's lower house. He is a spokesman and Central committee member of the Union Solidarity and Development Party.
