= Thélus =

- Commune
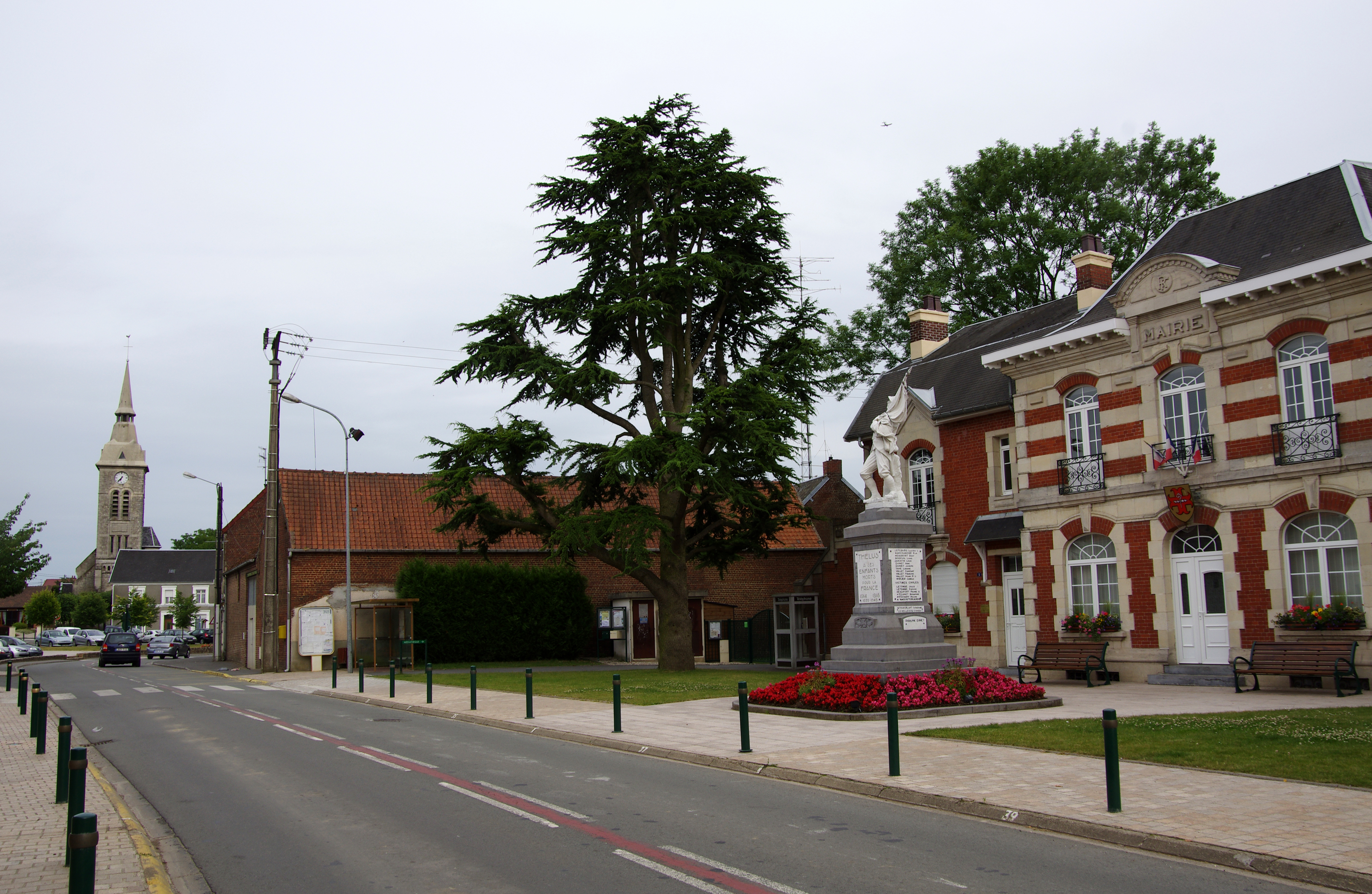
- The centre of Thélus

- Coat of arms
- Location of Thélus
- Location within France Location within Hauts-de-France
- Coordinates: 50°21′20″N 2°48′05″E
- Country: France
- Region: Hauts-de-France
- Department: Pas-de-Calais
- Arrondissement: Arras
- Canton: Arras-2
- Intercommunality: Arras

Government
  - Mayor (2020–2026): Bernard Milleville
- Area^{1}: 8.99 km^{2} (3.47 sq mi)
- Elevation: 121 m (397 ft)
- Highest elevation: 143 m (469 ft)
- Lowest elevation: 88 m (289 ft)
- Population (2023): 1,310
  - Density: 146/km^{2} (377/sq mi)
- Time zone: UTC+01:00 (CET)
  - Summer (DST): UTC+02:00 (CEST)
- INSEE/Postal code: 62810 /62580
- ^{1} French Land Register data, which excludes lakes, ponds, glaciers > 1 km^{2} (0.386 sq mi or 247 acres) and river estuaries.

Thélus (French pronunciation: [tely]) is a commune in the Pas-de-Calais department in the Hauts-de-France region of France. It is located eight kilometres (5.0 mi) north of Arras and four kilometres (2.5 mi) southeast of the Canadian National Vimy Memorial dedicated to the Battle of Vimy Ridge and the missing First World War Canadian soldiers with no known grave; the Memorial is also the site of two Canadian cemeteries.

During the First World War, Thélus and Arras lay in the zone rouge (officially declared as "completely devastated").

== See also ==
- Communes of the Pas-de-Calais department
