= David Watson (general) =

Canadian journalist, newspaper owner, and general

Sir David Watson
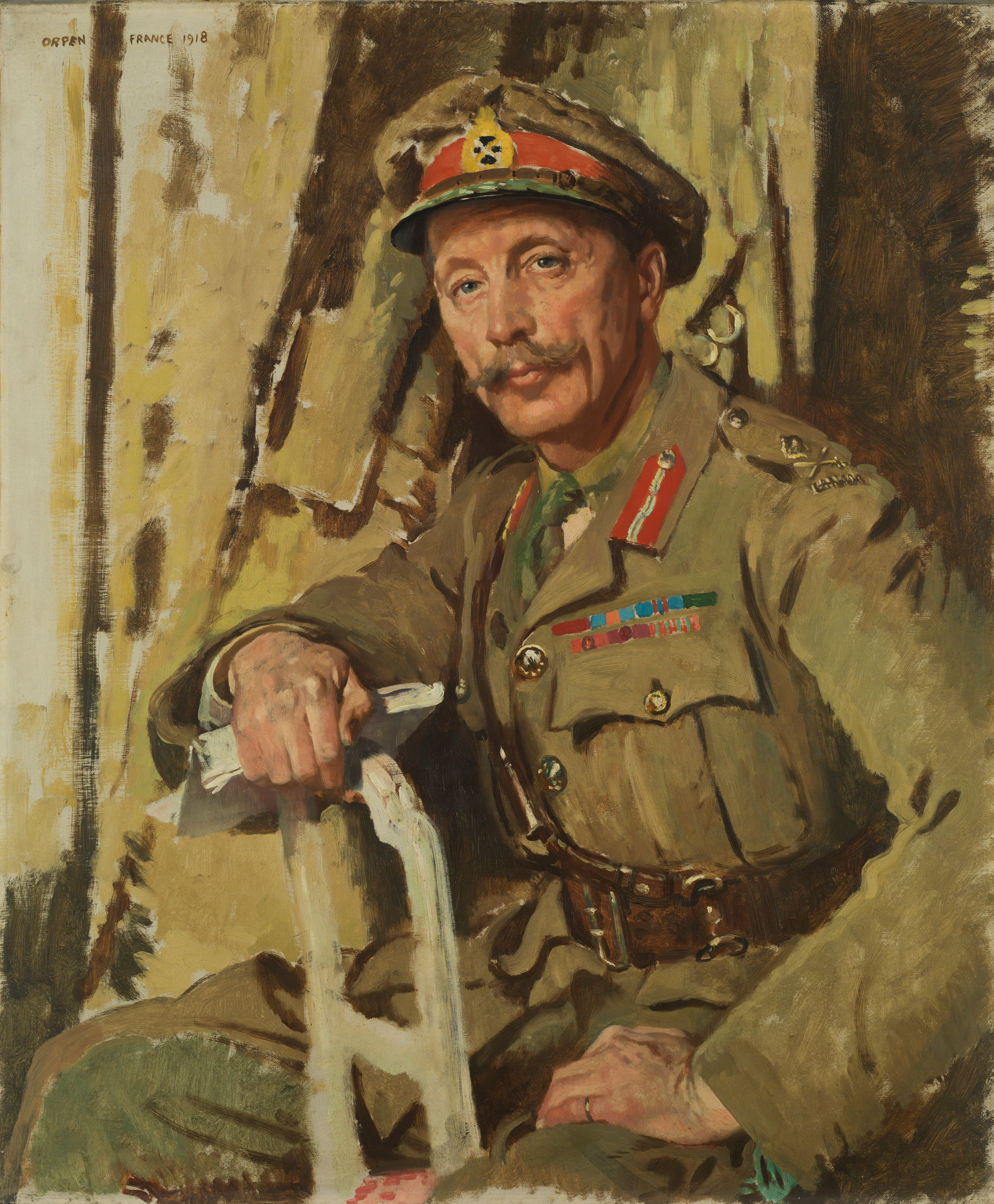
- Major-General Sir David Watson (portrait by Irish war artist William Orpen, 1917–18)
- Born: 7 February 1869; Quebec City, Quebec
- Died: February 19, 1922 (aged 53); Quebec City, Quebec
- Military career
- Branch: Canadian Corps
- Rank: Major-General
- Commands: 2nd Battalion, CEF; 5th Brigade, 2nd Canadian Division; 4th Canadian Division
- Conflicts: World War I: Second Battle of Ypres; Battle of Vimy Ridge; Battle of Passchendaele; Battle of Amiens; Second Battle of Arras; Battle of Cambrai
- Awards: Knight Commander of the Order of the Bath; Companion of the Order of St Michael and St George

Major-General Sir David Watson, KCB CMG (7 February 1869 – 19 February 1922) was a Canadian journalist, newspaper owner, and general.

== Biography ==
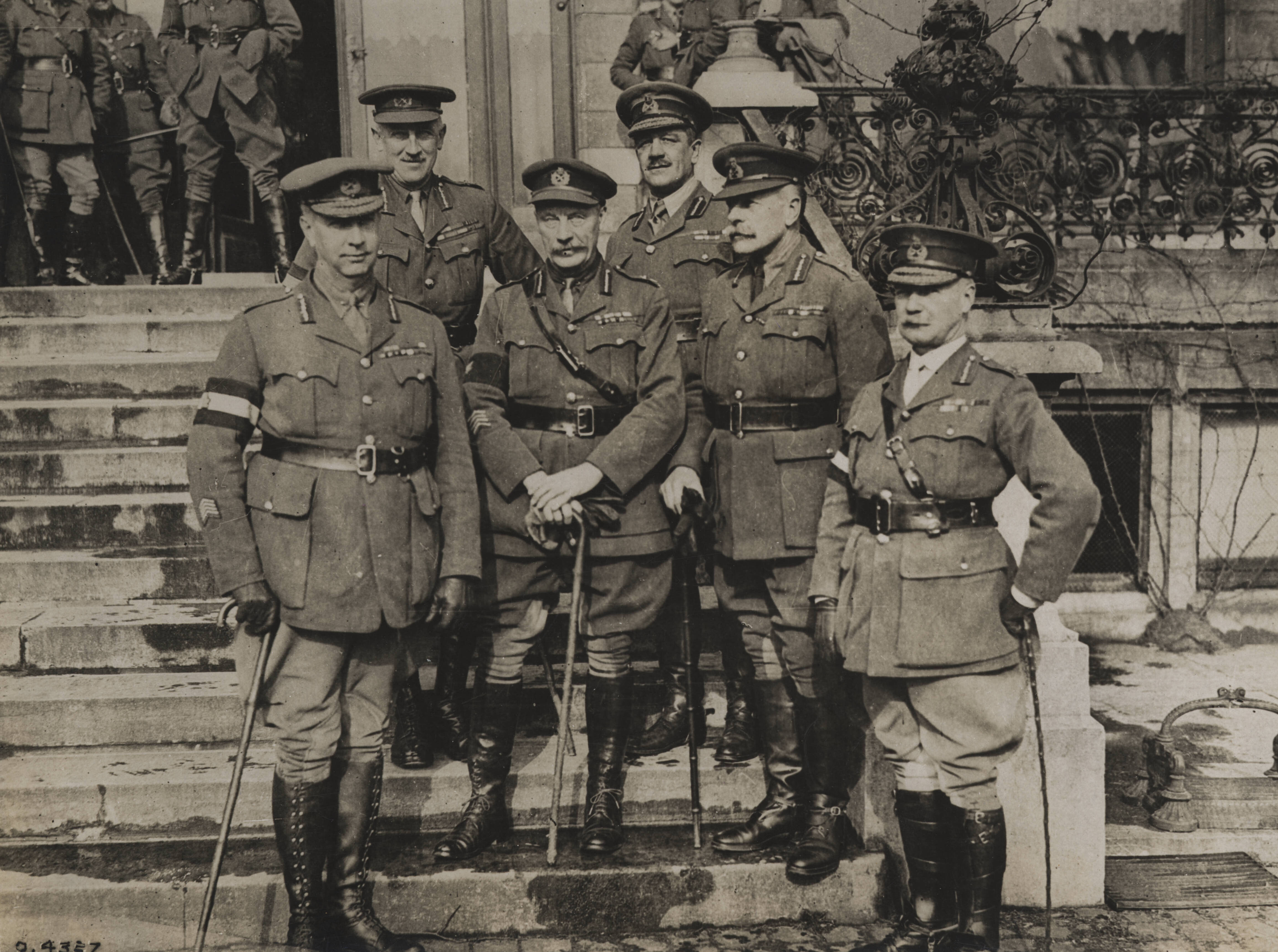
Field Marshal Sir Douglas Haig (2nd from right) with senior Canadian generals including Lieutenant General Arthur Currie (left), and Major General David Watson (centre), Bonn, Germany, December 1918

Born in Quebec City, Quebec, the son of William Watson and Jane Grant, Watson was a journalist with the Quebec Morning Chronicle (later called just Quebec Chronicle). He later became general manager of the paper and general manager of its publisher.

He started his military career as a private in the 8th Regiment, Royal Rifles. He was promoted to lieutenant and then to captain in 1903, major in 1910, and lieutenant-colonel in 1912. In 1914, he enlisted in the Canadian Expeditionary Force and was soon given command of the 2nd Battalion, CEF. He was promoted to brigadier-general in 1915 and took command of the 5th Brigade, 2nd Canadian Division. He was promoted to major-general in April 1916 and took command of the 4th Canadian Division upon its creation in 1916. Aided by Edmund Ironside, he led his various commands in most of the major Canadian battles of World War I, including Second Ypres, the Somme, Vimy Ridge, Passchendaele, Amiens, Second Arras, and Cambrai.

In late 1917, he and Victor Odlum saved their commanding officer, Arthur Currie, from a career-ending charge of embezzlement by ‘lending’ Currie enough money so that he could repay a very large sum he had stolen from regimental funds before the war.

After the war, he resumed his job at the Quebec Chronicle and became the majority owner. He was also chairman of the Quebec Harbour Commission. He died in 1922.

== Honours ==
- Croix de guerre – France
- Croix de guerre – Belgium
- C.M.G., 1917.
- C.B., 1916.
- K.C.B., 1918.

== Bibliography ==
- "David Watson". Dictionary of Canadian Biography (online ed.). University of Toronto Press. 1979–2016.
- Jackson, Geoffrey (2021). The War Diaries of General David Watson. Wilfrid Laurier University Press. ISBN 978-1771125062.
