= John Hamilton Roberts =

Canadian army general

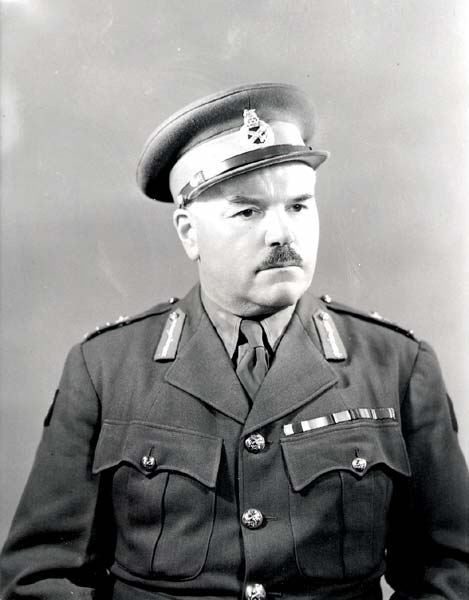
- John Hamilton Roberts
- Born: December 21, 1891; Pipestone, Manitoba, Canada
- Died: December 17, 1962 (aged 70); Jersey, Channel Islands, United Kingdom
- Military career
- Allegiance: Canada
- Branch: Canadian Expeditionary Force; Canadian Militia; Canadian Army
- Service years: 1914–1945
- Rank: Major General
- Nickname: "Ham"
- Commands: 1st Field Regiment, Royal Canadian Artillery; 1st Canadian Infantry Brigade2nd Canadian Infantry Division
- Conflicts: World War I World War II: Dieppe Raid
- Awards: Companion of the Order of the Bath; Distinguished Service Order; Military Cross

Major General John Hamilton "Ham" Roberts CB DSO MC (December 21, 1891 – December 17, 1962) was a Canadian Army officer who served in both of the world wars.

== Biography ==
Roberts was born in Pipestone, Manitoba. He studied in Upper Canada College and graduated from the Royal Military College of Canada in Kingston, Ontario, in 1914, student No. 891.

From 1939, he commanded the 1st Field Regiment, RCHA, in northern France, and was serving in that position when the Germans began the Battle of France in May 1940. Roberts managed to save his regiment's guns while evacuating from Brest in Brittany during the unsuccessful attempt to establish a second British Expeditionary Force in France after the evacuation at Dunkirk. He was later promoted to major-general and appointed General Officer Commanding the 2nd Canadian Division in 1941.

Roberts was put in charge of the ground troops for the raid against Dieppe, on August 19, 1942. His command post was aboard HMS Calpe, and due to poor communications he had no idea how his troops were managing, until they called for landing craft for immediate evacuation. Roberts was criticized for unnecessarily committing his reserve troops (Les Fusiliers Mont-Royal) and inadvertently increasing the casualties.

He was relieved of his command six months later. It was Roberts's inept performance during a war-game codenamed Operation Spartan in March 1943 rather than the Dieppe raid, which ended Roberts's career. Lieutenant General Harry Crerar, commanding I Canadian Corps (and under whose command Robert's 2nd Division fell), reprimanded Roberts for the poor co-ordination between the 2nd Division's artillery and infantry during Operation Spartan war-games, and that Roberts failed to have forces dig in after seizing a bridgehead despite having ample time to do so. After Operation Spartan, Roberts was judged unfit to hold a combat command. He was sent to command reinforcement units in the United Kingdom and received no further operational commands. He later retired to the Channel Islands where he died in 1962, at the age of 70.

== Notes ==
Military offices
Preceded by Victor Odlum	GOC 2nd Canadian Infantry Division; 1941–1943	Succeeded by Guy Simonds
