= Victor Odlum =

Canadian journalist, soldier, and diplomat

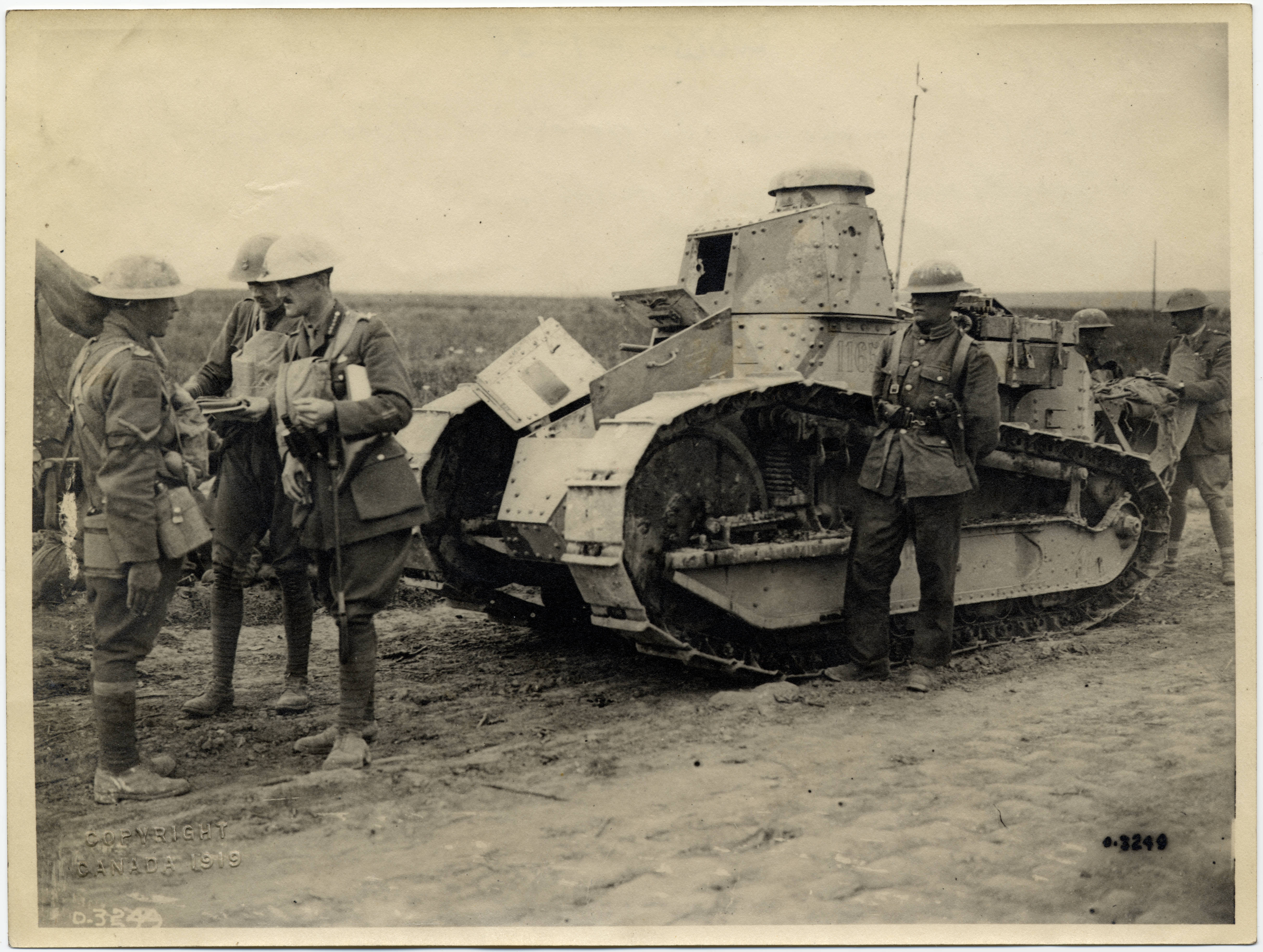
- Brigadier General Victor Odlum (third from the left) beside a Renault FT light tank, 1918.
- Born: 21 October 1880; Cobourg, Ontario
- Died: 4 April 1971 (aged 90); Vancouver, British Columbia
- Military career
- Allegiance: Canada
- Branch: Canadian Army
- Service years: 1900–1924; 1940–1941
- Rank: Major General
- Unit: The Royal Canadian Regiment
- Commands: 2nd Canadian Infantry Division
- Conflicts: Boer War; World War I World War II
- Awards: Companion of the Order of the Bath; Companion of the Order of St Michael and St George; Distinguished Service Order
- Other work: journalist, soldier, diplomat

Major General Victor Wentworth Odlum, CB, CMG, DSO (21 October 1880 – 4 April 1971) was a Canadian journalist, soldier, and diplomat. He was a prominent member of the business and political elite of Vancouver, British Columbia from the 1920s until his death in 1971. He was a newspaper publisher, a Liberal MLA from 1924 to 1928, co-founder of the Non-Partisan Association in 1937, temperance advocate, one of the first directors on the board of governors that oversaw the new Canadian Broadcasting Corporation, and a Canadian ambassador. He fought in the Second Boer War, World War I and World War II.

== Early life ==
Odlum was born in Cobourg, Ontario, the son of Edward Odlum (1850–1935), a historian and supporter of British Israelism. (A small street in Vancouver is named after the senior Odlum). When Victor was 6, his family moved to Japan for four years before moving to Vancouver, British Columbia in 1889.

At age 19, Odlum fought in the Boer War with The Royal Canadian Regiment; upon his return, he became a newspaperman, serving as a reporter and then editor-in-chief of the Daily World. By the time he was 25, he was editor of the Vancouver Daily World.

== First World War ==
With the outbreak of World War I in 1914, Odlum received a commission as major with the 7th Battalion (The British Columbia Regiment) of the First Canadian Division of the Canadian Expeditionary Force, second-in-command under Lieutenant-Colonel William Hart-McHarg.

=== Second Battle of Ypres ===
Odlum's battalion moved into the front lines in April 1915, and only days later was subjected to the first gas attacks on the Western Front that heralded the Second Battle of Ypres. Odlum showed great personal bravery during the battle. On a reconnaissance with Hart-McHarg, the two suddenly came under heavy small arms fire from a concealed group of Germans. They took cover in a shell-hole, Hart-McHarg seriously wounded. Realizing Hart-McHarg needed immediate medical attention, Odlum left the safety of the shell hole and zig-zagged up a hill under heavy fire in order to locate a medical officer. Despite Odlum's bravery, Hart-McHarg's wound proved fatal, and Odlum was subsequently promoted to command of the 7th Battalion, reporting to Brigadier-General Arthur Currie, commander of the 2nd Brigade. Odlum's battalion was almost immediately transferred to the 3rd Brigade under Brigadier-General Richard Turner and moved to the vicinity of St. Julien. The next day, the entire 3rd Brigade came under intense attack. After repulsing several attacks, Odlum's battalion desperately needed reinforcements and ammunition, but calls and messages to Turner's headquarters went unheeded. An ammunition party composed of Odlum's brother Joseph and several others attempted to resupply the front-line trenches; Odlum, from his command post, watched with shock as a shell landed in the midst of the party, killing his brother and several others. Odlum eventually was forced to withdraw his brigade before it was completely overwhelmed, but organized the withdrawal so well that his men suffered minimal losses.

He was later awarded the Distinguished Service Order, the citation for which reads:

For conspicuous ability and energy. He personally superintended all arrangements for a bombing attack made by his battalion on the night of 16th/17th November 1915, near Messines, and by his coolness and determination was largely instrumental in bringing about the success of the exploit.

=== Remainder of the war ===
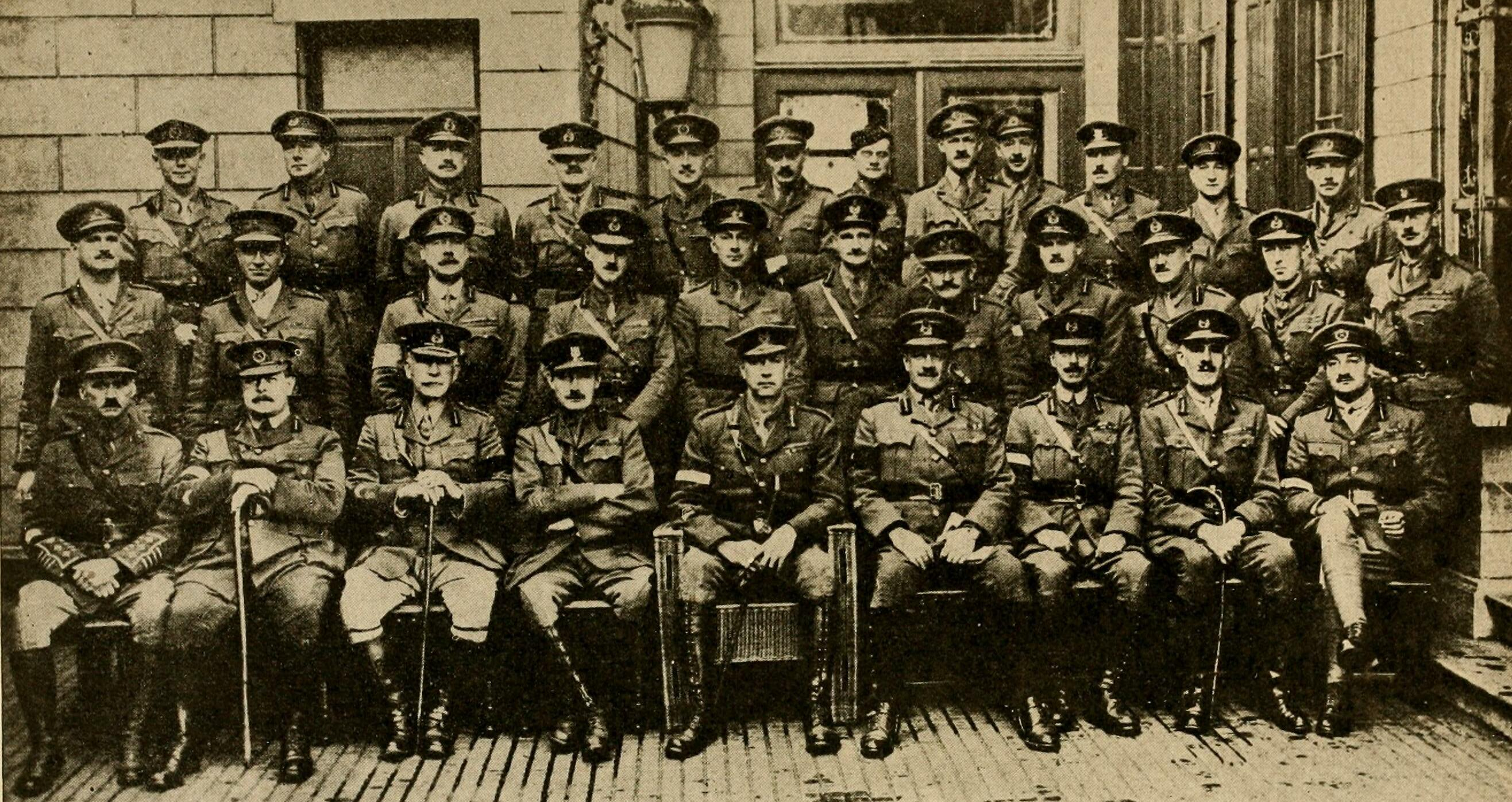
Lieutenant General Sir Arthur Currie with H. R. H. Prince Arthur of Connaught and other senior officers. Brigadier General Victor Odlum is stood in the second row, fourth from the left.

Odlum's abilities under fire were noted by General Arthur Currie, and Odlum was promoted regularly, eventually attaining the temporary rank of brigadier general on 10 July 1916 when assigned to command a brigade. He often was in the front lines with his men, personally led several attacks with pistol drawn, and was wounded three times during the war. Because he was a strict teetotaller, he insisted on non-alcoholic substitutes for his troops' traditional daily rum ration, earning him the derisive nicknames "Pea Soup Odlum" and "Old Lime Juice".

In 1917, Odlum and fellow officer David Watson helped their commanding officer Arthur Currie avoid charges of embezzlement by loaning Currie enough money to repay a very large sum he had stolen from regimental funds before the war.

== Prominent citizen of Vancouver ==
After the war Odlum returned to Vancouver, where he became a prominent financier, founding the investment firm Odlum Brown in 1923 with Colonel Albert "Buster" Brown. Odlum and fellow soldiers of his old 7th Battalion erected a memorial tablet in Christ Church, Vancouver, to perpetuate the memory of their original commanding officer, William Hart-McHarg, killed during the Second Battle of Ypres. Odlum also served as a member of the Provincial Legislature from 1924 to 1928. At the same time, he returned to the world of journalism, becoming the owner of the Vancouver Daily Star.

As with his rivals in the business at the time, Odlum used the paper to aggressively promote his views and advance his pet political causes, such as the temperance movement, as well as descending to sensationalist yellow journalism to boost circulation. In 1924, his paper stirred up anti-Chinese fervour by suggesting a Chinese houseboy employed by a posh Shaughnessy neighbourhood couple had murdered a Scottish nursemaid, Janet Smith, employed in the same household. Although the evidence instead suggested that the nursemaid had been accidentally killed by one of her employers during a domestic dispute, Odlum's paper suggested the Chinese houseboy, Wong Foon Sing, who had discovered the body, was the guilty party. Wong was subsequently kidnapped by vigilantes and tortured to elicit a confession; upon being freed, he was charged by police, but eventually released due to a total lack of evidence against him.

Odlum was a white supremacist who believed that Asian people could not assimilate with white people. After the murder of Janet Smith, he published an editorial called "Should Chinese Work with White Girls?" Odlum was also virulently anti-Bolshevik and anti-union, and shut down the Star rather than give in to his employees, who had unionized and refused to accept a pay cut. During the 1930s, he helped coordinate and train Special Constables hired to break a strike on Vancouver's waterfront.

After the Canadian Broadcasting Corporation was formed in 1936, Odlum served on its board of governors until the outbreak of World War II.

== Soldier turned diplomat ==
Although Odlum had left the Canadian Army in 1919 and had also resigned his commission in the militia in 1924, with the outbreak of World War II in 1939, he lobbied the government for a position in the expanding Canadian Army. Eventually, through the efforts of his friend Ian Mackenzie, who was in the federal cabinet of William Lyon Mackenzie King, Odlum was promoted over several Permanent Force officers, including Halfdan Hertzberg, to the rank of major general and command of the 2nd Canadian Infantry Division. However, instead of preparing his forces for modern warfare, Odlum devoted much time to "extraneous matters" such as regimental brass bands and arm patches. Field Marshal Sir Alan Brooke, the Chief of the Imperial General Staff (CIGS, the professional head of the British Army), thought him a "political general", and was prompted to write to General Andrew McNaughton that Odlum was "too old...too set...to adapt his ideas" for the war.

In order to remove him from command, Odlum was appointed the high commissioner to Australia from 1941 to 1942, and from 1942 to 1946, he was the envoy extraordinary and minister plenipotentiary to China. In 1947, he was appointed Canada's first ambassador extraordinary and plenipotentiary to Turkey, where he served until 1952.

In the 1953 provincial election, he was an unsuccessful candidate for the BC Liberal Party in the riding of Vancouver-Burrard.

== Personal ==
Odlum was a zealous reader, and in 1963, he donated his collection of 10,000 books to the library at the University of British Columbia.

His son, Major Victor E.C. Odlum studied at the Royal Military College of Canada in Kingston, Ontario in 1923, student # 1713, and served in the Royal Canadian Engineers during the Second World War.

== Bibliography ==
- Granatstein, Jack (2005). The Generals: The Canadian Army's Senior Commanders in the Second World War. University of Calgary Press. ISBN 978-1-55238-176-2.
- Granatstein, Jack (2016). The Weight of Command Voices of Canada's Second World War Generals and Those Who Knew Them. Vancouver: University of British Columbia Press. ISBN 9780774833028.

Military offices
Preceded by New post	GOC 2nd Canadian Infantry Division; 1940–1941	Succeeded by John Roberts
