= Arthur Currie =

Canadian general (1875–1933)

General Sir Arthur Currie GCMG, KCB
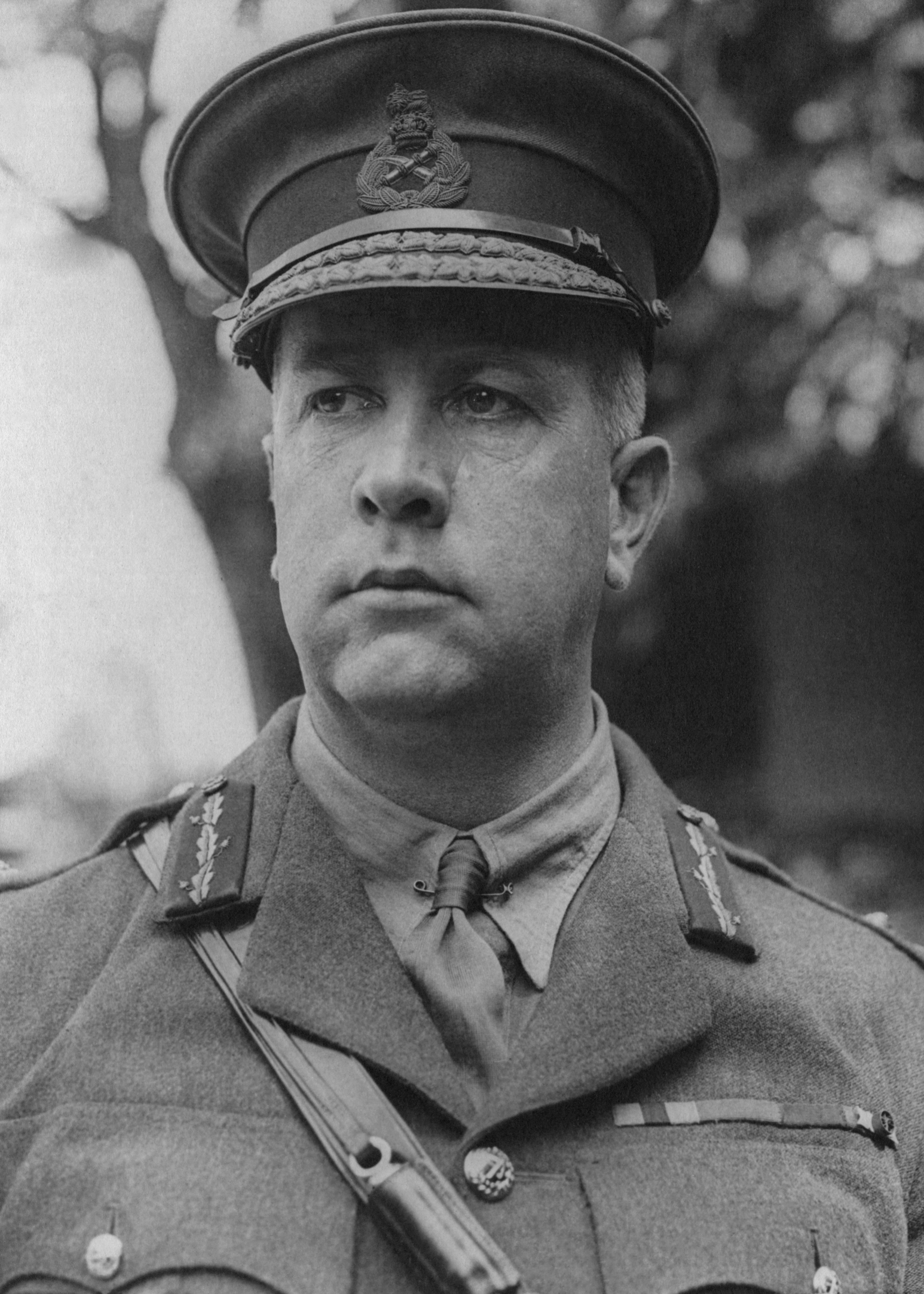
- Currie in 1917
- Born: 5 December 1875; Napperton, Ontario
- Died: 30 November 1933 (aged 57); Montreal, Quebec
- Burial place: Mount Royal Cemetery, Montreal, Quebec
- Military career
- Allegiance: Canada
- Branch: Canadian Militia; Canadian Expeditionary Force
- Service years: 1897–1920
- Rank: General
- Nicknames: "Guts and Gaiters"
- Commands: Inspector General of the Armed Forces (1919–1920); Canadian Corps (1917–1919); 1st Canadian Division (1915–1917); 2nd Canadian Brigade (1914–1915)
- Conflicts: World War I
- Awards: Knight Grand Cross of the Order of St Michael and St George; Knight Commander of the Order of the Bath; Mentioned in Despatches (9); Chevalier of the Legion of Honour (France); Croix de guerre (France); Knight of the Order of the Crown (Belgium); Croix de guerre (Belgium); Distinguished Service Medal (United States)
- Other work: Established Khaki University, Principal & Vice-Chancellor of McGill University

General Sir Arthur William Currie (5 December 1875 – 30 November 1933) was a senior officer of the Canadian Army who fought during World War I. He had the unique distinction of starting his military career on the very bottom rung as a pre-war militia gunner before rising through the ranks to become the first Canadian commander of the Canadian Corps. Currie's success was based on his ability to rapidly adapt brigade tactics to the exigencies of trench warfare, using set piece operations and bite-and-hold tactics. He is generally considered to be among the most capable commanders of the Western Front, and one of the finest commanders in Canadian military history.

Currie began his military career in 1897 as a part-time soldier in the Canadian militia while making his living as a teacher and later as an insurance salesman and real estate speculator. Currie rose quickly through the ranks: commissioned as an officer in 1900, promoted to captain in 1901, then major in 1906 and became an artillery regimental commander in 1909. In 1913 Currie accepted the command of the newly created 50th Regiment Gordon Highlanders of Canada. Finding himself in debt following a real estate crash in Victoria, Currie embezzled ten thousand dollars earmarked for regimental uniforms into his personal accounts to pay off his debts. When the First World War broke out Canadian Minister of Militia Sam Hughes appointed Currie as commander of the 2nd Canadian Brigade. Following the Second Battle of Ypres Currie was promoted to major-general and commander of the 1st Canadian Division. Following the Battle of Vimy Ridge, Canadian Corps commander Julian Byng was promoted to general and Currie, the 1st Canadian Division commander, was promoted to lieutenant-general and assumed command of the Canadian Corps. Upon returning to Canada, Currie was promoted to general and was made Inspector General of the Canadian Army. Although he had only a high school diploma, Currie became the principal and vice-chancellor of McGill University in 1920, holding this post until his death in 1933.

== Early life ==
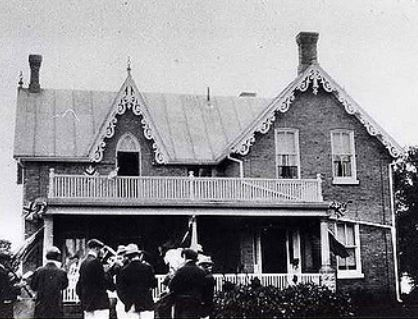
The farm homestead of Arthur Currie (1919)

Arthur Currie was born on 5 December 1875 to William Garner Curry and Jane Patterson on their farm near the hamlet of Napperton, Ontario, just west of Strathroy. He was the third in a family of eight children and grew up on the homestead of his paternal grandparents, John Corrigan and Jane Garner. Currie's grandparents had emigrated from Ireland in 1838 to escape religious strife, and upon their arrival in Canada they had converted from Catholicism and Anglicanism to Methodism, changing the family name from Corrigan to Curry. Arthur Currie modified the spelling of his surname from Curry to Currie in 1897.

Currie was educated in local common schools and at the Strathroy District Collegiate Institute, where he proved to be a good student especially interested in literature. He had plans to pursue a professional career in law or medicine; however, the death of his father when Arthur was fifteen made this impossible due to his limited financial means. Currie instead pursued teacher training, but he was unable to secure a job and returned to high school to complete an honours certificate in order to gain university entrance. In May 1894, mere months before his final exams, Currie quarrelled with one of his teachers, and subsequently left high school to seek his fortune in British Columbia, hoping to take advantage of the financial boom resulting from the construction of the transcontinental railway. However, Currie found no prospects outside of teaching, so he qualified as a teacher in British Columbia and took a teaching position on the Saanich Peninsula north of Victoria, British Columbia. In 1896 Currie moved to Victoria, taking a position at Boy's Central School and later Victoria High School.

== Early military career ==
On 6 May 1897 Currie joined the Canadian Militia as a part-time gunner for the 5th (British Columbia) Field Artillery Regiment. Currie achieved the rank of corporal in 1900 and was soon after offered an officer's commission, which would give him a much higher status in the social circles of Victoria. A military commission was however an expensive proposition. Officers were expected to provide their own set of tailored uniforms and to donate their pay to the officer's mess. Currie was discouraged by his financial prospects as a teacher; and consequently, in February 1900, he left teaching and took a position as an insurance salesman with Matson & Coles, a local insurance firm. On 14 August 1901 Currie married Lucy Chaworth-Musters, who had been raised by Currie's aunt and uncle in British Columbia after being abandoned by her British military officer father following the death of her mother in childbirth.

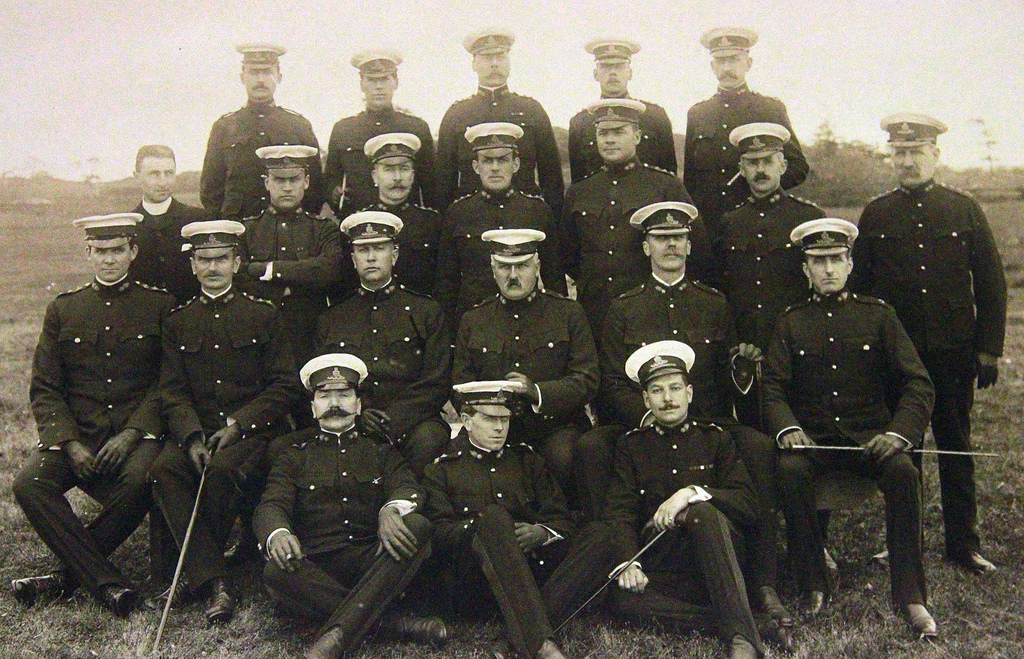
Officers of the 5th Regiment at Macaulay Point in 1909. Currie is seated on the bench, third from left.

Currie took on his role as militia officer seriously. He attended every available course offered by the British Army Contingent at Work Point Barracks in Esquimalt, often ordered military text books from London and was found on the shooting range every Saturday. He was a keen marksman and was elected president of the British Columbia Rifle Association in 1905. Currie was promoted to captain in November 1901, and then to major in 1906. By September 1909, he had risen to the rank of lieutenant-colonel, commanding the 5th Regiment. Apart from his interest in the militia, Currie was also an active Freemason, rising to the position of deputy grandmaster of the Victoria District of Freemasonry in 1907. He also served two years as president of the Young Men's Liberal Association of Victoria, and several times was suggested as a candidate for the provincial legislature.

In addition to his military career, Currie continued to be active in business. He was appointed head of the Matson Insurance Firm in 1904 when Sam Matson, who had many business interests beyond his insurance firm, decided to concentrate his energy on publishing the Daily Colonist. With a land speculation boom in Victoria in full swing, Currie and a Victoria businessman, R. A. Power, formed Currie & Power in 1908. Currie invested heavily in the real estate market. The firm was a success until 1912 when property prices began to decline. In 1913 Currie's financial situation deteriorated rapidly as the value of his real estate holdings decreased and he became financially over-extended. In August, Currie's five-year term as commander of the 5th Regiment came to a close and he faced a forced retirement from the Canadian Militia at the age of 38. At this critical juncture, he was approached to take command of a new militia regiment.

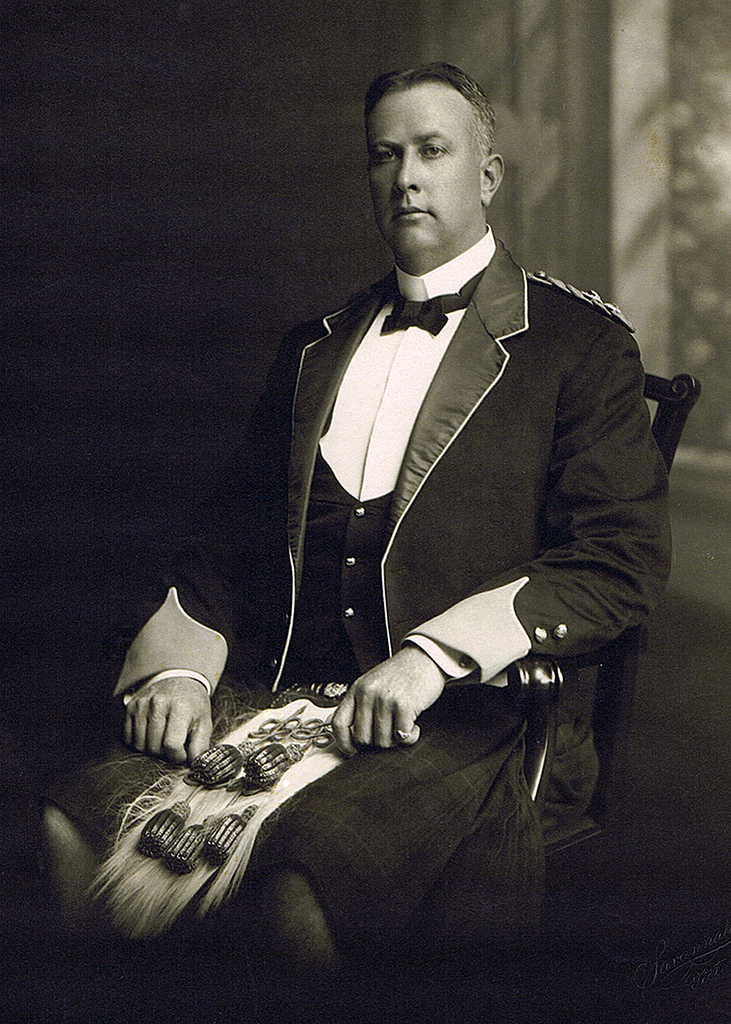
Lieutenant-Colonel Arthur Currie in Highland dress of the 50th Regiment

Following the Canadian federal election of 1911, Minister of Militia and Defence Sam Hughes had ordered a rapid expansion of the national force. The large number of Scottish citizens of Victoria appealed for the formation of a Highland regiment in Victoria to augment the 88th Regiment Victoria Fusiliers, which had been formed in 1912. On 15 August 1913 the government authorized the formation of the 50th Regiment Gordon Highlanders of Canada. The originally designated commanding officer for the new regiment failed to qualify for the post and Currie was approached as a logical replacement. Currie initially turned down the idea, likely recognizing that the cost of the new Highland uniforms and mess bills would only add to his financial problems. His subordinate and friend, Major Garnet Hughes, Sam Hughes' son, was responsible for persuading Currie to reconsider and accept the position. Currie attended the Militia Staff Course conducted by Major Louis Lipsett, future commander of the 3rd Canadian Division, and qualified in March 1914.

Currie was desperate to avoid personal bankruptcy, which would have resulted in a loss in social standing and forced him to resign his commission. On 31 July 1914, Currie received CA$10,833.34 (equivalent to $296,472 in 2025) from the Militia Department with which to purchase new uniforms. Instead of using the funds to pay contractor Moore, Taggart and Co for the regimental uniforms, Currie embezzled the funds to pay off his personal debts. The 50th Regiment's honorary colonel, William Coy, had promised to underwrite the regiment with $35,000, and Currie planned to use the funds to pay the uniform contractor. Unfortunately for Currie, Coy did not follow through with his financial commitment to the regiment, leaving Currie's accounting sleight-of-hand potentially exposed.

When World War I broke out and Canada found itself at war on 4 August 1914, Currie was offered command of Military District No. 11 – British Columbia. When he turned this down, he was then offered command of the 2nd Infantry Brigade of the Canadian Expeditionary Force's 1st Canadian Division. Currie considered turning down this offer as well so he could attempt to solve his financial woes. He once again changed his mind at the urging of Garnet Hughes. Currie's promotion to brigadier-general was confirmed on 29 September 1914, and he took command of the 2nd Brigade at the Valcartier Camp in Quebec. When the 50th Regiment's acting commanding officer, Major Cecil Roberts, wrote to him inquiring as to the status of the uniform grant, Currie ignored the correspondence and sailed overseas with his brigade in October 1914.

== World War I ==
=== Brigade commander ===
The 1st Canadian Division spent the winter of 1914–15 training in England, and were sent to France in February 1915. After a period of indoctrination in the realities of trench warfare, they took control of a section of trench in the Ypres Salient on 17 April 1915. Only five days later, the Germans used poison gas for the first time on the Western Front. French colonial troops on the Canadians' left flank broke, leaving a 7-kilometre (4.3 mi) long hole in the Allied line. In the chaos that followed, Currie proved his worth as a leader by assessing the situation, and coolly issuing commands from his brigade headquarters even as it was gassed and then destroyed by fire. Currie cobbled together a fluid defence and counterattacked. At one point, he personally went back to the rear to try to convince two regiments of British reinforcements to move forward. After several days of fierce fighting, Allied counterattacks re-established a stable defensive line, denying the Germans a breakthrough.

Currie's leadership during the Second Battle of Ypres was a source of dispute by British historian James Edward Edmonds, who argued that Currie and his 2nd Canadian Brigade performed poorly at Ypres. Currie, supported by the Canadian official historian Colonel Archer Fortescue Duguid, waged a vigorous defense, charging that Edmonds was seeking to diminish the Canadian contribution to the Second Battle of Ypres. Edmonds wrongly accused Currie of ordering his men to retreat on 24 April 1915 because of the chaos caused by the chlorine gas and fierce attacks of the German infantry; Currie and Duguid said it was Brigadier-General Richard Turner, commanding the 3rd Canadian Brigade on Currie's left, who had ordered a retreat without orders, leaving Currie with an exposed left flank. Canadian historian Timothy Travers also argued that Edmonds was very unfair to Currie since the 1st Canadian Division occupied a position that would have been difficult to defend even under normal conditions, without considering the effects of the first mass use of poison gas and the complete withdrawal of French forces on their left flank. Although acknowledging that Currie had made mistakes, Travers maintained that unlike the Algerians who fled, Currie's 2nd Brigade held its ground at Ypres, consequently losing 46% of its total strength either killed or wounded over two days of fighting.

Following the battle, Currie was promoted to major-general, and given command of the entire 1st Canadian Division. He was also appointed a Companion of the Order of the Bath (CB) and a Commander of the Legion d'Honneur.

=== Division commander ===
Although the Canadians did not take part in the infamous Anglo-French offensive on the Somme on 1 July 1916, they did eventually move into the line in the fall to aid the slow crawl forward. Currie proved himself to be the master of the set-piece assault, designed to take limited objectives and then hold on in the face of inevitable German counterattacks. It was at this time that Currie lost favour with former friends Sam and Garnet Hughes. Sam Hughes wanted Garnet promoted to command of a division, but Currie, having seen Garnet in action at the Second Battle of Ypres, believed Garnet to be an incompetent officer, and refused. Currie's reputation was on the rise, and Hughes did not have the necessary leverage to force Currie to comply.

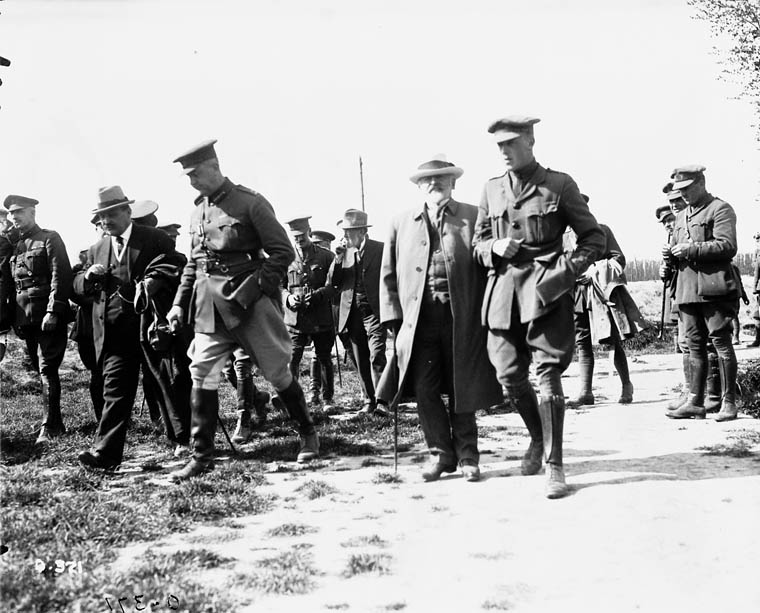
Major General Currie (third from left), GOC 1st Canadian Division, during a visit of Canadian senators to the Western Front, July 1916.

By late 1916, the four Canadian divisions were in France, gathered together as the Canadian Corps under the command of Sir Julian Byng. The British High Command informed Byng that the Canadians would have a central role in the upcoming Battle of Arras by attacking Vimy Ridge, 8 km (5.0 mi) northeast of Arras on the western edge of the Douai Plains. Byng ordered Currie to study the Battle of the Somme and advise what lessons could be taken and applied. Currie was also among a set of officers who attended a series of lectures hosted by the French Army regarding their experiences during the Battle of Verdun. Currie not only questioned senior French officers but also sought out junior officers and asked the same questions, carefully noting the discrepancies between the senior officers' beliefs and the junior officers' experiences. On 20 January 1917 Currie began a series of well received lectures to Corps and divisional headquarters based on his research. In response to the Verdun visit, organizational changes were made to the platoon structure within the infantry battalions that would later become corps-wide changes. In his report, Currie evaluated not only the French tactics but also what the Canadians had done wrong in the fighting around Pozières in 1916. Currie summarized the primary factors behind successful French offensive operations as: careful staff work, thorough artillery preparation and support, the element of surprise, and a high state of training in the infantry units detailed for the assault.

Currie, in command of the 1st Canadian Division, was responsible for the broad southern sector of the Canadian Corps advance and expected to make the greatest advance in terms of distance. The attack was to begin at 5:30 am on Easter Monday, 9 April 1917. By the end of the first day, the 1st Canadian Division had captured all of its first line objectives and the left half of its second line. The next morning by 9:30 am, fresh troops had leap-frogged existing battalions to advance to the third objective line. To permit the troops time to consolidate the third line, the advance halted and the barrage remained stationary for ninety minutes while machine guns were brought forward. Shortly before 1:00 pm, the advance recommenced and, by 2:00 pm, the 1st Canadian Division secured their final objective.

=== Canadian Corps commander ===
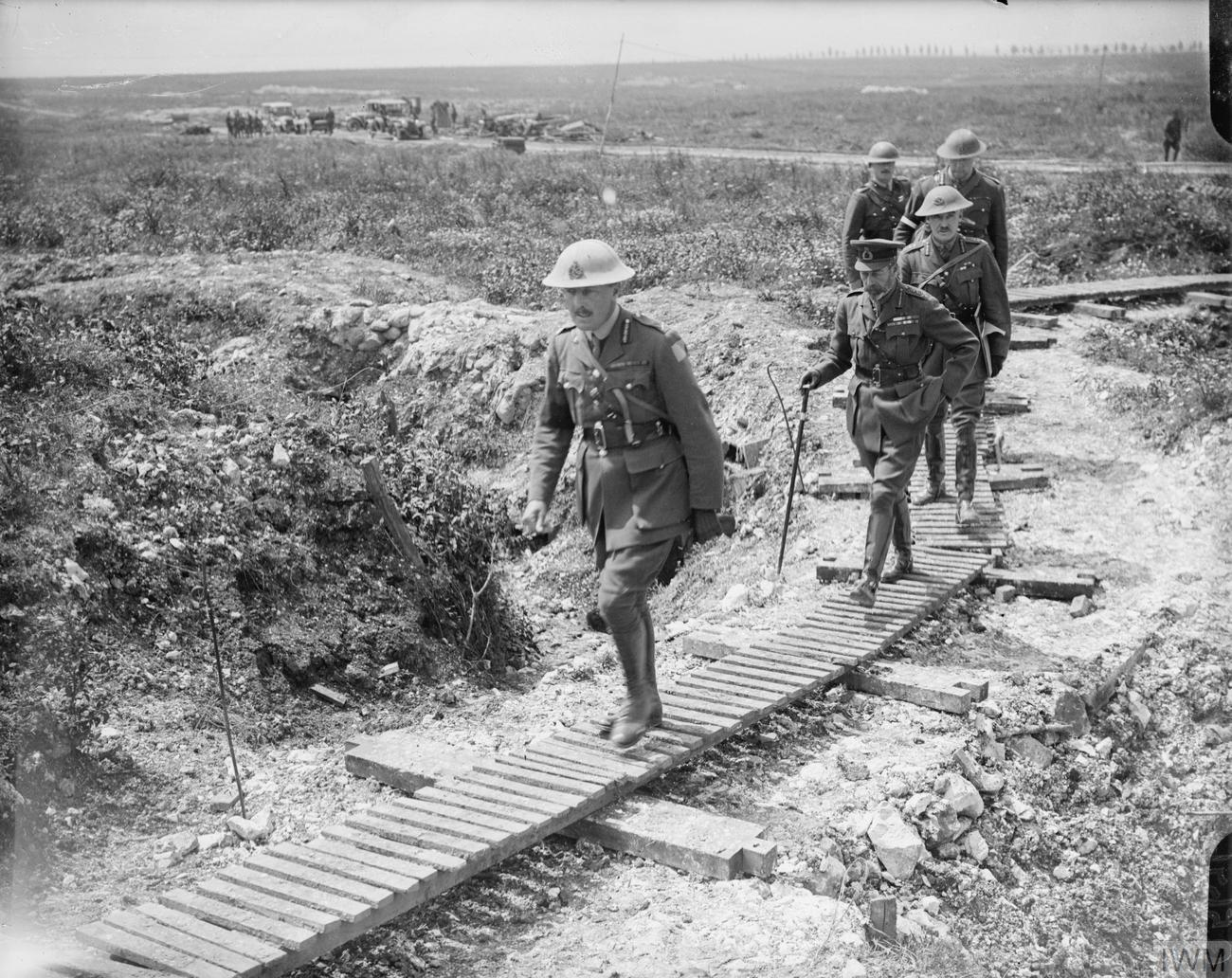
King George V visits Vimy Ridge, 11 July 1917. With him are Lieutenant General Horne, Currie, and two others, with Major General Louis Lipsett, GOC 3rd Canadian Division, at the front leading the way.

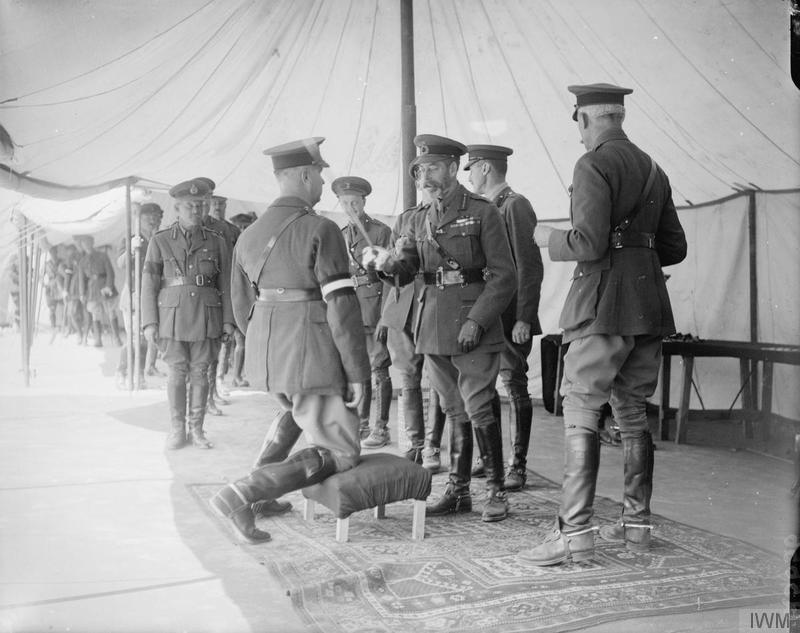
King George V conferring the honour of knighthood on Currie on 12 July 1917.

When Byng was promoted to general in command of the British Third Army in June 1917, Currie was raised to the temporary rank of lieutenant-general on 9 June, and given command of the entire Canadian Corps. Currie was knighted by King George V and appointed Knight Commander of the Order of St Michael and St George (KCMG) in the King's Birthday Honours of 4 June 1917. As he was taking command of the corps, word reached Currie that the Canadian cabinet had been informed of his embezzlement. To avoid news of the scandal from breaking, Currie borrowed money from two wealthy subordinates, David Watson and Victor Odlum, to finally pay back the money he had stolen from the 50th Regiment.

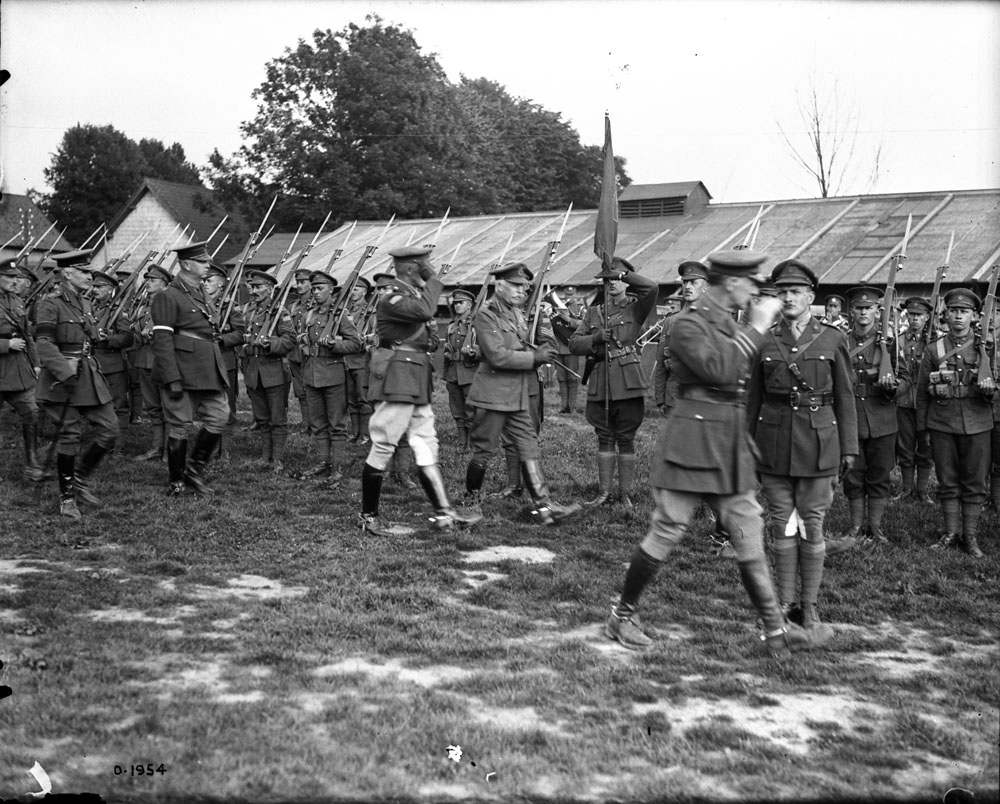
The Duke of Connaught inspecting the PPCLI guard of honour, September 1917. Stood not far behind him is Lieutenant General Currie.

The British First Army commander Lieutenant-General Henry Horne ordered the Canadian Corps to relieve I Corps opposite the city of Lens on 10 July 1917, and directed Currie to develop a plan for capturing the city by the end of July 1917. The operation was intended to engage as many German formations as possible and to prevent them from reinforcing the Ypres sector during the Third Battle of Ypres. After examining the area, Currie instead proposed to take the high ground outside the city, marked on allied maps as Hill 70, hold the feature in the expectation of a German counterattack, and inflict casualties by preparing a zone of concentrated artillery and machine gun fire. Currie's plan was implemented successfully, and by the end of the battle, some 20,000 Germans had been killed or wounded at the cost of 9,000 Canadians. The operation was effective in preventing German formations from transferring local men and equipment to Ypres, and Haig believed that the Battle of Hill 70 was one of the finest minor operations of the war.

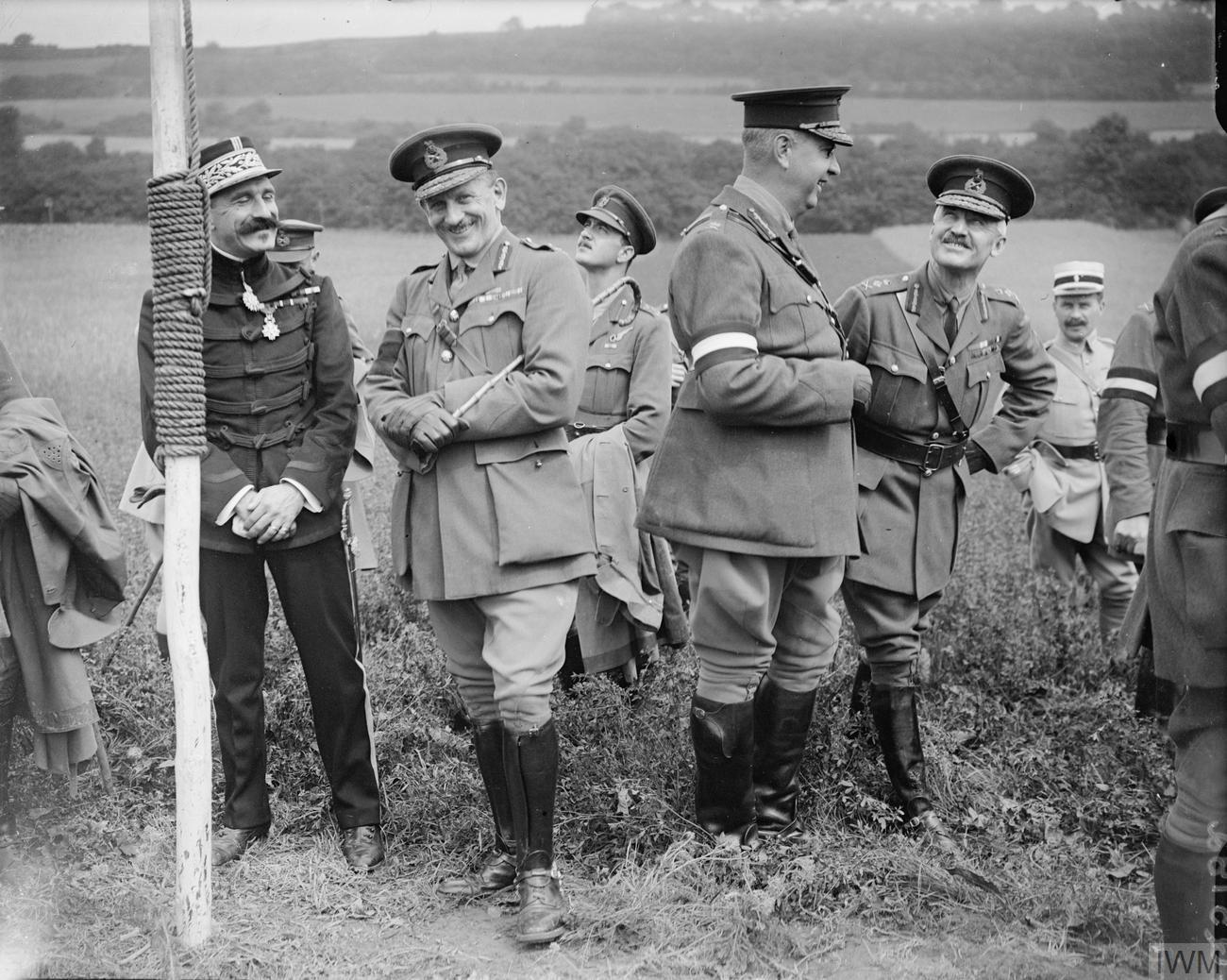
Lieutenant-General Sir Henry Horne, GOC British First Army, and Lieutenant-General Currie, GOC Canadian Corps, at the First Army Commemoration Service of the beginning of the fourth year of the war, Ranchicourt, France, 5 August 1917. French officers are also present.

The Canadian Corps was then transferred from Lens to Ypres to take part in the Battle of Passchendaele. Currie was tasked with continuing the advance started by the now exhausted II Anzac Corps in order to ultimately capture Passchendaele village and gain favourable observation positions and drier winter positions. Currie submitted his provisional operational plan on 16 October and presented a plan with extensive resources made available in reserve. He estimated the attack would result in 16,000 casualties. Currie's preparations included reconnaissance, road construction and a massing of artillery and heavy machine guns. Rather than one mass assault, Currie designed a series of well-prepared, sharp attacks that allowed the Corps to take an objective and then hold it against the inevitable German counterattacks. By 30 October, the Canadians, aided by two British divisions, gained the outskirts of the village in a driving rainstorm, and then held on for five days against intense shelling and counter-attacks, often standing waist deep in mud as they fought. The Canadians' victory came at the cost of 15,654 casualties, including 4,028 killed. Currie's grim casualty prediction had been accurate.

=== End of the war ===
By early 1918 the Canadian Corps was in a state of uncertainty. The Canadian government wanted to expand the Canadian Corps by forming a 5th Division but the BEF wanted the Canadian Corps reorganized to mirror British divisions. British command also intended to integrate American battalions into the depleted corps, which Currie predicted would be a disaster and would destroy the homogeneous structure of the corps. Currie was opposed to all those measures since he did not view them as being in the best interests of the corps. Currie, with the aid of the Minister of Overseas Military Forces, prevailed against the structural changes. The Canadian Corps retained its original Canadian organizational structure and fought as a homogeneous formation for the entire Hundred Days Offensive.

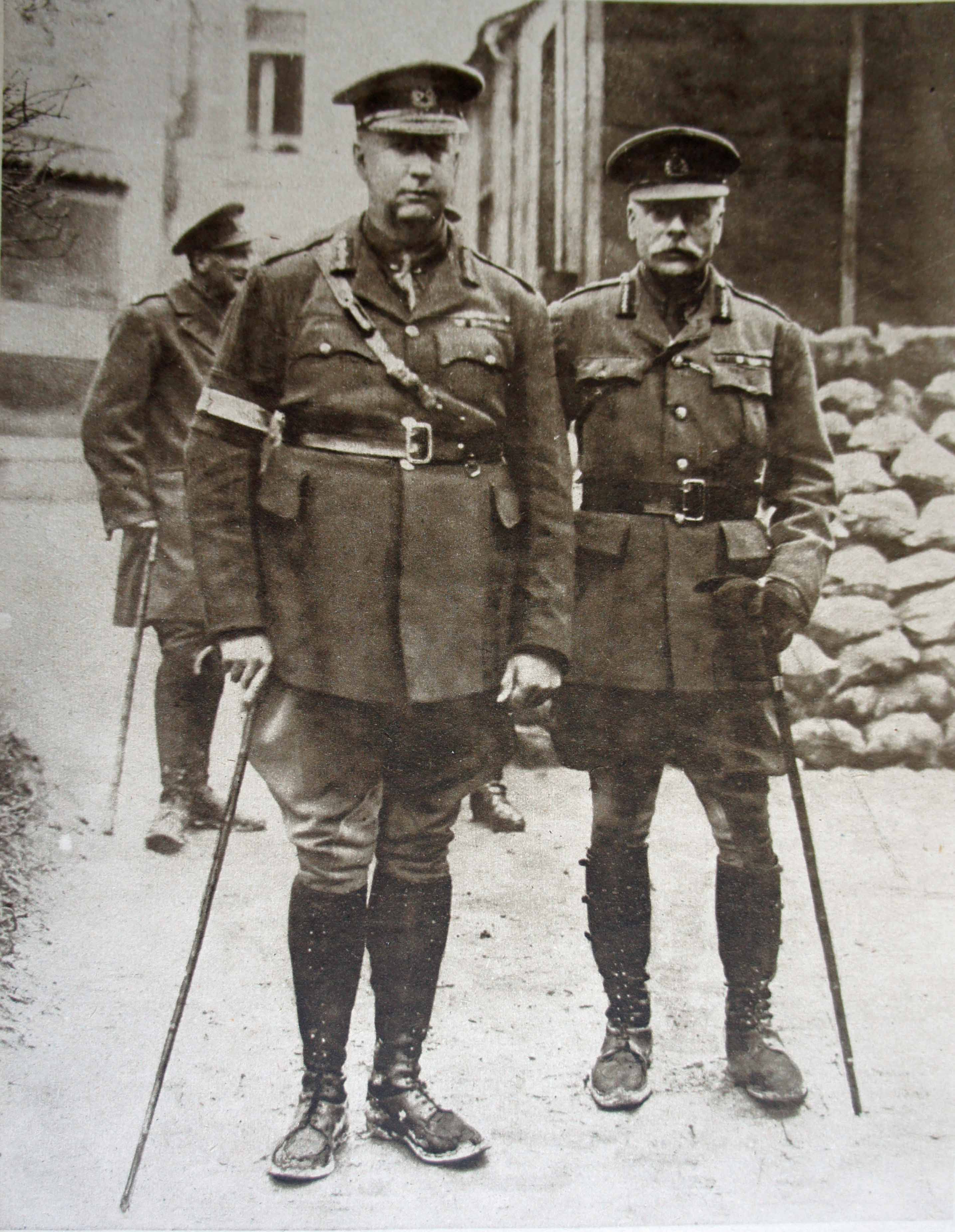
Currie and Field Marshal Sir Douglas Haig, C-in-C of the BEF, 1918.

On 21 March 1918 the Germans launched a major Spring Offensive hoping to force an armistice on their terms, but by the summer their forward momentum had been contained and the Allies prepared to counterattack. In August 1918, when Currie was ordered to move the corps 70 miles (110 km) south to Amiens, the Canadians took pains to camouflage their move. This included sending a radio unit and two battalions to Ypres as a diversion. With no preliminary artillery bombardment at Amiens to warn the Germans, the attack on 8 August was a success. The Canadians were withdrawn from the line, and moved to the Somme, where they participated in the attack on the Hindenburg Line at the Drocourt–Quéant Line on 2 September. The assault resulted in the Germans being overrun along a 7,000-yard (6,400 m) front. Historian Denis Winter called the seizure of the Drocourt–Quéant line by the Canadian Corps the "greatest single achievement" of the British Expeditionary Force during the entire war, and praised Currie for his ability to bring an "unprecedented" concentration of artillery and machine gun fire together with flexible infantry sections that were adjusted for the situation. The German Seventeenth Army then retreated behind the flooded Canal du Nord. Currie took three weeks to prepare perhaps his most audacious plan: he suggested the entire corps cross the drier section of the canal on a front of only 2,700 yards (2,500 m). On 27 September the entire corps moved across the canal as planned, and then through the German lines in a series of planned zig-zag manoeuvres designed to confuse the Germans. Exhausted and demoralized, the German army staged a controlled retreat over the next five weeks. On 10 November, in what was to be his most controversial decision, Currie, under orders to continue to advance, ordered elements of the corps to liberate Mons. On the morning of 11 November, as Currie received orders confirming there would be a general armistice at 11:00 am, the capture of Mons was completed.

In December 1918, Currie established the Canadian War Narrative Section to maintain a level of control as to how the Canadian contribution to the Hundred Days Offensive would be documented in print and presented to the public. Tim Cook argues that the Canadian War Narrative Section was an important step in not only recording and presenting the achievements of the Canadian Corps but also in restoring Currie's damaged reputation, which had been battered by Sam Hughes and his supporters in Parliament. Hughes frequently referred to Currie as a butcher.

== Post-war ==
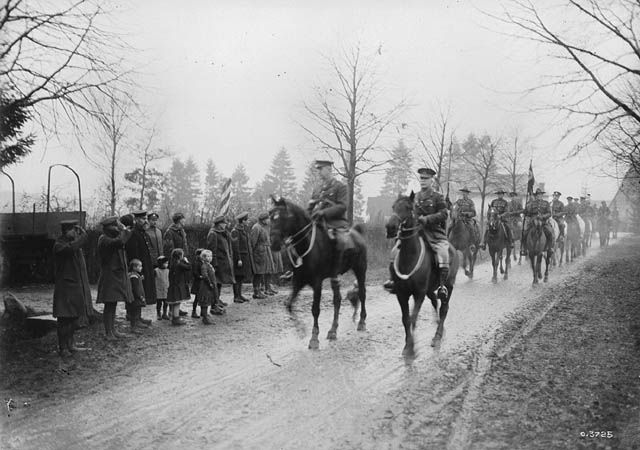
Canadian troops entering Germany en route to the Rhine River, Germany, November 1918. On horseback is Lieutenant General Currie, GOC Canadian Corps, and Major General Archibald Cameron Macdonell, GOC 1st Canadian Division.

Currie and family had moved to England in 1915. They returned to Canada following the war, arriving in Halifax on 17 August 1919. No band or crowd received the ship when it docked and when Currie arrived at the Victoria Memorial Building to greet the 13th Canadian Parliament he received a lukewarm reception. Currie was appointed Inspector General of the Armed Forces and was then promoted to full general on 10 December, the highest ranking position in the Canadian forces. Currie intended to use the position to reform the military. However, in the post-war period, military funding was cut and Currie encountered significant opposition from the military bureaucracy to organizational changes. Deeply unhappy, Currie retired from the military, and in May 1920 accepted the position of principal and vice-chancellor of McGill University in Montreal.

=== McGill University ===
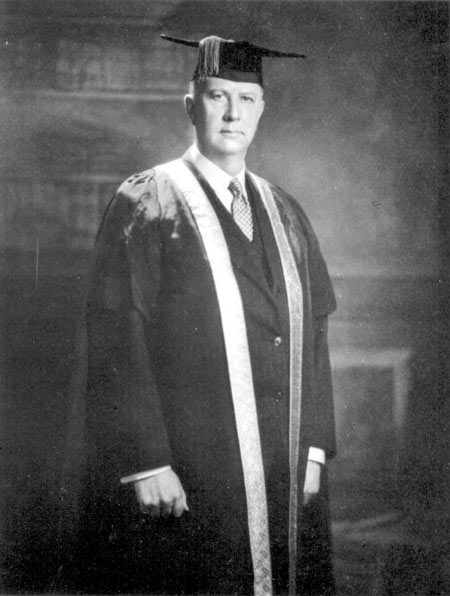
Currie as the McGill University Principal in 1930

Currie had only a high school diploma, but on the recommendation of McGill's acting principal, Frank Dawson Adams, Currie was selected as principal and vice-chancellor of McGill University on the basis of his "exceptional powers of organization and administration" and his "capacity for inspiration and leadership" rather than academic prowess. Within months of Currie's appointment, he led a fund-raising campaign to revive the university, travelling from coast to coast in a personal appeal for support; the fundraising campaign raised CA$6.5 million, more than the original goal of CA$5 million. Currie made a name for himself as a premier university administrator. From 1925 to 1927 he served as president of the National Conference of Canadian Universities and was elected as a trustee of the Carnegie Foundation for the Advancement of Teaching in 1927. Currie was also instrumental in saving the School for Graduate Nurses at Royal Victoria College from closure in the early 1930s. During Currie's time as McGill's Principal the university established the Faculty of Music, the School for Graduate Nurses, and the Faculty of Graduate Studies and Research, and doubled its income despite the difficulties brought on by the Great Depression. Currie was also President of the Last Post Fund from 1924 to 1932.

=== Libel suit ===
In June 1927, the city of Mons erected a plaque commemorating its liberation by the Canadian Corps nine years earlier. But, when this event was reported in Canadian newspapers, Currie's enemies took the opportunity to again question the necessity of the final day of fighting. A front-page editorial published on 13 June 1927 by the Hughes-friendly Port Hope Evening Guide argued that Currie was either negligent or deliberate in wasting the lives of soldiers under his command in taking Mons on the final day of the war. The newspaper had only a small local circulation, and Currie's friends advised him against pursuing the matter. However, Currie was unwilling to let the matter go, and sued the newspaper for libel, seeking $50,000 ($902,000 today) in damages. The trial in April 1928 was front-page news across Canada. On the stand, Currie testified that he had been under orders from Allied Supreme Commander Ferdinand Foch to pursue German forces; to do otherwise would have been treason. Many of Currie's senior officers testified that Currie had urged them to advance with caution, avoiding unnecessary casualties. At the end of the trial, the jury returned a verdict after four hours, finding the newspaper guilty of libel but awarding Currie only $500 ($9,000 today) in damages, plus costs.

Although Currie was awarded only a small portion of the value sought, newspapers across Canada referred to the result as a victory for him. The trial helped to restore Currie's reputation; however, the stress took a toll on his health. Currie was subsequently elected Dominion president of the Canadian Legion of the British Empire Service League in 1928. However, he suffered a stroke the following year and his ill health obliged him to resign, whereupon he was bestowed with the honorary title of Grand President.

=== Death ===
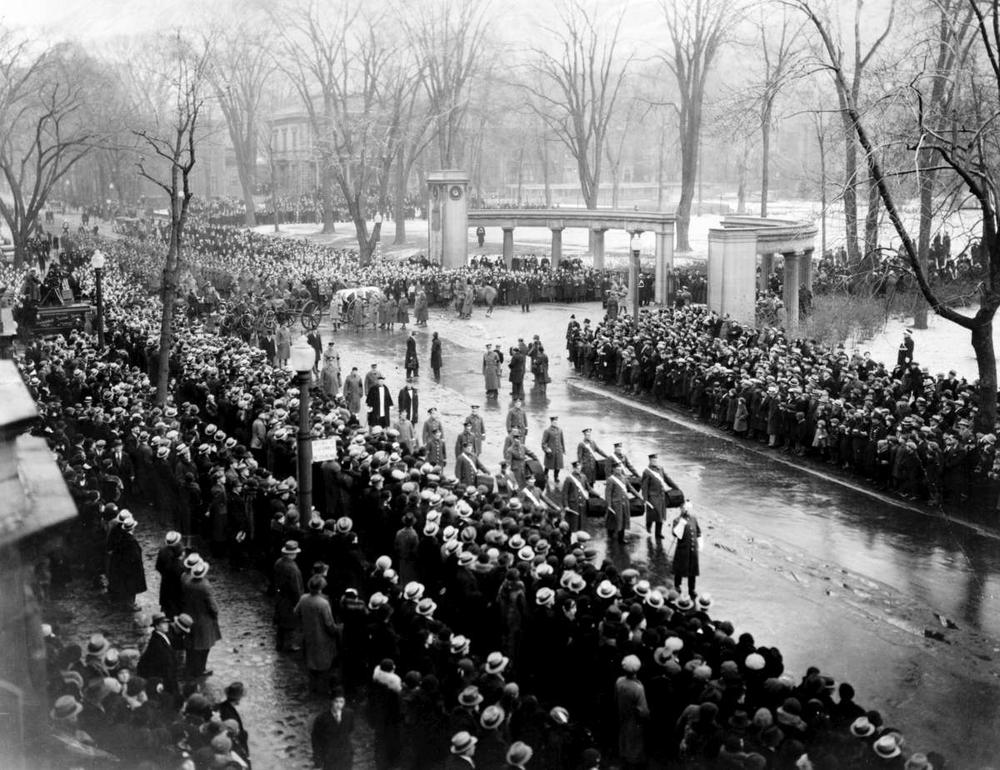
Funeral procession of Arthur Currie in Montreal, Quebec

Currie suffered another stroke on 5 November 1933 and died on 30 November at the age of 57 at Royal Victoria Hospital from bronchial complications brought on by pneumonia. His civilian and military funeral on 5 December was held in Montreal and was the largest to that point in Canadian history. The Times wrote of his funeral: "It was, by common consent, the most impressive funeral ever seen at Montreal" and Robert Borden believed the ceremony "was perhaps more elaborate than at any state or military funeral in the history of Canada". Approximately 150,000 people lined the streets to watch the procession and the Canadian Radio Broadcasting Commission broadcast the funeral over radio. Those attending the funeral included Lord Bessborough, at the time the Governor General of Canada, important Canadian politicians, foreign diplomats and representatives of McGill University. No less than 170 organizations sent floral tributes. The service was conducted by the Bishop of Montreal at Christ Church Cathedral and was followed by a graveside service presided over by Archdeacon (Hon. Colonel) John Almond, a wartime Director of the Canadian Chaplain Service for the Canadian Expeditionary Force. Eight general officers acted as pallbearers. The funeral procession received a 17-gun salute. In London a memorial service was conducted in Westminster Abbey on the same day as the funeral in Montreal, which was filled to capacity. Memorial services were held elsewhere in Canada also. On 3 December, 7,000 persons attended a memorial service for Currie at Toronto's Arena Gardens. Currie was initially interred in a family plot at Mount Royal Cemetery in Montreal. However, three years after his death, Currie's remains were moved to a more prominent site surmounted by a cross of sacrifice.

Currie's wife, Lucy, was left in some financial difficulty following her husband's death when McGill decided it could not afford to continue paying her a portion of his salary. In 1935 the Canadian government recognized his service to Canada by granting $50,000 to his estate.

== Honours and tribute ==
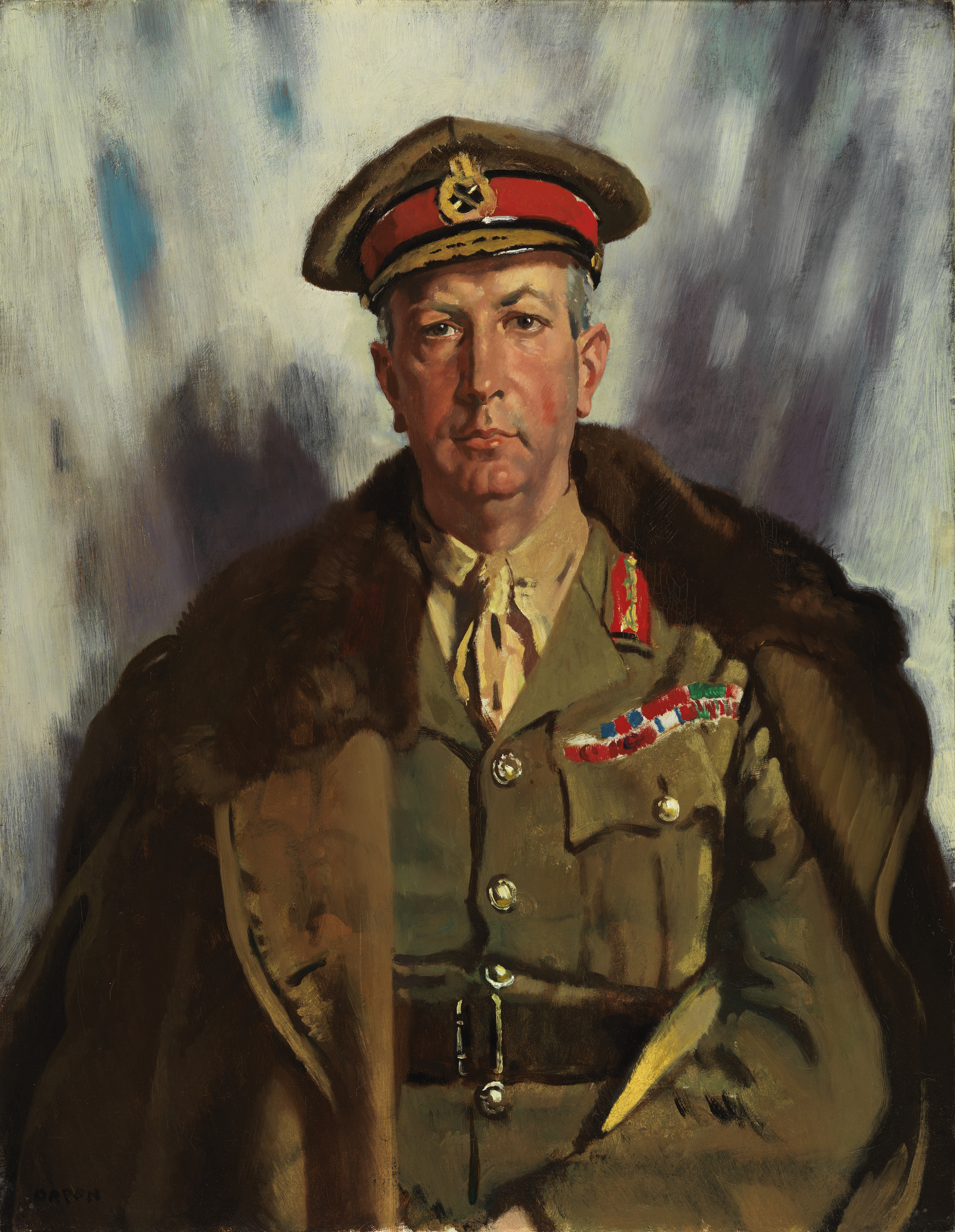
Portrait of Currie by Irish war artist William Orpen, 1919

Currie was named a Companion of the Order of the Bath (CB) after the Second Battle of Ypres in the 1915 Birthday Honours and promoted Knight Commander of the Order of the Bath (KCB) in the 1918 New Year Honours. He was made a Knight Grand Cross of the Order of St Michael and St George in the 1919 New Year Honours, and was Mentioned in Despatches nine times over the course of the war. Currie also received a number of foreign awards, including the French Légion d'honneur and Croix de guerre (with Palm), the Belgian Croix de guerre and Order of the Crown, and the US Distinguished Service Medal. Currie's contributions both to the war effort as well as post-war education was recognized in 19 honorary degrees.

Many tributes have been made to Currie. In 1919 General Currie Elementary School was built in Richmond, British Columbia. A Sir Arthur Currie Elementary School under the Protestant School Board of Greater Montreal was also built. Mount Currie (2810 m) at the Spray River headwaters in Banff National Park is named after Currie. The Currie Barracks in Calgary opened in 1933 was named in his honour (later renamed to CFB Calgary). In 1934, Currie was designated as a Canadian Person of National Historic Significance. The Currie Building and Currie Hall at the Royal Military College of Canada in Kingston, Ontario were subsequently named in his honour. In Victoria the street where Currie lived was renamed Arthur Currie Lane and an on-campus housing building at University of Victoria is named in his honour. In Strathroy, Ontario the local branch of the Royal Canadian Legion bears his name, and a statue has been raised to him. Robert A. Heinlein, in his science fiction novel Starship Troopers, named one of the basic training facilities "Camp Arthur Currie". In 2006 Canada honoured Currie as one of fourteen Canadians in the Valiants Memorial, and is one of the five people commemorated with a life-sized statue. and the Sir Arthur Currie Memorial Gymnasium at McGill University in Montreal.

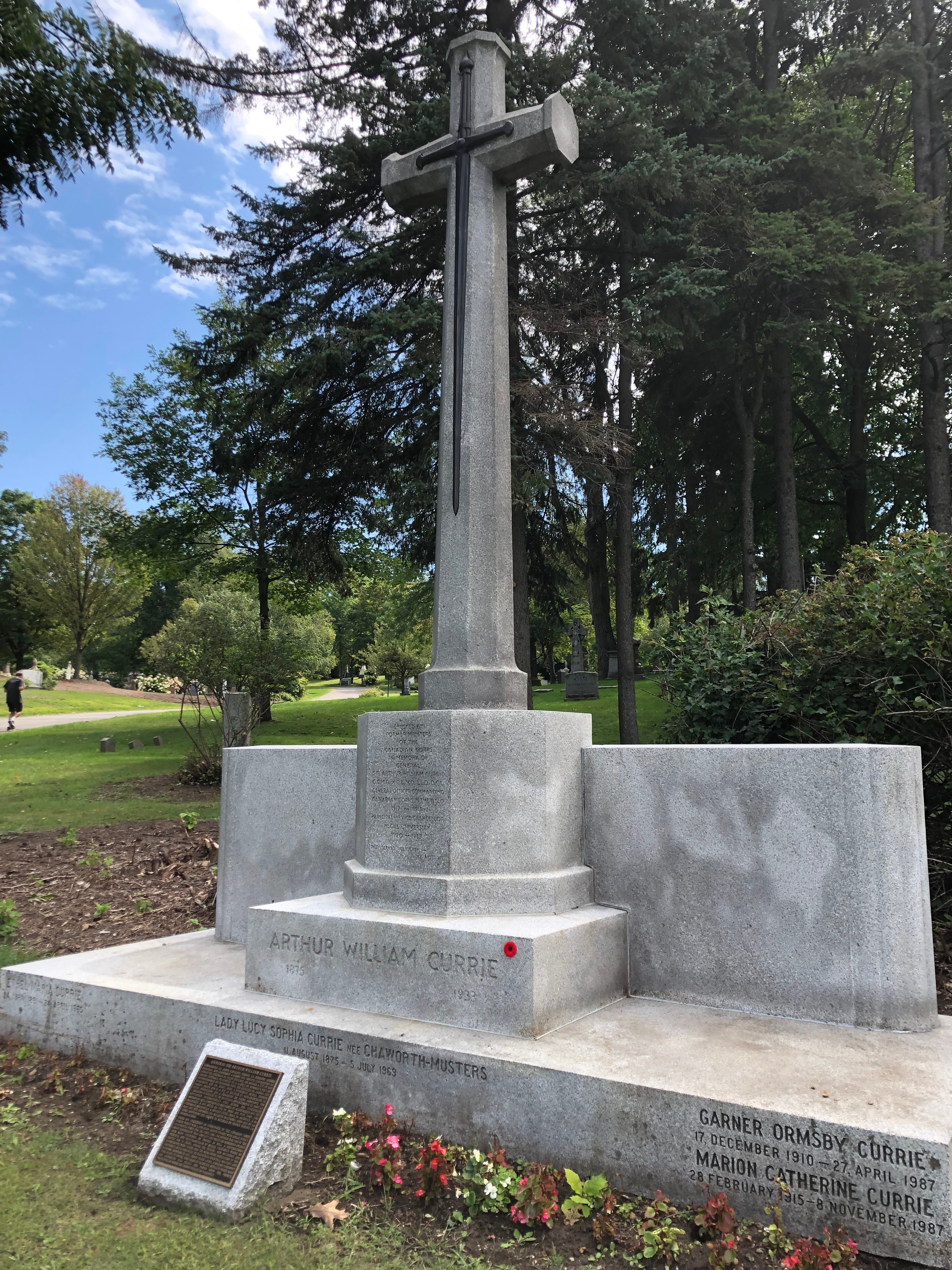
Currie's funeral monument in Mount Royal Cemetery

== Legacy ==
Canadian historians, including Pierre Berton and Jack Granatstein, have described Currie as Canada's greatest military commander. Although physically a large man, standing over six feet tall, Currie did not cut a heroic military figure. Nor was he a charismatic speaker. Described as aloof by his troops, who called him "Guts and Gaiters", he nevertheless inspired them. He was a brilliant tactician who used his skills to reduce casualties and is credited with accelerating the end of the war. According to historian Jack Hyatt, "His slogan was, 'Pay the price of victory in shells – not lives,' and if he did anything heroic it was that." Currie's leadership of the Canadian Corps was described in an article in Maclean's: "No flashing genius, but a capable administrator, cool headed and even tempered and sound of judgment. He has surrounded himself with a capable staff whose counsel he shares and whose advice he takes. He is the last man in the world to stick to his own plan if a better one offers. So far as tactics go he is first among equals for such is the way his staff works."

== Arms ==
Coat of arms of Sir David-William Smith, Baronet
Crest Two demi-lions combatant supporting a spur, rowel downwards, Or Helm Helm of a baronet or knight Escutcheon Or two swords in saltire, on a chief Sable two roses Or Supporters Two winged rams guardant collared Or Motto THINE OWN REPROACH ALONE DO FEAR Orders Order of Saint Michael and Saint George; Order of the Bath

== Bibliography ==
- Berton, Pierre (1986). Vimy. Toronto: McClelland & Stewart. ISBN 0771013396.
- Bosher, J. F. (2012). Imperial Vancouver Island : who was who, 1850–1950. Woodstock, Oxfordshire: J.F. Bosher in conjunction with Writersworld. ISBN 978-0957375307.
- Bishop, William Arthur (1997). Salute!: Canada's Great Military Leaders from Brock to Dextraze. Toronto: McGraw-Hill Ryerson. ISBN 978-0075600107.
- Brennan, Patrick (2007), "Julian Byng and Leadership in the Canadian Corps", in Hayes, Geoffrey; Iarocci, Andrew; Bechthold, Mike (eds.), Vimy Ridge: A Canadian Reassessment, Waterloo: Wilfrid Laurier University Press, pp. 87–104, ISBN 978-0889205086
- Brown, R Craig; Morton, Desmond (March 1979). "The Embarrassing Apotheosis of a 'Great Canadian': Sir Arthur Currie's Personal Crisis in 1917". Canadian Historical Review. 60 (1): 41–63. doi:10.3138/chr-060-01-03.
- Campbell, David (2007), "The 2nd Canadian Division: A 'Most Spectacular Battle'", in Hayes, Geoffrey; Iarocci, Andrew; Bechthold, Mike (eds.), Vimy Ridge: A Canadian Reassessment, Waterloo: Wilfrid Laurier University Press, pp. 171–192, ISBN 978-0889205086
- Cassar, George (2010). Hell in Flanders Fields : Canadians at the second battle of Ypres. Toronto: Dundurn Press. ISBN 978-1554887286.
- Cook, Tim (December 2004). "The Madman and the Butcher: Sir Sam Hughes, Sir Arthur Currie, and Their War of Reputations". The Canadian Historical Review. 85 (4): 693–719. doi:10.1353/can.2005.0013. S2CID 159889647.
- Cook, Tim (2006). Clio's warriors : Canadian historians and the writing of the world wars. Vancouver: UBC Press. ISBN 0774812575.
- Crerar, Duff (2014). Padres in No Man's Land: Canadian Chaplains and the Great War (2nd ed.). Montreal: McGill-Queen's University Press. ISBN 978-1322060460.
- Dancocks, Daniel (1985). Sir Arthur Currie : a biography. Toronto: Methuen. ISBN 0458995606.
- Davidson, Melissa (2016). "Acts of Remembrance: Canadian Great War Memory and the Public Funerals of Sir Arthur Currie and Canon F.G. Scott". Canadian Studies. 80 (80). Association française des études canadiennes: 109–127. doi:10.4000/eccs.688.
- Farr, Don (2007), The Silent General: A Biography of Haig's Trusted Great War Comrade-in-Arms, Solihull: Helion & Company Limited, ISBN 978-1874622994
- Fedunkiw, Marianne (2005). Rockefeller Foundation funding and medical education in Toronto, Montreal and Halifax. Montreal Que: McGill-Queen's University Press. ISBN 0773528970.
- Granatstein, Jack Lawrence (2004). Canada's Army: Waging War and Keeping the Peace. Toronto: University of Toronto Press. ISBN 0802086969.
- Humphries, Mark, ed. (2008). The selected papers of Sir Arthur Currie : diaries, letters and report to the Ministry, 1917–1933. Waterloo, ON: LCMSDS Press of Wilfrid Laurier University. ISBN 978-0978344122.
- Hyatt, A. M. J. (1987). General Sir Arthur Currie : a military biography. Toronto: University of Toronto Press. ISBN 0802026036.
- Neillands, Robin (1998). The Great War Generals on the Western Front. London: Robinson. p. 401. ISBN 1841190632.
- Morton, Desmond (1982). A peculiar kind of politics : Canada's Overseas Ministry in the First World War. Toronto: University of Toronto Press. ISBN 978-0802055866.
- Morton, Desmond (2004). Fight or pay : soldiers' families in the Great War. Vancouver, B.C: UBC Press. ISBN 978-0774811088.
- Nicholson, Gerald W. L. (1962), Canadian Expeditionary Force 1914–1919 (PDF), Official History of the Canadian Army in the First World War, Ottawa: Queen's Printer and Controller of Stationery, OCLC 59609928, archived from the original (PDF) on 26 August 2011
- Pugsley, Christopher (Winter 2006). "Learning from the Canadian Corps on the Western Front". Canadian Military History. 15 (2): 5–32.
- Sharpe, Robert (2009). The last day, the last hour : the Currie libel trial. Toronto: Published for the Osgoode Society for Canadian Legal History by University of Toronto Press. ISBN 978-0802096197.
- Travers, Timothy (April 1989). "Allies in Conflict: The British and Canadian Official Historians and the Real Story of Second Ypres". Journal of Contemporary History. 24 (2): 301–325. doi:10.1177/002200948902400206. S2CID 159578012.
- Urquhart, Hugh M. (1950). Arthur Currie: The biography of a great Canadian. J.M. Dent. ASIN B0007ITPX8.
- Vance, Jonathan (1997). Death so noble : memory, meaning, and the First World War. Vancouver B.C: UBC Press. ISBN 0774806001.
- Winter, Denis (1991). Haig's command : a reassessment. Londona and New York: Viking. ISBN 978-0670802258.

Military offices
New creation	GOC 2nd Canadian Brigade; 1914–1915	Succeeded by Louis Lipsett
Preceded by Sir Edwin Alderson	GOC 1st Canadian Division; 1915–1917	Succeeded by Archie Macdonell
Preceded by Sir Julian Byng	GOC Canadian Corps; 1917–1919	Corps disbanded
Academic offices
Preceded by Auckland Geddes, 1st Baron Geddes	Principal and Vice Chancellor of McGill University; 1920–1933	Succeeded by Arthur Eustace Morgan
Non-profit organization positions
Preceded by Percy Lake	President of the Royal Canadian Legion; 1928–1929	Succeeded by Léo Richer Laflèche
