= 2nd Canadian Division =

Canadian Army formation

2nd Canadian Division 2nd Canadian Infantry Division
- 2^{e} Division du Canada
- 2nd Canadian Infantry Division formation patch
- Active: 1915–1919; 1939–1945; 2013–present
- Country: Canada
- Branch: Canadian Expeditionary Force; Canadian Army
- Type: Reserve division
- Role: Homeland Defence
- Size: Division
- Part of: Canadian Army
- Garrison/HQ: Montreal
- Engagements: First World War; Somme; Vimy Ridge; Passchendaele; 2nd Mons; Second World War; Allied occupation of Iceland; Dieppe Raid; Caen; Verrières Ridge; Cintheaux; Falaise; The Scheldt; Siegfried Line campaign; Operation Veritable; Battle of Groningen

Commanders
- Current commander: Brigadier-général M.C. Harvey,OMM,CD
- Notable commanders: Sam Steele; Richard Turner; Henry Edward Burstall; Victor Odlum; John Hamilton Roberts; Guy Simonds; E. L. M. Burns; Charles Foulkes; Bruce Matthews

The 2nd Canadian Division (2 Cdn Div; French: 2^{e} Division du Canada) is the Canadian Army's Defence of Canada division based in Montreal, Quebec. It is primarily composed of Army Reserve and Canadian Ranger formations and is responsible for domestic operations, homeland defence, and generating scalable force capacity for national emergencies and other contingencies. It also provides augmentation to the Canadian Army's expeditionary and major combat forces.

The division draws its historical lineage from formations that existed during the First and Second World Wars.

== History ==
During the First World War, the division fought on the Western Front before being disbanded in 1919. It was reformed on 1 September 1939, as part of the First Canadian Army, at the outbreak of the Second World War, adopting the designation "2nd Canadian Infantry Division". It was initially composed of volunteers within brigades established along regional lines, though a halt in recruitment in the early months of the war caused a delay in the formation of brigade and divisional headquarters. With questions concerning overseas deployment resolved, the division's respective commands were formed in May and June 1940, and at British Prime Minister Winston Churchill's request, the division was deployed to the United Kingdom between 1 August and 25 December 1940.

Having performed well in training exercises during 1941 and early 1942, elements of the 2nd Division were selected as the main force for Operation Jubilee, a large-scale amphibious raid on the port of Dieppe in German-occupied France. On 19 August 1942, with air and naval gunfire support, the division's 4th and 6th brigades assaulted Dieppe's beaches. The Germans were well prepared and, despite being reinforced, the Canadians sustained heavy losses and had to be evacuated, fewer than half their number returning to the United Kingdom.

Following a period of reconstruction and retraining in 1942–44, the division joined II Canadian Corps as part of the Second British Army for the Allied Invasion of Normandy. 2nd Division saw significant action from 20 July to 21 August in the battles for Caen and Falaise. Joining the newly activated headquarters of the First Canadian Army in the assault on northwestern Europe, the 2nd Canadian Infantry Division played a significant role in the retaking of the Channel ports, the Battle of the Scheldt, and the liberation of the Netherlands. The division was deactivated shortly after the end of the war.

=== First World War ===
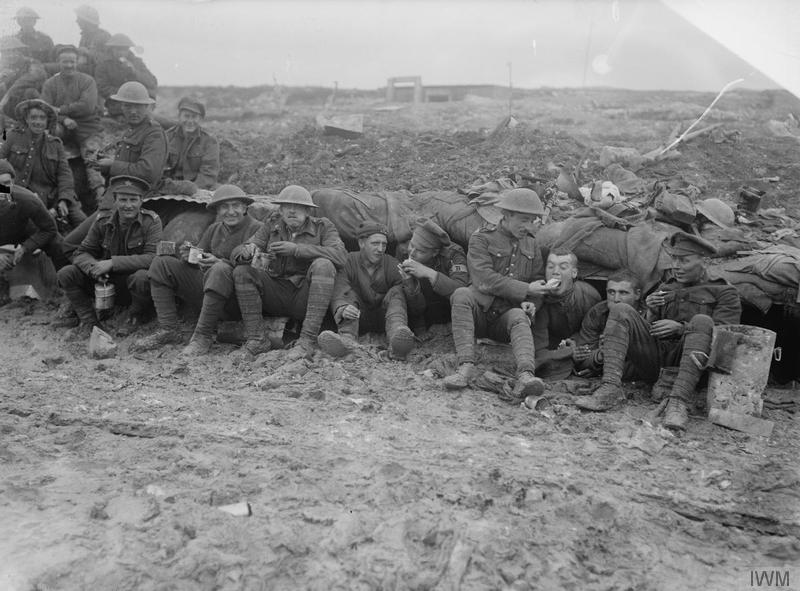
Canadian troops, possibly of the 25th Battalion (Nova Scotia Rifles), eating rations whilst seated on muddy ground outside a shelter near Pozieres, France, during the final stages of the Battle of the Somme, October 1916.

The formation of the 2nd Canadian Division began in May 1915 in Britain, following the arrival of a large contingent of soldiers from Canada. The 2nd Division remained in Great Britain only a short time before embarking for the Western Front in September 1915. It joined the 1st Canadian Division to form the Canadian Corps. The division was under the command of Major General Richard Turner, and its members spent a long and bitterly cold winter in a Belgian section of the front between Ploegsteert Wood and St. Eloi, south of Ypres. The 2nd Canadian Division served on the Western Front until the Armistice of 11 November 1918.

=== Order of battle (1915–1919) ===
==== Infantry units ====
4th Canadian Brigade: (Formed after the original 4th Brigade was dispersed)

- 18th (Western Ontario) Battalion Canadian Infantry. 1 October 1914 – 11 November 1918;
- 19th (Central Ontario) Battalion Canadian Infantry. 19 October 1914 – 11 November 1918;
- 20th (Central Ontario) Battalion Canadian Infantry. October 1914 – 11 November 1918;
- 21st (Eastern Ontario) Battalion Canadian Infantry. 19 October 1914 – 11 November 1918.

5th Canadian Brigade:

- 22nd (Canadien Francais) Battalion Canadian Infantry. 21 October 1914 – 11 November 1918;
- 24th (Victoria Rifles) Battalion Canadian Infantry. 22 October 1914 – 11 November 1918;
- 25th (Nova Scotia) Battalion Canadian Infantry. 28 October 1914 – 11 November 1918;
- 26th (New Brunswick) Battalion Canadian Infantry. 2 November 1914 – 11 November 1918.

6th Canadian Brigade

- 27th (City of Winnipeg) Battalion Canadian Infantry. 21 October 1914 – 11 November 1918;
- 28th (North West) Battalion Canadian Infantry. 19 October 1914 – 11 November 1918;
- 29th (Vancouver) Battalion Canadian Infantry. 24 October 1914 – 11 November 1918;
- 31st (Alberta) Battalion Canadian Infantry. 16 November 1914 – 11 November 1918.

Pioneers:

- 2nd Canadian Pioneer Battalion. March 1916 – June 1917. To the 2nd Canadian Engineer Brigade.

=== Battles and engagements on the Western Front ===
Year	Battle/engagement	Date(s)
1916	Actions of St. Eloi Craters	27 March – 16 April
1916	Battle of Mount Sorrel	2–13 June
1916	Battle of Flers-Courcelette	15–22 September
1916	Battle of Thiepval	26–28 September
1916	Battle of Le Transloy	1–18 October
1916	Battle of the Ancre Heights	1 October – 11 November
1917	Battle of Vimy Ridge	9–14 April
1917	Attack on La Coulotte	23 April
1917	Battle of Arleux	28–29 April
1917	Third Battle of the Scarpe	3–4 May
1917	Battle of Hill 70	15–25 August
1917	Second Battle of Passchendaele	26 October – 10 November
1917	Battle of Cambrai (1917)	20 November – 3 December
1918	First Battle of Arras	28 March
1918	Battle of Amiens	8–11 August
1918	Actions round Damery	15–17 August
1918	Battle of the Scarpe	26–30 August
1918	The Pursuit to the Selle	9–12 October
1918	Passage of the Grande Honnelle	5–7 November

=== Second World War ===
==== Formation and early organization (1939) ====
At the start of the Second World War, the Canadian Active Service Force was initially composed of two divisions; the 1st and 2nd Canadian Infantry Divisions, both raised on the first of September 1939. The fighting power of this force lay in its constituent infantry brigades, of which each division had three. These were in turn composed of three rifle and one machine gun battalion, with additional divisional artillery and engineer units in support.

The 2nd Division, like its sister formation, was originally organized along regional lines. Its 4th Brigade was composed of regiments from Ontario, the 5th Brigade of regiments from Quebec, and 6th Brigade of regiments from Western Canada.

2nd Canadian Infantry Division, 1939
Unit	Region
4th Canadian Infantry Brigade
The Royal Regiment of Canada	Toronto, Ontario
The Royal Hamilton Light Infantry (Wentworth Regiment)	Hamilton, Ontario
The Essex Scottish Regiment	Windsor, Ontario
The Cameron Highlanders of Ottawa (machine gun)	Ottawa, Ontario
5th Canadian Infantry Brigade
The Black Watch (Royal Highland Regiment) of Canada	Montreal, Quebec
Les Fusiliers Mont-Royal	Montreal, Quebec
Le Régiment de Maisonneuve	Montreal, Quebec
Le Régiment de la Chaudière (machine gun)	Levis, Quebec
6th Canadian Infantry Brigade
The Queen's Own Cameron Highlanders of Canada	Winnipeg, Manitoba
The South Saskatchewan Regiment	Estevan, Saskatchewan
The Calgary Highlanders	Calgary, Alberta
The Winnipeg Grenadiers (machine gun)	Winnipeg, Manitoba

==== Garrison duties and reorganization (1940) ====
It was over a year before the 2nd Division came together as a cohesive unit and, during the interim period between formation and arrival in the United Kingdom, many changes to its organization were made. The first brigade concentrations took place in May and June 1940, until which time all units had trained in their own garrisons. The 4th Brigade assembled at Camp Borden in Ontario, the 5th at Valcartier Camp in Quebec, and the 6th at Camp Shilo in Manitoba. The divisional artillery was concentrated at Camp Petawawa in Ontario, and at Shilo.

The 2nd Division's structure was altered in early 1940, reducing its number of machine-gun battalions from three to one. The Camerons and the Chaudières (now a rifle battalion) were reassigned to the newly mobilized 3rd Canadian Infantry Division, and the Winnipeg Grenadiers were sent to Jamaica for garrison duty, after which they returned to Canada then redeployed to Hong Kong, where they were captured when it fell to the Japanese on 25 December 1941.

In May 1940, The Black Watch were moved from Valcartier to Newfoundland, and in June, the 2nd Division was earmarked for garrison duty by the forces of the British Commonwealth, with the Royal Regiment of Canada and Les Fusiliers Mont Royal arriving in Iceland later that month. However, at the request of Winston Churchill these deployments were cut short, as the division was badly needed in England to supplement the British Army—then facing the imminent possibility of German invasion.

As a result, most of the 2nd Division's units were sent to the United Kingdom in August 1940, although the Iceland garrison remained in place until 31 October. The absence of the Mont Royals allowed Major-General Victor Odlum to reassign the Calgary Highlanders to the 5th Brigade in September, in an attempt to ethnically mix the brigades of the division.

==== Training in the United Kingdom (1941) ====
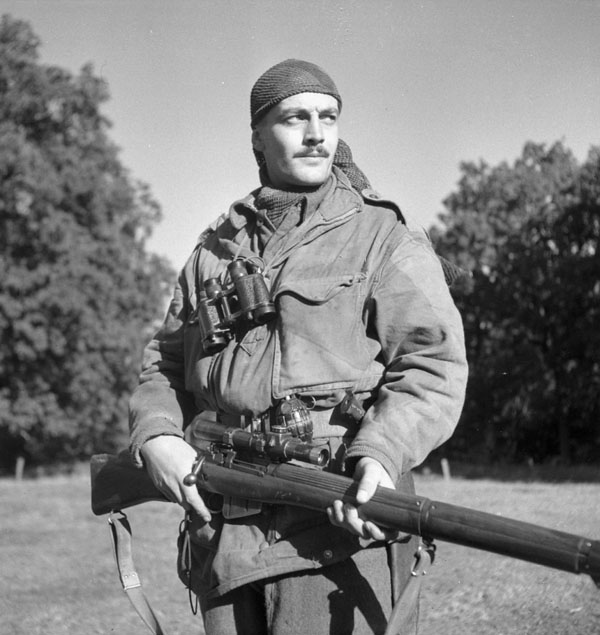
Sgt. Harold Marshall of the Calgary Highlanders' Sniper Platoon

In 1941, the Toronto Scottish Regiment was transferred from the 1st Division to become the machine-gun battalion of the 2nd Division. Around the same time, the 8th Reconnaissance Regiment (14th Canadian Hussars) was raised from 2nd Division personnel supplemented by reinforcements from Canada. Due to equipment shortages, it was often difficult to adequately supply newly arrived divisions in England. Artillery units had to make use of outmoded 75 mm guns with steel tires, and a lack of anti-aircraft guns—diverted to civil defense during the height of the Battle of Britain—left Canadian units to fend for themselves with small arms. However, by February 1941, enough Bren guns had been issued to the infantry units and, by September, the artillery had been equipped with 25-pounder (84 mm, 3.3-in) howitzers, although signals equipment and transport were still lacking and anti-tank guns were dangerously scarce.

When the division was not engaged in coastal-defence duties or unit training, formation-level training took the form of increasingly larger exercises. Exercise Waterloo, conducted from 14 to 16 June 1941, was the largest in the United Kingdom to date, with I Canadian Corps counter-attacking an imagined German sea and air landing. Exercise Bumper, held from 29 September to 3 October, was larger still, involving 250,000 men. These exercises tended to concentrate on traffic control, communications, and logistical concerns, and were of little practical value to the infantry.

On 30 December 1941, the Calgary Highlanders introduced "battle drill" to the division. This new type of training emphasized small unit tactics as well as "hardening" training through use of live ammunition, slaughterhouse visits, and obstacle courses, and was adopted throughout Commonwealth forces stationed in Britain.

==== Operation Jubilee (1942) ====
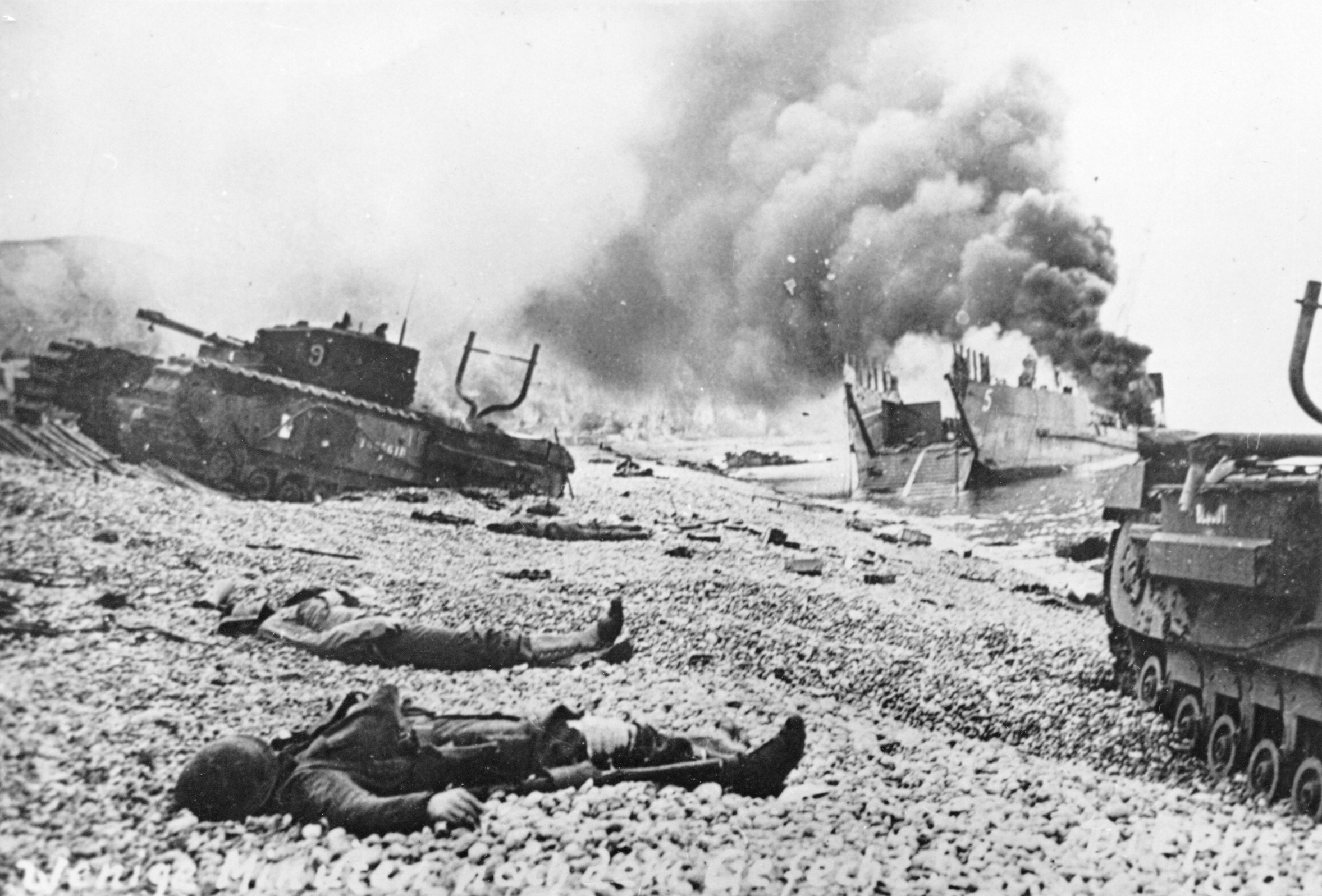
Soldiers' corpses from the 2nd Canadian Infantry Division following the Dieppe Raid

In early 1942, under Major General J. H. Roberts, the 2nd Canadian Infantry Division participated in several additional full-scale combat exercises, again gauging the ability of Commonwealth divisions to repel a possible German invasion. As April and May progressed, the exercises intensified, becoming significantly more demanding on the participants. As a result, the 2nd Division was judged to be one of the four best divisions in the United Kingdom, and was selected as the primary force for the upcoming Allied attack on the German-occupied port of Dieppe—codenamed Operation Jubilee. Mounted as a test of whether or not such a landing was feasible, the Dieppe raid was to be undertaken by the 4th and 6th Brigades, with additional naval, air, and infantry support. Significant elements of the 5th Brigade were also involved.

On 19 August 1942, while British commando units attacked bunker positions on the outskirts of Dieppe, forces of the 2nd Division landed on four beaches. The easternmost, Blue Beach, which was at the foot of a sheer cliff, presented the most difficulties; the Royal Regiment of Canada, with a company of the Black Watch, was held at bay by two platoons of German defenders. Only six percent of the men that landed on Blue Beach returned to Britain.

The main beaches, codenamed White and Red, lay in front of Dieppe itself. Making only minor gains, the majority of the 4th and 6th brigades became pinned down on the beach, and despite the arrival of an armoured squadron from the 14th Army Tank Regiment (The Calgary Regiment (Tank)), casualties were heavy. Reinforcements from the Mont Royals had little effect, and surviving forces were withdrawn by 11:00. Of the nearly 5,000 Canadian troops that participated, more than half were killed, wounded or captured.

At Green Beach to the west, part of the South Saskatchewan Regiment was landed on the wrong side of the Scie River, necessitating an assault over the machine gun swept bridge there so they could assault the cliffs on the west. The village of Pourville was captured but the eastern cliffs proved impossible to capture so blocking their assault on an artillery battery and a radar station. The Queen's Own Cameron Highlanders were landed with the objective of moving south to attack an airfield and a divisional HQ. Neither battalion was able to achieve their objectives. As with the other three beaches, casualties among the Canadians were high with 160 fatalities.

==== Rebuilding (1942–1944) ====
Throughout 1943, the 2nd Division focused on rebuilding its ranks, having lost close to half its strength at Dieppe. General Roberts remained in command of the division until an unsatisfactory handling of the division in an army-level scheme caused his ouster. In January 1944, Major General Charles Foulkes—the first to command the division who had not served in the First World War—replaced Burns. The following month, all three brigade commanders were replaced as part of a general move to modernize the Canadian forces' higher echelons; further sweeping changes throughout all levels of command, coupled with the lingering effects of the large influx of new personnel during 1943, lowered morale in the division. However, in March 1944, training again intensified, heralding the coming invasion of Europe. On 9 March, the 2nd Division was inspected by King George VI, and by May the division numbered close to 18,000 fully equipped and trained soldiers. When D-Day arrived on 6 June 1944, the main Canadian assault was led by the 3rd Canadian Infantry Division, while the 2nd Division was held in reserve.

2nd Canadian Infantry Division, 1944
4th Canadian Infantry Brigade
The Royal Regiment of Canada
The Royal Hamilton Light Infantry (Wentworth Regiment)
The Essex Scottish Regiment
4th Infantry Brigade Ground Defence Platoon (Lorne Scots)
5th Canadian Infantry Brigade
The Black Watch (Royal Highland Regiment) of Canada
Le Régiment de Maisonneuve
The Calgary Highlanders
5th Infantry Brigade Ground Defence Platoon (Lorne Scots)
6th Canadian Infantry Brigade
The Queen's Own Cameron Highlanders of Canada
The South Saskatchewan Regiment
Les Fusiliers Mont-Royal
6th Infantry Brigade Ground Defence Platoon (Lorne Scots)
Support units
The Toronto Scottish Regiment (machine gun)
8th Reconnaissance Regiment (14th Canadian Hussars) (8 Recce)
Royal Canadian Artillery
Headquarters
4th Field Regiment, 2nd (Ottawa) Field Battery, 14th (Midland) Field Battery, 26th (Lambton) Field Battery, 5th Field Regiment, 5th (Westmount) Field Battery, 28th (Newcastle) Field Battery, 73rd Field Battery, 6th Field Regiment, 13th (Winnipeg) Field Battery, 21st Field Battery, 91st Field Battery
2nd Anti-Tank Regiment, 18th Anti-Tank Battery, 20th Anti-Tank Battery, 23rd Anti-Tank Battery, 108th Anti-Tank Battery, 3rd Light Anti-Aircraft Regiment, 16th Light Anti-Aircraft Battery, 17th Light Anti-Aircraft Battery, 38th Light Anti-Aircraft Battery
Corps of Royal Canadian Engineers
Headquarters
1st Field Park Company, 2nd Field Company, 7th Field Company, 11th Field Company, one bridging platoon
Royal Canadian Corps of Signals
2nd Canadian Divisional Signals
Royal Canadian Army Service Corps
Headquarters
4th Infantry Brigade Company, 5th Infantry Brigade Company, 6th Infantry Brigade Company, Second Infantry Divisional Troops Company
Royal Canadian Army Medical Corps
No. 10 Field Ambulance, No. 11 Field Ambulance, No. 18 Field Ambulance, 13th Canadian Field Hygiene Section, 4th Canadian Field Dressing Station, 21st Canadian Field Dressing Station
Royal Canadian Ordnance Corps
No. 2 Infantry Division Ordnance Field Park
Royal Canadian Electrical and Mechanical Engineers
Headquarters
4th Infantry Brigade Workshop, 5th Infantry Brigade Workshop, 6th Infantry Brigade Workshop, one LAA workshop
Eleven light aid detachments.
Canadian Provost Corps
No. 2 Provost Company

==== Battle of Normandy ====
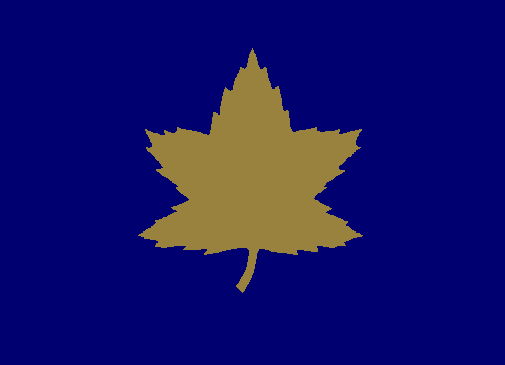
Formation sign used to identify vehicles of the 2nd Canadian Infantry Division

The Canadian attack of the Juno beach was the most successful of the five beaches attacked on D-day. Having successfully landed in Normandy, Allied forces soon became embroiled in battles against German armour and were unable to significantly expand their beachhead; by the time the 2nd Division came ashore at the end of the first week of July, the entire front had congealed. As the division assembled its brigades for combat, Anglo-Canadian forces launched Operation Charnwood. It was a tactical success, but could not clear all Caen of its German defenders. Although originally a D-Day objective, Caen proved a difficult prize, holding out until 19 July when it finally fell to British forces during Operation Goodwood. In the aftermath, Field Marshal Bernard Montgomery ordered elements of II Canadian Corps to push forward towards Verrières Ridge, the dominant geographical feature between Caen and Falaise. By keeping up the pressure, Montgomery hoped to divert German attention away from the American sector to the west.

===== Operation Atlantic =====
Operation Atlantic, launched on 18 July alongside Goodwood, had the objectives of securing the western bank of the Orne River and Verrières Ridge. 2nd Division's 5th and 6th brigades were selected as the assaulting forces, with the 5th Brigade focusing on the Orne and the 6th on Verrières. The 4th Brigade were tasked with securing the flank of the operation, and The Royal Regiment of Canada attacked Louvigny on 18 July. Early on 19 July, The Calgary Highlanders seized Point 67, directly north of Verrières Ridge, and the following morning the Royal Highland Regiment of Canada crossed the Orne River and secured the flanks of the advance. In the afternoon, the 6th Brigade's South Saskatchewan Regiment attacked the well-entrenched German positions on the ridge, with support from Typhoon fighter-bombers and tanks. However, the attack ran into torrential rain, and the Germans counterattacked in force. This and further German attacks inflicted heavy casualties on the South Saskatchewan Regiment and its supporting battalions, The Essex Scottish Regiment and The Queen's Own Cameron Highlanders. On 21 July, the 5th Canadian Infantry Brigade reinforced Canadian positions on Point 67. In two days of fighting, the division suffered 1,349 casualties.

===== Operation Spring =====
On 22 July 1944, Montgomery elected to use the Anglo-Canadian forces south of Caen in an all-out offensive aimed at breaking the German defensive cordon keeping his forces bottled up in Normandy. To meet Montgomery's objectives, Canadian General Guy Simonds, commander of II Canadian Corps, was ordered to design a large breakout assault, codenamed Operation Spring. The attack was planned in three tightly timed phases of advance, pitting two Canadian and two British divisions against three German SS-Panzer divisions. It would be launched in conjunction with an American offensive, Operation Cobra, scheduled to take place on 25 July 1944.

The 4th Brigade attacked in the east with some success, taking Verrières village itself, but were repulsed at Tilly-la-Campagne by German counterattacks. The 5th Brigade, in the centre, made a bid for Fontenay-le-Marmion; of the 325 members of the Black Watch who left the start-lines, only 15 answered evening roll-call. German counterattacks on 26 and 27 July pushed Canadian forces back to Point 67. However, the situation eventually eased as the planned American offensive got underway. Throughout the first week of August, significant German resources were transferred from the Anglo-Canadian front to that of the Third United States Army, while reinforcements moved from Pas de Calais to the Falaise, Calvados area. By 7 August 1944, only one major formation—the 12th SS Panzer Division—faced Canadian forces on Verrières Ridge.

===== Operation "Totalize" =====
By 1 August 1944, the British had made significant gains on the Vire and Orne Rivers during Operation Bluecoat, while the Americans had achieved a complete breakthrough in the west. On 4 August, Simonds and General Harry Crerar—the newly appointed commander of the First Canadian Army—were given the order to prepare an advance on Falaise. Three days later, with heavy bomber support, Operation Totalize began, marking the first use of Kangaroo Armoured Personnel Carriers. While the 3rd Canadian Infantry Division attacked east of the Caen-Falaise Road, 2nd Division attacked to the west. By noon Verrières Ridge had finally fallen, and Canadian and Polish armour was preparing to exploit south towards Falaise. However, strong resistance by the 12th SS Panzer Division and the 272nd Volksgrenadier Division halted the advance. Although 12 km (7.5 mi) of ground had been gained, Canadian forces had failed to reach Falaise itself.

Simultaneously, the Germans had launched a desperate and ill-prepared armoured thrust towards Mortain, beginning on 6 August 1944. This was halted within a day and, despite the increasingly dangerous threat presented by the Anglo-Canadian advance on Falaise, German commander Field Marshal Günther von Kluge was prohibited by Adolf Hitler from redeploying his forces. Thus, as American armoured formations advanced towards Argentan from the south, the Allies were presented with an opportunity to encircle large sections of the German Seventh Army. The First Canadian Army was ordered south, while the Americans prepared to move on Chambois on 14 August. Simonds and Crerar quickly planned a further offensive that would push through to Falaise, trapping the German Seventh Army in Normandy.

===== Operation Tractable =====
On 14 August, the First Canadian Army launched Operation Tractable with the aim of capturing Falaise and achieving a linkup with American forces in Chambois. A daylight attack was executed after artillery provided smoke-screen cover and medium bombers softened up the German defenses. The offensive was largely successful and, although the 2nd Division was not an active participant, divisional troops entered Falaise on 16 August as the remainder of First Canadian Army moved south-east towards Trun and Chambois. By 21 August the remnants of the battered German Seventh Army had surrendered in the Falaise Pocket, bringing the Battle of Normandy to a close. The German forces committed to Normandy since D-Day had been virtually annihilated—by the end of Operation Tractable, the 12th SS Panzer Division, the main adversary of the Canadians, had lost 80% of its tanks, 70% of its personnel carriers, and 60% of its artillery.

Shortly afterwards, the 2nd Division moved to Foret de la Londe, along the valley of the River Seine. From 27 to 29 August, the 4th and 6th Brigades were engaged in heavy fighting against the rearguard of German forces seeking to withdraw across the Seine.

==== Channel Ports and the Scheldt ====
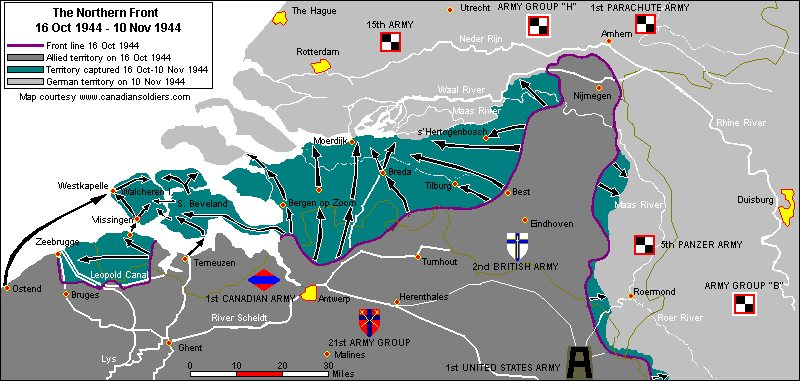
Canadian movements during the Battle of the Scheldt, October 1944

Throughout September and October 1944, the First Canadian Army moved along the coast of France with the aim of securing the Channel ports. On 1 September, while the 3rd Division made for Boulogne and Calais, the 2nd Division entered Dieppe, encountering virtually no resistance. Five days later they were tasked by Montgomery and Crerar with retaking Dunkirk. Heavy fighting around the outskirts would hold the division for several days but, by 9 September, 5th Brigade had captured the port. The Dunkirk perimeter was handed over to the British on 15 September, and the 2nd Division made for Antwerp.

Although the Belgian White Brigade and elements of the 3rd British Division had entered Antwerp as early as 6 September, taking the city and docks, a strategic oversight meant that the nearby bridges over the Albert Canal were not seized, leaving the Germans in control of the Scheldt estuary. The failure to make an immediate push on the estuary ensured the strategically vital port would remain useless until the Scheldt was cleared. Strong formations of the Fifteenth German Army, which had withdrawn from the Pas de Calais, were able to consolidate their positions on the islands of South Beveland and Walcheren, as well as the Albert Canal directly northwest of Antwerp, and were further reinforced by elements of General Kurt Student's First Parachute Army.

During the initial phases of the battle, the 2nd Canadian Infantry Division sought to force a crossing of the Albert Canal. On 2 October, the entire First Canadian Army—under the temporary command of General Simonds—moved against the German defenses. Two days later, 2nd Division had cleared the canal, and was moving northwest towards South Beveland and Walcheren Island. On Friday, 13 October, later known as "Black Friday", 5th Brigade's Black Watch attacked positions near the coast, losing all four company commanders and over 200 men. Three days later, the Calgary Highlanders conducted a more successful offensive, capturing the initial objective of Woensdrecht. Simultaneously, the 3rd Canadian Infantry Division and the 4th Canadian Armoured Division captured Bergen, cutting off South Beveland and Walcheren from reinforcement.

==== Battles for the Rhine (November 1944 – March 1945) ====
By November 1944, the First Canadian Army had entered the Nijmegen Salient which was being held for use in the development of future offensives. The 2nd Division came under the command of Major-General A.B. Matthews, with Foulkes being transferred to command I Canadian Corps. The First Canadian Army launched no major offensive operations from November 1944 – January 1945; the longest hiatus the Canadians had enjoyed since landing on the Normandy beaches the previous June.

Operation Veritable was designed to bring the 21st Army Group to the west bank of the Rhine River, the last natural obstacle before entering Germany. Initially scheduled for December 1944, the operation was delayed until February by the German Ardennes Offensive. Plans were developed to breach three successive defensive lines: the outpost screen; a formidable section of the Siegfried Line running through the Hochwald Forest; and finally the Hochwald Layback covering the approach to the ultimate objective of Xanten. The first phase began on 8 February 1945, with the 2nd Division's advance following up one of the largest artillery barrages seen on the Western Front. The Germans had prepared significant defenses in depth, both within the outpost screen and the Siegfried Line itself, and to add to the Canadians' difficulties, constant rain and cold weather obscured the battlefield. However, by the end of the first day, the 2nd Division had captured their objectives—the fortified towns of Wyler and Den Heuvel. On 11 February, the division moved southeast to assist XXX British Corps in their assault on Moyland Wood.

The operational plan's second phase called for the 2nd and 3rd Divisions to take the Hochwald Forest. Following its capture, the 4th Canadian Armoured would sweep through the Hochwald Gap towards Wesel, followed by 2nd Division "leap-frogging" towards Xanten. Operation Blockbuster was scheduled for 27 February, but despite initial gains, stubborn German resistance prolonged the battle for six days. It was not until 3 March that the forest was cleared—during the intense close-quarter fighting, Major Frederick Tilston of the Essex Scottish Regiment won a Victoria Cross.

Operation Blockbuster's final phase was the attack on Xanten itself, which lasted from 8–10 March. This fell primarily to the 2nd Division and 2nd Canadian (Armoured) Brigade, although the 43rd Wessex Division was temporarily assigned to Simonds's II Canadian Corps for the assault. Despite an elaborate preceding artillery barrage, dogged German resistance caused the battle to degenerate into one of attrition. Because effective air-support was prevented by fog and movement was hindered by German mortar barrages, the Anglo-Canadians suffered heavy casualties. However, by 10 March, the 2nd Division's 5th Brigade had linked up with elements of the 52nd Lowland Division, bringing the offensive to a close. Total Canadian casualties during Veritable and Blockbuster were 5,304 killed or wounded.

==== North of the Rhine (March – May 1945) ====
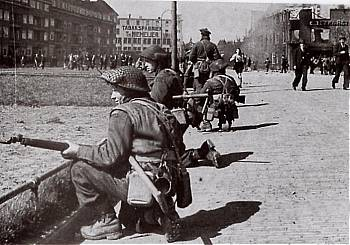
Canadian troops at Groningen

Canadian forces having incurred heavy casualties in clearing a path to the Rhine, the 2nd Division was rested from the massive crossing operation that took place on 23 March 1945, instead crossing in relative ease a week later. After a brief detour through German territory, the First Canadian Army—now unified with the arrival of I Canadian Corps from Italy—prepared to assault German positions in the Netherlands. The 2nd Division moved northwards towards Groningen. In the nine days preceding their attack, German resistance had been light and uncoordinated but opposition stiffened as the assault progressed, leading to heavy losses among the battalions of the 5th Brigade. By 13 April, the division had been shifted eastward to guard the flanks of a British assault on Bremen, and the following day I Canadian Corps liberated Arnhem. On 2 May, the 2nd Division took Oldenburg, solidifying Canadian positions throughout the Netherlands. German and Canadian forces declared a ceasefire on 5 May, and all fighting came to an end with the surrender of German forces in Western Europe on 7 May 1945. In October 1945, after four months in the Netherlands, General Order 52/46 officially disbanded the headquarters of the 2nd Canadian Infantry Division. By December, the entirety of the division had been stood down and returned to Canada.

==== Commanding Officers ====
Date	General Officer Commanding
20 May 1940 – 6 Nov 1941	Major-General V.W. Odlum
7 Nov 1941 – 12 Apr 1943	Major-General J.H. Roberts (acting commander 7 Nov 1941 – 6 Apr 1941)
23 Dec 1941 – 5 Apr 1942	Major-General H.D.G. Crerar (Never actually commanded; appointed to temporary command of I Cdn Corps 23 Dec 1941)
13 Apr 1943 – 28 Apr 1943	Major-General G.G. Simonds
6 May 1943 – 10 Jan 1944	Major-General E.L.M. Burns
11 Jan 1944 – 9 Nov 1944	General C. Foulkes
10 Nov 1944 – 6 Oct 1945	Major-General A.B. Matthews
6 Oct 1945	Division disbanded

=== Peacetime operations ===
==== Operation ELEMENT ====
Operation ELEMENT represented the Canadian Armed Forces (CAF) response to the influx of irregular immigrants crossing into Canada from the United States. The operation was supported through a whole-of-government approach.

Beginning at the end of July 2017, the Canada Border Services Agency (CBSA) and the Royal Canadian Mounted Police (RCMP) were using considerable amounts of resources to manage the significant increase in irregular immigrants seeking asylum crossing the Canadian border from the United States. To aid civil authorities manage this situation, the CAF deployed approximately 370 troops to build and maintain temporary accommodations at two sites: one at Saint-Bernard-de-Lacolle, Quebec, and one at the Nav Canada facility in Cornwall, Ontario.

The mission was called to an end by the Canadian government on 1 December 2017, and ended on 12 December 2017.

==== Operation LENTUS ====
Operation LENTUS is the ongoing Canadian Armed Forces (CAF) response to domestic natural disasters. In the event that provincial and territorial authorities, the first responders to major natural disasters, are unable to deal with the resulting damage on their own, they may ask the CAF for help. LENTUS follows established action plans, adaptable to multiple situation, in order to provide support to populations in crisis. The objectives of the CAF during this type of operation is threefold: to provide aid to civil authorities, to respond to the call to action swiftly and efficiently, and to stabilize natural disaster conditions.

On 5 May 2017, severe flooding in the Province of Quebec led to the provincial government requesting aid from the CAF. From 6 May – 5 June 2017, the CAF provided support to Quebec's flood relief efforts by mobilizing 2600 CAF members, 400 vehicles, six CH-146 Griffon helicopters, one CH-147 Chinook helicopter, one Halifax-class frigate (HMCS Montréal), and 15 small boats. The CAF operated in five affected regions during this period: Trois-Rivières, Montréal, Mauricie, Outaouais, and Montérégie.

==== Operation CADENCE ====
Operation CADENCE represents the Canadian Armed Forces (CAF) support of the Royal Canadian Mounted Police (RCMP) security efforts for major domestic events, including key conferences like the 44th G7 summit.

During this summit from 8 to 9 June 2018 in Charlevoix, Que., the CAF provided planning and air support to the RCMP; conducted monitoring operations by air, land, and sea; and aided civil authorities in maintaining the security of controlled airspace. Over 2000 members, both Reserve and Regular Force, comprised the task force charged with these responsibilities.

== Organization ==
The division is headquartered in Montreal and commands the Canadian Army's Canadian Brigade Groups (CBGs) and Canadian Ranger formations, along with other forces assigned to its domestic defence mission. Its organization includes formations and capabilities dedicated to domestic operations, territorial defence, and support to Canadian Armed Forces operations across Canada.

Division structure in 2026

Canadian Brigade Groups

- 31 Canadian Brigade Group (31 CBG)
- 32 Canadian Brigade Group (32 CBG)
- 33 Canadian Brigade Group (33 CBG)
- 34 Canadian Brigade Group (34 CBG)
- 35 Canadian Brigade Group (35 CBG)
- 36 Canadian Brigade Group (36 CBG)
- 37 Canadian Brigade Group (37 CBG)
- 38 Canadian Brigade Group (38 CBG)
- 39 Canadian Brigade Group (39 CBG)
- 41 Canadian Brigade Group (41 CBG)

Canadian Ranger Patrol Groups

- 1st Canadian Ranger Patrol Group (1 CRPG)
- 2nd Canadian Ranger Patrol Group (2 CRPG)
- 3rd Canadian Ranger Patrol Group (3 CRPG)
- 4th Canadian Ranger Patrol Group (4 CRPG)
- 5th Canadian Ranger Patrol Group (5 CRPG)

== See also ==
- Military history of Canada during the Second World War
- Military history of Canada
- Canadian Forces
