= Semper paratus =

Latin motto meaning "always ready"

"SEMPER PARATUS" inscribed on the official flag of the U.S. Coast Guard

Semper Paratus is a Latin phrase, meaning "Always Ready". Sometimes shortened to Semper P. It is used as the official motto of some organizations, such as the United States Coast Guard. A 1928 march of the same name is also used as the U.S. Coast Guard's official march, and the phrase appears on the organization's flag.

== Usage ==
=== Canada ===
- Semper Paratus is the motto of The Royal Hamilton Light Infantry (Wentworth Regiment) of the Canadian Army formed in 1862 and headquartered at the James Street Armoury in Hamilton, Ontario, Canada.
- Semper Paratus is the motto of The Brockville Rifles a Primary Reserve infantry regiment of the Canadian Army formed 5 October 1866 and headquartered at the Brockville Armoury in Brockville, Ontario, Canada.
- Semper Paratus is the motto of the Essex and Kent Scottish of the Canadian Army formed in 1954 through the amalgamation of The Essex Scottish Regiment and The Kent Regiment.

=== Hong Kong ===
- Semper Paratus is the motto of Royal Hong Kong Auxiliary Air Force, it is also used by Hong Kong Government Flying Service.

=== United Kingdom ===
- Semper Paratus is the motto used by numerous armigers, including the Barons Clifford of Chudleigh, Armytage baronets, of Kirklees, Yorkshire, and Elphinstone baronets, of Sowerby, Cumberland.
- It is also the family motto of the family Upton and has been used since the 11th Century.

=== United States ===
- Semper Paratus is the motto of the United States Coast Guard, and is the title of their marching song "Semper Paratus".
- It is the motto of the U.S. Army 16th Infantry Regiment, Fort Riley, Kansas.
- It is the motto of the 9th Reconnaissance Wing, a United States Air Force unit assigned to the Air Combat Command and Sixteenth Air Force, stationed at Beale Air Force Base.
- It was the motto of the United States Navy destroyer tender USS Sierra (AD-18).
- It is the motto of the Long Beach (California) Fire Department.
- It is the motto of the Functional Reserve Militia of Idaho.

== Bibliography ==
- Canadian Forces Publication A-DH-267-003 Insignia and Lineages of the Canadian Forces. Volume 3: Combat Arms Regiments
- "Semper Paratus (Always Ready)". History, Heritage & Traditions. U.S. Coast Guard Historian's Office.
- "Special Unit Designations". United States Army Center of Military History. 2010-04-21. Archived from the original on 2010-06-09.
