= Essex Scottish Regiment =

Canadian Army infantry regiment, 1885–1954

The Essex Scottish Regiment
- Active: 1885–1954
- Country: Canada
- Branch: Canadian Militia (1885-1940); Canadian Army (1940-1954)
- Type: Line infantry
- Role: Infantry
- Size: One battalion
- Part of: Non-Permanent Active Militia (1885-1940); Royal Canadian Infantry Corps (1942-1954)
- Garrison/HQ: Windsor, Ontario
- Motto: Semper paratus 'always ready'
- Colors: Facing colour blue
- March: Quick: "Highland Laddie"
- Engagements: First World War; Second World War

Insignia
- Tartan: MacGregor

The Essex Scottish was an infantry regiment of the Canadian Army until 1954.

== History ==
Founded in 1885 as the 21st Essex Battalion of Infantry, it went through several name changes including: 1887 - 21st Battalion, Essex Fusiliers; 1900 - 21st Regiment, Essex Fusiliers; 1920 - The Essex Fusiliers, acquiring its present title in 1927.

During World War II the regiment was among the first Canadian units to see combat in the European theatre during the invasion of Dieppe. By the end of The Dieppe Raid, the Essex Scottish Regiment had suffered 121 fatal casualties, with many others wounded and captured. The Essex Scottish later participated in Operation Atlantic and was slaughtered attempting to take Verrières Ridge on July 21. By the war's end, the Essex Scottish Regiment had suffered over 550 war dead; its 2,500 casualties were the most of any unit in the Canadian army during the Second World War.

In 1954, as a result of the Kennedy Report on the Reserve Army, this regiment was amalgamated with The Kent Regiment to form The Essex and Kent Scottish Regiment.

The Essex Scottish before amalgamation held its final order of precedence as 40.

== Alliances and uniform ==
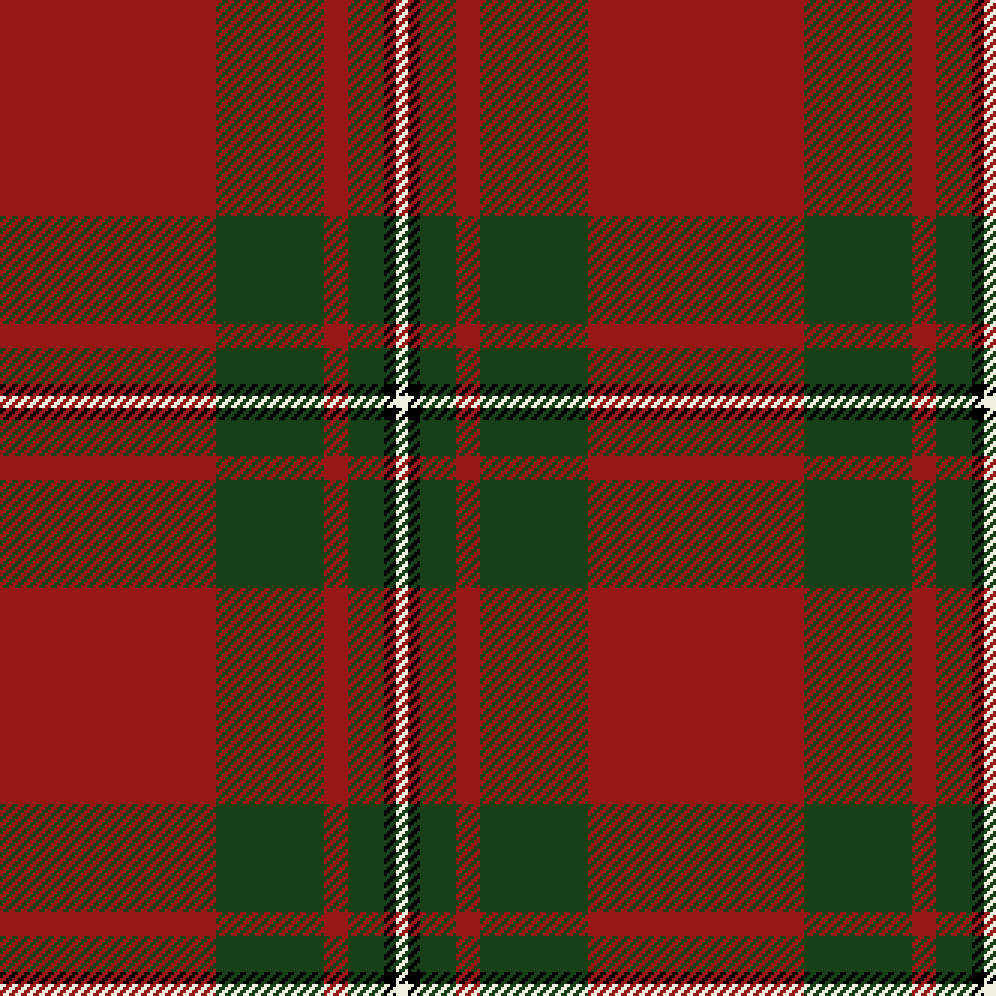
Clan Gregor tartan

The Essex Scottish were allied to The Essex Regiment and were kitted with a balmoral with red and white diced border, scarlet doublet, white sporran with two black points, red and black hose, spats with black buttons, blue shoulder straps with white cross stripes and piping with full dress only for pipers and drummers, who also wore a feather bonnet with white hackle. They wore the red and green tartan of Clan Gregor.

== Perpetuations ==
The regiment perpetuated the following units of the Canadian Expeditionary Force:

=== Great War ===
- 18th Battalion (Western Ontario), CEF
- 99th Battalion (Essex), CEF
- 241st (Canadian Scottish Borderers) Battalion, CEF

== Battle honours ==
=== First World War ===
- Ypres, 1915, '17
- Festubert, 1915
- Mount Sorrel
- Somme, 1916, '18
- Flers-Courcelette
- Thiepval
- Ancre Heights
- Arras, 1917, '18
- Vimy, 1917
- Hill 70
- Passchendaele
- Amiens
- Scarpe, 1918
- Hindenburg Line
- Canal du Nord
- Cambrai, 1918
- Pursuit to Mons
- France and Flanders 1915–18

=== Second World War ===
- Dieppe Raid (1942)
- Battle of Verrières Ridge (1944)
- liberation of Dieppe (1944)
- Battle of the Scheldt (1944)
- The Rhine (1944–1945)
- Northwestern Europe

== Victoria Cross and George Cross recipients ==
- Major Frederick Albert Tilston VC, Gazetted on 22 May 1945.

== See also ==
- Canadian-Scottish regiment
