= 8th Reconnaissance Regiment =

8th Reconnaissance Regiment may refer to:

- 8th Reconnaissance Regiment (14th Canadian Hussars)
- 8th Reconnaissance Regiment (Australia)
