= Essex and Kent Scottish =

Military unit of the Canadian Army

The Essex and Kent Scottish
- Regimental badge
- Active: 12 June 1885–present
- Country: Canada
- Branch: Canadian Army
- Type: Infantry (Lowland)
- Role: Light infantry
- Size: One battalion
- Part of: 31 Canadian Brigade Group
- Garrison/HQ: Windsor, Ontario
- Nickname: "The Detroit Scottish"
- Motto: Semper paratus (Latin for 'always ready')
- March: "Highland Laddie", "A Hundred Pipers"
- Engagements: War of 1812; First World War; Second World War; War in Afghanistan
- Battle honours: See #Battle honours

Commanders
- Current commander: LCol Christopher van den Berg
- Colonel-in-Chief: Prince Michael of Kent

Insignia
- Tartan: Based upon the MacGregor

The Essex and Kent Scottish is a Primary Reserve infantry regiment of the Canadian Army.

The regiment was formed in 1954 by the amalgamation of the Essex Scottish Regiment and the Kent Regiment.

Its colonel-in-chief is Prince Michael of Kent. The current commanding officer is Lieutenant-Colonel Christopher van den Berg (from 27 Sep 2025). The regimental sergeant major is CWO Jeremy Barnwell.

There are two standing platoons within the regiment, both in southwestern Ontario: 1 Platoon based in Windsor; and 2 Platoon, based in Chatham-Kent.

== Lineage ==
The pre-2023 regimental colour

The camp flag

=== The Essex Scottish Regiment ===
On June 12, 1885, The Essex Scottish Regiment was created as a part of the Canadian militia, then named the 21st Essex Battalion of Infantry. It would be composed of five infantry companies, which were formed between the years 1860 and 1885 in Essex County. Major John Richardson of Leamington Ontario was the first commanding officer of this regiment. It is from this date that the unbroken lineage of the Essex and Kent Scottish Regiment begins.

Over the following decades, the name of this regiment changed several times. On 4 February 1887 it was renamed the 21st battalion Essex Fusiliers. On 8 May 1900, the name was changed again to the 21st Regiment Essex Fusiliers. The final name for this regiment was the Essex Scottish Regiment, which took effect on 15 July 1927.

Before the First World War, the regiment did not see combat as a whole. Although it did not see any real action, it trained hard to go to war during the North-West Rebellion led by Louis Riel in 1885, and in 1900 during the Second Boer War it also sent men to South Africa. Over 100 men of the 21st Battalion Essex Fusiliers volunteered to serve there, but only 16 positions were given to the regiment. This small group of men was to serve with the 2nd Special Service Battalion of the Royal Canadian Regiment of Infantry. Of the sixteen men sent to Africa, two did not return.

=== The Kent Regiment ===
The regiment in Kent County was known as the 24th Kent Regiment. Prior to 1901, this regiment had been created and disbanded several times. It was not until 1 January 1901, with the increasing number of troops being sent to South Africa to fight in the Second Boer War, that the regiment was created permanently, with its headquarters in Chatham, Ontario. Seven of its men went to fight in the Boer War, of whom one did not return. Like the Essex Fusiliers, the Kent Regiment was also renamed several times. In December 1936, it was re-designated as the Kent Regiment (MG), which meant it was now a machine gun regiment, and not a light infantry regiment. Eventually, it was renamed as the Kent Regiment on 1 April 1941.

=== Chart ===
Lineage chart

1812
1815
1862
1863
1866
1885
1887
1900
1901
1914
1915
1916
1917
1920
1920
1927
1936
1939
1940
1940
1941
1941
1945
1946
1954
1962
1965
2012

The Loyal Essex Volunteers (Essex Rangers)
Disbanded
Volunteer Militia Coy of Infy at Windsor
No. 7 Coy, 24th "Kent Bn of Infy"
18th Bn, CEF
Disbanded
1st Bn (18th Bn, CEF), The Essex Fusiliers
1st Bn (18th Bn, CEF), The Essex Scottish
The Essex Scottish
The Essex Scottish Regt, CASF
1st Bn, The Essex Scottish Regt, CASF
Disbanded

The Loyal Kent Volunteers (Kent Rangers)
Disbanded
21st "Essex" Bn of Infy
21st Bn "Essex Fusiliers"
21st Regt "Essex Fusiliers"
99th "Overseas" Bn, CEF
Absorbed by 35th Reserve Bn
2nd Bn (99th Bn, CEF), (Note: Reserve) The Essex Fusiliers
2nd Bn (99th Bn, CEF), The Essex Scottish
Disbanded
2nd Bn, The Essex Scottish
The Essex Scottish
1st Bn, The Essex and Kent Scottish

The Western Rangers (Caldwell’s Rangers)
Disbanded
Volunteer Militia Coy of Infy at Leamington
No. 7 Coy, 25th "Elgin Bn of Infy"
241st "Overseas" Bn, CEF
Absorbed by 5th Reserve Bn
3rd Bn (241st Bn, CEF), The Essex Fusiliers
3rd Bn (241st Bn, CEF), The Essex Scottish
Disbanded
The Kent Regt, CASF
1st Bn, The Kent Regt, CASF
Disbanded
The Essex and Kent Scottish
The Essex and Kent Scottish
Perpetuates War of 1812 units

1st and 2nd Regts of Essex Militia	1st Regt of Kent Militia
Disbanded	Disbanded
24th "Kent" Regt
186th "Overseas" Bn, CEF
Absorbed by 4th Reserve Bn
1st Bn (186th Bn, CEF), The Kent Regt
B Coy, 2nd MG Bn, CMGC
The Kent Regt (MG)
2nd (Reserve) Bn, The Kent Regt (MG)
2nd (Reserve) Bn, The Kent Regt
The Kent Regt
2nd Bn, The Essex and Kent Scottish

== Perpetuations ==
=== War of 1812 ===
The Essex and Kent Scottish perpetuate the following units:

- 1st and 2nd Regiments of the Essex Militia
- the 1st Regiment of the Kent Militia
- the Loyal Kent Volunteers
- the Loyal Essex Volunteers (Essex Rangers)
- the Western Rangers (Caldwell's Rangers).

Further discussion of perpetuated units see: Canadian Units of the War of 1812

=== World War I ===
The Essex and Kent Scottish perpetuate the following units:

- 18th Battalion (Western Ontario), CEF
- 99th (Essex) Battalion, CEF
- 186th (Kent) Battalion, CEF
- 241st Battalion (Canadian Scottish Borderers), CEF.

== History ==
=== First World War ===
During the Great War details of the 21st Regiment Essex Fusiliers and 24th Kent Regiment, which included hundreds of men, were placed on active service on 6 August 1914 for local protection duties.

The 18th Battalion (Western Ontario), CEF was authorized on 7 November 1914 and embarked for Great Britain on 18 April 1915 and arrived in France on 15 September 1915. The battalion fought as part of the 4th Infantry Brigade, 2nd Canadian Division in France and Flanders until the end of the war and was disbanded on 15 September 1920.

The 99th Battalion was authorized on 22 December 1915 and embarked for Great Britain on 31 May 1916 where its personnel were absorbed by the '35th Reserve Battalion, CEF' to provide reinforcements to the Canadian Corps in the field on 6 July 1916. The battalion was disbanded on 1 September 1917.

The 186th Battalion was authorized on 15 July 1916 and embarked for Great Britain on 28 March 1917 where on 7 April 1917, its personnel were absorbed by the 4th Reserve Battalion, CEF, to provide reinforcements to the Canadian Corps in the field, with the battalion sisbanding on 15 September 1917.

The 241st Battalion was authorized on 15 July 1916 and embarked for Great Britain on 29 April 1917 where on 7 May 1917 its personnel were absorbed by the 5th Reserve Battalion, CEF, to provide reinforcements to the Canadian Corps in the field. The battalion disbanded on 1 September 1917.

The timeline for these battalions are as follows; Canada: October 1, 1914 – April 18, 1915, England: April 29, 1915 – September 14, 1915, France: September 15, 1915 – April 3, 1919, Canada: returned May 14, 1919. Some of the major battles these battalions took part in were; Ypres 1915, 1917; Festubert 1915; Mount Sorrel; Somme 1916; Flers Courcelette; Thiepval; Ancre Heights; Arras 1917; Vimy 1917; Hill 70: Passchendaele; Amiens; Scarpe 1918; Hindenburg Line; Canal du Nord; Cambrai 1918; Pursuit to Mons; France and Flanders 1915–1918

=== Second World War ===
During the Second World War, the Essex Scottish mobilized the Essex Scottish Regiment, CASF, for active service on 1 September 1939. It embarked for Great Britain on 16 July 1940 and was re-designated the 1st Battalion, the Essex Scottish Regiment, CASF, on 7 November 1940.

The battalion took part in the raid on Dieppe on 19 August 1942. The Essex Scottish Regiment left France for the attack with 553 men all ranks. At the end of the battle the Essex Scottish had suffered 530 casualties including 6 officers and 108 other ranks killed, the rest being taken prisoner. After the battle the Essex Scottish spent a lot of time rebuilding the regiment so they could continue fighting throughout the war.

The unit returned to France on 5 July 1944, as part of the 4th Infantry Brigade, 2nd Canadian Infantry Division. They moved to Normandy in time to serve with the British 2nd Army. It then participated in the advance along the Channel coast with the Canadian 1st Army including the liberation of Dieppe. The division saw heavy action in the Netherlands in late 1944 and took part in the final offensives in 1945. Some of the engagements the Essex Scottish were a part of were; Bourguebus Ridge; St. André-sur-Orne; Falaise; Falaise Roa; Clair Tizon; Forêt de la Londe; The Scheldt; Woensdrecht; South Beveland; The Rhineland; Goch-Calcar Road; The Hochwald; Xanten; Twente Canal; Groningen; Oldenburg; North-West Europe 1942, 1944-1945.

The Kent Regiment (Machine Gun) mobilized the Kent Regiment, CASF, for active service on 24 May 1940 and was re-designated the 1st Battalion, the Kent Regiment, CASF, on 7 November 1940. It served in Canada as part of the 14th Infantry Brigade, 8th Canadian Infantry Division, which was part of Pacific Command. The battalion was disbanded on 30 March 1946.

=== 1954 amalgamation ===
On 8 July 1954 while the Essex Scottish Regiment and the Kent Regiment were on a training exercise in Niagara-on-the-Lake the two units found out that they were going to be joined as one unit. However, it did not become official until 1 October, and the Essex and Kent Scottish Regiment was formed. The Essex and Kent Scottish Regiment was to have two battalions. The 1st Battalion's headquarters was in Windsor, while 2nd Battalion was stationed in Chatham. In 1964, the Canadian Forces Headquarters decided to make certain reductions and amalgamations. Many units in Ontario were affected by this decision, including the Essex and Kent Scottish Regiment. So, following new orders and protocol, the two battalions of the regiment amalgamated on March 31, 1965. This is the current structure of the regiment. When the two units first amalgamated there were several small issues which had to be resolved. First of all there were too many members in the unit by one full company. This meant that several of the officers and senior NCOs had to transfer to different units. One of the other problems was who would the commanding officer be for this new unit; however, it was soon made clear that even though the Kent Regiment had several qualified officers all of the future commanding officers would be from Windsor because that is where the regimental HQ would be located. One major event that happened in the first few years form the newly formed Essex and Kent Scottish Regiment which helped bring the two units together was the trooping of their first colours. This happened in Jackson Park in Windsor on 5 June 1955.

=== Modern conflicts ===
Today the Essex and Kent Scottish Regiment remains an active service unit in the Canadian army. It has sent many of its troops on United Nations peacekeeping missions, as well as over forty members to the recent conflict in Afghanistan. Members have also seen deployments to Lebanon (Operation Jade), Ukraine (Operation Unifier), Poland and Latvia (Operation Reassurance).

On 13 May 2023 in Windsor, Prince Michael of Kent, Colonel-in-Chief, presented new colours to the regiment, which were the first to include battle honours for the War of 1812 and Afghanistan. On 14 May, Prince Michael was in attendance as the old colours were laid up in Christ Church in Chatham.

=== Colonels-in-chief ===
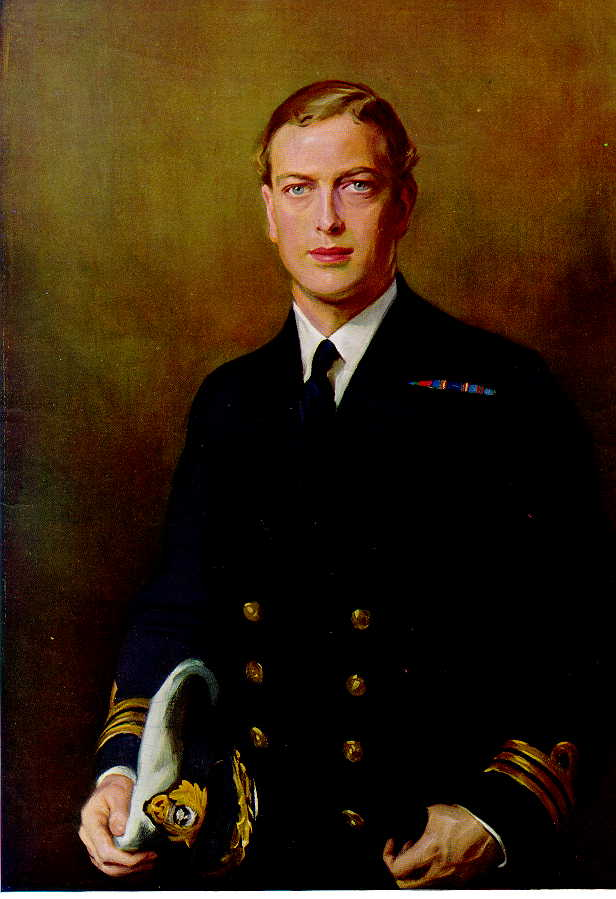
Prince George, Duke of Kent

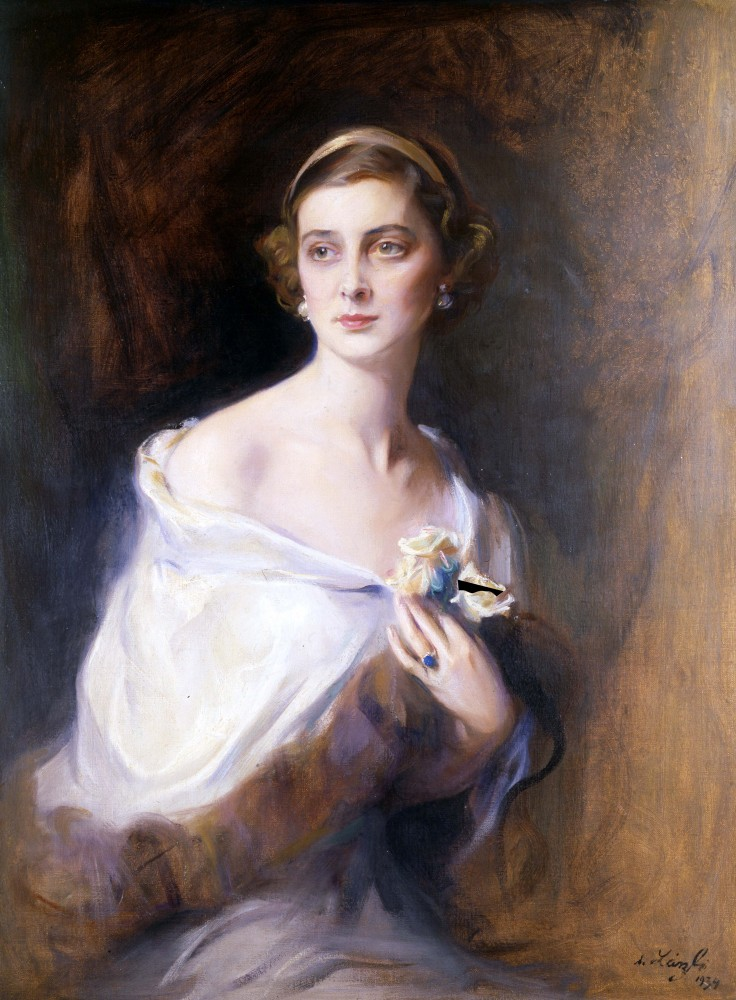
Princess Marina, Duchess of Kent

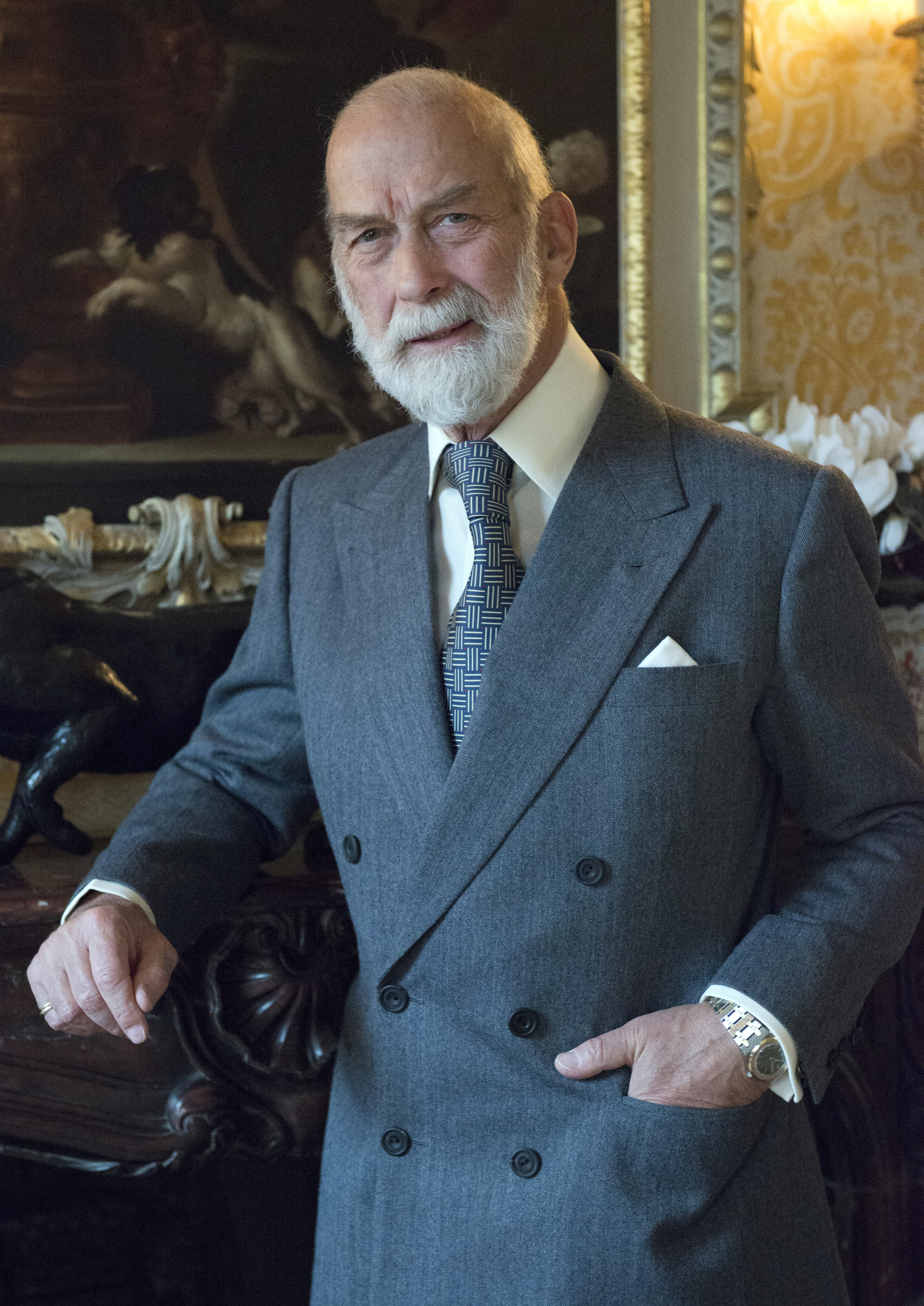
Prince Michael of Kent

Prince Michael of Kent is the present colonel-in-chief of the Essex and Kent Scottish, beginning on 14 November 2001. His first visit to his regiment was in March 2002, with subsequent visits in October 2007, June 2009, and May 2023. He also marked the 70th anniversary of the Dieppe Raid with the regiment in Dieppe, France, in August 2012.

Michael's father, Prince George, Duke of Kent, served as colonel-in-chief from 1937 to his death in 1942, after which Michael's mother, Princess Marina, Duchess of Kent, took on the role, from 1942 to 1968.

== Alliances ==
- United Kingdom – The Princess of Wales's Royal Regiment (Queen's and Royal Hampshires)
- United Kingdom – The Royal Anglian Regiment

== Battle honours ==
The pre-2023 regimental colour

In the list below, battle honours in small capitals were awarded for participation in large operations and campaigns, while those in lowercase indicate honours granted for more specific battles. Battle honours in bold type are emblazoned on the regimental colour.

=== War of 1812 ===
- Defence of Canada – 1812–1815 – Défense du Canada
- **Detroit**
- **Maumee**
- **Niagara**

The non-emblazonable honorary distinction Defence of Canada – 1812–1815 – Défense du Canada

=== Great War ===
- **Ypres, 1915, '17**
- Festubert, 1915
- Mount Sorrel
- **Somme, 1916, '18**
- **Flers–Courcelette**
- Thiepval
- Ancre Heights
- Arras, 1917, '18
- **Vimy, 1917**
- **Hill 70**
- **Passchendaele**
- **Amiens**
- Scarpe, 1918
- **Hindenburg Line**
- Canal du Nord
- **Cambrai, 1918**
- **Pursuit to Mons**
- France and Flanders, 1915–18

=== Second World War ===
- **Dieppe**
- **Bourguébus Ridge**
- St. André-sur-Orne
- **Falaise**
- Falaise Road
- Clair Tizon
- Forêt de la Londe
- **The Scheldt**
- Woensdrecht
- **South Beveland**
- The Rhineland
- **Goch–Calcar Road**
- **The Hochwald**
- **Xanten**
- Twente Canal
- **Groningen**
- **Oldenburg**
- North-West Europe, 1942, 1944–1945

=== War in Afghanistan ===
- **Afghanistan**

== Victoria Cross recipients ==
- L/Sgt Ellis Wellwood Sifton
- Major Frederick Albert Tilston

== Cadets ==
There are four cadet corps affiliated to the regiment

- 59 Legion Highlander Royal Canadian Army Cadet Corps (Chatham-Kent, Ontario)
- 1086 Walkerville Army Cadet Corps (Windsor, Ontario)
- 2715 Metropolitan Legion Royal Canadian Army Cadet Corps (Windsor, Ontario)
- 2918 South Essex Scottish Royal Canadian Army Cadet Corps (Kingsville, Ontario)

== Armouries ==
Site	Date(s) & Architect	Designated	Location	Description	Image
Maj FA Tilston VC Armoury, 4007 Sandwich Street, Windsor Ontario, N9C 1C3	2004	Windsor Military and Police Training Branch, Professional Advancement Facility	Windsor, Ontario	Housing the Essex and Kent Scottish (A COY, 1 PL), 31 Service Battalion, the Windsor Regiment and the Windsor Police Training Det. The building is complemented with a live fire shoot house, outdoor firing range, rappel tower, K-9 training site and indoor small arms trainer (S.A.T) range.	
Col. E.M. Ansell, OBE, MC, VD Armoury, 280 Bloomfield Road, Chatham, Ontario, N7M 2P0		Armoury	Chatham, Ontario	Housing the Essex and Kent Scottish (A COY, 2 PL).	
Former Home: Maj FA Tilston VC Armoury; 353 Freedom Way, Windsor	1899-02 / David Ewart	Canada's Register of Historic Places	Windsor, Ontario	A two-storey, red brick Baronial style structure with a three-storey tower, centrally located in the city. It housed the Essex and Kent Scottish until 2004, when the new location was opened on Sandwich St. The building is now owned by the University of Windsor.	

== See also ==
- Canadian-Scottish regiment
