= Clearing the Channel Coast =

World War II campaign to liberate northern France

- Part of Siegfried Line campaign
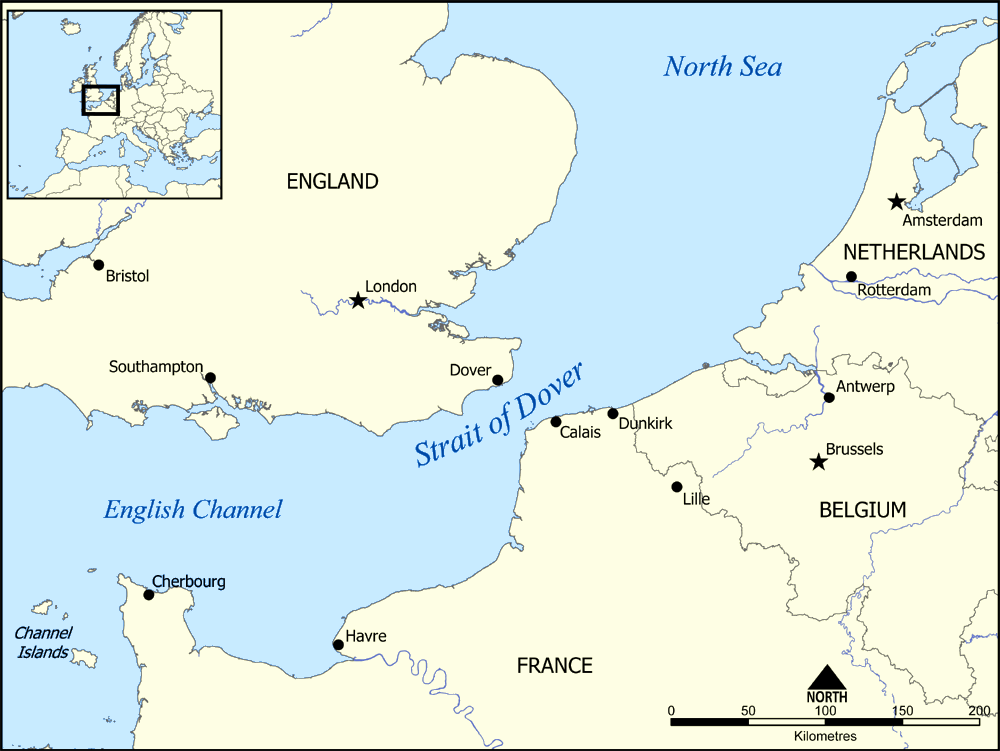
- The Channel coast
Date	September–November 1944
Location	France and Belgium
Result	Allied victory

Belligerents
Canada; United Kingdom; Poland; Czechoslovakia; Belgium; Netherlands; France	Germany

Commanders and leaders
(Canada) Harry Crerar	(Nazi Germany) Gustav-Adolf von Zangen

Units involved
(Canada) First Canadian Army	(Nazi Germany) 15th Army

Strength
2 armoured divisions 4 infantry divisions	3 divisions (in France); 2 divisions (in Holland)

Casualties and losses
14,300 casualties	13,100 killed, wounded, missing 70,971 captured Total: 84,071 casualties

Clearing the Channel Coast was a World War II task undertaken by the First Canadian Army in August 1944, following the Allied Operation Overlord and the victory, break-out and pursuit from Normandy.

The Canadian army advanced from Normandy to the Scheldt river in Belgium. En route, they were to capture the Channel ports needed to supply the Allied armies, clear the Germans from the Channel littoral and launch sites for the V-1 flying bombs. The German 15th Army was able only to oppose the advance with sporadic resistance, wary of being outflanked and isolated by the rapidly advancing British Second Army on the right of the Canadians and executed an orderly retreat north-eastwards towards the Scheldt.

On 4 September Adolf Hitler declared the Channel ports to be fortresses but Dieppe and Ostend were taken without opposition. Le Havre, Boulogne and Calais were subjected to set-piece assaults, after massed bombing and an attack on Dunkirk was cancelled and the garrison contained. Troops investing Dunkirk were freed for the Battle of the Scheldt, where the First Canadian Army reduced the Breskens Pocket, cleared the mouth of the Scheldt and opened Antwerp to Allied shipping.

== Background ==
=== Normandy to the Seine ===
The German armies had strongly resisted the Allied break-out from Normandy and when the German front collapsed in August they had insufficient reserves of manpower and equipment to resist and no defence lines between Normandy and the Siegfried Line. The British I Corps, with four divisions, attached to the Canadian army, had been advancing eastwards from the River Dives along the coast. The 6th Airborne Division and attached units captured Troarn and overran the German coastal artillery at Houlgate but deliberate flooding by the Germans, the defences of Cabourg and positions nearby at Dozulé, slowed the advance across the Dives delta. On 16 August, German resistance faltered; Canadian reconnaissance had been ordered on 19 August and the authorization for a full advance and pursuit by the Canadians was issued on 23 August.

General Bernard Montgomery, the 21st Army Group commander, issued a directive on 26 August, that all German forces in the Pas de Calais and Flanders were to be destroyed and Antwerp was to be captured. The First Canadian Army was required to cross the Seine and capture Dieppe and Le Havre with the minimum of forces and delay, while occupying the coast as far as Bruges. The Canadian army was to advance with a strong right wing and envelop resistance by swinging towards the coast; support could be expected from the First Allied Airborne Army. The Second Army was to operate on the inland flank of the Canadians and dash for Amiens, cutting the communications of the German forces facing the Canadian Army.

It is a measure of the German disintegration that the 1st Polish Armoured Division was in Ypres on 6 September and Canadian units were at Dunkirk on 7 September, just fifteen days after Falaise, despite their losses in the Normandy battles. There was significant resistance in the Canadian sector. Adolf Hitler had ordered that most of the Channel ports be established as fortresses and prepared to withstand a siege. Since the Allies needed the port facilities to supply their advance, they could not be sealed off and left to wither on the vine. The Germans had established artillery positions capable of shelling Dover, threatening allied shipping and there were launch sites for the V-1 flying bombs bombarding London.

== Prelude ==
=== Allied armies ===
The composition of the First Canadian Army varied to meet changing demands but in general terms it was composed of the II Canadian Corps and the I British Corps. Within these formations, at various times, were Czech, Polish, French, Dutch and Belgian units. After Normandy, the Polish and Czech formations were augmented by countrymen who had been conscripted into the German Army and captured by the Allied armies. The First Canadian Army had fought several battles in Normandy and suffered many casualties. This was particularly serious in the infantry rifle companies. I Corps (Lieutenant-General John Crocker), attached to the First Canadian Army, had the 7th Armoured Division and the 49th (West Riding) Infantry Division, 51st (Highland) Division and the British 6th Airborne Division. The performance of some of these divisions had been criticised during the Battle of Normandy and had been relegated to defensive positions on the eastern flank of the bridgehead. The 6th Airborne Division had landed in Operation Tonga on D-Day and despite its lack of heavy weapons, remained defending the area. It had suffered many casualties and Major-General Richard Gale, had been ordered to harry the German retreat yet conserve its manpower for the rebuilding that was due. The 6th Airborne Division was reinforced by the 1st Belgian Infantry Brigade and the Royal Netherlands Brigade (Prinses Irene), which were to gain "operational experience in quieter sections of the line in the hope that ultimately they would return to their own countries and form nuclei around which larger national forces might be organized". I Corps advanced along the Channel coast, with the II Canadian Corps on the right.

=== German ===
Much of Army Group B (Heeresgruppe B) had been destroyed in Normandy and the Falaise Pocket but divisions deployed east of the Allied bridgehead were largely intact. German troops within the "fortress cities" were generally second-rate and included some Austrian and other nationalities, that were not trusted enough to carry arms.

=== Advance to the Seine ===
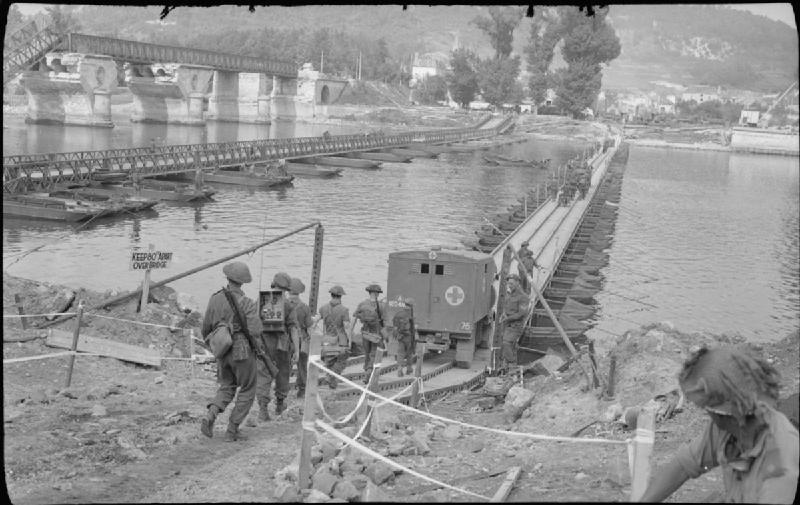
British troops cross the River Seine over a Bailey bridge at Vernon, 27 August 1944.

The First Canadian Army advance to the Seine was called Operation Paddle. It had been hoped by the Allied commanders that a defeat comparable with the Falaise Pocket could be inflicted on the Germans by trapping them against the Seine and the sea. The American Third Army advanced northwards to Elbeuf, across the Second Army line of advance, to cut off the route towards Paris and was a partial success. Although much of its remaining transport and the bulk of its armour was lost west of the Seine, Army Group B held up the Canadians, protecting improvised river crossings and significant quantities of men and materiel were saved.

The towns along the River Touques were evacuated by the Germans around 24 August and the capture of Lisieux, about 45 km (28 mi) east of Caen, opened an important route eastwards. Next day, the next natural barrier, the River Risle was crossed just north of Brionne by the 11th Hussars, with other units close behind. The 6th Airlanding Brigade of the 6th Airborne Division took Honfleur on the Seine estuary but progress along the coast was slower than inland, rivers being wider and more difficult to cross. The 6th Airborne Division occupied the west bank of the Risle from Pont Audemer downstream to the Seine on 26 August, completing its tasks in France and the division returned to Britain on 3 September. Clearance of the last German units west of the Seine was completed on 30 August.

=== Crossing the Seine ===
I British Corps put patrols across the Seine on 31 August. The advance to the Seine had outstripped the preparations of the Royal Canadian Engineers for bridging equipment and assault boats but newly assembled assault boats carried the 3rd Canadian Infantry Division across the Seine at Elbeuf on 27 August. Ferries for wheeled and armoured vehicles were in operation in the afternoon.

== Liberations ==
=== Dieppe ===
Dieppe had been abandoned by the Germans before the order Hitler sent for it to be defended as a "fortress" had been received and it was captured by the 2nd Canadian Infantry Division on 1 September, which had last been in the port during the Dieppe Raid in 1942. A ceremonial parade was held on 5 September and despite demolitions, the port was cleared and in use on 7 September, a delivery of oil and petrol being shipped to Brussels on 9 September.

=== Le Havre ===
Le Havre was attacked by the I British Corps, supported by Hobart's Funnies, specialized armoured vehicles of the 79th Armoured Division and bombardment from land, sea and air. It was taken on 12 September after 48 hours but the port needed lengthy clearance and repair.

=== Boulogne ===
Boulogne was reached on 5 September but the garrison had received the Hitler "fortress" order. The city was protected by high ground and was attacked by the 3rd Canadian Division with extensive air and artillery support from 17 to 22 September.

=== Rocket sites ===
On 1 September, the last V-1 was launched against London as the Canadians were moving through the launch areas.

=== Calais and Cap Gris Nez ===
Calais was sealed off in early September and Wissant was quickly captured, though an early attack on Cap Gris Nez failed. The assault on Calais itself opened on 25 September and the town fell on 30 September. A second attack on the Cap Gris Nez batteries opened on 29 September and the positions secured by the afternoon of the same day. Despite the strong defences and although the city had been declared a Fortress, the garrison needed little persuasion to surrender and their reluctance to fight to the end was repeated at Cap Gris Nez.

=== Dunkirk ===
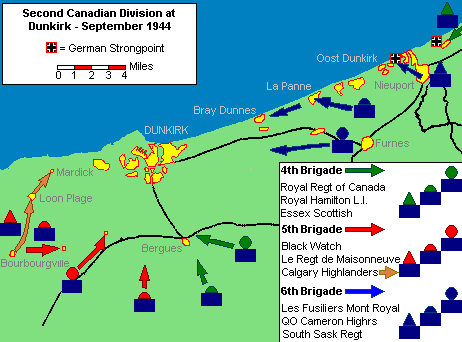
Diagram showing the investment of Dunkirk

Although Dunkirk had been reached by 7 September, it soon became clear that the garrison would fight to hold a port that was largely destroyed. It was then judged to be a better use of men and materiel to clear the Germans from the Scheldt estuary and open the port of Antwerp, which had been captured intact. A brigade sized force was left to isolate Dunkirk, which eventually surrendered on 9 May 1945, after the general German surrender. The investment was conducted by the 1st Czechoslovak Armoured Brigade, in which Belgian Resistance members assisted with information and French Resistance members were converted to regular units.

=== Belgium ===
Ostend had been omitted from Hitler's list of "fortresses" and so was evacuated, despite its strong defences. The port had been demolished. The 1st Polish Armoured Division crossed the Belgian border and captured Ypres on 6 September, reaching the Ghent–Bruges Canal on 9 September.

=== Scheldt ===
A long and costly operation was required to clear the Germans from both banks of the Scheldt, so that the Port of Antwerp could be opened.

== Aftermath ==
Although Dieppe came rapidly into use, it could supply only a quarter of the needs of the 21st Army Group. The capture of Le Havre, Boulogne, Calais and Ostend only eased Allied supply problems after extensive clearance of debris and mines. Ostend was restricted to personnel only but the Boulogne terminal for a Pluto oil pipeline (Dumbo) was of great benefit, becoming the "... main supplies of fuel during the winter and spring campaigns" of the Allies. It has been questioned whether the capture of the defended ports was worthwhile, given the need for much effort to bring them into use and the greater potential benefit of Antwerp.

After the failure of Operation Market Garden, Eisenhower "turned to Antwerp, which despite the long-delayed capture of Le Havre on 12 September, of Brest on the 18th and of Calais on the 30th, remained, as the closest, largest and best-preserved of the ports, the necessary solution to the difficulties of supply." Antwerp was not opened until 29 November 1944 after the Battle of the Scheldt to clear the approaches to the Port Of Antwerp, which had been delayed by Montgomery. This largely solved Allied supply problems.

== See also ==
- Operation Undergo
- Channel ports
