= Operation Fusilade =

Cancelled 1944 attack on Dieppe by Canadian Army

- Part of Allied pursuit in North-West Europe, World War II
Date	1 September 1944
Location	Dieppe, Normandy, France
Result	Canadian victory: Dieppe liberated by Canadians.

Belligerents
Canada; United Kingdom	Germany

Commanders and leaders
(United Kingdom) Field Marshal Bernard Montgomery (Canada) Lt. Gen. Guy Simonds (Canada) Maj. Gen. Bruce Matthews	Local command

Strength
2nd Canadian Infantry Division; 8th Reconnaissance Regiment; RAF Bomber Command (cancelled)	Evacuated prior to Allied arrival

Casualties and losses
None	None

Operation Fusilade was the plan for a set-piece assault on the French port of Dieppe during the Second World War. In the event, the German occupiers, not having received orders to hold the town, evacuated shortly before Fusilade, which was cancelled. The 8th Reconnaissance Regiment (14th Canadian Hussars) of the 2nd Canadian Division entered the town unopposed on September 1, 1944, to a warm welcome from the French inhabitants. The planned bombing of the town was hastily cancelled. The nearby small fishing port of Le Tréport was taken on the same day by the 3rd Canadian Division. Some days later, there was a memorial ceremony at the nearby Canadian military cemetery to honour the interred men killed in the 1942 Dieppe Raid.

== Aftermath ==
The Germans had only partly demolished the port facilities, and bridges and the first ships unloaded on 6 September. A train left on 9 September with petrol and oil for Brussels. Dieppe was able to supply a quarter of the needs of the 21st Army Group.

== See also ==
- Clearing the Channel Coast
