= Kent Regiment =

The Kent Regiment
- Active: 1901–1954
- Country: Canada
- Branch: Canadian Militia (1901–1940); Canadian Army (1940–1954)
- Type: Line Infantry
- Role: Infantry
- Size: One Battalion
- Part of: Non-Permanent Active Militia (1901–1940); Royal Canadian Infantry Corps (1942–1954)
- Garrison/HQ: Chatham, ON
- Engagements: First World War
- Battle honours: Ypres, 1917

The Kent Regiment was an infantry regiment of the Canadian Army from 1901 to 1954. In 1954 it was amalgamated with The Essex Scottish Regiment to form The Essex and Kent Scottish Regiment.

The regiment was formed on January 1, 1901. It was given the title of the 24th Kent Regiment, with the headquarters stationed in Chatham, Ontario, Canada. As with many regiments in the Canadian Forces, the 24th Kent Regiment was renamed, and more than once. In December 1936, the regiment was redesignated as The Kent Regiment (MG) when it amalgamated with B Company, 2nd Machine Gun Battalion, CMGC.

Eventually, it was named The Kent Regiment on April 1, 1941.

The Kent Regiment did not go overseas as a unit during World War II, but was on active duty for coastal defense in NS and BC; and power station guard near Niagara Falls. They also provided reinforcements to many Ontario units serving overseas, most importantly The Essex Scottish, especially after Dieppe. Both The Kent Regiment and The Essex Scottish raised 2nd Battalions for reserve service in Canada as Non-Permanent Active Militia (NPAM).

== Lineage ==
- Originated on 1 January 1901, in Chatham, Ontario, as the 24th Kent Regiment.
- Redesignated on 29 March 1920, as The Kent Regiment.
- Amalgamated on 15 December 1936, with B Company, 2nd Machine Gun Battalion, CMGC (now The Royal Canadian Regiment), and Redesignated as The Kent Regiment (Machine Gun).
- Redesignated on 7 November 1941, as the 2nd (Reserve) Battalion, The Kent Regiment (Machine Gun).
- Redesignated on 1 April 1941, as the 2nd (Reserve) Battalion, The Kent Regiment.
- Redesignated on 30 March 1946, as The Kent Regiment.
- Amalgamated on 1 October 1954, with The Essex Scottish Regiment and Redesignated as The Essex and Kent Scottish.

== Perpetuations ==
- 186th (Kent) Battalion, CEF

== Alliances ==
United Kingdom - The Queen's Own Royal West Kent Regiment (1927–1954)

== Battle Honours ==
=== The Great War ===
- Ypres, 1917
