= Battle of Groningen =

1945 World War II battle

Coordinates: 53.2186°N 6.5672°E

- Part of the North-West Europe campaign in the Western Front of the European theatre of World War II
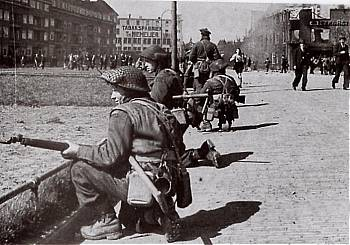
- Canadian troops in action at Groningen.
Date	13–16 April 1945
Location	Groningen, Netherlands
Result	Canadian-Dutch victory

Belligerents
Canada; Netherlands	(Nazi Germany) Germany

Commanders and leaders
(Canada) Bruce Matthews	(Nazi Germany) Karl Böttcher

Units involved
(Canada) 2nd Infantry Division (Netherlands) Dutch Resistance	Elements of: (Nazi Germany) 408th Infantry Division; 34th Panzergrenadier Division; Sicherheitsdienst, and scattered Luftwaffe, Kriegsmarine, Hitler Youth, Legione SS Italiana Along with a notably large force of local police and Dutch collaborators. upwards 400 of them contributed to the battle.

Strength
~14,000	~7,500

Casualties and losses
43 dead 166 wounded	130 dead 5,212 captured

The Battle of Groningen took place during the penultimate month of World War II in Europe, on 13 to 16 April 1945, in the city of Groningen. The 2nd Canadian Division attacked Groningen (though the whole division was never in combat at any given time), defended by 7,000 German soldiers and Dutch and Belgian SS troops. There were also many Luftwaffe troops manning flak guns in the area. Groningen also held the headquarters for the Sicherheitsdienst in the northern Netherlands. The German command structure was poor and the defenders had never exercised together.

2nd Canadian Division consisted of nine infantry battalions, a machine gun battalion, a reconnaissance battalion, and three combat engineer companies (Royal Canadian Engineers). It was battle experienced with a proportion of partially trained reinforcements. Armour from the 10th Armoured Regiment (Fort Garry Horse) and the 9th Armoured Regiment (British Columbia Dragoons) was used in support.

== German objectives ==
German soldiers fought to hold the city. Dutch SS troops fighting alongside the German defenders had reason to fear for their lives if they surrendered. The crimes of the SS were acutely known to the Canadians and Dutch, since the Malmedy massacre only four months prior. The Germans hoped to use the city in order to cover the withdrawal of forces from Friesland to Germany, in addition to defending the Ems entrance into Germany. Defending the Ems was especially important for the Germans because the Kriegsmarine still used Emden as a port for surface vessels and U-boats.

== Allied objectives ==
Wary of advancing into the western Netherlands and incurring heavy casualties (as well as losses to the densely packed civilian population) at a late stage of the war (fighting in Langstraat and Betuwe showed that conditions were very favourable to the defence), the First Canadian Army instead moved northeast, supporting the flank of the British Second Army as they entered Germany proper.

== Battle ==
German forces were mainly deployed in the ancient city centre, shielded in part by an ancient canal. Some troops were deployed in the southern suburbs. A German pocket in the power station surrendered after the fall of the inner city. The inner city was reached on 14 April.

Western approaches to the old town were blocked because the bridges over the canal were destroyed. The Herebrug bridge in the south of the old town was not destroyed, but it took a day before the Germans with machine guns were defeated in the buildings north of a circular 'circus' on the north side of the bridge. The Canadians managed to enter the north of the city centre, Nieuwe Stad, after two hours of fighting in the Noorderplantsoen park, on the site of the old city walls.

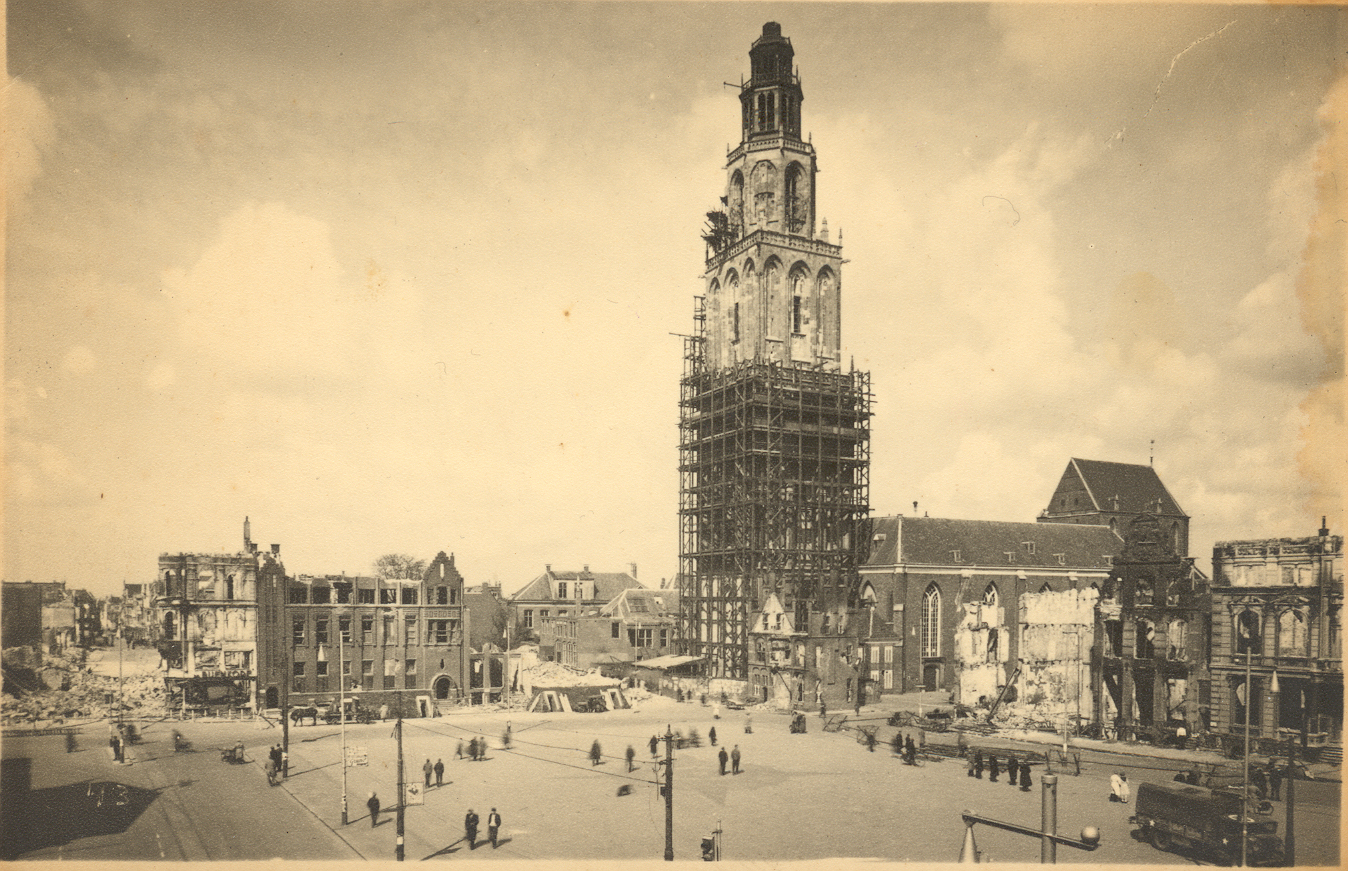
The Grote Markt after liberation

The fight in the Grote markt (central market square) was the fiercest part of the battle. Several German machine guns were emplaced in the buildings north of the square. The buildings had to be destroyed by tank cannon fire. The Nieuwe Stad was conquered, but the Canadians could not reach the Oude Stad from the north, due to fierce German resistance.

The German commander surrendered on 16 April once it was clear further resistance was useless.

The Canadians used armour effectively in co-operation with their infantry. Artillery support was forbidden out of fear of harming the civilian population.

== Result ==
The death toll included approximately 130 Germans, 43 Canadians, and 100 Dutch civilians. Some 270 buildings were damaged or destroyed in the fighting. Over 5,200 Germans surrendered (including 95 officers) and the remaining Germans (about 2,000) fled northeast, and the 2nd Division again met them in battles such as the Battle of Grüppenbühren near Delmenhorst.

== Significance ==
Groningen was one of the largest urban battles of the war for the Canadian Army. While Ortona was made famous by news reports referring to it as "Little Stalingrad", Groningen involved five times as many Canadian soldiers in direct combat.

== External sources ==
- "Groningen". Calgary Highlanders website
- "Groningen". Canadian Soldiers website
