= 2nd Canadian Division during World War II =

Infantry division of the Canadian Army (1939–45)

2nd Canadian Infantry Division
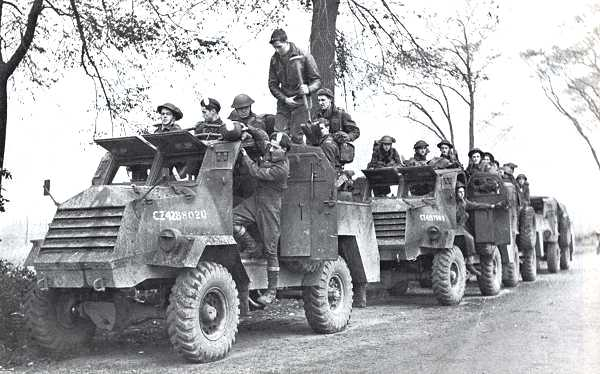
- Forces of the Royal Hamilton Light Infantry, part of the 2nd Canadian Infantry Division, move towards South Beveland during the Battle of the Scheldt, October 1944
- Active: 1939–1945
- Country: Canada
- Branch: Canadian Army
- Type: Infantry
- Size: Division
- Part of: I Canadian Corps (1942–1944); II Canadian Corps (1944–1945)
- Engagements: World War II: Dieppe Raid; Caen; Verrières Ridge; Cintheaux; Falaise; The Scheldt; The Rhineland; Battle of Groningen

Commanders
- Notable commanders: John Roberts; Guy Simonds; E. L. M. Burns; Charles Foulkes; Bruce Matthews

Insignia
- Formation patch

The 2nd Canadian Division, an infantry division of the Canadian Army, was mobilized for war service on 1 September 1939 at the outset of World War II. Adopting the designation of the 2nd Canadian Division, it was initially composed of volunteers within brigades established along regional lines. With questions concerning overseas deployment resolved, the division's respective commands were formed in May and June 1940, and at British Prime Minister Winston Churchill's request, the division was deployed to the United Kingdom between 1 August and 25 December 1940, forming part of the Canadian Corps.

Having performed well in training exercises during 1941 and early 1942, elements of the 2nd Division were selected as the main force for Operation Jubilee, a large-scale amphibious raid on the port of Dieppe in German-occupied France. On 19 August 1942, with air and naval gunfire support, the division's 4th and 6th Infantry Brigades assaulted Dieppe's beaches. The Germans were well prepared and, despite being reinforced, the Canadians sustained heavy losses, with fewer than half their number returning to the United Kingdom.

Following a period of reconstruction and retraining from 1942 to 1944, the division joined II Canadian Corps as part of the British Second Army for the Allied invasion of Normandy. The division was redesignated as 2nd Canadian Infantry Division in January 1943. The 2nd Division saw significant action from 20 July to 21 August in the battles for Caen and Falaise. Joining the newly activated headquarters of the First Canadian Army in the assault on northwestern Europe, the 2nd Canadian Infantry Division took part in the advance along the Channel coast, the Battle of the Scheldt, and the liberation of the Netherlands. The division was disbanded shortly after the end of the war.

== Formation, garrison duties and organization (1939–1940) ==
At the start of the Second World War, the Canadian Active Service Force (CASF) was initially composed of two divisions: the 1st and 2nd Canadian Divisions, both mobilized on 1 September 1939. The fighting power of this force lay in its constituent infantry brigades, of which each division had three. These were in turn composed of three rifle and one machine gun battalion, with additional divisional artillery and engineer units in support.

Command of the division was given to Major-General Victor Odlum, a distinguished veteran of the First World War. After recruiting resumed in spring 1940, its strength rose from 13,829 all ranks on 2 March to 17,635 on 22 June. Like its sister formation, the 2nd Canadian Division was originally organized along regional lines. Its 4th Brigade was composed of regiments from Ontario, the 5th Brigade of regiments from Quebec, and the 6th Brigade of regiments from Western Canada. These were the same infantry brigades—although their constituent battalions were different—that had formed part of the 2nd Canadian Division during its service on the Western Front as part of the Canadian Expeditionary Force during the First World War.

It was over a year before the 2nd Division came together as a cohesive unit and, during the interim period between formation and arrival in the United Kingdom, many changes to its organization were made. The first brigade concentrations took place in May and June 1940, until which time all units had trained in their own garrisons. The 4th Brigade assembled at Camp Borden in Ontario, the 5th at Valcartier Camp in Quebec, and the 6th at Camp Shilo in Manitoba. The divisional artillery was concentrated at artillery training centres at Camp Petawawa in Ontario, and at Shilo.

The 2nd Division's structure was altered in early 1940, reducing its number of machine-gun battalions from three to one. The Ottawa Camerons and the Chaudières (now a rifle battalion) were reassigned to the newly mobilized 3rd Canadian Infantry Division. The Winnipeg Grenadiers were sent to Jamaica for garrison duty, after which they returned to Canada, then redeployed to Hong Kong, where they were captured during the Battle of Hong Kong on 25 December 1941. In 1941, the Toronto Scottish Regiment was transferred from the 1st Division to become the machine-gun battalion of the 2nd Division.

In May 1940, The Black Watch were moved from Valcartier to Newfoundland, and in June, the 2nd Division was earmarked for garrison duty, with the Royal Regiment of Canada and Les Fusiliers Mont Royal arriving in Iceland later that month. However, at the request of Winston Churchill, the British prime minister, these deployments were cut short, as the division was badly needed in England to supplement the British Army—then facing the imminent possibility of German invasion.

As a result, most of the 2nd Division's units were sent to the United Kingdom in August 1940, although the Iceland garrison remained in place until 31 October. The absence of the Mont Royals allowed Odlum to reassign the Calgary Highlanders to the 5th Brigade in September, in an attempt to ethnically mix the brigades of the division. By late December 1940, the 2nd Canadian Division was joined with the 1st to form the Canadian Corps (later renamed I Canadian Corps).

== Training in the United Kingdom (1941) ==
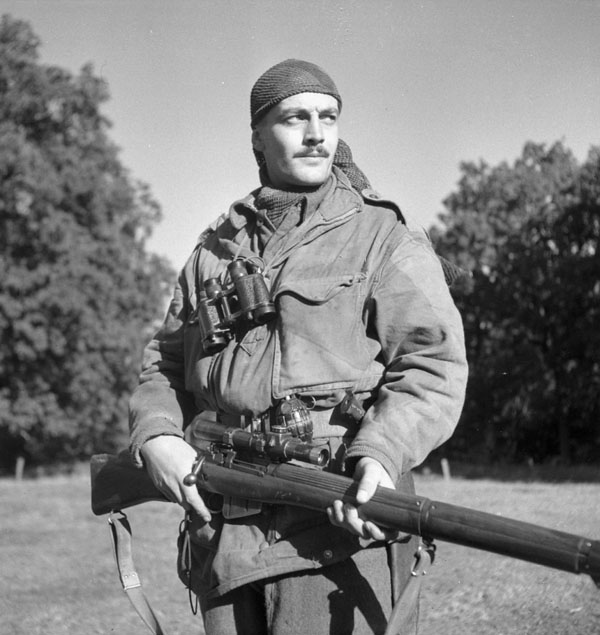
Sgt. Harold Marshall of the Calgary Highlanders' Sniper Platoon

In 1941, the 8th Reconnaissance Regiment (14th Canadian Hussars) was raised from 2nd Division personnel supplemented by reinforcements from Canada. Due to equipment shortages, it was often difficult to adequately supply newly arrived divisions in England. Artillery units had to make use of outmoded 75 mm guns with steel wheels, and a lack of anti-aircraft guns—diverted to civil defence during the height of the Battle of Britain—left Canadian units to fend for themselves with small arms. However, by February 1941, enough Bren guns had been issued to the infantry units and, by September, the artillery had been equipped with 25-pounder gun-howitzers, although signals equipment and transport were still lacking and anti-tank guns were dangerously scarce.

When the division was not engaged in coastal-defence duties or unit training, formation-level training took the form of increasingly larger exercises. Exercise Waterloo, conducted from 14 to 16 June 1941, was the largest in the United Kingdom to date, with I Canadian Corps counter-attacking an imagined German sea and air landing. Exercise Bumper, held from 29 September to 3 October, was larger still, involving about 250,000 men. These exercises tended to concentrate on traffic control, communications, and logistical concerns, and were of little practical value to the infantry.

On 23 December 1941, Major-General Harry Crerar was appointed as divisional commander, replacing Odlum, who had ceased command in November following his appointment as Canadian High Commissioner to Australia, temporarily handing command over to Major-General John Roberts. However, Crerar was appointed temporary corps commander the same day and, as a result, never actually fulfilled the role of divisional commander, with Roberts eventually being confirmed in the role in April 1942. Meanwhile, on 30 December 1941, the Calgary Highlanders introduced "battle drill" to the division. This new type of training emphasized small-unit tactics as well as "hardening" training through the use of live ammunition, slaughterhouse visits, and obstacle courses, and was adopted throughout Commonwealth forces stationed in Britain.

== Operation Jubilee (1942) ==
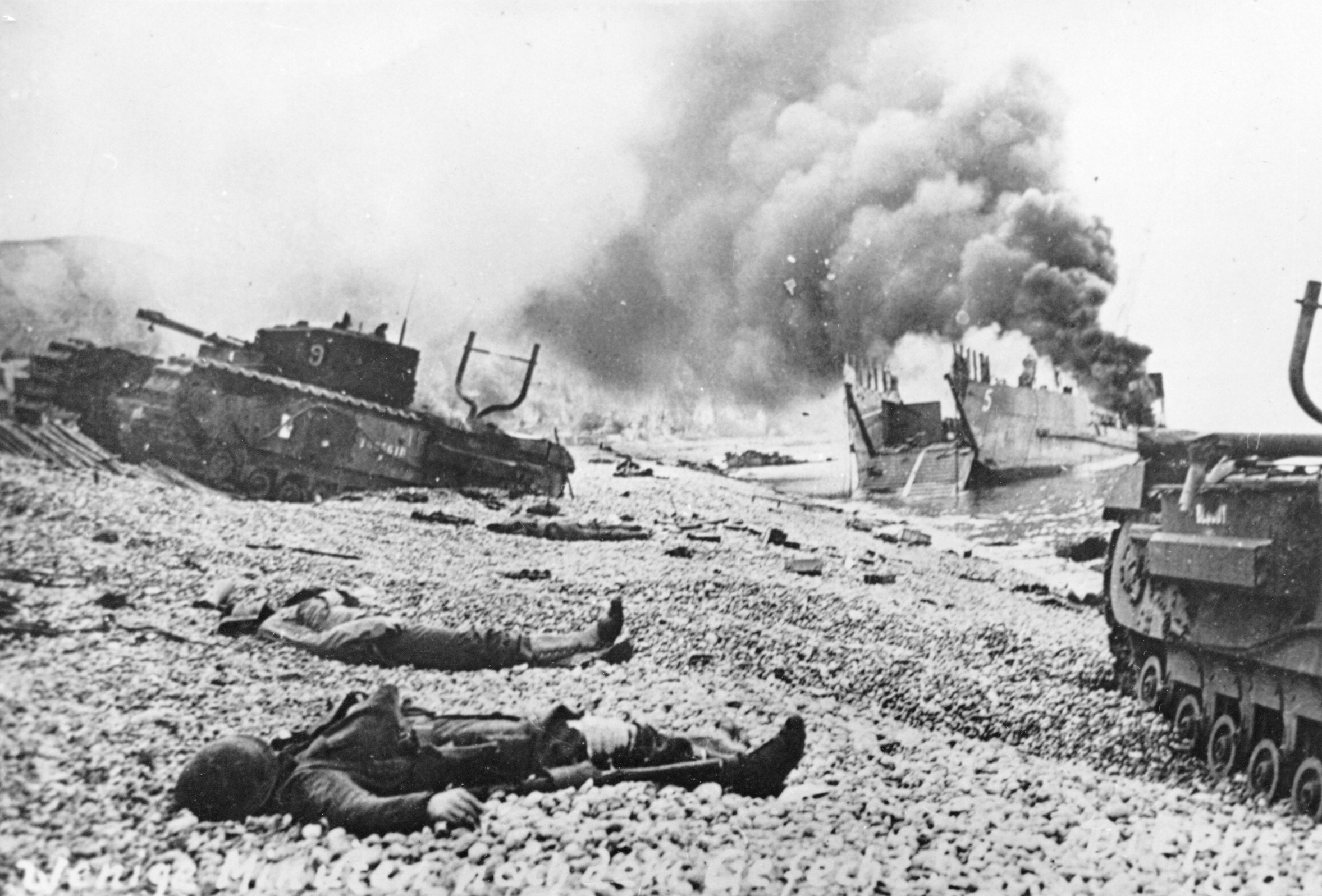
Soldiers' corpses from the 2nd Canadian Infantry Division following the Dieppe Raid

In early 1942, under Roberts, the 2nd Canadian Infantry Division participated in several additional full-scale combat exercises that again gauged the ability of Commonwealth divisions to repel a possible German invasion. As April and May progressed, the exercises intensified, becoming significantly more demanding on the participants. As a result, the 2nd Division was judged to be one of the four best divisions in the United Kingdom, and was selected as the primary force for the upcoming Allied attack on the German-occupied port of Dieppe—codenamed Operation Jubilee. Mounted as a test of whether such a landing was feasible, the Dieppe raid was to be undertaken by the 4th and 6th Brigades, with additional naval, air, and infantry support. Significant elements of the 5th Brigade were also involved.

On 19 August 1942, while British commando units attacked bunker positions on the outskirts of Dieppe, forces of the 2nd Division landed on four beaches. The easternmost, Blue Beach, which was at the foot of a sheer cliff, presented the most difficulties; the Royal Regiment of Canada, with a company of the Black Watch, was held at bay by two platoons of German defenders. Only six per cent of the men who landed on Blue Beach returned to Britain.

The main beaches, codenamed White and Red, lay in front of Dieppe itself. Making only minor gains, the majority of the 4th and 6th Brigades became pinned down on the beach and, despite the arrival of an armoured squadron from the Calgary Tank Regiment, casualties were heavy. Reinforcements from the Mont Royals had little effect, and surviving forces were withdrawn by 11:00. Of the nearly 5,000 Canadian troops who participated, more than half were killed, wounded or captured.

At Green Beach to the west, part of the South Saskatchewan Regiment was landed on the wrong side of the Scie River, necessitating an assault over the machine-gun-swept bridge there so that it could assault the cliffs to the west. The village of Pourville was captured, but the eastern cliffs proved impossible to capture, thereby blocking the regiment's assault on an artillery battery and a radar station. The Queen's Own Cameron Highlanders landed with the objective of moving south to attack an airfield and a divisional headquarters. Neither battalion achieved its objectives. As with the other three beaches, Canadian casualties were high, with 160 fatalities. Two Victoria Crosses were awarded for actions at Dieppe: to Lieutenant-Colonel Cecil Merritt of the South Saskatchewan Regiment and to Honorary Captain John Foote, chaplain of the Royal Hamilton Light Infantry.

== Rebuilding (1942–1944) ==
The formation was redesignated as the 2nd Canadian Infantry Division in January 1943. Throughout that year, the division rebuilt after Dieppe, where 3,367 of the 4,963 Canadians embarked became casualties. In April, Major-General Guy Simonds—the first officer to command the division who had not served in the Great War—assumed command from Roberts, before handing over the following month to Major-General E. L. M. Burns. In January 1944, Major-General Charles Foulkes—another officer who, like Simonds, had been too young to serve in the Great War—replaced Burns, who went to Italy to command I Canadian Corps, where it had been deployed towards the end of 1943. The following month, all three brigade commanders were replaced as part of a general move to modernize the Canadian forces' higher echelons; further sweeping changes throughout all levels of command, coupled with the lingering effects of the large influx of new personnel during 1943, lowered morale in the division.

However, in March 1944, training again intensified, heralding the coming invasion of Europe. On 9 March, the 2nd Division was inspected by King George VI, and by May the division numbered close to 18,000 fully equipped and trained soldiers. When D-Day arrived on 6 June 1944, the main Canadian assault was led by the 3rd Canadian Infantry Division, while the 2nd Division was held in reserve. At this time, the division consisted of three brigades—4th, 5th and 6th—each of three infantry battalions, and each brigade had a ground defence platoon provided by the Lorne Scots. At divisional level, the Toronto Scottish Regiment provided a machine-gun battalion and the 8th Reconnaissance Regiment (14th Canadian Hussars) provided reconnaissance. Other combat-support and service-support units included field, anti-tank and anti-aircraft artillery; field engineers; electrical and mechanical engineers; and signals, medical, ordnance, service corps and provost units.

== Battle of Normandy ==
The 3rd Canadian Infantry Division assaulted Juno Beach on D-Day, 6 June 1944. Having successfully landed in Normandy, Allied forces soon became embroiled in battles against German armour and were unable to significantly expand their beachhead; by the time the 2nd Division came ashore at the end of the first week of July, the entire front had congealed. Assigned to II Canadian Corps, which was part of the British Second Army, the division assembled its brigades for combat while British and Canadian forces launched Operation Charnwood. It was a tactical success, but could not clear all of Caen of its German defenders. Although Caen had been a D-Day objective, fighting for the city continued into July; the remaining southern districts were occupied by British and Canadian forces on 19 July during Goodwood and Atlantic. In the aftermath, General Bernard Montgomery, commander of the Anglo-Canadian 21st Army Group, ordered elements of II Canadian Corps, commanded by Lieutenant-General Guy Simonds, to push forward towards Verrières Ridge, the dominant geographical feature between Caen and Falaise. By keeping up the pressure, Montgomery hoped to divert German attention away from the American sector to the west.

=== Operation Atlantic ===
Operation Atlantic, launched on 18 July alongside Goodwood, had the objectives of securing the western bank of the Orne River and Verrières Ridge. The 2nd Division's 5th and 6th Brigades were selected as the assaulting forces, with the 5th Brigade focusing on the Orne and the 6th on Verrières. The 4th Brigade was tasked with securing the flank of the operation, and the Royal Regiment of Canada attacked Louvigny on 18 July. Early on 19 July, the Calgary Highlanders seized Point 67, directly north of Verrières Ridge, and the following morning the Royal Highland Regiment of Canada crossed the Orne River and secured the flanks of the advance. In the afternoon, the 6th Brigade's South Saskatchewan Regiment attacked the well-entrenched German positions on the ridge, with support from Typhoon fighter-bombers and tanks. However, the attack ran into torrential rain, and the Germans counterattacked in force. This and further German attacks inflicted heavy casualties on the South Saskatchewan Regiment and its supporting battalions, the Essex Scottish Regiment and the Queen's Own Cameron Highlanders of Canada. On 21 July, the 5th Canadian Infantry Brigade reinforced Canadian positions on Point 67. In two days of fighting, the division suffered 1,349 casualties.

=== Operation Spring ===
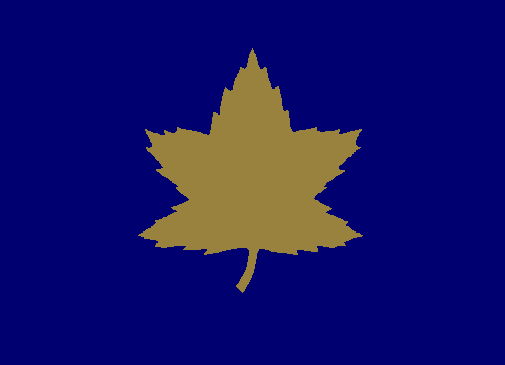
Formation sign used to identify vehicles of the 2nd Canadian Infantry Division

On 22 July 1944, Montgomery elected to use the Anglo-Canadian forces south of Caen in an all-out offensive aimed at breaking the German defensive cordon keeping his forces bottled up in Normandy. To meet Montgomery's objectives, Simonds was ordered to design a large breakout assault, codenamed Operation Spring. The attack was planned in three tightly timed phases of advance, pitting two Canadian and two British divisions against three German SS-Panzer divisions, and was to be launched in conjunction with an American offensive, Operation Cobra, scheduled to take place on 25 July 1944.

The 4th Brigade attacked in the east with some success, taking Verrières village itself, but was repulsed at Tilly-la-Campagne by German counterattacks. The 5th Brigade, in the centre, made a bid for Fontenay-le-Marmion; of the 325 members of the Black Watch who left the start lines, only 15 answered evening roll call. German counterattacks on 26 and 27 July pushed Canadian forces back to Point 67. However, the situation eventually eased for the 2nd Canadian Division as the US offensive, Operation Cobra, gathered pace. Throughout the first week of August, significant German resources were transferred from the Anglo-Canadian front to that of the U.S. Third Army, under Lieutenant-General George Patton, while reinforcements moved from Pas-de-Calais to the Falaise–Calvados area. By 7 August 1944, only one of the German armoured divisions that had opposed the Anglo-Canadians—the 12th SS Panzer Division Hitlerjugend—remained on the Canadian front.

=== Operation Totalize ===
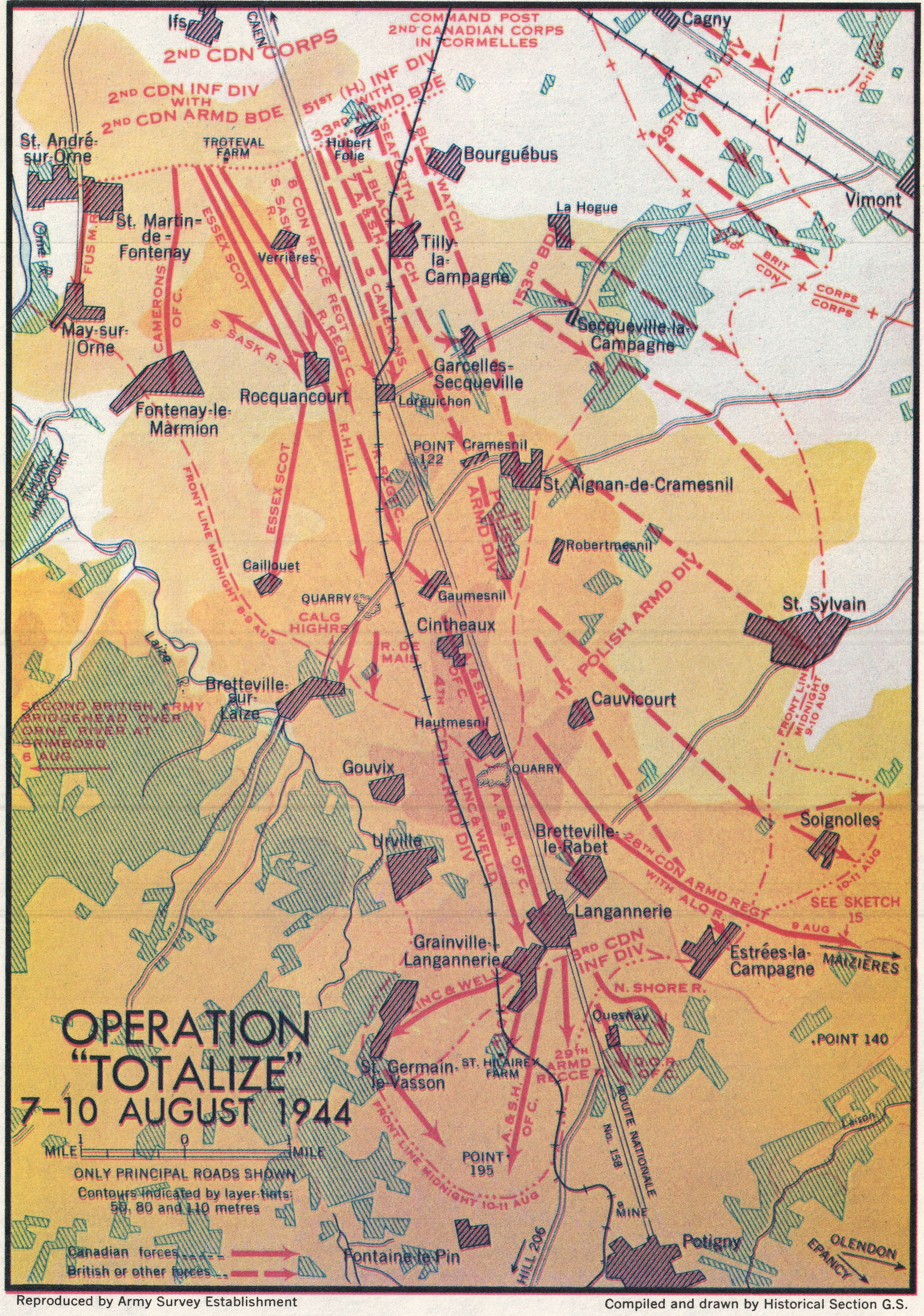
Allied advance south from Caen during Operation Totalize, 7–10 August 1944.

By 1 August 1944, the British had made significant gains on the Vire and Orne Rivers during Operation Bluecoat, while the Americans had achieved a complete breakthrough in the west. On 4 August, Simonds and General Harry Crerar—newly appointed commander of the First Canadian Army—were given the order to prepare an advance on Falaise. Three days later, with heavy bomber support, Operation Totalize began, marking the first use of Kangaroo armoured personnel carriers. While the 3rd Canadian Infantry Division attacked east of the Caen–Falaise Road, the 2nd Division attacked to the west. By noon, Verrières Ridge had finally fallen, and Canadian and Polish armour was preparing to exploit south towards Falaise. However, strong resistance by the 12th SS Panzer Division and the 272nd Infantry Division halted the advance. Although 12 km (7.5 mi) of ground had been gained, Canadian forces had failed to reach Falaise itself.

Simultaneously, the Germans had launched Operation Luttich, a desperate and ill-prepared armoured thrust towards Mortain, beginning on 6 August 1944. This was halted within a day and, despite the increasingly dangerous threat presented by the Anglo–Canadian advance on Falaise, the German commander Field Marshal Günther von Kluge was prohibited by Hitler from redeploying his forces. Thus, as American armoured formations advanced towards Argentan from the south, the Allies were presented with an opportunity to encircle large sections of the German Seventh Army. The First Canadian Army was ordered south, while the Americans prepared to move on Chambois on 14 August. Simonds and Crerar quickly planned a further offensive that would push through to Falaise, trapping the German Seventh Army in Normandy.

=== Operation Tractable ===
On 14 August, the First Canadian Army launched Operation Tractable with the aim of capturing Falaise and linking up with American forces in Chambois. The daylight attack began after medium bombers struck German positions and artillery laid smoke screens to cover the advance. The 2nd Division was not part of the initial assault, but its 6th Brigade was ordered to clear Falaise on 16 August; mopping-up operations in the town continued until early on 18 August. The encirclement of German forces in the Falaise Pocket was completed on 21 August, although substantial numbers had escaped during the preceding two days. German formations nevertheless suffered severe losses: by the end of Operation Tractable, the 12th SS Panzer Division had lost 80 per cent of its tanks, 70 per cent of its personnel carriers, and 60 per cent of its artillery.

Shortly afterwards, the 2nd Division moved to the Forêt de la Londe, along the valley of the River Seine. From 27 to 29 August, the 4th and 6th Brigades were engaged in heavy fighting against the rearguard of German forces seeking to withdraw across the Seine.

== The Channel Ports and the Scheldt ==
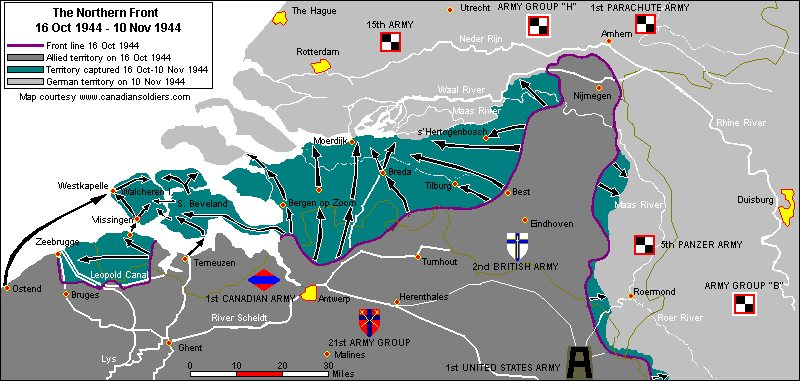
Canadian movements during the Battle of the Scheldt, October 1944

In September 1944, the First Canadian Army moved along the coast of France with the aim of securing the Channel Ports. On 1 September, while the 3rd Division made for Boulogne and Calais, the 2nd Division entered Dieppe, encountering virtually no resistance. Five days later, the division was tasked by Montgomery and Crerar with taking Dunkirk. The 5th Brigade captured Bourbourg and Loon-Plage and contained the roughly 10,000-strong Dunkirk garrison, while the 6th Brigade cleared Bray-Dunes and Ghyvelde. On 15 September, the division was ordered to Antwerp; it handed the Dunkirk sector to the British 4th Special Service Brigade on 18 September. Dunkirk remained in German hands until the end of the war.

Although the Belgian White Brigade, the 11th Armoured Division, and elements of the British 3rd Infantry Division had entered Antwerp as early as 4 September, taking the city and docks, a strategic oversight meant that the nearby bridges over the Albert Canal were not seized, leaving the Germans in control of the Scheldt estuary. The failure to make an immediate push on the estuary ensured that the logistically vital port would remain useless until the Scheldt was cleared. Strong formations of the German Fifteenth Army, which had withdrawn from the Pas-de-Calais, were able to consolidate their positions on the islands of South Beveland and Walcheren, as well as along the Albert Canal directly northwest of Antwerp, and were further reinforced by elements of Generaloberst Kurt Student's First Parachute Army.

During the initial phases of the battle, the 2nd Canadian Infantry Division forced crossings of the Albert Canal and Antwerp–Turnhout Canal. With Simonds temporarily commanding First Canadian Army, the division began its advance north from Antwerp towards the South Beveland isthmus on 2 October. By 6 October, it had crossed the Dutch frontier, but German resistance then stiffened around Woensdrecht. On Friday, 13 October, later known as "Black Friday", the 5th Brigade's Black Watch attacked along the railway embankment west of Woensdrecht; all four rifle-company commanders became casualties, and the battalion suffered 145 casualties. Three days later, the Royal Hamilton Light Infantry seized Woensdrecht after close fighting and held it against counterattacks. Beginning on 20 October, the 4th Canadian Armoured Division advanced towards Bergen op Zoom to clear the 2nd Division's flank; the movement helped force the Germans to withdraw from the Woensdrecht area. On 24 October, the 4th Brigade began Operation Vitality, advancing across the isthmus into South Beveland; the armoured division entered Bergen op Zoom on 27 October. By 31 October, the 2nd Division had cleared South Beveland and reached the eastern end of the Walcheren Causeway.

== Battles for the Rhine (November 1944–March 1945) ==
By November 1944, the First Canadian Army had entered the Nijmegen Salient, which was being held for use in the development of future offensives. The 2nd Division came under the command of Major-General Bruce Matthews, with Foulkes being transferred to command I Canadian Corps on the Italian Front. The First Canadian Army launched no major offensive operations from November 1944 to January 1945—the longest hiatus the Canadians had enjoyed since landing on the Normandy beaches the previous June.

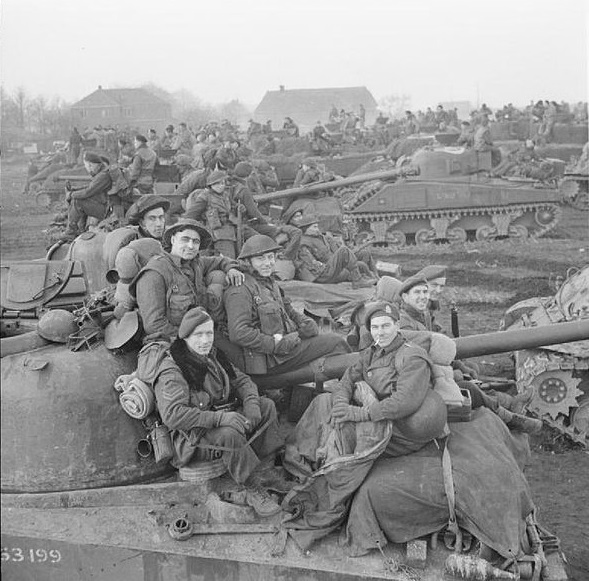
Sherman tanks of the 10th Armoured Regiment (The Fort Garry Horse) with infantry of the Royal Regiment of Canada massing in preparation for the assault on Goch, 17 February 1945

Operation Veritable was designed to bring the 21st Army Group to the west bank of the Rhine River, the principal natural obstacle before the Allied advance into central Germany. Initially scheduled for December 1944, the operation was delayed until February by the German Ardennes Offensive. Plans were developed to breach three successive defensive systems: the outpost screen; the Siegfried Line around the Reichswald; and the Hochwald Layback covering the approach to the ultimate objective of Xanten. The first phase began on 8 February 1945 behind an exceptionally large artillery barrage. The 2nd Division's 5th Brigade captured Den Heuvel and Wyler that day, opening the Nijmegen–Cleve road. The remainder of the division initially screened the wider corps front; its 4th Brigade re-entered the battle on 19 February along the Goch–Calcar road.

The next offensive called for the 2nd and 3rd Canadian Divisions to take the Hochwald and Balberger Wald. Following their capture, the 4th Canadian Armoured Division would sweep through the Hochwald Gap towards Wesel, followed by the 2nd Division advancing towards Xanten. Operation Blockbuster began on 26 February; despite initial gains, stubborn German resistance prolonged the battle. On 1 March, during intense close-quarter fighting in the northern Hochwald, Major Frederick Tilston of the Essex Scottish Regiment won the Victoria Cross. The division completed the occupation of the Hochwald on 4 March.

Operation Blockbuster's final phase was the attack on Xanten and the remaining German bridgehead, which lasted from 8 to 10 March. This fell primarily to the 2nd Division, supported by the 2nd Canadian Armoured Brigade, while the 43rd (Wessex) Infantry Division was temporarily placed under Simonds's II Canadian Corps. Despite a preceding artillery concentration, dogged German resistance caused an attritional battle in which the British and Canadians suffered heavy casualties. By 10 March, elements of the 2nd Division had linked up with the 52nd (Lowland) Infantry Division, bringing the offensive to a close. Canadian casualties during Veritable and Blockbuster totalled 5,304.

== North of the Rhine (March–May 1945) ==
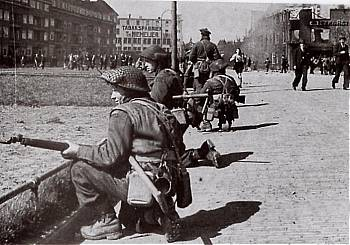
Canadian troops at Groningen

As Canadian forces had incurred heavy casualties in clearing a path to the Rhine, the 2nd Division was excluded from the large crossing operation that began on 23 March 1945, instead crossing unopposed a week later after a bridgehead had been secured. After a brief detour through German territory, the First Canadian Army—now unified with the arrival of I Canadian Corps from the Italian Front—prepared to assault German positions in the Netherlands. The 2nd Division advanced north towards Groningen, reaching the city's outskirts on 13 April. The defenders resisted fiercely in the built-up area, and the Canadians avoided bombing or shelling the city because of the risk to civilians. The German commander surrendered on 16 April; the four-day battle cost the division 209 infantry casualties.

On 18 April, the division began a 150-mile move east from Groningen to support the British advance on Bremen; by 20 April, it had concentrated south of Oldenburg. The 4th and 6th Brigades entered Oldenburg on 3 May after its defenders withdrew. The German instrument of surrender for the Netherlands, north-west Germany and Denmark was signed on 4 May, with hostilities to cease at 08:00 the following morning. At Reims on 7 May, Generaloberst Alfred Jodl surrendered all German forces to the Supreme Allied Commander; the surrender was formally ratified in Berlin on 9 May. In October 1945, after four months in the Netherlands, General Order 52/46 officially disbanded the headquarters of the 2nd Canadian Infantry Division. By December, the entirety of the division had been stood down and returned to Canada. The division suffered heavy casualties through 1944 and 1945; according to Bercuson, it had the "highest casualty ratio in the Canadian Army—from the time it returned to combat in early July 1944 until the end of the war".

== Commanding officers ==
The following officers were appointed to command the division:

- Major-General Victor Odlum (1940–1941)
- Major-General Harry Crerar (appointed 23 December 1941; never assumed command)
- Major-General John Roberts (1941–1943)
- Major-General Guy Simonds (1943)
- Major-General Eedson Burns (1943–1944)
- Major-General Charles Foulkes (1944)
- Major-General Bruce Matthews (1944–1945)

== See also ==
- Canadian Armed Forces
- Military history of Canada
- Military history of Canada during World War II
