= Channel Ports =

Seaports in England and France

The Channel Ports are seaports in southern England and northern France, which allow for short crossings of the English Channel. There is no formal definition, but there is a general understanding of the term. Some ferry companies divide their routes into "short" and "long" crossings. The broadest definition might be from Plymouth east to Kent and from Roscoff to Zeebrugge although a tighter definition would exclude ports west of Newhaven and Dieppe. A historic group of such ports is the Cinque Ports of south-east England, most of which have ceased to be commercial ports.

== Ports ==
=== England ===
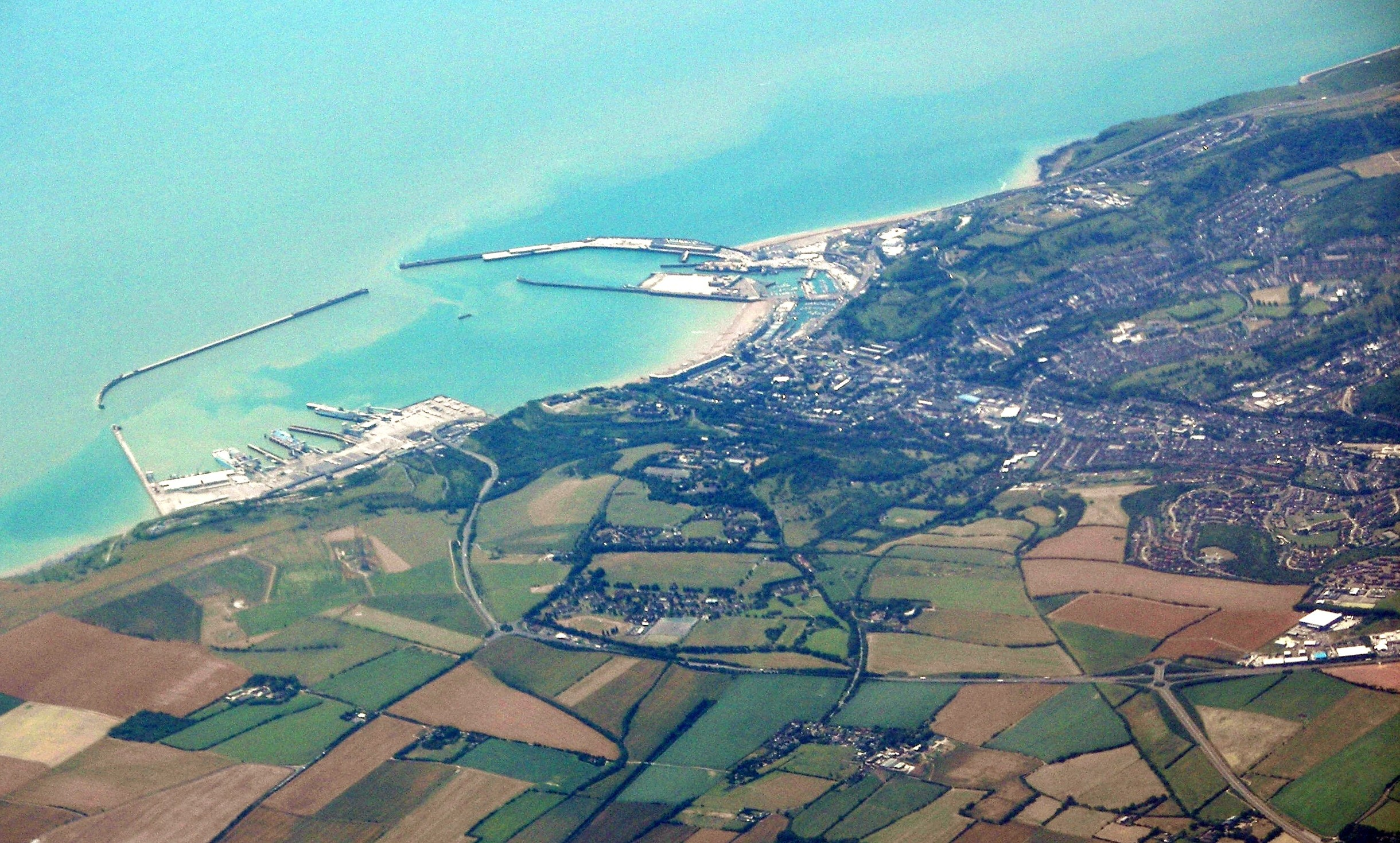
Aerial view of Dover harbour

The ports vary in size and their relative importance has fluctuated during recent history. Dover has established a lead in the cross-Channel ferry routes through its geographic position and development of its facilities and hinterland. This business has been sustained despite competition from the Channel Tunnel. Other minor ports in Kent and Sussex have retained some trade but these tend to be single routes, such as Newhaven–Dieppe.

Longer routes mainly radiate from Portsmouth but there are lesser ports at Poole and Plymouth, with routes to Normandy, Brittany and Spain.

=== France ===
The major French port with cross-Channel connections is Calais, with frequent sailings to Dover. Other close French channel ports include Dunkirk and Dieppe.

Longer routes are served from Le Havre, Caen, Cherbourg, Roscoff and St Malo. There are services to Ireland (Rosslare and Cork).

== Strategic importance ==
The ports are important commercial facilities, reinforcing connections between the British and European road systems. They are also vulnerable to industrial action such as strikes by port employees or blockades by disgruntled fishermen.

Their importance as military facilities was demonstrated during two World Wars.

=== World War I ===
During World War I the British and French Channel ports were major conduits for British materiel and troops.

The Belgian ports of Ostend and Zeebrugge were considered a major threat by British Admiral Admiral Jellicoe. He was concerned by their use not only as German U-boat ports, but also as torpedo boat bases and even possible departure points for a cross-Channel attack. This concern was transmitted via Whitehall to the British chief of staff on the Western Front, General Haig, for whom it merely confirmed the need for an offensive in Flanders, and eventually led to the Battle of Passchendaele (also known as the Third Battle of Ypres).

=== World War II ===
During World War II, likewise, the Channel ports provided major supply routes which had to be reopened in 1944. Dunkirk was the route from which British and Allied troops were evacuated in 1940; see Dunkirk evacuation. Dunkirk was left under siege until the general German surrender.

In September 1944, the First Canadian Army (Canadian, British, Polish, Czechoslovak and other national units) was to capture the ports from Le Havre to Zeebrugge. Dieppe and Ostende were undefended but major military actions were required for Le Havre (Operation Astonia), Boulogne (Operation Wellhit) and Calais (Operation Undergo). It took several weeks to bring the ports back into use at a time when Allied armies badly needed supplies.

== See also ==
- Operation Stack
- List of ports and harbours of the Atlantic Ocean
- Cinque Ports (in England)
- France–UK border
