= 99th Battalion (Essex), CEF =

The 99th Battalion (Essex), CEF, was an infantry battalion of the Great War Canadian Expeditionary Force. The 99th Battalion was authorized on 22 December 1915 and embarked for Great Britain on 31 May 1916, where, on 6 July 1916, its personnel were absorbed by the 35th Reserve Battalion, CEF to provide reinforcements to the Canadian Corps in the field. The battalion disbanded on 1 September 1917.

The 99th Battalion recruited in the County of Essex and was mobilized at Windsor, Ontario.

The 99th Battalion was commanded by Lt.-Col. T.B. Welch from 2 June 1916 to 5 July 1916.

The 99th Battalion was awarded the battle honour THE GREAT WAR 1916.

The 99th Battalion (Essex), CEF, is perpetuated by The Essex and Kent Scottish.

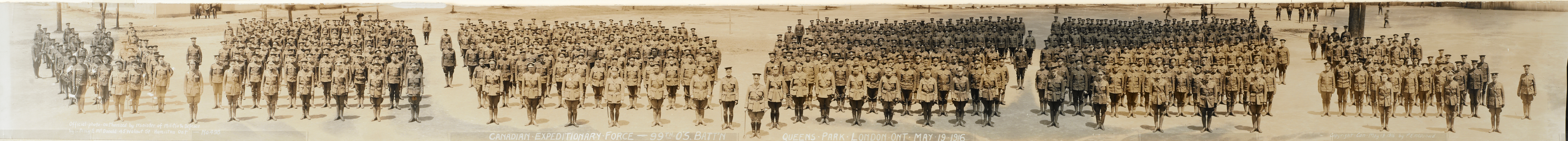

== Sources ==
- Canadian Expeditionary Force 1914–1919 by Col. G.W.L. Nicholson, CD, Queen's Printer, Ottawa, Ontario, 1962
