= 241st Battalion (Canadian Scottish Borderers), CEF =

Unit in the Canadian Expeditionary Force during WWI

The 241st (Canadian Scottish Borderers) Battalion, CEF was a unit in the Canadian Expeditionary Force during the First World War. Based in Windsor, Ontario, the unit began recruiting in the spring of 1916 in Essex County. After sailing to England in May 1917, the battalion was absorbed into the 5th and 12th Reserve Battalions in June, 1917. The 241st (Canadian Scottish Borderers) Battalion, CEF had one Officer Commanding: Lieut-Col. W. L. McGregor.

The 241st Battalion is perpetuated by The Essex and Kent Scottish.
