= 186th (Kent) Battalion, CEF =

The 186th (Kent) Battalion, CEF was a unit in the Canadian Expeditionary Force during the First World War. Based in Chatham, Ontario, the unit began recruiting during the winter of 1915/16 in Kent County, Ontario. After sailing to England in March 1917, the battalion was absorbed into the 4th Reserve Battalion on April 7, 1917. The 186th (Kent) Battalion, CEF had one Officer Commanding: Lieut-Col. Smith Neil.

The 186th Battalion is perpetuated by The Essex and Kent Scottish.

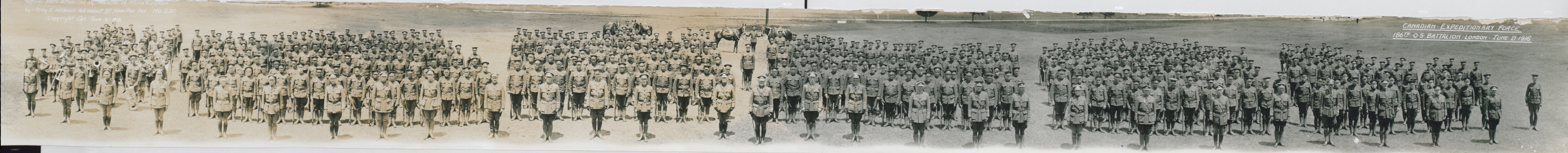

== Sources ==
- Meek, John F. Over the Top! The Canadian Infantry in the First World War. Orangeville, Ont.: The Author, 1971.
