= Frederick Albert Tilston =

Canadian Army Major (1906–1992)

Frederick Albert Tilston VC
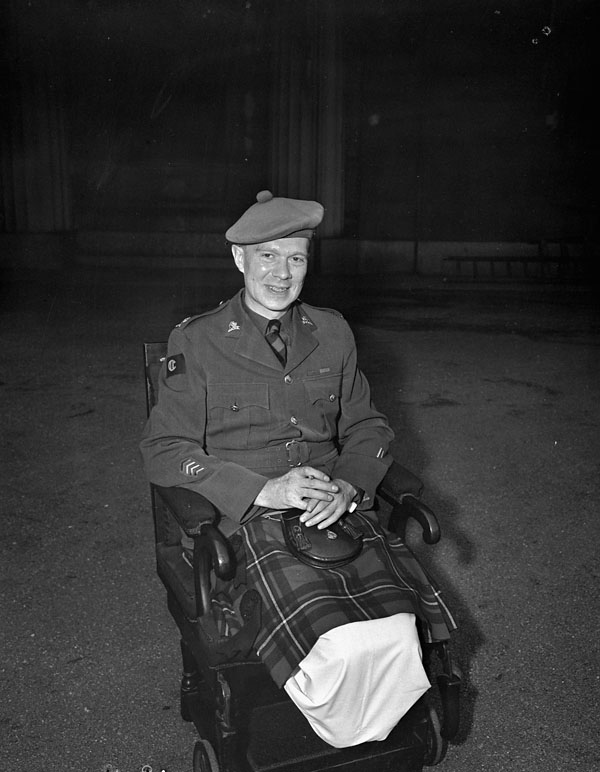
- Major Frederick A. Tilston, Essex Scottish Regiment, at an investiture during which he received the Victoria Cross, Buckingham Palace, London, England, 22 June 1945
- Born: 11 June 1906; Toronto, Ontario
- Died: 23 September 1992 (aged 86); Toronto, Ontario
- Burial place: Mount Hope Catholic Cemetery
- Military career
- Service years: 1940 - 1945
- Rank: Major
- Units: Essex Scottish Regiment
- Awards: Victoria Cross

Frederick Albert Tilston VC (June 11, 1906 – September 23, 1992) was a Canadian recipient of the Victoria Cross, the highest and most prestigious award for gallantry in the face of the enemy that can be awarded to British and Commonwealth forces.

== Early life ==
Tilston attended De La Salle College "Oaklands", an all-boys military prep school in Toronto, Ontario and was a graduate of the University Of Toronto and the Ontario College of Pharmacy. He got a job in pharmaceutical sales in Toronto.

== Military service ==
Tilston served in the Essex Scottish Regiment in an administrative role. By early 1945, he held the rank of acting Major. During the Battle of the Rhineland, he volunteered to go forward and lead an infantry company in an attack on German positions in the Hochwald Forest just west of the Rhine River.

On 1 March 1945, near Uedem, Germany, he led "C" Company in a 500-yard attack across muddy terrain soaked by recent rain and snow, through barbed wire and enemy automatic weapons fire. After being slightly wounded by shell fragments in the head, he personally destroyed one enemy machine gun position with a hand grenade, and led the men of C company on to a second German line of resistance when he was wounded for the second time in the hip. He struggled to his feet and led his men forward where the Essex Scottish overran the enemy positions with rifle butts, bayonets and knives in close hand-to-hand combat. While consolidating the Canadian position against German counterattacks and on his 6th trip from a neighbouring unit bringing ammunition and grenades to his company, which had been depleted to about 25% of its usual strength or 40 men, Tilston was wounded for the 3rd time in the leg. He was found almost unconscious in a shell hole and refused medical attention while he organized his men for defence against German counter-attacks, emphasized the necessity of holding the position at all cost, and ordered his one remaining officer to take command. For conspicuous gallantry and steadfast determination in the face of battle, Tilston was awarded the Victoria Cross.

== Later life ==
Due to his wounds sustained in the fighting, he lost both his legs and an eye. He joined The War Amps Association (a non-profit organization of "amputees helping amputees" in 1945.

He returned to his former place of business as vice-president in charge of pharmaceutical sales.

In 1957, he became president and CEO of Sterling Drug in Windsor, Ontario, overseeing its move to Aurora, Ontario in 1958. He served as president until 1970. He later moved from Aurora to Kettleby, Ontario before returning to Toronto.

He resided in Toronto, Ontario until his death on 23 September 1992. He was buried at Mount Hope Cemetery, Erskine Avenue, Toronto, Ontario, Canada in the Roman Catholic section. His headstone is located in Plot 23 in the north west corner.

== Legacy ==
Even into retirement Tilston was active throughout York County where a number of honours and memorials bear his name:

- The Aurora Royal Canadian Legion Branch 385 is named Colonel Fred Tilston VC Legion in his honour.
- The Cenotaph in Sharon, Ontario was unveiled by Tilston and bears his name.
- St. Andrew's College (Aurora, Ontario) gives out Tilston Awards each year, to students who have "shown courage in the face of adversity".
- The De La Salle Cadet Corps at De La Salle College (Toronto) 'Oaklands', Tilston's alma mater, has named its primary body of cadets the 'Tilston Platoon'.
- The Fitness and Sports Instructor 2011 senior cadet course in Cold Lake, Alberta has A1 Platoon named 'Tilston Platoon'.

A joint training facility for the Essex Kent Scottish Regiment and the Windsor Police Service at 4007 Sandwich Street, Windsor, Ontario, is a first-of-its-kind in Canada partnership with the federal government Department of National Defence (DND). In recognition of his service to the Essex Kent Scottish Regiment, the training centre is named the Major F Tilston Armoury and Police Training Centre.

Tiltson's Victoria Cross is currently held by the Royal Canadian Military Institute in Toronto.

A portrait of Tilston, painted by Canadian artist Brenda Bury, hangs in the Memorial Room at the Soldiers' Tower war memorial, University of Toronto.
