= 14th Canadian Hussars =

- Active: 1 April 1910–31 March 1968
- Country: Canada
- Branch: Canadian Militia (1910–1940); Canadian Army (1940–1968)
- Type: Hussars
- Role: Cavalry (1897–1939); Reconnaissance (1939–1968)
- Size: One regiment
- Part of: Non-Permanent Active Militia (1910–1940); Royal Canadian Armoured Corps (1942–1968)
- Garrison/HQ: Swift Current, Saskatchewan
- Nickname: "The Bucking Horse Regiment"
- Motto: Free And Fearless
- March: "Bonnie Dundee"
- Engagements: First World War; Second World War
- Battle honours: See #Battle honours

Commanders
- Notable commanders: George Tuxford

The 14th Canadian Hussars was a light cavalry and later light armoured reconnaissance regiment of the Non-Permanent Active Militia of the Canadian Militia and later the Canadian Army. First raised in 1910 as the 27th Light Horse, the regiment was redesignated in 1920 as the 14th Canadian Light Horse and again in 1940 as the 14th Canadian Hussars. On 31 March 1968, the regiment was reduced to nil strength and placed on the Supplementary Order of Battle.

One source claims the unit was the union of the 27th Light Horse and the 14th Canadian Mounted Rifles, but the official lineage shows no amalgamation in 1920, just a renaming of the 27th Light Horse. Authoritative lists of units in the Active Militia and the Canadian Expeditionary Force show no record of a "14th Canadian Mounted Rifles" – there were only 13 regiments of mounted rifles organized in the CEF. In any event, the 14th Canadian Light Horse in the 1920s was headquartered in Swift Current, Saskatchewan. It comprised 'A', 'B' and 'C' Squadrons based at Maple Creek, Swift Current and Shaunavon, respectively. In 1937 the regiment was designated a mechanized unit, and in 1940 the regiment was renamed the 14th Canadian Hussars. In 1941 an Active Service regiment was mobilized, and its members joined with other reconnaissance personnel in England to form 8 Recce.

== History ==
=== Early history ===
On 1 April 1910, the 27th Light Horse was authorized for service. The regiment had its regimental headquarters in Swift Current and had squadrons in Maple Creek and Swift Current.

=== First World War ===
On 6 August 1914, Details of the 27th Light Horse were placed on active service for local protection duties.

On 15 July 1916, the 209th (Swift Current) Battalion, CEF, was authorized for service. Based in Swift Current, Saskatchewan, it began recruiting in early 1916 in that city there and the surrounding district. After embarking for Great Britain on 1 November 1916, the battalion was absorbed into the 9th Reserve Battalion, CEF, on January 4, 1917. The 209th Battalion, CEF, had one officer commanding: Lieutenant-Colonel W.O. Smyth. The battalion was disbanded on May 21, 1917.

=== 1920s–1930s ===
On 15 March 1920, as a result of the post-war reorganization of the Canadian Militia following the Otter Commission, the 27th Light Horse was redesignated as 14th Canadian Light Horse.

=== Second World War ===
With the outbreak of World War II, the 14th Canadian Light Horse was not mobilized right away for service. On 1 August 1940, the regiment was redesignated as the 14th Canadian Hussars.

On 26 January 1941, the regiment mobilized the 14th (Active) Canadian Hussars, CASF, for active service. On 11 February 1941, the regiment was converted to armour and redesignated as the 8th Reconnaissance Battalion (14th Canadian Hussars), CASF, and later on 8 June 1942, as the 8th Reconnaissance Regiment (14th Canadian Hussars), CAC, CASF (abbreviated as 8 Recce). Formed from reinforcements from Canada and personnel of the 2nd Canadian Infantry Division in the United Kingdom, the regiment was organized as the reconnaissance regiment of the 2nd Canadian Infantry Division. On 7 July 1944, the regiment landed in France along with the rest of the 2nd Canadian Infantry Division, where it fought in North-West Europe until the end of the war. On 2 August 1945, the regiment was redesignated as the 8th Reconnaissance Regiment (14th Canadian Hussars), RCAC, CASF. On 15 December 1945, the overseas regiment was disbanded.

==== Formation and structure ====
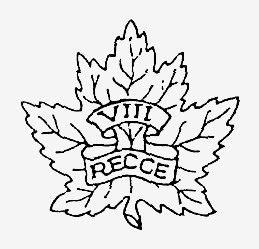
Regimental badge for 8 Recce, designed by its first commanding officer, Lt.-Col. C. Churchill Mann. This design forms the basis for the cap badge.

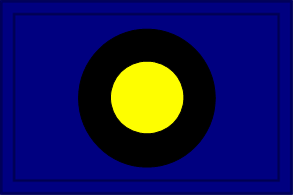
"Unit patch" for 8 Recce, worn on both shoulders of the battle dress. The bullseye is superimposed on the blue "formation patch" of the 2nd Canadian Infantry Division.

8 Recce was formed at Guillemont Barracks, near Aldershot in southern England, on March 11, 1941, by merging three existing squadrons within the division. Its first commanding officer was Lieutenant-Colonel Churchill C. Mann. Mann was succeeded as commanding officer on September 26, 1941, by Lieutenant-Colonel P. A. Vokes, who was in turn followed on February 18, 1944, by Lieutenant-Colonel M. A. Alway. The last commanding officer was Major "Butch" J. F. Merner, appointed to replace Alway a couple of months before the end of the fighting in Europe.

The regiment had its roots in the Militia component of the 14th Canadian Hussars. It had fostered an Active Service regiment in 1941, and its members joined with other reconnaissance personnel in England to form 8 Recce.

Following the pattern used in the Reconnaissance Corps of the British Army, 8 Recce was composed of a regimental headquarters (officially 26 men of all ranks at full strength), one headquarters squadron (222 men of all ranks) and three reconnaissance squadrons identified by the letters 'A', 'B' and 'C' (191 men each of all ranks). The Headquarters Squadron contained a squadron headquarters (6 men), an administrative troop (44 men), a signal troop (40 men), an anti-aircraft troop (9 men), an anti-tank troop (79 men) and a mortar troop (44 men).

Each of the three reconnaissance squadrons was composed of a squadron headquarters (36 men), three scout troops (38 men each) and one assault troop (41 men). The 12 troops in the reconnaissance squadrons were numbered, with Troops 1 to 4 in 'A' Squadron, Troops 5 to 8 in 'B' Squadron, and Troops 9 to 12 in 'C' Squadron. Troops 4, 8 and 12 were the assault troops. A reconnaissance squadron was commanded by a major assisted by a captain.

A scout troop comprised one reconnaissance section and two carrier sections. Each scout troop (38 men of all ranks) would usually be commanded by a lieutenant assisted by a second lieutenant. An assault troop (about 41 men of all ranks) contained four assault sections (8 men each). Each assault troop was commanded by a lieutenant assisted by a sergeant.

The nominal strength of the regiment was 42 officers, 71 non-commissioned officers and 708 other ranks for a total of 821 men of all ranks.

==== Primary mission, weapons and equipment ====
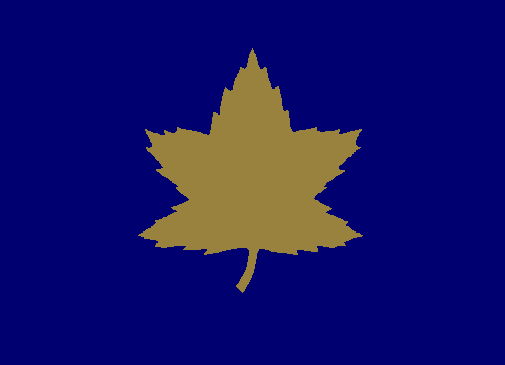
Formation sign used to identify vehicles of the 2nd Canadian Infantry Division

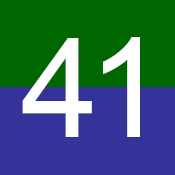
Unit sign used to identify all reconnaissance vehicles of British and Commonwealth units with infantry divisions

The primary mission of 8 Recce was to provide reconnaissance capabilities for the 2nd Canadian Infantry Division. Reconnaissance involves determining the location and capabilities of enemy units, and providing current information concerning the state of the theatre of operations (e.g., road and bridge conditions, alternative lines of advance). Weak enemy positions might be attacked if the opportunity arose, but strong-points are generally bypassed and left for assault units to tackle. Nevertheless, determining the position and strength of the rear guard of a retreating enemy, or the location and strength of newly established defence lines, will frequently draw fire and provoke combat situations. Unless the enemy is retreating in especially disorganized fashion, a lightly armoured reconnaissance unit is vulnerable to land mines and ambushes. Consequently 8 Recce, along with other reconnaissance battalions, had significant assault capabilities to allow it to rescue pinned down scout units.

After its formation in England, 8 Recce was equipped initially with BSA M20 motorcycles, 15-hundredweight and 3-ton Canadian Military Pattern trucks, the light Fox Armoured Car, automatic weapons and Wireless Set No. 19 for communication. The equipment was upgraded progressively during the three years of training in England to include more heavily armed armoured cars and a variety of weapons systems in response to the combat experience of other reconnaissance regiments in the Reconnaissance Corps. During the campaign to liberate northern France, Belgium and the Netherlands, the primary scouting vehicles of 8 Recce were the Mark IIIA Humber Armoured Car as well as the (from October 1944 onward) Daimler Armoured Cars. Although the ruggedness and speed of these lightly armoured wheeled vehicles was ideal for the reconnaissance role during the campaign across Northwest Europe, they were vulnerable to German antitank weapons, such as the 75-mm and 88-mm guns. Other major weapons deployed by 8 Recce included the Universal Gun Carrier, the M5 half-track, 2-inch light mortars, 3-inch mortars, 6-pounder anti-tank guns, PIAT portable anti-tank weapons, and heavy machine guns.

Toward the end of the war each scout troop was equipped with five armoured cars (three Daimlers and two Humbers) and seven Universal Gun Carriers (each mounted with one 0.5-inch (13 mm) M2 Browning machine gun heavy machine gun, replacing the original 0.303-inch (7.7 mm) Bren light machine gun). Each assault troop was equipped with five half-tracks, each carrying one .50-calibre heavy machine gun.

In accordance with the system of vehicle markings used by the British Army, the vehicles of 8 Recce were identified as belonging to a reconnaissance unit by the presence of a square "unit mark" containing the number 41 in white on top of a two-tone, green above blue background.

==== Action ====
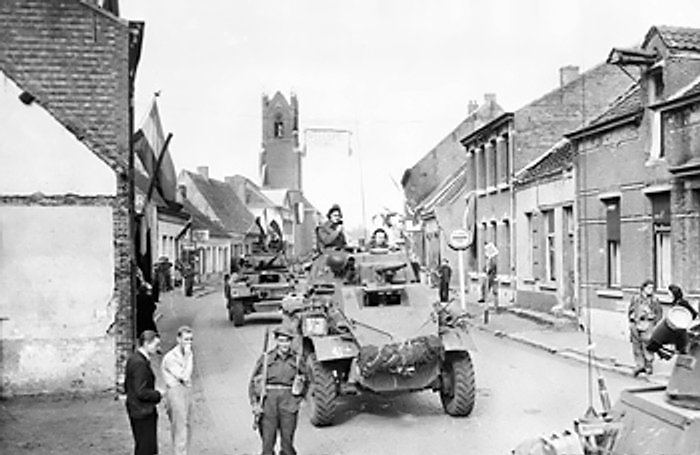
Canadian (likely from 8 Recce) Humber (foreground) and Daimler (background) armoured cars during the Battle of the Scheldt, Putte, on the Dutch–Belgian border, 11 October 1944

8 Recce spent the first three years of its existence involved in training and coastal defence duties in southern England. It was not involved in the ill-fated Dieppe Raid on August 19, 1942, and thus avoided the heavy losses suffered that day by many other units of the 2nd Canadian Infantry Division. The regiment landed with its division in Normandy on July 6, 1944, one month after D-Day, and first entered combat as infantry in the ongoing Battle of Normandy. The regiment's first three combat deaths occurred on July 13, two of which were incurred when a shell struck a slit trench sheltering two men near Le Mesnil-Patry. Another Trooper was killed during the Battle for Caen the same day from a mortar shell. (Note: The first three men killed in action were Trooper R. Owchar, Lance Corp. Gunnar Wium, and Trooper B. Isleifson. They are all buried in Bény-sur-Mer Canadian War Cemetery, according to the Commonwealth War Graves Commission. Trooper R. Owchar and Lance Corp. Gunnar Wium are buried beside each other.)

Following the near-destruction of the German Seventh Army and Fifth Panzer Army in the Falaise Pocket in August 1944, the remaining German forces were compelled into a rapid fighting retreat out of northern France and much of Belgium. 8 Recce provided the reconnaissance function for its division during the advance of the First Canadian Army eastward out of Normandy, up to and across the Seine River, and then along the coastal regions of northern France and Belgium. The regiment was involved in spearheading the liberation of the port cities of Dieppe and Antwerp; it was also involved in the investment of Dunkirk, which was then left under German occupation until the end of war. 8 Recce saw heavy action through to the end of the war including the costly Battle of the Scheldt, the liberation of the Netherlands and the invasion of Germany.

An early demonstration of the mobility and power of the armoured cars of 8 Recce occurred during the liberation of Orbec in Normandy. Over August 21 to 23, the infantry of the 2nd Canadian Infantry Division had succeeded in pushing eastward up to the west bank of the River Touques, but they were unable to expand an initial bridgehead across the river because of the presence of enemy positions in Orbec on the east bank. Humbers of 8 Recce had meanwhile scouted out possible river crossings northwest of the town. They succeeded in crossing the Touques, then circled back to Orbec and attacked the German defenders unexpectedly from the north and east. Enemy resistance in the town was rapidly overcome and the division's advance towards the Seine could resume.

The reconnaissance role of 8 Recce often put its members well ahead of the main body of the division, especially during the pursuit of the retreating German army across northern France and Belgium in late August and September 1944. For example, elements of 8 Recce entered Dieppe on the morning of September 1, 1944, scene of the disastrous Dieppe Raid of 1942, a full 12 hours before the arrival of truck-borne Canadian infantry. The liberation of Dieppe was facilitated by the withdrawal of the German occupying forces on the previous day. The unexpectedly early liberation allowed a planned and likely devastating Allied bombing raid on the city to be called off. 8 Recce was responsible for liberating many other towns in the campaign across northwest Europe.

During the Battle of the Scheldt, 8 Recce advanced westwards and cleared the southern bank of the West Scheldt river. In one notable action, armoured cars of 'A' Squadron were ferried across the river; on the other side the cars then proceeded to liberate the island of North Beveland by November 2, 1944. Bluff played an important role in this operation. The German defenders had been warned that they would be attacked by ground support aircraft on their second low-level pass if they did not surrender immediately. Shortly thereafter 450 Germans surrendered after their positions were buzzed by 18 Typhoons. Unbeknownst to the Germans, the Typhoons would not have been able to fire on their positions since the aircraft's munitions were already committed to another operation.

Shortly after midnight on the night 6–7 February 1945 (Haps, Holland), when 11 and 12 Troops of C Squadron patrolled and contacted each other and started back – 11 Troop patrol was challenged with halt from the ditch. Lance Corporal Bjarne Tangen fired a Sten magazine into the area from which the challenge came, and then he and the others quickly took up positions in the ditch, while the third member of their patrol ran back and collected the 12 Troop patrol, together with reinforcements from 12 Troop and returned to the scene of firing. The evening ended with the patrol taking one German prisoner and one deceased. The German prisoner, Lieutenant Gunte Finke, was interrogated, and he disclosed that he gave himself up after seeing the response of an estimated 30 men from the skirmish. The German intention was to verify information that armoured cars were in the area; not to bother with foot patrol or prisoners, but to attempt to "Bazooka one of our vehicles with the 2 Panzerfaust that their patrols carried". Lance Corporal Tangen was awarded the Dutch Bronze Cross and was mentioned in dispatches for this event.

On April 12, 1945, No. 7 Troop of 'B' Squadron liberated Camp Westerbork, a transit camp built to accommodate Jews, Romani people and other people arrested by the Nazi authorities prior to their being sent into the Nazi death camps. Bedum, entered on April 17, 1945, was just one of many Dutch towns liberated by elements of 8 Recce in the final month of the war.

8 Recce's last two major engagements were the Battle of Groningen over April 13–16 and the Battle of Oldenburg, in Germany, over April 27 to May 4. Three members of 8 Recce were killed on May 4, just four days before VE Day, when their armoured car was struck by a shell. (Note: The last three men killed in action were Trooper F. R. Mastel, Lieut. R. C. Mathison and Trooper A. A. Shepherd. They are buried in Holten Canadian War Cemetery in the Netherlands, according to the Commonwealth War Graves Commission.)

During the war 79 men were killed outright in action while serving in 8 Recce, and a further 27 men died of wounds.

=== Post war ===
After returning to Canada, the 14th Canadian Hussars resumed their role as an armoured regiment in the Canadian Army Reserve. On 19 June 1947, the regiment was redesignated the 8th Armoured Car Regiment (14th Canadian Hussars) and again on 19 May 1958, as the 14th Canadian Hussars. On 31 March 1965, the regiment's role was converted from that of an armoured regiment to a reconnaissance regiment. On 31 March 1968, as part of the major reorganization of the Canadian Armed Forces, the 14th Canadian Hussars was reduced to nil strength (virtually disbanded) and placed on the Supplementary Order of Battle.

== Perpetuations ==
- 209th (Swift Current) Battalion, CEF

== Lineage ==
- Originated on 1 April 1910, in Swift Current, Saskatchewan, as the 27th Light Horse.
- Redesignated on 15 March 1920, as the 14th Canadian Light Horse.
- Redesignated on 1 August 1940, as the 14th Canadian Hussars.
- Redesignated on 11 February 1941, as the 2nd (Reserve) Regiment, 14th Canadian Hussars.
- Redesignated on 1 April 1941, as the 8th (Reserve) Reconnaissance Battalion, (14th Canadian Hussars).
- Redesignated on 8 June 1942, as the 8th (Reserve) Reconnaissance Regiment, (14th Canadian Hussars), CAC.
- Redesignated on 2 August 1945, as the 8th (Reserve) Reconnaissance Regiment, (14th Canadian Hussars), RCAC.
- Redesignated on 19 June 1947, as the 8th Armoured Car Regiment (14th Canadian Hussars).
- Redesignated on 4 February 1949, as the 14th Canadian Hussars (8th Armoured Car Regiment).
- Redesignated on 31 July 1954, as the 14th Canadian Hussars (8th Armoured Regiment).
- Redesignated on 19 May 1958, as the 14th Canadian Hussars.
- Reduced to nil strength on 31 March 1968, and transferred to the Supplementary Order of Battle.

=== Lineage chart ===
Lineage chart

1910 | 27th Light Horse
1916 | 209th "Overseas" Bn, CEF
1916 | Absorbed by 9th Reserve Bn
1920 | 1st Regt, 14th Canadian Light Horse | 2nd Regt, (Note: Reserve) 14th Canadian Light Horse
1930 | 1st Regt (209th Bn, CEF), 14th Canadian Light Horse
1936 | 14th Canadian Light Horse | Disbanded
1940 | 14th Canadian Hussars
1941 | 14th (Active) Canadian Hussars, CASF | 2nd (Reserve) Regt, 14th Canadian Hussars
1941 | 8th Recce Bn (14th Canadian Hussars), CASF | 8th (Reserve) Recce Bn (14th Canadian Hussars)
1942 | 8th Recce Regt (14th Canadian Hussars), CAC, CASF | 8th (Reserve) Recce Regt (14th Canadian Hussars), CAC
1945 | 8th Recce Regt (14th Canadian Hussars), RCAC, CASF | 8th (Reserve) Recce Regt (14th Canadian Hussars), RCAC
1945 | Disbanded
1947 | 8th Armd Car Regt (14th Canadian Hussars)
1949 | 14th Canadian Hussars (8th Armd Car Regt)
1954 | 14th Canadian Hussars (8th Armd Regt)
1958 | 14th Canadian Hussars
1968 | Supplementary Order of Battle

== Organization ==
Subunit locations

=== 27th Light Horse (1 April 1910) ===
- Regimental Headquarters (Moose Jaw)
- A Squadron (Maple Creek)
- B Squadron (Swift Current)

=== 14th Canadian Light Horse (15 March 1920) ===
- Regimental Headquarters (Swift Current)
- HQ Squadron (Shaunavon)
- A Squadron (Maple Creek)
- B Squadron (Swift Current)
- C Squadron (Climax)

=== 14th Canadian Hussars (31 March 1968) ===
- Headquarters Squadron (Swift Current)
- A Squadron (maintained a detached troop at Vanguard until 1954) (Swift Current)
- B Squadron (maintained a detached troop at Gull Lake until 1954) (Maple Creek)
- C Squadron (maintained a detached troop at Frontier until 1954) (Shaunavon)

== Alliances ==
- United Kingdom 14th King's Hussars (Until 1922)
- United Kingdom 14th/20th The King's Royal Hussars (1922–1965)
- New Zealand 'Queen Alexandra's Mounted Rifles'

== Battle honours ==
The battle honours in small capitals were awarded for participation in large operations and campaigns, while those in lowercase indicate honours granted for more specific battles. Battle honours in bold type are emblazoned on the regimental guidon.

=== First World War ===
- **Ypres, 1915, '17**
- **Festubert, 1915**
- **Arras, 1917, '18**
- **Hill 70**
- **Amiens**
- Hindenburg Line
- **Pursuit to Mons**

=== Second World War ===
The battle honours of the 8th Reconnaissance Regiment are shown below. The battle honours in small capitals were awarded for participation in large operations and campaigns, while those in lowercase indicate honours granted for more specific battles. Battle honours in bold type are emblazoned on the regimental guidon.

- **Caen** (July 6–18, 1944)
- **Falaise** (August 7–22, 1944)
- Falaise Road (August 7–9, 1944)
- Clair Tizon (August 11 and 13, 1944)
- The Laison (August 14–17, 1944)
- **The Seine, 1944** (August 25–28, 1944)
- **Antwerp–Turnhout Canal** (September 24–29, 1944)
- **The Scheldt** (October 1 – November 8, 1944)
- Woensdrecht (October 1–27, 1944)
- **South Beveland** (October 24–31, 1944)
- The Rhineland (February 8 – March 10, 1945)
- **Twente Canal** (April 2–4, 1945)
- **Groningen** (April 13–16, 1945)
- **Oldenburg** (April 27 – May 4, 1945)
- **North-West Europe, 1944–1945**

== Notable members ==
- Brigadier-General George Tuxford CB CMG DSO ED
- Captain Bert Lawrence MC

== See also ==
- List of regiments of cavalry of the Canadian Militia (1900–1920)
