= Secqueville =

Secqueville may refer to:

- Garcelles-Secqueville, Calvados département, France
- Secqueville-en-Bessin, Calvados département, France
- Secqueville-Hoyau, a French automobile producer, 1919–1924
