= Cameron Highlanders =

Cameron Highlanders may refer to:

== Military units ==
=== Great Britain/United Kingdom ===
- The Queen's Own Cameron Highlanders (1793–1961), former infantry regiment of the British Army
- The Queen's Own Highlanders (Seaforth and Camerons) (1961–1994), former infantry regiment in the Scottish Division of the British Army
- The Highlanders (Seaforth, Gordons and Camerons) (formed 2006), infantry battalion in the Scottish Division of the British Army

=== Canada ===
- The Cameron Highlanders of Ottawa (Duke of Edinburgh's Own), infantry regiment of the Canadian Forces
- The Queen's Own Cameron Highlanders of Canada, infantry regiment of the Canadian Forces, headquartered in Winnipeg

== Other uses ==
- The people of the Cameron Highlands, a mountainous region in Malaysia
