= Queen's Own Cameron Highlanders of Canada =

The Queen's Own Cameron Highlanders of Canada
- Cap badge
- Active: 1910–present
- Country: Canada
- Branch: Canadian Army
- Type: Line infantry
- Role: Light role
- Size: Battalion
- Part of: 38 Canadian Brigade Group
- Garrison/HQ: Winnipeg
- Motto: Ullamh (Scottish Gaelic for 'ready')
- March: "The Piobaireachd of Donald Dhu" and "March of the Cameron Men"
- Anniversaries: Regimental birthday, 1 February 1910; Shankland's VC, 26 October 1917; Dieppe, 19 August 1942
- Engagements: First World War; Second World War; War in Afghanistan
- Battle honours: See #Battle honours
- Website: canada.ca/en/army/corporate/3-canadian-division/the-queens-own-cameron-highlanders-of-canada.html

Commanders
- Colonel-in-Chief: Vacant
- Commanding Officer: LCol M.A. Singleton
- Regimental Sergeant Major: CWO D.A. Nuessler

Insignia
- NATO Map Symbol
- Tartan: Cameron of Erracht
- Abbreviation: Camerons of C

The Queen's Own Cameron Highlanders of Canada is a Primary Reserve infantry regiment of the Canadian Army. It is part of the 3rd Canadian Division's 38 Canadian Brigade Group and is headquartered at the Minto Armoury in Winnipeg, Manitoba. It is the oldest highland regiment in Western Canada.

== Lineage ==
The regimental colour

The camp flag

=== The Queen's Own Cameron Highlanders of Canada ===
- Originated 1 February 1910 in Winnipeg, Manitoba as The 79th Highlanders of Canada
- Redesignated 1 April 1910 as The 79th Cameron Highlanders of Canada
- Redesignated 12 March 1920 as The Cameron Highlanders of Canada
- Redesignated 1 November 1923 as The Queen's Own Cameron Highlanders of Canada
- Redesignated 7 November 1940 as the 2nd (Reserve) Battalion, The Queen's Own Cameron Highlanders of Canada
- Redesignated 30 November 1945 as The Queen's Own Cameron Highlanders of Canada
- Redesignated 1 October 1954 as The Queen's Own Cameron Highlanders of Canada (Motor)
- Redesignated 11 April 1958 as The Queen's Own Cameron Highlanders of Canada

== Operational history ==
=== Great War ===
Details of The 79th Cameron Highlanders of Canada were placed on active service on 6 August 1914 for local protection duties.

The 79th Cameron Highlanders of Canada contributed one company to the 16th Battalion (Canadian Scottish), CEF (perpetuated by the Canadian Scottish Regiment (Princess Mary's).

The 43rd Battalion (Cameron Highlanders of Canada), CEF, which was authorized on 7 November 1914 and embarked for Great Britain on 1 June 1915. It disembarked in France on 22 February 1916, where it fought as part of the 9th Infantry Brigade, 3rd Canadian Division in France and Flanders until the end of the war. The battalion disbanded on 15 September 1920.

The 174th Battalion (Cameron Highlanders of Canada), CEF was authorized on 15 July 1916 and embarked for Great Britain on 29 April 1917. There, on 7 May 1917, its personnel were absorbed by the 14th Reserve Battalion, CEF to provide reinforcements for the Canadian Corps in the field. The battalion disbanded on 1 September 1917.

The 179th Battalion (Cameron Highlanders of Canada), CEF was authorized on 15 July 1916 and embarked for Great Britain on

3 October 1916. There, on 21 October 1916, its personnel were absorbed by the 17th Reserve Battalion, CEF to provide reinforcements for the Canadian Corps in the field. The battalion disbanded on 17 July 1917.

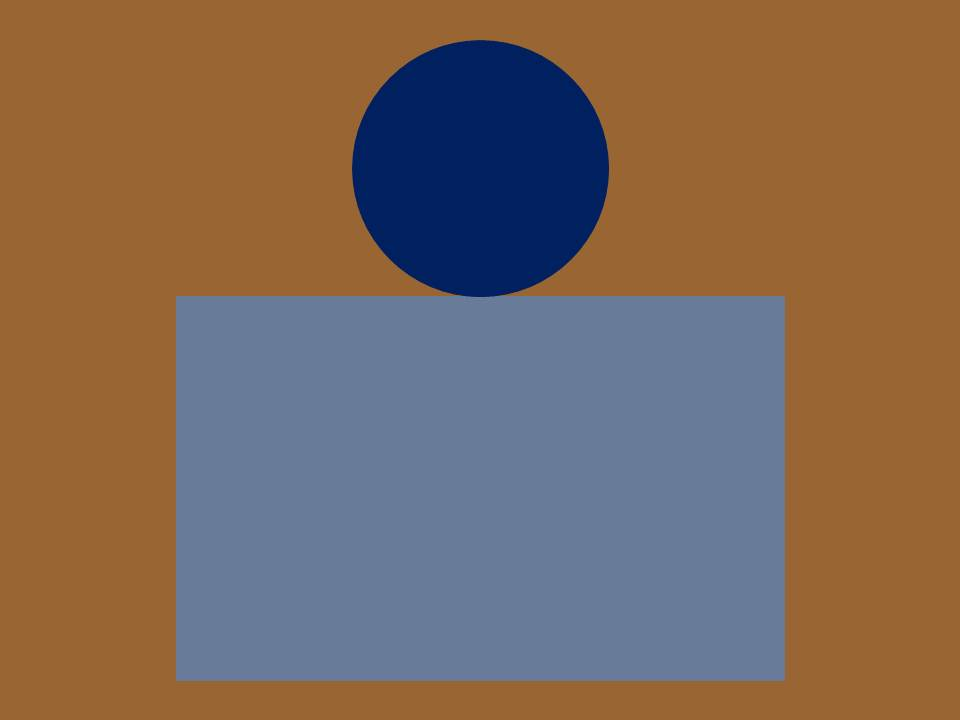
The distinguishing patch of The 43rd Battalion (Cameron Highlanders of Canada), CEF.

=== Second World War ===
The regiment mobilized The Queen's Own Cameron Highlanders of Canada, CASF for active service on 1 September 1939. It was redesignated as the 1st Battalion, The Queen's Own Cameron Highlanders of Canada, CASF on 7 November 1940. It embarked for Great Britain on 12 December 1940. The battalion took part in Operation Jubilee, the Dieppe Raid, on 19 August 1942. It returned to France on 7 July 1944, as part of the 6th Canadian Infantry Brigade, 2nd Canadian Infantry Division, and it continued to fight in North-West Europe until the end of the war. The overseas battalion disbanded on 30 November 1945.

=== Afghanistan ===
The regiment contributed an aggregate of more than 20% of its authorized strength to the various Task Forces which served in Afghanistan between 2002 and 2014.

== Perpetuations ==
=== The Great War ===
- 43rd Battalion (Cameron Highlanders of Canada), CEF
- 174th Battalion (Cameron Highlanders of Canada), CEF
- 179th Battalion (Cameron Highlanders of Canada), CEF

== History ==
=== Formation ===
As early as 1905 the local Scottish community in Winnipeg, led by the St Andrew's Society of Winnipeg, began lobbying the government to raise a Highland regiment. Under increasing pressure from the Scottish lobbyists the government relented and the initial steps taken to form Western Canada's first Highland regiment. On 29 September 1909, the prospective officers met and committees dealing with finances, uniforms and the band were formed. As the government grant did not cover the entire cost of uniforms and equipment, the Scottish societies and the officers undertook to raise the money themselves managing an initial amount of $25,000.00. Almost all of the original accoutrements were manufactured in Scotland, obtained from William Anderson & Sons Ltd. On 1 February 1910, the 79th Cameron Highlanders of Canada were officially gazetted, headquartered in the former Dominion Lands Office at 202 Main Street. On 9 October 1910, the regiment received its first stand of Colours, presented by Mrs D. C. Cameron, wife of the honorary lieutenant-colonel.

The availability of the number "79" was fortuitous and enabled the new Canadian regiment to adopt the regimental number of a famous regiment in Scotland, the Queen's Own Cameron Highlanders who had been raised in 1793 as the 79th (Cameron Highlanders) Regiment of Foot. Along with the regimental number the new Canadian regiment chose to also perpetuate the uniform of the Imperial Camerons. This association with the Queen's Own Cameron Highlanders became official on 31 January 1911, when His Majesty, King George V authorized the alliance of the two Highland regiments. On 22 June 1911, a contingent of 61 Camerons, parading with their allied regiment, participated in the coronation of King George V.

=== Great War ===
When the First World War broke out the Canadian Army did not mobilize based on its existing structure. Instead Sir Sam Hughes, the Minister of Militia created an entirely new table of organization with numbered battalions raised on geographical lines. This often meant that more than one militia regiment contributed men to a single new Canadian Expeditionary Force (CEF) Battalion. Under this mobilization plan militia regiments were to remain in Canada acting only as drafting units. Initially the Camerons were tasked with raising a company. The First Volunteer Overseas Company mobilized 7 officers and 250 other ranks under Captain John Geddes. This company mustered at Camp Valcartier to be formed into a battalion with companies from three other Canadian highland regiments, the 16th Battalion (Canadian Scottish), CEF. The Camerons next mobilized the Second Volunteer Overseas Company providing the second-in-command, Major D. S. MacKay, a company (10 officers, 250 other ranks) and a signals section for what would become the 27th (City of Winnipeg) Battalion (The Royal Winnipeg Rifles). It would not be until December 1914 that the regiment would be permitted to raise an entire battalion for overseas service.

On 18 December 1914, the Camerons received authority to raise a complete battalion for overseas service and the Volunteer Overseas Battalion was gazetted and mobilization commenced under command of Lieutenant-Colonel Robert M. Thomson. The battalion began training at Minto Armoury in Winnipeg and was soon re-designated the 43rd Battalion (Cameron Highlanders of Canada), CEF. On 29 May 1915 the battalion entrained for Montreal and deployment overseas. Embarking on HMTS Grampian on 9 June with a complement of 39 officers and 1,020 other ranks, the 43rd arrived in England on 8 June, disembarking at Davenport and proceeding by train to Lower St Martin's Plain, Shorncliffe. Arriving at the camp to find nothing ready for them, the Camerons set about pitching tents and setting up camp. The battalion made camp so expertly that they continued to be tasked to prepare camp for newly arriving units.

On 22 July the 43rd supplied a reinforcement draft of 386 other ranks to the 16th (Canadian Scottish) Battalion, the first of several. This loss of manpower placed the 43rd in peril of being broken up entirely and used as reinforcements. On 28 September the 43rd moved from the tented camp into huts at East Sandling. On 23 November the battalion was made into a reserve battalion and began taking casualties from the 15th and 16th Battalions on strength. Reinforced with the arrival of a number of drafts from the 79th Cameron Highlanders of Canada Drafting Detachment back in Winnipeg, the 43rd was brought back up to strength and reprieved from dissolution, ceasing to be a reserve Battalion on 24 January 1916. The casualties on its strength were transferred to the 17th Reserve battalion, and on 29 January, the 43rd entrained for Liphook, Bramshott Camp to join the 3rd Canadian Division.

Awarded the Distinguished Conduct Medal (DCM) for his actions at Sanctuary Wood in 1916 as a sergeant, Robert Shankland received a battlefield commission and continued to serve with the 43rd Battalion as an officer. On the morning of 26 October, he was the last officer to led his platoon forward to the crest of the hill. Once in position at the Bellevue Pillboxes, he could see that the remnant of "B" Company, in command of Sgt. Donald Mowat, along with additional men from "D" Company had captured the hill at the Bellevue Spur, the main trench line defending Passchendaele. Overrunning it and holding the position was critical to capturing the ruins of the town.

Although both flanks were eventually exposed, they held the position, withstanding incessant artillery shelling, German counterattacks and sustaining frightful casualties. In danger of being cut off and losing the vital position, Shankland turned over his command to another officer, and then returned to battalion headquarters, where he gave a first-hand report of the situation. He also offered a detailed plan on how a counterattack with reinforcements could best be achieved. He then returned to his men to hold the Spur while elements of the 43rd, now reinforced by companies of the 52nd and 58th Battalions captured the strong-points on both flanks. Once Bellevue Farm had been captured, Captain Galt, Officer Commanding "D" Company took over from Shankland, and Shankland returned to have his wounds dressed. For his actions that day Robert Shankland was awarded the Victoria Cross. Military Crosses were awarded to Capt. Donald A. Galt for attacking Bellevue Farm and later holding the Spur for two days; Lt. Edmund Smart of "A" Company for establishing a defensive flank and capturing a strong point (with four men) and taking eighty prisoners. And Distinguished Conduct Medals were awarded to Cpl. James Hainstock of "B" Company for his part in capturing the Spur, organizing a sniping defence, inflicting heavy casualties on the enemy assembling for a counter-attack, and for holding this position for two days; CSM Donald Mowat "A" Company, but attached to "B", for leading with three men in the capture of one of the Pillboxes on the crest of the Spur, and dressing wounded under fire.

On 12 January 1916, the 174th (Cameron Highlanders of Canada) Battalion, CEF was authorized and gazetted. As the regiment was focussed on raising the 179th Battalion the raising of the 174th was put aside until 30 May, when the battalion was organized with Lieutenant-Colonel James A. Cantlie in command. The 174th trained at Camp Hughes through the summer of 1917 and on 20 August, Lieutenant-Colonel Cantlie handed command over to Lieutenant-Colonel Hugh F. Osler, who had returned from serving with the 43rd Battalion in France. On 22 April, the battalion entrained at Winnipeg for overseas deployment and seven days later embarked on HMTS Olympic at Halifax for the Atlantic crossing. The 174th arrived at Liverpool on 7 May, where the battalion disembarked and proceeded by train to Upper Dibgate Camp. Upon arrival the 174th was absorbed into the 14th Reserve Battalion (formerly the 179th Battalion), and the men ultimately sent as reinforcement drafts for the 16th and 43rd Battalions serving with the Canadian Corps in France.

On 12 January 1916, the 179th (Cameron Highlanders of Canada) Battalion, CEF was authorized and gazetted under command of Lieutenant-Colonel James A. Cantlie. The nucleus of the 179th was formed from absorbing the 79th Cameron Highlanders of Canada Drafting Detachment on 1 February. On 30 May, Lieutenant-Colonel Cantlie, whose poor health precluded him from overseas deployment, relinquished command to Lieutenant-Colonel J. Y. Reid, and the battalion moved by train to Camp Hughes. Training at Camp Hughes throughout the summer of 1916, the 179th entrained for overseas deployment on 26 September. Arriving in Halifax, the battalion embarked on HMTS Saxonia on 4 October, and set sail for England. The 179th battalion arrived at Liverpool on 13 October, where they disembarked and proceeded to East Sanding Camp. On 4 January 1917, the 179th was re-designated the 14th Reserve Battalion and moved to Upper Dibgate Camp.

=== Between the wars ===
In 1920 a major reorganization of Canadian Militia units took place. Some units were disbanded, others were re-rolled or amalgamated and almost all numerical designations were dropped from regimental titles (the two notable exceptions being the 48th Highlanders of Canada and the Royal 22^{e} Régiment). Thus the 79th Cameron Highlanders of Canada became simply, the Cameron Highlanders of Canada. In order to perpetuate the regiment's accomplishments during the First World War, the regiment was reorganized as three battalions: the 1st Battalion "43rd Battalion CEF", 2nd (Reserve) Battalion (174th Battalion CEF) and 3rd (Reserve) Battalion (179th Battalion CEF). In reality the 1st Battalion was the only active militia unit. The 2nd and 3rd Battalions were reserve units where non-active personnel could transfer for an interim period or upon retirement and remain subject to future recall.

The popularity of Highland Regiments was at an all-time high in Canada after the First World War and a number of line infantry units chose to adopt Highland dress and customs. In 1920 The Ottawa Regiment (The Duke of Cornwall's Own) converted to a Highland Regiment adopting the title of The Ottawa Highlanders and the uniform of the Camerons. Steps were taken to form an alliance with the new Cameron Regiment in Ottawa and the alliance was formally granted in 1923. Subsequently, in 1933 The Ottawa Highlanders changed their name to The Cameron Highlanders of Ottawa.

On 24 October 1923, his Majesty King George V was "graciously pleased" to grant permission for the regiment to be named the Queen's Own Cameron Highlanders of Canada in recognition of the Regiment's exemplary service during the First World War. With granting of the royal designation "Queen's Own" the regiment decided to adopt badges that more closely resembled the pattern worn by the Queen's Own Cameron Highlanders of the British Army. The new cap badge depicted the figure of Saint Andrew holding in his arms a saltire (Saint Andrew's Cross), enclosed by a wreath of thistles and across the lower part of the wreath, scrolls inscribed: QUEEN'S OWN CAMERON HIGHLANDERS OF CANADA. New collar and sporran badges of a pattern identical to the Imperial Camerons were also chosen.

The new pattern badges were authorized by the War Office on 31 August 1925, and the cap and collar badges received by the regiment on 24 February 1927. The new pattern badges were held in stores pending the acquisition of the new sporran badge. With the sporran badges still yet to be acquired, the collar badges were finally issued in January 1930, and the cap badges towards the end of the year.

=== Second World War ===
On 1 September 1939, the Camerons were officially notified of the impending war. Within 17 days of being ordered to mobilize, the battalion was at full strength of 807 all ranks. This time the Camerons would not fight in their kilts as the regiment had 25 years earlier. A War Department directive issued in April 1940 made battledress the standard uniform for all units and the Highland regiments reluctantly surrendered their kilts for trousers. The regiment was increased to two battalions, the 1st Battalion being placed on active duty for overseas service as part of the 2nd Canadian Division and the 2nd Battalion to remain in Winnipeg to recruit and train replacements. On 16 December 1940, the 1st Battalion embarked for overseas on board the SS Louis Pasteur, arriving at Gourock, Scotland on Christmas Eve.

On 19 August 1942, the Camerons landed in occupied Europe as part of Operation Jubilee, the raid on the French port of Dieppe. The South Saskatchewan Regiment were to land in the first wave of the attack on Green Beach to secure the beach at Pourville, the right flank of the operation. The Queen's Own Cameron Highlanders of Canada would then land in the second wave and move inland along the eastern bank of the Scie River to meet up with the tanks of the Calgary Regiment coming from Dieppe and capture the airfield at Saint-Aubin-sur-Scie. The Camerons and the Calgary tanks would then clear the Hitler Battery and attack the suspected German divisional headquarters at Arques-la-Bataille.

The attack went in on time (04:50 hours) but the South Saskatchewan Regiment did not land astride the river as intended, but to the west of it. This did not pose a problem for the force aiming to clear the village and attack the cliffs to the west, but for the other force it meant they had to move through the village, cross the exposed bridge over the river before attempting to get on the high ground to the east. The delay this imposed meant that the Germans had time to react and deploy. "A" and "D" Companies of the South Saskatchewan Regiment took all their objectives, including a large white house on the western headland that proved to be some kind of officers quarters. The other two companies found that the bridge was swept by fire from a number of German pillboxes on the high ground facing them and the attack stalled as Canadian casualties mounted.

As the Camerons were the second wave to attack on Green Beach they came into an aroused German defence. The Camerons were riding in plywood landing craft. About 1,000 yd (910 m) off Green Beach, the craft formed in a single line and moved toward the beach. The German shore batteries, machine guns, and mortars opened fire. Above the angry roar of battle and the growl of racing engines came a sound that riveted the attention of U. S. Ranger Sergeant Marcell G. Swank. On a small forward deck of the landing craft to Swank's right, Pipe Major Alex Graham stood courageously playing A Hundred Pipers. "He stood there," recalled Swank, "defiantly telling the world that the Camerons were coming. God what a glory." Inspired by their piper, the Camerons landed on Green Beach with courage and élan and swept forward. This is the last recorded instance of Canadian troops being piped into battle.

The Camerons hit the Green Beach an hour after the South Saskatchewan Regiment, some 30 minutes late, as the commanding officer had not believed that the South Saskatchewan Regiment would be able to clear the beach and village in the allotted time. As they landed the commanding officer, Lieutenant-Colonel Alfred Gostling, was killed by a sniper and the unit was taken over by the second-in-command, Major A. T. "Andy" Law.

The majority of the force was mistakenly landed to the west of the river, so Law decided to alter the plan. Those that had landed to the east were told to join the South Saskatchewan Regiment, while the majority to the west advanced up the valley with Major Law. They were harassed on their journey by fire from Quatre Vents Farm and decided to seek shelter in the woods, through which, they reached the high ground above Bas d'Hautot. There they saw that the enemy already held the bridge at Petite Appeville in some strength (by a heavily reinforced anti-tank company from the 571st Infantry Regiment). Law's group could not now realistically take the bridge, nor could they bypass it, for the road from Ouville was now swarming with enemy reinforcements. Meanwhile, the rest of the Camerons had joined up with the South Saskatchewan Regiment but despite closing in on Quatre Vents Farm and the radar station they were halted by enemy fire.

Although the Camerons made the deepest penetration of the day, the main landing at Dieppe had been unsuccessful. By 09:30 hours a decision had to be made. The failure of the tanks to arrive had made it impossible for the Camerons to gain their objectives and suggested things were not going quite as planned on the main beaches. Faced with increasing German opposition and a complete lack of communication with higher headquarters, the Camerons began to fight their way back to Pourville, carrying their wounded. With Support Platoon leading, "A" Company guarding the flank and "C" Company forming the rearguard, the battalion made it back to Beronville Wood and re-established contact with the South Saskatchewan Regiment. It was only then that they found out the landing craft would not return for re-embarkation until 11:00 hours.

Major Law and Lieutenant-Colonel Merritt (Commanding Officer of the South Saskatchewan Regiment) set up a combined headquarters in the Grand Central Hotel, and prepared their battalions to stand and fight for a full hour against a rapidly increasing enemy, who had their line of withdrawal (the beach) enfiladed with fire from innumerable guns. The Camerons fought desperately to keep their foothold on the high ground to the west, while the South Saskatchewan Regiment grimly held on to a piece of high ground to the east. Slowly the Germans collapsed the pocket smaller and smaller, until they dominated the entire beach and the slopes east of Pourville. By this time, few of the Camerons and South Saskatchewan Regiment were unwounded. At 11:00 hours the landing craft began to arrive, taking grievous losses on the approach into the beach. More men were killed and wounded as they tried to board the landing craft under the enemy's withering fire. Almost miraculously five landing craft and one tank landing craft managed to rescue men from the shallows and cleared the beach with full loads. By 11:30 hours the situation had become impossible and no further extractions were attempted.

Of 503 Camerons on the raid, 346 were casualties: 60 killed in action; 8 died of wounds after evacuation; 167 prisoners of war (8 of whom died of wounds). Of the 268 returning to England, 103 were wounded. 25 Camerons were decorated for their actions at Dieppe. The regiment received two Distinguished Service Orders (the second highest award for bravery for officers after the Victoria Cross), two Military Crosses, three Distinguished Conduct Medals (the second highest award for bravery for non-commissioned members after the Victoria Cross), four Military Medals, thirteen Mentions in Dispatches and a Croix de Guerre with bronze palms. One of the Distinguished Service Order recipients was the acting commanding officer, Major Law.

On 7 July 1944, the battalion was back in France, landing at Graye-sur-Mer, Calvados as part of the 6th Canadian Infantry Brigade, 2nd Canadian Infantry Division. On the evening of 11 July, the unit moved to the vicinity of Rots and then relieved the Queen's Own Rifles of Canada at Carpiquet the next day. The next six days the battalion spent digging in to avoid enemy shelling and patrolling to root out enemy snipers and remnants. On 19 July, the battalion left Carpiquet for an assembly area across the Orne River in preparation for the start of Operation Atlantic the next day. On the way to the start line, the battalion suffered casualties from enemy artillery and mortar fire. The Camerons launched their attack from Fleury-sur-Orne, supported by artillery and Typhoon squadrons. "A" Company advanced on the right with "B" Company left, "C" Company in depth and "D" Company in reserve. No tanks accompanied the attacking infantry but a squadron of tanks from The Sherbrooke Fusiliers was allotted to the Camerons for counter-attack. The attack did not start well. The Officer Commanding Headquarters Company, Captain H. Grundy and the Intelligence Officer, Lieutenant J. Maloney were both killed when an enemy 88 mm gun hit the scout car. The Battalion War Diary for June was lost with the vehicle. The loss of this command vehicle would hamper the Battalion's radio communications throughout the battle. "A" Company was held up 500 yd (460 m) from the start line, coming under intense machine gun fire. Suppressing the enemy machine gunners with artillery and medium machine gun fire from The Toronto Scottish Regiment, "A" Company was able to carry on. "B" Company encountered mild resistance and reached its objective advancing through the sniper, mortar and machine gun fire. As "A" Company had ended up somewhat to the right of their objective "C" Company was pushed through to fill the gap between "A" and "B". "C" Company met no resistance until it reached the south end of the village. "D" Company moved up to secure the rear of the battalion position.

The enemy still held part of Hill 112 and continued to subject the Camerons to very heavy fire from west of the Orne. Heavy rain interfered with radio communications that were already affected by the loss of the scout car. With three companies forward, the Camerons held a wide frontage, so the commanding officer ordered "C" and "B" Companies to withdraw slightly to draw in the perimeter. "B" Company was shifting their positions when the Germans counter-attacked. The company managed to consolidate in their new position, but sustained significant casualties. As a result, the commanding officer moved "D" Company up to replace them, and moved "B" back as Battalion reserve. Elements of the I SS Panzer Corps counter-attacked along the entire Battalion front, with especially heavy concentrations of infantry thrown against "A" and "D" Companies. Towards dusk a heavy counter-attack supported by eight Panzerkampfwagen V (Panther) tanks was launched against "D" Company. Three of the Cameron anti-tank guns were knocked out, but the Camerons destroyed two of the panzers with PIATs (Projector Infantry Anti-Tank). "D" Company was overrun and forced to withdraw to link up with the remains of "B" Company. Overnight on 20–21 July "A" and "C" Companies beat back repeated counter-attacks. At times the opposing forces were within shouting distance of each other.

In the morning, further counter-attacks by small groups of tanks were fought off on the left flank in "C" Company's area. 10 Platoon of "B" Company was entirely cut off from the rest of the battalion as the battle raged around the perimeter of the orchard. A company of German infantry, that had infiltrated across the river overnight, launched a series of small attacks against the battalion headquarters, which were beaten off with many prisoners being taken by "A" Company and the Scout Platoon. The Germans continued to counter-attack on 22 July, but their strength was reduced. Attacks by two or three tanks supported by small groups of infantry were beaten off throughout the day. At one point "A" Company was forced to withdraw, but with the assistance of heavy artillery support, counter-attacked and regained their positions. 11 Platoon was sent from "B" Company to reinforce "C" Company in driving off an enemy attack and remained under command of "C" Company, taking up defensive positions on the left flank. In between counter-attacks the Germans subjected the Cameron positions to heavy shelling with artillery, mortars and Nebelwerfers (rockets). By 23 July the counter-attacks had dwindled to minor infiltrations that were easily handled and the Germans resorted to increased shelling. "C" Company was so reduced by this time that the remainder of 10 Platoon was sent from "B" Company to reinforce it.

The Camerons suffered heavy casualties in the fighting for Saint-André-sur-Orne: 52 wounded (including the commanding officer and the officer commanding "B" Company) and 29 killed. Company Sergeant Major Sutherland and Private G. T. Munroe were each awarded the Military Medal for their actions at Saint-André-sur-Orne and the commanding officer, Lieutenant-Colonel N.H. Ross, was awarded the Distinguished Service Order for his handling of the battalion throughout the battle.

On 24 July, the battalion was placed under command of 5 Brigade to secure the start line for the brigade's attack on May-sur-Orne and Fontenay-le-Marmion. A composite force from "B" and "D" Companies under Major Lane met fierce resistance and reinforcements were needed before the start line was secured. Still under 5 Brigade, the Camerons had elements of The Black Watch of Canada and The Calgary Highlanders placed under command on 25 July, to occupy Saint Martin to protect the left flank of le Régiment de Maisonneuve attacking May-sur-Orne. The Maisonneuve attack was unsuccessful and that evening they relieved the Camerons in Saint Martin.

On 26 July, the Camerons returned under command of 6th Brigade and set about consolidating their positions in Saint-André-sur-Orne. On 31 July, the unit started rotating companies out of the line two at a time for rest and refit. "A" and "C" Companies remained in Saint-André-sur-Orne under command of Les Fusiliers Mont-Royal while the remainder of the unit was withdrawn to Caen for rest. Even in the rest area the unit was subject to enemy artillery and was required to dig in to minimize casualties.

On 1 August, Battalion Headquarters and "B" and "D" Companies were resting in the vicinity of Faub-de-Vaucelle while "A" and "C" Companies were still under command of Les Fusiliers Mont-Royal in Saint-André-sur-Orne. That evening "B" and "D" Companies relieved "A" and "C" Companies and provided support to Les Fusiliers Mont-Royal in capture of a church in the vicinity that was occupied by the Germans. On 3 August, "B" and "D" Companies assisted Les Fusiliers Mont-Royal in taking a group of houses that had been identified as being occupied by the Germans by Cameron patrols the night before.

On the 2nd Canadian Division front the mine directly south of Saint-Martin-de-Fontenay had been a constant threat, the lofty shaft towers affording the Germans excellent observation and the mine tunnels offering a means of infiltrating the whole area. On the night of 3–4 August, "A" Company with a detachment of the 11th Field Company, Royal Canadian Engineers, conducted a raid on an enemy occupied mine. The company succeeded in surrounding the mine despite heavy machine gun fire but the accompanying engineers were unable to demolish the mine shaft. In order to demolish the shaft towers, the sappers had to climb some 20 ft (6.1 m) from the ground and as soon as they did so they became targets for snipers in the bright moonlight. After a number of men had been hit, it was decided that the demolition task could not be carried out, and the raiding party withdrew. Casualties suffered on the raid were 9 missing and 21 wounded which speaks to the fierceness of the resistance. Three prisoners from the 2nd SS Panzergrenadier Regiment of the 1st SS Division Leibstandarte SS Adolf Hitler (one corporal, one lance corporal and one private) were taken during the raid.

On 4 August, Lieutenant-Colonel Runice took command of the battalion, and that night the Camerons moved to Verrières to relieve The Essex Scottish Regiment. The next two days were relatively quiet with the unit patrolling and receiving only occasional shelling from the enemy. A prisoner from the 1055th Grenadier Regiment of the 89th Infantry Division was captured by patrol from "C" Company.

The battalions of the 6th Brigade had been tasked to attack the villages forming the front line. On the afternoon of 7 August, the Camerons moved to a forming up position near Ifs in preparation for an attack against Fontenay-le-Marmion that night. "D" and "C" Companies led the attack with "B" Company in close support and "A" Company in reserve. "D" Company had a difficult time securing their objective. Within ten minutes of crossing the start line, 16 Platoon was pinned down by intense machine gun fire. When 18 Platoon conducted a left flanking attack to free up 16 Platoon, they came under intense 88 mm mortar fire pining them down as well. The company crawled forward into an assault line and then launched an all-out frontal attack, fighting their way into the village against fierce opposition by elements of the German 89th Infantry Division.

By 01:00 hours "D" Company had reached their objective, the first company to do so, and began preparing for counter-attacks. "C" Company had their own difficulties in the assault. 13 and 14 Platoon were temporarily cut off from 15 Platoon and "C" Company headquarters when they advanced past a nest of enemy machine gun posts. The enemy allowed the forward platoons to pass and then poured heavy fire into "C" Company Headquarters and remaining platoon, which after sustaining several casualties, bypassed the machine gun posts by working their way around the left flank. "C" Company Headquarters and 13 Platoon reached their objective, the orchard, hoping to find the other two platoons but only encountered elements of "B Company". Linking in their defensive positions with "B" Company on the east side of the orchard, they prepared to fight off the inevitable enemy counter-attack. Almost immediately after crossing the start line, "B" Company came under fire from both sides of the road. In response "B" Company launched a determined attack on the quarry, where a concentration of enemy were dug in, with 11 Platoon forward, 10 Platoon left and 12 Platoon right. Sergeant J. Mahon was later awarded the Military Medal for his actions in the fight for the quarry. Once they had cleared the enemy from the quarry, "B" Company continued on to the outskirts of Fontenay-le-Marmion to link up with the remnants of "C" and "D" Companies occupying the buildings.

The Camerons holding Fontenay-le-Marmion were under fire from heavy sniping and direct fire from a German 88 mm gun to the northeast and the number of casualties grew. Engaged in heavy house-to-house fighting through the night and into the morning, the battalion, down to 150 men, fought off numerous enemy counter-attacks. Battalion headquarters was hit by an enemy 88 mm, wounding the commanding officer. Overnight 14 men from 14 Platoon and one from 13 Platoon who had worked their way back to the start line were brought up to rejoin "C" Company, and Major C. W. Ferguson, a Cameron serving as brigade major of 6th Brigade, was sent to take over the battalion. On the morning of 8 August, the enemy counterattacked from the north with 12 Tiger Tanks and the unit was temporarily surrounded. To add to the chaos, battalion headquarters was hit again likely by the same 88 mm that had been shelling the unit from the start of the battle. The new commanding officer was wounded, forcing Major J. J. D. Gagnon, Officer Commanding "D" Company to assume command.

On the afternoon of 8 August, two companies of the South Saskatchewan Regiment with a squadron of the 1st Hussars broke through, swept the ridge north of Fontenay and cleared the left flank, relieving the pressure on the Camerons. The Camerons captured 207 enemy prisoners that day. That night Cameron patrols confirmed that the enemy had withdrawn. On the morning of 9 August "B" Company (under Company Sergeant Major Abram Arbour) launched a successful attack on the right flank and "A" Company captured a barracks on the high feature that was the source of the heavy fire that was pinning whole Battalion down. The clearing weather allowed Royal Air Force Typhoons to locate and destroy the German 88 mm that had been wreaking so much havoc on battalion headquarters.

In the evening Major E. P. "Tommy" Thompson assumed acting command of the battalion. In the fierce fighting for Fontenay-le-Marmion, the Camerons lost two commanding officers wounded (Ferguson would die from his wounds the next day), and two company commanders, Major E. R. Talbot of "C" Company and Major J. E. E. McManus of "B" Company and the adjutant, Captain G. Kidd, wounded in action. The carrier platoon commander, Captain R.R. Counsell, was awarded the Military Cross for keeping the companies supplied during the fighting and Company Sergeant-Major Arbour was awarded the Military Cross (a decoration usually awarded to officers) for his actions as acting company commander of "B" Company during the battle.

The remainder of 9 and 10 August, were spent resting and reorganizing prior to relieving The North Nova Scotia Highlanders at Gouvix the next day. Patrols the night of 9 August, brought in a couple of prisoners – one from the 1056th Infantry Regiment and the other from the 189th Anti-Tank Battalion. At dawn on 12 August, "B" Company stood-to, only to discover it was completely surrounded by an enemy patrol. A brief skirmish ensued and the enemy withdrew. Later that day the new commanding officer, Lieutenant-Colonel A. S. Gregory arrived to assume command.

In the early morning of 14 August, the battalion launched an attack to clear enemy pockets west of the River Laize and seize a bridgehead across the river at Clair Tizon. Initially resistance was light but stiffened as the Camerons approached the river. The Battalion's objective was seized by 09:10 hours and that night the anti-tank platoon got their first kill – a Panzerkampfwagen V (Panther) that was knocked out at a range of about 250 yd (230 m). Two of the crew were killed and the remainder taken prisoner by Scout Platoon snipers who were in the area. Numerous prisoners of war were taken in the operation, many of them Poles and Russians who were happy to desert from their impressed service in the Wehrmacht.

The next day, 15 August, the Camerons took Saint-Martin-de-Bienfaite-la-Cressonnière and held it against three fierce counter-attacks by elements of the 12th SS Panzer Division Hitlerjugend. One of only two Bronze Stars awarded to members of the regiment during the war was won during the battle for Saint-Martin-de-Bienfaite-la-Cressonnière. Private J. P. DeGarmo was awarded the American decoration for his actions.

That afternoon bombers from No. 6 (RCAF) Bomber Group dropped bombs on enemy pockets of resistance between the Cameron lines and Falaise. Several bombs fell short, landing on battalion headquarters and inflicting eight casualties. More casualties were suffered when the Regimental Aid Post was shelled by an enemy 88 mm. The medical officer, Captain H. Marantz, and Sergeant G. A. Wilwand were both killed and the remainder of the Aid Post wounded. 10 Field Ambulance put together a composite force and sent it forward to act as the Cameron Regimental Aid Post.

The task of taking the ruins of Falaise fell to 6 Brigade. At 15:00 hours on 16 August, Brigadier Young launched his attack with the South Saskatchewan Regiment on the left and the Camerons on the right, each supported by a squadron of tanks from the Sherbrooke Fusiliers. As the battalion moved towards Falaise, they ran into a group of 25 enemy of which 2 were taken prisoner. The huge craters caused by the earlier RAF bombing impeded the advance. Moreover, parties of the enemy from the 12th SS Panzer Division were still fighting hard in the ruins. By the morning of 17 August, the South Saskatchewans had reached the railway east of the town. The Camerons had not advanced as rapidly, their tanks being hung up in craters; but they finished their task that day and then moved south across the River Traine to establish a defensive position around the village of Hérouville-Saint-Clair. Many enemy prisoners of war were taken (a number from the 978th Grenadier Regiment) and a scout car that had run out of gas was captured as well. That night a flight of U.S. Army Air Force P-38 Lightnings bombed and strafed the unit killing two and wounding six.

On 18 August, contact was firmly established with Les Fusiliers Mont-Royal. The relative quiet allowed hot meals, mail and new clothing to be enjoyed by all members of the unit. The pause also allowed the commanding officer to reorganize the battalion in preparation for future operations. Patrols from the unit netted a number of prisoners (two from the 1056th Infantry Battalion, one from the 128th Grenadier Regiment, one from the 937th Infantry Reserve Regiment and one from the 453rd Reserve Grenadier Battalion). On 19 August, the battalion moved to a new location near Les Moutien on Auges by the Dives River and then on to an assembly area at le Grand Mesnil on 21 August. That night they moved again, this time to a position near Meulles. On 22 August, the battalion pushed towards Orbec, slowing as they met increasingly stiff opposition and heavy fire from the high ground across the Orbec River. Spending the night near Les Bois, southwest of Orbec, the Camerons launched a left flanking attack north of Orbec the next day. Seizing their objective, the battalion fought off counter-attacks by enemy infantry supported by tanks and self-propelled guns. After having two tanks and a self-propelled gun knocked out, the Germans withdrew, leaving the unit in firm possession of Orbec. The Camerons were greatly assisted in the taking of the town by the 8th Reconnaissance Regiment (14th Canadian Hussars), who had crossed the river to the west of the town and then circled back and taken out an enemy blocking position from the rear. With the withdrawal of the enemy, two Cameron scouts were finally able to emerge from the town jail where they had been hiding with a German commander and his staff that they had captured, waiting for the battalion to capture the town.

On 24 August, the Camerons marched to an assembly area at Le Ruquesni where they were picked up by trucks and moved to the 6 Brigade area at Ducore. That night they moved again to an area north of Saint-Pierre-de-Salerne where they were warned to be prepared to move south into Brionne. On 25 August, the battalion moved into Brionne against slight resistance and received a hearty welcome by the townspeople. Previous to this the towns the battalion had liberated had been abandoned by the inhabitants. Brionne was the first of many towns to greet the Camerons as liberators. On 26 August, the battalion was on the move again, taking up positions for the night along the Seine near Bourgtheroulde. The next day the Camerons continued the advance through Bourgtheroulde, meeting determined resistance as the German rearguard fought fanatically to protect their line of retreat across the Seine. By late evening the battalion had consolidated their position near La Chênaie, overlooking the Seine and effectively cutting off the German escape route. For the next three days the unit suffered heavy casualties from intense shelling, also inflicting heavy casualties on the retreating Germans trying to cross the river. The War Diary entry for 29 August noted, "Thousands of Germans drowned or were killed from our 4.2" mortars and arty fire plus our MMGs." By 30 August, the fight was over. The German remnants had retreated from the Seine and Rouen area. The next day the battalion moved across the River Seine into Rouen to be greeted once again as liberators.

September 1944 found the unit in the west suburbs of Rouen. From there they moved to occupy barracks formerly used by German Engineers south of Dieppe. For the next four days the unit participated in parades and commemorative ceremonies to mark the 2nd Division's previous visit to Dieppe in August 1942. Aside from the ceremonial duties it was an opportunity to rest and reconsolidate. On 6 September, the battalion loaded on trucks and moved to Autingues, where they spent the night of 7 September, before moving on to Furnes. On 9 September, the unit occupied La Panne Bains, chasing out scattered pockets of German resistance. The next day the unit continued the advance through fire from heavy machine guns, mortars, anti-aircraft guns and heavy coastal guns and spent the night occupying a portion of the German West Wall defences.

The advance towards Bray-Dunes continued on 11 September, against increasingly stiff opposition from elements of the 1055th Grenadier Regiment of the German 89th Infantry Division. Before first light on 13 September, the Camerons launched a concerted attack against Bray-Dunes. "A" and "C" Companies made a right flanking attack through the sand dunes by the coast while "D" Company infiltrated through the enemy lines to size the crossroads. While "D" Company achieved their objective by 05:30 hours, "A" and "C" Companies failed to penetrate enemy opposition leaving "D" Company surrounded and cut off. At 18:00 hours the battalion launched a right flanking attack through Gyrelde to relieve "D" Company. "A" and "B" Companies were stopped after passing through Gyrelde but "C" Company on the left flank fought through fierce opposition to occupy a position 300 yd (270 m) south of "D" Company but could not complete the link up until the following evening. By early afternoon on 15 September, the battalion had secured Bray-Dunes. That evening the unit was moved to a rest area east of Bray Dunes where they kept up aggressive patrolling each night. Warrant Officer F. K. Breakey won the DCM during the battle for Bray-Dunes.

On 19 September, the battalion moved to Duffel where they were to stay until 23 September. Arriving in the vicinity of Sint-Job-in-'t-Goor, the Camerons advanced as the reserve battalion in the 6 Brigade advance to the Antwerp-Turnhout canal. On 27 September, the battalion took up new positions west of Gravemwezel, trading fire back and forth across the canal with the enemy and conducting aggressive patrolling. During one of these patrols Lieutenant E. J. Reid won the Military Cross.

On 29 September, the unit moved again to cross the Anvers-Turnhout canal under the command of 5th Brigade to relieve le Régiment de Maisonneuve in the area of Oostbrecht. On 1 October, the Camerons, again under the command of 5th Brigade, launched an attack against Sternhoven. Taking the objective, the battalion was immediately ordered to carry on to their subsequent objective, a crossroads. Before they could get out of Sternhoven the Camerons were hit by a concerted counter-attack and spent the night in desperate close combat amongst the burning buildings of the town. Successfully beating off the counter-attack, the unit handed Sternhoven over to Les Fusiliers Mont-Royal and began preparations to continue the advance towards Camp de Brasschaet. Before the Cameron attack could get underway, the Germans launched another counter-attack on Sternhoven and the unit went to the aid of Les Fusiliers Mont-Royal, quashing the final enemy attempt to regain the town. Probing towards Camp de Brasschaet on the morning of 2 October, "B" Company, with tanks from The Fort Garry Horse in support, met heavy resistance and was forced to retire to their former positions. On 3 October the battalion launched an attack on Camp de Brasschaet and secured the objective taking 82 prisoners of war from the 1018th Grenadier Regiment and 14th Reserve Machine Gun Battalion. On 5 October, "C" Company, tasked to clear the road to Sternhoven, was forced to retire after taking heavy casualties. "A" Company was moved forward in their place to consolidate in the Lake area.

The battalion remained at Camp de Brasschaet for the next few days, resting and reorganizing for their next operation. An active patrolling program netted 92 prisoners of war. On 9 October, the battalion moved to an area northeast of Putte to relieve the Essex Scottish with battalion headquarters setting up at Villa Anna. On 10 October, the battalion secured the flank of the successful 2nd Division attack to cut off the German garrison south of the Scheldt and the islands north of the river. Resuming vigorous patrolling, three prisoners from the 847th Grenadier Regiment were taken on 11 October. During this period a company of 150 men of the Belgian White Brigade came under command of the Camerons. On the night of 14–15 October, three German paratroopers were captured by another patrol. On the evening of 20 October, the battalion moved to relieve The Royal Regiment of Canada and then again the next day to relieve The Royal Hamilton Light Infantry at Woensdrecht.

Patrols overnight on 22–23 in preparation for an attack on 23 August brought in seven prisoners of war. Launched at 07:00 hours, the attack on Woensdrecht met stiff resistance and by 16:30 hours "A" Company, which had gone to the assistance of the South Saskatchewan Regiment, was forced back to its former positions. Despite the fierce opposition, the battalion captured 40 paratroopers from the 2nd and 3rd Battalions of the 6th Fallschirmjäger Regiment. Continuing the attack on 24 October, the Camerons made good progress against only light opposition, the majority of the enemy having withdrawn after the sharp fighting the previous day. By 23:00 hours the area was cleared of enemy, and the battalion was relieved by the Black Watch of Canada. Private C. R. J. Batty was awarded a Military Medal for his actions. Sergeant Wilford Hiram Kirk received the Military Order of William (Knight 4th Class), Canadian Volunteer Service Medal and a number of British medals for his actions.

On 26 October, the unit moved into the Beveland Causeway. On 27 October the Camerons seized the town of Yerseke and launched an assault across the Zuid-Beveland canal. Landing two companies on the island forming the lock gates on the west side, the attack was repulsed by mortar and heavy machine gun fire and the companies forced back across the canal. Another attempt to secure the lock bridges the next day succeeded in reaching the objective but was forced back across the canal once again. Lieutenant-Colonel Tommy Thompson was awarded a Distinguished Service Order for his actions.

On 29 October, the battalion crossed the canal to relieve two companies of the Essex Scottish at Wemeldinge. That night Corporal M. J. Robertson from "A" Company brought in 21 prisoners of war (19 from 1020th Grenadier Regiment of the 70th Infantry Division and two from 170th Feld Ersatz) he and two others had taken at Kattendijke while on a wandering patrol of their own. On 30 October, the battalion moved to Goes to relieve the Black Watch of Canada where they remained the next day.

On 1 November, the battalion moved to Willebroek for rest and refit. On 9 November, the Camerons were on the move again, this time to the town of Mook en Middelaar to relieve the 5th Battalion, Duke of Cornwall's Light Infantry of the British 43rd (Wessex) Infantry Division. The remainder of the month was spent opposite the Meuse River in the vicinity of Mook, dug into the flooded, soggy ground. While trading mortar fire back and forth with the enemy "A" Company had a couple of interesting incidents. Private R. L. Shaw had a mortar bomb glance off his shoulder and land directly in his trench without detonating. Later an "A" Company observation post was asked to observe the fall of shot from friendly mortars when they received notice to keep their heads down as a mortar bomb was coming over minus its tail fin, and would likely drop short. When asked to provide a correction for the next round, the OP replied, "Cut all the tail fins off!". The defective bomb had landed on a close by German machine gun nest, which had been giving the company great difficulty. Patrolling by both sides, intermittent shelling, and occasional mine strikes, inflicted light casualties on the battalion and ensured soldiers kept their edge in the miserable conditions.

December would prove to be a relatively quiet month for the battalion. On 1 December, the Camerons handed over their sodden positions at Mook to the Royal Regiment of Canada and moved to Cuijk to relieve the Royal Hamilton Light Infantry. The battalion stayed in the Cuijk area resting, refitting and training until 8 December, when then moved to Bisselt to relieve the Black Watch of Canada. The unit remained at Bisselt for a week, conducting an aggressive patrolling program. On 15 December, the battalion handed over to the South Saskatchewan Regiment and moved into Groesbeek. The battalion front remained fairly quiet with sporadic machine gun and mortar fire interrupting the calm. On the night of 19–20 December, the battalion provided fire support for a South Saskatchewan Regiment attack. During this action Lance Corporal M. L. Nedohin won the Military Medal.

On 23 December, the unit was relieved in place by the Essex Scottish and moved with battalion headquarters, "B" and "C" Companies setting up in the area of Mook, Support Company in the area of Katwijk across the Meuse River and "A" and "D" Companies at Oss. The battalion shot down an enemy aircraft the night of 26 December, capturing four of the aircrew south of Nijmegen. On 27 December "A" and "D" Companies were relieved at Oss by the North Nova Scotia Highlanders. "A" Company relocated to Mook and "D" Company joined Support Company at Katwijk. The battalion would spend the rest of the month in location resting, training and marking the holiday season.

On 8 January 1945, the battalion received orders to relieve le Régiment de Maisonneuve the next day. Subsequent orders on 9 January delayed the move to 10 January. In the line again, the Camerons came under sporadic mortar, small arms and sniper fire and once again initiated an aggressive patrolling program. Overnight on 17–18 January, "C" Company conducted a platoon size raid on a number of enemy held houses. On the afternoon of 18 January, the battalion was relieved by Les Fusiliers Mont-Royal and moved back into the town of Mook proper. The Camerons were back in the line on 25 January, having relieved the South Saskatchewan Regiment. On 31 January the unit shifted to take over from Les Fusiliers Mont-Royal while the South Saskatchewans moved out of reserve to occupy the positions the Camerons were vacating.

Visited by the Brigade Commander, Brigadier General Ralph Holley Keefler on 3 February, the unit was tasked with capturing a prisoner at any cost. A raid by "A" Company on the night of 5 February, failed to secure the required prisoner but a fighting patrol from "C" Company succeeded two nights later. Due largely to Company Sergeant-Major Elvin Miller's heroic efforts, for which he was recommended for the Distinguished Conduct Medal, later downgraded to a Military Medal by a higher level headquarters, the Camerons were able to bring back a prisoner, and obtain the information that was crucial to the planning of the upcoming Operation Veritable.

On 8 February, Operation Veritable was launched with a 1,000 gun barrage. Due to the large number of casualties it had suffered since the start of the campaign, 2nd Canadian Infantry Division would sit this one out. Over the next few days, dozens of German soldiers surrendered themselves to the battalion. 13 prisoners were taken from the 1222nd Grenadier Regiment on 9 February, and another 18 the next day. By 11 February, the battalion front was quiet, the enemy having either withdrawn or been captured. On 14 February, after three months in and around Mook, the unit was transported to Nijmegen where they went into billets for a few days of rest and refit.

On 17 February the battalion moved across the border into Nazi Germany, taking up positions in Bedburg. On 18 February, the commanding officer and intelligence officer conducted a reconnaissance of the ground southeast of Kalkar approaching the Hochwald in preparation for the upcoming offensive. The next night the battalion was placed under command of the 4th Canadian Infantry Brigade and tasked to send "B" Company to relieve "D" Company of the Royal Regiment of Canada. That night the Anti-Tank Platoon took one prisoner from the 1st Battalion, 60th Panzergrenadier Division. In the early hours of 20 February, the unit was ordered to send another company to the Royal Regiment of Canada. After taking up new position in the Royals area, "A" Company was placed under command of the Royal Hamilton Light Infantry and dispatched to reinforce them against enemy counter-attack by the Panzer-Lehr-Division. By sunrise the remainder of the unit had been ordered to take over from the Royal Regiment of Canada and movement began to relieve the Royals so they could in turn relieve the Essex Scottish. By late afternoon the battalion was relieved by the Highland Light Infantry of Canada and had reverted to 6th Brigade command. The battalion spent 21 February preparing for the next day's offensive only to have the attack postponed that night. Preparations continued on 22 February, with the operation still postponed. Finally in the early morning of 26 February, Operation Blockbuster was launched.

Riding in Kangaroo armoured personnel carriers, the initial advance was held up by mines and mud forced the battalion to re-route their attack through Les Fusiliers Mont-Royal's objective. "A" Company rode onto the objective in their Kangaroos, and secured it after overcoming stiff resistance from the 156th Panzergrenadier Regiment. "B" Company reached their objective in the vicinity of "Luisendorf" (See p. 159 Whatever Men Dare, but probably Neulouisendorf, NL) with only 34 effectives, many of their Kangaroos having bogged down or gotten lost on the way. With two tanks in intimate support the greatly reduced "B" Company took the objective, capturing 26 prisoners on the way to the town and another 90 in Neulouisendorf itself. "C" Company landed on their objective without opposition after spending considerable time trying to find it. Within an hour of securing the objective "C" Company was forced to fight off the first of numerous counter-attacks, as a pair of enemy tanks engaged their positions. It was only "D" Company that was to reach their objective with little trouble. After hard fighting the unit had secured its objectives and taken 136 prisoners but at great loss – the dynamic and popular commanding officer, Lieutenant Colonel E. P. "Tommy" Thompson was dead, killed by a sniper on the objective.

It was during this action that the regiment received its second Victoria Cross nominee. Major David Rodgers, Officer Commanding "A" Company, was recommended to receive the VC for his actions on 26 February 1945. The citation was approved at every level until it reached 21st Army Group where Field Marshal Bernard Montgomery downgraded the award to an immediate Distinguished Service Order.

The Germans continued counter-attacking on 27 February, but most of the enemy attacks were broken up with well-directed mortar and artillery fire. That night the battalion was relieved by the 5th Battalion, Duke of Cornwall's Light Infantry and moved to Kirsel. 28 February, was spent reorganizing and preparing for the next offensive.

1 March, found the unit at Udermerbruck preparing to resume the attack. The next day the battalion advanced through the Hochwald Gap. The tanks in support could not stay with the unit, unable to crest the ridge at the edge of the gap due to intense enemy 88 mm fire. Approaching the objective the unit held up short, finding friendly forces already occupying the Battalion's assigned objective. Following a 39-minute artillery barrage, the Camerons resumed the attack on 3 March meeting stiff resistance. Under intense mortar, machine gun and artillery fire the unit made slow progress. "C" Company was stopped and forced to pull back while "A" and "B" Companies managed to fight forward to the new objective on the southeastern edge of the forest, "B" Company taking 18 prisoners from the 24th Fallschirmjäger Regiment of the 8th Fallschirmjäger Division in the process. A German counter-attack from the north fell on "B" Company but was successfully repulsed with around two-dozen casualties inflicted on the enemy. During the fighting in the Hochwald two Cameron Corporals won the Military Medal for their heroism, Corporal John Bukurak of "A" Company and Corporal Daniel Connors of "B" Company.

The next day the Camerons turned north to clear the east edge of the Hochwald Forest. The unit found the enemy had withdrawn but had left the area heavily mined which made the woods clearance a slow and dangerous undertaking.

On 5 March the unit moved to Exhmachdurm where Lieutenant-Colonel A. A. Kennedy assumed command from Major R. H. Lane who had been acting CO since Tommy Thompson had been killed at Kalkar Ridge. The next day the battalion continued the advance through the Hochwald. Preceded by an artillery barrage, "A" and "B" Companies led the advance. "A" Company was stopped 200 yd (180 m) short of their objective, coming under an intense crossfire from German machine guns. "B" Company was similarly held up after advancing 500 yd (460 m). Despite the use of tanks and artillery support, the unit could not dislodge the enemy resistance and withdrew under orders from 6th Brigade. A second attack was required utilizing all of 5th Brigade augmented by the South Saskatchewan Regiment to overcome the resistance. The next two days the Camerons spent resting and refitting in preparation for resuming the advance.

On 9 March, the unit moved into Xanten to relieve the Calgary Highlanders. The completion of the relief was delayed due to enemy action along the Calgary Highlander's front. "A" and "C" Companies effected their relief that night but "B" and "D" Companies were not able to take over the Calgary Highlander positions until the next mornin

g. Patrols from Scout Platoon netted 28 prisoners overnight mostly from the 6th Fallschirmjäger Battalion. On the afternoon of 10 March the unit moved again, this time to relieve le Régiment de Maisonneuve at Birten. 11 March, was spent resting and reorganizing and the next day the unit was pulled out of the line to a Division rest area at Rindern. The next five days were spent training and performing much needed maintenance on the unit's vehicles and equipment.

On 18 March, the unit executed Operation Loot aimed at clearing an enemy salient in the Rindern area. All companies crossed their start lines at 07:00 hours and finding the area almost completely vacated, completed clearing their respective objectives by noon. "C" and "D" Companies were tasked with clearing the remainder of the salient and final success was reported at 18:00 hours. Nine evacuees were gathered up in the operation and sent back for screening. 19 March, found the unit moving into the Reichswald Forest where it would spend the next eight days refitting and training for crossing the Rhine.

On 28 March, with the Camerons in the lead, the 6th Canadian Infantry Brigade moved to "Blackfriars Bridge" and crossed the Rhine to begin the drive to the North Sea. The battalion set up east of Praest, in the vicinity of Schriek, overnight and began establishing its presence through aggressive patrolling. "A" Company patrols brought in 8 prisoners and "B" Company patrols netted 64 prisoners overnight. That night "D" Company was tasked to probe forward to the town of Netterden. Finding the town held by a company of German paratroopers, Major D. D. Sweeting, Officer Commanding "D" Company, decided to launch a dawn attack to clear the town. Upon receiving Sweeting's update, the CO tasked "C" Company under Captain F. R. Sutton to move around to the northeast of the town to cut off the enemy when "D" Company attacked.

"D" Company's attack went in as planned at 04:00 hours on 30 March. Finding their line of retreat cut off the German paratroopers decided to stand and fight. After seven hours of bitter street fighting a truce was called to evacuate the wounded on both sides. Making use of the truce, Sweeting issued the German commander an ultimatum, surrender within the next half an hour or be totally destroyed. Realizing his position hopeless, the German commander surrendered. Of the original company from the 17th Fallschirmjäger Regiment of the 6th Fallschirmjäger Division garrisoning Netterden, only 2 officers and 22 soldiers survived to go into captivity as prisoners of war. During their two days in the area the battalion captured a total of 2 enemy officers and 128 other ranks at a cost of 4 Camerons killed and 10 wounded. For his successful company attack on Netterden Major Sweeting received the Distinguished Service Order.

Consolidating in Netterden, the unit continued the attack towards Veldhunten on 31 March. Supported by an intense artillery barrage "A" Company under Captain J. Free captured their objective without incurring a single casualty, taking 30 prisoners in the process. "B" and "D" Companies were less fortunate. Having pushed past "A" Company for phase 2 of the attack, both "B" and "D" Companies were met by withering machine gun fire 600 yd (550 m) past their start lines. The condition of the ground made it impossible to employ tanks, so the Carrier Platoon was tasked to assist "D" Company. Engaged by a German self-propelled gun while attempting to move up, Carrier Platoon was unable to reach the forward companies. With no way forward, both companies were withdrawn, "D" Company with considerable difficulty, to reorganize for a renewed attack the next day. For his actions during the battle Corporal Abbot Fraser was awarded the Bronze Lion, a Dutch decoration.

While this was happening "C" Company was fulfilling a task of its own, securing a road junction to provide a maintenance route for 6th Canadian Infantry Brigade. Encountering stiff enemy resistance, "C" Company managed to secure their objective by executing a hasty flanking attack. For his actions during the attack, Sergeant Robert Pearcey was awarded the Military Medal.

The battalion renewed their attack on 1 April, to find that the bulk of the enemy had withdrawn leaving only scattered pockets of resistance to be overcome. By noon all companies had consolidated on their objectives. The unit spent the night in Ziek and moved to Keienburg the next day to relieve the Royal Hamilton Light Infantry. On 3 April, "C" Company and the Carrier Platoon captured Steenderen without opposition, taking three prisoners of war from the 951st Grenadier Regiment of the 361st Volksgrenadier Division southwest of the town. That night the battalion moved to relieve the Royal Hamilton Light Infantry at Almen. The 4 April was a relatively quiet day. A lone German self-propelled gun that was being a nuisance was located and knocked out and patrols probed forward to determine the location of the enemy's forward defensive line. The majority of the unit spent the day resting and preparing to continue the advance. The next night the battalion moved across the canal and on 6 April, Oolden was seized without opposition with a number of prisoners from the 1409th Fortress Battalion taken.

Moving to a concentration in the vicinity of Bathmensche Veen, "A" and "B" Companies forced a quick crossing of the Schipbeek canal with "C" Company following close behind. Surprise was achieved and no opposition was experienced until the companies were consolidating on the far side when the Germans started to shell the company positions and the crossing points heavily. Two Company Commanders were put out of action by the enemy mortar fire. Major H. P. Falloon, Officer Commanding "B" Company was seriously wounded and Major W. S. Watt, Officer Commanding "C" Company was knocked unconscious. That night "D" Company crossed the canal and moved past "A" Company to clear the woods while the remainder of the battalion, still under intermittent shellfire, extended and consolidated their positions in the vicinity of De Lurkens. On 7 April, "B" Company cleared the woods east of its positions taking thirty-six prisoners. The next day "A" and "C" Companies successfully extended the left flank of the battalion against slight opposition from the Germans.

On 9 April, the battalion moved to a concentration area to be picked up by troop-carrying vehicles for a move to Spoorweg Bosch to relieve the Essex Scottish on 10 April. That night the Camerons were on the move again moving to Gramsbergen. On 11 April the unit continued on to Balkbrug and then swung north through Kirkenbosch to Hoogeveen finally stopping at Terhost for the night. The next day "D" Company and two sections from Carrier Platoon made a bridgehead across the canal, and the battalion continued north to take up positions around Hijken. 13 April was spent at Hijken resting and maintaining equipment with "C" Company and Carrier Platoon patrolling to the north and west to mop up enemy stragglers.

On 14 April, the battalion launched an attack on Haren. "A" and "B" Companies were tasked with clearing the northern half of the town and "C" and "D" Companies the southern half. Scout Platoon under Lieutenant R. A. King cleared out the factory in the town, capturing 60 enemy prisoners. By 23:00 hours all companies reported their areas completely cleared. "A" and "B" Companies consolidated in Haren while "C" and "D" Companies passed through them to establish positions on the outskirts of Groningen.

The next day battalion headquarters moved up to Groningen followed by "A" Company, which took over a position from the Essex Scottish dominating the bridge over the Ems Canal. The remainder of the day was spent mopping up enemy stragglers throughout the Battalion's area. The Camerons captured a total of one hundred and forty German prisoners on 15 April. The following day the unit passed through Les Fusiliers Mont-Royal to clear the northeast sector of the town up to the Van Starkenborgh Canal. "B" Company arrived at the canal to find the bridge over it held by the Germans who had raised the centre span making it impassable. Aided by two Dutch civilians Lieutenant W. C. McNeill crossed a narrow catwalk, which was being swept with automatic weapons fire, to the bridge mechanism and lowered the bridge. "B" Company quickly attacked across the bridge and the German resistance collapsed. Establishing a bridgehead on the east bank of the canal, "B" Company rounded up twenty-six prisoners in the process. McNeill and one of the Dutch civilians were wounded in lowering the bridge but their heroic actions had enabled the company's success.

That evening the battalion was ordered to occupy the town of Ten Boer. Through a series of company infiltrations the unit occupied the objective overnight and by 07:20 hours of 17 April, all elements were firmly ensconced in the town. The remainder of 17 and 18 April, were spent resting, reorganizing and preparing to resume the advance. On the night of 18 April "C" Company set up outposts at Ten Post and along the road to Stedum. On 19 April the commanding officer, Lieutenant-Colonel A. A. Kennedy, showing signs of combat fatigue accumulated from his exemplary service in the Italian Campaign, was relieved of command and granted 48 hours leave of absence. Ultimately he would never return to the Camerons. Major R. H. Lane took over the battalion as temporary commanding officer. That afternoon "A" Company, supported by a section of flamethrowers, was sent to probe enemy positions in the towns of Stedum, Loppersum and Wirten. Encountering the enemy on the outskirts of Loppersum, "A" Company broke contact after a brief engagement returning with the information that between 100 and 200 Germans were holding Loppersum. A planned move the next day was postponed and on 21 April, the unit moved back into Germany to occupy billets in Wilderhausen.

The battalion resumed the advance on 22 April, as the depth battalion of the brigade. Taking over the lead from Les Fusiliers Mont-Royal that evening, the unit encountered stiffening resistance as they closed on Kirchhatten. "A" Company overcame a roadblock with the assistance of Wasp flamethrower carriers and the request was sent back to bring up tank support to assist gaining lodgement in the town. On 23 April "B" Company started off the attack on Kirchhatten, clearing the woods on the left of the axis of advance south of the town and taking 24 prisoners. Company Sergeant-Major Earl Ovens, who had already been Mentioned in Dispatches for his actions at Dieppe as a private, was awarded the Military Medal for his part in "B" Company's attack.

"C" Company then passed through "B" to carry the attack into Kirchhatten. The Battalion Tactical Headquarters, "C" and "D" Companies were counter-attacked with one of the "D" Company Platoon being forced back by the onslaught. The Unit launched an immediate counter-counterattack supported by artillery and tanks, regaining their positions and driving the enemy back into the woods.

After a relatively quiet night with patrols sent out to pinpoint the enemy, the attack resumed the next day. "D" Company led off with "B" Company following. Running into resistance, "D" Company requested "A" Company move up on the left to provide support. Bolstered by a section of Wasps, a troop of tanks and a section of assault pioneers, "A" Company moved to assist. That night the enemy launched a small counterattack against "B" Company. Easily repulsed, the Germans launched a second, much larger attack, which "B" Company only managed to fight off by calling artillery down on their own positions. The unit conducted a busy patrol program overnight. On the morning of 25 April "D" Company succeeded in securing their objectives, and "A" Company was ordered to send a contact patrol to link up with "D". Kirchhatten was finally secured and Lieutenant-Colonel R. L. Rutherford, returned to the regiment from his position as brigade major of 6th Brigade to take command of the battalion.

On 26 April, the unit was still under intermittent shellfire particularly in the "A" and "D" Company areas, and spent the day reorganizing and preparing for the next phase of 6 Brigade's advance. Five prisoners of war from the 358th Marine Battalion were taken by "B" Company. A patrol that night returned with one prisoner who provided information that two companies from the Panzer-Lehr-Division with a combined strength of about 100 was opposing the battalion. Throughout 27 April, the unit continued to exchange mortar and artillery fire with the enemy and "A" Company fought a brief skirmish with a small party of Germans, taking one prisoner. That evening all companies reported increased enemy vehicle traffic along the front. The artillery duel continued on 28 April, but other enemy activity dropped off significantly. With the exception of the detonation of several road cratering charges, no other enemy activity was observed. 29 April, was even quieter and "B" Company pushed forward along the road to the northwest of the town to establish new positions at the road junction.

The advance resumed the morning of 30 April, with "C" Company moving through "B" Company's positions to lead off. "D" and "B" Company advanced along their axis with "A" following behind "B" as the battalion reserve. All companies made good progress, and a dozen prisoners were gathered up as the Camerons moved forward. The advance continued unopposed until early evening when "C" Company ran into a well defended road block and crater. The battalion deployed to cover the main crossroads and dug in for the night. Patrols were sent out that night to recce the road block and potential routes.

On the morning of 1 May, the advance resumed. The road block was destroyed with an anti-tank gun and "A" Company passed through "C" Company with "B" and "D" Companies continuing the advance along their own axis. "A" Company encountered resistance from a small group of determined defenders but overcame the enemy with tank and artillery support, taking 11 prisoners from the 1st Battalion of the 22nd Grenadier Regiment of the 490th Infantry Division and the 16th Reinforcement Battalion. By early afternoon the companies were consolidating their positions in the vicinity of Hatter Wuss. A probe by Scout Platoon was strongly repulsed and "B" Company, occupying the houses vacated by the scouts beat off two small counter-attacks, dispersing the enemy with mortar and artillery fire. The day's advance netted the battalion a total of twenty nine enemy prisoners.

Patrols forward of the battalion position the morning of 2 May met no enemy, and the commanding officer continued the push forward. Consolidating in Twee Ibake, the battalion received orders to move to a concentration area at Bummerstede in preparation for moving to enlarge a bridgehead the South Saskatchewan Regiment had established over the Küsten canal. The battalion crossed the Küsten canal on 3 May and moved through the South Saskatchewan Regiment and Les Fusiliers Mont-Royal to establish positions in Oldenburg. Later that afternoon the battalion advanced further north and established new positions for the night. The next day was spent regrouping and at 20:00 hours that night the BBC announced that all German forces in northwest Europe would surrender the next morning. A phone call from 6th Brigade Headquarters at 01:50 hours confirmed the surrender. Hostilities were over.

The victory was celebrated with church parades on 6 May, and a victory parade in Oldenburg on the 9th. Garrison duty kept the battalion in Germany and the Netherlands until the end of September, when they returned to England. Docking at Dover on 30 September, the battalion moved by train to a camp at Farnborough. The Camerons left the U.K. from Southampton on board the RMS Queen Elizabeth on 13 November. Arriving in Halifax, the unit carried on to Montreal, where they boarded the train for the final leg of their journey home to Winnipeg. The Camerons arrived home on 22 November, in the midst of a winter blizzard to be met by a welcoming party of officials, jubilant citizens and tearful relatives. Upon the demobilization of the 1st Battalion, The Queen's Own Cameron Highlanders of Canada, the Reserve Army component, the 2nd Battalion, was officially re-designated the Queen's Own Cameron Highlanders of Canada effective 1 April 1946.

=== Post war ===
The seeds of the Cold War had been sown well before the close of the Second World War. Militant communism threatened the fleeting peace that was achieved through the defeat of the Axis powers. Operating under the belief that the next war would be nuclear and would likely be finished before a large-scale mobilization of reserves could be affected, the decision was reached that the Regular Army would need to be more robust and would become Canada's main line of defence rather than the Militia. By 1946 the Militia was restored to basically its pre-1939 condition.

In 1950 the Red River climbed to its highest level since 1861, resulting in major flooding in Winnipeg from April to June. Heavy autumn rains and a long winter with heavy snowfall followed by a cold spring, which prevented normal thawing, all contributed to the catastrophe. More rainfall in early May exacerbated flooding. In total 600 sq mi (1,600 km^{2}) of Manitoba between the US border and Winnipeg became a vast inland sea. The flood climaxed on the night of 5 May, known as "Black Friday", when driving rain, sleet and snow swelled the Red River to the point where it tore apart eight dikes and destroyed four of Winnipeg's eleven bridges. Throughout much of the city homes and buildings were engulfed by the floodwaters. The regiment was mobilized in aid of the Civil Power on 8 May. Organized into five work parties, the Camerons were piped to the dykes and worked around the clock in shifts for 17 days until the danger of flood diminished. When the flood was over, 107,000 people had been evacuated from the area. The cost of the flood was estimated at over one billion dollars.

In June 1950 the Cold War turned hot with Communist North Korea's invasion of South Korea. Although the Canadian Government chose not to mobilize the Militia to fight overseas, numerous Second World War veterans and serving reservists, including many Camerons, chose to volunteer for the new battalions that were being raised to go to Korea.

In 1960, the regiment celebrated its 50th Birthday. Part of the celebrations, the performing of a retreat ceremony on the Manitoba Legislative grounds, was broadcast on national television. The decade would provide little else to celebrate. The 1960s saw a serious erosion of Militia capabilities and morale. Undermanned and issued with aging or obsolete equipment, the reserves were not seen as playing any useful role in a major overseas conflict, particularly with the strategic assessment of the day seeing any future war quickly becoming nuclear and being of short duration. Lacking a war-fighting role, the focus of the Militia concentrated more on domestic operations, particularly territorial defence and survival operations after a nuclear conflict.

During the 1970s the role of the Army Reserve shifted again. Unification of the Forces and years of budgetary reductions had resulted in Forces wide personnel shortages. The focus for the Reserves shifted to providing individual soldiers to augment Regular Force units overseas. Camerons increasingly began to deploy as augmentees to Regular Force units on United Nations Peacekeeping duties in places such as Egypt, the Golan Heights and Cyprus and to participate on flyovers to Germany to serve with Canadian units operating with NATO in North-West Europe.

In the spring of 1979, the Red River jumped its banks again, rising to the flood levels of 1950. While Winnipeg was protected by the massive floodway built after the 1950 flood, the farming communities to the south were largely unprotected. Within an hour of the call for assistance, the Camerons had assembled and dispatched troops to augment 2 Princess Patricia's Canadian Light Infantry (PPCLI) operating inside the ring dyke around Morris, Manitoba.

In the 1980s the role of the Militia was once more re-defined. The 1987 Defence White paper espoused the belief that any conflict would only turn nuclear after a series of conventional battles, which would give the belligerents adequate time to mobilize and commit their reserves to battle. This thinking eventually gave rise to the Total Force concept in which the Reserve and Regular components were to be more fully integrated. The 1980s ended with the regiment marking its 79th birthday in 1989. Celebrations were held at Minto Armoury with the itinerary including a military skills demonstration, a performance by the Pipes and Drums, and an all-ranks Regimental Dinner.

The 1990s proved to be a very busy decade for the regiment, both operationally and ceremonially. Falling out of Total Force was an increasing role for Reserve augmentation on overseas operations. Starting with Operation Harmony Rotation 1 in 1992 (Croatia) the Camerons began to provide a steady stream of augmentees to Regular Force units deploying on Operations.

1994 and 1995 were the years for big parades. First, the regiment participated in the Freedom of the City parade marking the 50th anniversary of the D Day invasion. Next, the regiment celebrated its 85th birthday in 1995, with a parade at the Manitoba Legislature. Finally, the Camerons participated in the Freedom of the City parade marking the 50th anniversary of Victory in Europe Day (VE Day).

Fully focused on training for war once again, the late 1990s found the regiment increasingly involved in domestic operations. In 1997, the regiment was at ground zero for the "Flood of the Century". This time the scope of the flood was so enormous, not even the floodway could protect Winnipeg as it had in 1979. The Camerons provided volunteers for the 38 Canadian Brigade Group (38 CBG) Composite Company and spent the spring sandbagging and building dykes throughout Southern Manitoba. When the possibility of the Y2K bug threatened to paralyze the nation at the end of 1999, the regiment was tasked to provide Provincial Task Force Manitoba (PTFMB) Company 2 for Operation Abacus. The company headquarters was stood up several days before the end of December and was prepared to initiate a mobilization on order.

The new millennium carried on in much the same fashion as the last decade of the previous. When the Reserves were tasked with raising a formed Rifle Company to augment 1 PPCLI on Operation Palladium Rotation 11 to Bosnia in 2002, the Camerons provided the Company second-in-command, Company Administration Officer, and eight other augmentees. In August 2003, disaster struck again. With forest fires raging out of control in many areas of British Columbia, the regiment was called to provide augmentees to fight fires (Operation PEREGRINE). Once again, the Camerons responded to the call.

Today the Camerons fulfill both military and ceremonial functions at home and abroad. As an infantry regiment, the unit's main focus is provide trained infantry soldiers to meet the operational requirements of the Canadian Forces. Whether it is augmenting Regular Force units on overseas operations or fighting floods and forest fires at home, the Camerons provide a ready source of trained soldiers.

The regiment parades at Minto Armoury, 969 St. Matthews Avenue in Winnipeg on Tuesday nights from the last week of August to the second week of June. During the summer unit members attend military courses throughout Canada.

Motto: Ullamh (Scottish Gaelic for 'ready')

=== Lineage chart ===
Lineage chart

1910	The 79th Highlanders of Canada
1910	The 79th Cameron Highlanders of Canada
1914	43rd Bn, CEF
1916	174th "Overseas" Infy Bn, CEF	179th "Overseas" Infy Bn, CEF
1916	Absorbed by 17th Reserve Bn
1917	Absorbed by 14th Reserve Bn
1920	Disbanded	1st Bn (43rd Bn, CEF), The Cameron Highlanders of Canada	2nd Bn (174th Bn, CEF), (Note: Reserve) The Cameron Highlanders of Canada	3rd Bn (179th Bn, CEF), The Cameron Highlanders of Canada
1923	1st Bn (43rd Bn, CEF), The Queen's Own Cameron Highlanders of Canada	2nd Bn (174th Bn, CEF), The Queen's Own Cameron Highlanders of Canada	3rd Bn (179th Bn, CEF), The Queen's Own Cameron Highlanders of Canada
1936	The Queen's Own Cameron Highlanders of Canada	Disbanded	Disbanded
1939	The Queen's Own Cameron Highlanders of Canada, CASF
1940	1st Bn, The Queen's Own Cameron Highlanders of Canada, CASF	2nd (Reserve) Bn, The Queen's Own Cameron Highlanders of Canada
1945	Disbanded	The Queen's Own Cameron Highlanders of Canada
1954	The Queen's Own Cameron Highlanders of Canada (Motor)
1958	The Queen's Own Cameron Highlanders of Canada

=== Authorized marches ===
- Regimental March Past: "The Piobaireachd of Donald Dhu"
- Regimental March: "The March of the Cameron Men"
- A Company March: "Blue Bonnets over the Border"
- B Company March: "A Hundred Pipers"
- C Company March: "Glendaurel Highlanders"
- D Company March: "Bonnie Dundee"
- HQ & Support Company March: "The Muckin' o' Geordie's Byre"
- Administration Company March: "Queen Elizabeth"

== Alliances ==
- United Kingdom - The Highlanders, 4th Battalion The Royal Regiment of Scotland

== Battle honours ==
In the list below, battle honours in small capitals were awarded for participation in large operations and campaigns, while those in lowercase indicate honours granted for more specific battles. Battle honours in bold type are emblazoned on the regimental colour.

The regimental colour of The Queen's Own Cameron Highlanders of Canada.

First World War

- **Ypres, 1915, '17**
- Festubert, 1915
- **Mount Sorrel**
- **Somme, 1916**
- Flers–Courcelette
- **Ancre Heights**
- **Arras, 1917, '18**
- **Vimy, 1917**
- Hill 70
- **Passchendaele**
- **Amiens**
- Scarpe, 1918
- Drocourt–Quéant
- Hindenburg Line
- **Canal du Nord**
- Cambrai, 1918
- Pursuit to Mons
- **France and Flanders, 1915–18**

Second World War

- **Dieppe**
- Bourguébus Ridge
- **St. André-sur-Orne**
- **Verrières Ridge – Tilly-la-Campagne**
- **Falaise**
- Falaise Road
- The Laison
- **Forêt de la Londe**
- **Dunkirk, 1944**
- The Scheldt
- **Woensdrecht**
- South Beveland
- **The Rhineland**
- **The Hochwald**
- **Xanten**
- The Rhine
- Groningen
- Oldenburg
- North-West Europe, 1942, 1944–1945

South-West Asia

- Afghanistan

== See also ==
- Canadian-Scottish regiment
- The Canadian Crown and the Canadian Forces
- The Queen's Own Cameron Highlanders of Canada Museum

== Order of precedence ==
Preceded by The Loyal Edmonton Regiment (4th Battalion, Princess Patricia's Canadian Light Infantry)	The Queen's Own Cameron Highlanders of Canada	Succeeded by Royal Westminster Regiment
