= 174th Battalion (Cameron Highlanders of Canada), CEF =

The 174th (Cameron Highlanders of Canada) Battalion, CEF, was a unit in the Canadian Expeditionary Force (CEF) during the First World War. One of a number of Highlander battalions in the CEF, it was based in Winnipeg, Manitoba, and began recruiting during the winter of 1915/16 in Manitoba, northern Saskatchewan, and Alberta. The unit left Halifax bound for England aboard HMT Olympic on 29 April 1917. Upon arrival on 7 May 1917, they proceeded to Upper Dibgate Camp and were absorbed into the 14th Reserve Battalion, which later joined the 11th Reserve Battalion. In this capacity they reinforced the 16th and 43rd Battalions in France and absorbed casualties from these units. The 174th (Cameron Highlanders of Canada) Battalion, CEF, was briefly commanded by Lieutenant-Colonel James A. Cantlie from the end of May to August 20, 1916, at which time Lieutenant-Colonel H. F. Osler assumed command.
