= Lasson, Calvados =

Lasson
- Part of Rots
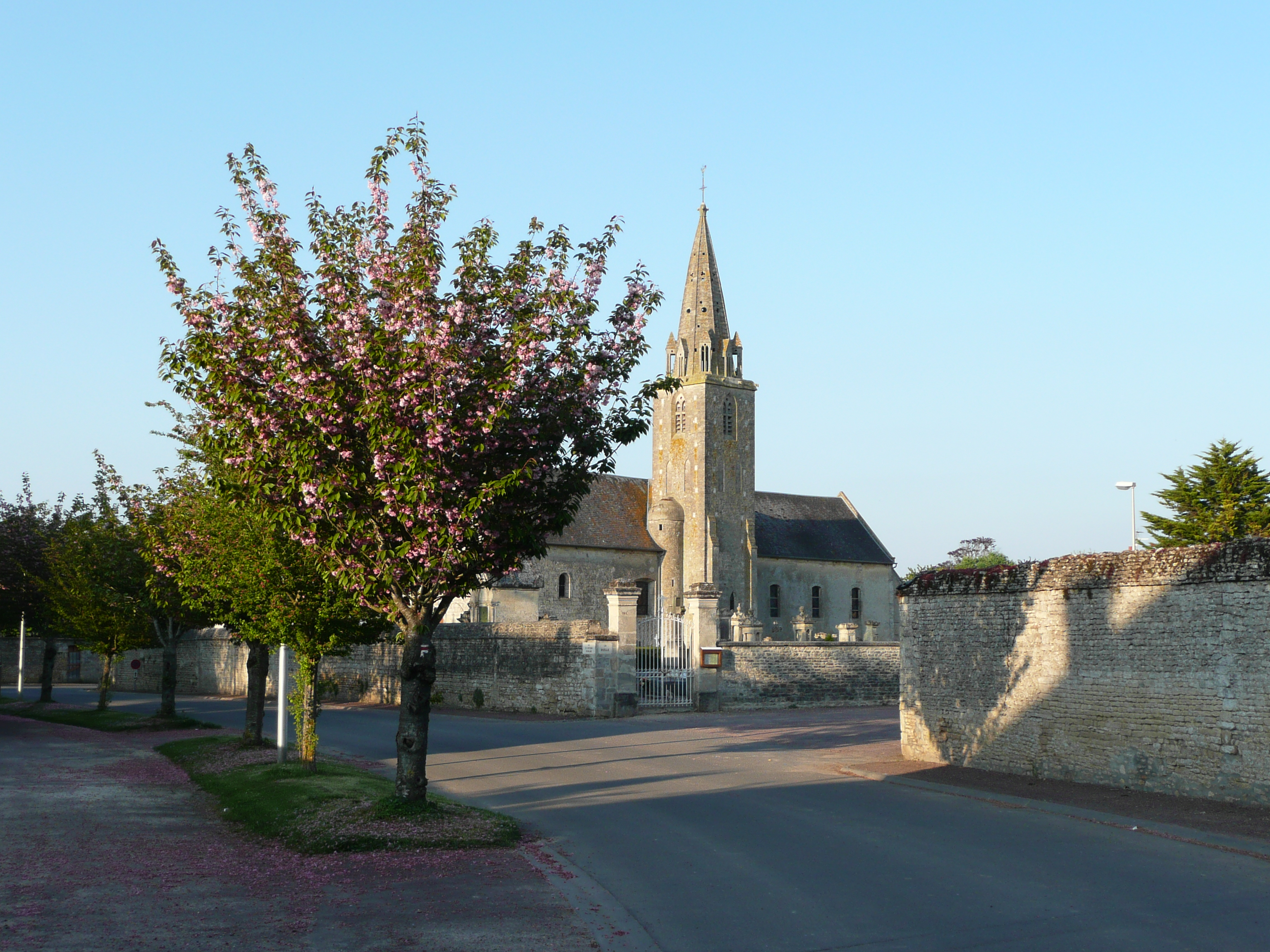
- Saint-Pierre
- Location of Lasson
- Location within France Location within Normandy
- Coordinates: 49°14′04″N 0°27′45″W
- Country: France
- Region: Normandy
- Department: Calvados
- Arrondissement: Caen
- Canton: Thue et Mue
- Commune: Rots
- Area^{1}: 4.02 km^{2} (1.55 sq mi)
- Elevation: 30 m (98 ft)
- Highest elevation: 59 m (194 ft)
- Lowest elevation: 34 m (112 ft)
- Population (2023): 661
  - Density: 164/km^{2} (426/sq mi)
- Time zone: UTC+01:00 (CET)
  - Summer (DST): UTC+02:00 (CEST)
- Postal code: 14740
- ^{1} French Land Register data, which excludes lakes, ponds, glaciers > 1 km^{2} (0.386 sq mi or 247 acres) and river estuaries.

Lasson (French pronunciation: [lasɔ̃]) is a former commune in the Calvados department in the Normandy region in northwestern France. On 1 January 2016, it was merged into the commune of Rots.

== See also ==
- Communes of the Calvados department
