= Wilford Hiram Kirk =

Canadian military officer (1918–2009)

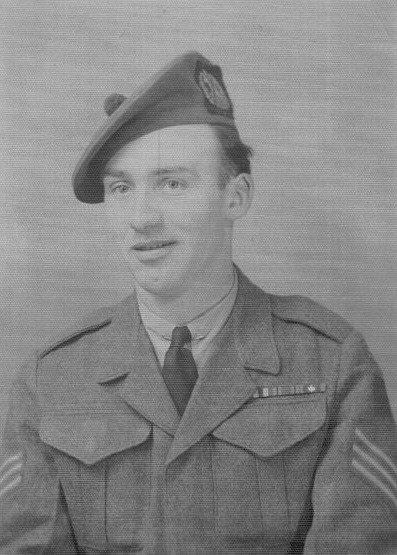
- Kirk in 1942
- Born: February 18, 1918 near Marchwell, Saskatchewan, Canada
- Died: July 30, 2009 (aged 91)
- Military career
- Allegiance: Canada
- Service years: 1942–1946
- Rank: Sergeant
- Unit: Queen's Own Cameron Highlanders of Canada
- Conflicts: Operation Overlord; Battle of the Scheldt
- Awards: Military Order of William (Knight 4th Class) Canadian Volunteer Service Medal; Defence Medal; 1939–1945 Star; France and Germany Star War Medal 1939–1945

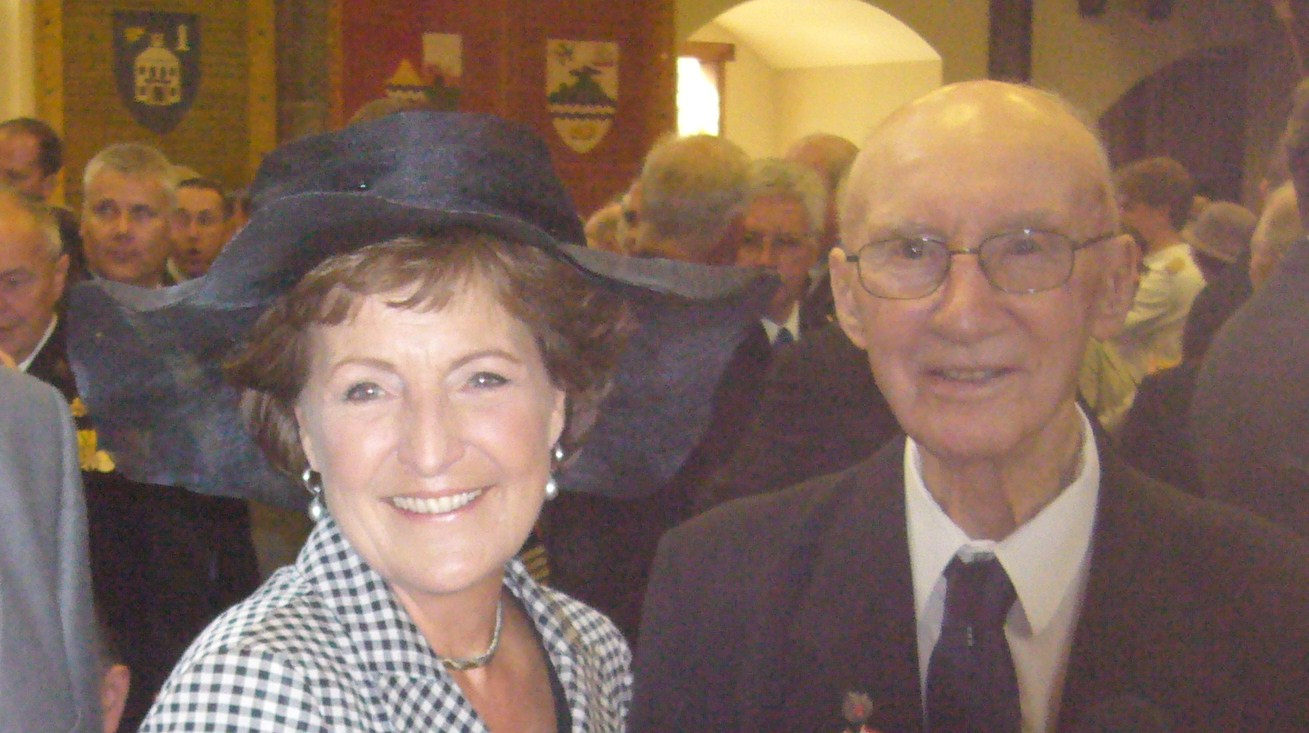
Kirk with Princess Margriet at the presentation of the Military Order of William to Marco Kroon in 2009

Wilford Hiram Kirk was a Canadian military officer who was awarded the Military Order of William, the highest Dutch military decoration, for his part in the liberation of the Netherlands during World War II.

== Biography ==
Kirk was born near Marchwell in the Canadian province of Saskatchewan. His parents were Samuel Ernest Kirk and Violet Gertrude Cochran.

He joined the Queen's Own Cameron Highlanders of Canada battalion on July 9, 1942, with the rank of sergeant. In September of that year, he departed for England to be trained.

On July 7, 1944, one month after D-Day, the battalion was shipped to France and helped the Allies break out of their bridgehead around Caen. Kirk fought with the battalion in France, the Netherlands, Belgium, and Germany.

=== Battle of the Scheldt ===
During the Battle of the Scheldt, Kirk led a unit of twelve Canadians in an assault on a German bunker on a hill near Woensdrecht, on the Dutch-Belgian border. Kirk managed to capture the hill but was lightly wounded by shrapnel. He drew the attention of a tank that attacked and destroyed the bunker. Kirk and his unit captured seventeen German paratroopers who emerged from the bunker to surrender. Some of the paratroopers were injured as the Germans attacked their own men for surrendering.

=== Post-war ===
In March 1945, he was sent to Ghent to train new recruits arriving from Canada. After the end of the war, he rejoined the Queen's Own Cameron Highlanders in Amersfoort and was put in charge of the unit's military police. During a patrol, he rode his motorcycle into a shell crater and broke his collarbone, requiring a six-week hospital stay.

In November 1945, he returned to Canada and left military service on January 10, 1946. A few years later, he returned to England to marry Doris E. Whisten in Barrow upon Soar, Leicestershire. They settled in Langenburg, Saskatchewan, where they owned a farm. They had three sons, one of whom died soon after birth.

Kirk returned to Woensdrecht in 1965 to visit the hill he had captured in 1944. There, he met a local family that had hidden in the cellar of the village church during the fighting. The family's daughter, Mrs. de Jong-Kuijlen, remained in contact with Kirk until his death in 2009 at the age of 91. He was buried at Ingleside Cemetery in Marchwell.

== Honours ==
Kirk received the Dutch Military Order of William (Knight 4th Class) by royal decree on December 8, 1945.

He was also awarded the Canadian Volunteer Service Medal and a series of British decorations: the War Medal 1939–1945, Defence Medal, 1939–1945 Star, and France and Germany Star.

On the first anniversary of his death, a wreath was laid on his grave by representatives of the Dutch government.
