= 179th Battalion (Cameron Highlanders of Canada), CEF =

The 179th (Cameron Highlanders of Canada) Battalion, CEF was a unit in the Canadian Expeditionary Force during the First World War. Based in Winnipeg, Manitoba, the unit began recruiting during the winter of 1915/16 in that city. After sailing to England in October 1916, the battalion was absorbed into the 17th Reserve Battalion on October 21, 1916. The battalion was disbanded on 17 July 1917. The 179th (Cameron Highlanders of Canada) Battalion, CEF had one Officer Commanding: Lieut-Col. J. Y. Reid.

The battalion is perpetuated by The Queen's Own Cameron Highlanders of Canada.
