= 43rd Battalion (Cameron Highlanders of Canada), CEF =

Canadian infantry battalion

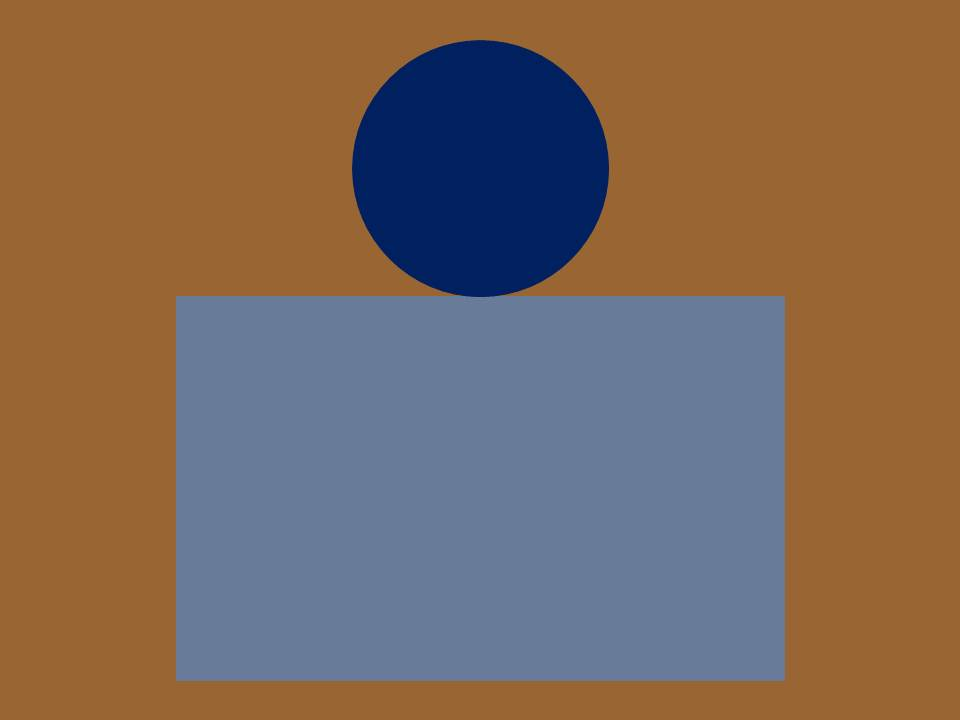
The distinguishing patch of the 43rd Battalion (Cameron Highlanders of Canada), CEF.

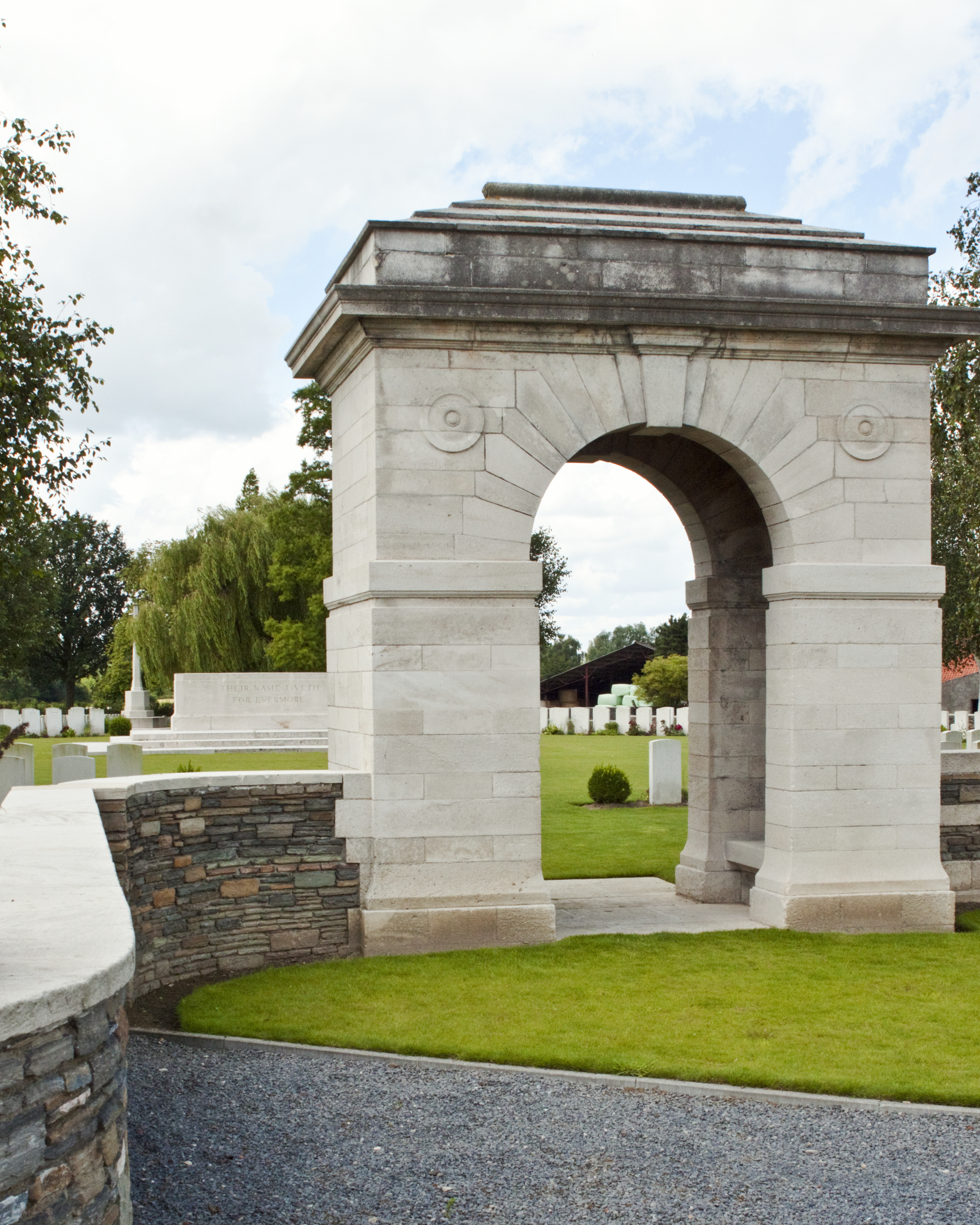
Both Reginald and Frederick Wild killed in action on 21 August 1916 are remembered with Special Memorials at the Railway Dugouts Burial Ground (Transport Farm) in Zillebeke, Belgium

The 43rd Battalion (Cameron Highlanders of Canada), CEF, was an infantry battalion of the Canadian Expeditionary Force during the Great War.

== History ==
The 43rd Battalion was authorized on 7 November 1914, gazetted 18 December, and embarked from Montreal for Britain on HMTS Grampian 1 June 1915. After arrival at Davenport, England, they proceeded by train to Lower St. Martin's Plains, Shorncliffe, arriving late at night 9 June 1915. The battalion was briefly designated a Reserve Battalion to absorb casualties from the 15th and 16th Battalions of the 1st Division. Winter was spent in huts at East Sandling. It disembarked in France on 22 February 1916, where it fought as part of the 9th Canadian Brigade, 3rd Canadian Division in France and Flanders until the end of the war. The 43rd returned home on the SS Baltic from Liverpool to Halifax, 20 March and after a civic welcome celebration, they were demobilized 24 March 1919. The battalion was disbanded on 30 August 1920.

The 43rd Battalion recruited in and was mobilized at Winnipeg, Manitoba.

The 43rd Battalion had five officers commanding:

- Lt-Col. R. MacD. Thomson, 1 June 1915 – 8 October 1916 (wounded, then killed by shellfire near Courcelette, France, Battle of the Somme)
- Lt.-Col. W. Grassie, DSO, 9 October 1916 – 4 November 1917 (he subsequently returned to Canada and resigned his commission in 1918)
- Lt.-Col. W.K. Chandler, 4 November 1917 – 23 December 1917
- Lt-Col. H.M. Urquart, DSO, MC, 23 December 1917 – 16 August 1918 (wounded during the attack against Fresnoy-les-Roye, France, Battle of Amiens)
- Lt.-Col. W.K. Chandler, DSO, 16 August 1918-Demobilization

One member of the 43rd Battalion was awarded the Victoria Cross. Lieutenant Robert Shankland was presented with the Victoria Cross for his intelligence report and observations at Bellevue Spur, Battle of Passchendaele on 26 October 1917. He had previously been awarded the Distinguished Conduct Medal as a sergeant for leading a stretcher bearer party at Sanctuary Wood in June 1916.

The first chaplain attached to the battalion was Charles William Gordon, who held the rank of captain, then major, senior chaplain to the 9th Canadian Brigade. He was well-known throughout Canada as novelist "Ralph Connor." Gordon returned to Canada after the Battle of the Somme. His replacement was Captain George C.F. Pringle who had spent many years in the Klondike.

One of the original officers was Major Bartholomew Charlton, formerly with the 79th Overseas Draft, who was wounded five times but returned with the battalion in 1919.

== Battle honours ==
The 43rd Battalion was awarded the following battle honours:

- MOUNT SORREL
- SOMME, 1916
- Flers-Courcelette
- Ancre Heights
- ARRAS, 1917, '18
- Vimy, 1917
- HILL 70
- Ypres 1917
- Passchendaele
- AMIENS
- Scarpe 1918
- Drocourt-Quéant
- HINDENBURG LINE
- Canal du Nord
- PURSUIT TO MONS
- FRANCE AND FLANDERS, 1916-18

== Perpetuation ==
The 43rd Battalion (Cameron Highlanders of Canada), CEF, is perpetuated by The Queen's Own Cameron Highlanders of Canada.

== See also ==
- List of infantry battalions in the Canadian Expeditionary Force

== Sources ==
- The Queen's Own Cameron Highlanders of Canada, Twenty-Fifth Anniversary Souvenir, ed. by Lt-Col. J.D. Sinclair, Winnipeg, Manitoba, 1935
- Canadian Expeditionary Force 1914-1919 by Col. G.W.L. Nicholson, CD, Queen's Printer, Ottawa, Ontario, 1962
- Postscript To Adventure, the Autobiography of Ralph Connor by Charles W. Gordon, Hodder and Stoughton, London, 1938; reprinted McClelland and Stewart, Toronto, 1975
- Tillicums of the Trail by George C.F. Pringle, McClelland and Stewart, Toronto, 1922
- Adventures in Service by George C.F. Pringle, McClelland and Stewart, Toronto, 1929
- Trench Tea and Sandbags by David McMillan, Privately Printed, R. McAdam, Chessington, England, 1996
- Carry On, Reflections from a war by Jim Cameron, D. W. Frieson and Sons, 1975
