= Rots, Calvados =

Rots
- Commune
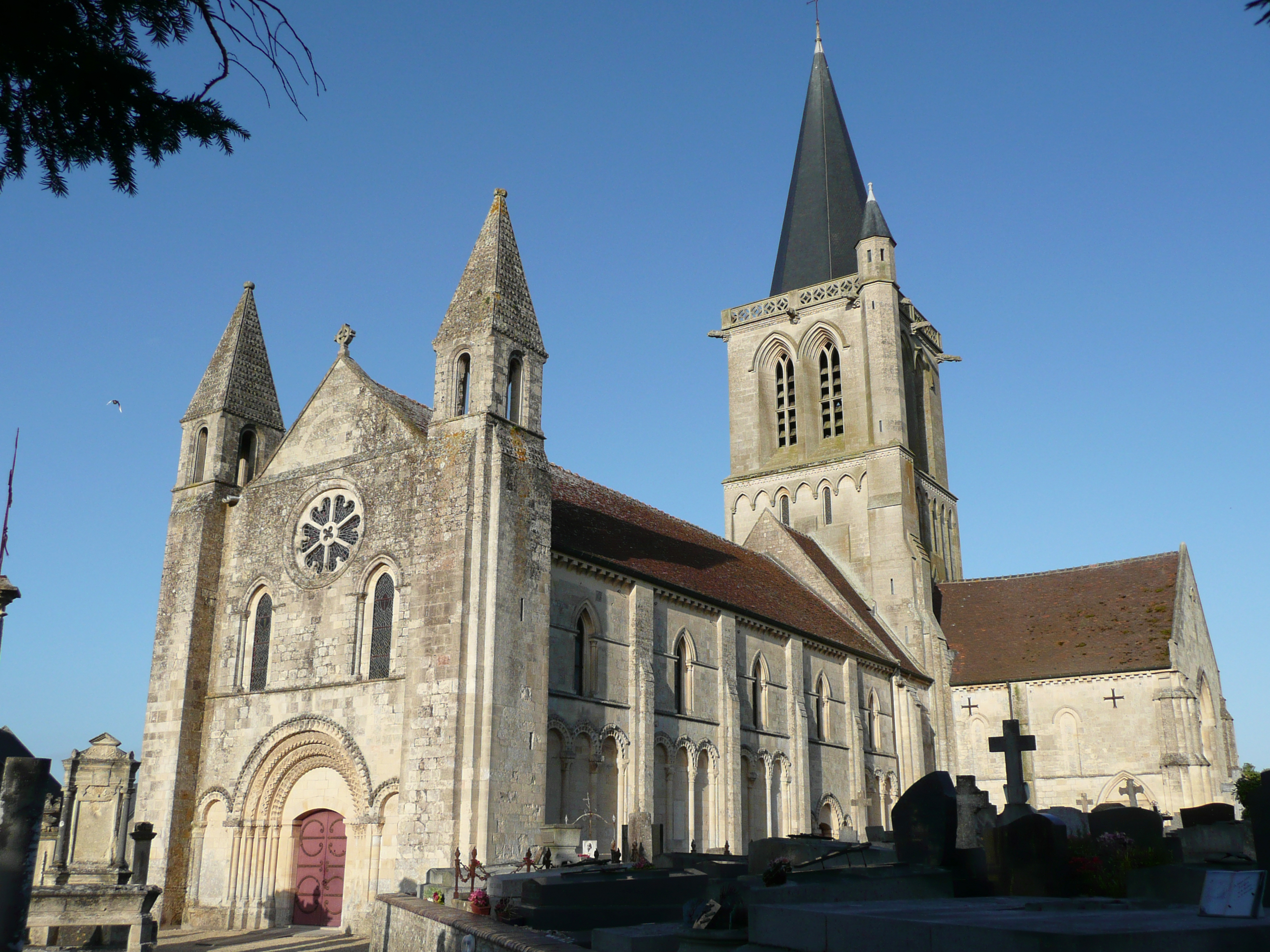
- Saint Ouen

- Coat of arms
- Location of Rots
- Location within France Location within Normandy
- Coordinates: 49°12′30″N 0°28′36″W
- Country: France
- Region: Normandy
- Department: Calvados
- Arrondissement: Caen
- Canton: Thue et Mue
- Intercommunality: CU Caen la Mer

Government
  - Mayor (2020–2026): Michel Bourguignon
- Area^{1}: 23.40 km^{2} (9.03 sq mi)
- Elevation: 60 m (200 ft)
- Highest elevation: 72 m (236 ft)
- Lowest elevation: 41 m (135 ft)
- Population (2023): 2,544
  - Density: 108.7/km^{2} (281.6/sq mi)
- Time zone: UTC+01:00 (CET)
  - Summer (DST): UTC+02:00 (CEST)
- INSEE/Postal code: 14543 /14980
- ^{1} French Land Register data, which excludes lakes, ponds, glaciers > 1 km^{2} (0.386 sq mi or 247 acres) and river estuaries.

Rots (French pronunciation: [ʁo]) is a commune in the Calvados department in the Normandy region in northwestern France. On 1 January 2016, the former communes Lasson and Secqueville-en-Bessin were merged into Rots.

== Geography ==
Rots sits in the Caen Plain and Caen's urban agglomeration.

== Population ==
Population data refer to the commune in its geography as of January 2025.

Historical population
Year	Pop.	±% p.a.
1968	1,372	—
1975	1,537	+1.64%
1982	1,712	+1.55%
1990	1,912	+1.39%
1999	2,206	+1.60%
2007	2,329	+0.68%
2012	2,400	+0.60%
2017	2,438	+0.31%
2023	2,544	+0.71%
Source: INSEE

== See also ==
- Communes of the Calvados department
