= Secqueville-Hoyau =

Secqueville-Hoyau (SA des Anciens Établissements Secqueville-Hoyau)
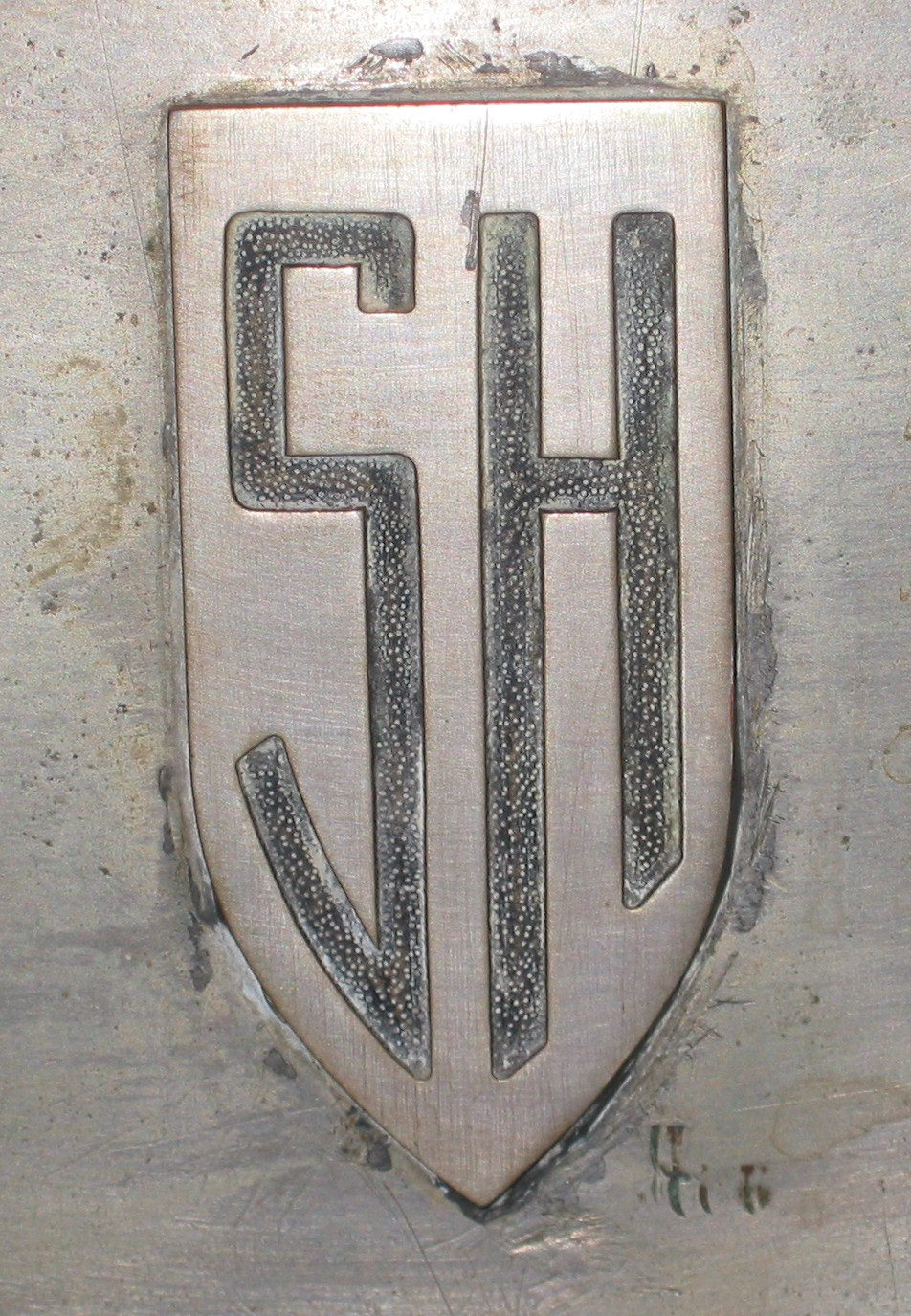

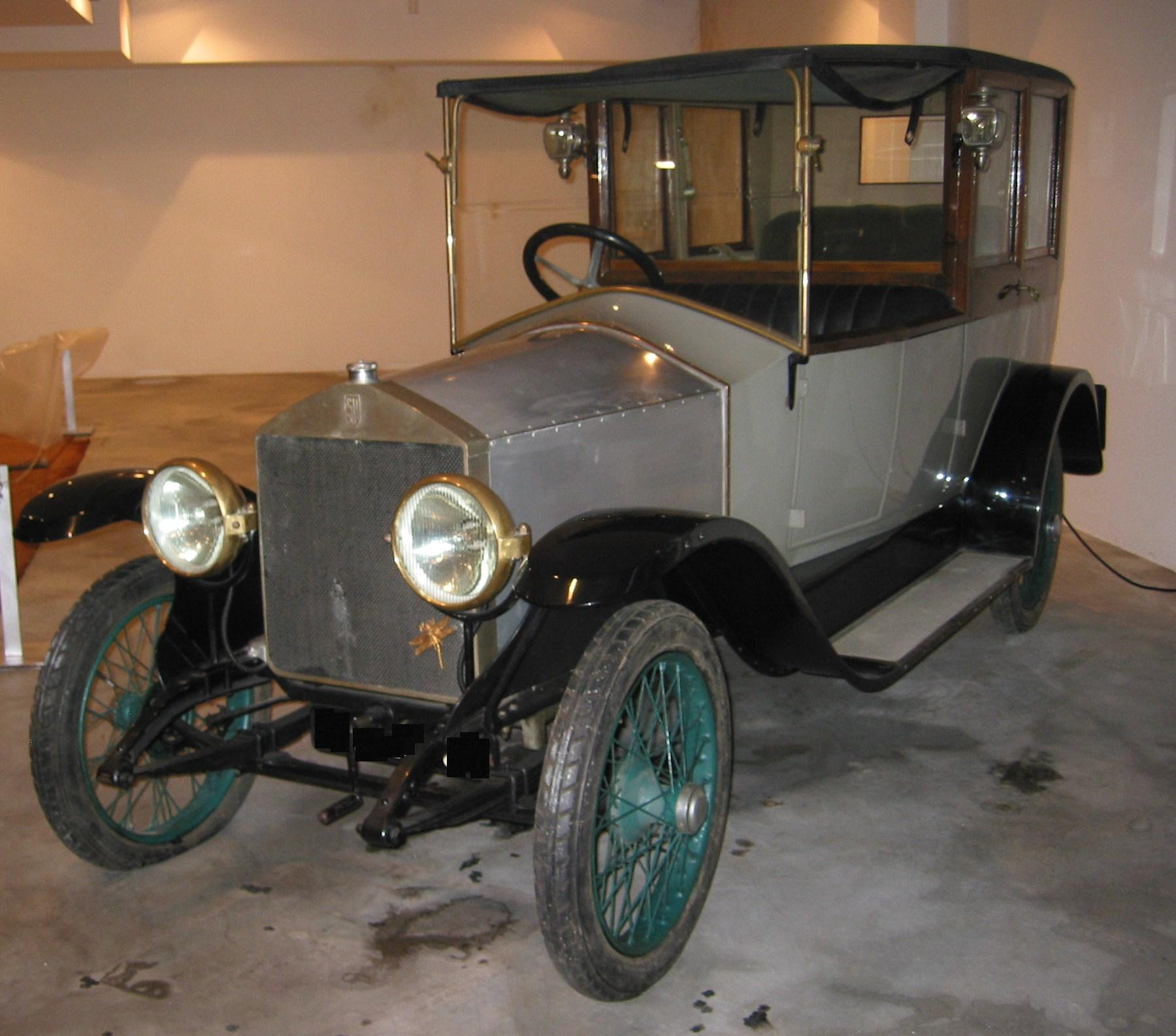
- Industry: Aircraft engines and propellers (1911-1919); Automotive (1919-1924)
- Founded: 1911
- Founder: Alfred Secqueville; Gaston Hoyau
- Defunct: 1924
- Headquarters: Gennevilliers, France

SA des Anciens Établissements Secqueville-Hoyau was a French automobile producer between 1919 and 1924. The factory was established in what was then a small town, a short distance to the north-west of Paris, called Gennevilliers.

== The business ==
Alfred Secqueville and Gaston Hoyau established their business at Gennevilliers in 1911 as a producer of aircraft engines and propellers. The outbreak of the First World War in 1914 drove an accelerated demand for aircraft, and during the war the manufacturer produced Bugatti designed aero-engines under licence, leading to speculation that their subsequent designs may have been influenced by engineers from Bugatti’s Molsheim plant.

With the outbreak of peace the company switched in 1919 to automobile production, quickly abandoning the production of aero-engines in order to concentrate on the new business. The cars were branded as Secqueville-Hoyaus. Although there was only a single model, the tight tolerances and close adherence to prescribed processes that had been needed to produce aircraft engines enabled the company to produce a high quality modern car with a flexible engine, a four speed transmission and ventilated drum brakes.

Production ended in 1923, however, and the last car was sold in 1924. By this time approximately 500 cars had been produced.

== The cars ==
Secqueville-Hoyau attended the 15th Paris Motor Show in October 1924. They took Stand No. 58 where they exhibited their 10HP car, its radiator fashionably reminiscent of that to be found on the front of a Rolls-Royce. The 4-cylinder side-valve engine was of 1,243cc. An unusual feature was the electric starter. Three different wheelbase lengths were offered, and although sources vary as to the precise length offered, they fall between 2,386 mm (93.9 in) and 2,893 mm (113.9 in).

The manufacturer’s prices at the 1919 motor show were between 11,800 francs and 12,500 francs, according to length, for cars in bare chassis form. A conventional range of bodies, including a three or four ”Torpedo” bodied car and a three or four-seater “conduite interieure” (closed sedan/saloon/berline) was offered. The top price listed at the show was 21,400 francs for the long “conduite interieure” bodied car.
