= Secqueville-en-Bessin =

- Part of Rots
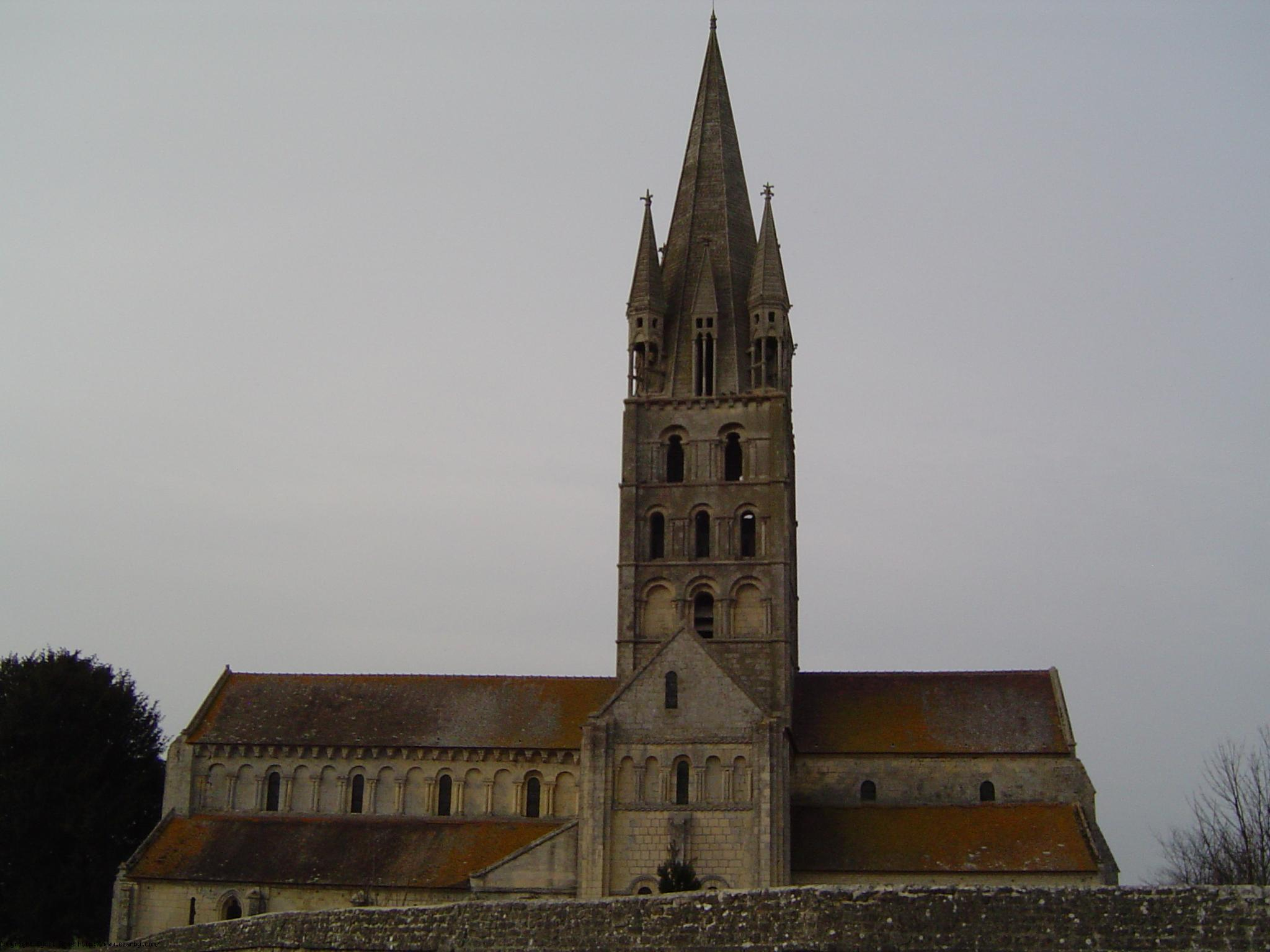
- Location of Secqueville-en-Bessin
- Location within France Location within Normandy
- Coordinates: 49°14′05″N 0°31′01″W
- Country: France
- Region: Normandy
- Department: Calvados
- Arrondissement: Caen
- Canton: Thue et Mue
- Commune: Rots
- Area^{1}: 7.16 km^{2} (2.76 sq mi)
- Elevation: 40 m (130 ft)
- Highest elevation: 65 m (213 ft)
- Lowest elevation: 27 m (89 ft)
- Population (2023): 450
  - Density: 63/km^{2} (160/sq mi)
- Time zone: UTC+01:00 (CET)
  - Summer (DST): UTC+02:00 (CEST)
- Postal code: 14740
- ^{1} French Land Register data, which excludes lakes, ponds, glaciers > 1 km^{2} (0.386 sq mi or 247 acres) and river estuaries.

Secqueville-en-Bessin (French pronunciation: [sɛkvil ɑ̃ bɛsɛ̃], literally Secqueville in Bessin) is a former commune in the Calvados department in the Normandy region in northwestern France. On 1 January 2016, it was merged into the commune of Rots.

== International relations ==
Secqueville-en-Bessin is twinned with:

- Farringdon, United Kingdom

== See also ==
- Communes of the Calvados department
